= It's Only a Paper Moon (Star Trek: Deep Space Nine) =

- Star Trek: Deep Space Nine episode
- Episode no.: Season 7 Episode 10
- Directed by: Anson Williams
- Story by: David Mack; John J. Ordover
- Teleplay by: Ronald D. Moore
- Production code: 560
- Original air date: December 28, 1998

Guest appearances
- James Darren as Vic Fontaine; Aron Eisenberg as Nog; Max Grodénchik as Rom; Chase Masterson as Leeta

Episode chronology
← Previous "Covenant"	Next → "Prodigal Daughter"
- Star Trek: Deep Space Nine season 7

"It's Only a Paper Moon" is the 160th episode of the television series Star Trek: Deep Space Nine and the tenth episode of the seventh season. Directed by Anson Williams, the episode was written by Ronald D. Moore and based on a pitch by David Mack and John J. Ordover, who had previously written "Starship Down" from season 4.

Set in the 24th century, the series follows the adventures of the crew of the space station Deep Space Nine; the later seasons of the series follow a war between the United Federation of Planets and an empire known as the Dominion. This episode centers on a holosuite, a fictional technology that uses holograms to create immersive simulated environments. In this episode, the young Ensign Nog, suffering from post-traumatic stress disorder and phantom pain following the loss of his leg in the earlier episode "The Siege of AR-558", copes by retreating from the world to live in a holosuite simulation of 1960s Las Vegas.

== Plot ==
After having his leg replaced after a battle injury during the Siege of AR-558, and following weeks of rehabilitation, Nog returns to Deep Space Nine. He suffers flashbacks of his injury and feels pain in his new leg. He secludes himself in his quarters, sleeping most of the day and repeatedly listening to a recording by holographic lounge singer Vic Fontaine of "I'll Be Seeing You"—the song that was played to keep up crew morale at AR-558.

When his roommate Jake becomes fed up with the constant repetition, Nog seeks out Vic in a holosuite. After hearing Vic perform the song in every arrangement he knows, Nog convinces Vic to allow him to stay in his (simulated) hotel suite for the night. Nog decides to stay long-term in the simulation of 1962 Las Vegas, and although Nog's family is skeptical, counselor Ezri Dax consents to the idea to see where it leads.

Vic and Nog bond quickly, but at the expense of Nog's relations with his friends and family; he gets in a fight with Jake, and a meeting with his father Rom and stepmother Leeta is short and awkward. Having his program running all day means that Vic, for the first time, is living a full life—sleeping, eating, socializing with friends, and running his business. Nog helps Vic with his finances, and even recommends Vic expand his business. The two plan to build a new casino, and as Nog becomes more confident, he relies less and less on his cane.

Dax, impressed by Vic's results, reminds him that Nog needs to leave soon; Vic had been enjoying himself so much that he had forgotten Nog was there for rehabilitation. Vic urges Nog to leave, and when he refuses, Vic shuts off his own program, forcing Nog back into the real world. Nog attempts to restart the holosuite, but operations chief Miles O'Brien tells Nog that Vic can prevent his own program from starting, and reminds Nog that everyone misses him. Vic appears, and Nog finally admits the emotional trauma his injury caused and his fear of death; Vic counters that if he stays in the holosuite, he'll still die, "not all at once, but little by little". Nog returns to limited duty but arranges for Vic's program to be left running all the time, to return the favor and give Vic a chance at a "real" life.

== Production ==
The episode was initially written by David Mack and John J. Ordover; they initially pitched the episode as "Everybody Comes to Quark's" and sold it alongside what would later become the season 4 episode "Starship Down". The original episode was set entirely in Quark's bar, following three separate storylines. The plot "sort of bounced around the writers room for a couple of years", before it was set to following Nog's loss of his leg and relocated to Quark's Vic Fontaine holosuite program. Mack and Ordover were hired to rewrite the story to account for these changes, and Ronald D. Moore further rewrote. Moore removed the second and third storylines as he felt they interfered with the dramatic impact of Nog's PTSD. Keith DeCandido, a close friend of both Mack and Ordover, noted in his rewatch of this episode in 2016 that he was slightly disappointed that so little remained of the original pitch, writing that "there are some gems in the original that the world has seriously missed out on".

Vic and Nog preferring The Searchers over Shane is a minor in-joke, since The Searchers featured Jeffrey Hunter, who played Captain Christopher Pike in the Star Trek: The Original Series first pilot episode, "The Cage".

Vic performs four songs in this episode: "I'll Be Seeing You" (which also appeared in "The Siege of AR-558"), "Just in Time", "I've Got the World on a String", and "It's Only a Paper Moon".

== Reception ==
Aron Eisenberg, who played Nog, described this episode as his personal favorite. He mentioned in several interviews that after the episode aired, wounded combat veterans and veteran service organizations contacted and praised him for his realistic portrayal of the psychological trauma of being severely wounded in battle and the resulting loss of a limb, a trauma which often lasts far longer than the physical injury itself.

In 2012, Den of Geek ranked this the third best episode of Star Trek: Deep Space Nine.

Keith DeCandido, writing for Tor.com, believed it to be a superb episode, writing that it's "a testament to the strength of DS9's ensemble that it can give over an entire story to two characters who aren't even opening-credits regulars and make it one of the show's most compelling hours". He gave the episode a rating of 9 out of 10, removing a point due to Ezri Dax's incompetence as a counselor, and because of how much of the original "Everybody Comes to Quark's" pitch was removed (see § Production above). The A.V. Club's Zack Handlen conversely disliked the unexplored implications of Vic's consciousness, especially as the episode featured him significantly more than previous episodes. He also somewhat disliked Nog's post-traumatic stress disorder being solved in the space of one episode. Handlen noted how Nog's PTSD "has some real edges to it, and [how] some aspects of it should be familiar to anyone who's suffered a period of severe depression". He lauded Aron Eisenberg's acting and referred to Ezri's counseling as "not terrible". While he wished that the writers had not "taken the easy way out in the end with the magical all-knowing computer program", he found the ending (in which Nog arranges to keep Vic's program running all day) "sweet".

A 2015 binge-watching guide for Star Trek: Deep Space Nine by Wired listed "It's Only a Paper Moon" among a handful of "episodes you can't skip", calling it "[the show's] most clear commentary on post-traumatic stress".

In 2016, SyFy ranked this the 4th best holodeck episode of the Star Trek franchise.

In 2016, The Hollywood Reporter ranked this episode as the 14th best of Star Trek: Deep Space Nine. They note that it follows up on some of the events of "The Siege of AR-558", which they had ranked as 15th best of the series. They rated the episode the 56th best episode of all Star Trek episodes to date. In 2019, CBR ranked this the 8th best holodeck-themed episode of all Star Trek franchise episodes up to that time.

In 2019, Comicbook.com ranked "It's Only a Paper Moon" the sixth best episode of Star Trek: Deep Space Nine.

Upon the death of actor Aron Eisenberg in 2019, Screen Rant ranked "It's Only a Paper Moon" as the best episode featuring his character Nog. Reviewer Stephanie Marceau wrote, "Watching Nog deal with his conflicted feelings and trauma about the war and Starfleet was powerful and inspiring" and found the narrative "respectful" of the character's loss.
