= List of Star Trek: Deep Space Nine episodes =

Star Trek: Deep Space Nine is the third live-action television series in the Star Trek franchise and aired in syndication from January 1993 through June 1999. There were a total of 173 (original broadcast & DVD) or 176 (later syndication) episodes over the show's seven seasons, which are listed here in chronological order by original airdate, which match the episode order in each season's DVD set.

The first episode, "Emissary"; the fourth season premiere, "The Way of the Warrior"; and the series finale, "What You Leave Behind", originally aired as two-hour presentations, but were subsequently aired as sets of two one-hour episodes in reruns.

== Series overview ==
Season	Episodes	Originally released	
Season	Episodes	First released	Last released
1	20	January 3, 1993	June 19, 1993
2	26	September 25, 1993	June 11, 1994
3	26	September 24, 1994	June 17, 1995
4	26	September 30, 1995	June 15, 1996
5	26	September 28, 1996	June 16, 1997
6	26	September 27, 1997	June 13, 1998
7	26	September 30, 1998	June 2, 1999

== Episodes ==
=== Season 1 (1993) ===
No. overall	No. in season	Title	Directed by	Written by	Original release date	Prod. code	Viewers (millions)
1	1	"Emissary"	David Carson	Story by : Rick Berman & Michael Piller; Teleplay by : Michael Piller	January 3, 1993	40510-721 (401-402)	18.8
2	2	"Emissary"	David Carson	Story by : Rick Berman & Michael Piller; Teleplay by : Michael Piller	January 3, 1993	40510-721 (401-402)	18.8
A new joint Federation/Bajoran crew is assigned to a former Cardassian space station: Deep Space Nine. Benjamin Sisko, the new station commander, is declared the Emissary of the Prophets by a Bajoran priest, and discovers a stable wormhole connecting Bajor to the Gamma Quadrant on the other side of the galaxy.: Originally shown as a two-hour pilot movie, but converted to two separate episodes in later syndication.
3	3	"Past Prologue"	Winrich Kolbe	Katharyn Powers	January 10, 1993	40510-404	13.4
A Bajoran terrorist with ties to Kira arrives on Deep Space Nine and is pursued by the Cardassians. Garak, a mysterious Cardassian tailor who lives on the station, assists in uncovering what he is up to.
4	4	"A Man Alone"	Paul Lynch	Story by : Gerald Sanford and Michael Piller; Teleplay by : Michael Piller	January 17, 1993	40510-403	13.0
Odo is accused of the murder of a Bajoran smuggler.
5	5	"Babel"	Paul Lynch	Story by : Sally Caves and Ira Steven Behr; Teleplay by : Michael McGreevey and Naren Shankar	January 24, 1993	40510-405	11.6
A mysterious virus plagues the station, causing first aphasia and eventually death.
6	6	"Captive Pursuit"	Corey Allen	Story by : Jill Sherman Donner; Teleplay by : Jill Sherman Donner and Michael Piller	January 31, 1993	40510-406	12.9
O'Brien befriends an alien from the Gamma Quadrant who is being hunted.
7	7	"Q-Less"	Paul Lynch	Story by : Hannah Louise Shearer; Teleplay by : Robert Hewitt Wolfe	February 7, 1993	40510-407	12.8
Q and Vash arrive on Deep Space Nine. However, Vash has grown annoyed by Q's attention and wants him to leave her alone.
8	8	"Dax"	David Carson	Story by : Peter Allan Fields; Teleplay by : D. C. Fontana and Peter Allan Fields	February 14, 1993	40510-408	12.1
Jadzia Dax is arrested for a murder allegedly committed by Curzon Dax, a previous host of her symbiont. An extradition hearing is held to determine whether Jadzia can be held liable for Curzon's actions.
9	9	"The Passenger"	Paul Lynch	Story by : Morgan Gendel; Teleplay by : Morgan Gendel and Robert Hewitt Wolfe & Michael Piller	February 21, 1993	40510-409	11.6
A sinister criminal cheats death to hide his consciousness in the mind of someone on Deep Space Nine.
10	10	"Move Along Home"	David Carson	Story by : Michael Piller; Teleplay by : Frederick Rappaport and Lisa Rich & Jeanne Carrigan-Fauci	March 14, 1993	40510-410	11.4
Quark plays a board game with the Wadi, a newly encountered species from the Gamma Quadrant, and the lives of the crew seemingly depend on the outcome.
11	11	"The Nagus"	David Livingston	Story by : David Livingston; Teleplay by : Ira Steven Behr	March 21, 1993	40510-411	10.7
Quark is named as the head of the Ferengi Alliance by Grand Nagus Zek, but he is now surrounded by enemies.
12	12	"Vortex"	Winrich Kolbe	Sam Rolfe	April 18, 1993	40510-412	9.7
Odo discovers he might not be the only one of his kind when a visitor from the Gamma Quadrant claims he can contact Odo's people.
13	13	"Battle Lines"	Paul Lynch	Story by : Hilary J. Bader; Teleplay by : Richard Danus and Evan Carlos Somers	April 25, 1993	40510-413	9.9
The spiritual leader of Bajor, Kai Opaka, travels with Sisko, Bashir and Kira on a trip to the Gamma Quadrant, but is stranded on a world where the dead are resurrected.
14	14	"The Storyteller"	David Livingston	Story by : Kurt Michael Bensmiller; Teleplay by : Kurt Michael Bensmiller and Ira Steven Behr	May 2, 1993	40510-414	9.3
O'Brien is recruited to save a Bajoran village from destruction by a mysterious cloud creature.
15	15	"Progress"	Les Landau	Peter Allan Fields	May 9, 1993	40510-415	9.2
Kira has to deal with a stubborn farmer (Brian Keith) who refuses to leave his home even though it is slated for demolition.
16	16	"If Wishes Were Horses"	Robert Legato	Story by : Nell McCue Crawford & William L. Crawford; Teleplay by : Nell McCue Crawford & William L. Crawford and Michael Piller	May 16, 1993	40510-416	9.0
Deep Space Nine is put in jeopardy when the crew's thoughts manifest themselves, and such figures as Rumpelstiltskin appear.
17	17	"The Forsaken"	Les Landau	Story by : Jim Trombetta; Teleplay by : Don Carlos Dunaway and Michael Piller	May 23, 1993	40510-417	9.7
The Federation ambassador from Betazed, Lwaxana Troi, visits the station, and develops an affection for Odo. Meanwhile, data from a mysterious Gamma Quadrant probe causes system failures on DS9.
18	18	"Dramatis Personae"	Cliff Bole	Joe Menosky	May 30, 1993	40510-418	9.0
Tensions rise between the DS9 crew members after they are telepathically imprinted with the memories of participants in an alien power struggle.
19	19	"Duet"	James L. Conway	Story by : Lisa Rich & Jeanne Carrigan-Fauci; Teleplay by : Peter Allan Fields	June 13, 1993	40510-419	8.9
A visiting Cardassian, Marritza, may in fact be the notorious war criminal Gul Darhe'el, butcher of Gallitep labor camp, and Kira is determined to bring him down.
20	20	"In the Hands of the Prophets"	David Livingston	Robert Hewitt Wolfe	June 20, 1993	40510-420	8.8
A conniving Bajoran cleric, Vedek Winn, protests Keiko O'Brien's school on Deep Space Nine when she discovers Keiko is teaching her students that the inhabitants of the wormhole are aliens, not gods.

=== Season 2 (1993–94) ===
No. overall	No. in season	Title	Directed by	Written by	Original release date	Prod. code	Viewers (millions)
21	1	"The Homecoming"	Winrich Kolbe	Story by : Jeri Taylor and Ira Steven Behr; Teleplay by : Ira Steven Behr	September 26, 1993	40510-421	9.7
Quark gives Kira a Bajoran earring he claims was sent as a message from a Cardassian mining planet. (Part 1 of 3)
22	2	"The Circle"	Corey Allen	Peter Allan Fields	October 3, 1993	40510-422	9.0
The Circle attempts to topple the Bajoran government, but there is more to the situation than meets the eye. (Part 2 of 3)
23	3	"The Siege"	Winrich Kolbe	Michael Piller	October 10, 1993	40510-423	9.0
Sisko and Li Nalas help stop Deep Space Nine from being commandeered by The Circle, while Kira and Dax try to put an end to the Circle by presenting evidence that Minister Jaro is being backed by the Cardassians. (Part 3 of 3)
24	4	"Invasive Procedures"	Les Landau	Story by : John Whelpley; Teleplay by : John Whelpley and Robert Hewitt Wolfe	October 17, 1993	40510-424	9.3
A plasma storm leads to the evacuation of most of the station, but a Trill refugee has his own plans.
25	5	"Cardassians"	Cliff Bole	Story by : Gene Wolande & John Wright; Teleplay by : James Crocker	October 24, 1993	40510-425	9.1
Garak investigates the identity of a Cardassian boy, Rugal, abandoned on Bajor, who has been raised by a Bajoran.
26	6	"Melora"	Winrich Kolbe	Story by : Evan Carlos Somers; Teleplay by : Evan Carlos Somers, Steven Baum, Michael Piller and James Crocker	October 31, 1993	40510-426	9.7
Bashir tries to help Ensign Melora Pazlar, the first Elaysian to join Starfleet, adjust to "normal" gravity.
27	7	"Rules of Acquisition"	David Livingston	Story by : Hilary J. Bader; Teleplay by : Ira Steven Behr	November 7, 1993	40510-427	8.8
Quark represents Grand Nagus Zek in a plot to establish a Ferengi business presence in the Gamma Quadrant. Pel, a young Ferengi, teams up with Quark and they learn that to do business in the Gamma Quadrant they must contact the Keremma, a member race of the Dominion.
28	8	"Necessary Evil"	James L. Conway	Peter Allan Fields	November 14, 1993	40510-428	9.2
When Quark is shot, Odo re-opens a five-year-old murder case of a Bajoran, Mr. Vaatrik, who was a Cardassian collaborator.
29	9	"Second Sight"	Alexander Singer	Story by : Mark Gehred-O'Connell; Teleplay by : Mark Gehred-O'Connell, Ira Steven Behr and Robert Hewitt Wolfe	November 21, 1993	40510-429	9.4
A mysterious woman, Fenna, catches Sisko's eye during their fleeting meetings. Meanwhile, an extremely egotistical scientist is working on a project to re-ignite a dead star.
30	10	"Sanctuary"	Les Landau	Story by : Gabe Essoe & Kelley Miles; Teleplay by : Frederick Rappaport	November 28, 1993	40510-430	8.9
The Skrreea, displaced humanoid farmers from the Gamma Quadrant, claim Bajor as Kentanna, their legendary homeland.
31	11	"Rivals"	David Livingston	Story by : Jim Trombetta & Michael Piller; Teleplay by : Joe Menosky	January 2, 1994	40510-431	9.3
Quark feels threatened when a charming swindler, Martus Mazur, opens a competing bar, known as Club Martus.
32	12	"The Alternate"	David Carson	Story by : Jim Trombetta and Bill Dial; Teleplay by : Bill Dial	January 9, 1994	40510-432	8.9
A scientist, Dr. Mora Pol of the Bajoran Science Institute, finds a life-form in the Gamma Quadrant that may be related to Odo.
33	13	"Armageddon Game"	Winrich Kolbe	Morgan Gendel	January 30, 1994	40510-433	8.6
O'Brien and Bashir help two warring races, the Kellerun and T'lani, erase all knowledge of a deadly biological weapon, but are not trusted to keep what they have learned a secret.
34	14	"Whispers"	Les Landau	Paul Robert Coyle	February 6, 1994	40510-434	9.3
While preparing the station for upcoming peace talks, O'Brien discovers that the crew have been hiding information from him and giving orders behind his back. O'Brien begins to suspect everyone on the station is gradually being altered or replaced by an unknown force.
35	15	"Paradise"	Corey Allen	Story by : Jim Trombetta and James Crocker; Teleplay by : Jeff King, Richard Manning and Hans Beimler	February 13, 1994	40510-435	8.2
Commander Sisko and Chief O'Brien are stranded on a planet, Aurelius, where their leader, Alixus, rejects technology, even when it means the death of others.
36	16	"Shadowplay"	Robert Scheerer	Robert Hewitt Wolfe	February 20, 1994	40510-436	9.5
Odo and Dax investigate why a village's residents are disappearing.
37	17	"Playing God"	David Livingston	Story by : Jim Trombetta; Teleplay by : Jim Trombetta and Michael Piller	February 27, 1994	40510-437	8.8
Dax is supervising Arjin, a Trill candidate for joining, and she helps him find his voice and discover what he wants from life and from joining. Meanwhile, a proto-universe threatens to destroy the station and Bajor.
38	18	"Profit and Loss"	Robert Wiemer	Flip Kobler and Cindy Marcus	March 20, 1994	40510-438	8.8
Quark is reunited with his former Cardassian lover, Natima Lang, but she is engaged in dangerous political intrigue with her students Rekela and Hogue: they want to reduce the political power of the Cardassian military.
39	19	"Blood Oath"	Winrich Kolbe	Peter Allan Fields	March 27, 1994	40510-439	8.4
Jadzia Dax honors an oath made by Curzon Dax to three Klingons (Kor, Koloth, and Kang), and goes with them on a crusade against their sworn enemy "the Albino" who murdered their firstborn children as revenge for stopping his raid on a Klingon colony.
40	20	"The Maquis, Part I"	David Livingston	Story by : Rick Berman, Michael Piller, Jeri Taylor and James Crocker; Teleplay by : James Crocker	April 24, 1994	40510-440	8.6
Federation colonists reject a treaty with Cardassia and take matters into their own hands, forming a terrorist group called 'The Maquis'.
41	21	"The Maquis, Part II"	Corey Allen	Story by : Rick Berman, Michael Piller, Jeri Taylor and Ira Steven Behr; Teleplay by : Ira Steven Behr	May 1, 1994	40510-441	8.3
Federation colonists reject a treaty with Cardassia and take matters into their own hands by planning to destroy a weapons depot at the Cardassian Bryma colony.
42	22	"The Wire"	Kim Friedman	Robert Hewitt Wolfe	May 8, 1994	40510-442	8.0
In order to save Garak's life, Bashir must unravel some of the secrets in the Cardassian's past.
43	23	"Crossover"	David Livingston	Story by : Peter Allan Fields; Teleplay by : Peter Allan Fields and Michael Piller	May 15, 1994	40510-443	8.9
Kira and Bashir accidentally cross into the Mirror Universe, where a Klingon-Cardassian alliance rules and Terrans are slaves on the station. A century before, James T. Kirk had made a similar crossover, affecting human and galactic history.
44	24	"The Collaborator"	Cliff Bole	Story by : Gary Holland; Teleplay by : Gary Holland, Ira Steven Behr and Robert Hewitt Wolfe	May 22, 1994	40510-444	6.6
A Bajoran secretary named Kubus, who aided the Cardassian occupation forces, wants to return home from exile. Vedek Winn engages in a power play against Vedek Bareil to become Kai.
45	25	"Tribunal"	Avery Brooks	Bill Dial	June 5, 1994	40510-445	7.7
O'Brien is declared guilty of an unspecified crime and later "tried" at a tribunal held on Cardassia Prime.
46	26	"The Jem'Hadar"	Kim Friedman	Ira Steven Behr	June 12, 1994	40510-446	7.7
Sisko, Jake, Nog, and Quark go camping on a Gamma Quadrant world. Sisko and Quark are captured by mysterious soldiers called the Jem'Hadar and meet a force, the Dominion, who rival the Federation.

=== Season 3 (1994–95) ===
No. overall	No. in season	Title	Directed by	Written by	Original release date	Prod. code	Viewers (millions)
47	1	"The Search, Part I"	Kim Friedman	Story by : Ira Steven Behr and Robert Hewitt Wolfe; Teleplay by : Ronald D. Moore	September 24, 1994	40510-447	9.3
Sisko takes the new USS Defiant into the Gamma Quadrant to find the mysterious leaders of the Dominion and avert a war, while Odo is drawn by instinct towards his home planet in the Omarion Nebula.
48	2	"The Search, Part II"	Jonathan Frakes	Story by : Ira Steven Behr and Robert Hewitt Wolfe; Teleplay by : Ira Steven Behr	October 1, 1994	40510-448	8.2
Odo begins to connect with his fellow Changelings as Sisko attempts to negotiate peace with the Dominion.
49	3	"The House of Quark"	Les Landau	Story by : Tom Benko; Teleplay by : Ronald D. Moore	October 8, 1994	40510-449	7.6
Quark brags falsely about killing a Klingon, Kozak, and is then forced to marry the widow, Grilka, founding his own 'House of Quark'.
50	4	"Equilibrium"	Cliff Bole	Story by : Christopher Teague; Teleplay by : René Echevarria	October 15, 1994	40510-450	7.4
A secret from Dax's past could mean the end of the current host's life.
51	5	"Second Skin"	Les Landau	Robert Hewitt Wolfe	October 22, 1994	40510-451	7.8
Kira is kidnapped by Cardassians, surgically altered to look Cardassian and told she is actually an undercover Cardassian agent.
52	6	"The Abandoned"	Avery Brooks	D. Thomas Maio and Steve Warnek	October 29, 1994	40510-452	8.0
Quark purchases a salvaged ship from the Gamma Quadrant and discovers an infant on board. Sisko invites Mardah, the dabo woman Jake is interested in, to dinner. Odo officially gets quarters aboard DS9.
53	7	"Civil Defense"	Reza Badiyi	Mike Krohn	November 5, 1994	40510-453	8.1
Deep Space Nine is progressively locked down after O'Brien, Jake and Sisko accidentally activate an automated Cardassian security program. The program's counter-insurgency measures keep escalating until it initiates an auto-destruct. Gul Dukat beams on board, but is unable to stop the self-destruct sequence.
54	8	"Meridian"	Jonathan Frakes	Story by : Hilary J. Bader and Evan Carlos Somers; Teleplay by : Mark Gehred-O'Connell	November 12, 1994	40510-454	8.5
Dax falls in love with Deral, who will soon disappear because he is a member of Meridian, a planet that phases between dimensions every 60 years.
55	9	"Defiant"	Cliff Bole	Ronald D. Moore	November 19, 1994	40510-455	9.3
Commander William Riker shows up unannounced and Kira shows him the Defiant, where his real identity and his true motives for coming to Deep Space Nine are revealed.
56	10	"Fascination"	Avery Brooks	Story by : Ira Steven Behr and James Crocker; Teleplay by : Philip LaZebnik	November 26, 1994	40510-456	8.2
Lwaxana Troi pursues Odo during the Bajoran Gratitude Festival as members of the crew suddenly become infatuated with one another.
57	11	"Past Tense: Part I"	Reza Badiyi	Story by : Ira Steven Behr & Robert Hewitt Wolfe; Teleplay by : Robert Hewitt Wolfe	December 31, 1994	40510-457	7.4
A transporter accident sends Sisko, Bashir, and Dax three centuries into Earth's dark past to a time just before the 2024 Bell riots, a violent civil disturbance in opposition to Sanctuaries which are controlled ghettos for the dispossessed.
58	12	"Past Tense: Part II"	Jonathan Frakes	Story by : Ira Steven Behr & Robert Hewitt Wolfe; Teleplay by : Ira Steven Behr & René Echevarria	January 7, 1995	40510-458	8.0
Sisko assumes the role of a pivotal historical figure, Gabriel Bell, in order to restore the timeline.
59	13	"Life Support"	Reza Badiyi	Story by : Christian Ford & Roger Soffer; Teleplay by : Ronald D. Moore	January 28, 1995	40510-459	8.2
Bashir's ethics are put to the test as he keeps Vedek Bareil alive long enough to help Kai Winn complete negotiations for a peace treaty with Cardassia.
60	14	"Heart of Stone"	Alexander Singer	Ira Steven Behr & Robert Hewitt Wolfe	February 4, 1995	40510-460	8.3
When Kira's life is put in jeopardy, Odo expresses the depth of his feelings for her. Meanwhile, back on the station, Nog requests a letter of recommendation to Starfleet.
61	15	"Destiny"	Les Landau	David S. Cohen & Martin A. Winer	February 11, 1995	40510-461	8.1
Despite Trakor's Bajoran prophecy of destruction, Sisko assists in a joint scientific venture with the Cardassians to open communications through the Bajoran wormhole. Sisko is forced to face his status as Emissary seriously in the face of the prophecy.
62	16	"Prophet Motive"	René Auberjonois	Ira Steven Behr & Robert Hewitt Wolfe	February 18, 1995	40510-462	7.5
Quark discovers that Grand Nagus Zek has written a new virtuous and benevolent set of the Rules of Acquisition, which would put an end to traditional Ferengi ways. Bashir is oddly disturbed when he is nominated for a highly prestigious medical award.
63	17	"Visionary"	Reza Badiyi	Story by : Ethan H. Calk; Teleplay by : John Shirley	February 25, 1995	40510-463	7.9
Exposure to radiation causes O'Brien to jump five hours into the future for brief periods, including one that shows Deep Space Nine's destruction, while the station hosts Romulan and Klingon delegations.
64	18	"Distant Voices"	Alexander Singer	Story by : Joe Menosky; Teleplay by : Ira Steven Behr & Robert Hewitt Wolfe	April 8, 1995	40510-464	7.1
Approaching his 30th birthday, Julian Bashir is subjected to a telepathic attack by an alien seeking a restricted substance. He wakes up to find the station almost deserted and that he is aging rapidly.
65	19	"Through the Looking Glass"	Winrich Kolbe	Ira Steven Behr & Robert Hewitt Wolfe	April 15, 1995	40510-466	6.9
Sisko is convinced by "Smiley" O'Brien from the Mirror Universe to assume the role of the dead Captain Sisko.
66	20	"Improbable Cause"	Avery Brooks	Story by : Robert Lederman & David R. Long; Teleplay by : René Echevarria	April 22, 1995	40510-465	6.9
Garak's tailor shop is bombed, forcing Odo to investigate who is trying to kill the Cardassian exile – and why. (Part 1 of 2)
67	21	"The Die Is Cast"	David Livingston	Ronald D. Moore	April 29, 1995	40510-467	7.0
Garak reluctantly tortures Odo for information to prove his loyalty to his former mentor, Enabran Tain, as a joint Tal Shiar/Obsidian Order attack on the Founders in the Omarian Nebula is underway. (Part 2 of 2)
68	22	"Explorers"	Cliff Bole	Story by : Hilary J. Bader; Teleplay by : René Echevarria	May 6, 1995	40510-468	6.7
Sisko builds a replica of an ancient Bajoran space vessel and with Jake attempts to prove that the Bajorans developed interstellar travel before Cardassians. Bashir frets over the impending visit of the classmate who graduated first in his class at Starfleet Medical Academy.
69	23	"Family Business"	René Auberjonois	Ira Steven Behr & Robert Hewitt Wolfe	May 13, 1995	40510-469	6.9
Quark returns to his home planet to confront his mother (Moogie) after hearing from the Ferengi Commerce Authority that she broke the law by earning profit. Sisko meets Captain Kasidy Yates as a romantic interest, which Sisko has discovered his son has told most of the station about.
70	24	"Shakaar"	Jonathan West	Gordon Dawson	May 20, 1995	40510-470	7.1
Kai Winn needs Kira to convince the former resistance leader Shakaar, now a farmer on Bajor, to return soil reclamators needed elsewhere in Rakantha, which used to be Bajor's most productive agricultural region.
71	25	"Facets"	Cliff Bole	René Echevarria	June 10, 1995	40510-471	5.9
Jadzia Dax deals with feelings of inferiority as she encounters past hosts in a Trill Zhian'tara ceremony, which is able to transfer the memories of former hosts into another recipient, and Odo takes on the role of Curzon Dax during the experience.
72	26	"The Adversary"	Alexander Singer	Ira Steven Behr & Robert Hewitt Wolfe	June 17, 1995	40510-472	7.1
Ambassador Krajensky informs newly promoted Captain Sisko that there has been a coup on Tzenketh. He orders Sisko to take the Defiant to the nearby Federation colonies to ”show the flag” and keep the Tzenkethi quiet. Meanwhile, a Changeling hides on board the Defiant and sabotages the ship.

=== Season 4 (1995–96) ===
No. overall	No. in season	Title	Stardate	Directed by	Written by	Original release date	Prod. code	Viewers (millions)
73	1	"The Way of the Warrior"	49011.4	James L. Conway	Ira Steven Behr & Robert Hewitt Wolfe	September 30, 1995	40510-718 (40510-473, 40510-474)	8.5
74	2	"The Way of the Warrior"	49011.4	James L. Conway	Ira Steven Behr & Robert Hewitt Wolfe	September 30, 1995	40510-718 (40510-473, 40510-474)	8.5
A Klingon fleet arrives on its way to expand the Klingon Empire at the expense of the Cardassians in the face of the Dominion threat, and Worf is brought to DS9 to negotiate.: Originally shown as a single two-hour episode, but converted to two separate episodes in later syndication.
75	3	"The Visitor"	49037.7	David Livingston	Michael Taylor	October 7, 1995	40510-476	6.9
An elderly Jake Sisko relates the story of how he lost his father to a temporal displacement accident.
76	4	"Hippocratic Oath"	49066.5	René Auberjonois	Story by : Nicholas Corea & Lisa Klink; Teleplay by : Lisa Klink	October 14, 1995	40510-475	7.7
Bashir is captured, with Chief O'Brien, by a rogue group of Jem'Hadar who are attempting to overcome their genetic addiction to Ketracel White. Their leader, Goran'Agar, is able to survive without it and forces Bashir to find out why. Worf is finding it difficult to leave security matters to Security Chief Odo.
77	5	"Indiscretion"	49122.4	LeVar Burton	Story by : Toni Marberry & Jack Treviño; Teleplay by : Nicholas Corea	October 21, 1995	40510-477	7.2
Forced to bring along Dukat on a personal mission to investigate the fate of the Cardassian prison ship Ravinok, which disappeared six years ago, Kira discovers the real reason her old enemy wants to accompany her. Sisko appears to have reservations about Kasidy Yates' coming to live on the station.
78	6	"Rejoined"	49195.5	Avery Brooks	Story by : René Echevarria; Teleplay by : Ronald D. Moore & René Echevarria	October 28, 1995	40510-478	7.0
Dax is reunited with Lenara Kahn, whose previous host was the wife of one of Dax's former hosts, Torias Dax, and the two struggle with their feelings for one another.
79	7	"Little Green Men"	49201.3	James L. Conway	Story by : Toni Marberry & Jack Treviño; Teleplay by : Ira Steven Behr & Robert Hewitt Wolfe	November 4, 1995	40510-480	7.7
Quark, Rom, Nog and Odo are accidentally thrust back in time to Roswell, New Mexico, Earth, in 1947.
80	8	"Starship Down"	49263.5	Alexander Singer	David Alan Mack & John J. Ordover	November 11, 1995	40510-479	7.1
The USS Defiant becomes trapped in the atmosphere of a gas giant while battling with the Jem'Hadar.
81	9	"The Sword of Kahless"	49289	LeVar Burton	Story by : Richard Danus; Teleplay by : Hans Beimler	November 18, 1995	40510-481	6.9
Worf, Dax and a revered Klingon Dahar master, Kor, search for the Sword of Kahless to unite the Klingon Empire.
82	10	"Our Man Bashir"	49300.7	Winrich Kolbe	Story by : Robert Gillan; Teleplay by : Ronald D. Moore	November 25, 1995	40510-482	6.8
Bashir plays a 1960s secret agent in a holosuite, when Garak unexpectedly intrudes, but his help is needed when the DS9 computer uses the holosuite to store the patterns of other crew members during a transporter accident.
83	11	"Homefront"	49370.0	David Livingston	Ira Steven Behr & Robert Hewitt Wolfe	December 30, 1995	40510-483	6.8
Sisko and Odo are brought to Earth when it's suspected Changelings are infiltrating Starfleet. (Part 1 of 2)
84	12	"Paradise Lost"	49482.3	Reza Badiyi	Story by : Ronald D. Moore; Teleplay by : Ira Steven Behr & Robert Hewitt Wolfe	January 6, 1996	40510-484	6.8
As Sisko and Odo prepare for a Dominion invasion, they discover a plot to place the Federation under military control. (Part 2 of 2)
85	13	"Crossfire"	49517.3	Les Landau	René Echevarria	January 27, 1996	40510-485	7.0
Odo's hidden feelings for Kira surface when the visiting Bajoran First Minister, Shakaar Edon, begins to court her.
86	14	"Return to Grace"	49534.2	Jonathan West	Story by : Tom Benko; Teleplay by : Hans Beimler	February 3, 1996	40510-486	6.5
Dukat seeks Kira's help in regaining his rank in the Cardassian Union.
87	15	"Sons of Mogh"	49556.2	David Livingston	Ronald D. Moore	February 10, 1996	40510-487	7.3
Cast out of Klingon society because of Worf's dishonor, his brother, Kurn, asks Worf to kill him. Kira and O'Brien investigate a mysterious high-energy discharge just outside Bajoran space.
88	16	"Bar Association"	49565.1	LeVar Burton	Story by : Barbara J. Lee & Jenifer A. Lee; Teleplay by : Robert Hewitt Wolfe & Ira Steven Behr	February 17, 1996	40510-488	6.7
After he nearly dies because his contract kept him from seeking medical help, Rom organizes the Guild of Restaurant and Casino employees, a union for Quark's downtrodden staff, and they go on strike when their demands for fairer treatment are rejected.
89	17	"Accession"	49600.7	Les Landau	Jane Espenson	February 24, 1996	40510-489	6.5
A famous Bajoran poet, Akorem Laan, who disappeared over 200 years ago, appears from the wormhole and convinces Sisko that he is the true Emissary, but when he announces a return to the pre-occupation caste system, Sisko points out it would disqualify Bajor for membership in The Federation. O'Brien is less than enthusiastic when Keiko announces she's expecting.
90	18	"Rules of Engagement"	49665.3	LeVar Burton	Story by : David Weddle & Bradley Thompson; Teleplay by : Ronald D. Moore	April 6, 1996	40510-490	5.8
Worf accidentally destroys a civilian ship during battle and faces a hearing to determine whether he should be extradited to the Klingon Empire.
91	19	"Hard Time"	49680.5	Alexander Singer	Story by : Daniel Keys Moran & Lynn Barker; Teleplay by : Robert Hewitt Wolfe	April 13, 1996	40510-491	5.7
O'Brien's mind has been altered to create memories of being incarcerated for twenty years on an alien world on charges of espionage and sedition.
92	20	"Shattered Mirror"	49699.1	James L. Conway	Ira Steven Behr & Hans Beimler	April 20, 1996	40510-492	6.5
Sisko attempts to rescue Jake after he is lured into the war-torn Mirror Universe by his mother's living counterpart.
93	21	"The Muse"	49702.2	David Livingston	Story by : René Echevarria & Majel Barrett-Roddenberry; Teleplay by : René Echevarria	April 27, 1996	40510-493	5.3
While Odo assists a pregnant Lwaxana Troi, Jake falls under the spell of a mysterious woman, Onaya.
94	22	"For the Cause"	49729.8	James L. Conway	Story by : Mark Gehred-O'Connell; Teleplay by : Ronald D. Moore	May 4, 1996	40510-494	5.6
Sisko learns that his girlfriend Kasidy might be a Maquis smuggler. Garak has taken interest in Gul Dukat's half Bajoran daughter, Tora Ziyal.
95	23	"To the Death"	49904.2	LeVar Burton	Ira Steven Behr & Robert Hewitt Wolfe	May 11, 1996	40510-495	6.0
Sisko and the Defiant crew join forces with the Jem'Hadar to stop a group of Jem'Hadar renegades from gaining power using an Iconian Gateway discovered in the Gamma Quadrant.
96	24	"The Quickening"	49909.7	René Auberjonois	Naren Shankar	May 18, 1996	40510-496	5.7
Bashir tries to free the population of a Gamma Quadrant world in the Teplan system of an engineered disease left by the Dominion 200 years previously.
97	25	"Body Parts"	49930.3	Avery Brooks	Story by : Louis P. DeSantis & Robert J. Bolivar; Teleplay by : Hans Beimler	June 8, 1996	40510-497	5.1
Quark is diagnosed with a terminal disease, Dorek's Syndrome, and given a week to live. Due to an unavoidable accident on the runabout Volga, Miles and Keiko's unborn baby is transferred to Major Kira by Dr. Bashir.
98	26	"Broken Link"	49962.4	Les Landau	Story by : George A. Brozak; Teleplay by : Ira Steven Behr & Robert Hewitt Wolfe	June 15, 1996	40510-498	6.2
Odo collapses and is taken to the infirmary. Bashir discovers Odo is losing his ability to maintain solid form.

=== Season 5 (1996–97) ===
No. overall	No. in season	Title	Stardate	Directed by	Written by	Original release date	Prod. code	Viewers (millions)
99	1	"Apocalypse Rising"	50015.9	James L. Conway	Ira Steven Behr and Robert Hewitt Wolfe	September 30, 1996	40510-499	5.6
Starfleet assigns Sisko to expose the Changeling infiltrator in the Klingon Empire.
100	2	"The Ship"	50049.3	Kim Friedman	Story by : Pam Wigginton & Rick Cason; Teleplay by : Hans Beimler	October 7, 1996	40510-500	6.0
While exploring in the Gamma Quadrant, Sisko, Dax, Worf and O'Brien see a Jem'Hadar warship crash on a planet's surface. Odo arrests Dr. Bashir and Quark.
101	3	"Looking for par'Mach in All the Wrong Places"	50061.2	Andrew J. Robinson	Ronald D. Moore	October 14, 1996	40510-501	5.7
Worf finds himself attracted to Grilka, Quark's ex wife (episode 3.3), when she visits the station.
102	4	"...Nor the Battle to the Strong"	50098.7	Kim Friedman	Story by : Brice R. Parker; Teleplay by : René Echevarria	October 21, 1996	40510-502	5.0
Dr. Bashir has been away at a conference and Jake Sisko has accompanied him to research a profile he is writing about the doctor. Returning in a runabout, they get a distress call from a Federation colony under Klingon attack.
103	5	"The Assignment"	50124.3	Allan Kroeker	Story by : David R. Long & Robert Lederman; Teleplay by : David Weddle & Bradley Thompson	October 28, 1996	40510-504	N/A
Keiko returns from a journey and informs O'Brien that she is really an entity that has taken possession of his wife's body.
104	6	"Trials and Tribble-ations"	4523.7	Jonathan West	Story by : Ira Steven Behr, Hans Beimler & Robert Hewitt Wolfe; Teleplay by : Ronald D. Moore & René Echevarria	November 4, 1996	40510-503	7.7
Darvin, a disgraced Klingon spy, travels back in time. The DS9 crew must prevent him from altering the timeline. Based on the original Star Trek episode "The Trouble with Tribbles" by David Gerrold.
105	7	"Let He Who Is Without Sin..."	50136.7	René Auberjonois	Robert Hewitt Wolfe and Ira Steven Behr	November 11, 1996	40510-505	7.0
Worf and Dax take a vacation on the pleasure planet, Risa, and encounter unexpected dangers.
106	8	"Things Past"	50144.6	LeVar Burton	Michael Taylor	November 18, 1996	40510-506	6.0
Sisko, Odo, Dax and Garak are found unconscious. While Bashir attempts to revive their bodies, the four wake up during the Cardassian occupation of Bajor several years earlier.
107	9	"The Ascent"	50245.2	Allan Kroeker	Ira Steven Behr and Robert Hewitt Wolfe	November 25, 1996	40510-507	6.0
Forced to crash-land on a desolate planet, Odo and Quark must climb a mountain to transmit a distress signal. Jake and Nog (temporarily back at DS9) find sharing quarters isn't as enjoyable as they thought it would be.
108	10	"Rapture"	50387.9	Jonathan West	Story by : L.J. Strom; Teleplay by : Hans Beimler	December 30, 1996	40510-508	6.0
An accident causes Sisko to have prophetic visions. When he finds an ancient Bajoran city, lost for 20,000 years, Kai Winn reconsiders her attitude towards him.
109	11	"The Darkness and the Light"	50416.2	Mike Vejar	Story by : Bryan Fuller; Teleplay by : Ronald D. Moore	January 6, 1997	40510-509	6.0
Someone is killing former members of Kira's resistance cell and she might be next.
110	12	"The Begotten"	50430.1	Jesús Salvador Treviño	René Echevarria	January 27, 1997	40510-510	6.2
When Quark discovers an infant Changeling, it has a profound effect on Odo. Meanwhile, Kira goes into labor.
111	13	"For the Uniform"	50485.2	Victor Lobl	Peter Allan Fields	February 3, 1997	40510-511	6.0
Michael Eddington returns and Sisko becomes obsessed with catching him.
112	14	"In Purgatory's Shadow"	50560.1	Gabrielle Beaumont	Robert Hewitt Wolfe and Ira Steven Behr	February 10, 1997	40510-512	6.7
Worf and Garak journey to the Gamma Quadrant to investigate a coded Cardassian message. (Part 1 of 2)
113	15	"By Inferno's Light"	50564.2	Les Landau	Ira Steven Behr and Robert Hewitt Wolfe	February 17, 1997	40510-513	6.2
Gul Dukat aligns the Cardassians with the Dominion. The station must deal with a Changeling infiltrator. (Part 2 of 2)
114	16	"Doctor Bashir, I Presume?"	50590.1	David Livingston	Story by : Jimmy Diggs; Teleplay by : Ronald D. Moore	February 24, 1997	40510-514	5.6
Julian Bashir is selected to become the model for a Long-term Medical Hologram, until a family secret is revealed. Rom has great difficulty in telling Leeta something.
115	17	"A Simple Investigation"	50606.6	John T. Kretchmer	René Echevarria	March 31, 1997	40510-515	5.2
Odo falls in love with a woman, Arissa, involved in the Orion Syndicate.
116	18	"Business as Usual"	50675.5	Siddig El Fadil	Bradley Thompson and David Weddle	April 7, 1997	40510-516	5.3
Quark's cousin Gaila, knowing Quark is desperate for funds, takes him on as a junior partner in his highly lucrative arms dealing business. With his mother Keiko away dealing with a plague on Bajor, Yoshi O'Brien will only stop crying when Miles holds him, making things difficult.
117	19	"Ties of Blood and Water"	50712.5	Avery Brooks	Story by : Edmund Newton & Robbin L. Slocum; Teleplay by : Robert Hewitt Wolfe	April 14, 1997	40510-517	N/A
Tekeny Ghemor ("Second Skin") arrives on Deep Space Nine and reveals that he is dying.
118	20	"Ferengi Love Songs"	50701.2	René Auberjonois	Ira Steven Behr and Hans Beimler	April 21, 1997	40510-518	4.8
At the end of his rope, Quark returns home and discovers Moogie has a secret lover.
119	21	"Soldiers of the Empire"	50839.2	LeVar Burton	Ronald D. Moore	April 28, 1997	40510-519	5.2
Martok, Worf and Dax go on a mission aboard a Klingon ship to search for a missing Klingon vessel. However, Martok's uneasiness about battle, a result of his captivity, affects his crew's morale.
120	22	"Children of Time"	50814.2	Allan Kroeker	Story by : Gary Holland and Ethan H. Calk; Teleplay by : René Echevarria	May 5, 1997	40510-520	5.5
An accident causes the crew to meet their own descendants — and presents them with an ethical dilemma.
121	23	"Blaze of Glory"	50862.4	Kim Friedman	Robert Hewitt Wolfe and Ira Steven Behr	May 12, 1997	40510-521	N/A
An act of desperation by the Maquis could plunge the Federation into war: The Maquis have thirty cloaked missiles heading to Cardassia.
122	24	"Empok Nor"	50901.7	Mike Vejar	Story by : Bryan Fuller; Teleplay by : Hans Beimler	May 19, 1997	40510-522	4.9
O'Brien, Garak, Nog and an engineering team go to Deep Space Nine's abandoned sister space station, Empok Nor, to salvage components. The away team soon discover that all is not as it seems.
123	25	"In the Cards"	50929.4	Michael Dorn	Story by : Truly Barr Clark & Scott J. Neal; Teleplay by : Ronald D. Moore	June 9, 1997	40510-523	4.5
Jake wants to give his father a present to cheer him up, a 1951 Willie Mays baseball card. He enlists Nog to help him obtain it, but they run into complications with a mysterious geneticist, Dr. Giger. Kai Winn, worried over the prospect of a Federation/Dominion war and its effects on Bajor, meets with Dominion representative Weyoun.
124	26	"Call to Arms"	50975.2	Allan Kroeker	Ira Steven Behr and Robert Hewitt Wolfe	June 16, 1997	40510-524	5.2
Faced with the realization that the Dominion are taking over the Alpha Quadrant, Sisko decides to mine the entrance to the wormhole with self-replicating cloaked mines, thus beginning the Dominion War.

=== Season 6 (1997–98) ===
No. overall	No. in season	Title	Stardate	Directed by	Written by	Original release date	Prod. code	Viewers (millions)
125	1	"A Time to Stand"	Unknown	Allan Kroeker	Ira Steven Behr & Hans Beimler	September 27, 1997	40510-525	5.4
Three months into the war, DS9 is still under Dominion control. Sisko and his crew are given a mission to destroy a vital Ketracel White facility deep in Dominion space using a captured Jem'Hadar ship. Jake is working for the Federation News Service. Odo is head of Terok Nor's security supported by the Vorta Weyoun.
126	2	"Rocks and Shoals"	51107.2	Mike Vejar	Ronald D. Moore	October 4, 1997	40510-527	5.2
Sisko and his tired crew crash on a planet where they encounter a band of Jem'Hadar.
127	3	"Sons and Daughters"	Unknown	Jesús Salvador Treviño	Bradley Thompson & David Weddle	October 11, 1997	40510-526	4.8
While on General Martok's ship Worf is reunited with his estranged son, Alexander.
128	4	"Behind the Lines"	51149.5	LeVar Burton	René Echevarria	October 18, 1997	40510-528	5.1
Sisko creates a risky plan to disable a critical Dominion sensor array able to see five sectors out, while on Terok Nor, Kira, Jake, Rom and Odo seek to undermine the Cardassian/Dominion Alliance.
129	5	"Favor the Bold"	Unknown	Winrich Kolbe	Ira Steven Behr & Hans Beimler	October 25, 1997	40510-529	6.0
Learning of thousands of Dominion reinforcements gathering in the Gamma Quadrant, Sisko initiates a plan to retake Deep Space Nine and secure the wormhole before the minefield is detonated. (Part 1 of 2)
130	6	"Sacrifice of Angels"	Unknown	Allan Kroeker	Ira Steven Behr & Hans Beimler	November 1, 1997	40510-530	6.4
Sisko commands the Defiant and 600 Federation ships against a Dominion/Cardassian armada to retake Deep Space Nine. Damar has Kira, Jake and Leeta arrested. (Part 2 of 2)
131	7	"You Are Cordially Invited"	51247.5	David Livingston	Ronald D. Moore	November 8, 1997	40510-531	6.5
Worf's plans for a traditional Klingon wedding hinge on Martok's demanding wife, Sirella, accepting Dax into their family.
132	8	"Resurrection"	Unknown	LeVar Burton	Michael Taylor	November 15, 1997	40510-532	5.2
The Mirror Universe counterpart of Kira's dead love, Vedek Bareil, takes her hostage on Deep Space Nine as he is running from the evil Alliance of his universe.
133	9	"Statistical Probabilities"	Unknown	Anson Williams	Story by : Pam Pietroforte; Teleplay by : René Echevarria	November 22, 1997	40510-533	5.1
Bashir attempts to reintegrate genetically engineered misfits into society, but they are asked by Starfleet to become a think tank when they provide insightful analysis of upcoming Dominion peace talks.
134	10	"The Magnificent Ferengi"	Unknown	Chip Chalmers	Ira Steven Behr & Hans Beimler	December 27, 1997	40510-534	5.0
Quark mounts a rescue mission when his mother, Ishka, is captured by the Dominion and Grand Nagus Zek offers a reward for her return.
135	11	"Waltz"	51413.6	René Auberjonois	Ronald D. Moore	January 3, 1998	40510-535	4.9
An attack on the Starfleet ship carrying Gul Dukat to a hearing for war crimes, as well as Captain Sisko who is to testify at the hearing, leaves the two of them stranded on a deserted planet together.
136	12	"Who Mourns for Morn?"	Unknown	Victor Lobl	Mark Gehred-O'Connell	January 31, 1998	40510-536	5.3
Morn is killed in an ion storm and Sisko informs Quark that Morn left his entire estate to him. But Quark has a little competition.
137	13	"Far Beyond the Stars"	Unknown	Avery Brooks	Story by : Marc Scott Zicree; Teleplay by : Ira Steven Behr & Hans Beimler	February 7, 1998	40510-538	4.8
As Sisko considers leaving Starfleet due to the destruction of Captain Swofford's ship, the Cortez, he has a vision of himself as a science fiction writer in the 1950s.
138	14	"One Little Ship"	51474.2	Allan Kroeker	David Weddle & Bradley Thompson	February 14, 1998	40510-537	5.1
Dax, O'Brien and Bashir board a runabout, which is shrunken to four inches long as they investigate a rare subspace compression phenomenon.
139	15	"Honor Among Thieves"	Unknown	Allan Eastman	Story by : Philip Kim; Teleplay by : René Echevarria	February 21, 1998	40510-539	4.6
Starfleet Intelligence recruits Chief O'Brien to infiltrate the Orion Syndicate to find a Starfleet informant.
140	16	"Change of Heart"	51597.2	David Livingston	Ronald D. Moore	February 28, 1998	40510-540	5.5
When Jadzia Dax is critically injured on an away mission, Worf must choose between saving his wife or completing their assignment. O'Brien becomes obsessed with beating Quark at Tongo.
141	17	"Wrongs Darker Than Death or Night"	Unknown	Jonathan West	Ira Steven Behr & Hans Beimler	March 28, 1998	40510-541	4.6
When Dukat tells Kira that her mother, Kira Meru, did not die when Nerys was three, but was actually Dukat's lover, Kira goes into the past using the Bajoran Orb of Time to find the truth.
142	18	"Inquisition"	Unknown	Michael Dorn	Bradley Thompson & David Weddle	April 4, 1998	40510-542	4.7
Dr Bashir is busy wrapping up unfinished tasks prior to departing DS9 to attend a medical conference. Just prior to his departure, an Internal Affairs unit under the command of an individual named Sloan, arrive and announce they will be interviewing all the senior staff. Things take a worrying turn for the good doctor when he realises that he is the subject of the investigation and Sloan accuses him of spying for the Dominion.
143	19	"In the Pale Moonlight"	51721.3	Victor Lobl	Story by : Peter Allan Fields; Teleplay by : Michael Taylor	April 11, 1998	40510-543	4.8
Weary of posting yet another weekly casualty list, Captain Sisko becomes determined to get the Romulans to join the war against the Dominion. He seeks the shady expertise of Garak to help achieve his objective. But the bloody reality of the phrase “whatever it takes”, soon finds Sisko’s ethics being compromised to breaking point in pursuit of his goal.
144	20	"His Way"	Unknown	Allan Kroeker	Ira Steven Behr & Hans Beimler	April 18, 1998	40510-544	4.3
Bashir shows off a new Holosuite program of a martini lounge with a 1960s Vegas singer named Vic Fontaine who is very perceptive; and gives advice to Odo when Kira visits her ex-lover Shakaar.
145	21	"The Reckoning"	Unknown	Jesús Salvador Treviño	Story by : Harry M. Werksman & Gabrielle Stanton; Teleplay by : David Weddle & Bradley Thompson	April 25, 1998	40510-545	4.2
Sisko is called to Bajor when an ancient tablet addressing the Emissary is discovered at B'hala.
146	22	"Valiant"	51825.4	Mike Vejar	Ronald D. Moore	May 2, 1998	40510-546	4.6
Jake and Nog come under attack by the Jem'Hadar and are rescued by a rogue Defiant class starship, the Valiant, under the command of Starfleet Red Squadron cadets.
147	23	"Profit and Lace"	Unknown	Siddig El Faddil	Ira Steven Behr & Hans Beimler	May 9, 1998	40510-547	4.2
Quark helps out when Zek's status as the Ferengi Grand Nagus is put in jeopardy by proposing equal rights for Ferengi females.
148	24	"Time's Orphan"	Unknown	Allan Kroeker	Story by : Joe Menosky; Teleplay by : David Weddle & Bradley Thompson	May 16, 1998	40510-548	4.6
Molly O'Brien disappears in a vortex and reappears as an 18-year-old woman, but she is now feral, bringing great difficulty for her parents.
149	25	"The Sound of Her Voice"	51948.3	Winrich Kolbe	Story by : Pam Pietroforte; Teleplay by : Ronald D. Moore	June 6, 1998	40510-549	4.1
The Defiant picks up a distress call from Captain Lisa Cusak, whose escape pod has crashed on a remote planet following the destruction of her ship, the Olympia.
150	26	"Tears of the Prophets"	Unknown	Allan Kroeker	Ira Steven Behr & Hans Beimler	June 13, 1998	40510-550	4.1
Starfleet Command begins an offensive against the Dominion, and Sisko is chosen to lead the invasion of Cardassia, but the Cardassian/Dominion Alliance has secretly reinforced their borders with unmanned orbital weapons platforms.

=== Season 7 (1998–99) ===
No. overall	No. in season	Title	Stardate	Directed by	Written by	Original release date	Prod. code	Viewers (millions)
151	1	"Image in the Sand"	Unknown	Les Landau	Ira Steven Behr & Hans Beimler	September 30, 1998	40510-551	4.4
With the Bajoran wormhole collapsed, Sisko struggles for a way to contact the Bajoran Prophets. The Romulans receive permission from the Bajorans to open a military hospital on the moon Derna. General Martok offers Worf an opportunity to gain admission to Sto'Vo'Kor for Jadzia.
152	2	"Shadows and Symbols"	52152.6	Allan Kroeker	Ira Steven Behr & Hans Beimler	October 7, 1998	40510-552	4.2
A new Dax appears on the scene. Sisko's quest leads him to the truth about his existence. The discovery that the Romulan hospital is heavily armed leads Colonel Kira to set up a blockade of Derna. Bashir, O'Brien and, surprisingly, Quark join Worf and Martok on a dangerous mission to destroy the Dominion shipyard.
153	3	"Afterimage"	Unknown	Les Landau	René Echevarria	October 14, 1998	40510-553	4.3
Everyone who knew Jadzia Dax reacts strongly to Ezri Dax's presence, particularly Worf. Garak suffers from bad attacks of claustrophobia.
154	4	"Take Me Out to the Holosuite"	Unknown	Chip Chalmers	Ronald D. Moore	October 21, 1998	40510-554	4.7
Sisko must train his staff to play baseball when the Vulcan Captain Solok, an old rival of his, challenges Sisko to a game while his ship is being repaired.
155	5	"Chrysalis"	Unknown	Jonathan West	René Echevarria	October 28, 1998	40510-555	4.3
Bashir falls for a genetically enhanced patient, Sarina Douglas, that he brought out of a catatonic state using an experimental medical procedure.
156	6	"Treachery, Faith and the Great River"	Unknown	Steve Posey	Story by : Philip Kim; Teleplay by : David Weddle & Bradley Thompson	November 4, 1998	40510-556	4.8
A Vorta defector, Weyoun-6, gives Odo valuable information in exchange for asylum. Weyoun-7, the next clone in the series, pursues them. Nog engages in a series of barters to get a Graviton Stabilizer for Miles.
157	7	"Once More unto the Breach"	Unknown	Allan Kroeker	Ronald D. Moore	November 11, 1998	40510-557	4.5
Kor (Ep 2.19, "Blood Oath" & 4.9, "The Sword of Kahless"), an aging Klingon hero, asks Worf to find him a battle assignment. Martok plans a "cavalry raid" of five birds of prey, hitting several key targets behind enemy lines to throw them off balance.
158	8	"The Siege of AR-558"	Unknown	Winrich Kolbe	Ira Steven Behr & Hans Beimler	November 18, 1998	40510-558	4.5
Sisko and crew relieve Starfleet troops under siege by Jem'Hadar at a key communications outpost, AR-558, the largest Dominion communications array in the sector.
159	9	"Covenant"	Unknown	John Kretchmer	René Echevarria	November 25, 1998	40510-559	4.4
Dukat, now a religious leader of a Bajoran Pah-Wraith cult, holds Kira hostage. Mika, one of Dukat's followers, gives birth to a half-Cardassian child.
160	10	"It's Only a Paper Moon"	52235.7	Anson Williams	Story by : David Alan Mack & John J. Ordover; Teleplay by : Ronald D. Moore	December 30, 1998	40510-560	4.3
Nog struggles with PTSD from the traumatic battle of AR-558 where he lost his leg. So, he begins living with Vic Fontaine.
161	11	"Prodigal Daughter"	Unknown	Victor Lobl	David Weddle & Bradley Thompson	January 6, 1999	40510-561	4.3
Ezri goes to New Sydney to find O'Brien and uncovers some disturbing family secrets. Miles goes in search of the widow of Liam Bilby, Morica Bilby, whom he befriended in an undercover operation.
162	12	"The Emperor's New Cloak"	Unknown	LeVar Burton	Ira Steven Behr & Hans Beimler	February 3, 1999	40510-562	4.6
Quark and Rom cross into the alternate universe to rescue Grand Nagus Zek.
163	13	"Field of Fire"	Unknown	Tony Dow	Robert Hewitt Wolfe	February 10, 1999	40510-563	4.1
Ezri summons Joran, a homicidal Dax incarnation from her past, for help in understanding the mind of a serial killer loose on the station.
164	14	"Chimera"	Unknown	Steve Posey	René Echevarria	February 17, 1999	40510-564	4.3
A Changeling, Laas, asks Odo to leave the station and join his search for other shapeshifters.
165	15	"Badda-Bing Badda-Bang"	Unknown	Mike Vejar	Ira Steven Behr & Hans Beimler	February 24, 1999	40510-566	4.1
The crew attempt to help Vic Fontaine when Vic's hotel is bought by mobsters Frankie Eyes and Carl Zeemo.
166	16	"Inter Arma Enim Silent Leges"	Unknown	David Livingston	Ronald D. Moore	March 3, 1999	40510-565	4.1
While attending a diplomatic conference on Romulus, Bashir becomes an unwilling pawn of Section 31.
167	17	"Penumbra"	52576.2	Steve Posey	René Echevarria	April 7, 1999	40510-567	4.4
Ezri searches for a missing Worf; Sisko makes plans to marry Kasidy Yates.
168	18	"'Til Death Do Us Part"	Unknown	Winrich Kolbe	Bradley Thompson & David Weddle	April 14, 1999	40510-568	4.1
Captured by the Breen, Ezri and Worf undergo mental torture. Sisko agonizes over his broken engagement. Kai Winn receives her first vision; she learns a messenger will be sent to her. It is a simple Bajoran farmer, who is actually Gul Dukat in disguise.
169	19	"Strange Bedfellows"	Unknown	René Auberjonois	Ronald D. Moore	April 21, 1999	40510-569	4.2
An alliance is born between the Dominion and the Breen which will prove devastating for the Federation. Ezri and Worf are sentenced to death on Cardassia. Initially horrified, Kai Winn eventually accepts her visions are from the Pah Wraiths.
170	20	"The Changing Face of Evil"	Unknown	Mike Vejar	Ira Steven Behr & Hans Beimler	April 28, 1999	40510-570	4.5
The war reaches a crucial turning point when the Dominion retakes the Chin'Toka system, the only Allied foothold in enemy space. Winn learns that Dukat plans to release the Pah-Wraiths. Damar begins a revolt against the Dominion.
171	21	"When It Rains..."	Unknown	Michael Dorn	Story by : René Echevarria and Spike Steingasser; Teleplay by : René Echevarria	May 5, 1999	40510-571	4.3
Sisko orders Kira, Garak and Odo to Cardassia to assist Cardassians in resistance tactics as Damar's rebellion gains ground. Bashir makes a shocking discovery about the disease that is ravaging the Founders. Dukat's cover has been blown by Sobor. Gowron arrives on DS9.
172	22	"Tacking into the Wind"	Unknown	Mike Vejar	Ronald D. Moore	May 12, 1999	40510-572	4.4
Kira masterminds a plot to steal a Breen energy-dampening weapon. Gowron's political vendetta against Martok is endangering the war effort and prompts Worf to instigate a power shift in the Klingon Empire.
173	23	"Extreme Measures"	52645.7	Steve Posey	David Weddle & Bradley Thompson	May 19, 1999	40510-573	4.4
As Odo falls gravely ill to the shape-shifter disease, Bashir and O'Brien must get inside the mind of Luther Sloan, who holds Odo's cure.
174	24	"The Dogs of War"	52861.3	Avery Brooks	Story by : Peter Allan Fields; Teleplay by : René Echevarria & Ronald D. Moore	May 26, 1999	40510-574	3.7
Sisko takes command of a new ship. Kira, Damar, and Garak stumble into a Dominion ambush on Cardassia; they also discover the entire resistance organization has been destroyed. Ezri and Julian finally clear the air with each other. Grand Nagus Zek has an announcement to make, as does Kasidy Sisko.
175	25	"What You Leave Behind"	Unknown	Allan Kroeker	Ira Steven Behr & Hans Beimler	June 2, 1999	40510-749 (575–576)	5.4
176	26	"What You Leave Behind"	Unknown	Allan Kroeker	Ira Steven Behr & Hans Beimler	June 2, 1999	40510-749 (575–576)	5.4
Sisko leads the Federation/Klingon/Romulan alliance in the offensive on the Cardassian homeworld, aided by Damar's grassroots resistance campaign -- and a surprise, last-minute ally. Dukat and Winn journey to the fire caves to release the Pah'Wraiths.: Originally shown as a two-hour series finale, but in later syndication is shown as two episodes.

== Reception ==
In 1999, Trek Nation's Greg Fuller said the series had been successful among its peers, writing: "Even when it became a near-serial show (usually, long-term serial shows are ratings disasters -- witness Babylon 5) airing in prime-time in less than 60 percent of the nation, DS9 managed well over a 4.0 average in its final two years. As a general rule, a syndicated show needs to maintain a 3.0 to be successful, DS9 always maintained that despite the strikes against it."

In 2019, CBR rated all 31 seasons (across seven series at that time, including the first season of Star Trek: Discovery) of the Star Trek franchise, separately ranking each season of each series. They rated Season 6 of Star Trek: Deep Space Nine as the very best season of any Star Trek season up to that time.

CBR rankings

- 1 – Season 6
- 6 – Season 7
- 15 – Season 5
- 18 – Season 2
- 20 – Season 3
- 21 – Season 4
- 26 – Season 1

In 2016, The Washington Post called the Dominion war story arc in the later seasons of Star Trek: Deep Space Nine possibly the "richest narrative" of the Star Trek universe.

== See also ==
- Lists of Star Trek episodes
