= Badda-Bing Badda-Bang =

- Star Trek: Deep Space Nine episode
- Episode no.: Season 7 Episode 15
- Directed by: Mike Vejar
- Written by: Ira Steven Behr; Hans Beimler
- Cinematography by: Jonathan West
- Production code: 566
- Original air date: February 22, 1999

Guest appearances
- James Darren as Vic Fontaine; Penny Johnson as Kasidy Yates; Marc Lawrence as Mr. Zeemo; Mike Starr as Tony Cicci; Robert Miano as Frankie Eyes; Aron Eisenberg as Nog; Bobby Reilly as Countman; Chip Mayer as Guard; James Wellington as Al

Episode chronology
| ← Previous "Chimera" | Next → "Inter Arma Enim Silent Leges" |
- Star Trek: Deep Space Nine season 7

"Badda-Bing Badda-Bang" is the 165th episode of the syndicated American science fiction television series Star Trek: Deep Space Nine, the 15th episode of the seventh season.

Set in the 24th century, the series follows the adventures on the space station Deep Space Nine. This episode centers on a holosuite, a fictional technology that uses holograms to create immersive simulated environments. In this episode, in a holosuite simulation of 1960s Las Vegas, lounge singer Vic Fontaine (James Darren) loses his job, and the crew of Deep Space Nine must stage a heist to restore the holosuite program to the way it was before.

== Plot ==
Julian Bashir and Miles O'Brien enjoy an evening in the holosuite at Vic Fontaine's hotel lounge, when the lounge suddenly changes into a noisy cabaret. Frankie Eyes, a mobster and Vic's longtime rival, shows up to throw Vic out, announcing that he has bought the hotel. Bashir and O'Brien try to delete the character of Frankie from the simulation, but to no avail.

Bashir learns that, short of resetting the simulation, Frankie can only be eliminated by means that are appropriate to the 1960s Las Vegas setting. Since resetting the program would result in Vic forgetting all the experiences he has shared with the crew of Deep Space Nine, they recruit their friends and crewmates to defeat Frankie within the structure of the simulation. Although Captain Benjamin Sisko initially dislikes the program, citing the pervasive racism against Black people in the real 1960s Las Vegas, his girlfriend Kasidy Yates eventually persuades him to participate.

DS9 crew members Kira and Odo befriend Frankie and his bodyguard Cicci in the simulation, and learn that Frankie works for crime boss Carl Zeemo, who expects to receive a share of the hotel's huge daily profits. The crew hatches a plan to rob the hotel casino the night before Zeemo arrives by breaking into the safe in Frankie's count room, hoping Zeemo will have Frankie killed in retaliation for not having his money. Sisko will pose as a high roller to draw attention away from the count room; Yates will start a dispute with O'Brien to distract the security guard; Ezri Dax, posing as a waitress, will bring the accountant in the count room a martini that has been drugged by Bashir, forcing him to leave the safe unattended; and Nog will crack the safe.

The evening of the heist presents several unexpected complications to the plan—especially when Nog discovers that the lock on the safe is of a different type than expected. While he struggles to crack the lock, Zeemo arrives a day early to pick up his cash. Vic and the others fabricate enough distractions to stall him until Nog can open the safe and he and Odo slip away with the cash. After Zeemo finds the safe empty, his thugs lead Frankie and Cicci out of the casino—and Vic's lounge is restored to the way it was originally. Vic takes the stage with his band, and Sisko joins him in a duet of "The Best Is Yet to Come".

== Cast note ==
Actor Robert O'Reilly, who played the recurring role of the Klingon chancellor Gowron on the series, appears in a different role in this episode as one of the holographic human casino accountants. He is credited as “Bobby Reilly” instead of "Robert O'Reilly" for this role.

== Reception ==
This had Nielsen ratings of 4.1 points when it was broadcast on television in 1999, equating to over 4 million television viewers at that time. In 2018, it had rating of 8.3/10 on 159 ratings at TV.com. In 2019, CBR ranked this the 17th best holodeck-themed episode of all Star Trek franchise episodes up to that time.

In 2020, ScreenRant ranked this episode the 7th funniest episode of all Star Trek television episodes, and said it was reminiscent of the 1960 film Ocean's 11.
