= Vic Fontaine =

Fictional character from Star Trek: Deep Space Nine

- Star Trek: Deep Space Nine character
- Season 7 promotional image of James Darren as Vic Fontaine
- First appearance: "His Way"; April 20, 1998
- Last appearance: "What You Leave Behind"; May 31, 1999
- Created by: Ira Steven Behr
- Portrayed by: James Darren

In-universe information
- Species: Hologram of human
- Occupation: Singer; entertainer; bar owner

Vic Fontaine is a fictional character who appeared in the sixth and seventh seasons of the American science fiction television series Star Trek: Deep Space Nine. Portrayed by James Darren, he is a holographic representation of a 1960s-era Las Vegas Rat Pack–style singer and entertainer, as part of a program run in the holosuites at Quark's bar. The character was developed from an idea by executive producer Ira Steven Behr, who had sought to introduce a character of that type during the fourth season to be played by Frank Sinatra, Jr. After Sinatra turned down the role, it was considered during the following season, to be played by Steve Lawrence, but once again was not used. Darren landed the role after Behr met him at a memorabilia show in North Hollywood and had him invited to audition.

The character made his first appearance in the episode "His Way", and returned later in the sixth season in "Tears of the Prophets" and throughout the seventh season. Fontaine represented a source of romantic advice for the crew, helping to get Odo (René Auberjonois) and Kira Nerys (Nana Visitor) together as well as aiding Quark (Armin Shimerman) and Julian Bashir (Alexander Siddig) to move on from their love of Jadzia Dax (Terry Farrell). He also helps Nog (Aron Eisenberg) to recover from the loss of his leg in "It's Only a Paper Moon". Returning the favor in "Badda-Bing Badda-Bang", the crew help Fontaine get his bar back after it is taken over by the American Mafia. The crew return to the bar one final time in the series finale, "What You Leave Behind", for the celebration party following the victory over the Dominion.

Episodes such as "His Way" and "It's Only a Paper Moon" were praised, and "Badda-Bing Badda-Bang" was compared to the famed 1960's Ocean's 11. The character itself was praised by critics, who specifically said that the premise should not have worked but did, due to both the writing and Darren's performances.

== Concept and development ==
Executive producer Ira Steven Behr had long sought to introduce a Rat Pack-style character to Star Trek: Deep Space Nine since the fourth season, as he was a lifelong fan of 1960s-era Las Vegas and the music of that period. The initial idea was that the character would be someone who could give out romantic advice, and that it would not appear in every episode but only as and when it was needed. In preparation, Behr and Robert Hewitt Wolfe wrote a scene in order to flesh out the character, while Behr immediately had a performer in mind to play the new character: Frank Sinatra Jr., a known fan of Star Trek. Casting director Ron Surma got in touch with Sinatra, who thought that it would be a funny idea. Sinatra wanted to play an alien and not the singer character they had in mind, so the idea was shelved for the time being.

During the production of the fifth season episode "A Simple Investigation", it was decided to insert the scene that Behr and Wolfe had previously created. Behr mused at the time that while Sinatra might not want to portray the character, perhaps someone similar to Steve Lawrence would. Behr named the character Vic Fontaine, a combination of two names he had been planning to use for some time. Some time later, Behr noticed a similarity in naming between the new character and one from the 1972 film The Godfather. Lawrence was unavailable and the scene proved too long to be included in the episode, so once again the idea was put on hold. Behr was unsure how to write the character into the show until it became apparent that it could be included as part of the relationship between Odo and Kira Nerys in the episode "Children of Time". Rather than film an individual scene, he decided that an entire 1960s-era Las Vegas themed episode should be created, resulting in the production of "His Way".

=== "His Way" ===
Several people were interviewed for the part, including Tom Jones, Robert Goulet, and Jerry Vale. Meanwhile, Behr and a friend attended a memorabilia show at the Beverly Garland Hotel in North Hollywood, where James Darren was signing autographs. Darren had not wanted to attend the event, but had been convinced otherwise. Behr thought he was so charming that he wanted to talk to him about the role on the spot, but his friend talked him out of it as he was worried that Darren would think he was insane. Surma got in touch with Darren at Behr's prompting. Darren initially rejected the role three times, thinking that a real singer playing a role as a singer, is too "on the nose". Darren's agent eventually convinced him to actually read the script. He loved playing the character while reading it ten times to absorb the personality enough to avoid having to memorize lines. He later called it a "dream come true".

Darren came in for casting and began talking about knowing where to source the appropriate tuxedos, and that he could wear a pair of Dean Martin's shoes that he owned. During the course of the meeting, Behr became convinced that Darren was already performing the Fontaine piece, having moved into it seamlessly in conversation. Darren had deliberately avoided simply reading the script at rehearsal, as he disliked doing cold reads; instead, he was intentionally improvising lines that he thought that the character would say. Yet he did so in a way that he recalls prompting Behr to say, "Man, it's funny, I wrote a line just like that for Vic." After Darren left, Behr excitedly told the other writers how good he was, but that perhaps they should still see other actors. Producer Hans Beimler replied, "Are you out of your mind? What are you talking about? Vic Fontaine was just in the room. There's no question, there's no question! He's the guy!"

Darren was subsequently hired for the role. He thought that Fontaine was a combination of Martin and Frank Sinatra, and found that a mention by the character to traveling with that duo to Vegas in the "His Way" script caused him to think about the past, as he had travelled with Sinatra, Jr. and Nancy Sinatra in Sinatra's private plane to Las Vegas to see Sinatra and Martin play at the Sands Hotel and Casino on several occasions. At the time, Darren was unsure whether it was to be a recurring role or not, but had enjoyed the experience. Fontaine is in the final episode of the season, "Tears of the Prophets", and several episodes throughout season seven.

== Appearances ==
Vic Fontaine is first introduced in the episode "His Way" as a romantically insightful hologram who, uniquely for holodeck characters, is aware that he's a hologram. He forms part of a new Rat Pack-style Las Vegas bar program owned by Doctor Julian Bashir (Alexander Siddig). Several of the main crew are present for his performance of "You're Nobody till Somebody Loves You". Afterwards, Odo (René Auberjonois) seeks some advice in private from Fontaine about his feelings for Kira Nerys (Nana Visitor). The hologram helps Odo practice with another hologram that looks like Kira but does not act correctly, but Odo finds that when the real version returns to the station that they can barely interact. Fontaine transfers himself into Kira's meditation holo-program and invites her to dinner; curious, she accepts. Fontaine invites Odo back to his program, saying that the holo-Kira now acts exactly like her. The two get together in the holodeck and the date goes well until Odo reveals that he thinks that the real Kira is actually a hologram. The ruse revealed, both look accusingly at Fontaine and leave. But once outside on the promenade, the duo begin to argue, resulting in Odo kissing Kira.

During the second appearance of the character in "Tears of the Prophets", Bashir and Quark (Armin Shimerman) run Fontaine's program in an attempt to cheer themselves up after realising that they will never have a chance with Jadzia Dax (Terry Farrell) because of her relationship with Worf (Michael Dorn). The hologram advises them to move on with their lives. In the first episode of the seventh season, "Image in the Sand", Worf is mourning the death of Jadzia. He goes to Fontaine and asks him to sing the Frank Sinatra song "All the Way". Fontaine sings the song reluctantly, and partway through, Worf begins to destroy the bar in his grief-stricken rage. At the start of "The Siege of AR-558", Fontaine auditions Rom (Max Grodénchik) as a new lounge singer. He does not get the job. Later, while the Federation troops are under siege by the Jem'Hadar, Bashir plays Fontaine's recording of "I'll Be Seeing You" over a sound system to raise morale. As a result of him losing his leg during the siege, in "It's Only a Paper Moon", Nog (Aron Eisenberg) keeps playing that song in private upon his return to Deep Space Nine. He goes to the holosuite to play the Fontaine program, and begins to rely on it, effectively moving into the holosuite permanently.

Ezri Dax (Nicole de Boer), the station's counselor, has concerns with Nog living in a fictional world and speaks to Fontaine, who explains that he has a plan to rectify the situation. Fontaine convinces Nog that the bar is in trouble and he needs some help with the accounts; the Ferengi uses his business knowledge to help the hologram. Fontaine befriends Nog and after a while tries to convince him to return to the outside world following prompting by Ezri. Nog refuses to leave, resulting in Fontaine shutting down his program and refusing to let it restart. Fontaine appears to Nog in an otherwise empty holosuite, and Nog confesses that his injury has made him fear death and the ongoing war with the Dominion. Fontaine counsels Nog, who feels strong enough to leave the holosuite and return to duty. Shortly after he resumes his role back on the station, Nog returns to Fontaine to inform him that he has convinced Quark to leave the program running continuously to allow Vic to have a life of his own.

A possible Mirror Universe version of Vic Fontaine appears in "The Emperor's New Cloak". This version of Fontaine appears to be human (no explanation for this is given), and is shot dead during a phaser battle.

In "Badda-Bing Badda-Bang", as part of a story programmed into the "Vic Fontaine" holodeck setting, Fontaine is forced out of his club by the American Mafia, who turn it into a casino. The rest of the crew want Fontaine's bar back the way it was, and are faced with either resetting the program and losing the hologram's memory of the crew, or playing along with the story and returning the bar to Vic. So Captain Benjamin Sisko (Avery Brooks) leads a team to steal the casino's takings. Upon their success, the program restores the bar to the way it was, and Fontaine celebrates by singing "The Best Is Yet to Come" to the crew. During the finale of Deep Space Nine, "What You Leave Behind", Quark passes the time during the attack on Cardassia Prime by playing Go Fish with Fontaine. Later, after the victory and the defeat of the Dominion, the crew return to Vic's bar for a celebratory party.

== Reception ==
The character of Vic Fontaine was received with mixed reviews by both critics and the public. While Keith DeCandido disliked the idea of the Fontaine program in his review of "His Way" for Tor.com, saying that "It's silly, it's frivolous, it raises all kinds of ethical conundrums that the show never shows the remotest interest in investigating", he said that he enjoyed Darren's performance, which caused him to smile every time Darren spoke. Zack Handlen praised the 1960s scenes in "His Way" for The A.V. Club, saying that it "isn't as entirely ridiculous as it sounds, and the fact that it works even remotely is a testament to the actors and the script".

Charlie Jane Anders described Fontaine as a "less cool Guinan" in her criticism of "Badda-Bing Badda-Bang". The episode was included in her list of the worst holodeck-related episodes of the Star Trek franchise, but added that she was a fan of "It's Only a Paper Moon". That episode was ranked as the third best of the series by Gem Wheeler for Den of Geek, who called Fontaine the "ideal holographic host" on the show. The character was named the sixth best thing about Deep Space Nine in a list of highlights by TrekToday in 2015.

In 2020, ScreenRant ranked Vic Fontaine as the best holodeck character of the Star Trek franchise.
