= His Way (disambiguation) =

His Way could refer to:

- His Way (film) - 2011 documentary film about Jerry Weintraub
- "His Way" (Star Trek: Deep Space Nine), episode of Star Trek: Deep Space Nine
- His Way, a biography of Frank Sinatra by Kitty Kelley
- His Way: The Very Best of Frank Sinatra, 4 CD Collection

== See also ==
- His Way, Our Way - a Frank Sinatra tribute album
