= It's Only a Paper Moon =

1933 popular song

1933 recording by Paul Whiteman on Victor featuring Bunny Berigan on trumpet and Peggy Healy on vocals

"It's Only a Paper Moon" is a popular song published in 1933 with music by Harold Arlen and lyrics by Yip Harburg and Billy Rose.

== Background ==
It was originally titled "If You Believed in Me", but later went by the more popular title "It's Only a Paper Moon". The song was written for an unsuccessful 1932 Broadway play called The Great Magoo that was set in Coney Island. Claire Carleton first performed this song on December 2, 1932. It was used in the movie Take a Chance in 1933 when it was sung by June Knight and Charles "Buddy" Rogers. Paul Whiteman recorded a hit version later that year, released on the Victor label in October 1933 featuring Bunny Berigan on trumpet and Peggy Healy on vocals. A version released a month before Whiteman's was by Henry King and His Pierre Hotel Orchestra on the Vocalion label. Another popular 1933 recording was done by Cliff Edwards.

The song's lasting fame stems from its revival by popular artists during the last years of World War II, with hit recordings being made by Nat King Cole, Ella Fitzgerald, and Benny Goodman (vocal by Dottie Reid). It is now regarded as a jazz and pop standard, and has been recorded by numerous artists over the years.

Blanche DuBois is heard singing the song when in the bathroom in Scene Seven of Tennessee Williams's play A Streetcar Named Desire.

== Notable recordings ==
- Chet Baker
- Art Blakey
- Dion and the Belmonts
- Nat King Cole
- Nat King Cole Trio
- Natalie Cole – Unforgettable... with Love (1991)
- Perry Como
- Bing Crosby and Rosemary Clooney recorded the song for Crosby's radio show and it was heard on the March 26, 1953 broadcast and released on the album Bing & Rosie - The Crosby-Clooney Radio Sessions (2010).
- Miles Davis
- Sammy Davis Jr. – The Nat King Cole Songbook (1965)
- Kenny Drew Trio
- Cliff Edwards
- Ella Fitzgerald with The Delta Rhythm Boys – recorded 27 March 1945 for Decca
- Benny Goodman (feat. Dottie Reid)
- Stephane Grappelli
- Lionel Hampton
- Chiemi Eri
- Paul McCartney – Kisses on the Bottom (2012)
- Harry Nilsson – A Touch More Schmilsson in the Night (1988)
- Oscar Peterson
- James Taylor – A League of Their Own: Music from the Motion Picture (1992), American Standard (2020)
- John Pizzarelli – Dear Mr. Cole (1994)
- Django Reinhardt
- George Shearing – Paper Moon: Songs of Nat King Cole (1995)
- Frank Sinatra – Sing And Dance With Frank Sinatra (1950) and Sinatra's Swingin' Session!!! (1961)
- Mel Tormé – Mel Tormé at the Crescendo (1957)
- Paul Whiteman Orchestra
- Lee Wiley
- Bobby Darin
- Lena Zavaroni
- James Darren sang the song in character as Vic Fontaine in the Star Trek: Deep Space Nine episode of the same name.
- beabadoobee for the soundtrack to The New Look

== In popular culture ==
- The song features in A Streetcar Named Desire by Tennessee Williams. It is sung by Blanche DuBois while she bathes.*
- The song features in the 1973 film Paper Moon.
- A 1933 recording of the song was the theme song for the 1974 ABC situation comedy Paper Moon.
- A re-arrangement of the song done by Herbie Hancock is included in the 1986 movie Round Midnight (starring saxophonist Dexter Gordon), and the accompanying soundtrack album The Other Side of Round Midnight.
- The Cliff Edwards recording of this song is featured in the 2012 film Killing Them Softly.
- A season seven episode of Star Trek: Deep Space Nine borrows the song's title, and also features James Darren performing a rendition of the song in character as the holographic lounge singer Vic Fontaine.
- Ella Fitzgerald's cover of the song is featured in the 2010 video game Bioshock 2, but not on the official soundtrack. In the 2016 remaster, the song is replaced with Patti Page's "(How Much Is) That Doggie in the Window?".
- The song is sung and the lyrics feature in Haruki Murakami's 2009 novel, 1Q84, where it relates to the fictional love story in a parallel world with two moons.

== See also ==
- List of 1930s jazz standards
