= His Way (Star Trek: Deep Space Nine) =

- Star Trek: Deep Space Nine episode
- Episode no.: Season 6 Episode 20
- Directed by: Allan Kroeker
- Written by: Ira Steven Behr; Hans Beimler
- Production code: 544
- Original air date: April 20, 1998

Guest appearances
- James Darren as Vic Fontaine; Debi A. Monahan as Melissa; Cyndi Pass as Ginger; Mark Allen Shepherd as Morn

Episode chronology
← Previous "In the Pale Moonlight"	Next → "The Reckoning"
- Star Trek: Deep Space Nine season 6

"His Way" is the 144th episode of the television series Star Trek: Deep Space Nine, the 20th episode of the sixth season. It originally aired on April 20, 1998, on syndicated television, and received Nielsen ratings of 4.3 points, corresponding to about 4.2 million viewers.

Set in the 24th century, the series follows the adventures of the crew of the space station Deep Space Nine near the planet Bajor; this episode employs the holosuite, a fictional technology that uses holograms to create simulated immersive environments and characters. The episode introduces the character Vic Fontaine, a holographic lounge singer played by James Darren, and sees the beginning of the romantic relationship between main characters Kira Nerys and Odo.

The episode was directed by Allan Kroeker, who said this was the "gem" of the episodes he directed on the series.

== Plot ==
The Deep Space Nine crew enjoys a new holosuite program featuring a 1960s Las Vegas lounge singer named Vic Fontaine, who has been programmed with awareness that he is a hologram. Vic displays keen insights into the crew's relationships; he begins to comment on the relationship between Odo and Kira, but stops himself. While Kira travels to Bajor to meet with her ex-lover Shakaar Edon, Odo visits Vic to inquire further.

Vic observes that Odo clearly is in love with Kira, but is afraid to pursue her, whereas Kira likes him but considers him only a friend. Vic claims that Odo's biggest obstacle is his reserved, aloof personality, and suggests he needs to "have some fun". He has Odo perform on piano during one of Vic's shows, and then arranges a double date with a pair of holographic women. Odo begins to feel more relaxed in his day-to-day life. Later, Vic arranges an encounter with "Lola", a holographic singer made to look like Kira, but Odo is dissatisfied at her lack of Kira's personality, and knowing that he is only comfortable with her because he knows she's a hologram, becomes frustrated and leaves.

Vic, determined to take matters into his own hands, invites Kira to dinner, supposedly on Odo's behalf. Vic then persuades Odo to come to the holosuite to see a "new and improved" Kira hologram. Odo and Kira share a romantic date and a dance at Vic's club, but when Vic reveals to Odo that his date is with the real Kira, not a hologram, Odo leaves, angered and embarrassed.

The next day, Kira confronts Odo, insisting they need to discuss what happened over dinner, "anywhere but a holosuite". Odo asks whether Shakaar would object to that, believing she is still seeing him, but Kira tells him her trip was strictly business, and that she isn't romantically involved with anyone. Odo sarcastically asks, if they have dinner, whether she would also like a dance afterward, and a kiss; Kira heatedly responds that she might. Odo declares "Well, then, who needs dinner? Why don't I just get it over with and kiss you right now?" Kira replies, "Well, why don't you?" and Odo grabs her and they kiss passionately. Later, Odo stops by the Holodeck to thank Vic for his help.

== Production and casting ==
Executive producer Ira Steven Behr had been intending since the fourth season of Deep Space Nine to introduce the character of a lounge singer who provided romantic advice to the main characters; the role had been offered to Frank Sinatra, Jr. and Steve Lawrence for potential scenes in the fourth and fifth seasons, but they had declined. In the sixth season, Behr decided that an entire 1960s-era Las Vegas–themed episode should be created, resulting in the production of this episode.

For this episode, the role of Vic Fontaine was offered to Robert Goulet, Tom Jones, and Jerry Vale before being accepted by James Darren. Musicians cast in the episode included actual musicians, including Pete Christleib (tenor saxophone) and Luther Hughes (bass). Jay Chattaway, who wrote the music for the episode, worked to have actual musicians on the set.

== Music ==
Several pop standards are performed in Vic's lounge in this episode, including "You're Nobody till Somebody Loves You", "Come Fly With Me", "Fever", and "I've Got You Under My Skin". "Fever" is sung by Nana Visitor as the holographic character "Lola"; Visitor chose the song and performed it in an emulation of the style of Doris Duke. In addition, Odo (Rene Auberjonois) and Captain Sisko (Avery Brooks) sing a verse of "They Can't Take That Away from Me".

== Reception ==
Zack Handlen, reviewing the episode in 2014 for The A.V. Club, praised the performances of the cast, especially Nana Visitor as Kira, and thought the episode was "charming and sweet" though superficial, but found the romance story "forced" and a "one-sided fantasy" in focusing only on Odo's feelings rather than Kira's. Writing for Tor.com, also in 2014, Keith R.A. DeCandido gave the episode a rating of 6 out of 10; he wrote that he enjoyed the episode despite intellectually disliking both the character of Vic Fontaine and the Odo/Kira romance.

In 2016, The Hollywood Reporter ranked this as the 93rd best episode of all Star Trek. In 2019, CBR ranked this the 20th best Holodeck-themed episode of all Star Trek franchise episodes up to that time.

In 2018, SyFy recommend this episode for its abbreviated watch guide focusing on Kira, and in 2019, Tor.com noted this as an "essential" episode for the character of Odo, describing it as the best episode featuring Odo and Kira's love story arc.
