= The Nagus =

- Star Trek: Deep Space Nine episode
- Episode no.: Season 1 Episode 11
- Directed by: David Livingston
- Story by: David Livingston
- Teleplay by: Ira Steven Behr
- Production code: 411
- Original air date: March 21, 1993

Guest appearances
- Max Grodénchik as Rom; Aron Eisenberg as Nog; Wallace Shawn as Grand Nagus Zek; Tiny Ron as Maihar'du; Lee Arenberg as Gral; Lou Wagner as Krax; Barry Gordon as Nava

Episode chronology
← Previous "Move Along Home"	Next → "Vortex"
- Star Trek: Deep Space Nine season 1

"The Nagus" is the 11th episode of the American science fiction television series Star Trek: Deep Space Nine.

Set in the 24th century, the series follows the adventures on Deep Space Nine, a space station located adjacent to a stable wormhole between the Alpha and Gamma quadrants of the Milky Way Galaxy, near the planet Bajor. This is the first of several episodes in the series focusing on the politics of the Ferengi, an alien race distinguished by their emphasis on earning profit as the highest goal. In this episode, Grand Nagus Zek, the leader of the Ferengi people, names Deep Space Nine's bartender Quark as his successor; meanwhile Benjamin Sisko, the human station commander, frets over his son Jake's friendship with Quark's nephew Nog, a known troublemaker.

== Plot ==
Zek, the Grand Nagus of the Ferengi Alliance, arrives at Deep Space Nine and seems to take an interest in Quark. He tells Quark that he wants to use Quark's bar for a conference, where he announces that Quark will be his successor. The Nagus then dies, apparently making Quark's appointment permanent.

Quark has a hard time adjusting to his new position, but he becomes popular among the Ferengi entrepreneurs by giving away lucrative business opportunities. Zek's son Krax and Quark's brother Rom attempt to kill Quark and are stopped by Zek, who appears before them still very much alive. Quark's appointment was a test to see how his son would respond in his absence, and as Zek says, "You failed! Miserably!" Quark congratulates Rom for having the "lobes" to try to kill him.

Meanwhile, Commander Sisko is trying to cope with the friendship between his son Jake and Rom's son Nog. His problem is seemingly solved when Rom orders Nog not to attend school; however, Jake and Nog begin spending even more time together. Jake will only tell Sisko that what they are doing is "private." In the end, Sisko finds he has nothing to worry about when he finds Jake teaching Nog how to read.

== Production ==
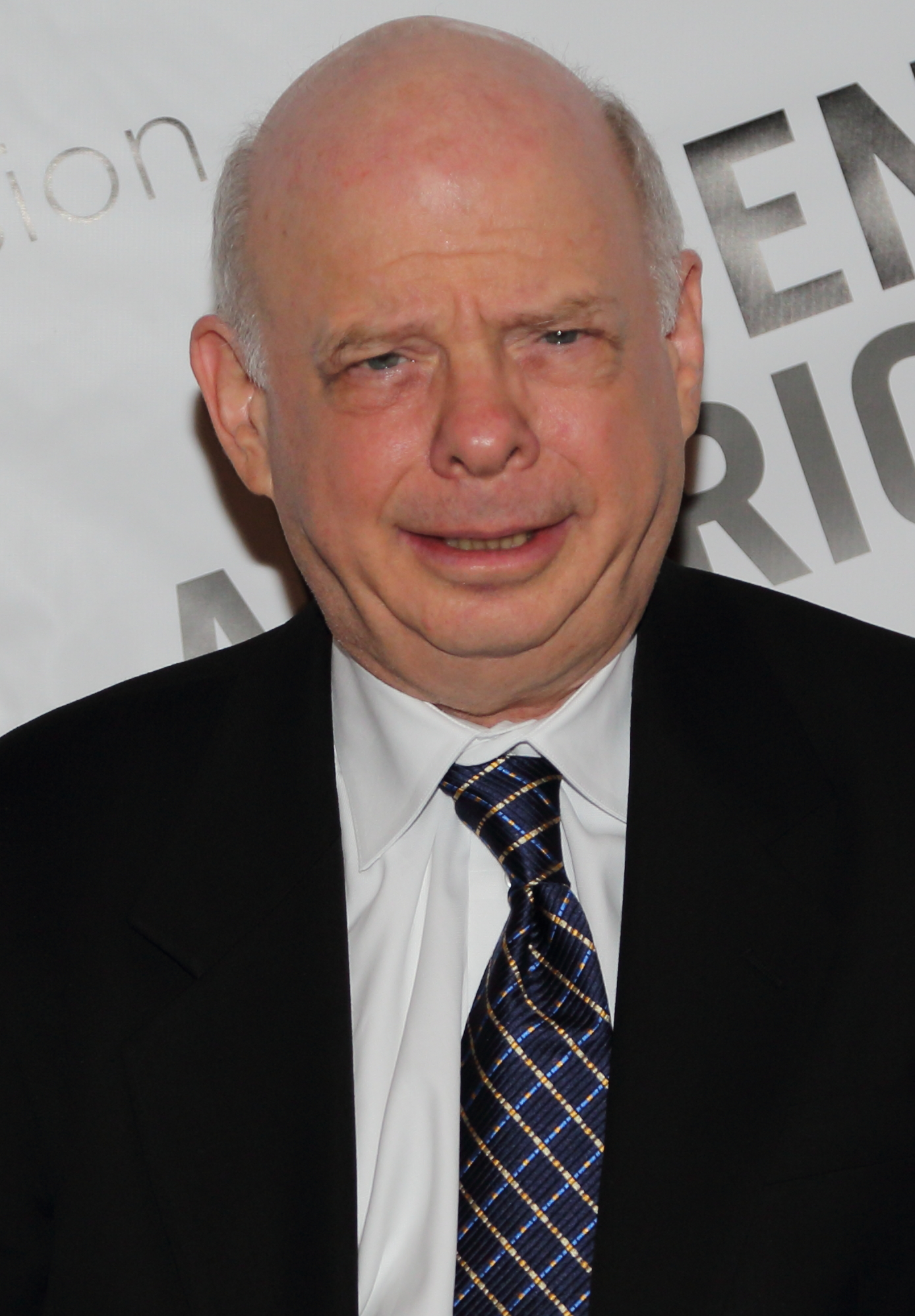
This episodes introduces Wallace Shawn as the Ferengi leader Grand Nagus Zek. It is the first of seven appearances of the character.

The initial story concept came from director David Livingston, who pitched the idea of Quark as a businessman and a secondary story about Jake teaching Nog to read. The writers had difficulty developing the business part of the story and Michael Piller suggested: "Well, let's do The Godfather"; the idea stuck and Ira Behr wrote the teleplay. Livingston was thrilled by the final script, and acknowledged that the name Zek was his only contribution to the main Godfather-inspired storyline. The idea for the "Rules of Acquisition" came from Behr.

The episode includes a very deliberate homage shot to The Godfather. Shortly after Quark is "made" Grand Nagus, the shot of the following scene is a near-exact duplicate of the opening of the movie, with a client coming to seek a favor. Quark is even reclining in a chair as did Marlon Brando as Don Vito Corleone, and petting an alien creature the way the Don held his cat. In his following line as well, he paraphrased Brando: "And now you call me [Nagus]…".

Casting director Ron Surma found out that Wallace Shawn was interested in doing an episode of Star Trek and writer Ira Behr said: "Let's find something that could possibly recur, and if he likes it…".

Shawn described the makeup process as "a little bit disturbing and uncomfortable and exhausting". It took three hours to put on the makeup, and an hour to take it off, and he would be wearing it for at least twelve hours. Although the process was arduous, and he would not have wanted to do it more than once a year, he appreciated the results. "To be in that world and to be in that makeup really liberated me in a way that I never experienced before — or since. I felt completely free, so it was a joyful experience." An unnamed executive visited the set and criticized Shawn's performance, telling him: "You do understand, this is a serious program? Star Trek is not a comedy." Shawn was not an expert on the show, never having owned a TV, and mentioned the conversation to director David Livingston, who reassured Shawn that he loved what he was doing and to keep doing it.

== Reception ==
Zach Handlen of The A.V. Club, bemoaned the fact that in his opinion the Ferengi are "essentially a horrible cultural stereotype and that it provides a very limited platform on which to base a story". He called it a clever story about the limits of power, praised the casting of Shawn and the character work of Shimerman. "Without Shimerman, this would've been intolerable. With him, it’s surprisingly not bad. It's still not good, though." Handlen said the subplot with Jake and Nog was the most successful part of the story. "It's a simple story, and effectively finds the best out of two characters we've been given reason to doubt." Keith DeCandido of Tor.com rated the episode six out of ten, and called it "a delightful little episode that sets the tone for future Ferengi tales". He praised the casting of Wallace Shawn, Shimerman's performance, the hilarious Godfather riff, but concluded that it is the B-story with Jake and Nog that gives the episode its heart.

In 2018, CBR ranked Grand Nagus Zek, the character introduced in this episode, as the 14th best recurring character of all Star Trek.
