= Nog (Star Trek) =

Fictional character from Star Trek: Deep Space Nine

- Star Trek character
- Nog in the episode What You Leave Behind
- First appearance: "Emissary"; Star Trek: Deep Space Nine; January 3, 1993
- Last appearance: "What You Leave Behind"; Star Trek: Deep Space Nine; June 2, 1999
- Portrayed by: Aron Eisenberg

In-universe information
- Species: Ferengi
- Affiliation: Ferengi Alliance; United Federation of Planets; Starfleet
- Posting: Deep Space Nine; USS Defiant
- Position: Operations Officer (Seasons 6-7); Starfleet Cadet (Seasons 4-6); Bar Employee (Seasons 1-4)
- Rank: Lieutenant, Junior Grade (Season 7); Ensign (Seasons 6-7); Cadet (Seasons 4-6); Civilian (Seasons 1-4)

Nog, played by Aron Eisenberg, is a recurring character on the science fiction television series Star Trek: Deep Space Nine (DS9). A member of the profit-driven alien species known as the Ferengi, he becomes the first Ferengi to join Starfleet, where he excels as first a cadet, and then an officer. He is the nephew of the Ferengi bartender Quark, a major character on the series; the son of Quark's brother Rom; and a close friend of Jake Sisko, the son of Deep Space Nine's protagonist Benjamin Sisko. Episodes of the series often paired Nog with Jake.

Nog is the main character in the episode "It's Only a Paper Moon", which was noted for exploring his recovery from post-traumatic stress disorder.

== Fictional character biography ==
In the Star Trek universe, Nog was born to Rom and Prinadora on Ferenginar in 2353. Later, he moved with his father to Deep Space Nine and worked at his uncle Quark's bar. This time is depicted in DS9, and Nog is characterized as being very mischievous and a slight delinquent. Throughout the course of the series, Nog befriends Jake Sisko. In the first seasons of DS9 he is, though reluctantly, one of the first students in Keiko O'Brien's school. When Rom, under pressure from Quark and Grand Nagus Zek, pulls Nog out of school, Jake tutors him without Rom's knowledge ("The Nagus").

Recognizing his father's failure to capitalize on his proficiency in mechanics and electronics, and not wanting to follow in those footsteps, Nog resolves to go into a career where he can make something of himself. He requests a recommendation from Commander Benjamin Sisko to be admitted to Starfleet Academy ("Heart of Stone"). Although Sisko takes considerable convincing that this young Ferengi is serious in this uncharacteristically unprofitable ambition for his species, Nog is admitted with his recommendation and becomes the first Ferengi in Starfleet ("Facets").

Starfleet assigns Nog to Deep Space Nine as part of his cadet field training ("The Ascent"). Upon returning to the station, he and Jake become roommates. As a cadet, Nog works mainly under chief of operations Miles O'Brien. Nog receives a commission as ensign shortly before Starfleet retakes Deep Space Nine during the Dominion War ("Favor the Bold").

In the height of the Dominion War, Nog loses his leg due to a battle injury ("The Siege of AR-558"). Although a biosynthetic leg is grown for him to replace the amputated one, after months of therapy Nog still feels phantom pain in his new leg. Nog chooses a holosuite simulation of a Las Vegas nightclub as the place to recuperate from his trauma and adjust to using an artificial limb, living in the holosuite until the simulated nightclub singer Vic Fontaine forces him to leave ("It's Only a Paper Moon").

One of Sisko's final acts before joining the Prophets is to promote Nog to the rank of lieutenant junior grade (DS9: "What You Leave Behind").

In the 32nd century, Starfleet has named a starship after Nog. The USS Nog (an Eisenberg-class starship, named after actor Aron Eisenberg, who played Nog and had recently died) is stationed at Federation headquarters. (Star Trek: Discovery: "Die Trying")

== Appearances ==
Nog appears in the following episodes of Star Trek: Deep Space Nine:

Season 1

- Emissary
- A Man Alone
- The Nagus
- The Storyteller
- Progress

Season 2

- The Siege
- Sanctuary
- The Jem'Hadar

Season 3

- Life Support
- Heart of Stone
- Facets

Season 4

- The Visitor (alternate timeline version)
- Little Green Men
- Homefront
- Paradise Lost
- Shattered Mirror (Mirror Universe counterpart)

Season 5

- The Ascent
- The Darkness and the Light
- For the Uniform
- Soldiers of the Empire
- Blaze of Glory
- Empok Nor
- In the Cards
- Call to Arms

Season 6

- A Time to Stand
- Rocks and Shoals
- Behind the Lines
- Favor the Bold
- Sacrifice of Angels
- You Are Cordially Invited...
- The Magnificent Ferengi
- Far Beyond the Stars
- One Little Ship
- Valiant
- Profit and Lace
- Tears of the Prophets

Season 7

- Image in the Sand
- Take Me Out to the Holosuite
- Chrysalis
- Treachery, Faith, and the Great River
- The Siege of AR-558
- It's Only a Paper Moon
- Badda-bing, Badda-bang
- 'Til Death Do Us Part
- The Changing Face of Evil
- When it Rains...
- The Dogs of War
- What You Leave Behind

== Top episodes ==
The episode "It's Only a Paper Moon", focuses on Nog's recovery from the trauma of having lost his leg in the episode "The Siege of AR-558". These two episodes were ranked as the 14th and 15th best of Star Trek: Deep Space Nine by The Hollywood Reporter in 2016. Hollywood Reporter ranked "It's Only a Paper Moon" as the 56th best of all episodes of the Star Trek franchise aired by 2016, calling it a touching and ambitious story. The A.V. Club's Zack Handlen lauded Aron Eisenberg's acting in this episode, noting that his portrayal of Nog's PTSD "has some real edges to it, and some aspects of it should be familiar to anyone who's suffered a period of severe depression".

Stephanie Marceau, writing for Screen Rant, ranked the top ten episodes featuring Nog:

1. It's Only A Paper Moon
2. Heart of Stone
3. The Magnificent Ferengi
4. The Jem'Hadar
5. Treachery, Faith, and the Great River
6. Badda-Bing Badda-Bang
7. The Visitor
8. Progress
9. Valiant
10. Empok Nor

Marceau says of "Its Only a Paper Moon" that "Watching Nog deal with his conflicted feelings and trauma about the war and Starfleet was powerful and inspiring" and found the show's treatment of the character's loss "respectful". Clint Worthington, writing for SyFy, felt "Heart of Stone", in which Nog decides to join Starfleet, was the most important Nog episode; he also noted "The Siege of AR-558", in which Nog is confronted with the hardships of war.

In 2024, Joshua M. Patton, writing for CBR, called Nog "Deep Space Nine's Greatest Character," citing his larger story arc. Patton notes Nog was the only junior character to join Starfleet and serves the "recurring theme in Star Trek...that former enemies become allies." Also an Army veteran who served in Iraq, Patton notes that Nog's story in "It's Only a Paper Moon" is a unique allegory about mental injury and trauma following war because instead of painting him as broken "Nog's journey highlights for any trauma survivor that they have a future." In the documentary What We Left Behind, Eisenberg became emotional when talking about hearing from veterans who felt seen by the episode.

== Reception ==
In 2016, the character of Nog was ranked as the 51st most important character of Starfleet within the Star Trek science fiction universe by Wired Magazine.

Richard A. Hall observed that not the least through the influence of his Starfleet neighbours, Nog becomes a more thoughtful and caring individual over the course of the show's run.

Discovery co-creator and co-showrunner Alex Kurtzman saw in Nog "a character who exemplified the possibility of resilience after a period of darkness". Malissa Longo, widow of the portrayer Aron Eisenberg, commented: "Nog was a trailblazer in DS9. I have no doubt that he would have left a lasting impression on the Federation".

In 2019, Clint Worthington writing for SyFy, said that Nog was "one of Star Trek's most aspirational characters" noting how the character progressed throughout the show. They point in the early seasons he "dragged Jake into one misadventure or another", a cackling sidekick for Jake, but then in "Heart of Stone" he has realization he does not like where his life is headed. With the help of Commander Sisko, he sets his dreams on Starfleet hoping to rise above the limited opportunities available to him.

CNN remembered Nog as the major role for actor Eisenberg in his career when he died in 2019.
