= Covenant (Star Trek: Deep Space Nine) =

- Star Trek: Deep Space Nine episode
- Episode no.: Season 7 Episode 9
- Directed by: John Kretchmer
- Written by: René Echevarria
- Production code: 559
- Original air date: November 23, 1998

Guest appearances
- Jason Leland Adams as Benyan; Marc Alaimo as Gul Dukat; Maureen Flannigan as Mika; Miriam Flynn as Midwife; Norman Parker as Vedek Fala; Mark Piatelli as Brin

Episode chronology
← Previous "The Siege of AR-558"	Next → "It's Only a Paper Moon"
- Star Trek: Deep Space Nine season 7

"Covenant" is the 159th episode of the television series Star Trek: Deep Space Nine, the ninth episode of the seventh season. This episode first aired the week of November 23, 1998.

Set in the 24th century, the series follows the adventures of the crew of the space station Deep Space Nine near the planet Bajor, as the Bajorans recover from a decades-long occupation by the imperialistic Cardassians. The station is adjacent to a wormhole that is home to powerful alien beings worshiped by the Bajorans as the "Prophets". In this episode, the Bajoran Colonel Kira Nerys contends with a cult led by Gul Dukat, the Cardassian former prefect of the occupation of Bajor, worshipping the Pah-wraiths, evil counterparts of the Prophets.

== Plot ==
Kira is visited by Fala, a Bajoran cleric who taught her when she was a child. He gives her a gift that turns out to be a transponder that beams her to Empok Nor, a formerly abandoned Cardassian space station.

Empok Nor is now inhabited by 50 Bajorans who believe that the Pah-wraiths are the true Prophets of Bajor; the leader of their cult is none other than Dukat. The Bajorans' faith in Dukat is so strong that when Kira threatens to kill Dukat with a phaser, many of them place themselves in Kira's line of fire.

Fala introduces Kira to cult members Mika and her husband Benyan. Mika is pregnant, and the station's populace eagerly awaits the first child to be born into the cult. When the baby turns out to be half-Cardassian, Dukat improvises a speech in which he calls the baby a "miracle" from the Pah-wraiths, a sign approving their faith in Dukat. Kira is immediately certain that Dukat is in fact the child's biological father, and plants a seed of doubt with Benyan by asking him if Mika and Dukat had spent time alone together.

Mika tells Dukat she is not sure she can lie to Benyan about the child's true parentage. Dukat opens an airlock, attempting to blow Mika out into space; but Mika survives, and the doctor reports that she is likely to recover from her injuries. Dukat calls the incident an "accident", but in private, he prays to the Pah-wraiths, concerned that his followers will discover what he has done.

Dukat decides to have the Bajoran believers commit mass suicide, using pills that will reduce the body to dust. Kira is locked in her quarters, but escapes just in time to reach the suicide ceremony. She knocks Dukat's pill out of his hand and onto the floor with other pills. Dukat scrambles to find his pill amongst the others; Kira accuses him of using a placebo, having no intention of dying himself. With this revelation, the Bajorans turn against him. Dukat beams out, and Fala takes a pill and swallows it, explaining his decision with the word "faith".

The starship Defiant arrives and takes Kira and the cultists back to Deep Space Nine. Kira ponders the meaning of Fala's last words and acknowledges that Dukat may truly believe in what he was doing, making him more dangerous than ever.

== Production ==
Writer Rene Echevarria did not think the episode did enough to develop the Bajoran characters, to show the cult members point of view and what they were getting out of the experience. Echevarria said that originally Dukat was not sincere in his belief in the Pah-wraith but this changed during the writing process:

a part of him is sincere. On the other level, of course, there is some dark need of his to continue to punish these people. I hope that that decision to make him sincere really pays off. On some level he is."

== Reception ==
Cinefantastique magazine rated it 2.5 out of 5. Tor.com gave it 7 out of 10.

In 2015, Geek.com recommended this episode as "essential watching" for their abbreviated Star Trek: Deep Space Nine binge-watching guide, noting "Dukat has gone full-crazy".

In 2018, SyFy recommend this episode for its abbreviated watch guide for the Bajoran character Kira Nerys.

Political science scholar George A. Gonzales described this episode's portrayal of the Pah-wraith cult as "perhaps the most disturbing manifestation of religion" in the Star Trek franchise.
