= Treachery, Faith, and the Great River =

- Star Trek: Deep Space Nine episode
- Episode no.: Season 7 Episode 6
- Directed by: Steve Posey
- Story by: Philip Kim
- Teleplay by: David Weddle; Bradley Thompson
- Production code: 556
- Original air date: November 2, 1998

Guest appearances
- Jeffrey Combs as Weyoun; Casey Biggs as Damar; J. G. Hertzler as General Martok; Aron Eisenberg as Nog; Max Grodénchik as Rom; Salome Jens as Female Changeling

Episode chronology
← Previous "Chrysalis"	Next → "Once More unto the Breach"
- Star Trek: Deep Space Nine season 7

"Treachery, Faith, and the Great River" (originally without a serial comma) is the 156th episode of the television series Star Trek: Deep Space Nine, the sixth episode of the seventh season. It was first aired the week of November 2, 1998. The teleplay was written by David Weddle and Bradley Thompson, based on a story by Philip Kim, and directed by Steve Posey. When it was aired on television in November 1998, the episode received Nielsen ratings of 4.8 points corresponding to over 4.7 million viewers.

Set in the 24th century, the series follows the adventures of the crew of the Starfleet-managed Bajoran space station Deep Space Nine. The later seasons of the series follow a war between the United Federation of Planets and an expansionist empire known as the Dominion, ruled by the shape-shifting Changelings, which has already absorbed the nearby planet of Cardassia. In this episode, a clone of Weyoun, one of the Dominion's genetically engineered Vorta administrators, attempts to defect to the Federation; since the Vorta see the Changelings as gods, Weyoun delivers himself into the custody of DS9's security chief Odo, a renegade Changeling who has rejected the Dominion.

Guest stars include many of Deep Space Nine's recurring cast, including Jeffrey Combs as two clones of Weyoun, Casey Biggs as Cardassian leader Damar, J. G. Hertzler as Klingon General Martok, Aron Eisenberg and Max Grodénchik as Ferengi engineers Nog and Rom, and Salome Jens as a Changeling.

== Plot ==
Odo is summoned to a secret rendezvous by Weyoun, who says that he has decided that the Dominion's war against the Federation is misguided, and offers to defect. Odo distrusts Weyoun, and is irritated that Weyoun considers him a god, but takes him into custody. Soon their runabout is hailed by another Weyoun, who explains that the Weyoun clone with Odo (Weyoun VI) was activated after the "accidental" death of the previous Weyoun (which both Weyouns suspect was arranged by Damar); his successor, Weyoun VII, was activated when Weyoun VI abandoned his post and was deemed "defective". Weyoun VII orders Weyoun VI to activate his self-termination implant, but he refuses.

Damar persuades Weyoun VII to order the runabout destroyed to prevent Weyoun VI from reaching the Federation; Weyoun VII is reluctant to risk the death of Odo, a Changeling, but eventually consents. When the Changeling supervising him demands an update, Weyoun VII is subservient but vague in his answers, not revealing Odo as their target. Damar notices that the Changeling looks unwell.

As they try to escape the pursuing Dominion ships, Weyoun VI reveals to Odo that an unknown and fatal illness is spreading among the Changelings, with Odo possibly the only one uninfected. He urges Odo to be prepared to take command of the Dominion himself and turn it away from its imperialistic ways. Realizing they will be unable to escape, Weyoun VI tells Odo he lives to serve him, hails Weyoun VII, and triggers his termination implant. Weyoun VII immediately calls off the attack and allows Odo to escape. Before dying, Weyoun VI asks Odo for a blessing, and Odo complies. Back on DS9, Kira and Odo discuss their concern the Dominion may become more aggressive if its dying leaders decide they have nothing left to lose.

In a side plot on Deep Space Nine, Chief Miles O'Brien is missing a crucial piece of equipment needed to repair the starship Defiant. Nog offers to help O'Brien by navigating "the Great Material Continuum"—a Ferengi metaphor for the economics of supply and demand as a great river on which a skilled navigator can always find what he needs. O'Brien reluctantly authorizes Nog to make a long series of trades, including loaning out Captain Sisko's desk and selling a shipment of wine sent by General Martok's wife. An increasingly alarmed O'Brien watches with dismay as Nog works deal after deal while the required part appears no closer to arriving. In the end, the Defiant is finally repaired, Martok's wine is replaced with a better vintage, and Sisko's desk is returned before he even discovers it was gone.

== Reception ==
In his 2014 review of this episode for The A.V. Club, Zack Handlen felt the episode was "a pleasure to watch" and praised its presentation of both sides of a conflict.

Reviewing the episode in 2014 for Tor.com, Keith R.A. DeCandido gave it a rating of 7 out of 10; he called the plots "superb" and a "delight", though he thought Nog's storyline makes little sense in a science-fiction setting in which items can easily be replicated.

In 2015, Geek.com recommended this episode as "essential watching" for their abbreviated Star Trek: Deep Space Nine binge-watching guide.

In 2019, Screen Rant ranked this one of the top ten episodes for the character Nog.

Media scholar Ina Rae Hark described the episode as "a sort of comparative religion seminar" examining the beliefs of the Dominion and the Ferengi. The episode therefore illustrates how Deep Space Nine explores alien cultures in detail, taking religious belief seriously, and thus departs from the work of Gene Roddenberry, creator of the Star Trek franchise, who tended to portray religion as an exploitative "con game".
