= The Siege of AR-558 =

- Star Trek: Deep Space Nine episode
- Episode no.: Season 7 Episode 8
- Directed by: Winrich Kolbe
- Written by: Ira Steven Behr, Hans Beimler
- Production code: 558
- Original air date: November 16, 1998

Guest appearances
- Raymond Cruz as Vargas; James Darren as Vic Fontaine; Aron Eisenberg as Nog; Max Grodénchik as Rom; Annette Helde as Larkin; Patrick Kilpatrick as Reese; Bill Mumy as Kellin

Episode chronology
← Previous "Once More Unto the Breach"	Next → "Covenant"
- Star Trek: Deep Space Nine season 7

"The Siege of AR-558" is the 158th episode of the television series Star Trek: Deep Space Nine, the eighth episode of the seventh season, first aired the week of November 16, 1998. It was written by Ira Steven Behr and Hans Beimler, and directed by Winrich Kolbe.

Set in the 24th century, the series follows the adventures of the crew of the space station Deep Space Nine; the later seasons of the series follow a war between the United Federation of Planets and an empire known as the Dominion. This episode focuses on one battle in the Dominion War, in which Starfleet soldiers attempt to hold a communications installation captured from the Dominion.

This episode received a Nielsen rating of 4.5 when it was broadcast on television in 1998.

== Plot ==
The USS Defiant, commanded by Captain Benjamin Sisko, is dispatched to bring supplies to Starfleet soldiers on planet AR-558, the site of a captured Dominion communications relay. The Ferengi civilian bartender Quark accompanies them, having been sent on a "fact-finding mission" to the front lines.

Sisko, Quark, Dr. Julian Bashir, counselor Ezri Dax, and Quark's nephew Ensign Nog find the Starfleet garrison in bad shape: of 150 soldiers sent to the planet, only 43 still live; the captain and first officer have been killed, leaving Lt. Nadia Larkin in command. The remaining soldiers are badly in need of relief: they have not been rotated off-duty for over five months, although regulations insist that infantry be rested every 90 days. They are plagued by "Houdini" anti-personnel mines that pass in and out of subspace at random and kill soldiers unexpectedly. Although Nog looks up to the battle-hardened veterans as heroes, Quark warns him that humans deprived of their creature comforts can be brutal.

When the Dominion's soldiers, the Jem'Hadar, arrive to attempt to retake the installation, Sisko takes command of the garrison, ordering the Defiant away to safety. Over Quark's objections, Sisko sends Nog as part of a scouting party to assess the Jem'Hadar's strength. The party gains the needed intelligence but is ambushed; Larkin is killed, and Nog loses a leg. Quark accuses Sisko of not valuing Nog's life; Sisko retorts that he cares about all the soldiers under his command.

Dax assists the garrison's engineer, Kellin, in working out a way to make the "Houdinis" visible, so that they can be moved out of the camp and used to halt attacking Jem'Hadar. As the Jem'Hadar begin advancing, the Houdinis begin to explode in the distance. The Starfleet personnel prepare for the upcoming fight, while Quark waits with Nog in the infirmary. In the ensuing battle, the Jem'Hadar break through the Starfleet defensive lines; Quark shoots a Jem'Hadar soldier in the infirmary, protecting Nog. Although many Starfleet personnel are killed in the battle, they succeed in holding the installation.

In the aftermath of the battle, the Defiant returns, accompanied by the USS Veracruz, which evacuates the wounded and replaces them with fresh troops. Sisko reflects on the cost of the victory and the importance of remembering the dead as people, not just names on a list.

== Production ==
The number 558 is also the production code of the episode.

The script changed several times during pre-production, with minor edits being made.

"The Siege of AR-558" featured Bill Mumy in a guest role as Kellin; the actor had previously appeared in the science fiction genre television series Lost in Space and Babylon 5. He had previously passed on offers to appear in Deep Space Nine due to his appearances on the latter show. He was offered another role once the series was finished, but turned it down as it would have involved wearing prosthetics in order to appear as an alien – something he didn't want to do, as his appearances as his Babylon 5 character, Lennier, required him to wear them. But Deep Space Nine producer Ira Steven Behr offered him a human role in this episode, which Mumy accepted after reading the script for an hour. Once on set, he found that the script could not be changed at all, unwittingly delaying a morning's production because he added the word "well" to a line. He was happy with the death scene of his character, also adding that Behr "got a kick" out of killing Will Robinson from Lost in Space.

== Reception ==
In 2015, Geek.com recommended this episode as "essential watching" for their abbreviated Star Trek: Deep Space Nine binge-watching guide.

In 2016, The Hollywood Reporter ranked this episode the 15th best of Star Trek: Deep Space Nine.

In 2017, ScreenRant ranked this episode the 5th thematically darkest episode of the Star Trek franchise.

In 2018, Vulture rated "The Siege of AR-558" the 12th best episode of Star Trek: Deep Space Nine. In 2016, The Hollywood Reporter ranked "The Siege of AR-558" as the 15th best of Star Trek: Deep Space Nine. In 2014, Gizmodo ranked "The Siege of AR-558" as the 17th best episode of Star Trek, out of the over 700 made by that time.

In 2020, Den of Geek listed this episode as one of the best stories of Star Trek: Deep Space Nine.
