= The Jem'Hadar =

- Star Trek: Deep Space Nine episode
- Episode no.: Season 2 Episode 26
- Directed by: Kim Friedman
- Written by: Ira Steven Behr
- Cinematography by: Marvin Rush
- Production code: 446
- Original air date: June 13, 1994

Guest appearances
- Aron Eisenberg as Nog; Alan Oppenheimer as Keogh; Molly Hagan as Eris; Cress Williams as Talak'talan

Episode chronology
← Previous "Tribunal"	Next → "The Search"
- Star Trek: Deep Space Nine season 2

"The Jem'Hadar" is the 26th and final episode in the second season of the syndicated American science fiction television series Star Trek: Deep Space Nine, the 46th episode overall. It introduces the Jem'Hadar and the Vorta, two species of the Dominion. It is the last episode to regularly feature the 2360s communicator badge from Star Trek: The Next Generation.

Set in the 24th century, the series follows the adventures on Deep Space Nine, a space station located near a stable wormhole between the Alpha and Gamma quadrants of the Milky Way Galaxy. In this episode, the crew of Deep Space Nine meets a force more powerful than the Federation.

This episode originally aired on television on June 13, 1994.

== Plot ==
Commander Sisko and his son Jake are preparing for a father-son camping trip to a planet in the Gamma Quadrant. Sisko is disappointed when Jake invites his best friend Nog to join them, and even more dismayed when Nog's uncle Quark invites himself along as well. They depart as planned, but as they set up camp, Quark quickly becomes irritated by the environment and argues with Sisko, leading an embarrassed Nog to storm off into the woods with Jake chasing after him.

Sisko and Quark are startled when an alien woman comes running out of the forest, pursued by a troop of fierce soldiers, who take all three captive. Sisko, Quark, and the woman, Eris, are taken to a cave where they are imprisoned in a force field. Eris warns Sisko that the field is lethal, and that she is unable to use her telekinetic abilities to disable it due to the suppressive collar around her neck. She explains that the soldiers are Jem'Hadar, bred and put into service by the Dominion, who rule that section of the Gamma Quadrant, and that they cannot be escaped or defeated. Sisko points out that they have been imprisoned together and are not under close guard, believing that he can use their captors' apparent overconfidence to their advantage, and begins by attempting to remove Eris' collar.

Third Talak'talan, leader of the Jem'Hadar group, informs Sisko that the Dominion will no longer tolerate the presence of ships from the other side of the wormhole and reveals extensive knowledge of the Alpha Quadrant, but he refuses to allow Sisko to speak with the Founders, leaders of the Dominion, whom Eris then claims are a myth. After several hours, Sisko makes some progress on removing Eris' collar and enlists Quark to pick the lock.

Meanwhile, Jake and Nog, having returned to camp to find Sisko and Quark gone, locate the Jem'Hadar encampment. They return to the runabout but are unable to beam the captives off the planet or bypass the ship's autopilot to break orbit in order to get help. When they finally gain control of the ship, they realize that without the autopilot, they will have to learn to pilot it themselves.

Back on DS9, a ship arrives unexpectedly through the wormhole, and Talak'talan suddenly materializes in Ops, despite the station's shields being raised. He informs the crew that Sisko is being detained by the Dominion, then transports away before he can be caught, walking unaffected through a security forcefield. Captain Keogh, in command of the Galaxy-class starship U.S.S. Odyssey arrives at the station to assess the situation and mount a rescue mission. He allows the station's two remaining runabouts, crewed by Major Kira, O'Brien, Dax, Odo, and Dr. Bashir, to accompany the Odyssey on its mission.

Quark manages to remove Eris' collar, allowing her to disengage the force field, and the three escape. Meanwhile, the Federation ships come under attack, with the Odyssey sustaining heavy damage, as the Jem'Hadar weapons are able to bypass its shields. O'Brien beams aboard Jake and Nog's runabout and takes control, then beams aboard Sisko, Quark, and Eris. As the group begins to retreat to the Alpha Quadrant, one of the Jem'Hadar ships makes a suicide run at the Odyssey, colliding with it and destroying it almost instantly. Back at the station, Quark discovers Eris' collar is a fake, and they deduce that she is a spy for the Dominion, which she admits before transporting away — leaving the crew with the realization that their dealings with this powerful new opponent have only begun.

== Reception ==
TrekNation said they "thoroughly enjoyed the episode" even though they were not sure it was a "good episode"; they felt many characters were developed and called it a "satisfying season ender" without being a cliffhanger. IGN said this one of the two best episodes in Season 2 of DS9, and noted how it introduced the Dominion saga that would dominate later seasons.

In 2018, Comic Book Resources rated "The Jem'Hadar" episode paired with its sequel "The Search" as the 14th best multi episode story of Star Trek.

In 2015, Geek.com recommended this episode as "essential watching" for their abbreviated Star Trek: Deep Space Nine binge-watching guide.

In 2019, Screen Rant ranked this the fourth best episode for the character Nog, noting how Nog was able to work together with Jake.

In 2020, Io9 said this was one of the "must watch" episodes from the series.

In 2021, Nerdist said this was one of the top ten Star Trek episodes with first alien contact, introducing the combative Jem'Hadar, as well as the Vorta in one episode, as the Federation has its first brush with the Dominion.

== Releases ==
This episode along with "Tribunal" was released on one VHS cassette, Star Trek: Deep Space Nine Vol. 23 - Tribunal/The Jem' Hadar.

On April 1, 2003, Season 2 of Star Trek: Deep Space Nine was released on DVD video discs, with 26 episodes on seven discs. This included a Dolby Digital 5.1 audio track for the episodes.

This episode was released in 2017 on DVD with the complete series box set, which had 176 episodes on 48 discs.
