= Progress (Star Trek: Deep Space Nine) =

- Star Trek: Deep Space Nine episode
- Episode no.: Season 1 Episode 15
- Directed by: Les Landau
- Written by: Peter Allan Fields
- Production code: 415
- Original air date: May 10, 1993

Guest appearances
- Aron Eisenberg as Nog; Brian Keith as Mullibok; Nicholas Worth as Alien Captain; Michael Bofshever as Toran; Terrence Evans as Baltrim; Annie O'Donnell as Keena; Daniel Riordan as Guard

Episode chronology
← Previous "The Storyteller"	Next → "If Wishes Were Horses"
- Star Trek: Deep Space Nine season 1

"Progress" is the 15th episode of the American science fiction television series Star Trek: Deep Space Nine.

Set in the 24th century, the series follows the adventures on Deep Space Nine, a space station located near a stable wormhole between the Alpha and Gamma quadrants of the Milky Way Galaxy, in orbit of the planet Bajor. In this episode Kira deals with a stubborn farmer who refuses to leave his home which is slated for destruction; Jake and Nog cooperate in a profit-seeking venture.

== Plot ==
Bajor plans to tap the core of one of its moons to provide energy—a process that will render the moon uninhabitable. An elderly farmer, Mullibok, refuses to evacuate, and Major Kira goes to the moon to investigate. Despite (or perhaps because of) Mullibok's stubbornness, Kira grows fond of him. Over dinner, he describes how he escaped to the moon during the Cardassian occupation of Bajor. Mullibok gets Kira to admit that the Bajorans beat the Cardassians because they "hung on like fanatics," drawing a parallel between their struggle and his.

Kira reports her findings to Sisko and to Minister Toran, who is overseeing the project. Toran sends her back with two security guards to remove Mullibok. Kira attempts to reason with Mullibok while he goes about finishing a kiln he has been building. The guards arrest Mullibok's friends (Baltrim and Keena, who have been unable to speak since the Cardassian occupation). Mullibok becomes furious and attacks one of the guards; the other shoots him.

Bashir arrives to treat Mullibok's wound, and Baltrim and Keena are evacuated to Bajor. Sisko, knowing Toran will be furious, recommends that Bashir report that Kira must remain on the moon for several more days for humanitarian reasons, at Bashir's recommendation.

In a parallel story, Jake Sisko and Nog acquire surplus yamok sauce that Quark has been unable to sell. The two make a succession of trades, eventually ending up with a strip of land on Bajor. When they overhear that the government is trying to secure the land for a building project, the pair offer it to Quark for five bars of gold-pressed latinum.

Back on the moon, Kira continues to bond with Mullibok. Sisko visits to remind Kira that her job is in jeopardy for supporting Mullibok. The two talk as Kira works on Mullibok's kiln, and she comes to realize that after years of fighting for the underdog she is now working for the other side. Sisko tells her a runabout is standing by to complete the evacuation.

After a night spent caring for Mullibok, Kira awakens to find him putting the final touches on his kiln. Kira tells him he has finished his work and she must finish hers. As long as his cottage stands, Mullibok says, he will remain on the moon. Kira destroys the kiln with her phaser and sets the cottage ablaze. Mullibok declares that he will die if he leaves. "I won't let you," Kira says, and calls the runabout for "Two to beam up."

== Production ==
The self-sealing stem bolt prop was painted plastic and brass, with spring loaded pins and was 5.25 inches long. It was used for closeup shots, and also had blinking lights.

== Critical response ==
Doux Reviews gave "Progress" 4 out 4, and praised the character development for Kira Nerys.

In 2018, SyFy recommend this episode for its abbreviated watch guide for the Bajoran character Kira Nerys. They note how this former resistance leader turned diplomat must struggle with her emotions and sense of duty. She is faced with a challenging case of forced relocation pitting the new Bajoran government's plan for development against some citizens.

In 2019, ScreenRant ranked this one of the top ten episodes for the character Nog, noting his friendship with Jake.
