= Valiant (Star Trek: Deep Space Nine) =

- Star Trek: Deep Space Nine episode
- Episode no.: Season 6 Episode 22
- Directed by: Michael Vejar
- Written by: Ronald D. Moore
- Production code: 546
- Original air date: May 4, 1998

Guest appearances
- Aron Eisenberg as Nog; Paul Popowich as Tim Watters; Courtney Peldon as Farris; David Drew Gallagher as Riley Shepard; Ashley Brianne McDonogh as Dorian Collins; Scott Hamm as Parton; Majel Barrett as Federation Computer; Mark Allen Shepherd as Morn

Episode chronology
← Previous "The Reckoning"	Next → "Profit and Lace"
- Star Trek: Deep Space Nine season 6

"Valiant" is the 146th episode of the television series Star Trek: Deep Space Nine, the 22nd episode of the sixth season. It was first broadcast on television on May 4, 1998.

Set in the 24th century, the series follows the adventures of the crew of the Starfleet-run space station Deep Space Nine. The later seasons of the show follow a war between the United Federation of Planets and a powerful empire known as the Dominion. In this episode, the young Starfleet officer Nog and his friend Jake Sisko find themselves on board a starship crewed by a squad of elite Starfleet cadets.

== Plot ==
While en route to Ferenginar in a runabout, Jake Sisko and Nog are attacked by a Dominion vessel, but are rescued by the Federation starship Valiant. They find that the crew are all members of Red Squad, an elite squadron of Starfleet cadets. Red Squad was on Valiant for a training mission when the ship was attacked by Dominion forces, resulting in the loss of the entire commissioned staff. Before dying, the late captain transferred command to now–acting Captain Tim Watters.

Watters says the late captain was ordered to seek tactical intelligence on a new Dominion battleship, and the Valiant has continued to pursue that mission under Watters's command, but its damaged warp drive has prevented it from getting close enough to observe the Dominion ship. Nog has the expertise to repair the engine, and Watters appoints him Chief Engineer; but Jake is seen as an outsider. When Jake talks to Collins, one of the cadets, about her personal life, she breaks down emotionally, and Watters orders Jake not to talk to her further.

With Nog's help, the Valiant is able to scan the battleship. Watters informs the crew that their mission has been carried out, and they could go home now, but he wants them to attempt to destroy the Dominion vessel, using a weak point in its design they believe the scan has revealed. Jake tries to tell them that his father Benjamin Sisko, one of the finest battle commanders in Starfleet, would never engage in such a foolhardy attack, but the cadets are won over by Watters' enthusiasm and the lure of becoming heroes.

When Jake attempts to warn Nog and Collins that the mission is too dangerous to succeed, Watters has Jake thrown in the brig. The Valiant attacks the Dominion vessel and successfully hits the targeted area, but the ship remains undamaged. The battleship returns fire, killing Watters and much of the crew, and critically damaging the Valiant. Recognising the Valiant is doomed, Nog gives the order to abandon ship; he and Collins free Jake from the brig, and they flee the Valiant in an escape pod just before it explodes. The remaining escape pods are either destroyed by the battleship or caught in the explosion, but Jake, Nog and Collins are rescued by Jake's father's ship, the Defiant. Nog states that the Valiant was a good ship with a good crew, whose only mistake was blindly following Watters' disastrous orders. To Collins' protestation that Watters was a great man, Nog replies, "He may have been a hero, he may even have been a great man, but in the end, he was a bad captain."

== Reception ==
The episode received Nielsen ratings of 4.6 points corresponding to about 4.5 million viewers.

Zack Handlen of The A.V. Club gave it a positive review, praising the casting and the "sense of avoidable but inevitable tragedy."

== See also ==
- Starfleet Academy
- The First Duty (Star Trek: The Next Generation) (also focuses on Starfleet cadets)
- Coming of Age (Star Trek: The Next Generation)
