= Aron Eisenberg =

American actor and podcaster (1969–2019)

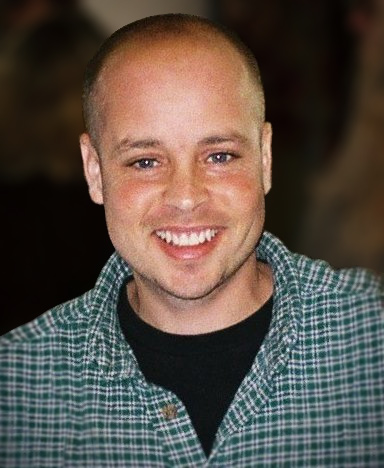
- Eisenberg in 1998
- Born: January 6, 1969; Los Angeles, California, U.S.
- Died: September 21, 2019 (aged 50); Los Angeles, California, U.S.
- Education: Moorpark College
- Occupations: Actor; photographer
- Years active: 1988–2019
- Spouse(s): Jessica Eisenberg (divorced) Malíssa Longo (m. 2018)
- Children: 2

Aron Eisenberg (January 6, 1969 – September 21, 2019) was an American actor and podcaster known for his role on Star Trek: Deep Space Nine as the Ferengi, Nog.

== Early life ==
Eisenberg was born January 6, 1969.

He was born with only one partially functioning kidney. This condition limited his height, and he received a kidney transplant at the age of 14. Eisenberg studied theatre at Moorpark College in Moorpark, California.

== Career ==
Eisenberg appeared on TV shows including Tales from the Crypt, Amityville: The Evil Escapes, Parker Lewis Can't Lose, and The Wonder Years. He guest-starred in "Motherly Love", an episode of Brotherly Love. He played the recurring character Jerry on the 1990s TV series The Secret World of Alex Mack. He appeared in films such as The Liars' Club, Puppet Master III, Streets, and The Horror Show.

Eisenberg is most known for his recurring role as the Ferengi character Nog through all seven seasons of Star Trek: Deep Space Nine, from 1993 to 1999. While this part called for him to appear under heavy makeup, he appeared without makeup as a news vendor in the episode "Far Beyond the Stars". Meanwhile he guest-starred as a young Kazon warrior in "Initiations", an episode of Star Trek: Voyager. He was later a host and producer of the Star Trek themed podcast The 7th Rule, with fellow Deep Space Nine actor Cirroc Lofton. Stephanie Marceau of Screen Rant listed her 10 favorite episodes featuring the character: "Empok Nor", "Valiant", "Progress", "The Visitor", "Badda-Bing Badda-Bang", "Treachery, Faith, and the Great River", "The Jem'Hadar", "The Magnificent Ferengi", "Heart of Stone", and "It's Only a Paper Moon".

Eisenberg performed on stage in such productions as The Indian Wants the Bronx, On Borrowed Time, and Minor Demons. He occasionally directed for the theater, as in the 1997 production of On Borrowed Time and the 1998 production of The Business of Murder at the Conejo Players Theater. His final performance was in 7 Days to Vegas (2019).

Eisenberg contributed to two books in the Dragonlance shared universe. He was credited as the originator of the Players of Gilean, an immortal troupe of actors in the fantasy world. Eisenberg's work was published in The Best of Tales, volume 1, written in collaboration with Margaret Weis, and The Players of Gilean, written in collaboration with Jean Rabe.

== Personal life and death ==
Eisenberg worked as a professional photographer, opening his own gallery sometime before 2013. In August 2015, Eisenberg was once again diagnosed with kidney failure. On December 29, 2015, he received a successful kidney transplant. On December 28, 2018, Eisenberg eloped with Malíssa Longo. He was also a father to two sons with his previous wife Jessica Eisenberg.

Eisenberg died aged 50 onSeptember 21, 2019.

== Tribute ==
In the Star Trek: Discovery episode "Die Trying" that aired November 12, 2020, Eisenberg was honored by a flyby of an Eisenberg-class ship named the USS Nog. The ship was offered as a prize to players for completing the winter 2021 event in the Star Trek Online video game, in which Eisenberg had reprised his role of Nog before his death.

On May 4, 2026, the main belt asteroid 2010 DS_{9} was named (666312) Aroneisenberg in his honor. The naming citation commemorates Eisenberg's depiction of Nog, stating that he turned the character from a minor role into a fan favorite, as well as his later work as a podcaster.

== Filmography ==
=== Acting ===
==== Film ====
Year	Title	Role	Notes
1989	The Horror Show	Scott McCarthy	Slasher film directed by James Isaac
1989	Beverly Hills Brats	Simon	Comedy film directed by Jim Sotos
1990	Streets	'Roach'	Drama film directed by Katt Shea
1990	Playroom	Daniel	Horror film directed by Manny Coto
1990	Prayer of the Rollerboys	Teen Boy	Science fiction film directed by Rick King
1991	Puppet Master III: Toulon's Revenge	Peter Hertz	Direct-to-video horror film directed by David DeCoteau; Prequel to Puppet Master and Puppet Master II
1993	The Liars' Club	'Buzz'	Thriller film directed by Jeffrey Porter
1996	Pterodactyl Woman from Beverly Hills	Tommy Chandler	Horror film written and directed by Philippe Mora
2017	Star Trek: Renegades	Fnaxnor	Fan film based upon the Star Trek franchise directed by Tim Russ
2019	7 Days to Vegas	'Peanut'	Comedy film directed by Eric Balfour; Also known as Walk to Vegas

==== Television ====
Year	Title	Role	Notes
1988	Straight Up	Kevin	Episode: "Jam"
1989	Amityville 4: The Evil Escapes	Brian Evans	Made-for-TV movie directed and co-written by Sandor Stern
1989	Caddie Woodlawn	Olaf	Made-for-TV movie directed by Giles Walker, based on the children's historical fiction novel of the same name by Carol Ryrie Brink
1990	The Wonder Years	Elf	Episode "A Very Cutlip Christmas"
1991	Parker Lewis Can't Lose	Steven	Episode "Jerry: Portrait of a Video Junkie"
1991	Tales from the Crypt	Aaron	Episode "Undertaking Palor"
1993–1999	Star Trek: Deep Space Nine	Nog	Recurring
1994	The Secret World of Alex Mack	Jerry	Episodes "School Dance" and "The Feud"
1995	Star Trek: Voyager	Kar	Episode "Initiations"
1996	Brotherly Love	Ricky 'Little Ricky'	Episode "Motherly Love"
1998	Star Trek: Deep Space Nine	Newspaper Vendor	Episode "Far Beyond the Stars"
1998	Brave New World	Male Panelist	Made-for-TV movie directed by Leslie Libman and Larry Williams, loosely based on Aldous Huxley's novel of the same name
2001	The Division	Franklin	Episode "Partners in Crime"
2003	Star Trek: Enterprise	Klingon Judge	Episode "Judgement"
2014	Sidewalks Entertainment	Himself	Episode: "Star Trek's Rom & Nog"
2016	Cozmo's	'Curly'	Made-for-TV movie directed by A.B. Stone
2017	Blade of Honor	Raejin Tektonopolis	Recurring
2019	The 7th Rule	Himself	Co-host
2019	Sidewalks Entertainment	Himself (Archival footage)	Episode: "Remembering Aron Eisenberg"

==== Video game ====
Year	Title	Role	Notes
2010–2019	Star Trek Online	Nog (voice)	Massively multiplayer online role-playing game (MMORPG) developed by Cryptic Studios based on the Star Trek franchise.; Set in the 25th century, 30 years after the events of Star Trek: Nemesis.

=== Producer ===
Year	Title	Notes
2019	The 7th Rule	Eisenberg, Ryan T. Husk, & Cirroc Lofton were hosts of the series

=== Documentary ===
Year	Title	Role	Notes
2014–2016	From the Mouths of Babes	Himself	4 episodes
2018	What We Left Behind: Looking Back at Deep Space Nine	Himself	Retrospective of the series and possibly episode 1 of season 8, had it been made
