= Holography in fiction =

Holography is often used as a plot device in science fiction, appearing in a wide range of books, films, television series, animation and video games. Probably the first reference is by Isaac Asimov in his Foundation series starting in 1951.

Holography has been widely referred to in movies, novels, and TV, usually in science fiction, starting in the late 1970s. Science fiction writers absorbed the urban legends surrounding holography that had been spread by overly-enthusiastic scientists and entrepreneurs trying to market the idea. This gave the public overly high expectations of the capability of holography, due to the unrealistic depictions of it in most fiction, where they are fully three-dimensional computer projections (more like real-life volumetric displays) that are sometimes tactile through the use of force fields. Examples of this type of depiction include the hologram of Princess Leia in Star Wars, Arnold Rimmer from Red Dwarf, who was later converted to "hard light" to make him solid, and the Holodeck and Emergency Medical Hologram from Star Trek.

Holography served as an inspiration for many video games with the science fiction elements. In many titles, fictional holographic technology has been used to reflect real life misrepresentations of potential military use of holograms, such as the "mirage tanks" in Command & Conquer: Red Alert 2 that can disguise themselves as trees. Player characters are able to use holographic decoys in games such as Halo: Reach and Crysis 2 to confuse and distract the enemy. Starcraft ghost agent Nova has access to "holo decoy" as one of her three primary abilities in Heroes of the Storm.

Fictional depictions of holograms have, however, inspired technological advances in other fields, such as augmented reality, that promise to fulfill the fictional depictions of holograms by other means.
