= Holodeck =

Star Trek device

- A vacant holodeck on the Enterprise-D; the arch and exit are prominent.

The Holodeck is a fictional device from the television franchise Star Trek which uses "holograms" (projected light and electromagnetic energy which create the illusion of solid objects) to create a realistic 3D simulation of a real or imaginary setting in which participants can freely interact with the environment as well as objects and characters, and sometimes a predefined narrative.

In several series, holodecks are an amenity available to the crew of starships. In the series Star Trek: Deep Space Nine, a similar device is referred to as a holosuite, operated by the owner of the space station's bar, Quark, who rents them out to customers.

From a storytelling point of view, the holodeck permits the introduction of a wide variety of locations and characters, such as events and persons in the Earth's past, or imaginary places or beings, that would otherwise require the use of plot mechanisms such as time-travel or dream sequences. Writers often use it as a way to pose philosophical questions.

== Origins ==
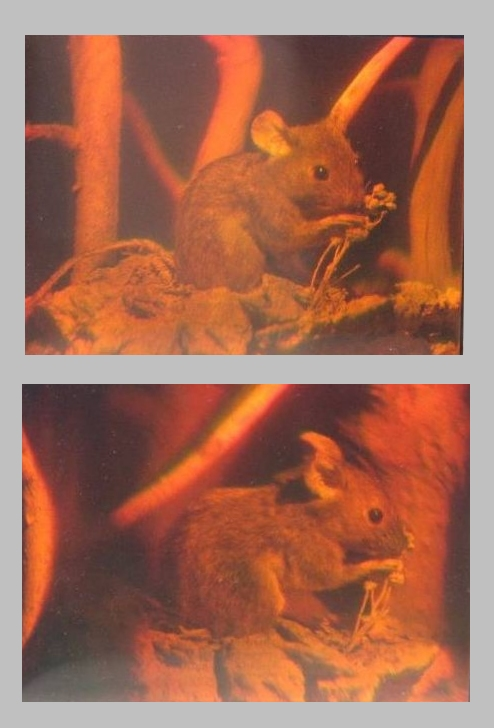
Two photographs of a single hologram taken from different viewpoints. Holograms provide a real-world starting point for the fictional holodeck of Star Trek.

Prior to Star Trek, science-fiction writer Ray Bradbury wrote about a technology-powered "nursery", a virtual reality room able to reproduce any place one imagines, in his 1950 story "The Veldt".

The word holograph comes from the Greek words ὅλος (holos; "whole") and γραφή (graphē; "writing" or "drawing"). Hungarian-British physicist Dennis Gabor received the Nobel Prize in Physics in 1971 "for his invention and development of the holographic method", work done in the late 1940s. The discovery was an unexpected result of research into improving electron microscopes; the original technique is still used and is known as electron holography. Optical holography was made possible by the development of the laser in 1960. The first practical optical holograms recording 3D objects were made in 1962 by Yuri Denisyuk in the Soviet Union and by Emmett Leith and Juris Upatnieks at the University of Michigan in the United States.

The Star Trek holodeck was inspired by inventor Gene Dolgoff, who owned a holography laboratory in New York City. Star Trek creator Gene Roddenberry met Dolgoff in 1973.

The concept and portmanteau HOLO(graphy) and DECK (of a ship) may also have originated at MIT aboard the sailing vessel Starship through the laboratories of holographer Stephen Benton, inventor of the "Rainbow Hologram" in 1968 and physicist Philip Morrison, a Manhattan project scientist, both of whom entertained Boston-born Leonard Nimoy during his visits to MIT prior to 1987.

== History ==
The first appearance of a holodeck-type technology in Star Trek came in the Star Trek: The Animated Series episode "The Practical Joker", where it was called the "recreation room". In the episode's story, Dr. McCoy, Sulu and Uhura are trapped inside it by the ship's computer.

The chronologically first in-universe appearance of a holodeck was in Star Trek: Enterprise episode "Unexpected". The first appearance of a holodeck on a Starfleet ship was in the Star Trek: Strange New Worlds episode "A Space Adventure Hour", in which the Enterprise is given directive to test the new technology. In the episode's story, Lieutenant La'An evaluates the holodeck's parameters by attempting to solve a murder mystery in a 1960s Hollywood setting. However, this early holodeck malfunctions and draws too much power from the Enterprise, putting both La'An inside the simulation and the crew of the ship at risk; La'An subsequently advises that the holodeck should not be used until the technology has improved which Montgomery Scott has several suggestions for.

In Star Trek: The Next Generation, the holodeck was a part of the series from its first episode (being where Riker meets Data), and was a frequently used plot mechanism beginning with the 1988 episode "The Big Goodbye", in which the holodeck played a central part of the plot. It also often played a role in Star Trek: Voyager with several programs being devised by Tom Paris. Before The Doctor received a futuristic mobile emitter, he was confined to sickbay and the holodeck.

== Depiction ==
In most Star Trek episodes, the holodeck is a normal room within a starship. A panel outside the entrance offers the user various settings to select a program or adjust the experience.

The inside of the holodeck, when not running a program, is typically shown as an empty room of medium size. The floor and walls are depicted in different ways, either covered in a bright yellow grid on a black background (in Star Trek: The Next Generation and Star Trek: Strange New Worlds), a metallic grid structure (in Star Trek: Voyager), or various other mechanisms.

When the holodeck is activated, the room disappears, replaced by a realistic, interactive simulation of a physical world. The door also disappears until the program ends or the user requests an exit verbally. The holodeck can be controlled by voice commands, or a computer terminal called the "Arch" which can be summoned by verbal command to provide manual controls. Some simulations are preprogrammed, while others are constructed on the fly by the user describing objects to be simulated to the computer.

The simulated environment is not limited to the size of the room, but can be any conceivable size, and participants can move freely, as far as they like. In some cases, the holodeck is shown to create an internal space at least as large as a starship. The opening scene of the 1994 film Star Trek Generations features a holodeck simulation of a sailing ship including a surrounding ocean.

The environment, objects and people are created from a combination of projected light, force fields, and replicated matter (using the same technique as the food replicators). Holographic projections are solid within the holodeck, and can be interacted with as if they were real, but disappear instantly when the program ends, or degrade rapidly if removed from the holodeck. However, some episodes do show simulated matter persisting beyond the confines of the holodeck, such as in "Encounter at Farpoint", in which Wesley Crusher falls into a holographic stream, and remains wet after leaving the holodeck.

Living characters within the holodeck can be given varying levels of intelligence, from total lack of animation, to fully interactive, convincing simulations of human beings and other sapient beings, even including self-awareness. Users can observe a scenario passively, with none of the simulated characters recognizing their presence, or can take an active role, playing the part of one of the characters in the narrative.

The metaphysical questions raised by self-aware simulated characters are explored in several Star Trek episodes, including "Elementary, Dear Data", in which a holodeck recreation of Professor Moriarty becomes self-aware and demands a life outside of the holodeck; unable to meet his demands, Captain Picard saves Moriarty's program against the day when that will be possible. A story arc spanning the entire series of Star Trek: Voyager is the development of a holographic emergency medical program, known as The Doctor, from an intelligent but limited holographic tool into a fully realized sapient being. Originally restricted to sickbay, the character is eventually given a portable holographic projector that allows him to move freely and even leave the ship.

The holodeck is often depicted being used for practical purposes by Starfleet officers in the pursuit of their duties; it is used by the Enterprise's tactical officers to create simulated opponents for combat training, and the holodeck is sometimes used to recreate real events for the purposes of criminal investigation.

It also serves a recreational function; "holonovelists" produce programs with real or fictional scenarios for entertainment, and in several episodes of Star Trek: The Next Generation, Captain Jean-Luc Picard takes part in stories in which he plays the role of one of his boyhood heroes, fictional detective Dixon Hill.

Multiple Star Trek series suggest the use of holodecks for sexual experiences. In Star Trek: Deep Space Nine, patrons of Quark's bar pay for hourly rentals of "holosuites" and pornographic holoprograms. The Holodecks in the animated comedy series Star Trek: Lower Decks possess "bodily fluid filters", also insinuating that the holodecks are used for sexual purposes.

Some users develop a pathological obsession with the holodeck, a condition known to the characters as holo-addiction. Star Trek: Voyager also introduces alien beings known as photonic lifeforms who believe holodeck programs are real, rather than computer-driven simulations.

Although the Holodeck is supposed to be safe, preventing users from being injured even by realistic violence, many Star Trek shows feature plots in which the holodeck malfunctions and creates genuine dangers, or if the safety protocols have been disabled, which requires the authorization of two senior officers.

By 2399, when Star Trek: Picard begins, holomatrix guest rooms have become a familiar amenity. On board Rios' ship, La Sirena, the hospitality hologram (one of Rios' holographic doppelgängers) escorts Picard to a perfect re-creation of the study in his chateau in France. According to the hologram, who came with the ship's basic installation, Zhaban provided the holoscans, thinking Picard might feel more at home. The view outside the window is a projection—Picard says "Hold" to pause the display and the birdsong—but all the objects within have been materialized, including Dahj's necklace.

== Reception ==
The Star Trek: The Next Generation episode "The Big Goodbye" (airdate January 11, 1988), featuring a story set in the holodeck, was honored with a Peabody Award in recognition of its "new standard of quality for first-run syndication". "The Big Goodbye" was also nominated for two Emmy Awards in the categories of Outstanding Cinematography for a Series and Outstanding Costumes for a Series; costume designer William Ware Theiss won the award. "The Big Goodbye" is the only Star Trek episode to win a Peabody Award.

== Similar technology in other works ==
- Author Alexander Moszkowski may have been the first person to envision something resembling a 'holodeck' concept.
- The Nursery in "The Veldt" (1950) by Ray Bradbury.
- In 1965, computer scientist Ivan Sutherland imagined an artificial environment in which mere 'displays' might attain to solid reality.
- Russian science-fiction movie Moscow-Cassiopeia (1973) shows a "Surprise Room" which operates in a similar way to a holodeck.
- Japanese TV series Space Battleship Yamato (1974) features a "resort room" capable of creating simulated environments.
- The X-Men comic book series depicts a training room called the Danger Room which was originally depicted as a mechanical affair (1963), but later as using holograms and other sensory simulation (1983).
- The “imaging chamber” that Admiral Al Calavicci uses to communicate with Dr. Sam Beckett in Quantum Leap.
- The HoloShed aboard the Nimbus in Futurama's fourth televised season resembles the holodeck in function and aesthetic, though the holograms have the ability to become real.
- Abed Nadir's "dreamatorium" from the third season of the U.S. television sitcom Community is inspired by the holodeck both in its function and in its aesthetic, though the simulations are a product of imagination rather than actual projections.
- Environmental Simulators on TV show The Orville.

== See also ==
- Augmented reality
- Extended reality
- On-set virtual production
