= Prophet Motive =

- Star Trek: Deep Space Nine episode
- Episode no.: Season 3 Episode 16
- Directed by: René Auberjonois
- Written by: Ira Steven Behr; Robert Hewitt Wolfe
- Story by: William N. Stape (uncredited source)
- Production code: 462
- Original air date: February 20, 1995

Guest appearances
- Max Grodénchik as Rom; Wallace Shawn as Zek; Tiny Ron as Maihar'du; Juliana Donald as Emi

Episode chronology
← Previous "Destiny"	Next → "Visionary"
- Star Trek: Deep Space Nine season 3

"Prophet Motive" is the 62nd episode of the television series Star Trek: Deep Space Nine and is the sixteenth episode of the third season. In the episode, Grand Nagus Zek comes to the station to present Quark with a revised copy of the Rules of Acquisition, which is now a guide for generosity and benevolence.

The episode aired in broadcast syndication starting February 20, 1995.

== Plot ==
Grand Nagus Zek, the "financial leader" of the Ferengi race and Quark's idol, arrives on the station and shows Quark and Rom his new project: he has rewritten the Rules of Acquisition, the sacred business proverbs by which the Ferengi live. In the new book, Zek encourages Ferengi everywhere to renounce selfishness and greed and become kind and giving. Zek now wants to lead a life of altruism and wants Quark and Rom to run his charitable foundation. This horrifies Quark, because profiteering lies at the heart of Ferengi identity, and the Grand Nagus is supposed to be the paragon. Quark warns Rom that other Ferengi will violently depose the Nagus if he tries to change the Ferengi way of life.

Doctor Bashir can find no sign of mental or physical illness in Zek, and his uncharacteristic behavior does not appear to be a ruse. Wanting answers, Quark and Rom break into Zek's shuttle and discover an Orb of the Prophets, which Zek is planning to give to the Bajorans. When Quark is exposed to the Orb, he has a vision in which Zek describes the New Rules of Acquisition as a "gift". Quark deduces that Zek visited the wormhole and contacted the Prophets so that he could use their knowledge of the future for profit, and that they are responsible for Zek's transformation.

Quark forcibly takes Zek back to the wormhole to ask the Prophets what they did to him. The Prophets, being immaterial creatures who do not experience time linearly, found Zek's obsession with accumulation of material wealth to be strange and adversarial. They "de-evolved" him to a more primitive state, resembling the less greedy ancestors of the Ferengi. They threaten to de-evolve Quark as well, but Quark warns them that if he is also changed, more curious Ferengi will visit the wormhole looking for answers. Because the Prophets like their privacy and find Ferengi annoying, they release Quark and restore Zek to normal.

Zek dismantles his charitable foundation and has all copies of the New Rules of Acquisition destroyed. After Zek leaves, Rom confides that he embezzled money from Zek's foundation, which delights and impresses Quark.

A subplot involves Bashir being nominated for a medical award which he ends up not winning. Bashir feigns nonchalance, but inside he is seething.

== Production ==
The episode was written by Ira Steven Behr and Robert Hewitt Wolfe and was the first of eight episodes directed by René Auberjonois, who also plays Odo. The story was inspired by a story by William N. Stape.

== Reception ==
Zack Handlen of The A.V. Club notes that when humor is marked out as "comic relief" and draws attention to itself, that usually means it's not working, "But sometimes, it works, and “Prophet Motive” is one of those times." Keith R.A. DeCandido of Tor.com gave the episode two out of ten.

== Releases ==
This episode was released on LaserDisc in Japan on October 2, 1998, in the half-season collection 3rd Season Vol. 2. The set included episodes from "Destiny" to "The Adversary" on double sided 12 inch optical discs; the box set had total runtime of 552 minutes and included audio tracks in English and Japanese.

== See also ==
- "Family Business"
