= Rules of Acquisition (Star Trek: Deep Space Nine) =

- Star Trek: Deep Space Nine episode
- Episode no.: Season 2 Episode 7
- Directed by: David Livingston
- Story by: Hilary J. Bader
- Teleplay by: Ira Steven Behr
- Production code: 427
- Original air date: November 8, 1993

Guest appearances
- Max Grodénchik as Rom; Wallace Shawn as Grand Nagus Zek; Helene Udy as Pel; Tiny Ron as Maihar'du; Brian Thompson as Inglatu; Emilia Crow as Zyree

Episode chronology
← Previous "Melora"	Next → "Necessary Evil"
- Star Trek: Deep Space Nine season 2

"Rules of Acquisition" is the seventh episode of the second season of the American science fiction television series Star Trek: Deep Space Nine. It is the 27th episode overall.

Set in the 24th century, the series follows the adventures on Deep Space Nine, a space station located near a wormhole between the Alpha and Gamma quadrants of the galaxy. This is one of several episodes to focus on the Ferengi, an alien species known for their devotion to earning profit, exploring their sexist social norms. In this episode, Deep Space Nine's Ferengi bartender Quark is sent to establish a Ferengi business presence in the Gamma Quadrant, assisted by Pel — a Ferengi female who disguises herself as a male to be permitted to engage in business.

The title of the episode refers to the Rules of Acquisition, a set of aphorisms that are said to govern Ferengi business practices, several of which are quoted in the episode.

== Plot ==
Grand Nagus Zek, the leader of the Ferengi, plans to establish a business presence in the Gamma Quadrant. Zek appoints Quark as his representative to negotiate with a species called the Dosi; Quark asks Pel, one of his employees, to assist him. Pel proves to be a valuable assistant; however, unbeknownst to Quark, Pel is a female. Ferengi females are not allowed to wear clothing, earn money, or travel, so she is forced to keep her identity a secret. Meanwhile, Pel begins to fall in love with Quark. She confesses her secret to Deep Space Nine's science officer Jadzia Dax.

Quark and Pel ask to purchase 10,000 vats of tulaberry wine from the Dosi. They are close to making a deal when Zek informs Quark that he wants 100,000 vats. The Dosi abandon the deal. Quark and Pel follow them to their homeworld, where they learn that 100,000 vats is more tulaberry wine than exists on the planet. A Dosi offers to put them in contact with another race, the Karemma, a member of what she calls "The Dominion". Quark and Pel realize Zek's true intentions: He has no interest in tulaberry wine; he wants to learn about the Dominion.

Quark and Pel return to DS9. While they were gone, Quark's brother Rom, jealous of Quark's preference for Pel over him, discovered Pel's true identity. He tells Quark, who realizes his career could be ruined if he were known to have done business with a female. Quark confronts Pel, offering her money to leave and start a new life, in order to save her and himself from punishment. Pel confesses her feelings for Quark and pleads with him to come with her to the Gamma Quadrant, where no one would mind that she is a Ferengi female who makes profit. Quark refuses, though he has feelings for Pel as well.

At a dinner celebrating Quark's negotiating success, Pel reveals her identity to Zek. Zek threatens to put Pel and Quark in prison, but Quark defends Pel by observing that Zek himself unknowingly allowed a female Ferengi to represent him. Realizing that they were all misled, they decide to keep Pel's identity a secret. After sharing a heartfelt goodbye with Quark, Pel leaves to start a new life in the Gamma Quadrant. Some time later, Dax comments that Quark will miss Pel, though he tries to deny it.

== Reception ==
In 2015, Geek.com recommended this episode as "essential watching" for their abbreviated Star Trek: Deep Space Nine binge-watching guide.

In 2018, SyFy included this episode on their Jadzia Dax binge-watching guide for this character.

In 2020, Io9 said this was one of the "must watch" episodes from the series.

== Arc significance ==
- This episode marks the first mention of the Dominion, a powerful empire in the Gamma Quadrant. From here, the Dominion will gradually increase in importance in the narrative of the series; the final two seasons of Deep Space Nine focus on a war between the Dominion and the United Federation of Planets.
- This episode also launches a plot arc focusing on Ferengi society and their gradual development away from the sexist social norms featured in this episode; later episodes on this theme include "Family Business" and "Ferengi Love Songs".

== Releases ==
It was released on LaserDisc in Japan on June 6, 1997 as part of the half season collection 2nd Season Vol. 1, which had seven doubled sided 12" discs. The discs had English and Japanese audio tracks.

On April 1, 2003, Season 2 of Star Trek: Deep Space Nine was released on DVD video discs, with 26 episodes on seven discs.

This episode was released in 2017 on DVD with the complete series box set, which had 176 episodes on 48 discs.
