= The Dogs of War (Star Trek: Deep Space Nine) =

- Star Trek: Deep Space Nine episode
- Episode no.: Season 7 Episode 24
- Directed by: Avery Brooks
- Story by: Peter Allan Fields
- Teleplay by: René Echevarria; Ronald D. Moore
- Cinematography by: Jonathan West
- Production code: 574
- Original air date: May 24, 1999

Guest appearances
- extensive, see #Guest stars

Episode chronology
← Previous "Extreme Measures"	Next → "What You Leave Behind"
- Star Trek: Deep Space Nine season 7

"The Dogs of War" is the 174th and penultimate episode of the American science fiction television series Star Trek: Deep Space Nine, the 24th of the seventh season. It is the eighth of the nine-episode story arc concluding the series. This episode was written by René Echevarria and Ronald D. Moore, based on a story by Peter Allan Fields, and was directed by Avery Brooks, who also played the role of Captain Benjamin Sisko.

Set in the 24th century, the series follows the adventures of the crew of the Starfleet-managed space station Deep Space Nine near the planet Bajor, as the Bajorans recover from a decades-long occupation by the imperialistic Cardassians. The station is adjacent to a wormhole connecting Bajor to the distant Gamma Quadrant; the wormhole is home to powerful alien beings worshipped by the Bajorans as the godlike "Prophets", who have made Sisko, DS9's human captain, their "Emissary". The later seasons of the series follow a war between the United Federation of Planets and the Dominion, an expansionist empire from the Gamma Quadrant ruled by the shapeshifting Changelings, which was instigated by the Dominion's annexation of Cardassia.

In this episode, when the organised Cardassian resistance against Dominion rule is wiped out, resistance leader Damar (Casey Biggs), with the aid of Starfleet Commander Kira (Nana Visitor) and ex-spy Garak (Andrew J. Robinson), tries to restart the resistance as a grassroots uprising. The episode also concludes the series's long-running plot arc exploring the politics of the greedy Ferengi, as the Ferengi leader Grand Nagus Zek (Wallace Shawn) announces his retirement and names Rom (Max Grodénchik), an engineering technician on DS9, as his successor.

== Plot ==
The Dominion lures the Cardassian rebellion into a trap, eliminating their forces in a single stroke. Damar, Garak, and Kira are forced into hiding in Garak's childhood home, protected by Mila (Julianna McCarthy), Garak's late father's housekeeper, where they see the Dominion's announcement that the rebellion has been crushed and Damar killed. Mila tells them that the Cardassian populace mistrust the propaganda, and Kira sees an opportunity to provoke a civilian revolution. The three bomb a Jem'Hadar barracks, where Damar reveals to the people that he is not dead, and calls upon the Cardassian populace to rise up against the Dominion.

On Deep Space Nine, Ferengi bartender Quark (Armin Shimerman) receives a message from Grand Nagus Zek, apparently informing him that he has been chosen as Zek's successor upon his imminent retirement. Upon discovering that Zek has instituted a number of reforms, including promoting workers’ rights, environmental protection and outlawing monopolies, Quark is so disgusted that he threatens to turn down the job. Upon Zek's arrival, Quark discovers that he was never the intended heir of the Grand Nagus; it was Quark's brother Rom (Max Grodénchik). Quark swears that his bar will be a refuge for the unrestrained capitalism that was symbolic of his Ferenginar, though he admits that his brother is better suited to be the leader of a new Ferenginar.

Several minor subplots set the stage for the upcoming series finale. Sisko is given command of a new starship USS Defiant to replace the Defiant recently destroyed by the Dominion. Security chief Odo is disgusted to learn that the Federation deliberately infected the Dominion's Changeling Founders with a deadly virus, using him as a carrier. Dr. Julian Bashir and Lt. Ezri Dax finally acknowledge their mutual attraction and begin a romantic relationship. The Dominion withdraws its forces to within Cardassian borders, hoping that the Federation and its allies will leave them alone long enough for them to rebuild their fleets; but Sisko persuades Admiral Ross (Barry Jenner) to launch a full-scale assault on Cardassia to end the war. Sisko's wife Kasidy Yates (Penny Johnson Jerald) tells him that she is pregnant, but she is concerned by a warning from the Prophets that Sisko, as the Emissary, must walk his path alone.

== Guest stars ==
The episode features the main cast of Deep Space Nine, as well as many supporting and guest stars.

- Casey Biggs as Damar
- Jeffrey Combs as Brunt and Weyoun
- Aron Eisenberg as Nog
- Max Grodénchik as Rom
- J. G. Hertzler as Martok
- Barry Jenner as Admiral Ross
- Salome Jens as Female Changeling
- Penny Johnson Jerald as Kasidy Yates
- Chase Masterson as Leeta
- Julianna McCarthy as Mila
- Andrew J. Robinson as Garak
- Tiny Ron as Maihar'du
- Wallace Shawn as Grand Nagus Zek
- Cecily Adams as Ishka
- Mel Johnson, Jr. as Broca
- Vaughn Armstrong as Seskal
- Stephen Yoakam as Velal
- Paul Eckstein as Jem'hadar
- David B. Levinson as Broik
- Cathy DeBuono as M'Pella
- LeRoy D. Brazile as Lonar

== Production ==
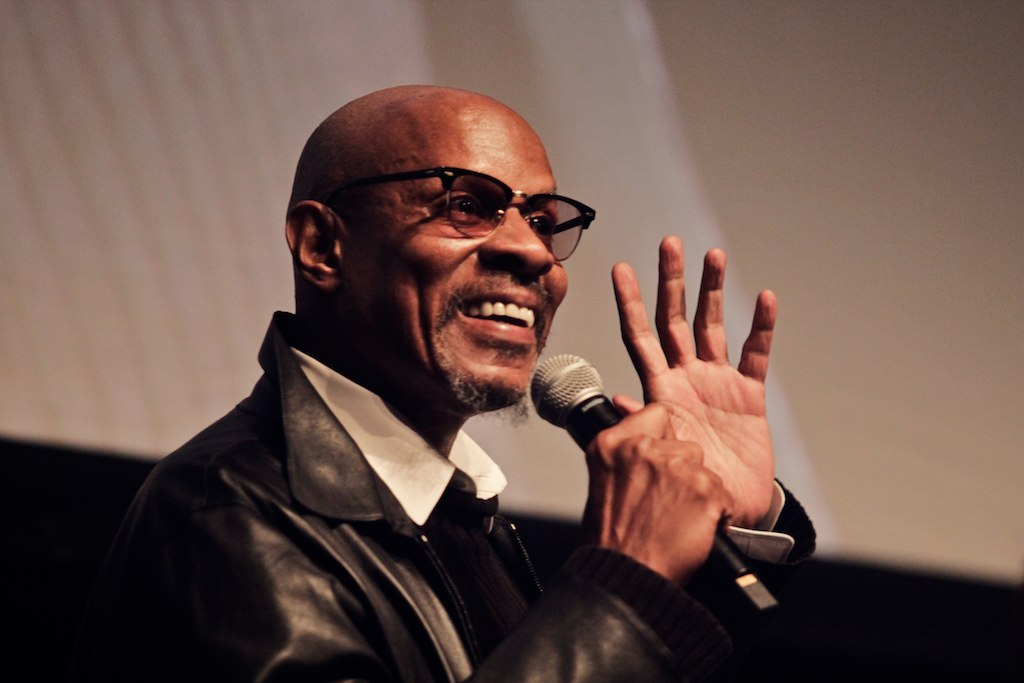
Avery Brooks both directed the episode and had the role of Sisko.

This episode had teleplay written René Echevarria and Ronald D. Moore, with the story by Peter Allan Fields.

It was directed by Avery Brooks, who also plays Captain Sisko; Brooks directed 9 episodes of DS9 overall.

This is the 8th (and last) appearance of the ambitious Ferengi official Brunt and the 30th (and second last) appearance of Dominion administrator Weyoun, recurring characters both played by Jeffrey Combs since season 3 (Brunt, "Family Business") and season 4 (Weyoun, "To the Death"). This was the only episode to feature both, but there are no scenes with both characters present.

The episode title "The Dogs of War" comes from Act 3, Scene 1, line 273 of Julius Caesar by William Shakespeare, where Mark Antony says "Cry 'Havoc!', and let slip the dogs of war.". (see also Shakespeare and Star Trek)

In a previous episode, "The Changing Face of Evil", the USS Defiant was destroyed and the writers had wanted a new ship, rather than the same design. However, they did not have the budget for a new ship. As a result they replace the Defiant with another Defiant-class ship, the Sao Paulo, and add the plot point that Starfleet will allow the crew to rename it Defiant.

Armin Shimerman (Quark) named this episode as one of his favorites, explaining: "I always thought my character was not as well developed as other characters. I came to the realization of how much the character really had changed. The writers did such a good job the actor didn't notice the changes."

== Reception ==
This received Nielsen ratings of 3.7 points, just under 3.7 million viewers when it was broadcast on television in May 1999.

This episode is part of the concluding story arc of Star Trek: Deep Space Nine. In 2018, CBR ranked the final episodes, starting with "The Changing Face of Evil" and concluding with the final episode, "What You Leave Behind", as the best multi-episode saga in the Star Trek franchise.

Reviewing the episode for Tor.com, Keith R.A. DeCandido gave it a rating of 8 out 10, praising how the writers balanced multiple story lines and characters, and thought it "helps put everything in place for the grand finale."
