= Rivals (Star Trek: Deep Space Nine) =

- Star Trek: Deep Space Nine episode
- Episode no.: Season 2 Episode 11
- Directed by: David Livingston
- Story by: Jim Trombetta; Michael Piller
- Teleplay by: Joe Menosky
- Production code: 431
- Original air date: January 3, 1994

Guest appearances
- Chris Sarandon as Martus; Max Grodénchik as Rom; Rosalind Chao as Keiko O'Brien; Barbara Bosson as Roana; K Callan as Alsia; Albert Henderson as Cos

Episode chronology
← Previous "Sanctuary"	Next → "The Alternate"
- Star Trek: Deep Space Nine season 2

"Rivals" is the 31st episode of the American science fiction television series Star Trek: Deep Space Nine. It is the 11th episode of the second season.

Set in the 24th century, the series follows the adventures on Deep Space Nine, a space station located near a stable wormhole between the Alpha and Gamma quadrants of the Milky Way Galaxy, near the planet Bajor. In this episode, a con artist opens a new bar that competes with Quark's.

== Plot ==
Security chief Odo places El-Aurian Martus Mazur in a holding cell after accusing him of swindling aboard Deep Space Nine. While in his cell, Martus acquires a gambling device that alters the laws of probability after his cellmate, an old man named Cos, dies. His luck changes and he is released from confinement after the elderly couple he conned decide not to press charges.

With his new and intriguing device, he sets up a bar and casino with larger versions of the original device as gambling machines. The bar is a success and draws business away from Quark's bar. The device soon turns on him and he himself is conned into losing a large sum of money. In addition, the couple he swindled out of money change their mind and press charges against him.

Meanwhile, Miles O'Brien attempts to get in shape so that he can compete with Julian Bashir at racquetball. As part of a ploy to regain lost business for the bar, Quark is able to trick O'Brien and Bashir into participating in a public tournament that people can bet on. When O'Brien performs abnormally well, he realizes that there are statistical abnormalities on the station. The crew discover the effects of the devices in Martus's establishment, and O'Brien and Bashir agree to cancel the rest of the game. To prevent more tampering with natural probability, Commander Sisko and science officer Dax destroy the device.

== Reception ==
Zack Handlen of The A.V. Club described the episode as "bad TV that shrugs" and "passable". He criticized the main story for "the fact that it spends too much time on a character we’ve never seen before" and the secondary plot for feeling incomplete and sloppy. Tor.com rated the episode 4 out of 10.

== Home media releases ==
It was released on LaserDisc in Japan on June 6, 1997, as part of the half season collection 2nd Season Vol. 1, which had 7 doubled sided 12" discs. The discs had English and Japanese audio tracks.

On April 1, 2003, Season 2 of Star Trek: Deep Space Nine was released on DVD video discs, with 26 episodes on seven discs.

This episode was released in 2017 on DVD with the complete series box set, which had 176 episodes on 48 discs.
