= Distant Voices (Star Trek: Deep Space Nine) =

- Star Trek: Deep Space Nine episode
- Episode no.: Season 3 Episode 18
- Directed by: Alexander Singer
- Story by: Joe Menosky
- Teleplay by: Ira Steven Behr; Robert Hewitt Wolfe
- Cinematography by: Jonathan West
- Production code: 464
- Original air date: April 10, 1995

Guest appearances
- Andrew J. Robinson - Garak; Victor Rivers - Altovar; Ann H. Gillespie - Nurse

Episode chronology
| ← Previous "Visionary" | Next → "Through the Looking Glass" |
- Star Trek: Deep Space Nine season 3

"Distant Voices" is the 64th episode overall of the syndicated American science fiction television series Star Trek: Deep Space Nine, the 18th episode of the third season. It was broadcast in syndication starting April 10, 1995.

Set in the 24th century, the series follows the adventures on Deep Space Nine, a space station located near a stable wormhole between the Alpha and Gamma quadrants of the Milky Way Galaxy. In this episode, a telepathic attack on Dr. Julian Bashir (Alexander Siddig) causes him to experience rapid aging as the station suffers a strange power failure and his crewmates begin acting strangely.

The episode won an Emmy award for Outstanding Individual Achievement in Makeup for a Series.

== Plot ==
At their usual lunch, Dr. Bashir confesses to Garak his anxiety over his impending thirtieth birthday, explaining to the Cardassian that, in human culture, age thirty is generally considered, "the end of youth, and the beginning of the long, slow march into middle age." Their conversation is interrupted by Quark and his newest business associate, a Lethean named Altovar, who is looking to buy bio-mimetic gel, a highly restricted substance. Bashir refuses, and Altovar angrily storms off. When Bashir returns to the infirmary later, he finds Altovar has broken in and is stealing bio-mimetic gel from his medical supplies. Altovar attacks Bashir with an electrical field knocking him unconscious. He awakens to find that he has begun to age quickly. Furthermore, the station is dark, flickering, and deserted, apparently having undergone some catastrophe.

Bashir explores the silent station and walks in on several members of the crew arguing. They barely notice him when he walks in, and seem unfazed by his graying hair and wrinkling skin. Barely audible whispers echo in the background, and when Chief O'Brien begins repairing the communications system, Bashir hears that the whispers are actually the voices of his crewmates, and they are talking about him. They say he is in a coma, and he is dying.

Bashir realizes that the crew and the empty station are all in his head, and he is actually living in a dreamlike state within his comatose mind. Altovar appears, grabs Lt. Dax and drags her away. Bashir feels that he has lost something, and realizes that each member of the crew in this vision represents a different aspect of his personality. When Altovar captures Commander Sisko, it is as though he has taken away the most steady, able part of his psyche, crippling him. Altovar threatens to kill each crew member, chipping away at Bashir's mind until there is nothing left.

Bashir ages quickly, reaching a weakened, elderly state. He and Garak go to Ops, where the last of the crew lie dying. Garak prods Bashir, trying to convince him to just give up and die, but Bashir works hard with the last of his strength to find out what is going on. Garak becomes more insistent, and Bashir figures out that he is actually Altovar. Knowing this, he can shrug off Garak's taunting and make his way back to the infirmary, his home base on the station. This gives him more strength and he uses it to trap and kill Altovar with the infirmary's sterilization field. He wakes from his coma, with his real crewmates keeping vigil over him. They inform him that while he was battling Altovar's psychic illusion, the real Altovar tripped the infirmary's security alarm and was arrested by Odo shortly after the break-in.

Afterward, while Bashir is eating lunch with Garak, he says he cannot help but take it personally that Bashir's mind would present him as someone untrustworthy. He adds, "There is hope for you yet, doctor".

== Releases ==
This episode was released on LaserDisc in Japan on October 2, 1998, in the half-season collection 3rd Season vol.2. The set included episodes from "Destiny" to "The Adversary" on double sided 12 inch optical discs; the box set had a total runtime of 552 minutes and included audio tracks in English and Japanese.

The episode was released on home video by Paramount on VHS (catalog number) VHR 4143, paired with "Visionary".

== See also ==
- "Q-Less" - the first season episode where Bashir first discusses how he missed being valedictorian in medical school, a subject Altovar torments him with in this episode.
- "Explorers" - a later third season episode where Bashir is forced to confront the student who became valedictorian of his class in medical school.
