= Ferengi Love Songs =

- Star Trek: Deep Space Nine episode
- Episode no.: Season 5 Episode 20
- Directed by: René Auberjonois
- Written by: Ira Steven Behr; Hans Beimler
- Production code: 518
- Original air date: April 21, 1997

Guest appearances
- Max Grodénchik as Rom; Tiny Ron as Maihar'du; Chase Masterson as Leeta; Jeffrey Combs as Brunt; Cecily Adams as Ishka; Hamilton Camp as Leck; Wallace Shawn as Zek

Episode chronology
← Previous "Ties of Blood and Water"	Next → "Soldiers of the Empire"
- Star Trek: Deep Space Nine season 5

"Ferengi Love Songs" is an episode of Star Trek: Deep Space Nine, the twentieth episode of the fifth season.

Set in the 24th century, the series follows the adventures of the crew of the space station Deep Space Nine near the planet Bajor. A recurring plot arc focuses on the politics of the profit-seeking race known as the Ferengi. In this episode, Deep Space Nine's Ferengi bartender Quark (Armin Shimerman) visits his mother on his home planet, Ferenginar, and finds she is romantically involved with Grand Nagus Zek, the leader of the Ferengi people. Meanwhile, back on Deep Space Nine, Quark's brother Rom (Max Grodénchik) and his fiancée Leeta (Chase Masterson) work on their relationship.

This episode is one of eight episodes of Deep Space Nine directed by Rene Auberjonois, who also played the role of Odo on the series.

== Plot ==
With his bar closed due to an infestation of Cardassian voles, Quark is depressed noting that nothing has gone right since he was blacklisted by the Ferengi Commerce Authority and had his business licence was made void. He feels even worse when Rom and Leeta announce they're getting married. At Rom's suggestion Quark returns to Ferenginar for some comfort from his mother, Ishka. Quark discovers that the Ferengi leader, Grand Nagus Zek, is romantically involved with Ishka and living in her house.

Zek demands Quark keep their affair a secret. Quark is thrilled that his mother is now the beloved of the most powerful man on the planet; however, Zek refuses to reinstate Quark's revoked business license, reminding Quark that he broke a contract. Quark returns to his room, where Liquidator Brunt, the FCA agent who revoked his license, confronts him. Brunt offers to restore Quark's business license if he breaks up Zek and Ishka. Quark agrees, and makes Zek doubt Ishka's motives in order to end their relationship. The plan works, and his mother is heartbroken. Brunt keeps his word and renews the business license.

Zek offers Quark the position of First Clerk. Quark happily accepts—and then discovers the Nagus is not the profit-making whiz he once was. By day's end, the Ferengi market exchange has experienced a drastic slide due to the Nagus's failing memory. A stunned Quark returns home, where Ishka reveals that she was more than Zek's lover – she was the power behind the throne, helping him make business decisions. Ishka realizes that Quark turned Zek against her, and may have destroyed the Ferengi economy in the process.

Brunt reveals that his plan was to disgrace Zek, allowing Brunt to become the new Grand Nagus. Quark feels guilty over what he has inadvertently done. The next day, Quark saves Zek by supplying him with enough brilliant advice to turn around the economic situation, but then reveals that the advice actually came from Ishka. After Quark admits to breaking them up, Zek and Ishka happily reunite. Brunt decides to let Quark keep his licence, only so he can see him fail again in the future. Ishka meanwhile, thanks Quark for his help by giving him his childhood action figurines that he previously thought were thrown out. A touched Quark thanks his mother, who says “ No, Thank you Quark!”

Back on Deep Space Nine, Quark's brother Rom finds his wedding plans derailed when his Bajoran fiancée Leeta refuses to sign a Ferengi prenuptial agreement that says she will give up all claim to money and properties. Rom eventually realizes Leeta is more important to him than money or Ferengi traditions and donates all his money to charity, and the wedding is back on.

== Reception ==
In 2015, Geek.com recommended this episode for their abbreviated Star Trek: Deep Space Nine binge-watching guide.

In 2018, CBR ranked Grand Nagus Zek, one of the characters featured in this episode, the 13th best recurring character of all Star Trek.
