= Ishka =

Star Trek: Deep Space Nine character

- Star Trek: Deep Space Nine character
- First appearance: "Family Business"; May 15, 1995
- Last appearance: "The Dogs of War"; May 26, 1999
- Portrayed by: Andrea Martin (1995); Cecily Adams (1997–99)

In-universe information
- Species: Ferengi
- Significant other: Zek
- Children: Quark and Rom

Ishka is a fictional character from the science fiction television series Star Trek: Deep Space Nine (DS9). A female Ferengi, she is the mother of Quark (Armin Shimerman) and Rom (Max Grodénchik). Ishka appears in five canon episodes of DS9, and also features in seven licensed-but-non-canon Star Trek novels.

Conceptualized as a feminist character, Ishka was played by Andrea Martin once and Cecily Adams four times. Both actresses endured a lot of makeup, prostheses, and costuming. Adams loved the character, and was stunned by the positive fan reaction to Ishka.

== Conception ==
Ishka was conceived as a Ferengi "women's libber" that Robert Hewitt Wolfe described as transcending the stereotypical protester. Ishka did not want to end the Ferengi profit-making way of life, but wanted Ferengi females to be able to take part in it. Immediately after Ishka's introduction in "Family Business" the idea of bringing her together with Grand Nagus Zek came about. René Auberjonois (Odo) even anticipated the pairing in an interview with Starlog for their January 1996 issue.

== Casting ==
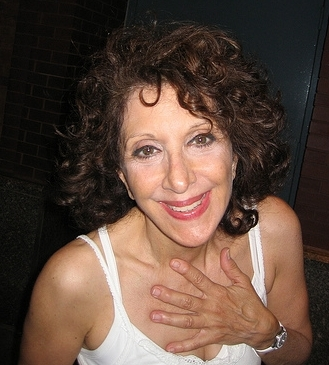
Andrea Martin (2008)

Director David Livingston recalled that they had a difficult time finding somebody to play Ishka; at one point, he even made the unpopular suggestion that Wallace Shawn (Grand Nagus Zek) appear in drag as Quark and Rom's mother. Andrea Martin was cast at the suggestion of episode director René Auberjonois (Odo), who felt the actress could manage the right balance of comedy and good acting that was missing from the applicants he had seen thus far. Showrunner Ira Steven Behr agreed with Auberjonois on the casting, later saying he loved her on Second City Television. Martin was offered the role without even having to audition. Ira Behr, Robert Hewitt Wolfe, and David Livingston all had good things to say about the casting of Martin as Ishka.

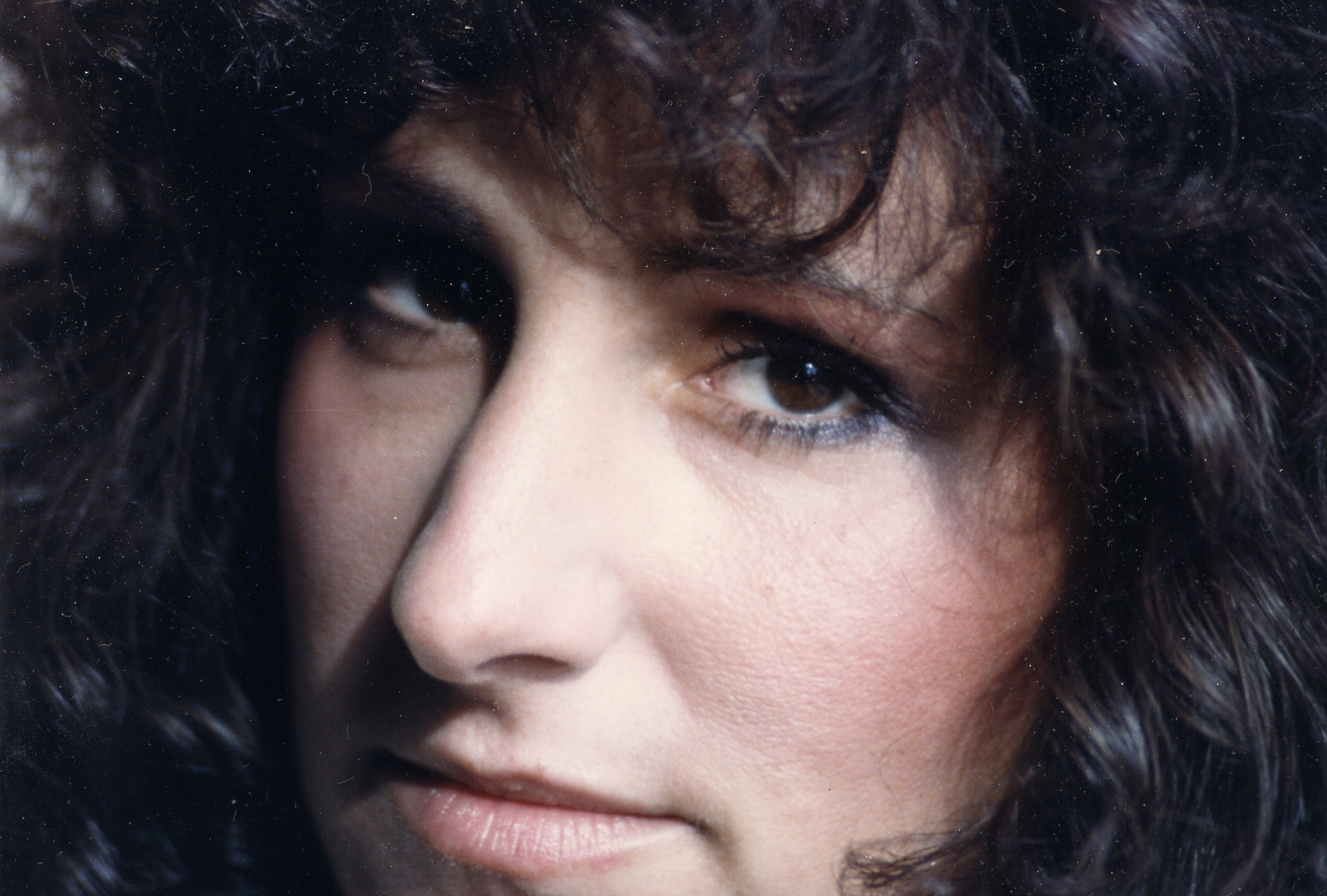
Cecily Adams (undated)

When, at the last minute, Martin could not return for "Ferengi Love Songs", the show held auditions for the role and saw "a lot of people". Prior to auditioning, Cecily Adams was only peripherally familiar with the Star Trek universe, having only seen a few Next Generation and Voyager episodes. Adams was friends with actress Kitty Swink, and auditioned with the help of Swink's husband Armin Shimerman (Quark); Shimerman loaned her a tape of Martin's episode—"Family Business"—from which she learned "how broad the character was." Adams attributed her successful audition to the many similarities between her and Martin: not only did Martin's costumes fit without need for alteration, but so did the prosthetic faceplate. Adams was described as a "natural mimic" by the Star Trek: Deep Space Nine Companion; Behr said that Adams "just did Moogie." Even though she had the character down pat, Adams would later admit to having trouble with the Star Trek vernacular. Ishka was a radical departure for Adams: she'd never played an alien before, usually being cast as secretaries in shows such as Simon & Simon and Murphy Brown.

== Makeup and costuming ==
Martin in "Family Business"

Before Andrea Martin accepted the role, director René Auberjonois (Odo) confided in her that working under the Ferengi prosthetics would be the hardest acting she'd ever done if she'd never worked under such makeup before. Auberjonois speculated that she took the role anyway because he'd been so frank with her. Martin's makeup for Ishka took three hours every day. Ishka, being older, required extra development of the makeup prostheses. Makeup designer Michael Westmore explained that they "made a thin skin that went over one of [their] stock Ferengi heads. They [then] made a new face for her, wrinkled, and did the backs of her hands." The script for "Family Business" also complicated the makeup process because it called for Ishka to be nude in several scenes; therefore, makeup needed to be developed for parts of Ferengi never before seen. One take over Ishka's shoulder had to be reshot because the producers felt that Martin's "supple skin" didn't match the character; Westmore and crew "took Kleenex, wrinkled it up and rubberized it, and covered her back and shoulders", a process Martin didn't care for, saying, "Boy, if you hadn't warned me about this, I would be out the door."

Adams in "Profit and Lace"

Having never before worn prostheses, Cecily Adams found the Ishka makeup "rather daunting" and described the three to four hour application process before moving on to costuming. Originally the producers drew lines on Adams' hands to make them appear older, but later decided they did not look old enough and used prosthetic gloves. Once all was said and done, only the palms of Adams' hands and her upper lip were visible. After begging and pleading with the DS9 staff to see the dailies, Adams realized how much she needed to over-express to have her facial expressions translate through the makeup. When she came back to DS9 for season six's "The Magnificent Ferengi", Adams agreed on the condition she receive her own custom faceplate. Adams praised the other DS9 actors who suffered through similar makeup ordeals saying, "I think it's astonishing that they were all in good cheer, and to be in the makeup all the time is really something." Because Ishka is flouting Ferengi law by wearing clothes, it was decided that she would overdo it, and so Adams was encumbered with "baubles and bangles and beads" that made so much noise on set that Adams estimated she had to dub half her lines. For "Profit and Lace", where Ishka was to leave the Ferengi homeworld for the first time, Adams was dressed in a "Spandex suit from [her] wrists to the tip of [her] toes". Further, because Ishka was old, the staff padded Adams' costume with 30 or 40 pounds (14 or 18 kg), including fake breasts that Adams guessed weighed 15 pounds (6.8 kg); after watching the dailies, both Adams and Behr agreed that the breasts needed to be reduced as they were too distracting. Adams would later thank both director René Auberjonois and co-star Armin Shimerman for helping her realize that overacting was the name of the game when working under such prostheses.

== Character history ==
In "Family Business", Ishka is introduced as a Ferengi widow who receives a monthly stipend from her elder son, Quark (Armin Shimerman). Per Ferengi law, she is forbidden from making profit or wearing clothing, yet she has begun doing both and is found out by the Ferengi Commerce Authority (FCA; an agency essentially equivalent to the United States' Internal Revenue Service). The FCA charges Quark with his mother's misdeeds, about which she is unrepentant, feeling that women should have the same rights and privileges as men. After much arguing with Quark, Iskha agrees to sign a confession and forfeit her earnings for her son's sake, though she confides in Rom (Max Grodénchik) that she only gave up a third of what she had hidden away.

Season five's "Ferengi Love Songs" reveals the romantic relationship between Ishka and Grand Nagus Zek, the leader of the Ferengi Alliance. When Quark is unable to extract nepotistic assistance from the Grand Nagus, he colludes with Liquidator Brunt (Jeffrey Combs) to break up the couple. Quark soon realizes however that Ishka is the real power behind the throne, giving Zek financial advice and suggestions that keep the Ferengi economy afloat. Quark confesses his part, and helps reunite Ishka and Zek.

In "The Magnificent Ferengi" (season six), Ishka is kidnapped by the Dominion. While in captivity at the hands of the Vorta Yelgrun (Iggy Pop), Ishka offers financial advice and tries to empathize with her captor about family. In the same season, "Profit and Lace" finds Ishka leaving the Ferengi homeworld of Ferenginar for the first time to travel to Deep Space Nine in the company of Grand Nagus Zek. She has convinced Zek to amend the Ferengi Bill of Opportunities to allow women to wear clothing, and the result was economic turmoil across the Ferengi Alliance. When Ishka suffers a heart attack, Quark undergoes sex reassignment surgery to take her place at Zek's side and win back the support of an influential Ferengi commissioner. Doctor Bashir (Alexander Siddig) is able to successfully perform a heart transplantation for Ishka, and she is up and about by the end of the episode.

In the penultimate episode of Star Trek: Deep Space Nine, "The Dogs of War", Quark discovers that Ishka has influenced Grand Nagus Zek to the point where the Ferengi leader has promoted labor rights, enforced environmental protection, and outlawed monopolies.

=== Non-canon appearances ===
Ishka also appears in several officially-licensed, non-canon, Star Trek novels, e-books, and short stories:

==== Star Trek: The Next Generation ====
- Doors into Chaos by Robert Greenberger (2001)

==== Star Trek: Terok Nor ====
- Dawn of the Eagles by S. D. Perry & Britta Dennison (2008)

==== Star Trek: Deep Space Nine ====
- Ferenginar: Satisfaction Is Not Guaranteed by Keith DeCandido (2010)
- Lust's Latinum Lost (and Found) by Terry J. Erdmann & Paula M. Block (2014)
- Rules of Accusation by Terry J. Erdmann & Paula M. Block (2016)
- I, the Constable by Terry J. Erdmann & Paula M. Block (2017)

==== Star Trek: Mirror Universe ====
The Ishka of the Mirror Universe is wealthy, owns Terran slaves, and provided a safe harbor for the 'mirror-versions' of B'Elanna Torres and Crell Moset (from the Star Trek: Voyager episode "Nothing Human"). She appeared in the 2009 Star Trek: Mirror Universe story, "Bitter Fruit" by Susan Wright.

== Portrayal ==
Crediting Andrea Martin with her broad and confident initial portrayal of Ishka, Adams commented on how easy it was to play a character so well delineated. Adams also infused Ishka with some of the stories Shimerman told of his own mother. In an interview with Star Trek: The Magazine, Adams said of Ishka: "I love and adore her. How can you not? She just doesn't care what anybody thinks; she's so committed to what she thinks is right, and everyone else be damned. But she has a heart of gold, and she's very strong. To be a female as strong as she was, in the kind of world she came from, was wonderful, I think." Lauding the character, Adams says that it's Ishka's backbone that helps her grow as an actress and as a person. Prior to November 2000, Adams appeared at several Star Trek conventions with her "Ferengi family" and relished meeting fans who expressed how much they love the character of Ishka.
