= Necessary Evil (Star Trek: Deep Space Nine) =

- Star Trek: Deep Space Nine episode
- Episode no.: Season 2 Episode 8
- Directed by: James L. Conway
- Written by: Peter Allan Fields
- Production code: 428
- Original air date: November 15, 1993

Guest appearances
- Max Grodénchik as Rom; Marc Alaimo as Gul Dukat; Katherine Moffat as Vaatrik Pallra; Robert MacKenzie as Trazko

Episode chronology
← Previous "Rules of Acquisition"	Next → "Second Sight"
- Star Trek: Deep Space Nine season 2

"Necessary Evil" is the 28th episode of the American science fiction television series Star Trek: Deep Space Nine. It is the eighth episode of the second season.

Set in the 24th century, the series follows the adventures on Deep Space Nine, a space station near the planet Bajor, as the Bajorans recover from a long, brutal occupation by the imperialistic Cardassians. This episode focuses on Deep Space Nine′s security chief Odo, a shapeshifter of unknown origin. In this episode, an attack on the bartender Quark leads Odo to reopen an investigation into an unsolved murder dating back to the days of the Cardassian occupation. The episode features flashbacks to that time period, including the first time Odo met the Bajoran resistance fighter Kira Nerys, who is Deep Space Nine′s first officer during the time period in which the series is normally set.

== Plot ==
A Bajoran woman, Vaatrik Pallra, hires Quark to retrieve a strongbox from her late husband's shop on Deep Space Nine. Quark opens it to find a list of Bajoran names. A stranger, Trazko, sneaks up, shoots Quark and steals the list. As Dr. Bashir tries to revive Quark, Quark's brother Rom tells Odo about the list of names, and that the box was hidden in the shop during the Occupation.

In a flashback, five years earlier, Odo is solicited by the station's Cardassian commander Gul Dukat to investigate a murder. Odo interrogates Pallra, the deceased's widow. She claims her husband had been having an affair with Kira Nerys. When he interviews Kira, she says that there was no intimate relationship between her and Vaatrik, and that she was interviewing for a job at Quark's bar at the time of the murder.

In the present, Rom tells Odo that one name on the list resembled "Ches'so". Odo interviews Pallra, who claims ignorance of the list of names and the name "Ches'so". She also refuses to divulge the identity of the individual who loaned the money to pay her past-due electricity bill. Kira identifies "Ches'so": a philanthropist named "Ches'sarro", who has just died in suspicious circumstances.

Five years earlier, Quark admits that Kira bribed him to provide a false alibi. When Odo confronts her about it, Kira reveals that she was committing a terrorist attack on the station. Odo tells Dukat that Kira is not the culprit in the murder.

In the present, Odo deduces that the names on the list are Bajorans who collaborated with the Cardassians during the occupation, whom Pallra has been blackmailing. Trazko attempts again to kill Quark; Rom saves Quark's life by screaming, gaining the attention of security officers. Brought to DS9, Pallra denies knowing Trazko, but Odo has confirmed that she recently transferred a large sum of money into his bank account. When she declares her innocence in the murder of her husband, Odo replies, "I know."

Odo has realized that it is Kira who killed Vaatrik five years earlier. He tells Kira that he began to suspect her when she was able to identify Ches'saro so quickly. When he deduced that the list consisted of Bajoran collaborators, Odo realized that Vaatrik was a collaborator too, and now understands that Dukat chose him to investigate so as to keep distance from his collaborators. Kira, a member of the resistance, killed Vaatrik in self-defence when he caught her trying to steal the list of names. She never told Odo because she was afraid it would affect their friendship. Kira asks him if he will be able to trust her again, and he is unable to answer.

== Reception ==
When "Necessary Evil" was broadcast in November 1993, it received a Nielsen rating of 9.3 points and fifth place in its time slot.

Tor.com rated the episode ten out of ten, calling it "The perfect DS9 story. Everything that’s great about the show is on display here." It was the only episode of the season to achieve that rating.

In 2016, The Hollywood Reporter ranked "Necessary Evil" the 19th best episode in Star Trek: Deep Space Nine. They note this as an episode that differentiated this series from its predecessor, Star Trek: The Next Generation, and place the episode in the murder mystery genre.

In 2017, Screen Rant ranked this episode the eleventh darkest episode of the Star Trek franchise.

In 2018, SyFy recommend this episode for its abbreviated watch guide for the character Kira Nerys.

In 2019, Tor.com noted this as an "essential" for the character of Odo, remarking that it helps establish the character and what it was like for Odo while working for the Cardassians.

== Releases ==
It was released on LaserDisc in Japan on June 6, 1997, as part of the half season collection 2nd Season Vol. 1, which had 7 doubled sided 12" discs. The discs had English and Japanese audio tracks.

On April 1, 2003, Season 2 of Star Trek: Deep Space Nine was released on DVD video discs, with 26 episodes on seven discs.

This episode was released in 2017 on DVD with the complete series box set, which had 176 episodes on 48 discs.
