= Visionary (Star Trek: Deep Space Nine) =

- Star Trek: Deep Space Nine episode
- Episode no.: Season 3 Episode 17
- Directed by: Reza Badiyi
- Story by: Ethan H. Calk
- Teleplay by: John Shirley
- Production code: 463
- Original air date: February 27, 1995

Guest appearances
- Jack Shearer as Ruwon; Annette Helde as Karina; Ray Young as Morka; Bob Minor as Bo'rak; Dennis Madalone as Atul

Episode chronology
← Previous "Prophet Motive"	Next → "Distant Voices"
- Star Trek: Deep Space Nine season 3

"Visionary" is the 63rd episode of the television series Star Trek: Deep Space Nine, the seventeenth episode of the third season.

Set in the 24th century, the series follows the adventures on Deep Space Nine, a Starfleet-run space station adjacent to a wormhole leading to the distant Gamma Quadrant of the galaxy; the Gamma Quadrant is home to a powerful empire known as the Dominion. In this episode, Deep Space Nine's operations chief Miles O'Brien begins having visions of the future after an accident, while a delegation from the Romulan Empire visits the station.

When "Visionary" was broadcast in 1995, it achieved ratings of 7.9 and third spot in its time slot. This was in line with much of the ratings for Season 3 which varied between about six and nine Nielsen points over the course of its run (from October 1994 to July 1995). This was a popular time for the franchise, with Star Trek Generations hitting theaters in November 1994, and Star Trek: Voyager coming out in January 1995.

== Plot ==
A Romulan delegation visits Deep Space Nine in order to receive intelligence about the Dominion promised to the Romulans by Starfleet. Complicating matters is the presence on the station of a crew of Klingons, another alien race with a history of poor relations with the Romulans.

Chief O'Brien, as an unexpected side-effect of radiation exposure, begins experiencing time shifts, each five hours into the future. He witnesses a bar brawl, in which he saves his future self from being stabbed by Klingons. In another time jump, he sees his future self killed by an energy beam in a corridor near the Romulans' quarters. On returning from the time jump, he reports the incident; the resulting investigation detects the trap being installed by the Klingons, leading to the Klingons' arrest, preventing the energy beam event O'Brien witnessed.

In another time jump, he witnesses the destruction of the station. He deliberately subjects himself to more radiation in order to time shift only three hours into the future in order to see exactly what causes the destruction: a cloaked Romulan warship reveals itself and begins firing on the station. After telling his future self about his mission, he dies of radiation poisoning. It falls to the future O'Brien to go back in time to warn Commander Sisko about the Romulans' plot. Sisko, speculating that the Romulans intend to destroy the station and the wormhole in order to cut off further contact with the Gamma Quadrant, aims the station's weapons at the cloaked ship and has the Romulan delegates ejected from the station.

Later, O'Brien uses his limited knowledge of the future to annoy the profit-hungry Quark.

== Reception ==
In 2018, Comic Book Resources rated "Visionary" the 13th best time-travel episode in Star Trek, noting it as a 'showcase' for O'Brien and calling the plot 'intriguing'.

Writing for Tor.com in 2013, Keith R.A. DeCandido gave the episode a mixed review, with a rating of six out of ten: he praised the character portrayals and the episode's connections to the larger plot arcs of Deep Space Nine, but criticized the plot's reliance on technobabble.

== Releases ==
This episode was released on LaserDisc in Japan on October 2, 1998, in the half-season collection 3rd Season Vol. 2. The set included episodes from "Destiny" to "The Adversary" on double sided 12 inch optical discs; the box set had a total runtime of 552 minutes and included audio tracks in English and Japanese.

The episode was released on home video by Paramount on VHS (catalog number) VHR 4143, paired with "Distant Voices".
