= The Magnificent Ferengi =

- Star Trek: Deep Space Nine episode
- Episode no.: Season 6 Episode 10
- Directed by: Chip Chalmers
- Written by: Ira Steven Behr; Hans Beimler
- Production code: 534
- Original air date: December 29, 1997

Guest appearances
- Jeffrey Combs as Brunt; Max Grodénchik as Rom; Aron Eisenberg as Nog; Cecily Adams as Ishka; Josh Pais as Gaila; Christopher Shea as Keevan; Hamilton Camp as Leck; Chase Masterson as Leeta; Iggy Pop as Yelgrun

Episode chronology
← Previous "Statistical Probabilities"	Next → "Waltz"
- Star Trek: Deep Space Nine season 6

"The Magnificent Ferengi" is the tenth episode of the sixth season of Star Trek: Deep Space Nine, the 134th episode overall, originally aired in syndication on December 29, 1997. It was written by Ira Steven Behr and Hans Beimler, and directed by Chip Chalmers. The title is a reference to the film The Magnificent Seven, and the episode makes several minor homages to the film.

Set in the 24th century, the series follows the adventures of the crew of the space station Deep Space Nine; the later seasons of the series depict a war between the United Federation of Planets and an invasive empire known as the Dominion. This is one of several episodes to focus on the Ferengi, an alien species known for their devotion to earning profit. In the episode, the mother of Deep Space Nine's Ferengi bartender Quark is taken captive by the Dominion, and he puts together an all-Ferengi team to rescue her.

The episode is lighter in tone compared to the typical gritty Dominion War episodes of later Deep Space Nine seasons. It features Iggy Pop as a guest star, and Jeffrey Combs in his recurring role as Ferengi government agent Brunt.

== Plot ==
Quark learns that his mother, Ishka, has been captured by the Dominion. The Ferengi leader Grand Nagus Zek, who is also Ishka's lover, offers a reward of 50 bars of gold-pressed latinum for her rescue. Quark and his brother Rom decide to assemble an all-Ferengi commando team to rescue her, claiming that the reward is 20 bars so they can keep a larger share. They first recruit Rom's son Nog, making him "Strategic Operations Officer" for the mission. Next, they hire Leck, a Ferengi "eliminator", tempting him with the challenge of fighting the Dominion's Jem'Hadar soldiers. Quark bails out his cousin Gaila, who has been arrested for vagrancy, and signs him up as a chance for redemption. Disgraced ex-Liquidator Brunt, hoping to win Zek's favor, persuades them to add him to the team for the use of his ship.

In battle-training simulations, the Ferengi prove to be poor commandos; one simulation ends with Leck killing Ishka. Quark and Rom realize that although Ferengi may not be good commandos, they are excellent negotiators; instead of attacking the Dominion, they propose a prisoner exchange to win Ishka's freedom. Deep Space Nine's senior officers give Quark custody of Keevan, one of the Dominion's Vorta commanders, previously captured in the episode "Rocks and Shoals", and Quark arranges a meeting with the Dominion at the abandoned Cardassian space station Empok Nor.

The team makes base camp in Empok Nor's infirmary. The Dominion's negotiator, a Vorta named Yelgrun, arrives with Ishka in custody, guarded by a squad of Jem'Hadar. Quark offers his terms, to which Yelgrun agrees: all but two Jem'Hadar must leave the station before the prisoner exchange takes place. While celebrating their soon-to-be-successful exchange, Rom accidentally lets slip that the reward is actually 50 bars, not 20. In a rage, Gaila tries to shoot Quark but ends up killing Keevan.

Quark persuades the team not to give up, offering equal shares of the 50 bars. Nog discovers some working neural stimulators in the abandoned infirmary, which enables him to move Keevan's body by remote control. At the prisoner exchange, they are able to get Keevan's dead body to walk; Yelgrun does not realize Keevan is dead until after Ishka is safely with Quark, when Keevan walks into a bulkhead. The Ferengi ambush the two Jem'Hadar guards and capture Yelgrun; as they leave Empok Nor, Keevan's body continues walking into the bulkhead.

== Reception ==
io9 ranked "The Magnificent Ferengi" as the 92nd best episode of the Star Trek franchise in a 2014 listing. In 2015, Geek.com recommended this episode as "essential watching" for their abbreviated Star Trek: Deep Space Nine binge-watching guide.

In 2016, CNET noted that "The Magnificent Ferengi" was rated one of the top ten episodes of all Star Trek episodes in an audience-based rating at the Star Trek 50th anniversary convention. In 2018, Vulture.com rated "The Magnificent Ferengi" the eleventh best episode of Star Trek: Deep Space Nine, praising the episode's humor and performances by Jeffrey Combs and guest star Iggy Pop. CBR rated the episode as one of the top twenty funniest episodes of the Star Trek franchise in 2019.

In 2019, Screen Rant ranked this the third best episode for the character Nog.
