= William N. Stape =

American screenwriter

William N. Stape is an American screenwriter and magazine writer who wrote episodes of Star Trek: The Next Generation and Star Trek: Deep Space Nine.

== Early life ==
Born in Jersey City, New Jersey, Stape lived with his family in Toms River before moving to Bayonne, where he attended Bayonne High School and has lived since he was 10 years old.

== Career ==
Stape's first Star Trek episode work was a Star Trek: The Next Generation story called "Shadowdance", which involved the character Lt. Worf, and his adoptive brother, Nikolai Rozhenko. It eventually became the seventh-season episode "Homeward", which aired in January 1994. His next Trek story was for the spinoff Star Trek: Deep Space Nine. The story, called "Charity", involved the character Quark. It became the third-season episode "Prophet Motive", which aired in February 1995.

In 2007, Stape wrote an article criticizing the writing abilities of former Star Trek television and movie producer Rick Berman. Stape pointed out that Berman wrote more Star Trek: Enterprise episodes than he did any other Star Trek television series, and Enterprise remains the most critically lambasted incarnation of Star Trek. Stape wasn't alone in going public with criticism of Berman, David Weddle, who wrote for Star Trek: Deep Space Nine as a staff writer and producer, also has been critical of Berman's handling of the Star Trek franchise.

In 2015, publisher Bearmanor Media released Stape's first book, Star Trek Sex: Analyzing The Most Sexually Charged Episodes Of The Original Series.
