= Second Sight (Star Trek: Deep Space Nine) =

- Star Trek: Deep Space Nine episode
- Episode no.: Season 2 Episode 9
- Directed by: Alexander Singer
- Story by: Mark Gehred-O'Connell
- Teleplay by: Mark Gehred-O'Connell; Ira Steven Behr; Robert Hewitt Wolfe
- Production code: 429
- Original air date: November 22, 1993

Guest appearances
- Salli Elise Richardson as Fenna / Nidell; Richard Kiley as Gideon Seyetik

Episode chronology
← Previous "Necessary Evil"	Next → "Sanctuary"
- Star Trek: Deep Space Nine season 2

"Second Sight" is the 29th episode of the American science fiction television series Star Trek: Deep Space Nine. It is the ninth episode of the second season.

Set in the 24th century, the series follows the adventures on Deep Space Nine, a space station located near a stable wormhole between the Alpha and Gamma quadrants of the Milky Way Galaxy, near the planet Bajor. In this episode, station commander Benjamin Sisko develops feelings for a woman visiting the station, but there is more to her than he first thinks.

== Plot ==
While stargazing on the station's Promenade level at night, Sisko meets a woman named Fenna. After a brief conversation, Sisko finds she has left him without a word. Later, when the two meet again, Sisko takes Fenna on a tour of the station, and they rapidly fall in love. It is the first spark of romance he has felt since the death of his wife Jennifer four years earlier. However, Fenna is evasive when Sisko asks her about her life. Fearing that she may be in trouble, Sisko asks security chief Odo to check on her, but Odo can find no record of anyone meeting her description on the station.

Meanwhile, the renowned but egomaniacal terraformer Gideon Seyetik is visiting Deep Space Nine en route to his next project. The project, which he considers his magnum opus, is to re-ignite a dying star so that planets orbiting it can support life; the plan is to send an unmanned vessel carrying the necessary fuel on a collision course with the star.

Seyetik invites the senior staff of Deep Space Nine for dinner on board the Prometheus, the ship escorting him on his mission. He introduces his wife, Nidell, who looks exactly like Fenna. After dinner, Sisko privately converses with Nidell; however, she acts as if she has never met him before. Later that evening, Fenna appears at Sisko's quarters; she claims to know nothing about Nidell. As she is kissing Sisko, she suddenly vanishes into a beam of energy.

Sisko and science officer Dax accompany Seyetik aboard the Prometheus to observe the terraforming mission. When Fenna appears again, Dax determines that Fenna is nothing more than pure energy. Meanwhile, Nidell is unconscious and dying. Seyetik explains that Fenna is a telepathic projection of Nidell's subconscious, who appears during times of emotional stress. She is no longer happy in her marriage, but since her people mate for life she cannot leave her husband. Her projected dreams of freedom have created Fenna, but are also killing her.

While Sisko and Fenna are discussing the nature of her existence, Dax calls Sisko to the command bridge: Seyetik has boarded the vessel carrying the fuel and is piloting it directly toward the star. Sisko tries to deter him, but Seyetik is determined to set his wife free. With a final shout of "Let there be light!", he detonates the fuel and reignites the star, killing himself in the blast. Later, Nidell leaves to return to her homeworld, with no memory of Fenna's romance with Sisko.

== Reception ==
In 2019, ScreenRant ranked this episode one of the ten worst episodes of Star Trek: Deep Space Nine. They note that Seyetik's "arrogance made him a frustrating character and his final sacrifice less meaningful".

== Releases ==
It was released on LaserDisc in Japan on June 6, 1997 as part of the half season collection 2nd Season Vol. 1, which had 7 doubled sided 12" discs. The discs had English and Japanese audio tracks.

On November 11, 1997, "Second Sight" and "Sanctuary" were released on double sided LaserDisc in the United States.

On April 1, 2003 Season 2 of Star Trek: Deep Space Nine was released on DVD video discs, with 26 episodes on seven discs.

This episode was released in 2017 on DVD with the complete series box set, which had 176 episodes on 48 discs.
