= The Assignment (Star Trek: Deep Space Nine) =

- Star Trek: Deep Space Nine episode
- Episode no.: Season 5 Episode 5
- Directed by: Allan Kroeker
- Story by: David R. Long; Robert Lederman
- Teleplay by: David Weddle; Bradley Thompson
- Production code: 504
- Original air date: October 28, 1996

Guest appearances
- Rosalind Chao as Keiko; Hana Hatae as Molly; Max Grodénchik as Rom; Rosie Malek-Yonan as Tekoa

Episode chronology
← Previous "...Nor the Battle to the Strong"	Next → "Trials and Tribble-ations"
- Star Trek: Deep Space Nine season 5

"The Assignment" is the 103rd episode of the television series Star Trek: Deep Space Nine, the fifth episode of the fifth season.

Set in the 24th century, the series takes place on Deep Space Nine, a fictional space station near the planet Bajor, guarding a wormhole that leads to the other side of the galaxy. The wormhole is inhabited by the Prophets, powerful alien beings who are worshiped by the Bajorans as gods. This episode introduces the Pah-wraiths, the legendary evil counterparts of the Prophets: one of the Pah-wraiths possesses the body of Keiko O'Brien in order to coerce her husband, station operations chief Miles O'Brien, into carrying out an attack on the Prophets.

The episode's story was written by Robert Lederman and David R. Long, with a script by Bradley Thompson and David Weddle. It was directed by Alan Kroeker.

== Plot ==
Keiko O'Brien returns to Deep Space Nine from a trip to Bajor and tells her husband Miles that she is not actually Keiko but an entity possessing her body. She proves this to Miles by stopping her heart for a few seconds. Miles is given a list of modifications to make to the station, but isn't told what the entity's ultimate goal is. The entity makes it clear it is willing to kill Keiko as well as their daughter Molly if he tries to tell anyone. Miles infers that the entity is probably a Pah-wraith from Bajoran legends; but this doesn't help him devise a way to stop it. When he tries to alert others to what's going on, the Pah-wraith anticipates this and makes Keiko fall from a balcony. Keiko is just injured, but the entity manages to secure Miles's silence.

Being under a strict time limit, Miles enlists night-shift technician Rom to assist him with the modifications, instructing Rom to tell no one about what he is doing. Science officer Jadzia Dax spots the modifications, and, suspecting sabotage, alerts the Operations staff; Miles is forced to implicate Rom to divert suspicion from himself.

Rom is incarcerated but refuses to divulge anything about what he was doing and why. He insists that he will only speak to Miles. Rom has determined that the modifications they are making will fire a beam that will kill the Prophets. Rom and Miles are able to piece together what is going on: the Pah-wraiths are the Prophets' natural enemies, and the one possessing Keiko is using her to kill them all at once.

Security chief Odo is still suspicious, however, and confronts Miles while he is performing the last modifications. Miles knocks him unconscious, finishes the modifications, and calls "Keiko" to tell her to meet him at a runabout so he can take her to the wormhole. However, Miles actually fires the beam at the runabout, killing the Pah-wraith and leaving Keiko uninjured.

O'Brien rewards Rom for his hard work and help by promoting him to the day shift. Miles and Keiko later talk about the experience. Keiko believes the Pah-wraith would never have left either of them alive, and both are relieved their ordeal is over.

== Reception ==
In a 2013 review, The A.V. Club described the episode as a "fantastic" entry in a series of episodes featuring "Bad Days for Miles O'Brien", and praised Rosalind Chao's acting performance as fake Keiko. Keith R. A. DeCandido, writing for Tor.com in 2014, gave the episode a negative review. Although he praised Chao's performance, and appreciated the episode as a vehicle for the character Rom, he described the story as "paint-by-numbers" and the introduction of the Pah-wraiths as a "wrongheaded plot device".

In 2020, Den of Geek ranked this episode as the 13th most scary television episode of the Star Trek franchise.

== Releases ==
"The Assignment" is on disc 2 of the Season 5 DVD box set.
