= Cecily Adams =

American actress (1958–2004)

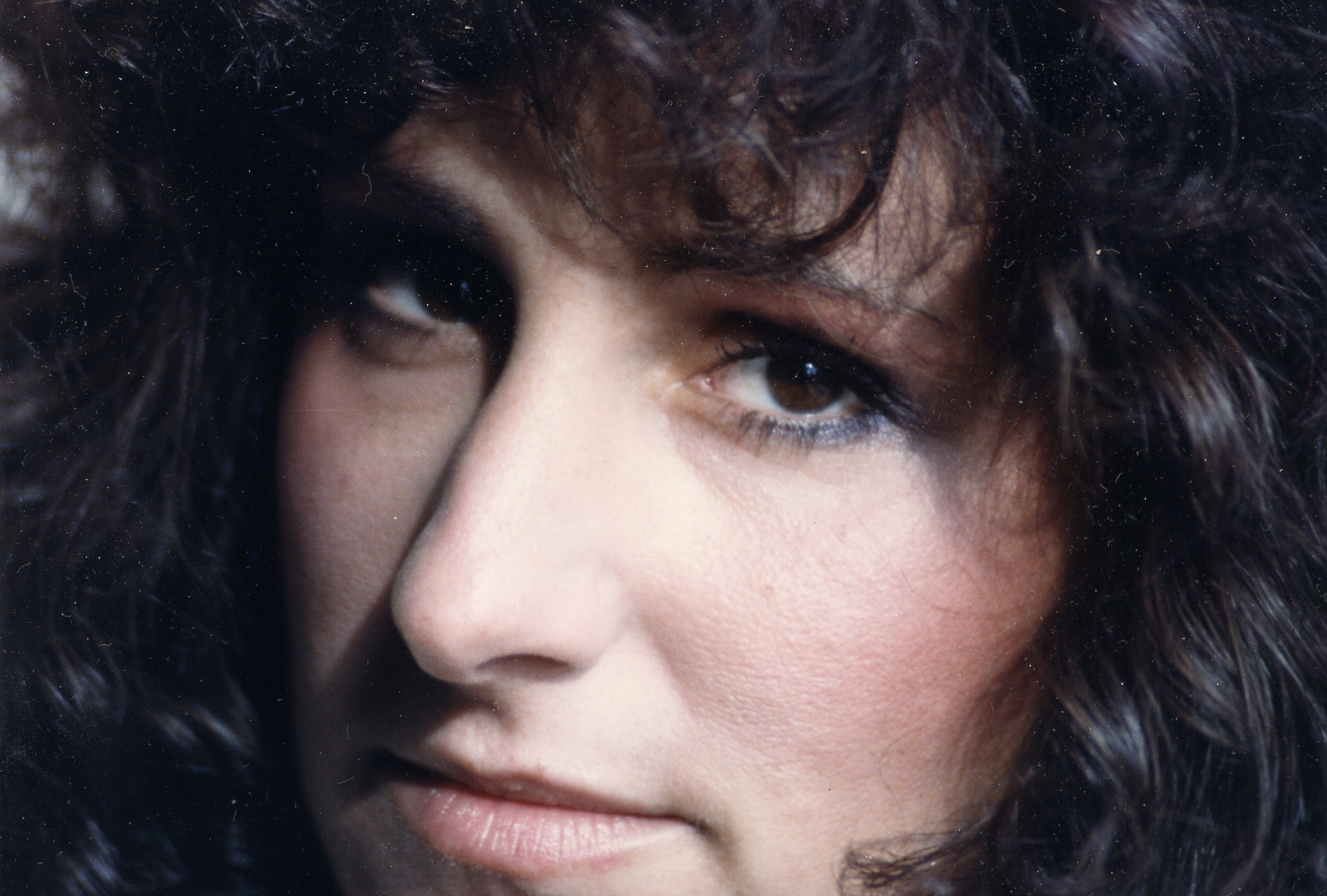
- Born: Cecily April Adams; February 6, 1958; New York City, U.S.
- Died: March 3, 2004 (aged 46); Los Angeles, California, U.S.
- Occupation: Actress
- Years active: 1982–2004
- Spouse: Jim Beaver (m. 1989)
- Children: 1
- Father: Don Adams
- Relatives: Dick Yarmy (uncle)

Cecily April Adams (February 6, 1958 – March 3, 2004) was an American actress.

== Early life ==
Adams was born in Jamaica, Queens, New York City, the daughter of comic actor Don Adams and singer Adelaide Efantis. Her siblings included her brother Sean, and her sisters Carolyn Steele, Christine Adams, Cathy Metchik, Paramount TV executive Stacey Adams and Beige Adams. She attended Beverly Hills High School, where she participated in acting, an activity she continued at the University of California, Irvine.

== Career ==
Adams studied improvisational comedy at the Groundlings and was a member of the Acme Comedy Theater in Los Angeles. She was also an acting coach.

Adams portrayed the recurring character of Ishka (also known as "Moogie"), mother of the Ferengi brothers Rom and Quark, in four of her five appearances in the television series Star Trek: Deep Space Nine, replacing Andrea Martin. Adams was, in fact, nine years younger than Armin Shimerman, who played Quark, despite playing his mother.

She appeared in guest roles on a variety of television series, including Just Shoot Me!, Murphy Brown, and Party of Five, and with her father in his television series Check It Out! and television movie Get Smart Again. Adams played a lead role in the 1991 independent feature film Little Secrets.

Adams was also a lyricist, and with her collaborator, David Burke wrote pop songs and commercial jingles and television theme songs.

Adams worked in casting TV series such as 3rd Rock From the Sun and Eerie, Indiana, and features including American Heart (1992) and Home Room (2002). Until her death, she served as casting director for That '70s Show.

== Personal life ==
Adams married actor/writer Jim Beaver in 1989; their daughter was born in 2001. Adams, though a non-smoker, died of lung cancer on March 3, 2004, at the age of 46, in Los Angeles, California. Her husband's memoir, Life's That Way, details her last few months. She was cremated and her ashes scattered at Fern Canyon in Prairie Creek Redwoods State Park, California, and at Franklin Canyon Park in Beverly Hills, California.

== Filmography ==
=== Casting ===
Cecily Adams casting director credits
Year	Title	Notes
1988	Who Framed Roger Rabbit	Film (as casting assistant, uncredited)
1991	Little Secrets	Film
1991–1992	Eerie, Indiana	19 episodes
1992	American Heart	Film
1998–2000	3rd Rock from the Sun	49 episodes
1999–2004	That 70s Show	128 episodes
2002	That 80s Show	13 episodes

=== Acting ===
Cecily Adams film and television credits
Year	Title	Role	Notes
1982	Simon & Simon	Muffin Goldstein	1 episode
1982	Quincy, M.E.	Roommate	1 episode
1987	Check It Out!	Psychiatrist	1 episode
1988	The Equalizer	Claudia	Episode: "Target of Choice"
1989	Get Smart, Again!	Customer	TV movie (bit part)
1991	Little Secrets	Roxanne	Film
1993	Melrose Place	Receptionist	1 episode
1995	Home Improvement	Dana	1 episode
1996	Murder One	Roberta Vogel	1 episode
1997	Just Shoot Me!	Doris	1 episode
1997	Party of Five	Diana	1 episode
1997	Murphy Brown	Secretary #86	1 episode
1997-1999	Star Trek: Deep Space Nine	Ishka / Patron in Vic's Lounge	Recurring role
1999	Total Recall 2070	Records Clerk	1 episode
