= Rom (Star Trek) =

Fictional character from Star Trek: Deep Space Nine, played by Max Grodénchik

- Star Trek character
- First appearance: "Emissary" (1993)
- Last appearance: "Parth Ferengi's Heart Place" (2023)
- Portrayed by: Max Grodénchik

In-universe information
- Species: Ferengi
- Affiliation: Ferengi Alliance; Bajoran Militia
- Children: Nog
- Posting: Deep Space Nine Resident (Seasons 1-7); Ferenginar Resident (Season 7)
- Position: Bar Employee (Seasons 1-4); Maintenance Engineer (Seasons 4-7); Grand Nagus (Season 7)
- Rank: Crewman (Seasons 4-7)
- Spouses: Prinadora (dissolved); Leeta

Rom is a recurring character on Star Trek: Deep Space Nine. He is played by Max Grodénchik.

Rom is a Ferengi, the son of Keldar and Ishka. He is Quark's younger brother, and the father of Nog. On the show he is often used for comic relief, but also grows in importance as the show progresses. In the early seasons, he works at Quark's bar, becoming a technician under Chief O'Brien later in the show's run.

== Background ==
Max Grodenchik previously played two different Ferengi characters in the Star Trek: The Next Generation episodes "Captain's Holiday" and "The Perfect Mate". While working on "Perfect Mate", the head of the makeup department Michael Westmore told Grodénchik about a new Star Trek series, that it would include a Ferengi as a series regular and that his agent should check for casting call coming in a few months time. Months later, Grodénchik read for the role of Quark at a large and busy casting call, but did not feel the audition went well and did not expect to hear back, forgetting about it. A few weeks later, at a smaller casting call, he auditioned again, but did not think it went well that time either. As he was waiting disappointed outside the gates of Paramount Studios, Armin Shimerman came over and talked to him. Shimerman had figured out that they were the last two up for the role of Quark, but he also noticed that the script mentioned Quark's nephew Nog and so there was the possibility of there being the part of Nog's father. In the pilot episode, he was hired for one day's work in the role of "Ferengi Pit Boss". Grodénchik was hired for one episode at a time and was contracted on a day-by-day basis for the duration of his role as Rom. He was hired again as a guest star on the fourth episode and was credited as "Rom". He would return to play Rom in thirty-seven episodes.

== Overview ==
In the Star Trek science fiction universe, Rom was born around 2335. Rom does not have the business acumen typically associated with the Ferengi race; he is described as one who "didn't have the 'lobes' for business". He has a knack for fixing things, but until around 2372, he works exclusively as a waiter and stock boy in his brother Quark's bar on Deep Space Nine (DS9). Rom frequently displays a lack of confidence, largely due to Quark's habit of belittling him. There is evidence to suggest that Quark was attempting to protect Rom from inevitable failure by preventing him from venturing into business for himself. Nevertheless, after four years living among Federation and Bajoran citizens on the station, and following his son Nog's admission to Starfleet (which made him very proud), Rom leaves the bar to become an engineer in the Bajoran Militia. However, Rom still frequents the bar and keeps his brother company often, but as a paying customer whom Quark has to respect.

Odo once describes Rom as "an idiot, [who] couldn't fix a straw if it was bent". These opinions are only due to Rom's social ineptitude and meek, almost subservient, demeanor, and stand in contrast to his genius as an engineer. His talents play an important role in the Dominion War. In 2373, Rom designs and distributes a self-replicating minefield that blocks access to the Bajoran wormhole and prevents Dominion reinforcements from entering the Alpha Quadrant for several months.

His first wife, Prinadora, bore his son Nog. She stayed behind on Ferenginar when Rom first came to Deep Space Nine, but the marriage was later dissolved after she and her father stole the bulk of his profits. Rom eventually married Leeta, a Bajoran Dabo girl employed at Quark's bar, after a period of doubt about her love after having been burned in his first marriage.

When Grand Nagus Zek becomes less greedy after coming into contact with the Bajoran prophets, he founds the Ferengi Benevolent Association and appoints Rom chairman ("Prophet Motive"). Acting atypically, Rom takes advantage of the opportunity and embezzles money from the charity.

Throughout his seven years on DS9, Rom undergoes great personal growth as a colleague, parent and in nearly every other aspect of his life and career. He also proves valuable, on several occasions, in helping his people deal with important issues facing their society. Not the least through the influence of his Starfleet neighbours, Rom becomes a more thoughtful and caring individual. In 2375, to the shock of everyone, including Rom himself, Zek appoints Rom to succeed him as Grand Nagus, becoming the new leader of the Ferengi and their economy. Rom's political affiliations are frequently hinted as being left-wing and more liberal than those of his brother. In the episode "Bar Association", he forms a union of the bar staff at Quark's bar and quotes Karl Marx ("Workers of the world, unite! You have nothing to lose but your chains!") as well as demonstrating admiration for Miles O'Brien's ancestor, Sean Aloysius O'Brien, a union leader.

Quark, Rom and Nog do not understand or speak English/Federation Standard, but rather rely on Universal Translators implanted near their ears ("Little Green Men").

Rom's final appearance in the series is "The Dogs of War", the second-to-last episode of the final season.

== Star Trek: Lower Decks ==
By 2381, Grand Nagus Rom and his wife, First Clerk Leeta, instituted numerous reforms such as discouraging the arms trade for a longer term focus on other priorities, such as the hospitality industry. During the preliminary process of having the Ferengi homeworld joining the United Federation of Planets, they test the Federation representation to see if they are gullible by their onerous contract negotiations. After being impressed by Captain Freeman, who successfully traps them into an impossible commitment in writing to bring the Klingon homeworld into the Federation -- thus also proving that the Federation respects the Ferengi's culture -- they agree to sign the original agreement. In addition, Grand Nagus Rom also indulges in baseball with considerable personal equipment for that sport. (Star Trek: Lower Decks: Parth Ferengi's Heart Place)

== Appearances ==
Rom appears in the following episodes:

Season 1

- Emissary, part I
- A Man Alone
- The Nagus
- Vortex

Season 2

- The Homecoming
- The Siege
- Rules of Acquisition
- Necessary Evil
- Rivals

Season 3

- The House of Quark
- Heart of Stone
- Prophet Motive
- Through the Looking Glass
  - Features the only appearance of the Mirror Universe Rom, who is a battle-hardened soldier with the Terran Rebellion.
- Family Business
- Facets

Season 4

- Little Green Men
- Our Man Bashir
- Bar Association
- Body Parts

Season 5

- The Assignment
- The Ascent
- Doctor Bashir, I Presume?
- Ferengi Love Songs
- Call to Arms

Season 6

- Behind the Lines
- Favor the Bold
- Sacrifice of Angels
- You Are Cordially Invited...
- The Magnificent Ferengi
- Profit and Lace

Season 7

- Take Me Out to the Holosuite
- Treachery, Faith, and the Great River
- The Siege of AR-558
- It's Only a Paper Moon
- The Emperor's New Cloak
- The Dogs of War

== Reception and analysis ==
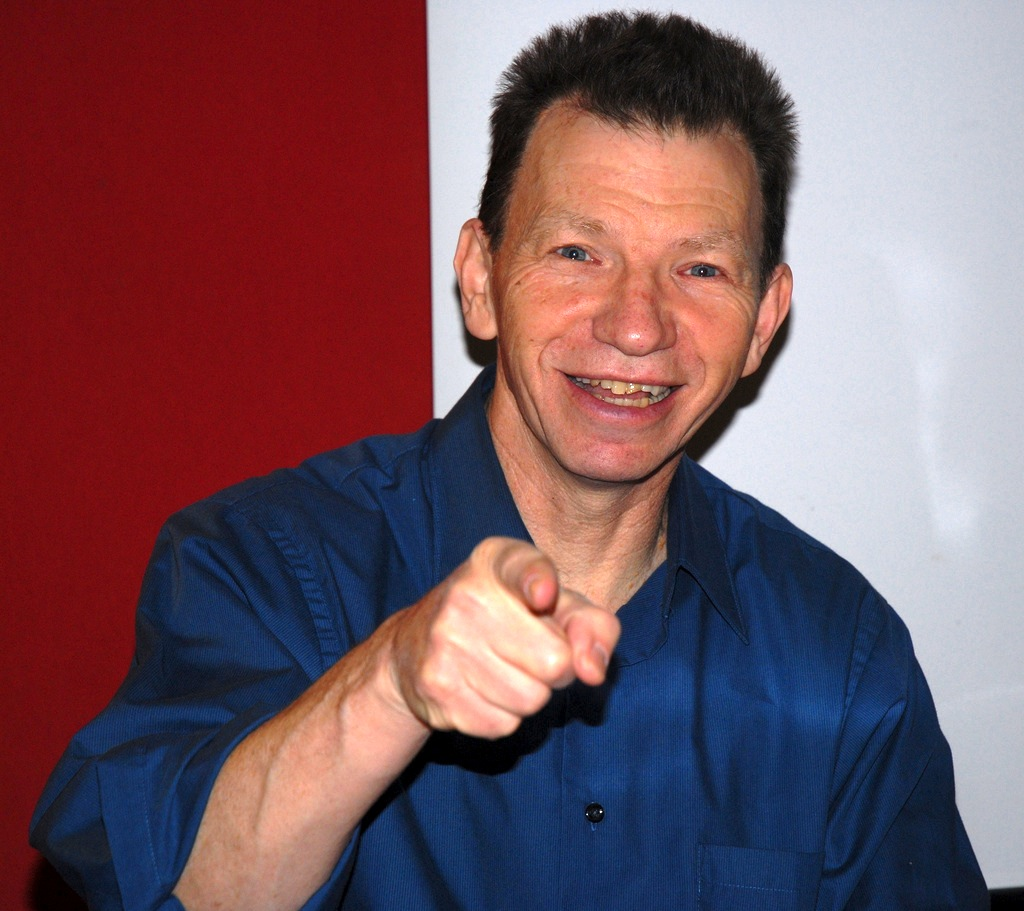
Rom is portrayed by actor Max Grodénchik.

Media scholar Daniel Sutko described Rom as a "lovable buffoon". Though often employed for comic effect, Trekonomics author Manu Saadia deemed Rom central to what he considered the turning point in the "Ferengi arc" in DS9. He suffered because his considerable talents were unsuited for advancing in his society, but "Rom finally breaks free from the ideological constrains of his own culture, centuries upon centuries of traditions and learned behaviors. He discovers that he can actually do that, and that it does not kill him". As the Ferengi are presented as "sort of a parody of the 1990s or 2000s American acquisitive businessman", Rom's great transformation is appropriately exemplified by his formation of a trade union and even quoting verbatim from the Communist Manifesto. Likewise, Uwe Meyer stated that Rom draws on human ideology, both Communist and that of American trade unions, and that he is presented in a likeable way not the least because he is strongly influenced by the values of the Federation. J. Emmett Winn in contrast saw the Ferengi's story arc, in which Rom played a major role, as problematic, as development towards the assimilation of the "other" into the dominant culture, the "right" choice only in the ethnocentric view of that mainstream culture.

Nadja Sennewald analyzed the roles of Rom and Quark in two gender-swapping DS9 episodes. Rom is shown as generally unmasculine, emphasized in the episode "Profit and Lace" by presenting him as an expert for 'female' movement, and much better suited to imitating a woman than Quark, who actually has to fill that role. In "Rules of Acquisition" an envious Rom competes with Pel, a Ferengi woman disguised as a man, for Quark's attention. Rom is again presented as feminized in Ferengi terms, both biologically - he has comparatively small ear-lobes - and culturally - he lacks in business acumen. This three-way-relationship is repeatedly presented in filmic terms as a triangle where Rom is pushed to the side or background. In the end Rom re-establishes his masculinity by one-upping Quark, blackmailing him into transferring his bar to him, and by exposing and driving away Pel.

In 2013, Wired said that Rom was arguably the best character in Star Trek: Deep Space Nine, and even in the entire Star Trek franchise. They praise how Max Grodénchik brought the character to life, presenting a nuanced and layered character over the seven season run. They note how Rom transforms from a comedic sidekick for Quark to a saviour character who was much more important to the series. In 2021, Julian Beauvais, writing for Screen Rant, thought that Rom was an honorable character for trying to take care of his family, using his engineering abilities to help defeat the Dominion during the war, and as Grand Nagus planning to reform Ferengi society to be more egalitarian. In 2015, SyFy rated Rom among the 21 most interesting supporting characters of Star Trek, remarking "he was far from your typical Ferengi" because he was not good at business.

== See also ==
- List of recurring Star Trek: Deep Space Nine characters
