= Max Grodénchik =

American actor (born 1952)

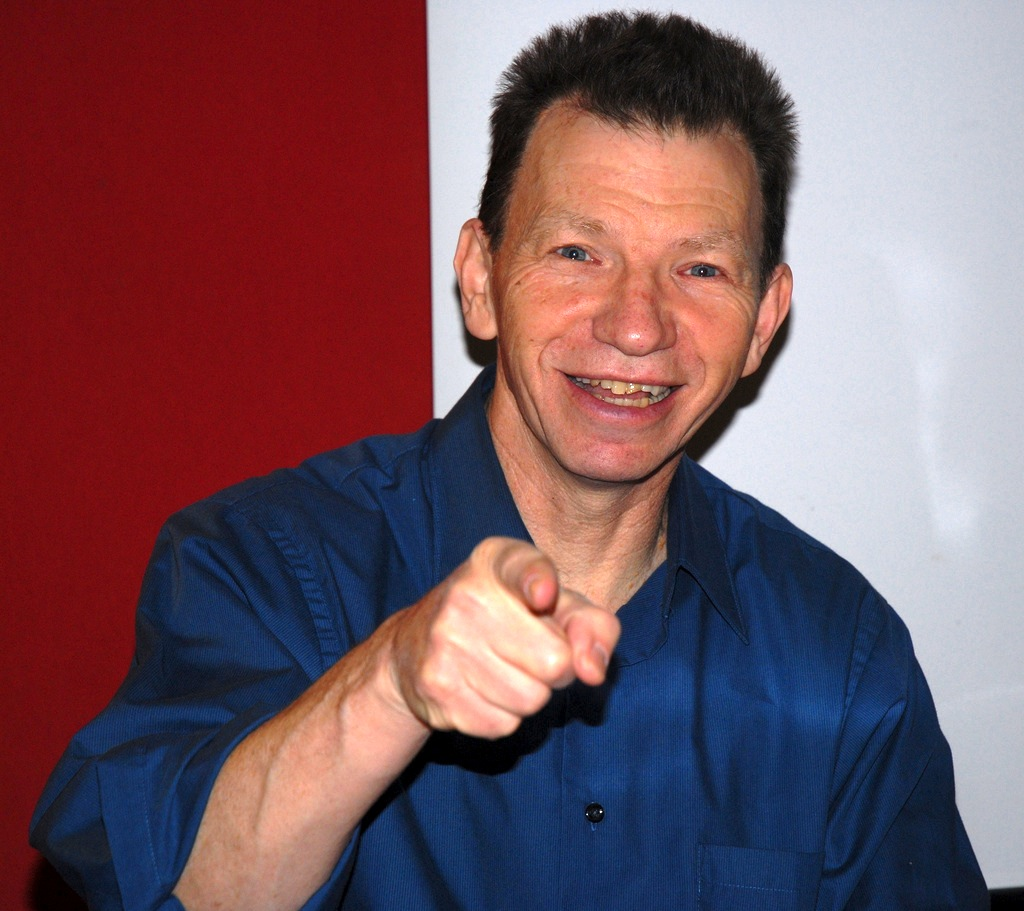
- Grodénchik in 2009
- Born: November 12, 1952 (age 73); New York City, U.S.
- Other name: Michael Grodénchik
- Occupation: Actor
- Years active: 1975–present
- Relatives: Barry Grodenchik (brother)

Max Grodénchik (born November 12, 1952), also known as Michael Grodénchik, is an American stage, film, and television actor, best known for his role as Rom, a recurring character on the television series Star Trek: Deep Space Nine.

== Biography ==
Born to a Jewish family in New York City, Grodénchik worked in theater during the 1980s as Michael Grodénchik, where his performances received notice. Of his 1980 performance in John O'Keefe's All Night Long, Sarasota Herald-Tribune art reviewer Marcia Corbino wrote that Grodénchik was an intriguing actor who had "an enchanting, mobile comic face on which aberrant emotions flicker, spread, retreat, retrench and explode with a single instant."

=== Television ===
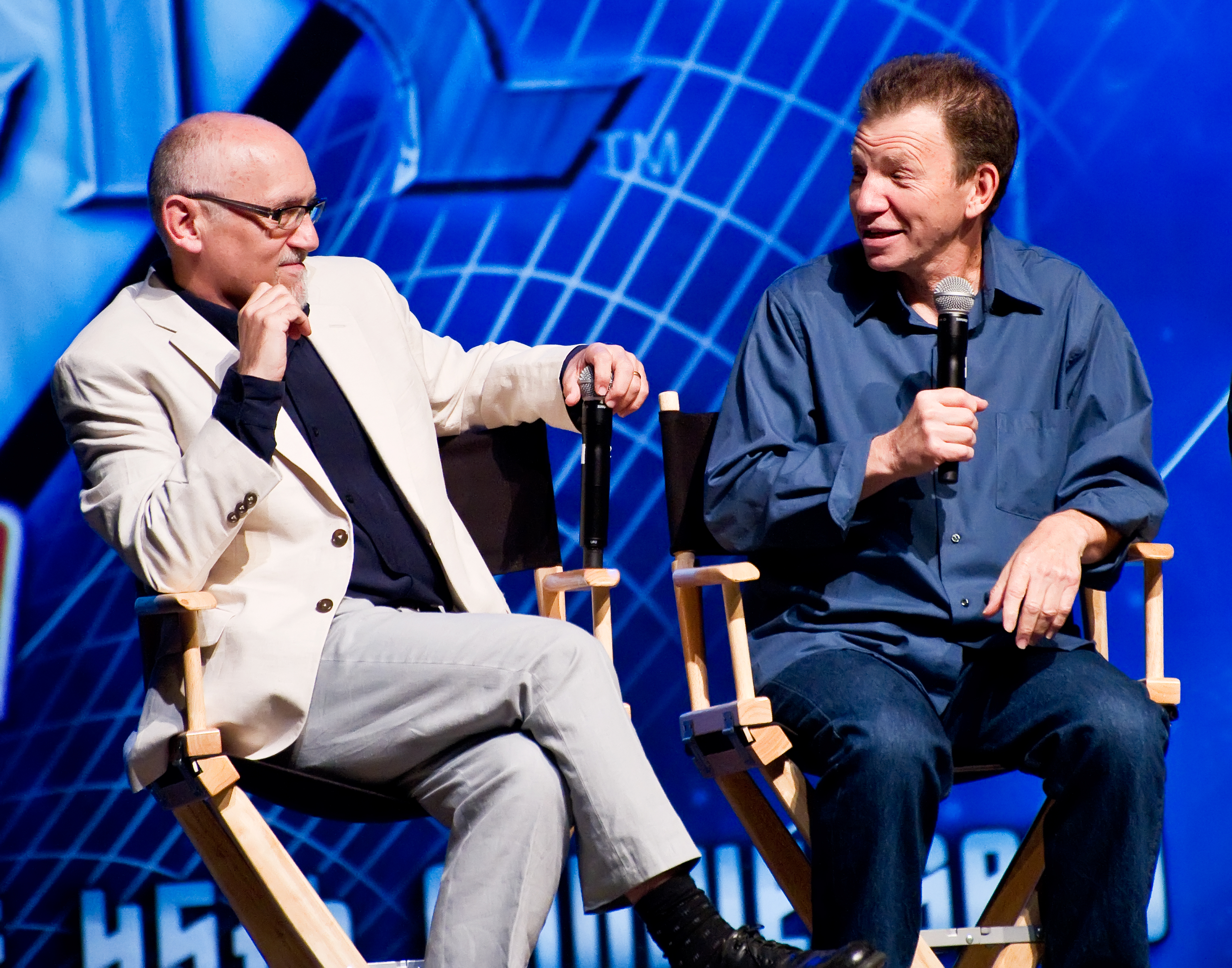
Grodénchik (right) with Star Trek: Deep Space Nine co-star Armin Shimerman (left)

Grodénchik is best known for his portrayal of the character Rom in Star Trek: Deep Space Nine. He had previously auditioned for the role of Rom's brother Quark, but the role was given to Armin Shimerman. Grodénchik was instead hired to play the "Pit Boss" in charge of the gambling at Quark's Bar in the pilot episode, and his role gradually expanded from there. Shimerman and Grodénchik appeared on opposite teams on the short-lived British science fiction game show Space Cadets in 1997.

Grodénchik played baseball in high school, and considered a career in professional baseball before deciding to become an actor. In the Star Trek: Deep Space Nine episode "Take Me Out to the Holosuite", Grodénchik's character Rom is the clumsiest player on his team; during filming of the episode, the naturally right-handed Grodénchik played left-handed, as it was the only way he could convincingly play baseball poorly.

Grodénchik played Sovak and Par Lenor in Star Trek: The Next Generation episodes "Captain's Holiday" and "The Perfect Mate", respectively. He is famous for being an expert on the Rules of Acquisition and can quote them by memory. He played Gint, the writer of those rules and the first Grand Nagus, in a dream sequence involving Quark.

In spring 2007, Grodénchik attended the annual Vulcan Spock Days ceremony.

=== Voice work ===
In summer 2018, Grodénchik reprised the roles of Rom and Sovak in Star Trek Online's Deep Space Nine-themed expansion pack Victory Is Life.

== Personal life and family ==
Grodénchik lives with his wife and daughter in Austria, in the small hamlet of Nußbach in the county Kirchdorf an der Krems.

Grodénchik's brother Barry Grodenchik is a former New York State Assemblyman and Deputy Borough President of Queens.

== Episodes in Star Trek: Deep Space Nine ==
- "Emissary"
- "A Man Alone"
- "The Nagus"
- "Vortex"
- "The Homecoming"
- "Rules of Acquisition"
- "Necessary Evil"
- "The House of Quark"
- "Heart of Stone"
- "Prophet Motive"
- "Through the Looking Glass"
- "Little Green Men"
- "Our Man Bashir"
- "Bar Association"
- "Body Parts"
- "The Assignment"
- "The Ascent"
- "Facets"
- "Doctor Bashir, I Presume?"
- "Ferengi Love Songs"
- "Call to Arms"
- "Behind the Lines"
- "Favor the Bold"
- "Sacrifice of Angels"
- "You Are Cordially Invited..."
- "The Magnificent Ferengi"
- "Profit and Lace"
- "Take Me Out to the Holosuite"
- "Treachery, Faith, and the Great River"
- "The Siege of AR-558"
- "It's Only a Paper Moon"
- "The Emperor's New Cloak"
- "The Dogs of War"
- "Family Business"

== Filmography ==
| Year | Title | Role | Notes |
|---|---|---|---|
| 1981 | Chu Chu and the Philly Flash | Frankie | |
| 1982 | Out | Arnold / Boy | |
| 1989 | Night Court | Norman Snite | Episode: "The Cop and The Lady" (Airdate: October 18, 1989) |
| 1990-1992 | Star Trek: The Next Generation | Sovak | Episode: "Captain's Holiday" (Airdate: April 2, 1990) |
| 1990-1992 | Star Trek: The Next Generation | Par Lenor | Episode: "The Perfect Mate" (Airdate: April 27, 1992) |
| 1991 | Barton Fink | Clapper boy | |
| 1991 | The Rocketeer | Wilmer, Wounded Robber | |
| 1991 | The Gambler Returns: The Luck of the Draw | Bailiff | TV Movie |
| 1992 | Sister Act | Ernie | |
| 1993 | Rising Sun | Club Manager | |
| 1993 | Doorways | Roth | TV Movie |
| 1993-1999 | Star Trek: Deep Space Nine | Rom | 34 episodes |
| 1994 | Tales from the Crypt | Bic | Season 6 Episode 6 "The Bribe" |
| 1995 | Apollo 13 | FIDO Gold | |
| 1995 | Here Come the Munsters | Norman Hyde | TV Movie |
| 1995 | Rumpelstiltskin | Rumpelstiltskin | |
| 1998 | Star Trek: Insurrection | Trill Ensign | scenes deleted |
| 2000 | The Adventures of Rocky and Bullwinkle | Horse Spy | |
| 2003 | ER | Street Vendor | Episode 9:18 Finders Keepers |
| 2003 | Bruce Almighty | Control Room Operator | |
| 2007 | King of California | Leonid | |
| 2011 | CSI | Pawnbroker | Season 11, Episode 21: Cello and Goodbye |
| 2018 | Glossary of Broken Dreams | Biological Male | |
| 2019 | Strawberry Moments | Filmstar | |
| 2020 | Unbelievable!!!!! | Paramedic Yacky | |
| 2021 | Masking Threshold | Officer 2 | |
| 2023 | Star Trek: Lower Decks | Rom (voice) | |
| 2024 | Hacking at Leaves | Uncle Sam | |
