= Family Business (Star Trek: Deep Space Nine) =

- Star Trek: Deep Space Nine episode
- Episode no.: Season 3 Episode 23
- Directed by: René Auberjonois
- Written by: Ira Steven Behr; Robert Hewitt Wolfe
- Production code: 469
- Original air date: May 15, 1995

Guest appearances
- Jeffrey Combs as Brunt; Andrea Martin as Ishka; Max Grodénchik as Rom; Penny Johnson as Kasidy Yates

Episode chronology
← Previous "Explorers"	Next → "Shakaar"
- Star Trek: Deep Space Nine season 3

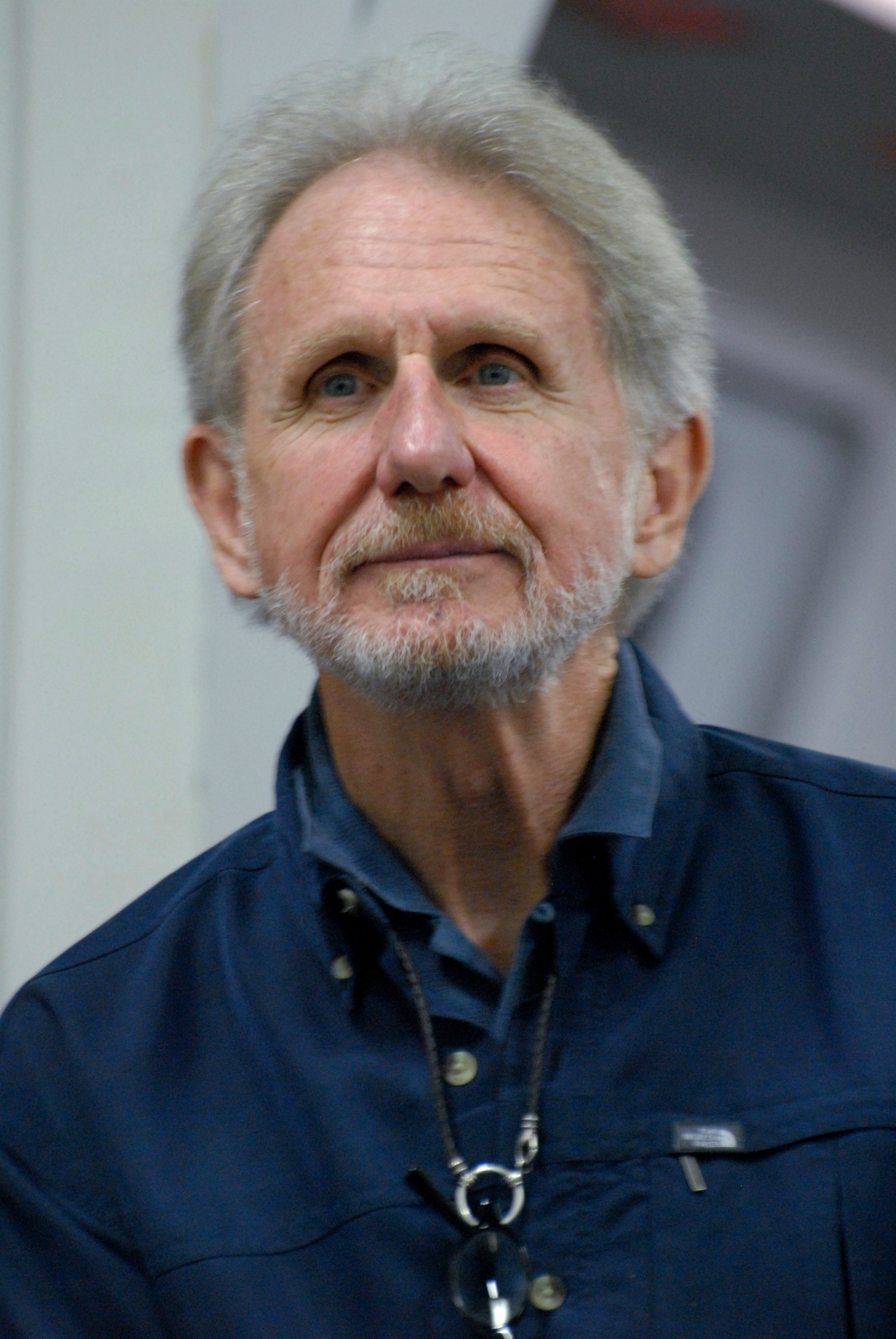
René Auberjonois directs this episode, as well as playing the character Odo

"Family Business" is the 69th episode of the television series Star Trek: Deep Space Nine, the 23rd episode of the third season. It was written by Ira Steven Behr and Robert Hewitt Wolfe, and directed by Rene Auberjonois. The episode had Nielsen ratings of 6.9 points when it was first broadcast.

Set in the 24th century, the series follows the adventures of the crew of the space station Deep Space Nine. This episode centers on the profit-seeking aliens known as the Ferengi, as Deep Space Nine's Ferengi bartender Quark returns home to the planet Ferenginar to deal with his mother's violation of the misogynist precepts of Ferengi culture.

The episode marks the first appearance of the planet Ferenginar in a Star Trek episode, as well as the debuts of three recurring characters: Quark's mother Ishka (played by special guest star Andrea Martin), Liquidator Brunt of the Ferengi Commerce Authority (Jeffrey Combs) and freighter captain Kasidy Yates (Penny Johnson Jerald). Max Grodénchik appears in his recurring role as Quark's brother Rom.

== Plot ==
Brunt, an agent of the Ferengi Commerce Authority (FCA), serves Quark with a notice that his mother, Ishka, is charged with earning profit – an illegal activity for Ferengi women. As the family's eldest male, Quark is held responsible. He and his brother Rom return to their childhood home on Ferenginar, where they are surprised to find Ishka wearing clothes, which is also illegal for Ferengi women. Brunt gives Quark three days to get his mother to sign a confession.

Later, Ishka confirms that she earned three bars of gold-pressed latinum by investing a portion of the monthly stipend she receives from Quark; but she refuses to confess. Ishka tells Rom that this is a matter of pride, and proof that she is just as capable of earning profit as a man. Quark discovers that Ishka has actually been conducting business transactions under dozens of aliases, earning much more than just three bars of latinum. Even if Quark sells everything he owns, he will be unable to pay back what his mother has earned.

Quark confronts Ishka, who accuses him of being jealous of her financial acumen – just like his deceased father, Keldar. With that, an infuriated Quark decides to turn in Ishka to the FCA. Rom tries to stop him and agrees with Ishka, angering Quark further, and the conversation deteriorates into a brawl. Ishka interrupts the fight and allows Quark to leave to report her transactions.

Quark waits outside Brunt's office when Rom rushes in with the news that Ishka will split her profits with Quark. Quark hurries home to accept Ishka's offer, only to learn that Rom, fed up with Quark and Ishka's bickering, made up the story to force a conversation between them. Realizing that Rom is right and that their bickering has gone too far, Quark and Ishka relent. Ishka tells Quark that he gets his business acumen from her, not his father; but since she loves him and he is her son, she will sign the confession and give back the money. Later, she pays her reparations to Brunt, and a relieved Quark says his goodbyes and leaves. Now alone with Rom, Ishka reveals that she has outsmarted Quark and the Ferengi government yet again – by giving up only a third of her profits.

In a side plot, Deep Space Nine's commander Benjamin Sisko is set up on a date with freighter captain Kasidy Yates by his son Jake. Although things are awkward at first, the two soon discover they share a mutual love of baseball.

== Reception ==
Zack Handlen of The A.V. Club says that perhaps the most notable thing about the episode is that it is a Ferengi themed episode that isn't played for laughs. He calls it "a well-built, surprisingly heartfelt episode about the stresses of family, cultural bigotry, and the glories of baseball" and that it "both demonstrates the confidence of the show’s creative team and cast when it comes to the stories they want to tell, and the art with which they tell them." Keith DeCandido of Tor.com rated the episode eight out of ten.

== Releases ==
This episode was released on VHS video tape paired with "Shakaar" by Paramount Home Video.

This episode was released on October 2, 1998 in Japan as part of the half-season LaserDisc box set 3rd Season Vol. 2. The format included both English and Japanese audio tracks, as well as Japanese captions.

The episode was released on June 3, 2003 in North America as part of the season 3 DVD box set.
