= Ferengi =

Fictional Star Trek species

- Star Trek race
- Three Ferengi in the Star Trek: The Next Generation episode "The Price".
- Created by: Gene Roddenberry; Herbert Wright

In-universe information
- Quadrant: Alpha
- Home world: Ferenginar

The Ferengi (/fəˈrɛŋɡi/) are a fictional extraterrestrial species in the American science fiction franchise Star Trek. They were devised in 1987 for the series Star Trek: The Next Generation, played a prominent role in the following series Star Trek: Deep Space Nine, and have made brief appearances in subsequent series such as Star Trek: Voyager, Star Trek: Enterprise, Star Trek: Discovery, Star Trek: Lower Decks and Star Trek: Picard.

When launching Star Trek: The Next Generation in 1987, Gene Roddenberry and the show's writers decided to introduce a new alien species to serve as antagonists for the crew of the USS Enterprise-D. The Ferengi first appeared in "The Last Outpost", the show's fourth episode, which was set in the year 2364. The writers decided that the Ferengi ultimately failed to appear sufficiently menacing, instead replacing them with the Romulans and Borg as primary antagonists. Throughout the rest of the series, Ferengi characters were primarily used for comedic effect.

When creating Star Trek: Deep Space Nine, the show's writers decided to introduce the Ferengi bartender Quark (Armin Shimerman) as a major character, and subsequently his brother Rom (Max Grodénchik) and nephew Nog (Aron Eisenberg) as recurring characters, again frequently using them for comedic purposes.

Ferengi culture, especially as portrayed on Deep Space Nine, is depicted as hyper-capitalistic, focused on the acquisition of profit as the highest goal. Deep Space Nine writers have described how they saw the Ferengi as a satirical presentation of 20th century humans. Ferengi rules like "Profit is its own reward" or "Ask not what your profits can do for you, but what you can do for your profits" portray a caricature of an extreme capitalist.

== Name ==
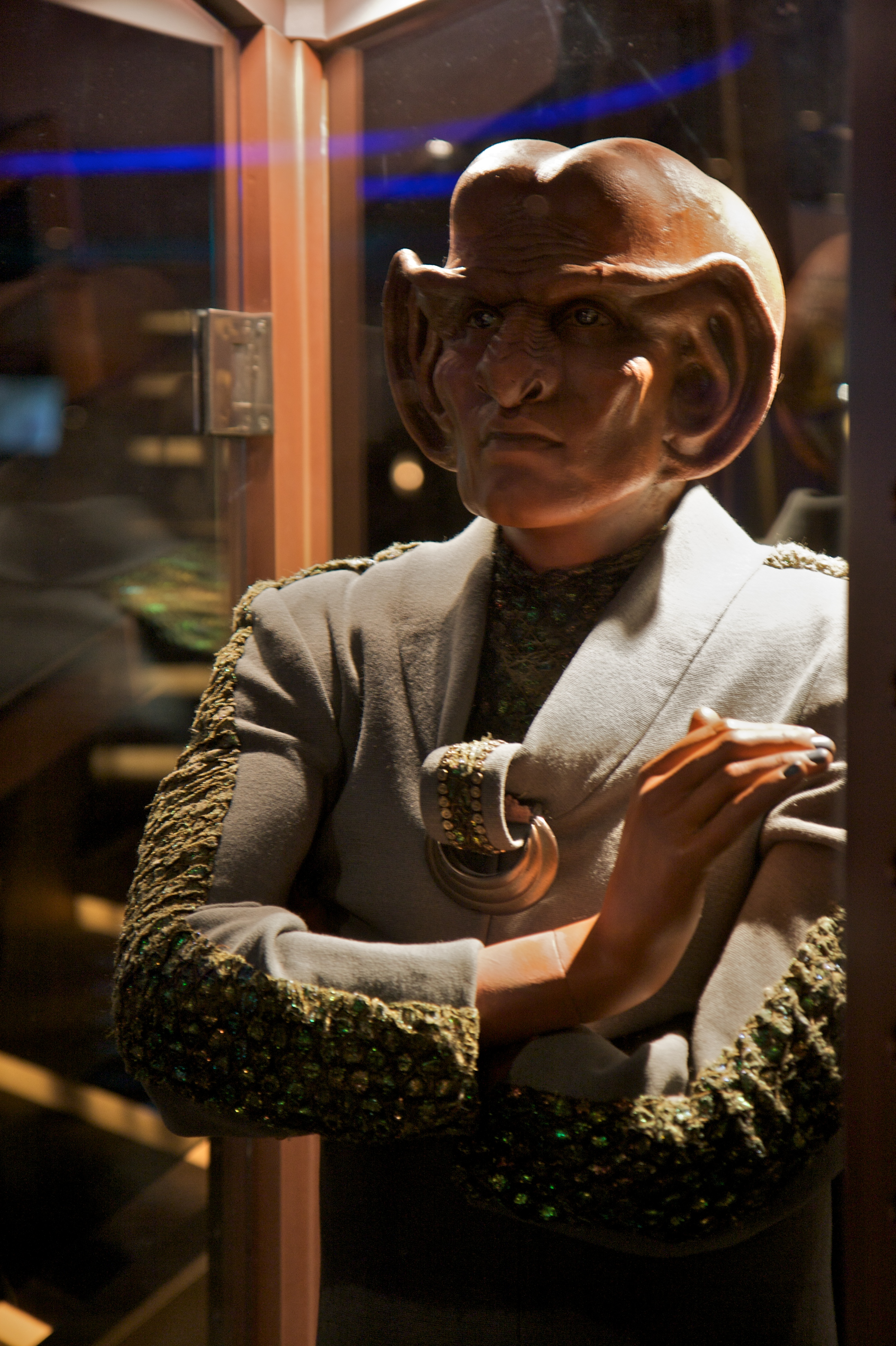
Ferengi makeup design and uniform from Star Trek: The Experience

The name Ferengi was coined based on the originally Persian Farangi, a term used in various languages throughout Asia and Ethiopia meaning "foreigners" or "Europeans", itself descending from the word farang which referred specifically to Franks and gradually expanded in meaning. The variant "firangi" has entered South Asian English through Hindi.

== History ==
=== Star Trek: The Next Generation ===
While preparing scripts for the first season of Star Trek: The Next Generation, the idea of the Ferengi was devised by Gene Roddenberry and Herbert Wright. The new alien species initially appeared in the first season's fourth episode, "The Last Outpost", which was based on a story by Richard Krzemien and a teleplay by Wright. In this story, the USS Enterprise-D—whose crew are the main protagonists of the series—makes first contact with the Ferengi while pursuing one of their vessels, which has stolen a T-9 energy converter. Both ships are immobilized over an unknown planet, leading both to send away parties to investigate, where they encounter each other. One of the actors who played a Ferengi in "The Last Outpost", Armin Shimerman, would go on to play a Ferengi again in the later episode "Peak Performance" before being cast as the Ferengi bartender Quark in Star Trek: Deep Space Nine.

The Ferengi outfits designed for "The Last Outpost" featured fur wrap-arounds. As weapons, they were given blue whips that fired energy bolts when cracked; these were subsequently dropped from the series and not used in later depictions of the species. Mike Okuda designed the Ferengi insignia to present the idea of "dog eat dog". It was colored green because of that color's associations with greed, envy, and money. The Ferengi ship featured in the episode was designed by Andy Probert, who used a horseshoe crab on Wright's desk as inspiration, with the model then being constructed by Greg Jein.

The Ferengi were reused for the season's ninth episode, "The Battle", based on a story by Larry Forrester that Wright converted into a teleplay. This episode was first aired in November 1987. In it, a Ferengi called DaiMon Bok gives the Enterprise Captain Jean-Luc Picard (Patrick Stewart) the derelict ship that the latter once captained, the Stargazer. Over the course of the episode, it is revealed that this is part of Bok's plan for vengeance, for he holds Picard responsible for the death of his son many years before. Forrester's first plot outline had featured various scenes aboard the Ferengi spaceship, but these did not make it into the episode. Series writer Rick Berman later noted that because of their "silliness quotient", the Ferengi became "a disappointment as a major adversary".

For the second-season episode "Peak Performance", written by David Kemper and directed by Robert Scheerer, the Enterprise is depicted encountering a hostile Ferengi ship while engaging in a practice exercise. The Ferengi uniform was revised for this episode, and new collar pips were added to designate their differing ranks. The season three episode "The Price", which was written by Hannah Louise Shearer, directed by Robert Scheerer, and first aired in November 1989, also included Ferengi characters. In it, two Ferengi delegates compete against their Federation counterparts to gain access to a newly discovered stable wormhole; later in the episode, it is revealed that the wormhole was not really stable and the Ferengi get stuck on the other side of it, in a distant part of the galaxy. "The Price" is the first episode in which a Ferengi starship was referred to as a "marauder".

=== Star Trek: Deep Space Nine ===
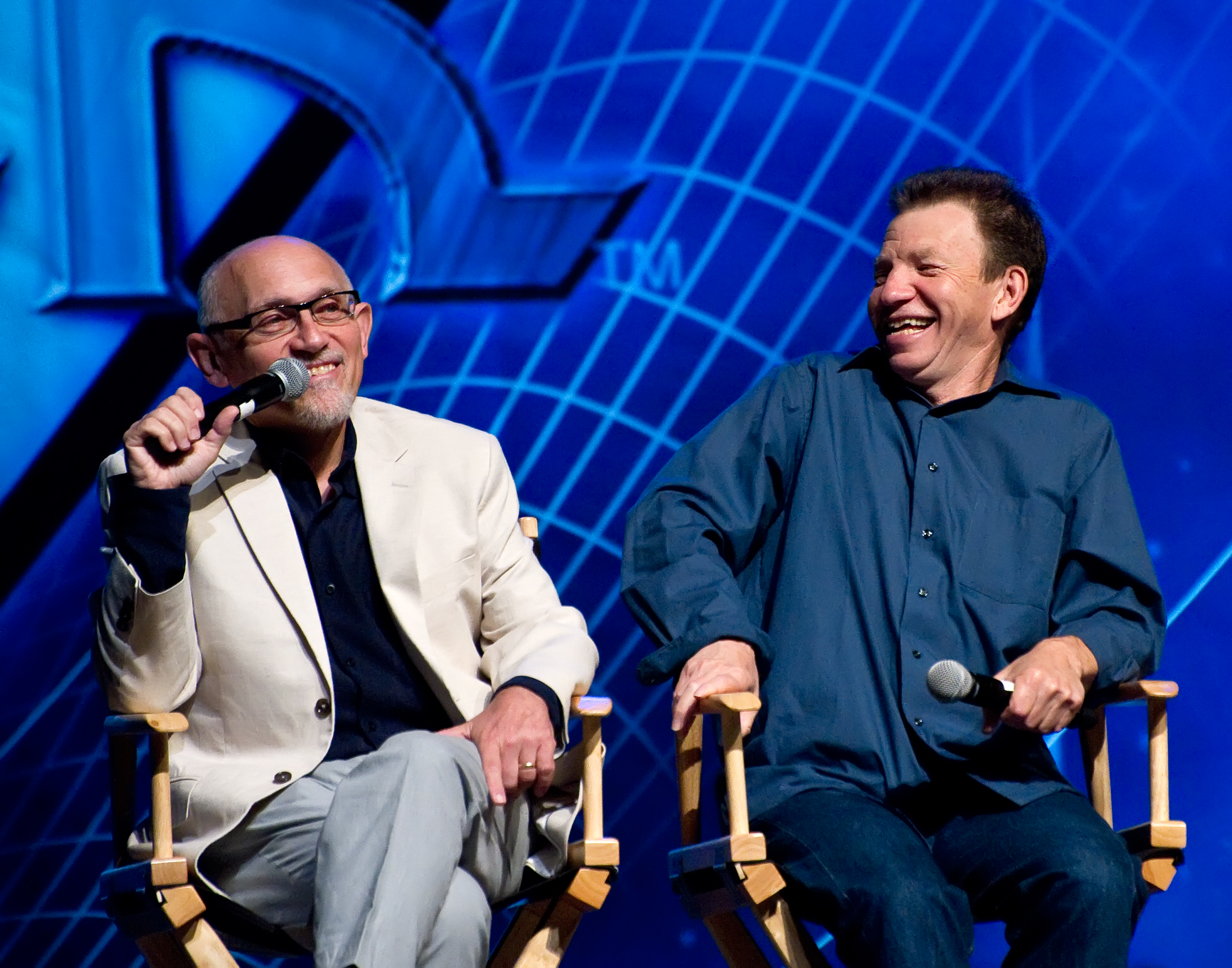
Armin Shimerman (left) played Quark; Max Grodénchik (right) played Rom.

When the writers were putting together the premise of Star Trek: Deep Space Nine, they decided to introduce a recurring Ferengi character who would inhabit the space station Deep Space Nine that was the main setting for the show. The show's co-creator, Michael Piller, later noted that: "It was clear to me that having a Ferengi aboard Deep Space 9 would provide the show with instant humor and built-in conflict with the Federation guy in charge of the station". The show's creators developed the character of Quark, a Ferengi bartender who would, according to Piller, be "a constant thorn in the side of law and order, but who has a sense of humor about it. He'd be someone who could obviously throw lots of story dynamics into play." Piller and the others consciously wanted to play the Quark character off against the station constable, Odo (René Auberjonois); according to Piller, "the idea of Odo and Quark being at loggerheads was there from day one".

Through the character of Quark and his family, Deep Space Nine developed the culture and politics of the Ferengi in some detail. Episodes of the series portray the Ferengi's hyper-capitalistic emphasis on profit and sexist social norms (at the beginning of the series, Ferengi females are not permitted to earn profit or even wear clothing), and the society's gradual evolution away from those norms as, for example, Quark's mother becomes a respected businesswoman and Quark comes to tolerate his employees forming a union.

In the third season of Deep Space Nine, Quark's nephew Nog becomes the first Ferengi to join Starfleet, the military and exploration arm of the United Federation of Planets. This development prompted discussions on electronic mailing lists devoted to Star Trek. Various commentators suggested that, given how Nog had behaved in previous episodes, it was surprising that Starfleet would take him on. They suggested that this might indicate that Starfleet had some form of affirmative action policy to benefit species not presently represented in Starfleet. Other online commentators argued that this viewpoint was racist, and that Nog would have been accepted as a Starfleet cadet because he was qualified, not because of his racial identity.

=== Star Trek: Voyager ===
In the third-season episode "False Profits", USS Voyager encounters the two Ferengi from "The Price", who have been conning a primitive culture that they encountered, while stranded in the Delta Quadrant. When Voyager attempts to use the Barzan wormhole to return home, the Ferengi escape, but accidentally destabilize the wormhole on both ends in the process. The Ferengi shuttle is sucked in and becomes lost in space again while Voyager remains stranded in the Delta Quadrant.

=== Star Trek: Lower Decks ===
By 2381, the progressive reforms of Grand Nagus Rom and his wife First Clerk Leeta had taken root in Ferengi society with the arms trade being discouraged with the greater longer-term economic benefits of more benign industries, such as hospitality, being encouraged. As such, Ferenginar is in the process of joining the United Federation of Planets.

=== Star Trek: Prodigy ===
Dal R'El was raised by a Ferengi named Nandi who used the young alien in her cons before selling him off. Nandi cons the Protostar crew into helping her steal a valuable crystal, although they manage to get it back, and she steals their chimeriumin order to power her cloaking device.

The Ferengi are amongst those who come to Starfleet's aid during the living construct crisis. This event takes place in 2384, and the Ferengi have not yet fully joined the Federation despite having begun the process as they are still described as only non-Federation allies.

=== Star Trek: Discovery ===
The Ferengi are amongst the races serving in Starfleet in the 32nd century. In addition, the USS Nog is named after the young Ferengi officer Nog from Deep Space Nine.

== Attributes ==
=== Culture ===
Ferengi culture is depicted, especially on Deep Space Nine, as focused on the acquisition of profit as the highest goal. Many episodes portray this as taken to a comical extreme, as, for example, Ferengi prayer involves paying bribes to the gods, and Ferengi funeral rites involve auctioning off the deceased's remains. Ferengi characters frequently quote the "Rules of Acquisition", a collection of proverbs that are said to govern Ferengi business practices (such as "Never place friendship above profit"); a compilation of these Rules was published by Deep Space Nine showrunner Ira Steven Behr. Violations of economic norms such as abrogating contracts between fellow Ferengi or fraudulently taking advantage of business discounts are considered serious offences and subject to harsh punishments.

The extreme sexism of Ferengi society is shown in early seasons of Deep Space Nine where Ferengi females are not permitted to earn profit, travel, or even wear clothing. A long-running plot thread on DS9 features Ferengi society's gradual evolution away from these practices, especially as Quark's mother Ishka establishes herself as a respected businesswoman and financial advisor. Evidently, the fact that granting full societal and economic rights to females would mean a dramatic expansion of business and investment opportunities proved persuasive to the Ferengi government. By 2380, Grand Nagus' reforms had taken effect, as seen in the acceptance of clothing for females.

Despite their greed and sexism, in their own way the Ferengi are actually quite a peaceful and tolerant race. At least according to Quark, Ferengi history contains nothing comparable to the racism and world wars found in human history. Given that one customer's money is as valuable as the next's, it makes no sense to Ferengi to refuse to interact with those different from them: even Quark of all people feels the discrimination Odo faces for being a changeling is repugnant. While they have hired mercenaries for private contracts, the Ferengi Alliance as a whole has never fought a major interstellar war - instead preferring to apply economic pressure on their rivals until they're willing to negotiate.

=== Biology and appearance ===
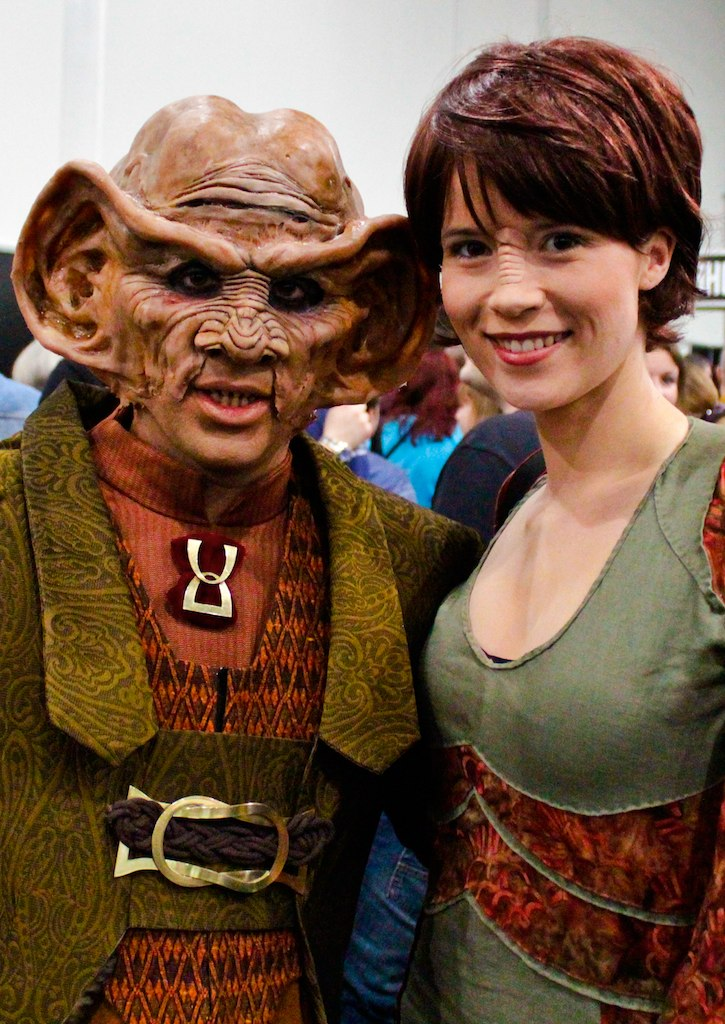
A cosplayer dressed as a Ferengi (left) with another dressed as a Bajoran

The Ferengi were first designed by Andrew Probert and later refined and produced by Michael Westmore.

The most prominent feature in Ferengi design is their large ear lobes. Ferengi experience sexual stimulation when their lobes are rubbed – an act called "oo-mox". Ferengi females allegedly have smaller lobes, but the only female Ferengi characters shown in the series were Pel and Ishka. Betazoids are incapable of reading Ferengi emotions. The focus on ears extends to figures of speech (i.e. "not having the lobes" to indicate a lack of courage) and to health problems (i.e. an ear infection proving fatal).

=== Homeworld ===
The Ferengi home planet, Ferenginar, is introduced in the Star Trek: Deep Space Nine episode "Family Business". Ferenginar experiences near-constant torrential rain; consequently, the Ferengi language has 178 different words for rain (and none for "crisp").

=== Spacecraft ===
A Ferengi shuttlecraft was introduced in the episode "The Price". It was also seen in "Little Green Men" as a spacecraft used by Quark. The studio model for VFX was auctioned by Christie's for over US$8,000 in 2006. There is a larger Ferengi spaceship called the Marauder. The Marauder was designed by Andrew Probert, and the model was built by Greg Jein; the studio model was constructed of resin, fiberglass, and aluminum.

== Reception ==
In 2017, Syfy rated the Ferengi one of the top eleven most bizarre aliens of Star Trek: The Next Generation.

In 2017, Den of Geek ranked the Ferengi the eighth best aliens of the Star Trek franchise, in between Andorians and Romulans.

Examples of well-received Ferengi-focused episodes in Star Trek: Deep Space Nine include "Little Green Men", in which Ferengi characters travel back in time to the 1940s and become the alien invaders in the Roswell UFO incident, and "The Magnificent Ferengi", in which a group of Ferengi characters team up to rescue Quark's mother when she is captured by an enemy empire.

=== Comparisons with antisemitic stereotypes ===
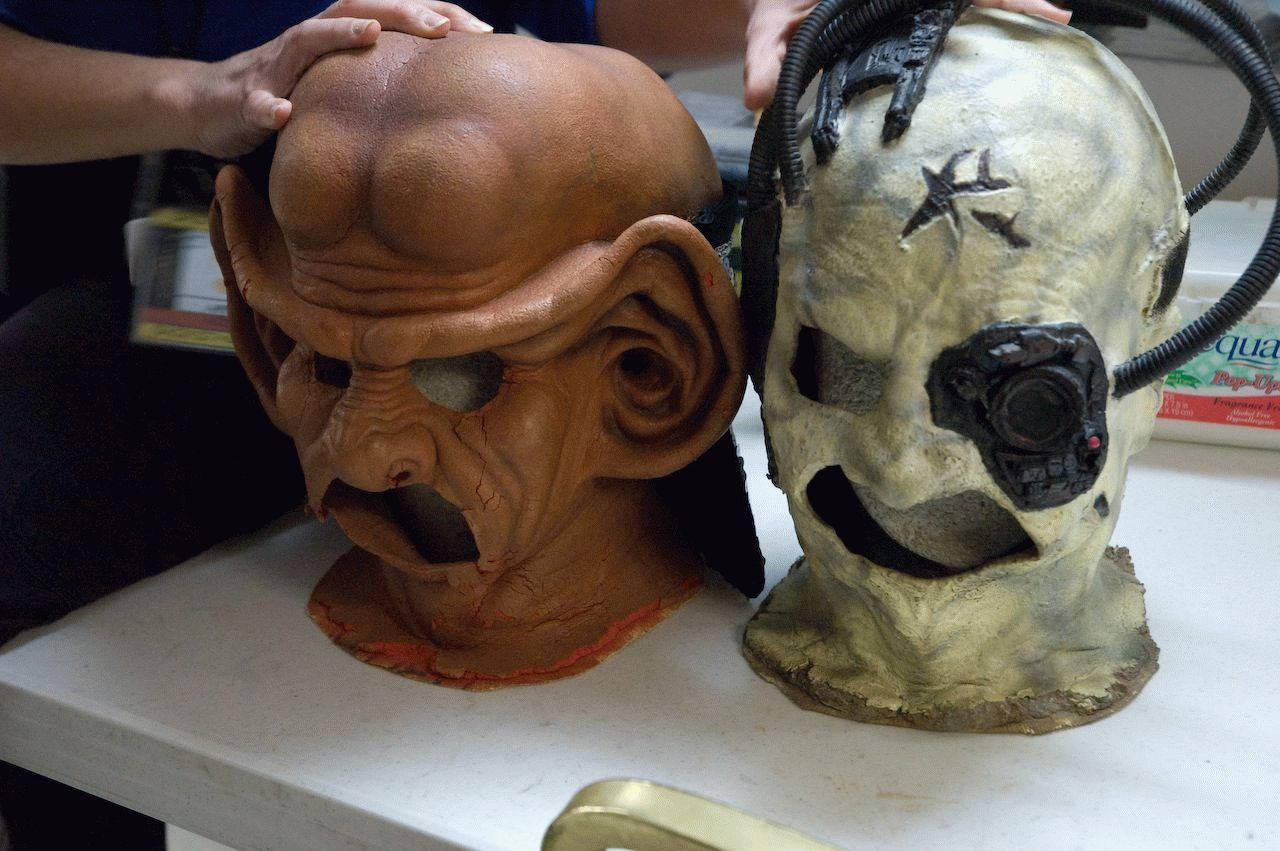
A Ferengi mask, alongside one of the Borg

Various critics, such as religious studies scholar Ross Shepard Kraemer, compare Ferengi religious texts, social laws, and afterlife beliefs to traditional Judaism. The chapter "What happens when you die?" of the book "Religions of Star Trek" examines Ferengi funerary practices, comparing their theology with traditional Western concepts of divine judgement.

In his article "Science fiction's antisemitism problem" historian Paul Sturtevant argues that the Ferengi "may have been unwittingly developed from caricatures drawn from pervasive stereotypes about Jews". During the 1990s, these stereotypes were discussed on electronic mailing lists devoted to the franchise, with some commentators arguing that there were parallels and others objecting to the comparison. In his 2007 critique of The Next Generation for the National Review, the commentator Jonah Goldberg described the Ferengi as "runaway capitalists with bullwhips who looked like a mix between Nazi caricatures of Jews and the original Nosferatu." Ross S. Kraemer wrote that "Ferengi religion seems almost a parody, perhaps of traditional Judaism." Kraemer analyses how different species and human traditions within the Star Trek universe confront death, contrasting secular humanism with spiritual concepts of the soul and eternal life.

Armin Shimerman addressed the issue when asked at a question-and-answer session at a Star Trek convention. He stated that:

In America, people ask "Do the Ferengi represent Jews?" In England, they ask "Do the Ferengi represent the Irish?" In Australia, they ask if the Ferengi represent the Chinese ... The Ferengi represent the outcast ... it's the person who lives among us that we don't fully understand.

Robert Hewitt Wolfe, writer for Deep Space Nine, has stated that the creative team (several of whom were Jewish) were aware at the time that many already saw the Ferengi as Jewish stereotypes, but that they attempted to mitigate this, both through characterization of Ferengi characters as individuals, and through incorporating aspects of multiple human cultures into Ferengi culture.
