= Robert Hewitt Wolfe =

American screenwriter

- Born: October 28, 1964 (age 61); Waterbury, Connecticut, U.S.
- Education: University of California, Los Angeles
- Occupations: Television producer, screenwriter
- Years active: 1992–present
- Spouse: Celeste
- Website: http://www.roberthwolfe.com

Robert Hewitt Wolfe (born 1964) is an American television producer and screenwriter. He is best known for his work as a writer on Star Trek: Deep Space Nine and for developing and producing the series Gene Roddenberry's Andromeda.

== Early life ==
Wolfe was born in Waterbury, Connecticut. He was a writer from an early age. He attempted but did not complete several novels between the ages of ten and twenty. He attended St. Ignatius College Preparatory. He turned to film and television writing in college.

Wolfe graduated from UCLA, receiving a bachelor's degree in Film and Television and a MFA in Screenwriting. His first screenplay, Paper Dragons, placed second in the prestigious Goldwyn awards.

== Television career ==
=== Star Trek series ===
In 1992, Wolfe sold the story for "A Fistful of Datas" to the series Star Trek: The Next Generation. His writing of the screenplay for the episode secured him a place on the creative staff of the series Star Trek: Deep Space Nine, which made its debut in the following year.

Wolfe worked on DS9 for five years, under the supervision of showrunners Michael Piller and Ira Steven Behr. During this time, he wrote or co-wrote over thirty episodes in a wide range of styles. These included action-packed episodes with high story-arc importance such as "The Way of the Warrior" and "Call to Arms"; dramatic episodes that focused on character development such as "The Wire" and "Hard Time"; and comedies such as "Family Business" and "Little Green Men".

=== Andromeda ===
In 1999, working from notes by Gene Roddenberry, Wolfe developed the syndicated series Gene Roddenberry's Andromeda. The series premiered in the fall of 2000 as the number one original hour in syndication, a position it held for most of its five-year run.

Wolfe served as head writer and co-executive producer on Andromeda for its first two seasons. During this time, the series was nominated for two Saturn Awards for Best Syndicated Series and for a Leo Award for Best Dramatic Series.

During the production of the second season, Wolfe claims that he and the studio quarreled over the non-episodic nature of the show and the studio's requests for "more aliens, more space battles, and less internal conflict," eventually resulting in his departure. Actor Kevin Sorbo confirmed the statements, saying that Wolfe, "is a genius, but was developing stories that were too complicated."

=== SyFy ===
Wolfe was an executive producer on the television series The Dresden Files, along with David Simkins, Nicolas Cage, and others. Wolfe and Hans Beimler wrote the screenplay for the pilot and developed the series, which was based on the books by Jim Butcher. It was a production of Lions Gate Television and Saturn Films. It premiered on January 21, 2007, on the Sci Fi Channel. Wolfe subsequently wrote or the teleplays for some episodes in the series.

He is an executive producer on the SyFy series Alphas which premiered in 2011. He also wrote several of the Alphas episodes in 2011 and 2012.

=== TV movies ===
In the period that followed his departure from Deep Space Nine, Wolfe wrote several television pilots. One of these, Futuresport, was released in 1998 as an ABC TV movie starring Dean Cain and Wesley Snipes.

Wolfe teamed up with Hans Beimler to write the 2006 TV movie Scarlett.

Wolfe co-wrote the teleplay for 2010's Riverworld. The "epic adventure" was based on the books by Philip José Farmer. The 178-minute TV movie was released on the Sci Fi Channel.

=== Other television work ===
Wolfe has also written freelance scripts for The Dead Zone and UPN's revival of The Twilight Zone.

In 2004, he served as a consulting producer and writer on the first and fourth seasons of The 4400 on USA Network, helping launch the successful series.

It was announced in 2012 that Wolfe was developing a series titled Defender from Universal Cable Productions, set on the Starship Defender. In 2014, Wolfe was hired as a co-executive producer on The CW show Star-Crossed.

Wolfe wrote sixteen episodes of the CBS drama Elementary over five seasons, from 2014 to 2019. Wolfe served as a Consulting Producer for the Fox Drama Prodigal Son in 2019–2020.

== Film career ==
Wolfe has written several unproduced features. These include Splicers for 20th Century Fox and Zero Gee for John Woo and Terrance Chang's Lion Rock Productions.

== Personal life ==
As of 2022, he lives in Los Angeles, California, with his wife Celeste and dog Mochi.
