= Quark (Star Trek) =

Fictional character from Star Trek: Deep Space Nine

- Star Trek character
- First appearance: "Emissary"; Star Trek: Deep Space Nine; 1993
- Last appearance: "Hear All, Trust Nothing"; Star Trek: Lower Decks; 2022
- Portrayed by: Armin Shimerman

In-universe information
- Species: Ferengi
- Affiliation: Ferengi Alliance
- Posting: Deep Space Nine Resident
- Position: Barkeep Grand Nagus (former) Cook (former)
- Spouse: Grilka (divorced)

Quark is a fictional character in the American television series Star Trek: Deep Space Nine. He was played by Armin Shimerman and is a member of the extraterrestrial race known as the Ferengi, who are stereotypically capitalist and motivated only by profit.

== Depiction ==
Quark was introduced on television in 1993, in the two-part Star Trek: Deep Space Nine premiere "Emissary".

Talking about his depiction of Quark, Shimerman said the character developed significantly during the start of the sixth season of Deep Space Nine, during a story arc in which the Dominion took control of the Deep Space Nine station:

He soon learns that although things may appear to be good under Dominion rule and life is pretty good, they still don't have liberty, and you've got to fight for it. Quark was one of those deluded people who thought, 'This is fine — we all get to do what we want to do,' and didn't realize that liberty was more important than creature comforts. ... Like any Everyman character in literature, Quark has to go through some turmoil before he realizes the truth.

Max Grodénchik, who was cast as Quark's brother Rom, originally auditioned for the role of Quark; he later said, "I got to know Armin a bit during the audition process. He had so much more history with the show."

Karen Westerfield did the makeup for Quark during all of Star Trek: Deep Space Nine. Shimerman said, "I always say that Karen helped create Quark as much as I did". He also said of Westerfield, "It was her idea to put the maroon shading around my eyes. The makeup accented the eyes, so you could see the eyes better. The other Ferengi characters didn't have that, and it made a huge difference."

=== Career ===
Before opening a bar, known as "Quark's Bar, Grill, Gaming House and Holosuite Arcade", Quark served as a cook aboard a Ferengi freighter for eight years, according to the Star Trek: Deep Space Nine episode "Profit and Loss". According to his own admission, he was rising to the top of the Ferengi business world as an assistant to the Grand Nagus until he made the mistake of having sex with his boss's sister which resulted in him becoming a cook. He came to the station while it was named Terok Nor during the Cardassian occupation of Bajor. Originally, Quark admired the Cardassian race for their version of morality, but later he seemed to take pity on the downtrodden Bajoran people, selling them food and equipment just above cost, which could have gotten him into serious trouble if the Cardassians had found out. When the station changed hands at the end of the occupation, he decided to leave. Commander Sisko, feeling that Quark's Bar (which offered holosuites and gambling) would encourage commercial tourism to boost the station's economy, extorted Quark into staying, using Quark's nephew Nog as a bargaining chip, in the Deep Space Nine pilot episode, "Emissary."

Quark engages in a variety of shady deals, but neither Sisko nor Odo, Quark's nominal nemesis and head of station security, take serious action against him, partially because his value outweighs his numerous illegal activities, which for the most part harm no one. Furthermore, the station's status as, technically, the property of Bajor and thus only nominally a Federation station, sometimes prevented Sisko from prosecuting Quark to the full extent of Federation law; Sisko was not allowed such latitude with criminals who were also Federation citizens, such as his own lover, Kasidy Yates, whom Sisko was once obliged to arrest for dealing in illicit replicators when, on the same occasion, he was obliged to allow Quark relative amnesty for dealing in illicit weapons. In the episode "Business as Usual", Sisko admits that he had "cut [Quark] a lot of slack in the past [and] even looked away once or twice when [he] could have come down hard." However, Sisko's leniency does not stop Odo from regularly interfering with Quark's illegal doings. A shrewd businessman, Quark often quotes the Ferengi Rules of Acquisition. In one episode, "Civil Defense", when Quark and Odo are trapped in Odo's office as Deep Space Nine is about to explode, Quark mourns the fact that despite a lifetime of plotting and faithfully following the Rules of Acquisition the only thing he owns is a bar; Odo tries to cheer Quark up by saying that although he has known of Ferengi who are richer than Quark, Quark is the most devious Ferengi Odo has ever met.

When the Bajoran wormhole is discovered, Quark helps broker deals between several Gamma Quadrant races and the Ferengi. The Alpha Quadrant's first knowledge of the Dominion comes through his business dealings in the Gamma Quadrant with the Karemma of the Dominion. Quark becomes Grand Nagus for a brief period when it appears that Zek had died; however, Zek's death turns out to be a ruse and Quark is promptly deposed. Along with Commander Sisko, Quark is also among the first to encounter the genetically engineered soldiers of the Dominion, the Jem'Hadar.

Quark repeatedly clashes with FCA (Ferengi Commerce Authority) liquidator Brunt, who believes that Quark is detrimental to Ferengi society and beliefs. The two meet initially in a scandal involving Quark's mother Ishka, who had earned profit despite this being illegal for a female. Following this, Brunt is responsible for Quark receiving a savage beating at the hands of Nausicaan thugs. The attack is meant to coerce Quark into dissolving the employee union founded by his brother, Rom. Instead, Quark secretly honors many of the union's demands. Later, when Quark is falsely diagnosed with a fatal disease, Brunt anonymously buys the Ferengi bartender's remains six days in advance. When Quark discovers he is not dying and backs out of the contract, Brunt revokes Quark's business license with glee, but Quark's friends supply him with all the equipment necessary to continue operating his bar anyway. (Body Parts) (The license is later reinstated as part of a deal between Quark and Brunt to break up Zek and Ishka, who had begun a relationship.) When Brunt almost becomes Grand Nagus, Quark temporarily becomes a female named Lumba to convince FCA commissioner Nilva that allowing Ferengi females to wear clothing is an opportunity for profit. Brunt does not believe the charade for a minute, but Nilva is deceived and chases "her" amorously. After Quark is accidentally transported 400 years into the past to Roswell, New Mexico 1947 he dreams of altering the space-time continuum by the creation of a vast Ferengi economic Empire across the universe with himself in charge of it ("Little Green Men"). In a concluding episode of the series, "The Dogs of War", Quark is horrified to learn from Brunt that the Grand Nagus has "reformed" Ferengi world with such "innovations" as prices of official bribes; taxes, social welfare and the institution of a "Congress" of 240 business partners. (In comic relief Both Quark and Brunt pray that Ferenginar turn back to unrestrained capitalism). Quark vows to return the Ferengi world back to unchecked exploitation of capitalism when he becomes Grand Nagus but is stunned when it is his brother Rom who becomes "Grand Nagus" instead. In the last episode of the series, Quark literally has the last line of the series when he remarks that the more things seem to change, the more they stay the same. ("What You Leave Behind")

Quark, Rom and Nog do not understand or speak English/Federation Standard, but rather rely on Universal Translators implanted near their ears ("Little Green Men").

=== Family, friends, and romantic interests ===
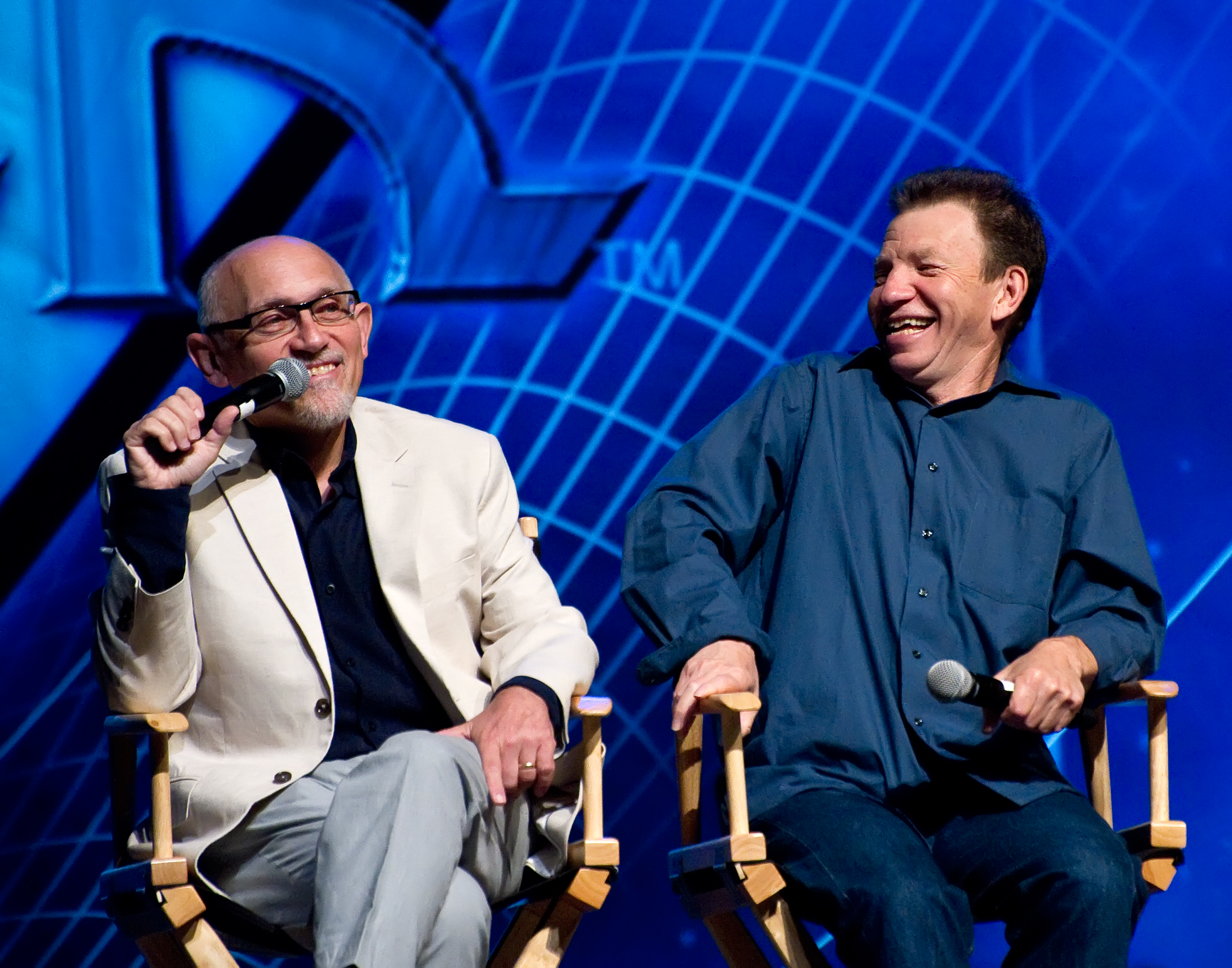
Quark was portrayed by Armin Shimerman (left); his brother Rom was portrayed by Max Grodénchik (right)

Quark loved his brother Rom, and occasionally even found him useful. Nonetheless, in true Ferengi fashion, he treated Rom with little respect and ordered him about like a servant. Quark was also fond of swindling Rom out of his share of the bar's profits. They were partners in many other business ventures, although Quark routinely made sure to keep Rom in the dark about the true nature of their dealings. Quark's nephew, Nog, also briefly worked in his uncle's bar, before departing for Starfleet Academy. Rom eventually succeeded Zek as Grand Nagus, largely through the machinations of Ishka.

Quark's relationship with his mother Ishka was tumultuous at best. She drove him to distraction with her untraditional ways. Ishka insisted upon wearing clothing and making profit. She was the financial mastermind in the family. However, Quark's father Keldar refused to listen to her advice simply because she was female. Ishka reluctantly revealed to Quark that he was a lot like her, while Rom was more like his father. She became Zek's lover and trusted advisor.

Throughout the series, Quark was often locked in a battle of wits with station security chief Odo, who regularly foiled Quark's criminal schemes. The two eventually developed a grudging respect for each other. When Odo finally left the station to rejoin the Great Link at the end of the series, Quark came to say goodbye, and made a toast to Odo. Quark also had a firm friendship with Jadzia Dax, with whom he often played tongo. Although Quark presented himself as amoral and ruthless, he deeply cared for his friends. In "Move Along Home" when he was apparently forced to sacrifice one of four crew members (Sisko, Dax, Bashir and Kira) in a strange alien game, he refused to make a choice, begging for their lives.

Quark has a cousin, Gaila, who is an arms dealer and has become successful enough to buy his own moon. Gaila appears in two episodes, "Business as Usual" and "The Magnificent Ferengi," portrayed by Josh Pais.

Quark has had his share of romances throughout the series. In the first season, he was involved with Vash, a corrupt archaeologist first introduced in Star Trek: The Next Generation. He was married to (and divorced from) a Klingon (Grilka) in an incident that also garnered him considerable respect from the Klingon community for his bravery, when he exposed how her husband's rival had tried to attack his House through business measures rather than a straightforward duel and then provoked said rival into trying to kill Quark in a duel when Quark was unarmed and had freely acknowledged that he would lose. He had a Cardassian love interest (Natima Lang), was shown on several occasions to be attracted to both Major Kira Nerys and Lieutenant Commander Jadzia Dax, and once tried to seduce a Vulcan member of the Maquis (although this may have been motivated by his own efforts to find out more about the group). He also had a platonic affair with Pel, a female Ferengi posing as a male in order to make profit.

In the non-canon novels set after the series, Quark starts a romantic relation with Ro Laren who has taken Odo's place as head of security.

The Mirror Universe version of Quark appeared only once, in the episode "Crossover". At first he appears much the same as his regular counterpart (although mirror Quark has no idea what 'gold pressed latinum', a staple of Ferengi currency, is), but it is soon revealed that mirror Quark is actively helping Terran slaves escape the cruelty of the Klingon/Cardassian Alliance. This version of Quark is eventually caught and executed when his activities are discovered.

== Guest appearances ==
Armin Shimerman appeared as Quark in the 7th-season Star Trek: The Next Generation episode "Firstborn", where in conversation it is clear Riker already knew him, and in the Star Trek: Voyager pilot episode "Caretaker". He is referenced in the Star Trek: Picard episode "Stardust City Rag" when a "Quark's Bar" is seen on the planet "Freecloud" in the Alpha Doradus system. Shimerman voiced Quark on the animated series in a guest appearance on Star Trek: Lower Decks Season 3 episode "Hear All, Trust Nothing", where it is revealed that the Freecloud establishment is one of 21 franchised locations Quark has established across the Alpha Quadrant.

== Expanded Universe media ==
Quark is featured in Star Trek novels published by Pocket Books. This includes books written by Shimerman.

== Reception ==
In 2016, Screen Rant rated Quark as the 17th best character in Star Trek overall, highlighting the character as a commentary on the human condition. In 2018, The Wrap ranked Quark as the 25th best main cast character of Star Trek overall, calling him a "valuable ally to Sisko when the chips are down".

In her 1998 book The Soul of Popular Culture, Mary Lynn Kittelson noted that Quark allowed Star Trek writers to discuss controversial topics of money, profit and capitalism. M. Keith Booker in his 2018 book Star Trek: A Cultural History described Quark as "Star Trek's most important Ferengi character", "major character of DS9" who is also "the first main Star Trek character not to be a crew member". He noted that Quark's primary purpose in the show is comedic relief.
