= Tears of the Prophets =

- Star Trek: Deep Space Nine episode
- Episode no.: Season 6 Episode 26
- Directed by: Allan Kroeker
- Written by: Ira Steven Behr; Hans Beimler
- Cinematography by: Jonathan West
- Production code: 550
- Original air date: June 15, 1998

Guest appearances
- Andrew Robinson as Elim Garak; Jeffrey Combs as Weyoun; Marc Alaimo as Gul Dukat; David Birney as Letant; J. G. Hertzler as General Martok; Aron Eisenberg as Ensign Nog; Casey Biggs as Damar; Barry Jenner as Admiral Ross; James Darren as Vic Fontaine; Michelle Horn as Saghi; Bob Kirsh as Glinn

Episode chronology
← Previous "The Sound of Her Voice"	Next → "Image in the Sand"
- Star Trek: Deep Space Nine season 6

"Tears of the Prophets" is the 26th and final episode of the sixth season of the American science fiction television series Star Trek: Deep Space Nine, the 150th episode overall. It was first broadcast in broadcast syndication in the United States the week of June 15, 1998. It was written by Ira Steven Behr and Hans Beimler, and directed by Allan Kroeker. The episode featured the death of the character Jadzia Dax and the final appearance on the series of actress Terry Farrell.

Set in the 24th century, the series follows the adventures of the crew of the Starfleet-managed Bajoran space station Deep Space Nine. The station is adjacent to a wormhole leading to the distant Gamma Quadrant; the wormhole is home to powerful alien beings worshiped by the Bajorans as the "Prophets". The later seasons of the series follow a war between the United Federation of Planets and the Dominion, an expansionist empire from the Gamma Quadrant that has already absorbed the nearby planet of Cardassia. In this episode, the Federation decides to move on the offensive against the Dominion. Captain Benjamin Sisko (Avery Brooks) is warned by the Prophets not to leave Deep Space Nine, but decides to ignore their warning. As Starfleet attacks a Cardassian star system, the former Cardassian leader Dukat (Marc Alaimo), possessed by one of the Pah-wraiths, the enemies of the Prophets, kills Jadzia (Terry Farrell) and disables the wormhole. After Jadzia's death, Sisko declares that he is leaving the station and returning to Earth.

The premise of the attack on the wormhole originated as a plan to end the seventh season of DS9, and was again suggested for the end of season six when planning began for that season. The imminent departure of Farrell caused problems for the writers as they sought to include both elements into the episode. The episode raised themes of revenge and the conflict between military service and religion. Although the critics' reviews were positive and the episode received a high level of press coverage due to the publicized death of Jadzia Dax, it was viewed by 3.9 million viewers in the first broadcast, the lowest of the season.

== Plot ==
Admiral Ross informs Captain Sisko that Starfleet intends to go on the offensive in the war against the Dominion. They decide to attack the Chin'toka star system—but must attack soon, as intelligence arrives that the Cardassians and the Dominion are about to improve Chin'toka's defenses with unmanned weapons platforms. Meanwhile, Worf and Jadzia Dax discuss their plans to have a baby.

The night before the attack, Sisko receives a vision from the Prophets, who warn him not to leave the station. Sisko tells Ross about the vision, who responds that he must decide between his duty to Starfleet and the Prophets.

Meanwhile, the Cardassian leader Damar and his Dominion handler Weyoun receive an unexpected visit from Damar's predecessor, Dukat. Dukat discloses his plan to allow one of the enemies of the Prophets, the Pah-wraiths, to possess him. He breaks a Bajoran artifact, thereby releasing a Pah-wraith in the form of a red mist that enters his body.

The attack fleet arrives at Chin'toka just as the weapons platforms are activated. As the fleet is being destroyed, on board the USS Defiant, Elim Garak, a Cardassian working with Starfleet, infers that the platforms can be taken offline if the Defiant finds and destroys their central power source.

On Deep Space Nine, Dax is visiting the Bajoran Temple when Dukat, possessed by the Pah-wraith, suddenly transports in; he hits her with bolts of energy from his hands and she collapses. He opens an Orb of the Prophets and the Pah-wraith leaves his body, entering the Orb, which turns black. Outside the station, the Bajoran wormhole implodes.

On the Defiant, Sisko is shaken, sensing the attack on the Prophets; Major Kira takes over and successfully commands the destruction of the weapons platforms. After the battle, they are summoned urgently back to the station. When they arrive, they are informed that the wormhole is gone and all the Bajoran orbs have turned dark.

Dr. Bashir is able to save the Dax symbiont that shares Jadzia's consciousness, but not Jadzia herself. She survives long enough to say goodbye to Worf. Over Jadzia's coffin, Sisko decides that he must take a leave of absence on Earth. He departs with his son, Jake, leaving Kira in charge of DS9.

== Production ==
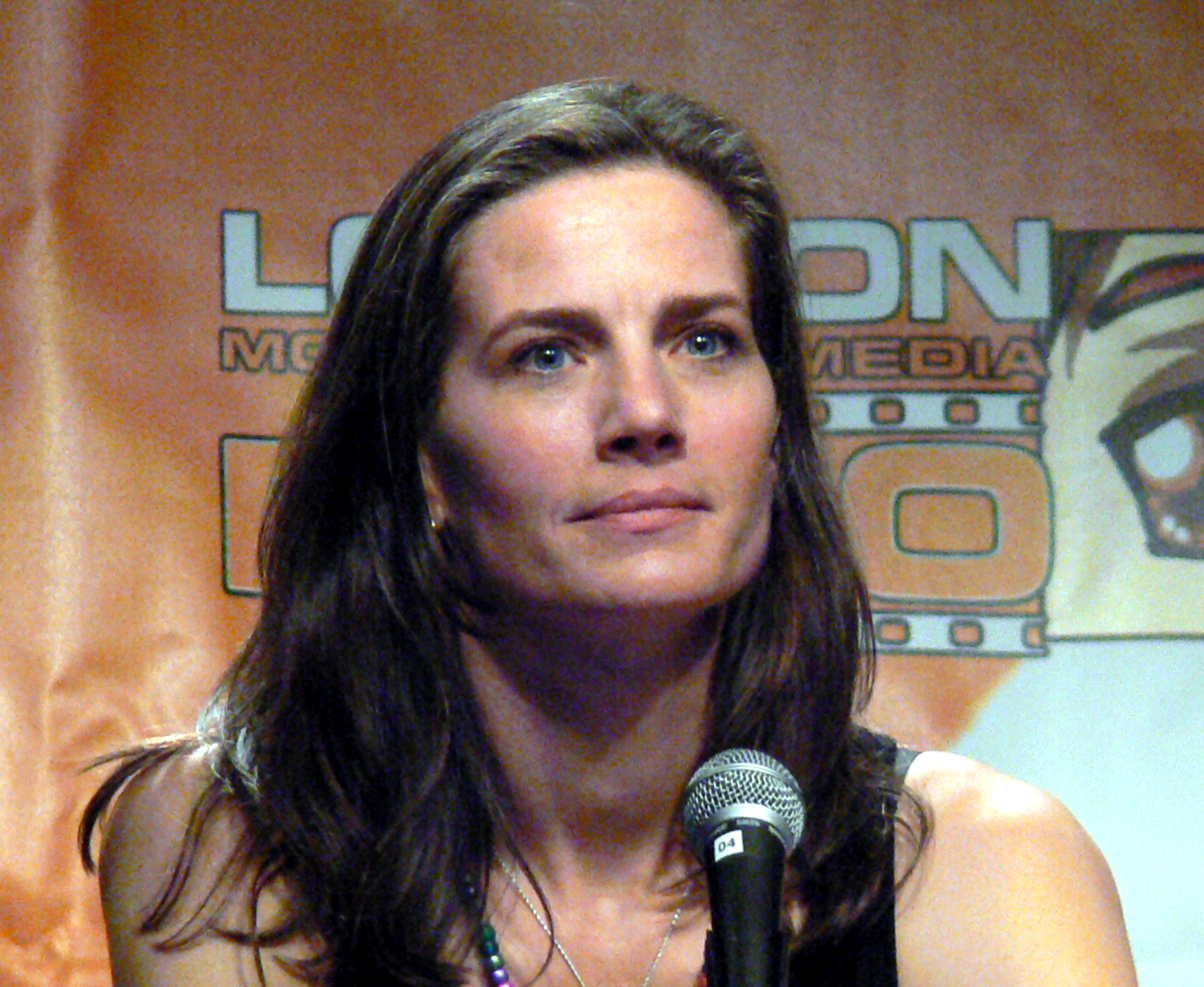
Terry Farrell at the 2009 London MCM Expo

The concept of the attack on the prophets themselves had been first raised in a discussion between Rick Berman and Ira Steven Behr, and was suggested as a potential ending to a seventh season. When plans for season six were first discussed in September 1997, it was suggested once more. Screenwriter René Echevarria said that they wanted Sisko to suffer a setback, which featured an attack by the Dominion on the prophets. The idea was raised that the plot would follow on from those in the episode "The Reckoning". In that episode, a prophet and a pah-wraith each possess a person and battle on the station before being forced out of their hosts leaving a prophecy unfulfilled. It was that prophecy which the writers intended to follow up with "Tears of the Prophets".

"Tears of the Prophets" was the final episode of Deep Space Nine to feature actress Terry Farrell, as her six-year contract came to an end. Farrell was tired of the long hours and the constantly changing schedule. Rick Berman said the only two options were to stay as main cast or be written off the show. Farrell would have preferred to be made a recurring character so that she would not be in every episode. The writers felt that due to the ongoing Dominion War in the series, that there was no alternative other than to kill off the character. On the exit of her character, Farrell said: "I don't feel cheated out of the character in the same way as I would have if the show had been cancelled, because I've gotten the opportunity to play her. And besides, it's Jadzia that's dying. Dax is living." The day after her final scene was shot, she tested for the sitcom Becker.

The departure of Farrell caused problems for the writers, as they initially were not sure how to combine their original vision for the final episode of season six, and include a suitable tribute to the character of Jadzia Dax. The initial plan had Dukat stealing an orb of the prophets, intending to destroy it inside the wormhole. As with the final episode, Sisko and the Defiant were not at the station, but Jadzia had remained behind. She would have pursued Dukat into the wormhole and somehow died in the process. It was the manner of the death which caused problems for the writers as they wanted something suitably heroic but not clichéd. In the first draft script by Hans Beimler and Behr, which was entitled "Tears of the Gods", Jadzia was killed by Dukat but managed to save the prophets in the process. Creative consultant Michael Piller felt that Jadzia's death was not a "worthy send-off" and felt rushed. The scene where Jadzia says goodbye to Worf was added, and Echevarria encouraged showing Jadzia dying on screen.

There were concerns about the number of steps required by Dukat to attack the wormhole, and it was Ron Moore who suggested the inclusion of the pah-wraiths once more. Echevarria then raised the idea of having Dukat possessed, as seen with Kira and Jake Sisko in "The Reckoning". The scene with Worf at the end of the episode was kept, and a death chant was written initially in English based upon the Native American chant Only the Earth Endures. It was subsequently translated into Klingon for the script, but Behr thought it was a shame that the audience would not be able to understand the meaning behind the words. The scene with Sisko and Jadzia's coffin was shot on a closed set, with Avery Brooks being the only actor on set in order to give a sense of intimacy to the proceedings.

They added the sense of acknowledging Sisko's failure because of the perceived reduction in the impact of the destruction of the prophets after the death of Jadzia. Brooks said of the scene: "I know about loss. It's one of the things that we experience as part of living, part of the consequences of living", but also said that the emotions were enhanced because they were going to miss Farrell. Whilst on set, there was a suggestion by set director Laura Richarz that the coffin was the same prop as used for the photon torpedo which Spock's body was loaded into in Star Trek II: The Wrath of Khan; Mike Okuda later explained that several new torpedo props were made for Star Trek VI: The Undiscovered Country, so they could not be sure if the Spock torpedo was the one used or not.

== Themes ==
The episode deals with the themes of revenge in the case of Dukat, and also the conflicting nature of religion and military duty with Sisko. Dukat had been present on the station in the episode "Sacrifice of Angels" when it was retaken by the fleet of the Federation-Klingon alliance, and suffered a nervous breakdown following the death of his daughter Tora Ziyal. In the episode "Waltz", he escapes from Federation custody whilst en route to a trial for war crimes and vows revenge against Sisko and Bajor.

== Reception ==
"Tears of the Prophets" was first broadcast on June 13, 1998 in broadcast syndication within the United States. It received Nielsen ratings of 4.1 percent, and an average of 3.9 million viewers This placed it in fifteenth place in the timeslot, and was the lowest rated episode of the sixth season during the initial broadcast. Prior to the broadcast of the episode, there had been a great deal of publicity due to the imminent death of Jadzia Dax, which had not been held back as a surprise. The advertisements placed in magazines alluded to the fact, and the story had been picked up by the national press. Farrell's subsequent casting on Becker was also covered, as was her replacement by Nicole de Boer for the seventh and final season as Ezri Dax.

Jamahl Epsicokhan of Jammer's Reviews thought that the episode took a while to get to the point, but delivered in the end, using the death of Jadzia as a way to drop Sisko "into an abyss of despair". He thought that the melodrama surrounding Jadzia's death was exaggerated, and that the manner of the death was random, but the context of the effects of Jadzia's death "really works". He gave the episode a score of three and a half out of four.

Several reviewers re-watched the episode after the end of the series. Michelle Erica Green of TrekNation called it "an episode of mythic proportion, with a tour de force performance by Avery Brooks". She praised the plot, saying that "what Sisko really did was choose tactics over intuition, or perhaps intellect over spirituality...and it was the wrong choice. This is a stunning moment for Star Trek: an acknowledgement that there are forces in the universe which cannot be coerced, manipulated, or […] talked into submission by Starfleet captains." She hoped that the repercussions from the episode would lead into the seventh series.

In 2015, Geek.com recommended this episode as "essential watching" for their abbreviated Star Trek: Deep Space Nine binge-watching guide, noting its depiction of futuristic space battles.

In 2018, SyFy included this episode on their Jadzia Dax binge-watching guide for this character. They also recommended watching it as part of a trilogy with "Image in the Sand" and "Shadows and Symbols".

In 2020, Den of Geek listed this episode as part of one of the best stories of Star Trek: Deep Space Nine.

== Home media release ==
The first home media release of "Tears of the Prophets" was as a two episode VHS cassette alongside "The Sound of Her Voice" in the United Kingdom on December 28, 1998. It was later released on DVD in the United States and Canada as part of the season six box set on November 4, 2003.
