= Ezri Dax =

Fictional character in the TV series Star Trek: Deep Space Nine

- Star Trek character
- First appearance: "Image in the Sand" (1998)
- Last appearance: "What You Leave Behind" (1999)
- Portrayed by: Nicole de Boer

In-universe information
- Species: Trill
- Affiliation: United Federation of Planets; Starfleet; House of Martok
- Posting: Deep Space Nine; USS Defiant
- Position: Counselor (Deep Space Nine); Communications Officer (USS Defiant)
- Rank: Lieutenant, Junior Grade (Season 7); Ensign (Season 7)
- Partner: Julian Bashir

Ezri Dax (/ˈɛzri ˈdæks/) is a fictional character who appears in the seventh and final season of the American science fiction TV series Star Trek: Deep Space Nine. Portrayed by Nicole de Boer, she is a counselor aboard the Bajoran space station Deep Space Nine. The character is a member of the Trill species, and is formed of both a host and a symbiont—referred to as Dax. Ezri was introduced to the series following the death of the previous Dax host, Jadzia (Terry Farrell) at the end of season six. The producers decided that the new symbiont bearer would be female in order to ensure that Nana Visitor (as Kira Nerys) was not the only female member of the main cast. There were initial difficulties in casting, and the character changed from one intended to be "spooky" to one struggling to deal with all her previous personalities, having taken on the Dax symbiont without the usual preparation. De Boer was not considered for the part until co-producer Hans Beimler suggested that she submit an audition tape, which resulted in her meeting the producers in Los Angeles and subsequently gaining the role.

The character made her appearance in the first episode of the seventh season, "Image in the Sand". The character continued to appear throughout the final season of the series, with her final appearance in the series finale, "What You Leave Behind". Her character stepped into the void left by Jadzia amongst the crew, but found that she had to redevelop those previous relationships and learn to get along with Jadzia's widower, Worf (Michael Dorn). During the course of the season, Ezri becomes less nervous about her role with the crew. She learns from the Dax symbiont and becomes involved romantically with Dr. Julian Bashir (Alexander Siddig).

The fan reaction to the character was reported as positive, but several of the Ezri-centric episodes came in for criticism, with producer Ira Steven Behr apologising to de Boer for "Prodigal Daughter" – an episode described as "just a mess" by writer Ronald D. Moore. The relationship between Ezri and both Worf and Bashir was described as one of five "great geek TV love triangles". The inclusion of the character was criticised on the internet, with Ezri being referred to as both an "ill-conceived idea" and a "replacement Dax".

== Concept and development ==
Terry Farrell had portrayed the character of Jadzia Dax from the pilot episode "Emissary" through to "Tears of the Prophets", the final episode of season six. The actress had decided not to renew her contract for the seventh season, and so the character was killed off in her final appearance. Due to the character's symbiotic nature, only the host died; the symbiont known as Dax survived – which allowed the producers to reintroduce it in a new host later.

Prior to the start of the seventh season, the producers sought to re-introduce Dax with a new host. They decided immediately that it had to be a female character, as otherwise Kira Nerys, played by Nana Visitor, would be the only female main character. There were some difficulties in finding an actress who met the requirements of the part; Ira Steven Behr said "So we started the casting process, and all I saw was a lot of people who couldn't play the part. There was absolutely no one in the running." The initial casting call required an actress with a "spooky" quality, but following the failure to find someone adequate, co-supervising producer René Echevarria suggested that the character instead should be someone who was unprepared to be joined with Dax and only did so because of an unexpected occurrence.

Echevarria suggested this to Behr over lunch, but he initially was not sure. By the time they had returned separately to the studio, Behr had an entire plan worked out based on the new premise for the character. Behr suggested that the character should be basically acting as if she has schizophrenia, saying "We'd never played up the idea in the past, but it made sense. What must it be like to hear all those voices and opinions?" The producers also decided that they wanted a younger actress who felt vulnerable in order to offset the strength that Jadzia had grown into over the years. Casting remained difficult, until Hans Beimler suggested an actress from Canada whom he had once worked with – Nicole de Boer. She had worked with Beimler on the television series Beyond Reality and TekWar. She was asked to submit an audition tape in which she played out a scene between Ezri and Quark, which she recorded, herself, in her hotel room, and later admitted that she did not know what a Trill was at the time.

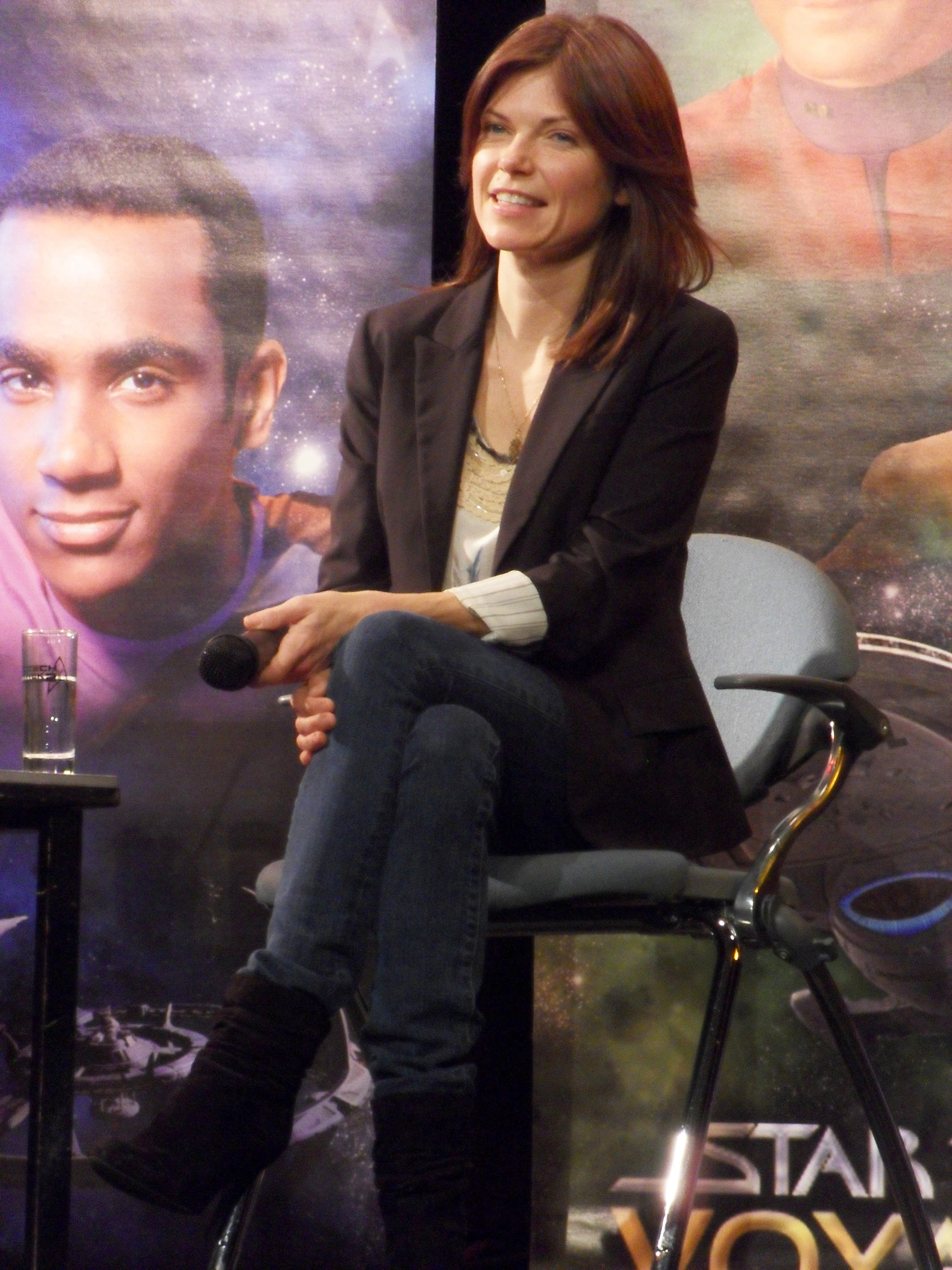
Nicole de Boer in 2013

At the time, de Boer was busy working in Canada but was unknown as an actress in the United States. She was called to Los Angeles to audition in person based on the strength of the tape, in which she performed a four and a half minute scene written specifically for the audition. It was later converted into a scene used in the episode "Afterimage". She thought she had ruined her audition when she nearly choked on a glass of water as executive producer Rick Berman entered the room and had to run to the bathroom, by which time she had already soaked her clothes and caused her mascara to run. But Behr praised her, saying "We got a good vibe off her, she knew her part. She got it. And that was it."

As part of her preparation for each day's filming, she had the Trill spots applied by makeup artist Mary Kay Morse, with Michael Westmore working on her detailing instead. This was a change from when Farrell had portrayed Jadzia, as in that case, Westmore had applied the spots himself each day. She made her first appearance in the season seven opener, "Image in the Sand", for which she was required for only half a day, as she was in only one scene. "I came in and I had one line — that's it, I hadn't even moved to L.A. yet and I hadn't found a place to live." She began to understand what was required of her from her second episode onwards. She later explained that "I never really got too freaked in the beginning. I thought more of this as the biggest job I've ever had, than going into the whole Star Trek phenomenon. I just wanted to do a good job."

De Boer felt that the producers did a good job with involving Ezri over the course of the seventh season, but not to the extent that it detracted from the more established members of the main cast. However, there was one part of the season when she was concerned that the fans would suffer from "Ezri overload". But she felt that the character had a real story arc and character evolution as the season went by. She said that she did not want Ezri to remain the same "young and confused" person that she was in her first appearances, which was something that the writers and producers agreed with. She said, "As time went on, you saw that Ezri was intelligent, that she was endearing and a good person. She became a more complicated character than you might have thought in her first few episodes." She praised specific episodes that evolved the character, such as "The Siege of AR-558" which required Ezri to draw upon Dax's past experiences, as otherwise she would have been completely out of her element. De Boer also enjoyed "Prodigal Daughter" as the episode showed the change in Ezri from before she was joined with the Dax symbiont, and she thought that the events portrayed in "Field of Fire" were "fascinating". As she approached the end of Deep Space Nine, de Boer addressed the rumors of her joining Star Trek: Voyager, saying that "My first instinct would be to say no. I would need to feel there was a reason for Ezri to be on Voyager". She was interviewed at the series wrap party after completing filming on the final episode, "What You Leave Behind", and said, "The last episode was very emotional, especially on the last day... I couldn't believe that a season had gone by already. I realized all the people I'd grown close to must be feeling it much more because they'd been doing it 7 years. I cried."

== Appearances ==
=== Background ===
Ezri Tigan was born in 2354; she is a member of the indigenous species of the planet Trill. She grew up in the Sappora system with her family, who were shown on the series in the episode "Prodigal Daughter". She enrolled in Starfleet Academy in 2372 in the medical program, with a specialization in psychology. Two years later, she was assigned as assistant ship's counsellor to the USS Destiny for field training. During this journey, the ship was assigned to transport the Dax symbiont from Deep Space Nine to Trill, after its host Jadzia (Terry Farrell) was killed by Dukat (Marc Alaimo), but it became necessary for the Dax symbiont to be joined to a new host en route.

As Ezri Tigan was the only unjoined Trill on board, she agreed to be joined to the symbiont even though she was unprepared and had not previously sought to be joined. Following the procedure, Ezri—now known as Ezri Dax—spent time at the Symbiosis Institute on Trill to learn to adapt to her new state. Because of her new state, Ezri's romantic relationship with her former boyfriend ended; she later explained to her family that he reminded her of a past host's son.

=== Star Trek: Deep Space Nine ===
Ezri Dax made her first appearance on the Star Trek: Deep Space Nine series in the premiere episode of season seven, "Image in the Sand". She had travelled to Earth to find Captain Benjamin Sisko (Avery Brooks), an old friend of both Jadzia and Curzon Dax—two former hosts of the symbiont. She leaves with him, Jake Sisko (Cirroc Lofton) and Joseph Sisko (Brock Peters), to travel to the planet Tyree to search for the Orb of the Emissary. They find the device; the Captain is hesitant to open it but does, with Ezri's encouragement—resulting in the restoration of the Bajoran wormhole. Together they return to Deep Space Nine, where Ezri meets the rest of the station's crew for the first time.

In the following episode "Afterimage", Ezri must cope with the reactions of Jadzia's former friends to the return of Dax. Worf (Michael Dorn), Jadzia's widower, reacts poorly, and Garak (Andrew Robinson) begins to develop the symptoms of acute claustrophobia. Together, Ezri and Garak work through his issues, resulting in her realising that she can remain on the station and Starfleet agreeing to her skipping her final periods of training and receiving a promotion from ensign to lieutenant (junior grade) based on the past experiences of the Dax symbiont. In "The Siege of AR-558", Ezri is forced to rely on her symbiont's past experiences after she and the other members of the Defiant crew end up fighting against the Jem'Hadar on the front lines.

In "Prodigal Daughter", Ezri returns to her family home on the planet New Sydney, in the Sappora system, after Sisko asks her to investigate the disappearance of Chief Miles O'Brien (Colm Meaney). There she finds that her family and their pergium mining business are involved with the Orion Syndicate, and discovers that her brother Norvo (Kevin Rahm) murdered the person that O'Brien was searching for. The Mirror Universe episode "The Emperor's New Cloak" showed an unjoined Ezri Tigan, who is in a relationship with both the alternative Kira Nerys (Nana Visitor) and Leeta (Chase Masterson). During the course of the episode, Tigan kills the mirror-Garak, in revenge for the death of Brunt (Jeffrey Combs). The remaining episodes of the season are set in the main universe, with the following episode "Field of Fire" exploring Ezri's use of the memories of Joran Dax (Leigh McCloskey)—who had previously been revealed as a murderer in the third season episode "Equilibrium". She uses those memories to track down a Vulcan serial killer on the station.

Ezri takes a Runabout to the Badlands against Sisko's orders in the episode "Penumbra" in order to search for Worf, who has been lost on board a Klingon vessel. She manages to find his escape pod and brings him on board, but the two argue as he resents her presenting herself with the same opinions as Jadzia Dax. However, the two are soon attacked by the Jem'Hadar and are forced to transport themselves to a nearby planet. The two continue to argue, which results in them having sex. They are captured by the Breen shortly afterwards. The two are subsequently interrogated in "'Til Death Do Us Part", and she reveals to Worf that she is actually in love with Julian Bashir (Alexander Siddig). They are subsequently handed over to the Dominion as the Breen/Dominion alliance is announced.

After Worf kills Weyoun (Jeffrey Combs), the pair are scheduled for execution, during which Ezri helps Worf acknowledge that he can't idealise Jadzia's memory, accepting that he and his wife had different views on intimacy. However, Damar (Casey Biggs), the leader of the Cardassian Union is concerned at what the new alliance might bring and wants to side with the Federation; he releases Ezri and Worf and sets them free to take a message back to Deep Space Nine to seek aid. Worf discusses the actions of the Klingon Chancellor, Gowron (Robert O'Reilly), with Ezri in "Tacking into the Wind". Hearing Ezri's more pragmatic view on the recent decline of Klingon culture results in Worf confronting the Chancellor and slaying him, ushering in General Martok (J. G. Hertzler) as the new leader of the Klingons as the only man Worf trusts to lead his people honorably. In the series finale, "What You Leave Behind", Ezri and Bashir reveal their feelings for one another, and later after the fall of Cardassia Prime and the surrender of the Dominion, they discuss their future together.

=== Depiction after the series ===
In Pocket Books' non-canon DS9 Relaunch novels, Ezri remains on Deep Space Nine but moves from counseling to command, and received a promotion to Lieutenant to become executive officer of the USS Defiant. Following a mission on the Trill homeworld, she and Bashir end their romance but decide to remain close friends. In the Star Trek: Destiny trilogy, Dax, who had transferred to second officer of the new Vesta-class multimission explorer starship USS Aventine, received a battlefield promotion to captain and commanding officer. She played a critical role in bringing about the final defeat of the Borg. During the Star Trek: Typhon Pact and Star Trek: The Fall series, Dax continues to serve as Captain of the Aventine. In the Star Trek: The Next Generation novel Takedown, the newly promoted Admiral William Riker is stationed aboard the Aventine alongside Captain Dax, and the ship is pursued by the Enterprise as he is leading a number of renegade starships in attacking Federation targets, later revealed to be the result of Riker being brainwashed by an alien race and choosing the Aventine as a subtle means of disrupting their plans by performing his assigned tasks faster than anticipated to give his old shipmates time to deduce his plans and stop them. Ezri is killed in the first part of the Star Trek: Coda trilogy, when a temporal disruption leads to the entire multiverse being destabilised, culminating in the Enterprise being forced to erase the events of the Novel Verse from existence to preserve the prime reality (as depicted in Star Trek: Picard and related shows).

== Reception and commentary ==
The general fan reaction to the character was positive, and the fans appreciated de Boer's performances. One negative issue that was raised was that the number of Ezri-centric episodes reduced the number of those available to close up the story arcs involving other characters. The actress had been concerned that the fans did not like her while the production was underway as she was not receiving any fan mail, except for that which she received on her first day of filming. De Boer was not aware that the production team had been holding sacks of mail from the public for her, and she was only able to access it about three quarters of the way through the season. Ezri was referred to as "Ally McTrill" by TV Guide magazine — a reference to the title character on the television series Ally McBeal — which de Boer took as a compliment.

The differences between Ezri and Jadzia were often considered by viewers and critics. In Where No Woman Has Gone Before: Feminist Perspectives On Star Trek, an essay by Susan A. Lentz within the book Star Trek Visions of Law and Justice, Ezri was described as "less assured, insecure, and uncertain who she is. Of course, Jadzia may have herself once been such a host. The growth and evolution of Ezri unfold as she acknowledges her 'past lives'." Ezri's relationships with Bashir and Worf were also regarded as an extension of Jadzia's previous relationships, leading to it being listed as one of the 5 "great geek TV love triangles" by the website Den of Geek. However, this romantic plot featuring Ezri and Worf/Bashir was criticised by website DVD Talk in their review of the season seven DVD release saying that it was similar to a "soap opera".

Criticism was directed at some of the character's aspects, and toward the introduction of the character. Jim Johnson-Smith, in American Science Fiction TV, uses an example of Ezri and Worf's concentration on their romantic relationship in the episode "'Til Death Do Us Part" instead of being more concerned with their capture by the Breen. Ezri was described as "an ill-conceived idea that never really took off and has left many DS9 fans angry that a show favourite (Jadzia Dax) isn't around any more" by the website Flickering Myth. The review on DVD Talk also stated "With its large ensemble cast, DS9 could have gone on perfectly well without a replacement for Jadzia. Instead, we get a "replacement Dax" who turns out to be, hands down, the least interesting and most annoying character DS9 has been stuck with."

In addition, as de Boer feared, the Ezri-centric episodes came in for criticism. DVD Talk described "Prodigal Daughter" as "clearly an attempt to cram some back-story into Ezri to make up for the fact that she's a new character", and "Field of Fire" as "utterly generic". The former was also considered to be the weakest of the season by the crew on the series, with Behr apologising to de Boer for it afterwards. Writer Ronald D. Moore simply stated, "It was just a mess." The crew nicknamed it "Audra Goes Home", a reference to the 1960s western television show The Big Valley. In 2016, Ezri was ranked as the 32nd most important character of Starfleet within the Star Trek science fiction universe by Wired magazine, out of 100 characters.

=== Mirror version ===
The mirror version of Ezri, as seen in the episode "The Emperor's New Cloak", was not joined to the Dax symbiont, and was both a mercenary and a lesbian. Previously when Star Trek had dealt with issues relating to homosexuality, it had received complaints from the fanbase. This had occurred during the fifth season of Star Trek: The Next Generation in the episode "The Outcast" where Commander William Riker (Jonathan Frakes) has a romantic liaison with a female member of an alien race that is typically non-gendered and whose society views identifying with a gender as deviant behavior.

Criticism was received once again when Jadzia Dax had a same-sex kiss in the episode "Rejoined". Because of real world changes, such as further acceptance of same-sex couples and an increased number of homosexual characters on television, the negative response to the lesbian version of Ezri was not as heavy as those earlier story-lines.
