= Image in the Sand =

- Star Trek: Deep Space Nine episode
- Episode no.: Season 7 Episode 1
- Directed by: Les Landau
- Written by: Ira Steven Behr; Hans Beimler
- Production code: 551
- Original air date: September 28, 1998

Guest appearances
- Brock Peters as Joseph Sisko; Aron Eisenberg as Nog; Jeffrey Combs as Weyoun; Casey Biggs as Damar; Megan Cole as Cretak; J. G. Hertzler as General Martok; Barry Jenner as Admiral Ross; Deborah Lacey as The Face; James Darren as Vic Fontaine; Nicole de Boer as Ezri Dax

Episode chronology
← Previous "Tears of the Prophets"	Next → "Shadows and Symbols"
- Star Trek: Deep Space Nine season 7

"Image in the Sand" is the 151st episode of the American television series Star Trek: Deep Space Nine, the opening episode for the series' seventh and final season. It was first aired the week of September 28, 1998.

Set in the 24th century, the series follows the adventures of the crew of Deep Space Nine a Starfleet-run space station near the planet Bajor, guarding a wormhole that leads to Gamma Quadrant on the other side of the galaxy. The wormhole is home to the Prophets, powerful alien beings who are worshiped by the Bajorans and have made Benjamin Sisko, the human commander of Deep Space Nine, their "Emissary". The later seasons of the series follow a war between the United Federation of Planets and the Dominion, an expansionist empire from the Gamma Quadrant.

This episode continues the story that began in the finale of the sixth season, "Tears of the Prophets", in which Sisko's close friend Jadzia Dax was killed by the Pah-wraiths, the Prophets' evil counterparts, and the wormhole was sealed shut. In this episode, Sisko receives a vision from the Prophets, sending him on a new quest; Jadzia's husband Worf, along with her friends, try to cope with her death; and Kira Nerys, in charge of Deep Space Nine in Sisko's absence, negotiates the rocky relationship between Bajor, the Federation and their allies the Romulans.

Guest stars include James Darren who returns as Vic Fontaine, Barry Jenner as Starfleet Admiral Ross, J. G. Hertzler as Klingon General Martok and Megan Cole as the Romulan senator Cretak.

== Plot ==
On Deep Space Nine, Kira has recently been promoted to the rank of Colonel. A cult worshipping the Pah-wraiths is gaining strength in reaction to the closing of the wormhole. Meanwhile, the Romulan Empire establishes a delegation on the station, led by one Senator Cretak. Cretak asks Kira to petition the Bajoran government to allow the Romulans to set up a hospital on the uninhabited moon of Derna. Later, security chief Odo reports the Romulan hospital is turning away wounded Starfleet personnel, and appears to be heavily armed. Kira demands that the weapons be removed immediately, but Cretak refuses.

Worf is frustrated that the USS Defiant is assigned to nothing more dangerous than escorting cargo runs. He confides in Chief O'Brien that he is worried that Jadzia won't enter Klingon heaven, Sto'Vo'Kor, because she didn't die in battle; the only way to ensure her place in Sto'Vo'Kor is by winning a glorious battle in her name. General Martok recruits Worf to join a dangerous mission that will ensure Jadzia's place in Sto'Vo'Kor; O'Brien and Dr. Bashir decide to accompany him.

Meanwhile, Benjamin Sisko is taking extended leave on Earth. He separates himself from his family, doing nothing but playing the piano in his father Joseph's restaurant; his son Jake is worried about his father's attitude. Benjamin experiences a vision from the Prophets: he sees himself digging frantically in the sand on the planet Tyree, and uncovers the face of a woman whom he does not recognize. Joseph eventually reveals that the face belongs to Benjamin's biological mother Sarah, who abandoned the family when Benjamin was a year old and later died. Joseph also gives Benjamin a necklace of Sarah's, which has ancient Bajoran writing on it reading "Orb of the Emissary"; Benjamin decides to travel to Tyree to search for this Orb. The next night, he is attacked by a member of the Pah-wraith cult, attempting to prevent him from finding the Orb; after he heals, Joseph and Jake decide to go to Tyree with him. As they are about to leave, a young Starfleet ensign, a Trill whom Benjamin does not recognize, arrives and introduces herself as "Dax".

== Reception ==
It received Nielsen ratings of 4.4 points, equating to 4.4 million viewers when it was first broadcast on syndicated television in September 1998.

Author Allan W. Austin said the episode has a theme of destiny, especially for Sisko.

In 2015, Geek.com recommended this episode as "essential watching" for their abbreviated Star Trek: Deep Space Nine binge-watching guide.

In 2018, SyFy recommend this episode for its abbreviated watch guide for the Bajoran character Kira Nerys.

In 2019, Screen Rant ranked a character introduced in this episode, Kimara Cretak, as the 4th most important Romulan of the Star Trek franchise.

In 2020, Den of Geek listed this as one of the best stories of Star Trek: Deep Space Nine.

== Cast ==
This episode briefly introduces Ensign Ezri Dax (portrayed by Nicole de Boer) as the new host for the Dax symbiont. Also, Deborah Lacey is introduced as a mysterious face in the sand, which becomes a plot element in the show and part of the overall story.
