= Prodigal Daughter (Star Trek: Deep Space Nine) =

- Star Trek: Deep Space Nine episode
- Episode no.: Season 7 Episode 11
- Directed by: Victor Lobl
- Written by: Bradley Thompson, David Weddle
- Production code: 561
- Original air date: January 4, 1999

Guest appearances
- Clayton Landey as Fuchida; John Paragon as Bokar; Kevin Rahm as Norvo; Mikael Salazar as Janel; Leigh Taylor-Young as Yanas

Episode chronology
← Previous "It's Only a Paper Moon"	Next → "The Emperor's New Cloak"
- Star Trek: Deep Space Nine season 7

"Prodigal Daughter" is the 161st episode of the television series Star Trek: Deep Space Nine, the 11th episode of the seventh season.

Set in the 24th century, the series follows the adventures of the crew of the space station Deep Space Nine. In this episode, station counselor Ezri Dax visits her family and uncovers their connection with the organized crime ring known as the Orion Syndicate. Ezri's mother Yanas is played by guest star Leigh Taylor Young.

"Prodigal Daughter" was written by Bradley Thompson and David Weddle and directed by Victor Lobl. The episode was nominated for an Emmy for outstanding art direction.

== Plot ==
Chief Miles O'Brien has gone missing on the planet New Sydney searching for Morica Bilby, the widow of a member of the Orion Syndicate whom he befriended while undercover. Because Ezri Dax's family, the Tigans, own a mining operation on a nearby planet, she is sent to find O'Brien.

Returning home for the first time in several years, Ezri is reunited with her domineering mother, Yanas Tigan—a shrewd businesswoman—and her brothers Norvo and Janel, who work for the business. Yanas promises to look into O'Brien's disappearance, while criticizing Ezri's life choices. Norvo is happy to see Ezri, while Janel is bitter about how infrequently she visits. Catching up with Norvo, Ezri urges him to move away from home, escape their mother's constant criticism, and pursue his interest in art, about which he is intensely self-critical.

The local police deliver O'Brien to the Tigan home, having rescued him from a run-in with the Orion Syndicate. O'Brien has found Morica Bilby dead, and suspects she was killed by the Syndicate; the police reject this theory on the grounds that the Syndicate would never murder the widow of one of their own.

O'Brien helps Janel repair some mining equipment, which has had inexplicable malfunctions lately. Bokar, an agent of the Orion Syndicate, warns Janel that O'Brien's life will be in danger if he doesn't leave immediately. O'Brien guesses that the Orion Syndicate is intimidating the Tigans and gets Ezri's permission to check the mining company's financial records. He is stunned to learn that Morica Bilby was on the Tigan payroll at the time of her death, implying that someone close to Ezri may be involved in Morica's murder.

Ezri confronts her family with O'Brien's findings. Janel admits that Morica was on the payroll to repay a debt to the Syndicate, which bailed the mining company out of a financial crisis, but he denies killing Morica. Angered that her son struck such a corrupt deal behind her back, Yanas doubts his innocence. To everyone's surprise, Norvo admits that he killed Morica after she tried to extort more money from the family. He tries to justify his action by saying that he was never trusted to make big decisions. As a result, Norvo is sentenced to 30 years in prison. When Yanas asks Ezri to reassure her that she isn't responsible for her son's downfall, Ezri does not answer.

== Reception ==
Michelle Erica Green of TrekNation gave the episode a negative review. Green appreciated that it gave Ezri Dax some backstory but was disappointed "did it have to be this trite and chauvinistic?" Jamahl Epsicokhan of Jammer's Reviews rated this episode as 2.5 out of 4. Darren of the m0vie blog said "It is not so much bad as it is boring". He saw it as an example of the pressure of television production where the writers did not have time to assemble the story in a way that made sense, and criticized the result as "an episode overburdened with exposition, populated by characters who spend more time recounting the plot to one another than forwarding the narrative."

This episode was nominated for an Emmy Award for Outstanding Art Direction for a Series.

== See also ==
- "Honor Among Thieves", the episode about O'Brien's friendship with Morica Bilby's husband
