= The Emperor's New Cloak =

- Star Trek: Deep Space Nine episode
- Episode no.: Season 7 Episode 12
- Directed by: LeVar Burton
- Written by: Ira Steven Behr; Hans Beimler
- Production code: 562
- Original air date: February 1, 1999

Guest appearances
- Wallace Shawn as Grand Nagus Zek; Andrew Robinson as Elim Garak; Jeffrey Combs as Brunt; Max Grodénchik as Rom; J. G. Hertzler as General Martok; Tiny Ron as Maihar'du; Chase Masterson as Leeta

Episode chronology
← Previous "Prodigal Daughter"	Next → "Field of Fire"
- Star Trek: Deep Space Nine season 7

"The Emperor's New Cloak" is the 162nd episode of the television series Star Trek: Deep Space Nine. The 12th episode of the seventh season. It premiered the week of February 1, 1999 to Nielsen ratings of 4.6.

Set in the 24th century, the series follows the adventures of the crew of the space station Deep Space Nine. This episode takes place mostly in the Mirror Universe, a parallel universe that is home to more aggressive, mistrustful, and opportunistic doppelgangers of the regular characters of the Star Trek universe, governed by a brutal alliance of the Cardassian and Klingon races. In this episode, the Ferengi characters Quark and Rom travel to the Mirror Universe to rescue the kidnapped Grand Nagus Zek, leader of the Ferengi Alliance.

The episode was directed by LeVar Burton and written by Ira Steven Behr and Hans Beimler.

The episode includes one of the first homosexual relationships depicted in the series, between the alternate universe equivalents of Kira Nerys and Ezri Dax. The episode was the second in the franchise to feature a lesbian kiss, with the first being Rejoined.

== Plot ==
The Mirror Universe counterpart of Ezri Dax shows up at Quark's quarters on Deep Space Nine with a message: Zek went to the Mirror Universe in search of business opportunities and was kidnapped by the Alliance, who demand that Quark exchange a cloaking device—a device that can render a starship invisible—for Zek's freedom. Quark and Rom steal a cloaking device from the Klingon General Martok's ship, which they hide by cloaking the device. They get the device to Ezri, and are forced to transport to the Mirror Universe with her when Martok discovers the theft.

Upon arriving at Terok Nor (the Mirror counterpart of Deep Space Nine), now under the control of the human rebellion against the Alliance, the three are arrested, since the Rebellion cannot allow the Alliance to gain such cloaking technology. They are rescued by Ezri's friend, the Mirror counterpart of Quark's rival Brunt. Brunt brings them to the Regent of the Alliance, the Mirror counterpart of Worf.

They learn that the mirror Kira Nerys—formerly the Alliance's brutal overseer of Terok Nor, now out of favor with the Alliance, and Ezri's lover—planned the entire affair; the Alliance never intended to release Zek. Brunt persuades Worf not to execute the Ferengi immediately, and Rom and Quark are imprisoned with Zek. Kira kills Brunt when he tries to convince her to release them. Ezri, disgusted by Kira's callous murder of her friend, turns against her.

Rom is forced to install the cloaking device on the Regent's ship, but despite his cooperation, he and Quark are still sentenced to die at the hands of Mirror Elim Garak. They distract Garak by comparing him to the Garak of their own universe, which delays him long enough for Ezri to arrive and inject him with the poison meant for the Ferengi.

Worf has the cloaking device activated, only to find that Rom has sabotaged the device to drain the ship's power. The powerless Alliance ship is easily overpowered by the Rebels' Defiant, forcing Worf to surrender to the Rebels. The Rebels bring the Ferengi back to Terok Nor, from which they can return to their own universe.

== Reception ==
Keith DeCandido, reviewing the episode for Tor.com in 2015, gave the episode a rating of 1 out of 10, describing the plot as predictable and the Mirror Universe concept as having worn out its welcome and become impossible to take seriously. Zack Handlen, reviewing the episode in 2014 for The A.V. Club, also gave it a negative review, calling the Mirror characters poorly developed and the writing "jokey and disengaged". In 2017, SyFy ranked this the second-worst of the seven Mirror Universe episodes of the Star Trek franchise that had aired up to that date.
