= The Wire (Star Trek: Deep Space Nine) =

- Star Trek: Deep Space Nine episode
- Episode no.: Season 2 Episode 22
- Directed by: Kim Friedman
- Written by: Robert Hewitt Wolfe
- Production code: 442
- Original air date: May 9, 1994

Guest appearances
- Andrew J. Robinson as Garak; Paul Dooley as Enabran Tain; Jimmie F. Skaggs as Glinn Boheeka; Ann Gillespie as Jabara

Episode chronology
← Previous "The Maquis, Part II"	Next → "Crossover"
- Star Trek: Deep Space Nine season 2

"The Wire" is the 42nd episode of the television series Star Trek: Deep Space Nine, the 22nd episode of the second season.

Set in the 24th century, the series follows the adventures on Deep Space Nine, a space station near the planet Bajor, as Bajor recovers from a recently ended 50-year occupation by the hostile Cardassians. This episode is the first to explore the backstory of recurring character Garak, a disgraced Cardassian former spy living in exile as a tailor on Deep Space Nine.

"The Wire" was written by Robert Hewitt Wolfe and directed by Kim Friedman, and it aired May 8, 1994 in syndication. Guest stars include Andrew J. Robinson as Garak, Ann Gillespie as Nurse Jabara, Jimmie F. Skaggs as Boheeka and Paul Dooley as Tain.

== Plot ==
At his weekly lunch date with Dr. Julian Bashir, Garak appears to be having severe headaches, but refuses to allow Bashir to help. Bashir later hears Garak discussing a deal with the bartender and small-time criminal Quark. The next day, Garak collapses in pain after drinking heavily, and Bashir takes him to the infirmary.

Bashir finds that Garak has an implant of some sort in his brain. He and Constable Odo observe Quark trying to order a piece of Cardassian biotechnology, which turns out to be classified by the Obsidian Order, the feared Cardassian intelligence agency.

Garak eventually reveals to Bashir that the implant was installed by the former head of the Obsidian Order, Enabran Tain. It was designed to make Garak resistant to torture, but he has been using it to cope with the pain of living in exile, becoming addicted to it; and it is now breaking down from overuse. Garak claims he deserves his punishment and tells how he once destroyed a ship containing 98 Cardassians, including his aide, Elim.

Bashir turns the implant off, and Garak becomes extremely agitated. He explains that rather than killing Elim, he was exiled for releasing a group of Bajoran children he was supposed to interrogate. After expressing disdain for his friendship with Bashir, Garak again loses consciousness.

Even with the implant off, Garak is still dying. Bashir considers turning the implant back on to save him. Garak refuses, and decides to tell Bashir the "truth": Elim was not Garak's aide but his childhood friend. The two were both powerful men in the Obsidian Order until Garak tried to frame Elim for releasing Bajoran prisoners, but Elim beat Garak to the punch and Garak was exiled.

Bashir seeks out Enabran Tain to ask for his help. Tain tells Bashir that if he were truly Garak's friend he would allow Garak to die; however, he agrees to give Bashir the information needed to counteract the effects of the implant. Before departing, Bashir asks Tain what truly became of Elim. Tain laughs and explains that Elim is Garak's first name.

After recovering, Garak resumes his weekly lunches with Bashir. He says he has heard a strange rumor: Odo thinks Garak was once a member of the Obsidian Order. Pressed for "real answers", Garak tells the doctor that all his stories have been true - especially the lies.

== Reception ==
Michelle Erica Green, reviewing the episode for TrekNation, felt the episode "worked" thanks to the actors, despite some misgivings about the pace and story, and described the relationship between Bashir and Garak as "flirting". Zack Handlen of The A.V. Club praised the episode for its complexity, and how it manages to change perspective on Garak without it seeming like the character's motives shifted merely because of the whims of the writers. He was also pleased that the episode gave Bashir a challenge worthy of his talents. Keith R.A. DeCandido, reviewing the episode for Tor.com in 2013, gave it a rating of eight out ten, noting it as a showcase for Garak and Bashir.

In 2014, Gizmodo ranked "The Wire" as the 49th best episode of the Star Trek franchise, out of over 700 episodes made by that time.

== Releases ==
On April 1, 2003 Season 2 of Star Trek: Deep Space Nine was released on DVD video discs, with 26 episodes on seven discs.

This episode was released in 2017 on DVD with the complete series box set, which had 176 episodes on 48 discs.
