= Star Trek: Deep Space Nine =

American science fiction television series

- Genre: Science fiction; Action adventure
- Created by: Rick Berman; Michael Piller
- Based on: Star Trek by Gene Roddenberry
- Showrunners: Michael Piller; Ira Steven Behr
- Starring: Avery Brooks; René Auberjonois; Terry Farrell; Cirroc Lofton; Colm Meaney; Armin Shimerman; Alexander Siddig; Nana Visitor; Michael Dorn; Nicole de Boer
- Theme music composer: Dennis McCarthy
- Country of origin: United States
- Original language: English
- No. of seasons: 7
- No. of episodes: 176 (list of episodes)

Production
- Executive producers: Rick Berman; Michael Piller; Ira Steven Behr
- Running time: 45 minutes
- Production company: Paramount Domestic Television

Original release
- Network: First-run syndication
- Release: January 3, 1993 – June 2, 1999

Related
- Star Trek TV series

Star Trek: Deep Space Nine (DS9) is an American science-fiction television series created by Rick Berman and Michael Piller. The fourth series in the Star Trek media franchise, it was a production of Paramount Domestic Television, a Paramount Communications Company and a Viacom Company, and originally aired in syndication from January 3, 1993, to June 2, 1999, spanning 176 episodes over seven seasons. Set in the 24th century, when Earth is part of a United Federation of Planets, its narrative is centered on the eponymous space station Deep Space Nine, located adjacent to a wormhole leading to the Gamma Quadrant on the far side of the Milky Way galaxy.

Following the success of Star Trek: The Next Generation, Paramount Pictures commissioned a new series set in the Star Trek fictional universe. In creating Deep Space Nine, Berman and Piller drew upon plot elements introduced in The Next Generation, namely the conflict between two species, the Cardassians and the Bajorans. Deep Space Nine was the first Star Trek series to be created without the direct involvement of franchise creator Gene Roddenberry, the first set on a space station rather than a traveling starship, and the first to have an African American as its central character: Starfleet Commander, later Captain, Benjamin Sisko (played by Avery Brooks).

Changes were made to the series throughout its seven-year run. In the third season, the starship USS Defiant was introduced to enable more stories away from the space station. The fourth added Worf (Michael Dorn), a character who originated on The Next Generation, to the main cast. The final three seasons deal with a story arc, that of the war between the Federation and an invading Gamma Quadrant power, the Dominion. Although not as popular as The Next Generation, Deep Space Nine was critically well received. Following the success of Deep Space Nine, Paramount commissioned Berman, Piller, and Jeri Taylor to produce Star Trek: Voyager, which began in 1995. During Deep Space Nine's run, various episode novelizations and tie-in video games were produced. After the show ended, various novels and comics continued the adventures of the crew.

== Premise ==
The main setting of Deep Space Nine (DS9) is a space station near the planet Bajor, built by the imperialistic Cardassians during their long, brutal occupation of Bajor. After liberating themselves through a guerrilla war, the Bajorans invite the United Federation of Planets to jointly administer the station. The station is renamed Deep Space Nine, and a mixed Starfleet and Bajoran crew is assigned to manage it, led by Commander Benjamin Sisko.

Shortly after his arrival, Sisko discovers a stable wormhole in Bajoran space between the Alpha Quadrant and the unexplored Gamma Quadrant, and the station is moved near the wormhole's entrance. The wormhole is the home of powerful, noncorporeal aliens whom the Bajorans worship as "the Prophets". Sisko is revered by the Bajorans as the Prophets' "Emissary"; although he is initially uncomfortable with being a religious figure, he gradually grows to accept his role.

Deep Space Nine and Bajor quickly become a center for exploration, interstellar trade, political maneuvering, and finally open conflict. Threats come not only from Cardassians, Klingons, and Romulans from the Alpha Quadrant, but also later from the Dominion, a powerful empire in the Gamma Quadrant ruled by a species of shapeshifters. The starship USS Defiant is assigned to help protect the station. When the Dominion and the Cardassians take up arms against the Federation and its allies starting in the fifth season, Deep Space Nine becomes a key Federation base in the Dominion War.

According to co-creator Berman, he and Piller considered setting the new series on a colony planet, but they decided a space station would appeal more to viewers and would save the money required for a land-based show's on-location shooting. They did not want the show set aboard a starship because Star Trek: The Next Generation (TNG) was still in production, and in Berman's words, it "seemed ridiculous to have two shows—two casts of characters—that were off going where no man has gone before".

While its predecessors tended to restore the status quo ante at the end of each episode, allowing out-of-order viewing, DS9 contains story arcs that span episodes and seasons. One installment often builds upon earlier ones, with several cliffhanger endings. Michael Piller considered this one of the series' best qualities, allowing repercussions of past episodes to influence future events and forcing characters to "learn that actions have consequences." This trend was especially noticeable toward the series finale, by which time the show was intentionally scripted as a serial.

Unlike TNG, interpersonal conflicts were prominently featured in DS9. This was at the suggestion of Star Trek: The Next Generation's writers, many of whom also wrote for DS9, who said that Roddenberry's prohibition of conflicts within the crew restricted their ability to write compelling dramatic stories. In Piller's words, "People who come from different places — honorable, noble people — will naturally have conflicts". The series took a more cynical view of human nature and the United Federation of Planets than the utopian vision presented in TNG, and unlike its predecessor, it featured main characters who were not from the Federation and could offer an alternative perspective.

== Cast ==
=== Main cast ===
Actor	Character	Position	Appearances	Character's species	Rank
Avery Brooks	Benjamin Sisko	Commanding Officer	Seasons 1–7	Human	Commander (Seasons 1–3); Captain (Seasons 3–7)
Avery Brooks	Benjamin Sisko is the Starfleet officer placed in charge of Deep Space Nine. At the start of the series, he is a grieving widower (his wife having been killed by the Borg at the Battle of Wolf 359) and the father of a preteen son, Jake. He and Jadzia Dax discover the Bajoran wormhole, which the Bajorans believe is the home of the Prophets, their gods and protectors. The Bajorans hail Sisko as the Emissary of the Prophets, an exalted religious status that initially makes him uncomfortable, but that he gradually comes to embrace. At the end of the third season, he is promoted to captain, and he eventually becomes a key leader of Federation forces against the Dominion. The seventh season reveals that Sisko's mother was possessed by one of the Prophets long enough to ensure he was born.				
René Auberjonois	Odo	Chief of Security	Seasons 1–7	Changeling	Constable (unofficial)
René Auberjonois	Constable Odo is the station's chief of security. He is a Changeling, a liquid life form capable of assuming any shape he wishes, though he normally takes the form of an adult male humanoid. His origins are initially unknown; he was discovered by the Bajorans some years before the beginning of the series and subjected to painful experimentation until they realized he was sentient. He longs to find his people, but when he finally does, he learns they are the authoritarian rulers of the Dominion. Odo is torn between his longing to be with his people and his opposition to the Dominion's totalitarian imperialism. He comes to love the Bajoran Kira.				
Alexander Siddig	Julian Bashir	Chief Medical Officer	Seasons 1–7	Human	Lieutenant, junior grade (Seasons 1–3); Lieutenant (Seasons 4–7)
Alexander Siddig	Julian Bashir is the station's chief medical officer. Somewhat tactless and arrogant initially, he develops friendships with several of the station's residents, particularly Miles O'Brien and the mysterious Cardassian tailor and ex-spy Garak. Later, his high intelligence and physical skill are revealed to be the result of illegal genetic enhancements his parents obtained for him as a child because he was falling behind his classmates. Siddig was credited as Siddig el Fadil, a shortened form of his birth name, for the first three seasons, before adopting the stage name Alexander Siddig, after discovering that viewers did not know how to pronounce his name. Siddig continued to be credited as Siddig el Fadil when he directed.				
Terry Farrell	Jadzia Dax	Chief Science Officer	Seasons 1–6	Trill	Lieutenant (Seasons 1–3); Lieutenant commander (Seasons 4–6)
Terry Farrell	Jadzia Dax is the station's science officer. A member of the Trill species, the humanoid Jadzia shares a symbiotic existence with a long-living "symbiont" named Dax, who has already experienced seven prior lives "joined" with other Trills. The previous host, Curzon Dax, a larger-than-life diplomat and womanizer, was a mentor and close friend of Sisko's. That friendship is continued with Jadzia, whom Sisko familiarly calls "old man". She marries Worf during the show's sixth season. When Terry Farrell declined to renew her contract at the end of that season, her character was killed off, and Ezri Dax was introduced as Dax's next host.				
Cirroc Lofton	Jake Sisko	Student (Seasons 1–5); Journalist (Seasons 5–7)	Seasons 1–7	Human	Civilian
Cirroc Lofton	Jake is Benjamin Sisko's son. He at first resents the idea of living on an old Cardassian space station, but soon adapts to life on the station and develops a deep friendship with Nog, a Ferengi who is the station's only other resident close to his age. His father wants him to join Starfleet, but Jake yearns to be a writer, eventually becoming a reporter with the Federation News Service. Over the seven seasons, Jake and Nog grow from children into young adults, with storylines showing their rites of passage, successes, and mishaps.				
Colm Meaney	Miles O'Brien	Chief Operations Officer	Seasons 1–7	Human	Senior chief petty officer
Colm Meaney	Miles O'Brien is the chief of operations, responsible for keeping the station in working order. The character originated as a recurring role on TNG; on DS9, he became the first main character on a Star Trek series to be a non-commissioned officer. He and Julian Bashir are close friends. He is married to botanist and teacher Keiko; they have a daughter, Molly, and later a son, Kirayoshi, born in the fifth season. As an "uncomplicated" family man, he is often used by the writers as an "everyman" character struggling with various science-fictional hardships.				
Armin Shimerman	Quark	Bar owner	Seasons 1–7	Ferengi	Civilian
Armin Shimerman	Quark is the proprietor of a bar on DS9. Like most Ferengi, he holds the acquisition of profit to be the highest goal, and his frequently shady moneymaking schemes bring him into conflict with Odo. His cynical, profit-driven worldview is often used as a critique or counterpoint to the idealism of the Federation — although he does display a moral code on occasion, electing to save lives at the cost of profit. Sisko considers Quark an anchor to the merchant community and society in general aboard the station. He pressures Quark not to relocate after the Cardassians are driven out, giving him very generous financial terms to stay and keep his business in operation.				
Nana Visitor	Kira Nerys	First Officer	Seasons 1–7	Bajoran	Major (Seasons 1–6); Colonel (Season 7); Commander (Season 7)
Nana Visitor	Kira Nerys is the Bajoran military's liaison to Deep Space Nine and Sisko's second-in-command. During the Cardassian occupation of Bajor, she was a guerrilla fighter in the Bajoran resistance. She is initially suspicious of the Federation's intentions toward her planet, but grows to trust and befriend the rest of the crew. She is deeply religious, and sometimes finds having the Emissary of the Prophets as her commanding officer to be awkward. Ro Laren, a character from TNG, was the first choice of the producers for Sisko's first officer, but Michelle Forbes did not want to commit to a television series.				
Michael Dorn	Worf	Strategic Operations Officer; First Officer, USS Defiant	Seasons 4–7	Klingon	Lieutenant commander
Michael Dorn	The fourth season had the addition of Dorn to the cast to boost ratings, reprising his role as the Klingon Worf, whom he had played for seven years on TNG. Worf transfers to Deep Space Nine when a brief war between the Federation and the Klingon Empire breaks out and stays on as strategic operations officer and later as a liaison to the Klingon Empire. His character arc centers on negotiating his dual identity as a Klingon and a Starfleet officer. He marries Jadzia Dax in the sixth season.				
Nicole de Boer	Ezri Dax	Counselor	Season 7	Trill	Ensign (Season 7); Lieutenant, junior grade (Season 7)
Nicole de Boer	After the abrupt departure of Terry Farrell, Ezri Dax was added to the series as the next host of the Dax symbiont, a young Trill Starfleet counselor. Unprepared and untrained to be joined, she is often frustrated by aspects of the symbiotic relationship and the eight lifetimes' worth of memories she inherits. She struggles with her memories of Jadzia's love for Worf, as she finds herself attracted to Dr. Bashir.				

=== Supporting cast ===
Actor	Character	Character description	Appearances	Species
Marc Alaimo	Dukat	The former Cardassian prefect of Bajor during the occupation, and later the leader of the Cardassian Union after allying with the Dominion	Seasons 1–7	Cardassian
Aron Eisenberg	Nog	Quark's nephew, a close friend to Jake Sisko, who becomes the first Ferengi to join Starfleet	Seasons 1–7	Ferengi
Max Grodénchik	Rom	Quark's brother and Nog's father, who initially works at Quark's bar before quitting to become a maintenance engineer on Deep Space Nine	Seasons 1–7	Ferengi
Andrew J. Robinson	Elim Garak	A disgraced Cardassian spy living in exile on Deep Space Nine, where he works as a tailor and strikes up a friendship with Bashir	Seasons 1–7	Cardassian
Rosalind Chao	Keiko O'Brien	A botanist who briefly becomes a schoolteacher on Deep Space Nine and then returns to her previous career. She is married to Miles O'Brien.	Seasons 1–7	Human
Wallace Shawn	Zek	Grand Nagus (leader) of the Ferengi Alliance	Seasons 1–3 & 5–7	Ferengi
Philip Anglim	Bareil Antos	A progressive Vedek (a high-ranking Bajoran cleric) who becomes Kira's lover	Seasons 1–3 & 6	Bajoran
Louise Fletcher	Winn Adami	A conniving, ambitious Vedek who is selected to become Kai, the spiritual leader of Bajor	Seasons 1–7	Bajoran
Salome Jens	Female Changeling	Spokesperson for the Founders of the Dominion, who later oversees the war effort in the Alpha Quadrant	Seasons 3–4 and 6–7	Changeling
Kenneth Marshall	Michael Eddington	A Starfleet security officer on Deep Space Nine, who betrays the Federation and joins the Maquis	Seasons 3–5	Human
Robert O'Reilly	Gowron	Chancellor of the Klingon Empire	Seasons 3–5, 7	Klingon
Chase Masterson	Leeta	A "Dabo girl" at Quark's bar, who marries Rom in season 5	Seasons 3–7	Bajoran
Penny Johnson Jerald	Kasidy Yates	A civilian freighter captain who becomes Sisko's love interest	Seasons 3–7	Human
Jeffrey Combs	Brunt	A "liquidator" for the Ferengi Commerce Authority who becomes an antagonist to Quark	Seasons 3–7	Ferengi
Jeffrey Combs	Weyoun	A Dominion administrator, negotiator, and military commander, eventually in charge of the Dominion forces in the Alpha Quadrant. He is replaced several times by clones, as various Weyouns perish.	Seasons 4–7	Vorta
Andrea Martin	Ishka	Quark's mother, a highly successful businesswoman who agitates for civil rights for Ferengi females (who are not allowed to go into business)	Season 3	Ferengi
Cecily Adams	Ishka	Quark's mother, a highly successful businesswoman who agitates for civil rights for Ferengi females (who are not allowed to go into business)	Seasons 5–7	Ferengi
J. G. Hertzler	Martok	An influential Klingon general who commands the Klingon forces in the Dominion War	Seasons 4–7	Klingon
Cyia Batten	Tora Ziyal	Dukat's half-Bajoran daughter	Season 4	Bajoran-Cardassian
Tracy Middendorf	Tora Ziyal	Dukat's half-Bajoran daughter	Season 4	Bajoran-Cardassian
Melanie Smith	Tora Ziyal	Dukat's half-Bajoran daughter	Seasons 5–6	Bajoran-Cardassian
Casey Biggs	Damar	Dukat's aide, who succeeds Dukat as leader of Cardassia and then leads the Cardassian rebellion against the Dominion.	Seasons 4–7	Cardassian
Barry Jenner	William Ross	Commander of Starfleet forces in the Dominion War	Seasons 6–7	Human
James Darren	Vic Fontaine	A holographic simulation of a 1960s Las Vegas lounge singer who offers helpful personal advice and entertainment for the crew.	Seasons 6–7	Hologram

=== Recurring characters ===
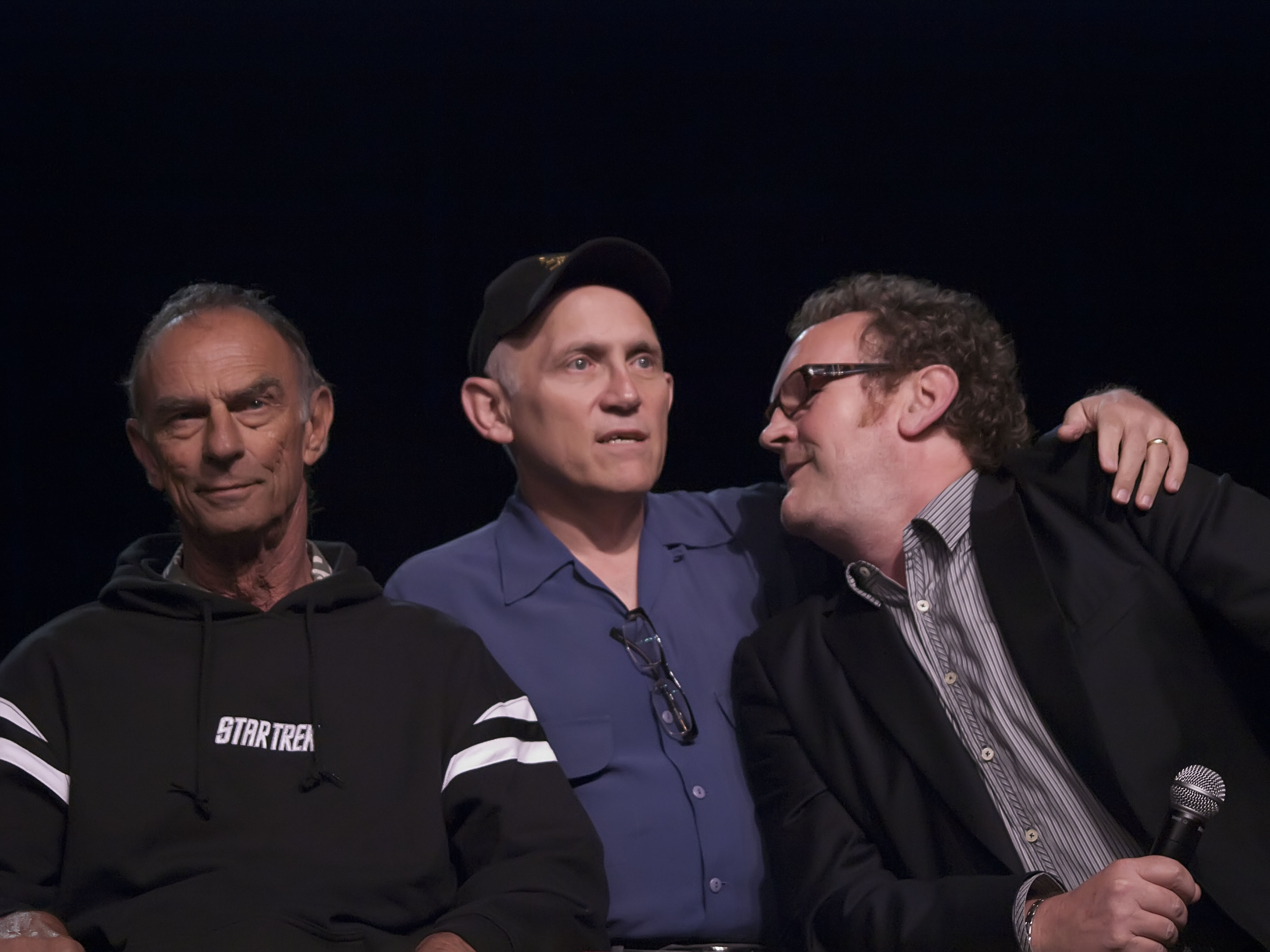
Marc Alaimo, Armin Shimerman, and Colm Meaney, who portrayed the characters of Gul Dukat, Quark, and Miles O'Brien, respectively

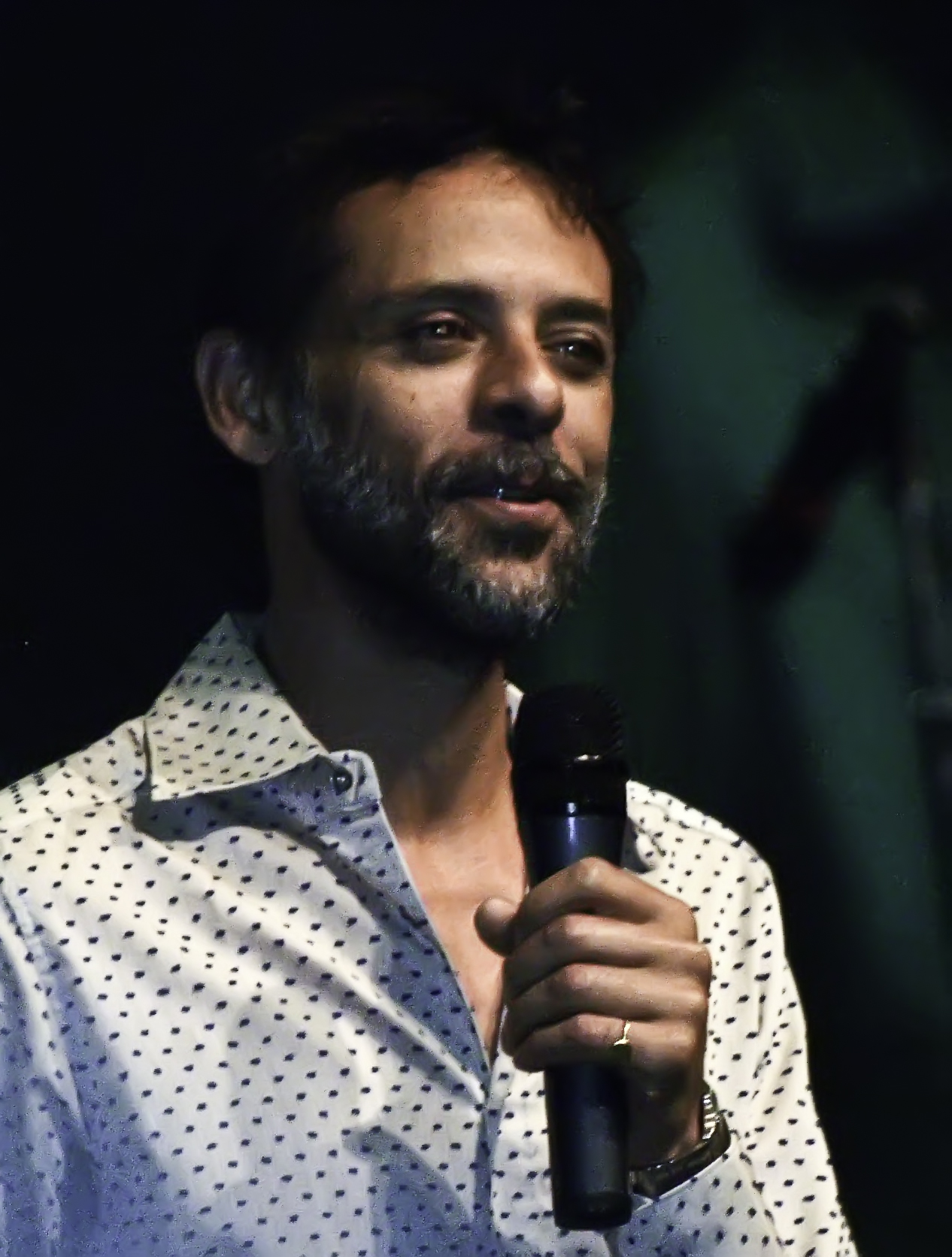
Alexander Siddig portrays Julian Bashir.

The series' setting — a space station rather than a starship — fostered a rich assortment of recurring characters. Not unusually, secondary characters often played as much of a role in an episode as the regular cast, if not more. For example, "The Wire" focused principally on the recurring character Elim Garak, while in "It's Only a Paper Moon", the central characters were Nog and Vic Fontaine, with the regular characters in supporting roles.

Several Cardassian characters figure prominently in DS9, particularly Gul Dukat, a senior member of the Cardassian military involved in the occupation of Bajor, played by Marc Alaimo. A complex character, Dukat undergoes several transformations before ultimately resolving as a profoundly evil character, and Sisko's archenemy, by the show's conclusion. A StarTrek.com article about Star Trek's greatest villains described Gul Dukat as "possibly the most complex and fully-developed bad guy in Star Trek history".

Elim Garak, portrayed by Andrew Robinson, is the only Cardassian who remains on the space station when the Federation and the Bajorans take over. Although he maintains that he is merely a simple tailor, Garak is a former agent of the Obsidian Order, the feared Cardassian secret police; his skills and contacts on Cardassia prove invaluable on several occasions, and he becomes a pivotal figure in the war with the Dominion.

Damar (Casey Biggs) is introduced in the fourth season as an aide to Gul Dukat, and he rises in stature as Dukat regains prominence. He becomes the leader of the Cardassian Union when Dukat has an emotional breakdown, but dissatisfied with Cardassia's relationship with the Dominion, Damar forms and leads an insurgency against the Dominion, playing a vital role in its eventual defeat.

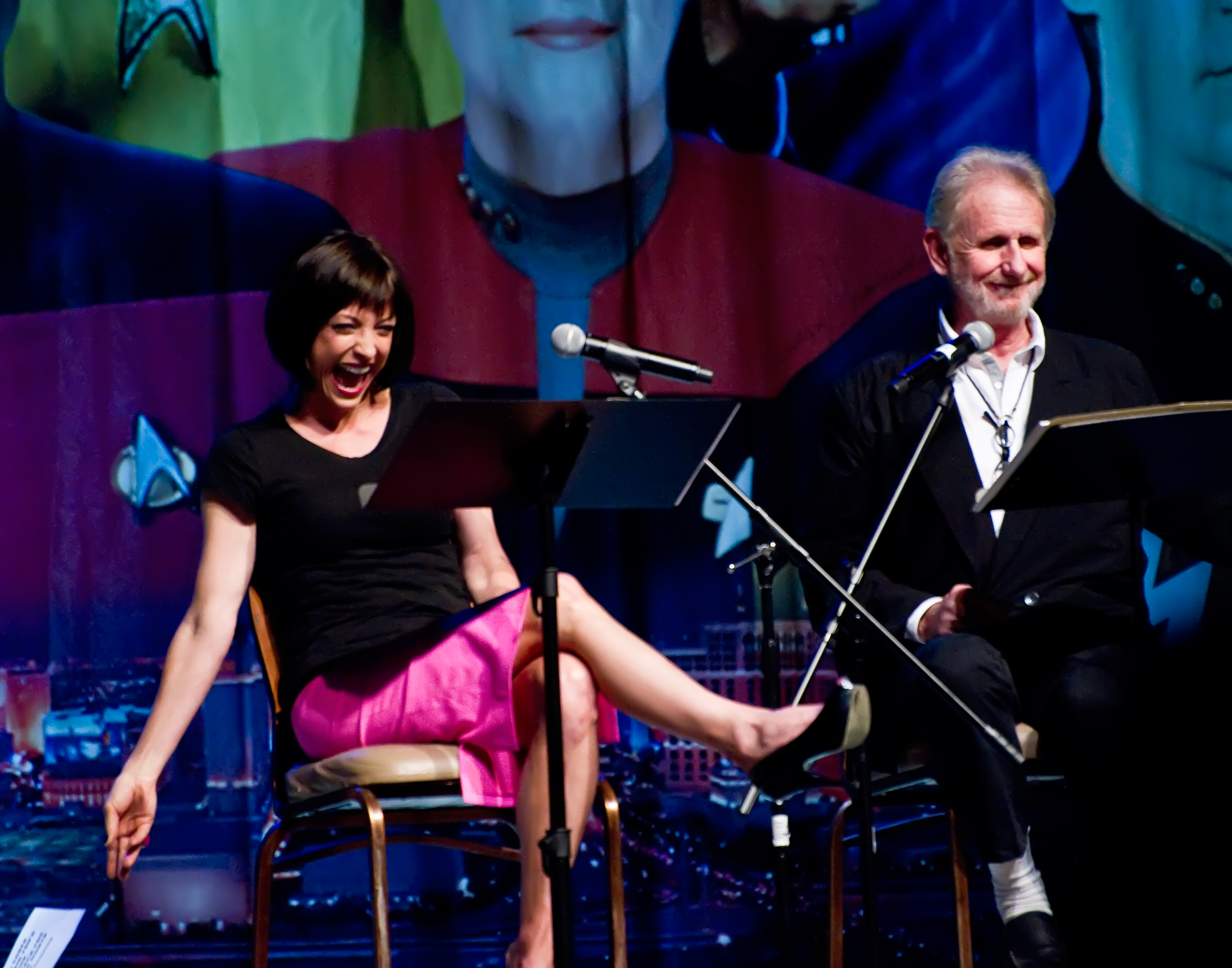
Nana Visitor and René Auberjonois, who portrayed the characters of Kira Nerys and Odo, respectively

Jeffrey Combs has stated that he had auditioned for the role of William Riker on TNG, but when Jonathan Frakes (who won the part) later directed the DS9 episode "Meridian", he recommended Combs for a part. Combs made his Star Trek and DS9 debut as a one-episode alien named Tiron, before being cast as two recurring characters, the Ferengi Brunt and the Vorta Weyoun. He went on to appear in 31 episodes of DS9. In "The Dogs of War", he became one of the few Star Trek actors to play two unrelated roles (Brunt and Weyoun) in the same episode. He later played the recurring role of Shran on Star Trek: Enterprise.

In addition to Quark and his brother Rom (Max Grodénchik), several other Ferengi had recurring roles, including their shrewd mother Ishka (Andrea Martin, later Cecily Adams), who eventually engineers a social revolution on Ferenginar; Rom's son Nog (Aron Eisenberg), the first Ferengi to join Starfleet; and Grand Nagus Zek (Wallace Shawn), the Ferengi leader. The Bajoran character Leeta (Chase Masterson), who works at Quark's bar and later marries Rom, is sometimes involved in the Ferengi storyline.

The Klingon Empire plays a significant role in DS9. Aside from Worf, recurring Klingon characters include Chancellor Gowron (Robert O'Reilly), leader of the Empire, who was introduced on TNG, and General Martok (J. G. Hertzler), a leader of the Klingon forces in the Dominion War, who succeeds Gowron as Chancellor when Gowron is killed by Worf late in the series. Kor, a Klingon character from Star Trek: The Original Series, appears in three DS9 episodes; one of them, "Blood Oath", unites Kor with two other Klingons from the original series: Koloth and Kang. John Colicos, William Campbell, and Michael Ansara reprised their original series roles.

Morn is a minor character who is a fixture in Quark's establishment, sitting at the bar over the course of seven years. It became a running joke that though the other characters remark on how talkative and funny he is, he never speaks a word on camera. Morn did have a line in the script for pilot episode "Emissary", but it was cut due to run-time considerations, after which the creators conceived the joke that he never talks.

== Season overview ==
Star Trek: Deep Space Nine ran for seven seasons, from 1993 to 1999. The first season started half-way through the typical broadcast season running from fall to spring, and had fewer episodes than typical Star Trek runs.

Season	Episodes	Originally released	
Season	Episodes	First released	Last released
1	20	January 3, 1993	June 19, 1993
2	26	September 25, 1993	June 11, 1994
3	26	September 24, 1994	June 17, 1995
4	26	September 30, 1995	June 15, 1996
5	26	September 28, 1996	June 16, 1997
6	26	September 27, 1997	June 13, 1998
7	26	September 30, 1998	June 2, 1999

== Plot elements ==
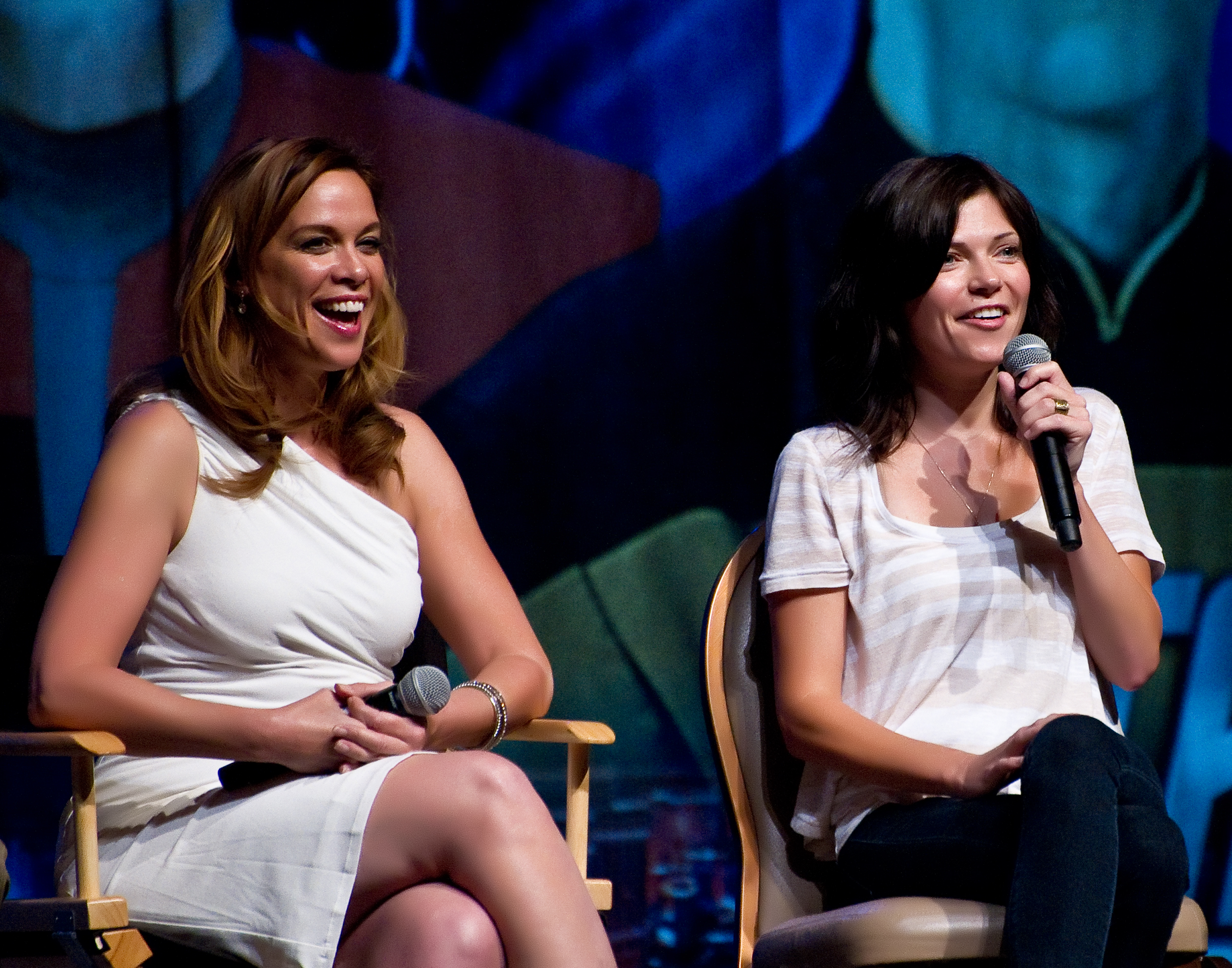
Chase Masterson (left) portrayed the recurring character Leeta on the series; Nicole De Boer (right) played Ezri Dax, a main character introduced in the seventh season.

Major plotlines focus on several key Star Trek cultures, especially interactions between the Bajorans, Cardassians, Ferengi, Klingons, and the Federation. Each of these cultures is represented by major characters in the main or recurring cast.

Major arcs revolve around Bajor's recovery from Cardassian occupation; the Maquis, a rebellious Federation splinter group; and the Dominion, a hostile imperial power from the other side of the galaxy. The war between the Dominion and the Federation spans the show's last two seasons, after tensions between the two gradually increase from the beginning of the third season. Throughout the series, loyalties and alliances change repeatedly: pacts with the Cardassians are made, broken, and remade; a short war with the Klingons flares up and is settled; Bajor grows into political stability; and formerly neutral powers are drawn into conflict.

=== Bajor ===
In the first episode, Starfleet Commander Benjamin Sisko arrives at Deep Space Nine, a space station formerly operated by the Cardassians during their oppressive occupation of the planet Bajor. He is assigned to run the station jointly with the newly liberated Bajorans as they recover from the Cardassian occupation, to help pave the way for Bajor's entry into the Federation. Sisko and Jadzia Dax stumble upon a wormhole leading to the distant Gamma Quadrant, and discover that it is inhabited by beings not bound by normal space and time. To the strongly religious people of Bajor, the wormhole aliens are their gods (the Bajoran Prophets), and the wormhole itself is the long-prophesied Celestial Temple. Sisko is hailed as the Emissary of the Prophets, through whom the Prophets act.

Bajor's politics and religion, and Sisko's status within it, provide the basis for long-lasting story arcs. Early seasons show Bajor reckoning with the aftermath of occupation and establishing itself as a democracy. Meanwhile, Sisko initially considers his role as a religious icon with discomfort and skepticism, striving to keep his role as station commander distinct from any religious obligations that the Bajorans try to place on him. Later, he becomes more accepting of his role and, by the end of the series, he openly embraces it. He is often called upon to choose between his role as Emissary and his duties to Starfleet, as when he persuades the Bajorans to withdraw their application for Federation membership after receiving a vision from the Prophets. The political and religious implications of Sisko's status for Bajor and its spiritual leaders (most notably, Winn Adami) provide a central arc that lasts until the end of the series.

=== The Maquis ===
The station crew early on contends with a resistance group known as the Maquis. Rooted in the events of The Next Generation episode "Journey's End", in which Native American settlers refuse to leave when their planet is given to Cardassia as part of a treaty, the Maquis are an example of the show's exploration of darker themes; its members are Federation citizens who take up arms against Cardassia in defense of their homes, and some, such as Calvin Hudson, a long-time friend of Sisko's, and Michael Eddington, who defects while serving aboard the station, are Starfleet officers. The show's critique of traditional Star Trek themes can be seen in episodes such as "For the Cause", in which Eddington compares the Federation to the implacable alien hive mind known as the Borg: "At least [the Borg] tell you about their plans for assimilation. You assimilate people and they don't even know it."

=== The Dominion War ===
The second-season episode "Rules of Acquisition" marks the first mention of the Dominion, a ruthless empire in the Gamma Quadrant, though they are not fully introduced until the second-season finale, "The Jem'Hadar". It is led by "the Founders", a race of shape-shifting Changelings, the same species as DS9's security chief, Odo. They were once persecuted by non-shapeshifters (whom they call "solids") and they seek to impose "order" upon any who could potentially harm them, which includes nearly all solids. The Founders have created or genetically modified races to serve them: their sly diplomats and administrators, the Vorta, and their fearless shock troops, the Jem'Hadar. These races worship the Founders as gods.

At the start of DS9's third season ("The Search"), with the threat of a Dominion attack looming from the other side of the wormhole, the USS Defiant, a prototype warship, is stationed at Deep Space Nine, providing an avenue for plot lines away from the station. With the third season, writers from the now-completed The Next Generation began to write regularly for DS9.

In the show's middle seasons, the Dominion foments discord to weaken the Alpha Quadrant powers, manipulating the Klingons into war with the Cardassians, and almost inciting a coup d'état on Earth. In the fifth-season episode "By Inferno's Light", the Dominion annexes Cardassia, and goes to war with the other major powers of the Alpha Quadrant in the season finale "Call to Arms". The Dominion War tests Starfleet's commitment to its ethics; when the formerly neutral Romulans are persuaded to ally themselves with the Federation ("In the Pale Moonlight"), it occurs only through criminal and duplicitous acts on Sisko's part. This provides an example of the moral ambiguity prevalent in DS9 in comparison to the other Star Trek series.

=== Section 31 ===
Another example of DS9's darker nature is the introduction of Section 31, a secret organization dedicated to preserving the Federation way of life at any cost. This shadowy group, introduced in "Inquisition", justifies its unlawful, unilateral tactics by claiming that it is essential to the continued existence of the Federation. Section 31 features prominently in several episodes of the Dominion War arc, especially as it is revealed that it attempted a genocide of the Founders.

=== The Ferengi ===
In DS9, the Ferengi are no longer an enemy of the Federation, but rather an economic power whose political neutrality is mostly respected. Several episodes explore their capitalistic nature, while others delve into the race's sexist social norms. Unlike their depiction in Star Trek: The Next Generation, where they were generally portrayed as sexist buffoons, in DS9, they received a more complex depiction. Some Ferengi characters seek life paths outside the pursuit of profit, such as Nog, who becomes the first Ferengi to join Starfleet; others attempt to reform Ferengi society from within, such as Ishka, who leads a women's-rights revolution on the Ferengi homeworld, and Rom, who leads a strike against unfair working conditions in Quark's bar.

=== The Mirror Universe ===
Several episodes of DS9 explore the Mirror Universe, first introduced in the Star Trek: The Original Series episode "Mirror, Mirror". In the second-season episode "Crossover", Kira and Dr. Bashir are accidentally sent to the Mirror Universe and discover that it is dominated by a ruthless Klingon–Cardassian alliance and Terrans (humans) are slaves. Over the course of four Mirror Universe episodes of DS9, the Terran workers form a resistance movement and eventually liberate themselves ("Through the Looking Glass", "Shattered Mirror", "Resurrection", and "The Emperor's New Cloak").

== Production ==
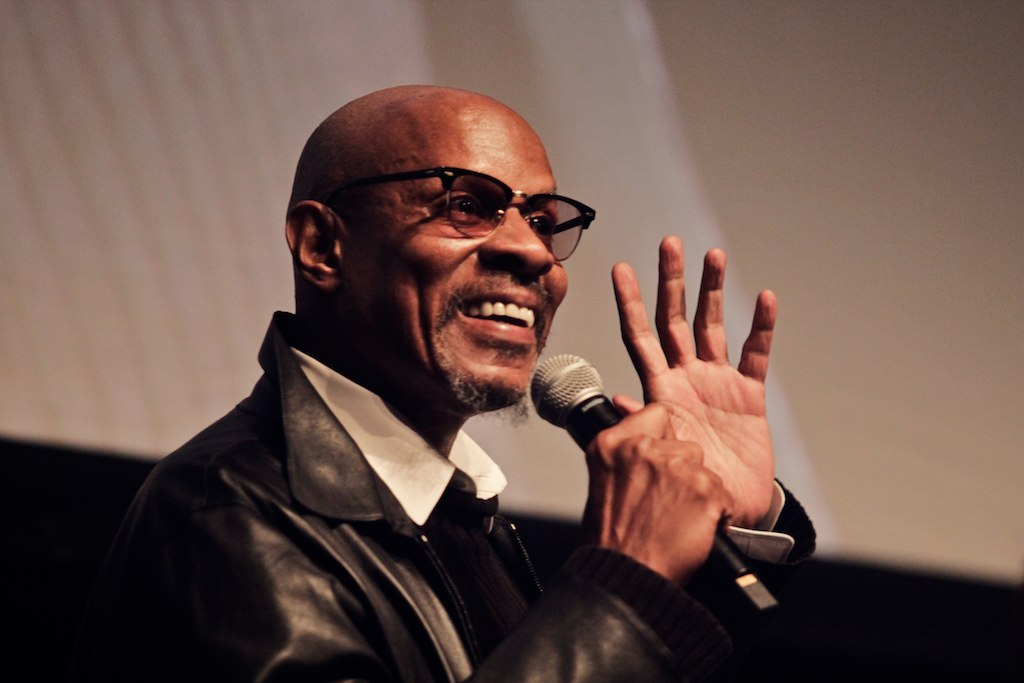
Avery Brooks directed several episodes in addition to his lead role of Sisko.

The series was created by Rick Berman and Michael Piller at the request of Brandon Tartikoff and was produced by Paramount Television. The original Star Trek series had been pitched as the science-fiction equivalent to television Westerns such as Wagon Train, and DS9 was instead analogous to shows like The Rifleman, featuring a town or trading post right on the edge of the frontier. As overall head of Star Trek production, Berman served as executive producer for the entire series. Piller initially served as second executive producer and showrunner, but left the series in 1995 to manage Star Trek: Voyager. Writer Ira Steven Behr was promoted by Berman to replace Piller as showrunner and held that role for the remainder of the series. In addition to Berman, Piller, and Behr, key writers included Robert Hewitt Wolfe, Ronald D. Moore, Peter Allan Fields, Bradley Thompson, David Weddle, Hans Beimler, and René Echevarria.

Several actors also directed episodes, including Avery Brooks, who directed and starred in the critically acclaimed episode "Far Beyond the Stars".

DS9 was the first television series in the Star Trek franchise to use computer-generated imagery (CGI) for exterior space shots. Although a few other television series, such as Babylon 5, were using CGI exclusively to avoid the high expense of model photography, the Star Trek franchise continued to primarily use physical models for exterior space shots because producers decided models provided more realism. DS9 continued using models where needed, such as the fourth-season premiere and the alternate-universe episode "Shattered Mirror". During the battle sequences between the Federation and Klingon fleets, the effects department used Playmates toys, Ertl model kits, and Hallmark Bird-of-Prey Christmas ornaments in the background to keep production costs down.

The USS Defiant was the first full-fledged starship in the Star Trek franchise to have a CGI model used in regular production. It was first built and animated by VisionArt, which was responsible for the morphing of Odo. The CGI Defiant was featured heavily in the fourth-season episode "Starship Down", where it battled a CGI Jem'Hadar ship in a CGI gas giant's atmosphere.

The series started using Foundation Imaging and Digital Muse in 1997 (seasons 6 and 7) for its effects as part of the ongoing storyline of the Dominion occupation of the station. The station itself remained a physical model throughout the series' seven-year run, except for the final scene of the series. In October 2006, the physical model of the station was sold for $132,000 in an auction at Christie's auction house in New York City.

The opening sequence was likewise modified in the fourth season, most notably by the introduction of CGI inserts of construction work being performed on the station's exterior by suited maintenance crews, and more docking and launching activity by ships, along with subtle colored wisps of nebulae added to the background starfield. Accordingly, the solo trumpet (preceded by a solo French horn) featured prominently in the main theme by Dennis McCarthy to accentuate the isolation of the outpost was augmented by a chorus of brass as the station attained a more bustling atmosphere following the presence of the wormhole.

The digital effects were rendered in standard definition and while the series could be released in a high-definition format, the studio preferred recreating the visual effects, rather than upscaling them.

== Episodes ==
Overall, 176 episodes of Star Trek: Deep Space Nine were produced, with an average run time of 43 minutes each. Geek.com calculated 126 hours of total viewing time for the series.

The show debuted in January 1993 with the double episode "Emissary", half-way through the sixth season of The Next Generation. This is the first time that two Star Trek franchise series aired concurrently, which continued until DS9 ended in 1999, except for late 1994, when Next Generation ended and DS9 was alone on the air. The next year, though, Star Trek: Voyager aired on the then-new United Paramount Network (UPN) so once again two shows from the franchise aired.

The most acclaimed episodes of DS9 include: "In the Pale Moonlight", in which Sisko wrestles with compromising his ethics to win the Dominion War; "The Visitor", in which an elderly Jake Sisko tries desperately to undo the loss of his father; and "Far Beyond the Stars", in which Sisko has a vision of himself as a writer coping with racism in 20th-century New York.

Episodes by season (1–4)
Season 1	Season 2	Season 3	Season 4
1. "Emissary" (2-part episode); 3. "Past Prologue"; 4. "A Man Alone"; 5. "Babel"; 6. "Captive Pursuit"; 7. "Q-Less"; 8. "Dax"; 9. "The Passenger"; 10. "Move Along Home"; 11. "The Nagus"; 12. "Vortex"; 13. "Battle Lines"; 14. "The Storyteller"; 15. "Progress"; 16. "If Wishes Were Horses"; 17. "The Forsaken"; 18. "Dramatis Personae"; 19. "Duet"; 20. "In the Hands of the Prophets"	1. "The Homecoming"; 2. "The Circle"; 3. "The Siege"; 4. "Invasive Procedures"; 5. "Cardassians"; 6. "Melora"; 7. "Rules of Acquisition"; 8. "Necessary Evil"; 9. "Second Sight"; 10. "Sanctuary"; 11. "Rivals"; 12. "The Alternate"; 13. "Armageddon Game"; 14. "Whispers"; 15. "Paradise"; 16. "Shadowplay"; 17. "Playing God"; 18. "Profit and Loss"; 19. "Blood Oath"; 20. "The Maquis, Part I"; 21. "The Maquis, Part II"; 22. "The Wire"; 23. "Crossover"; 24. "The Collaborator"; 25. "Tribunal"; 26. "The Jem'Hadar"	1. "The Search, Part I"; 2. "The Search, Part II"; 3. "The House of Quark"; 4. "Equilibrium"; 5. "Second Skin"; 6. "The Abandoned"; 7. "Civil Defense"; 8. "Meridian"; 9. "Defiant"; 10. "Fascination"; 11. "Past Tense, Part I"; 12. "Past Tense, Part II"; 13. "Life Support"; 14. "Heart of Stone"; 15. "Destiny"; 16. "Prophet Motive"; 17. "Visionary"; 18. "Distant Voices"; 19. "Through the Looking Glass"; 20. "Improbable Cause " 21. "The Die is Cast"; 22. "Explorers"; 23. "Family Business"; 24. "Shakaar"; 25. "Facets"; 26. "The Adversary"	1. "The Way of the Warrior" (2-part episode); 3. "The Visitor"; 4. "Hippocratic Oath"; 5. "Indiscretion"; 6. "Rejoined"; 7. "Little Green Men"; 8. "Starship Down"; 9. "The Sword of Kahless"; 10. "Our Man Bashir"; 11. "Homefront"; 12. "Paradise Lost"; 13. "Crossfire"; 14. "Return to Grace"; 15. "Sons of Mogh"; 16. "Bar Association"; 17. "Accession"; 18. "Rules of Engagement"; 19. "Hard Time"; 20. "Shattered Mirror"; 21. "The Muse"; 22. "For the Cause"; 23. "To the Death"; 24. "The Quickening"; 25. "Body Parts"; 26. "Broken Link"

Episodes by season (5–7)
Season 5	Season 6	Season 7
1. "Apocalypse Rising"; 2. "The Ship"; 3. "Looking for par'Mach in All the Wrong Places"; 4. "...Nor the Battle to the Strong"; 5. "The Assignment"; 6. "Trials and Tribble-ations"; 7. "Let He Who Is Without Sin..."; 8. "Things Past"; 9. "The Ascent"; 10. "Rapture"; 11. "The Darkness and the Light"; 12. "The Begotten"; 13. "For the Uniform"; 14. "In Purgatory's Shadow"; 15. "By Inferno's Light"; 16. "Doctor Bashir, I Presume?"; 17. "A Simple Investigation"; 18. "Business as Usual"; 19. "Ties of Blood and Water"; 20. "Ferengi Love Songs"; 21. "Soldiers of the Empire"; 22. "Children of Time"; 23. "Blaze of Glory"; 24. "Empok Nor"; 25. "In the Cards"; 26. "Call to Arms"	1. "A Time to Stand"; 2. "Rocks and Shoals"; 3. "Sons and Daughters"; 4. "Behind the Lines"; 5. "Favor the Bold"; 6. "Sacrifice of Angels"; 7. "You Are Cordially Invited"; 8. "Resurrection"; 9. "Statistical Probabilities"; 10. "The Magnificent Ferengi"; 11. "Waltz"; 12. "Who Mourns for Morn?"; 13. "Far Beyond the Stars"; 14. "One Little Ship"; 15. "Honor Among Thieves"; 16. "Change of Heart"; 17. "Wrongs Darker Than Death or Night"; 18. "Inquisition"; 19. "In the Pale Moonlight"; 20. "His Way"; 21. "The Reckoning"; 22. "Valiant"; 23. "Profit and Lace"; 24. "Time's Orphan"; 25. "The Sound of Her Voice"; 26. "Tears of the Prophets"	1. "Image in the Sand"; 2. "Shadows and Symbols"; 3. "Afterimage"; 4. "Take Me Out to the Holosuite"; 5. "Chrysalis"; 6. "Treachery, Faith and the Great River"; 7. "Once More unto the Breach"; 8. "The Siege of AR-558"; 9. "Covenant"; 10. "It's Only a Paper Moon"; 11. "Prodigal Daughter"; 12. "The Emperor's New Cloak"; 13. "Field of Fire"; 14. "Chimera"; 15. "Badda-Bing Badda-Bang"; 16. "Inter Arma Enim Silent Leges"; 17. "Penumbra"; 18. "'Til Death Do Us Part"; 19. "Strange Bedfellows"; 20. "The Changing Face of Evil"; 21. "When It Rains..."; 22. "Tacking Into the Wind"; 23. "Extreme Measures"; 24. "The Dogs of War"; 25. "What You Leave Behind" (2-part finale)

== Reception ==
Although DS9's ratings remained solid, it was never as successful as the syndicated Star Trek: The Next Generation. One factor was the minimal promotion for DS9, as Paramount focused its efforts on its flagship network series Star Trek: Voyager.

=== Critical reception ===
DS9 was well received by critics, with TV Guide describing it as "the best acted, written, produced, and altogether finest" Star Trek series. Though debuting in the shadow of The Next Generation, DS9 achieved a considerable level of success in its own right. According to a press release through Newswire on April 7, 1999, it was the #1 syndicated show in the United States for adults 18–49 and 25–54. The characters of DS9 were featured on the cover of TV Guide ten times during its run, including several "special issue" editions in which a set of four versions with different covers was printed.

The series was bestowed with a number of award nominations and awards. DS9 earned 31 Emmy Award nominations during its run, including for makeup, cinematography, art direction, special effects, hairstyling, music (direction and composition), and costumes. Of these, it won two for makeup (for "Captive Pursuit" and "Distant Voices"), one for special visual effects (for "Emissary"), and one for its main title theme music (by composer Dennis McCarthy). DS9 was also nominated for two Hugo Awards in the category of Best Dramatic Presentation for "The Visitor" and "Trials and Tribble-ations".

Deep Space Nine drew praise from African-American, Latino, and other minority viewers for its handling of the minority characters, particularly the Sisko family members. In addition, actor Alexander Siddig (who portrayed Dr. Bashir) expressed his enthusiasm for the fact that he, with his English accent, unusual screen name at the time of casting (Siddig El Fadil), and North African heritage, was a main character on a prominent television series, despite not being as easily racially identifiable to audiences as many other TV actors and characters were at the time.

Andrew J. Robinson commented on DS9 not being as popular as its predecessors: "It's not the most popular because it's the most morally ambiguous... Whenever you have characters who are gray rather than black and white... Although they are more interesting, they are more difficult for people to get a handle on. I loved DS9 because they were gray because the characters were not easily definable, but that's not for everybody".

Author Terry J. Erdmann commented: "DS9 was never as popular as its two predecessors, although it arguably was a more critically acclaimed series". In 2018, IndieWire ranked Star Trek: Deep Space Nine as the third-best science-fiction show set in outer space, while placing Star Trek (1966–1969) in eighth place and Star Trek: The Next Generation (1987–1994) in 12th place among other shows in this genre, including 18 overall.

In 2016, The Washington Post called the Dominion war arc possibly the "richest narrative" of the Star Trek universe, though the arc's only standout episode is "In the Pale Moonlight", which it ranked the fourth-best episode of all Star Trek for highlighting the moral confusion and compromises that can occur during war. In 2016, the Los Angeles Times ranked DS9 third of all Star Trek films and TV series. In 2017, Vulture ranked it the best live-action Star Trek television show. In 2019, Popular Mechanics ranked it the 16th-best science-fiction television show ever. In 2021, Variety ranked it ninth among Star Trek film and television series. In 2021, Empire ranked it the 46th-greatest television show ever, saying its seasons-long character and story arcs make it good for binge-watching.

=== Former cast members and staff ===
In a 2007 interview with If Magazine, George Takei, who had played the character Hikaru Sulu in The Original Series, criticized DS9 for being the polar opposite of Gene Roddenberry's philosophy and vision of the future. Writer D. C. Fontana thought that as a World War II veteran Roddenberry would have appreciated the show and its dark themes. Bjo Trimble, one of the major forces behind the letter-writing campaign that helped renew The Original Series for its third season, commented that she thought Roddenberry would have "come to like DS9, had he lived to see it", and that "the only reason there were not full battles in early Star Trek is lack of funds to pull it off, and lack of technology to show it. Otherwise, GR would certainly have added it; he knew what audiences liked".

Roddenberry is quoted in The Making of Star Trek DS9 as having doubts that a non-exploration show could work, and being displeased with early concepts presented to him in 1991. However, Rick Berman stated in the Star Trek: Deep Space Nine Companion that Roddenberry had given him his blessing for developing it close to his death.

At the Shore Leave 14 convention in July 1992, Majel Barrett commented on Roddenberry's involvement: "He knew about it, but he was not about to become involved. He had done what he wanted to do and that was it. He just wished them Godspeed and go ahead. And as long as the name Star Trek is on it, yes, the estate will have a part of the action."

Ronald D. Moore, one of the series' main writers (who previously wrote for Star Trek: The Next Generation and went on to create the re-imagined Battlestar Galactica), praised the show as the "ultimate achievement for the [Star Trek] franchise" in 2002:

I think Deep Space [Nine] was the show that really took Star Trek as far as you could take it. You have The Original Series which is a sort of a landmark, it changes everything about the way science fiction is presented on television, at least space-based science fiction. Then you have Next Generation, which for all of its legitimate achievements, is still a riff on the original. It's still sort of like, ok, it's another star ship and it's another captain – it's different, but it's still a riff on the original. Here comes Deep Space [Nine] and it just runs the table in a different way. It just says ok, you think you know what Star Trek is, let's put it on a space station, and let's make it darker. Let's make it a continuing story, and let's continually challenge your assumptions about what this American icon means. And I think it was the ultimate achievement for the franchise. Personally, I think it's the best of all of them; I think it's an amazing piece of work.

=== Scholarly reception ===
J. Emmett Winn, in his discussion of the portrayal of Ferengi, criticized the show for "perpetuat[ing] racial stereotypes and promot[ing] mainstream cultural assimilation as a noble, desirable quest and as the correct way for the racialized 'other' to exist".

Since the end of the series, many other scholars have addressed a variety of aspects of the show, including Victor Grech's analysis of the Cardassians as representing Nazis; Douglas Cowan's chapter looking at religion in science fiction "Heeding the Prophet's Call: Star Trek: Deep Space Nine"; and Roger A. Sneed's The Dreamer and The Dream: Afrofuturism and Black Religious Thought and Lisa Doris Alexander's article "Far Beyond the Stars: The Framing of Blackness in Star Trek: Deep Space Nine", both of which address the way Deep Space Nine broke new ground in depicting race in science fiction.

== Babylon 5 controversy ==
Babylon 5, another science-fiction series with a similar premise, set on a space station, aired around the same period as Deep Space Nine. Babylon 5 creator J. Michael Straczynski indicated that Paramount Television was aware of his concept as early as 1989, when he attempted to sell the show to the studio and provided them with the series bible, pilot script, artwork, lengthy character background histories, and plot synopses for 22 "or so planned episodes taken from the overall course of the planned series".

Paramount declined to produce Babylon 5, but later announced that Deep Space Nine was in development, two months after Warner Bros. announced its plans for Babylon 5. Straczynski stated that though he was confident that Deep Space Nine showrunners Rick Berman and Michael Piller had not seen this material, he suspected that Paramount executives used his bible and scripts to steer the development of Deep Space Nine. He and Warner Bros did not file suit against Paramount, largely because Straczynski did not see it as a productive option, with negative repercussions for both TV series. In 1993, he responded to a Deep Space Nine fan who saw the lack of legal action as proof that Straczynski's allegation was unfounded with: "If there is any (to use your term) winking and nudging going on, it's on the level of 'Okay, YOU (Paramount) know what happened, and *I* know what happened, but let's try to be grownup about it for now,' though I must say that the shapechanging thing nearly tipped me back over the edge again. If there are no more major similarities that crop up in the next few weeks or months, with luck we can continue that way."

== Music ==
On June 30, 1993, between seasons one and two, DS9 followed the example of other Star Trek series in releasing the original score from its pilot episode on CD. The title theme was also made available as a CD single. Music from several other episodes is included on The Best of Star Trek releases.

Created in the hope that Frank Sinatra Jr. would take the role, the character Vic Fontaine (instead played by 1960s heart-throb James Darren) was introduced in the sixth-season episode "His Way". The character was a self-aware holographic Las Vegas lounge singer and nightclub owner from the early 1960s. Vic was popular with the station's crew and performed many period songs by, among others, Frank Sinatra and Nat King Cole. Darren's role allowed him to release This One's from the Heart on August 24, 1999, featuring songs that Vic sang in the show and other period pieces.

On February 12, 2013, La La Land Records released a limited-edition, four-disc soundtrack collection entitled the Star Trek: Deep Space Nine Collection. The discs contain various cues from episodes scored by Dennis McCarthy, Jay Chattaway, David Bell, Paul Baillargeon, John Debney, Richard Bellis and Gregory Smith. Only 3000 copies of the collection were printed.

== Home media ==
Episodes of DS9 were made available on VHS cassettes. The series was released on VHS in the United Kingdom starting August 2, 1993. Each video cassette contained two episodes and unique artwork and character/plot information. The first VHS release in the United States came on November 19, 1996.

Beginning in 1996, DS9 began releases on LaserDisc. Picture and sound quality in this format was significantly better than that of VHS cassettes; however, the Laserdisc format was discontinued in 1997. Only 30 discs, or the first 60 episodes, were released, comprising the first, second, and part of the third season before Pioneer halted its production of Star Trek discs in October 1999. DS9 LaserDiscs were also produced for the Japanese and European markets. In Japan, the first five seasons were released in a series of 10 boxed sets (two per season) before they were canceled around the same time as the US releases. In Europe, a select few DS9 episodes were released on PAL laserdisc: "Emissary", also included in the boxed set Star Trek: The Pilots; "The Way of the Warrior", parts 1 and 2; and "Trials and Tribble-ations" from DS9, "The Trouble with Tribbles" from Star Trek: The Original Series and "More Tribbles, More Troubles" from Star Trek: The Animated Series.

Following the DVD release of Star Trek: The Next Generation in 2002, DS9 was released on DVD beginning in February 2003. DS9 was released in boxed sets of one season each, which were released about one month apart. Each season contains several "special features", including a biographical look at a main character, information from make-up designer Michael Westmore on how various aliens were created, and interviews with cast and crew members.

The sets also include "Section 31" easter eggs that give a brief look at other aspects of the series. The Region 2 and 4 DVDs also came with bonus CD-ROM discs that allow users to build a "virtual" DS9 on their computers with each release (this software can no longer be installed, as the online registration is no longer available). On October 26, 2004, a boxed set of all seven seasons was also released.

In 2017, the complete series was released on a DVD box set, with 176 episodes on 48 discs; the set also included a variety of extras that was the same as those on the 2003 box set. An example of bonus content is a featurette "Deep Space Nine: A Bold New Beginning".

== What We Left Behind: Looking Back at Star Trek: Deep Space Nine ==
In 2017, Ira Steven Behr announced he had reconvened much of the former cast and crew of Star Trek: Deep Space Nine for a documentary film entitled What We Left Behind (eventually released as What We Left Behind: Looking Back at Star Trek: Deep Space Nine). It had a very positive response and surpassed its fundraising goals, and this success led to ground-breaking conversions of Deep Space Nine footage into higher definition, although it caused some delays. A screening version was released in late 2018 in Hollywood, in New York City, and at the Destination Star Trek convention in the UK.

By February 2017, the documentary was partially finished, with an Indiegogo fundraising page set up to crowdsource the rest of the money needed to complete it. In addition to interviews with cast and crew, the documentary explored Deep Space Nine's legacy; Behr also reconvened the series' old writers' room to develop a script for the first episode of an imagined eighth season, which featured in the film. In 2017, a tentative release date was set for 2018. In the summer of 2018, the makers scheduled special release events starting in October 2018. A version was able to be screened at these special release events at Paramount in Hollywood and some other locations, but a decision was made to delay the media release to increase the number of high-definition conversions.

In 2017, a fundraiser for the documentary surpassed its target of nearly $150,000 within a day of going live. It went on to raise over $500,000 by March 2017. When it concluded, it had raised over $631,000 from thousands of donations.

Development of What We Left Behind took extra time due in part to the large amount of material for editing and technical challenges. This includes crafting special-effects footage and working with CBS to make high-definition scans. The makers also expanded the amount of footage that was remastered and innovated with a 16:9 scan of the original DS9 film.

In August 2018, it was announced that the documentary would have original music scored by Star Trek veterans Dennis McCarthy (256 Star Trek episodes scored) and Kevin Kiner (10 Star Trek episodes scored). The documentary's producer was Kai de Mello-Folsom, in consultation with others from the original creative team including Michael Okuda, Jonathan West, and Doug Drexler.

What We Left Behind: Looking Back at Star Trek: Deep Space Nine premiered in late 2018 at these locations:

- Los Angeles, October 12
- New York City, October 14
- Birmingham, UK, October 20, during the Destination Star Trek convention

The strong community support and overall response, as well as the creative team's access to resources to create the high-definition sequences, led to a delay to increase the sequences filmed in higher definition for the documentary. Although the screening version was complete and could have been released as-is, a creative decision was made to undertake converting more sequences into high definition. One teaser showed concept art of a Star Trek spacecraft, which appears in the documentary in an animated sequence. The spacecraft design was by John Eaves, who designed many spacecraft in the franchise's television shows and theatrical films.

On May 13, 2019, a limited theatrical version was released. It played at about 800 theaters and grossed over $380,000. The film reviewed various aspects of the series from a perspective of 20 years later, explored a plot for a notional eighth season and included many clips rescanned from original footage in high definition.

On Rotten Tomatoes, it has an approval rating of 100% based on reviews from nine critics.

== Books ==
Pocket Books has published several dozen books based on DS9. Some of these were novelizations of memorable episodes, such as "Emissary", "The Search", and "What You Leave Behind", which were usually published a few days after the episode aired in the United States. Several novels were part of "crossover" series between the Star Trek franchises, while others were part of other franchises, but dealt with events laid out in DS9. For example, The Battle of Betazed tells of how Deanna Troi attempted to resist the Dominion occupation of her world (mentioned in the episode "In the Pale Moonlight"). Most focus on the station and its crew, with a notable exception being Ira Steven Behr and Robert Hewitt Wolfe's Legends of the Ferengi.

The "Millennium" series by Judith and Garfield Reeves-Stevens, published by Pocket Books beginning in 2000, consists of The Fall of Terok Nor (book 1), The War of the Prophets (book 2), and Inferno (book 3). The series lays out an alternate ending to DS9 (the novels were written before the series concluded) in which a second wormhole is created by the actions of a number of shady characters, destroying the station. In the space-time distortion that occurs, most of the crew are transported 25 years into the future - in which the Federation and its allies are virtually crushed, and a fanatical sect of Bajorans who worships the Pah-wraiths have ascended to power and plan to destroy the universe to bring about a higher state of existence. Inferno ends the series, as an unexpected mode of time travel is discovered after the end of the universe, allowing the DS9 crew to alter past events.

Avatar, a two-part novel published on May 1, 2001, picked up where the series left off. It began season eight of DS9, into which A Stitch in Time (a biographical look at the life of Garak, written by Andrew Robinson himself) was incorporated retroactively. The events of "What You Leave Behind", DS9's series finale, caused some radical changes to occur in season eight. As Benjamin Sisko had entered the Celestial Temple, Colonel Kira was given command of the station, while a new commander named Elias Vaughn took over her position, Garak became the leader of postwar Cardassia, Odo helped the Changelings rebuild, and Rom presided over the Ferengi Alliance.

Other publications, such as the Deep Space Nine Technical Manual and Deep Space Nine Companion, are common to most of the Trek series. The DS9 Companion contains detailed episode guides and interviews with actors, writers, directors, and other staff members.

DS9 series influences were included in role-playing game reference books from Last Unicorn Games and Decipher, Inc. Additionally, several novels have also been released in audio form, narrated by René Auberjonois and Armin Shimerman, among others.

=== Comics ===
Outside its line of novels, DS9 has been the subject of several comic books published by Malibu Comics, Wildstorm Comics, Marvel Comics, and IDW. One—Marvel's Starfleet Academy—is a spin-off detailing Nog's experiences as a cadet at the title academy in San Francisco. Another DS9 comic series became an example of licensed Star Trek works influencing each other as Tiris Jast, a major character from Wildstorm's N-Vector, appeared in the novel Avatar, Book One.

== Games ==
Several video games focus on DS9. The first is Crossroads of Time, a 1995 side-scrolling game for the Super NES and Genesis. It takes place around the time of the series premiere, borrowing some stories from early episodes such as "Past Prologue" and creating others. A number of problems reportedly impeded the game's development process, and it was met with mixed reactions.

Three DS9-themed games were released for the PC: Harbinger in 1996, The Fallen in 2000, and Dominion Wars in 2001. A board game was released as part of the now-defunct "component board game" series, which includes a compatible board game for Star Trek: The Next Generation. DS9's role-playing book is one of several that failed to be released into wide circulation when Decipher, then publisher of the Star Trek role-playing game, discontinued its line.

DS9 is featured prominently in the Star Trek Customizable Card Game, particularly its second edition. In the first edition, Deep Space Nine is the titular fifth set, followed by one titled The Dominion and several other DS9-themed sets. In the second edition, two types of cards are used for the United Federation of Planets, which may be placed at Earth or Deep Space Nine. The Ferengi, Dominion, Cardassian, Bajoran, and Maquis affiliations are primarily DS9-derived material, while the Klingon affiliation also borrows strongly from it.

The PC game Star Trek Online features Deep Space Nine as a trading hub. The lower ring (the Promenade) contains vendors, and the upper ring offers views of surrounding space. The expansion Victory is Life is focused around DS9 and the Gamma Quadrant.

In 2019, the Star Trek: Deep Space Nine – Red Alert video-game gambling machine was announced, with a tie-in promotion to the Las Vegas Star Trek convention.

== Other merchandising ==
Along with the rest of the Star Trek franchise, DS9 has had much merchandising including Action figures, keychains, and models. The station itself is the subject of many of these items. Paramount sells Starfleet uniforms, including the so-called "DS9-style" uniform with various division colors. The licensed product produced by Playmates Toys was directed by Karl Aaronian, who was responsible for helming the development of the Teenage Mutant Ninja Turtles. Aaronian called upon sculptors such as Scott Hensey of Anaglyph Studios, Steve Varner of Varner Studios, Art Asylum, and relied on graphic design from a number of design and development studios, including White Design, PANGEA, McHale Design, and Robinson-Clarke. The writing for the toy line was penned by John Schulte, John Besmehn, and Cheryl Ann Wong — all of PANGEA. The company was also responsible for generating blueprints of vessels and other in-pack incentives for the toy line.

DS9 was represented at Star Trek: The Experience, an attraction at the Las Vegas Hilton with an immersive reenactment of the DS9 universe, as an adventure on the bridge of the Enterprise and on DS9. Staffed by costumed actors, Quark's Bar and Restaurant served Star Trek-style cuisine, and hosted gatherings such as conventions. The Shopping Promenade sold souvenirs such as "official" Starfleet uniforms and action figures. The attraction closed in September 2008.
