= The Sound of Her Voice =

- Star Trek: Deep Space Nine episode
- Episode no.: Season 6 Episode 25
- Directed by: Winrich Kolbe
- Story by: Pam Pietroforte
- Teleplay by: Ronald D. Moore
- Cinematography by: Jonathan West
- Production code: 549
- Original air date: June 8, 1998

Guest appearances
- Debra Wilson as Lisa Cusak (voice); Penny Johnson as Kasidy Yates; Mark Allen Shepherd as Morn

Episode chronology
← Previous "Time's Orphan"	Next → "Tears of the Prophets"
- Star Trek: Deep Space Nine season 6

"The Sound of Her Voice" is the 149th episode of the syndicated American science fiction television series Star Trek: Deep Space Nine, the 25th episode of the sixth season. It was first broadcast the week of June 8, 1998.

Set in the 24th century, the series follows the adventures on the Starfleet-run space station Deep Space Nine. In this episode, the Deep Space Nine crew, aboard the Defiant, answers a call for help from a stranded Starfleet officer; meanwhile, back at the station, the bartender Quark attempts to distract security chief Odo so that he can conduct a smuggling operation. Debra Wilson guest stars as Lisa Cusak.

The episode's premiere received Nielsen ratings of 4.1 points, corresponding to about 4.05 million viewers.

== Plot ==
The crew of the Defiant receive a distress call from Captain Lisa Cusak, a Starfleet officer stranded on an alien world by herself, after her ship, the Olympia, has been destroyed. After establishing communication with her, they discover that the planet she is stranded on has a high concentration of carbon dioxide in the atmosphere, which will eventually kill her without regular doses of "triox" medication, and her supplies of it are running low. Dr. Bashir tells her to cut her dose so that she will survive the six days that it will take the Defiant to reach the planet. Captain Cusak asks that they keep a constant conversation going with her to keep her alert and to make her feel less isolated.

As they converse with her, the Defiant crew becomes closer to Captain Cusak. Captain Sisko confides in her that he is uncomfortable having his girlfriend Kasidy Yates aboard the Defiant; Cusak advises him against mixing his professional and personal life. She helps Bashir and chief engineer Miles O'Brien realize they have been letting the stress of their work and the ongoing war isolate them from their friends.

When Cusak's supply of triox runs low, Sisko orders power diverted from weapons to allow the Defiant to travel at a higher speed. They arrive at the planet shortly after Cusak has fallen unconscious, giving them a limited amount of time to find her. After figuring out how to get their shuttlecraft past a strange energy field that surrounds the planet, the crew finds that Cusak has been dead for roughly three years. O'Brien theorizes that the energy field caused their communications to travel through time. Sisko orders them to collect Cusak's body and gives her a proper burial back on Deep Space Nine as a Starfleet officer and trusted friend.

Meanwhile, Quark talks Odo into planning a date with Major Kira for their one-month anniversary. He tells budding writer Jake Sisko, who is writing a story about criminals, that while Odo is occupied he will sell rare crystals for profit. However, Odo decides to move his romantic evening to the following night, ruining Quark's plan. Taking pity on him, Odo decides to let him off this one time and has his evening with Kira when he originally planned.

== Production ==
This episode introduced the Chaffee shuttlecraft for the Defiant, designed by Doug Drexler. It is named after the real Apollo astronaut Roger Chaffee. In the book Ships of the Line by Doug Drexler and Margret Clark, they state that naming it after Chaffee is a reminder about the dangers of space exploration.

== Reception ==
In 2018, Vulture rated "The Sound of Her Voice" the eighth best episode of Star Trek: Deep Space Nine. They praised how actress Debra Wilson is able to establish the character of Lisa Cusak using only voice, and how the episode builds up a series of relationships using conversation.
