= Star Trek: Deep Space Nine Companion =

Star Trek Deep Space Nine Companion
- Author: Terry J. Erdmann and Paula M. Block
- Illustrator: Richard Oriolo
- Language: English
- Published: 2000 (Pocket Books)
- Media type: Paperback
- Pages: 725
- ISBN: 0-671-50106-2
- Dewey Decimal: 791.45/72
- LC Class: PN1992.77.S7315 E73 2000

The Star Trek: Deep Space Nine Companion (ISBN 978-0-671-50106-8) is a trade paperback released by Pocket Books in 2000. Written by Terry J. Erdmann and Paula M. Block, it takes a detailed look at Star Trek: Deep Space Nine, and features interviews with actors, writers, directors, producers, makeup artists, and other members of the production staff.

Erdmann had worked for ten years as the publicist in film, including on Star Trek V: The Final Frontier. In late 1993, Pocket Books editor Kevin Ryan asked Erdmann if he would be interested in writing books about the making of Star Trek. Erdmann agreed, and over seven years, conducted interviews with a wide range of people involved in the series. He wrote the book with his wife Paula M. Block.

The Companion takes a look at the creative processes behind each season and then has a detailed episode guide. Following each episode entry is the behind the scenes information. The book is 736 pages long, and features numerous black and white pictures.

An unrelated CD-ROM, also called the Star Trek: Deep Space Nine Companion (ISBN 978-0-671-31785-0), was released in 1999, and features the scripts for the entire series and the trailers for each episode featuring Don LaFontaine as the announcer, among others.

== Reception ==
Starlog magazine highly recommended the book, and called it a "must for any DS9 fan" and "one of the most authoritative companions to any TV program". The review by Stephen Cole in Dreamwatch criticized the book, opining that Erdmann did not present the content objectively, but through "rose-tinted lenses" and that because of this the book became difficult to read. He gave it a score of three out of five.

The Log Book.com wrote: "Criticism has been aired condemning the book as being overly pro-DS9. Well, to that I say, 'Duh'. It's not very often that a book is going to bash with impunity the series it's covering, or in the case of DS9, compare itself to the other Treks. To be honest, I disagree with this ascertainment of overt bias. In many of the behind-the-scenes sections, the producers openly admit that certain episodes were of less than stellar quality, without offering up pathetic excuses or 'could've beens' (at least very often). Naturally, there are certain episodes that the producers defend ('His Way' being a good example) that fans decried. But by and large Ron Moore and Ira Behr know what worked and what didn't and are candid about the whole affair".
