= The Reckoning (Star Trek: Deep Space Nine) =

- Star Trek: Deep Space Nine episode
- Episode no.: Season 6 Episode 21
- Directed by: Jesus Salvador Trevino
- Story by: Harry Werksman; Gabrielle G. Stanton
- Teleplay by: David Weddle; Bradley Thompson
- Production code: 545
- Original air date: April 27, 1998

Guest appearances
- James Greene as Koral; Louise Fletcher as Kai Winn; Mark Allen Shepherd as Morn

Episode chronology
← Previous "His Way"	Next → "Valiant"
- Star Trek: Deep Space Nine season 6

"The Reckoning" is the 145th episode of the television series Star Trek: Deep Space Nine, the 21st episode of the sixth season.

Set in the 24th century, the series takes place on Deep Space Nine, a fictional space station near the planet Bajor, guarding a wormhole that leads to the other side of the galaxy. The wormhole is inhabited by the Prophets, powerful alien beings who are worshiped by the Bajorans as gods and have designated Benjamin Sisko, the human commander of Deep Space Nine, as their Emissary.

In this episode, an ancient tablet addressing the Emissary is discovered on Bajor, leading to a battle on Deep Space Nine between the Prophets and their evil counterparts, the Pah Wraiths. Louise Fletcher makes a guest appearance in her recurring role as Kai Winn, the conniving head of the Bajoran religious hierarchy.

It was first broadcast on April 27, 1998 on broadcast television. The episode received Nielsen ratings of 4.2 points when it premiered corresponding to about 4.1 million viewers.

== Plot ==
An archeological dig on Bajor reveals an ancient tablet in an ancient Bajoran language that addresses the Emissary. Sisko brings the tablet to Deep Space Nine for further study, raising the ire of Kai Winn, who protests not being consulted in advance, and resents Sisko's connection with the Prophets. Dax's analysis of the tablet reveals an upcoming event called the "Reckoning", possibly involving the destruction of the station, and during which Bajor will experience great suffering. Meanwhile, the wormhole begins to behave erratically, causing disturbances on both the station and the planet. Winn attributes this to Sisko's possession of the tablet and forces him to agree to return it to the planet in the morning. That night, however, Sisko becomes frustrated at the Prophets and smashes the tablet, which releases red and blue vapors that dissipate into the station. Kai Winn is furious, but Sisko states his belief that he is doing the Prophets' will.

The station begins to experience mysterious power fluctuations, and the crew soon discover that Major Kira has become possessed by the blue mist – a Prophet – which is exuding intense power. The Prophet reveals that it is waiting for a Pah Wraith to battle it in the Reckoning. Most of the senior staff strongly recommend flooding the Promenade with radiation that would force the being to leave Kira, but Sisko refuses to interfere with the Prophets, and Odo states that he believes Kira is a willing participant. Sisko evacuates the station, but Kai Winn stays behind to witness the conflict, as Bajoran prophecies indicate that the Prophet's victory in the battle will result in a golden age for Bajor.

The Pah Wraith appears, having taken over the body of Sisko's son Jake, and it and the Prophet begin to battle, creating a dangerous energy buildup. Sisko orders the last of the crew to evacuate, but refuses to leave his son behind, believing the Prophets will not allow him to be killed. With the Prophet appearing to have the advantage, but both adversaries showing wounds from the struggle, Winn executes the command to flood the Promenade with radiation, interrupting the conflict and forcing both beings to leave. After her recovery, Kira accuses Winn of intervening out of jealousy over Sisko's greater faith, and warns her she will have to answer for the consequences of her actions.

== Reception ==
It was first broadcast on April 27, 1998 on broadcast television. The episode received Nielsen ratings of 4.2 points when it premiered corresponding to about 4.1 million viewers.

In a 2014 review of this Star Trek: Deep Space Nine episode, Zack Handlen of The A.V. Club remarked: "This is absolutely ridiculous, but I’m not going to lie: I kind of loved it." Keith R. A. DeCandido of Tor.com gave the episode a rating of one out of ten, calling the episode "insultingly simplistic"; he especially complained of the episode's portrayal of the Prophets and Pah-wraiths as "good" and "evil", observing "we only know that one is good and one is evil because we're told it."
