= Honor Among Thieves (Star Trek: Deep Space Nine) =

- Star Trek: Deep Space Nine episode
- Episode no.: Season 6 Episode 15
- Directed by: Allan Eastman
- Story by: Philip Kim
- Teleplay by: René Echevarria
- Production code: 539
- Original air date: February 23, 1998

Guest appearances
- Michael Harney as Chadwick; Carlos Carrasco as Krole; John Chandler as Flith; Leland Crooke as Vorta Gelnon; Joseph Culp as Raimus; Nick Tate as Liam Bilby

Episode chronology
← Previous "One Little Ship"	Next → "Change of Heart"
- Star Trek: Deep Space Nine season 6

"Honor Among Thieves" is the 139th episode of the television series Star Trek: Deep Space Nine. It is the 15th episode of the sixth season.

Set in the 24th century, the series follows the adventures of the crew of the fictional space station Deep Space Nine, which lies adjacent to a wormhole connecting the Alpha and Gamma Quadrants of the galaxy. The later seasons of the series follow a war against the Dominion, a hostile empire from the Gamma Quadrant. In this episode, Miles O'Brien is tasked by Starfleet Intelligence to infiltrate the Orion Syndicate, a powerful organized crime ring. His goal is to find the identity of the person in Starfleet who is leaking information about their undercover operatives to the Syndicate.

The episode premiered to Nielsen ratings of 4.6, which is about 4.5 million viewers.

== Plot ==
O'Brien is sent to infiltrate the Orion Syndicate on an out-of-the-way planet called Farius Prime. Starfleet Intelligence has given him the cover of a "fix-it man" down on his luck, knowing that the Syndicate is recruiting people with such skills. He spends his days in a bar frequented by Bilby, a local Syndicate operator.

O'Brien creates an opportunity and makes the most of it: when one of Bilby's men, Krole, is attempting to hack into a computer belonging to a local restaurant, O'Brien sabotages the computer to damage Krole's expensive hacking equipment. Miles saves Krole from injury, introducing himself as "Connolly", and volunteers to fix the equipment. Later, O'Brien repairs three broken Klingon-made disruptor weapons for Bilby, thereby winning his trust.

Bilby "witnesses" for O'Brien before his boss, Raimus, taking responsibility should anything go wrong with "Connolly"'s involvement in the Syndicate. Raimus comes to a meeting accompanied by a Vorta, revealing that the Orion Syndicate is working with the Dominion. By now O'Brien has succeeded in learning the identity of a Starfleet officer secretly working for the Syndicate, fulfilling his original mission objective; but Chadwick, his Starfleet Intelligence contact, asks him to remain undercover to learn more about the Dominion's involvement.

The Vorta orders Bilby to use the Klingon disruptors to assassinate the local Klingon ambassador, an opponent of the alliance between the Klingons and the United Federation of Planets against the Dominion. By having the ambassador killed by Klingon disruptors, it will appear that his assassination was ordered by the Klingon chancellor Gowron. The Dominion believes that he will be branded a martyr, furthering his cause and therefore weakening the alliance from within.

O'Brien informs Chadwick of the assassination plot. Rather than arrest the men involved, Chadwick opts to alert the Klingons and let them capture and execute Bilby and his men. By this point O'Brien has gotten close to Bilby, and hates the idea of being responsible for the death of a man who trusted him. He decides to tell Bilby the truth. Broken by the news, Bilby has little option but to head straight into the trap, as there is no running from the Syndicate. He hopes that, if he dies before it becomes obvious that O'Brien is working for Starfleet, Raimus will spare his family. Before leaving, he asks O'Brien to take care of his pet cat Chester.

== Reception ==
Tor.com gave it 2 out of 10. In a mixed review for The A.V. Club, Zack Handlen noted the plot's similarities to the film Donnie Brasco.
