= Nicole de Boer =

Canadian actress (born 1970)

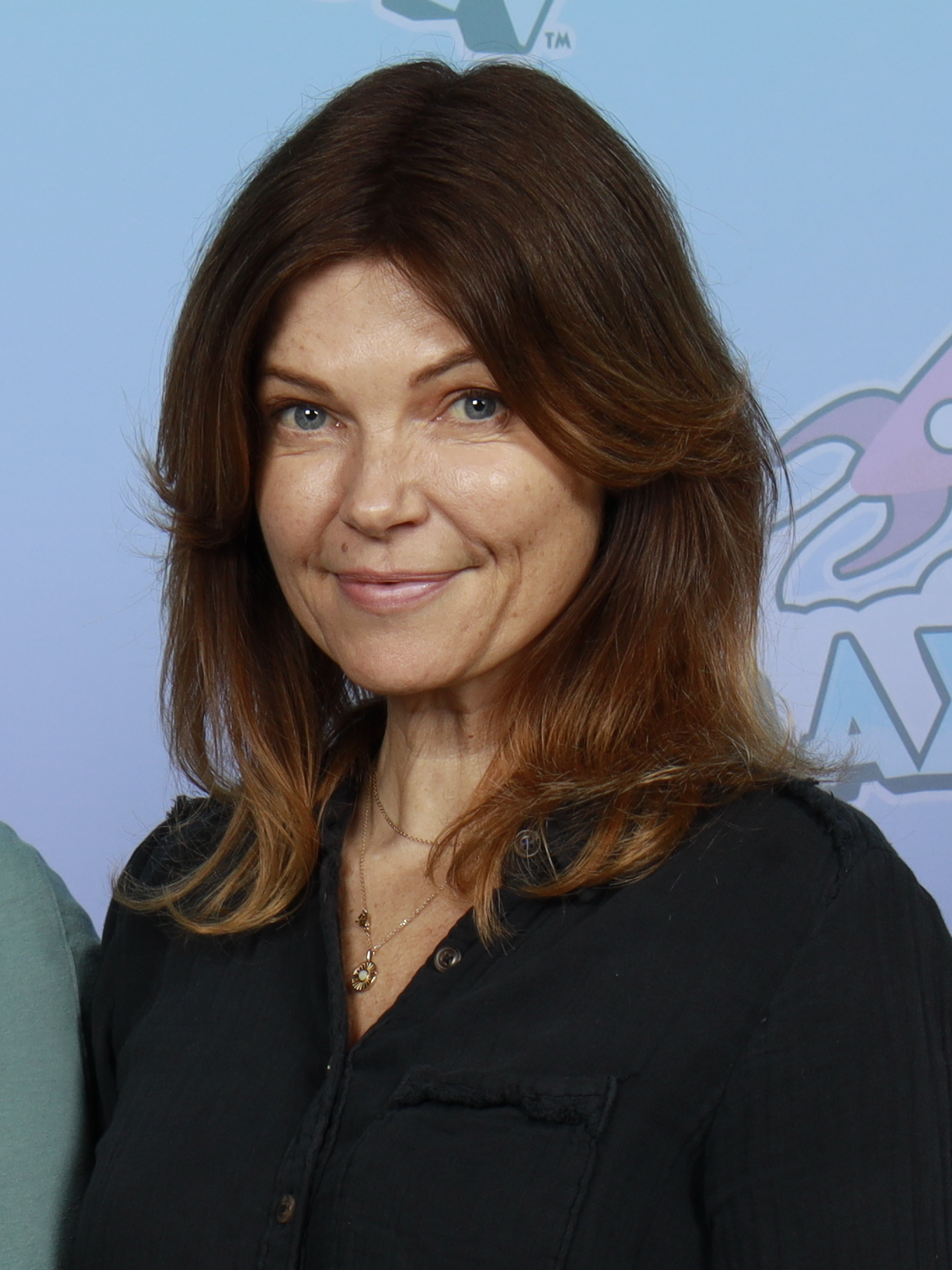
- De Boer at GalaxyCon San Jose in 2024
- Born: 20 December 1970 (age 55); Toronto, Ontario, Canada
- Other name: Nikki de Boer
- Occupation: Actress
- Years active: 1981–present
- Spouse: John Kastner (m. 1999; div. 2012)
- Children: 1

Nicole de Boer (born 20 December 1970) is a Canadian actress. She is best known for starring in the cult film Cube as Leaven, playing Ezri Dax on the final season of Star Trek: Deep Space Nine (1998–1999), and as Sarah Bannerman on the series The Dead Zone (2002–2007). From 2016 to 2021, she had a recurring role as Becca D' Orsay, ex-wife of one of the series leads on the Canadian-produced crime drama Private Eyes.

== Career ==
De Boer's television debut was an uncredited role in Freddy the Freeloader's Christmas Dinner, which starred Red Skelton and Vincent Price. Her first major television work was in the CBC series 9B, followed by a recurring role on the Canadian sketch comedy show The Kids in the Hall as Laura, girlfriend of Bobby Terrance (Bruce McCulloch). She later had a cameo in their 1996 film Kids in the Hall: Brain Candy.

She starred in the short-lived 1997 SyFy Channel series Deepwater Black (also known as Mission Genesis) as Yuna. This was followed by a role in the film, Cube (1997). She was featured in two episodes of the Canadian-produced series The Outer Limits.

De Boer's other roles have included Ezri Dax on Star Trek: Deep Space Nine's final season (1998–1999), and Sarah Bannerman on the series The Dead Zone (2002–2007).

She portrayed Dr. Alison Porter on the SyFy series Stargate Atlantis, appearing in the fifth-season episode "Whispers", and as Marion Caldwell on three episodes of the television series Haven.

== Filmography ==
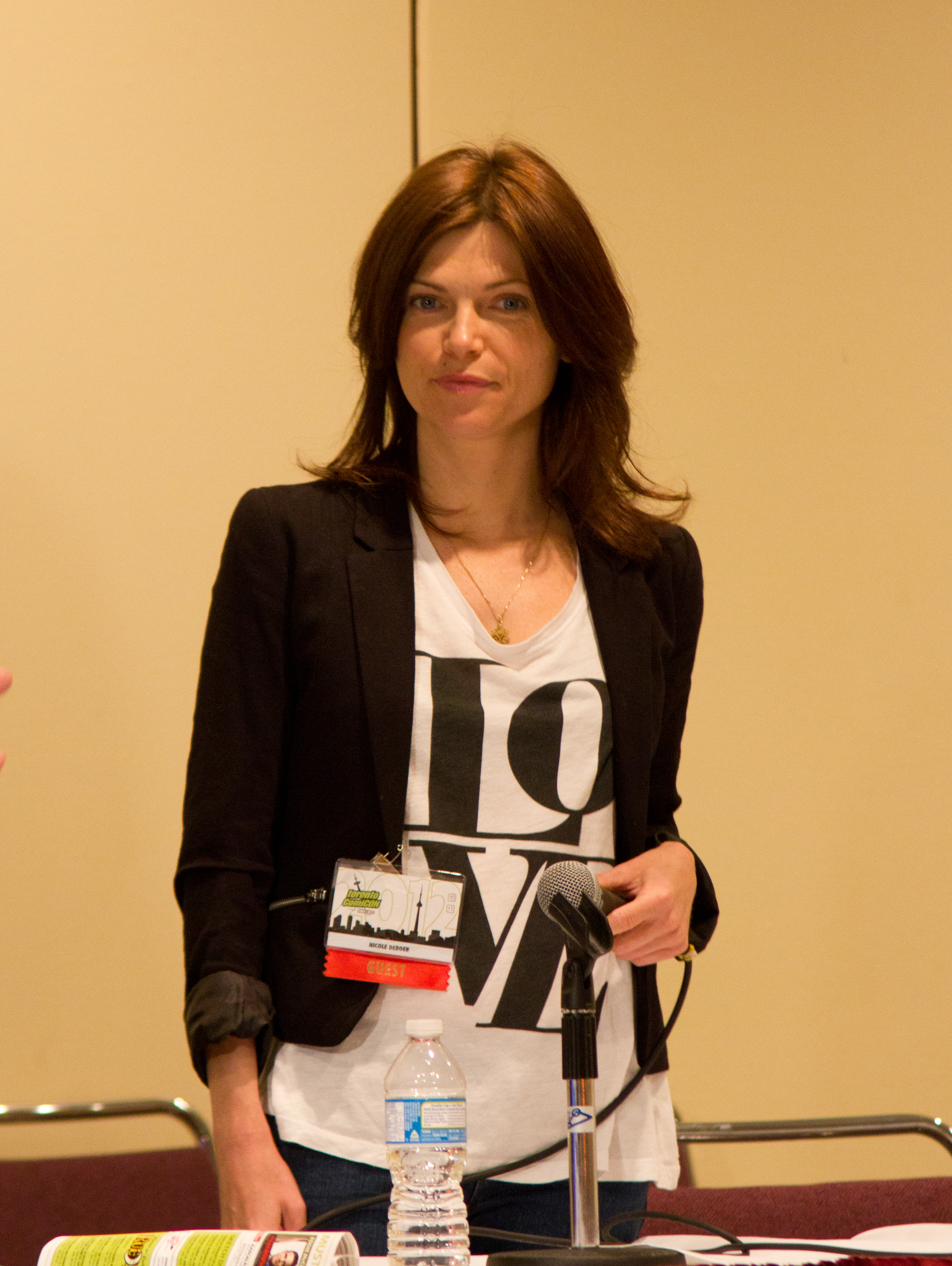
De Boer at Toronto Comic Con in 2012

=== Films ===
Year	Title	Role	Notes
1981	Freddie the Freeloader's Christmas Dinner	Little girl at hospital	
1990	The Kissing Place	Cathy	TV movie
1991	Prom Night IV: Deliver Us from Evil	Meagan	
1993	Family Pictures	Penny	TV movie
1994	The Counterfeit Contessa	Helena Everett	TV movie
1995	Jungleground	Caitlyn Dean	
1995	National Lampoon's Senior Trip	Meg Smith	
1996	Kids in the Hall: Brain Candy	Cooper's groupie	
1997	When Innocence Is Lost	Nancy	TV movie
1997	Cube	Leaven	
1999	Family of Cops 3: Under Suspicion	Jackie Fein	TV movie
2000	Rated X	Karen Mitchell	TV movie
2003	Public Domain	Bonnie	
2004	Phil the Alien	Madame Madame	
2006	Ties That Bind	Megan Mahoney	TV movie
2008	NYC: Tornado Terror	Cassie Lawrence	TV movie
2008	Christmas Town	Liz	Direct-to-video
2009	Suck	Susan	
2011	Iron Invader a/k/a Metal Shifters	Amanda	TV movie
2011	Metal Tornado	Rebecca	TV movie
2011	Secrets from Her Past	Hannah	TV movie
2012	My Mother's Secret	Lauren Coulson	TV movie
2016	Where's My Baby?	Marissa Davis	TV movie
2016	Corrupt a/k/a Trust No One	Kate MacIntyre	
2017	Stranger	Martha	Short
2021	Range Roads	Suzanne	

=== Television ===
Year	Title	Role	Notes
1981	Standing Room Only	Little girl at hospital	Episode: "Red Skelton's Christmas Dinner"
1988	9B	Erin Jones	5 episodes
1989	Street Legal	Jackie	Episode: "Home"
1989–1991	The Kids in the Hall	Laura	3 episodes
1991	Tropical Heat	Beth Goodnight	Episode: "Abandoned"
1991–1993	Beyond Reality	Celia Powell / Anna / Mrs. Winter	13 episodes
1992	Maniac Mansion	Holly	Episode: "Sophisticated Lady"
1992	Forever Knight	Jeannie	Episodes: "Dark Knight" & "Dark Knight: The Second Chapter"
1992–1994	E.N.G.	Nancy Bergman / Brenda	Episodes: "Baby It's You" & "The Play's the Thing"
1993	The Hidden Room	Paula	Episode: "The Faithful Follower"
1993	JFK: Reckless Youth	Olive Cawley	Mini-Series
1994	Catwalk	Maggie Holden	Entire second season
1995	TekWar	Tara James	Episode: "Chill Factor"
1995–1998	The Outer Limits	Cadet 2nd Class Bree Tristan / Rachel Sanders	Episodes: "Quality of Mercy" & "Monster"
1996	Poltergeist: The Legacy	Samantha Wallace	Episode: "The Crystal Scarab"
1996	Psi Factor	Kelly Starr Tanner	Episode: "Possession/Man Out of Time"
1997	Mission Genesis	Yuna	13 episodes
1997	Ready or Not	Crystal	Episode: "All or Nothing"
1998	The Wonderful World of Disney	Bonnie	Episode: "My Date with the President's Daughter"
1998–1999	Star Trek: Deep Space Nine	Lieutenant Ezri Dax	25 episodes
1999	Dooley Gardens	Skye	7 Episodes
2000	The Fearing Mind	Paula Kubiak	Episode: "Upgrade"
2002–2007	The Dead Zone	Sarah Bracknell Bannerman	72 episodes
2004	5ive Days to Midnight	Chantal Hume	Mini-series
2005–2009	Grandma Jane’s Garden Adventures	Cindy Simpson	Episode: "Butcher Shop"
2008	Stargate Atlantis	Dr. Alison Porter	Episode: "Whispers"
2010, 2013 and 2015	Haven	Marion Caldwell	Episodes: "Welcome to Haven", "Fallout", "Forever"
2012	Perception	Janice Zimmerman	Episode: "Shadow"
2013	Cracked	Leigh McMaster	Episode: "Swans"
2014	Reign	Lady Doisneau	Episode: "Coronation"
2016–2021	Private Eyes	Becca D'Orsay	16 episodes
2024	Matlock	Carlin	"Episode: Pilot"
