= Hans Beimler (screenwriter) =

American television writer and producer

- Born: July 10, 1953 (age 73); Mexico City, Mexico
- Education: University of Southern California
- Occupations: Television writer and producer
- Writing career
- Genre: Science fiction

Hans Anthony Beimler (born July 10, 1953) is a Mexican-born American television writer and producer, known for his work on Star Trek: Deep Space Nine. He has collaborated frequently with producer Richard Manning.

== Early life ==
Beimler was born in Mexico City, Mexico. His father, a German immigrant, was a commercial director and cameraman and his mother, an American, was an author and painter. He is the grandson of the historical political figure Hans Beimler. He attended the University of Southern California, graduating in 1977 with a degree in film production.

It was eight years before Beimler sold his first script, during which time he earned a living as a documentary cameraman – the same type of work that his father was involved in. He went on to become an assistant director for several televisions shows such as Eye to Eye, but also worked on feature films including The Falcon and the Snowman, Splash and Cocoon.

== Screenwriting ==
Beimler gained a position on the staff of television series Fame as a screenwriter, and went on to work for shows such as Knightwatch before gaining a staff position on Star Trek: The Next Generation.

Beimler wrote multiple episodes of, and worked as a story editor and co-producer for, The Next Generation from 1988 to 1990. During this period he frequently collaborated with Richard Manning. He was then co-executive producer, director, and writer for the short-lived series TekWar, before working on Star Trek: Deep Space Nine from 1995 to 1999. He had an uncredited appearance as a holodeck character in the series' final episode, "What You Leave Behind".

In 2005, Beimler and fellow former DS9 screenwriter Robert Hewitt Wolfe developed the pilot for a series called Scarlett. It was about an author living in New Orleans who believes that her characters are coming to life. The pilot was developed by Cheyenne Productions, owned by Bruce Willis.
