= List of minor planets: 666001–667000 =

The following is a partial list of minor planets, running from minor-planet number 666001 through 667000, inclusive. The primary data for this and other partial lists is based on JPL's "Small-Body Orbital Elements" and data available from the Minor Planet Center. Critical list information is also provided by the MPC, unless otherwise specified from Lowell Observatory. A detailed description of the table's columns and additional sources are given on the main page including a complete list of every page in this series, and a statistical break-up on the dynamical classification of minor planets.

Also see the summary list of all named bodies in numerical and alphabetical order, and the corresponding naming citations for the number range of this particular list. New namings may only be added to this list after official publication, as the preannouncement of names is condemned by the Working Group for Small Bodies Nomenclature of the International Astronomical Union.

Near-Earth obj.	MBA (inner)	MBA (outer)	Centaur
Mars-crosser	MBA (middle)	Jupiter trojan	Trans-Neptunian obj.
Unclassified

== 666001–666100 ==
Designation			Discovery			Properties		Ref
Permanent	Provisional	Named after	Date	Site	Discoverer(s)	Category	Diam.	Ref
666001	2009 WH_{30}	—	November 16, 2009	Kitt Peak	Spacewatch	VER	2.1 km	MPC · JPL
666002	2009 WJ_{30}	—	November 16, 2009	Kitt Peak	Spacewatch	·	620 m	MPC · JPL
666003	2009 WS_{30}	—	November 16, 2009	Kitt Peak	Spacewatch	·	840 m	MPC · JPL
666004	2009 WN_{34}	—	November 16, 2009	Kitt Peak	Spacewatch	·	690 m	MPC · JPL
666005	2009 WV_{35}	—	September 22, 2009	Kitt Peak	Spacewatch	VER	2.4 km	MPC · JPL
666006	2009 WX_{37}	—	August 25, 2008	Črni Vrh	Matičič, S.	EOS	2.2 km	MPC · JPL
666007	2009 WR_{42}	—	November 17, 2009	Mount Lemmon	Mount Lemmon Survey	·	1.1 km	MPC · JPL
666008	2009 WS_{45}	—	November 18, 2009	Kitt Peak	Spacewatch	·	1.5 km	MPC · JPL
666009	2009 WB_{47}	—	October 25, 2009	Mount Lemmon	Mount Lemmon Survey	·	750 m	MPC · JPL
666010	2009 WH_{48}	—	November 10, 2009	Mount Lemmon	Mount Lemmon Survey	·	3.0 km	MPC · JPL
666011	2009 WH_{50}	—	October 18, 2009	Catalina	CSS	·	1.6 km	MPC · JPL
666012	2009 WP_{52}	—	October 26, 2005	Kitt Peak	Spacewatch	·	960 m	MPC · JPL
666013	2009 WH_{58}	—	September 25, 1995	Kitt Peak	Spacewatch	·	1.5 km	MPC · JPL
666014	2009 WW_{58}	—	November 16, 2009	Mount Lemmon	Mount Lemmon Survey	L4	7.1 km	MPC · JPL
666015	2009 WW_{60}	—	July 30, 2008	Siding Spring	SSS	EOS	2.2 km	MPC · JPL
666016	2009 WE_{62}	—	November 16, 2009	Mount Lemmon	Mount Lemmon Survey	·	1.3 km	MPC · JPL
666017	2009 WD_{63}	—	November 16, 2009	Mount Lemmon	Mount Lemmon Survey	·	3.6 km	MPC · JPL
666018	2009 WO_{68}	—	April 22, 2007	Kitt Peak	Spacewatch	·	2.6 km	MPC · JPL
666019	2009 WK_{73}	—	November 9, 2009	Mount Lemmon	Mount Lemmon Survey	·	1.1 km	MPC · JPL
666020	2009 WJ_{75}	—	November 10, 2009	Kitt Peak	Spacewatch	·	940 m	MPC · JPL
666021	2009 WR_{75}	—	November 18, 2009	Kitt Peak	Spacewatch	·	1.5 km	MPC · JPL
666022	2009 WV_{77}	—	November 18, 2009	Kitt Peak	Spacewatch	·	1.5 km	MPC · JPL
666023	2009 WK_{79}	—	November 10, 2009	Kitt Peak	Spacewatch	·	540 m	MPC · JPL
666024	2009 WV_{80}	—	November 18, 2009	Kitt Peak	Spacewatch	·	1.6 km	MPC · JPL
666025	2009 WZ_{80}	—	January 9, 2006	Mount Lemmon	Mount Lemmon Survey	·	1.7 km	MPC · JPL
666026	2009 WJ_{82}	—	September 19, 2009	Mount Lemmon	Mount Lemmon Survey	TIN	800 m	MPC · JPL
666027	2009 WG_{90}	—	November 19, 2009	Kitt Peak	Spacewatch	·	3.1 km	MPC · JPL
666028	2009 WO_{90}	—	November 19, 2009	Kitt Peak	Spacewatch	·	1.7 km	MPC · JPL
666029	2009 WV_{95}	—	November 5, 2005	Kitt Peak	Spacewatch	(5)	890 m	MPC · JPL
666030	2009 WM_{96}	—	November 20, 2009	Mount Lemmon	Mount Lemmon Survey	·	2.9 km	MPC · JPL
666031	2009 WT_{98}	—	October 30, 2009	Mount Lemmon	Mount Lemmon Survey	·	700 m	MPC · JPL
666032	2009 WB_{99}	—	September 21, 2009	Mount Lemmon	Mount Lemmon Survey	·	3.2 km	MPC · JPL
666033	2009 WW_{99}	—	November 21, 2009	Mount Lemmon	Mount Lemmon Survey	EOS	1.6 km	MPC · JPL
666034	2009 WV_{100}	—	October 25, 2009	Kitt Peak	Spacewatch	·	2.4 km	MPC · JPL
666035	2009 WQ_{101}	—	November 8, 2009	Kitt Peak	Spacewatch	H	370 m	MPC · JPL
666036	2009 WA_{102}	—	November 9, 2009	Mount Lemmon	Mount Lemmon Survey	·	3.2 km	MPC · JPL
666037	2009 WZ_{102}	—	November 10, 2009	Kitt Peak	Spacewatch	·	660 m	MPC · JPL
666038	2009 WM_{104}	—	October 16, 2002	Palomar	NEAT	·	500 m	MPC · JPL
666039	2009 WH_{110}	—	April 19, 2006	Mount Lemmon	Mount Lemmon Survey	·	2.3 km	MPC · JPL
666040	2009 WU_{110}	—	November 17, 2009	Mount Lemmon	Mount Lemmon Survey	·	1.5 km	MPC · JPL
666041	2009 WF_{111}	—	January 31, 2006	Kitt Peak	Spacewatch	·	1.8 km	MPC · JPL
666042	2009 WK_{111}	—	October 12, 2009	Mount Lemmon	Mount Lemmon Survey	·	790 m	MPC · JPL
666043	2009 WL_{112}	—	January 30, 2006	Catalina	CSS	·	1.5 km	MPC · JPL
666044	2009 WB_{114}	—	September 19, 2009	Mount Lemmon	Mount Lemmon Survey	JUN	800 m	MPC · JPL
666045	2009 WD_{114}	—	September 12, 2005	Kitt Peak	Spacewatch	MAS	690 m	MPC · JPL
666046	2009 WA_{115}	—	September 22, 2009	Mount Lemmon	Mount Lemmon Survey	·	1.3 km	MPC · JPL
666047	2009 WY_{116}	—	November 20, 2009	Kitt Peak	Spacewatch	RAF	730 m	MPC · JPL
666048	2009 WG_{118}	—	November 20, 2009	Kitt Peak	Spacewatch	·	1.5 km	MPC · JPL
666049	2009 WB_{119}	—	October 27, 2009	Kitt Peak	Spacewatch	(5)	810 m	MPC · JPL
666050	2009 WF_{119}	—	September 19, 2003	Kitt Peak	Spacewatch	·	2.1 km	MPC · JPL
666051	2009 WC_{120}	—	November 10, 2009	Kitt Peak	Spacewatch	·	1.3 km	MPC · JPL
666052	2009 WC_{121}	—	November 20, 2009	Kitt Peak	Spacewatch	·	2.2 km	MPC · JPL
666053	2009 WT_{122}	—	November 16, 2009	Kitt Peak	Spacewatch	V	550 m	MPC · JPL
666054	2009 WZ_{122}	—	October 21, 2009	Mount Lemmon	Mount Lemmon Survey	VER	3.2 km	MPC · JPL
666055	2009 WN_{123}	—	November 8, 2009	Kitt Peak	Spacewatch	·	620 m	MPC · JPL
666056	2009 WW_{124}	—	November 8, 2009	Mount Lemmon	Mount Lemmon Survey	·	570 m	MPC · JPL
666057	2009 WE_{129}	—	November 20, 2009	Mount Lemmon	Mount Lemmon Survey	·	1.7 km	MPC · JPL
666058	2009 WZ_{130}	—	November 20, 2009	Kitt Peak	Spacewatch	·	3.2 km	MPC · JPL
666059	2009 WK_{133}	—	March 31, 2003	Kitt Peak	Spacewatch	·	1.4 km	MPC · JPL
666060	2009 WB_{134}	—	October 16, 2009	Mount Lemmon	Mount Lemmon Survey	·	540 m	MPC · JPL
666061	2009 WD_{135}	—	November 9, 2009	Mount Lemmon	Mount Lemmon Survey	·	2.5 km	MPC · JPL
666062	2009 WE_{135}	—	November 22, 2009	Mount Lemmon	Mount Lemmon Survey	·	2.5 km	MPC · JPL
666063	2009 WL_{135}	—	October 24, 2009	Kitt Peak	Spacewatch	·	3.1 km	MPC · JPL
666064	2009 WZ_{136}	—	October 23, 2009	Kitt Peak	Spacewatch	·	3.2 km	MPC · JPL
666065	2009 WL_{138}	—	November 23, 2009	Kitt Peak	Spacewatch	VER	2.9 km	MPC · JPL
666066	2009 WY_{139}	—	October 14, 2009	Mount Lemmon	Mount Lemmon Survey	·	3.0 km	MPC · JPL
666067	2009 WB_{143}	—	November 19, 2009	Mount Lemmon	Mount Lemmon Survey	HNS	910 m	MPC · JPL
666068	2009 WC_{144}	—	October 16, 2009	Catalina	CSS	·	2.9 km	MPC · JPL
666069	2009 WA_{145}	—	October 11, 2009	Mount Lemmon	Mount Lemmon Survey	·	1.6 km	MPC · JPL
666070	2009 WK_{145}	—	September 20, 2009	Mount Lemmon	Mount Lemmon Survey	·	3.2 km	MPC · JPL
666071	2009 WW_{146}	—	December 22, 2005	Kitt Peak	Spacewatch	·	1.4 km	MPC · JPL
666072	2009 WH_{150}	—	February 16, 2007	Mount Lemmon	Mount Lemmon Survey	·	1.0 km	MPC · JPL
666073	2009 WR_{152}	—	November 19, 2009	Mount Lemmon	Mount Lemmon Survey	EOS	2.0 km	MPC · JPL
666074	2009 WQ_{156}	—	November 10, 2009	Kitt Peak	Spacewatch	JUN	940 m	MPC · JPL
666075	2009 WX_{156}	—	November 20, 2009	Mount Lemmon	Mount Lemmon Survey	·	680 m	MPC · JPL
666076	2009 WO_{158}	—	November 20, 2009	Mount Lemmon	Mount Lemmon Survey	·	1.9 km	MPC · JPL
666077	2009 WM_{168}	—	November 9, 2009	Mount Lemmon	Mount Lemmon Survey	·	2.0 km	MPC · JPL
666078	2009 WK_{171}	—	August 29, 2008	Črni Vrh	Matičič, S.	·	4.5 km	MPC · JPL
666079	2009 WM_{173}	—	November 16, 2009	Mount Lemmon	Mount Lemmon Survey	·	4.1 km	MPC · JPL
666080	2009 WR_{173}	—	November 9, 2009	Mount Lemmon	Mount Lemmon Survey	·	1.4 km	MPC · JPL
666081	2009 WC_{174}	—	November 22, 2009	Kitt Peak	Spacewatch	·	3.5 km	MPC · JPL
666082	2009 WH_{175}	—	October 22, 2009	Mount Lemmon	Mount Lemmon Survey	H	460 m	MPC · JPL
666083	2009 WC_{181}	—	November 23, 2009	Kitt Peak	Spacewatch	·	1.6 km	MPC · JPL
666084	2009 WH_{182}	—	November 23, 2009	Kitt Peak	Spacewatch	(5)	1.1 km	MPC · JPL
666085	2009 WZ_{183}	—	September 20, 2003	Kitt Peak	Spacewatch	·	2.8 km	MPC · JPL
666086	2009 WL_{186}	—	November 9, 2009	Kitt Peak	Spacewatch	·	2.3 km	MPC · JPL
666087	2009 WP_{186}	—	September 21, 2003	Kitt Peak	Spacewatch	VER	2.5 km	MPC · JPL
666088	2009 WJ_{187}	—	March 20, 2007	Mount Lemmon	Mount Lemmon Survey	·	1.5 km	MPC · JPL
666089	2009 WW_{188}	—	September 18, 2009	Kitt Peak	Spacewatch	MRX	860 m	MPC · JPL
666090	2009 WA_{189}	—	November 16, 2009	Kitt Peak	Spacewatch	·	2.8 km	MPC · JPL
666091	2009 WX_{190}	—	November 16, 2009	Kitt Peak	Spacewatch	·	2.7 km	MPC · JPL
666092	2009 WP_{195}	—	October 16, 2003	Kitt Peak	Spacewatch	·	3.4 km	MPC · JPL
666093	2009 WQ_{195}	—	November 16, 2009	Kitt Peak	Spacewatch	·	3.1 km	MPC · JPL
666094	2009 WR_{196}	—	November 25, 2009	Mount Lemmon	Mount Lemmon Survey	·	2.9 km	MPC · JPL
666095	2009 WG_{199}	—	November 18, 2009	Mount Lemmon	Mount Lemmon Survey	·	3.1 km	MPC · JPL
666096	2009 WL_{202}	—	September 22, 2009	Mount Lemmon	Mount Lemmon Survey	·	1.5 km	MPC · JPL
666097	2009 WE_{204}	—	November 16, 2009	Kitt Peak	Spacewatch	·	3.2 km	MPC · JPL
666098	2009 WC_{208}	—	August 26, 2005	Palomar	NEAT	·	1.0 km	MPC · JPL
666099	2009 WW_{208}	—	October 26, 2009	Mount Lemmon	Mount Lemmon Survey	·	1.6 km	MPC · JPL
666100	2009 WP_{211}	—	November 10, 2009	Kitt Peak	Spacewatch	·	1.2 km	MPC · JPL

== 666101–666200 ==
back to top

Designation			Discovery			Properties		Ref
Permanent	Provisional	Named after	Date	Site	Discoverer(s)	Category	Diam.	Ref
666101	2009 WA_{217}	—	October 12, 2009	Mount Lemmon	Mount Lemmon Survey	·	370 m	MPC · JPL
666102	2009 WL_{221}	—	November 16, 2009	Mount Lemmon	Mount Lemmon Survey	·	580 m	MPC · JPL
666103	2009 WU_{222}	—	October 2, 2003	Kitt Peak	Spacewatch	·	2.6 km	MPC · JPL
666104	2009 WS_{223}	—	September 26, 2003	Apache Point	SDSS	·	3.6 km	MPC · JPL
666105	2009 WM_{224}	—	November 16, 2009	Kitt Peak	Spacewatch	·	2.9 km	MPC · JPL
666106	2009 WG_{225}	—	November 9, 2009	Kitt Peak	Spacewatch	·	770 m	MPC · JPL
666107	2009 WZ_{227}	—	March 15, 2007	Mount Lemmon	Mount Lemmon Survey	·	2.8 km	MPC · JPL
666108	2009 WP_{228}	—	November 17, 2009	Mount Lemmon	Mount Lemmon Survey	L4	7.9 km	MPC · JPL
666109	2009 WX_{228}	—	October 23, 2009	Mount Lemmon	Mount Lemmon Survey	·	1.3 km	MPC · JPL
666110	2009 WE_{229}	—	November 17, 2009	Mount Lemmon	Mount Lemmon Survey	·	2.7 km	MPC · JPL
666111	2009 WK_{229}	—	November 17, 2009	Mount Lemmon	Mount Lemmon Survey	·	610 m	MPC · JPL
666112	2009 WF_{230}	—	April 24, 2007	Kitt Peak	Spacewatch	·	2.9 km	MPC · JPL
666113	2009 WR_{230}	—	November 17, 2009	Kitt Peak	Spacewatch	·	2.8 km	MPC · JPL
666114	2009 WV_{231}	—	November 17, 2009	Mount Lemmon	Mount Lemmon Survey	L4	7.2 km	MPC · JPL
666115	2009 WN_{233}	—	November 10, 2009	Kitt Peak	Spacewatch	·	1.3 km	MPC · JPL
666116	2009 WL_{235}	—	November 20, 2009	Mount Lemmon	Mount Lemmon Survey	·	1.1 km	MPC · JPL
666117	2009 WS_{235}	—	January 25, 2007	Kitt Peak	Spacewatch	·	1.0 km	MPC · JPL
666118	2009 WH_{242}	—	November 19, 2009	Kitt Peak	Spacewatch	·	1.5 km	MPC · JPL
666119	2009 WV_{243}	—	November 19, 2009	Mount Lemmon	Mount Lemmon Survey	·	1.5 km	MPC · JPL
666120	2009 WB_{244}	—	November 19, 2009	Kitt Peak	Spacewatch	·	590 m	MPC · JPL
666121	2009 WC_{244}	—	November 19, 2009	Mount Lemmon	Mount Lemmon Survey	·	1.5 km	MPC · JPL
666122	2009 WM_{244}	—	November 19, 2009	Kitt Peak	Spacewatch	·	590 m	MPC · JPL
666123	2009 WY_{244}	—	November 20, 2009	Mount Lemmon	Mount Lemmon Survey	·	2.7 km	MPC · JPL
666124	2009 WW_{248}	—	November 17, 2009	Catalina	CSS	·	1.1 km	MPC · JPL
666125	2009 WB_{249}	—	November 18, 2009	Mount Lemmon	Mount Lemmon Survey	H	430 m	MPC · JPL
666126	2009 WB_{250}	—	November 26, 2009	Mount Lemmon	Mount Lemmon Survey	·	1.2 km	MPC · JPL
666127	2009 WX_{250}	—	November 26, 2009	Mount Lemmon	Mount Lemmon Survey	·	2.9 km	MPC · JPL
666128	2009 WK_{251}	—	September 30, 2009	Mount Lemmon	Mount Lemmon Survey	·	1.3 km	MPC · JPL
666129	2009 WA_{252}	—	September 19, 2003	Kitt Peak	Spacewatch	EMA	3.0 km	MPC · JPL
666130	2009 WZ_{253}	—	November 17, 2009	Kitt Peak	Spacewatch	·	1.0 km	MPC · JPL
666131	2009 WD_{256}	—	September 20, 2009	Mount Lemmon	Mount Lemmon Survey	·	1.8 km	MPC · JPL
666132	2009 WH_{257}	—	November 25, 2009	Kitt Peak	Spacewatch	·	1.2 km	MPC · JPL
666133	2009 WB_{265}	—	November 17, 2009	Mount Lemmon	Mount Lemmon Survey	EOS	1.5 km	MPC · JPL
666134	2009 WA_{271}	—	November 21, 2009	Mount Lemmon	Mount Lemmon Survey	·	1.3 km	MPC · JPL
666135	2009 WD_{271}	—	June 7, 2016	Haleakala	Pan-STARRS 1	·	1.5 km	MPC · JPL
666136	2009 WJ_{271}	—	March 4, 2016	Haleakala	Pan-STARRS 1	·	1.3 km	MPC · JPL
666137	2009 WC_{272}	—	November 20, 2009	Mount Lemmon	Mount Lemmon Survey	·	1.1 km	MPC · JPL
666138	2009 WG_{272}	—	January 22, 2015	Haleakala	Pan-STARRS 1	(5)	1.1 km	MPC · JPL
666139	2009 WO_{272}	—	November 24, 2009	Kitt Peak	Spacewatch	·	2.9 km	MPC · JPL
666140	2009 WS_{273}	—	November 19, 2009	Kitt Peak	Spacewatch	·	770 m	MPC · JPL
666141	2009 WJ_{274}	—	January 31, 2006	Catalina	CSS	(5)	780 m	MPC · JPL
666142	2009 WL_{274}	—	November 26, 2009	Kitt Peak	Spacewatch	·	570 m	MPC · JPL
666143	2009 WV_{274}	—	January 25, 2011	Mount Lemmon	Mount Lemmon Survey	·	2.0 km	MPC · JPL
666144	2009 WM_{275}	—	March 10, 2011	Kitt Peak	Spacewatch	·	840 m	MPC · JPL
666145	2009 WO_{276}	—	January 30, 2011	Mount Lemmon	Mount Lemmon Survey	HYG	2.3 km	MPC · JPL
666146	2009 WZ_{276}	—	May 3, 2011	Mount Lemmon	Mount Lemmon Survey	·	660 m	MPC · JPL
666147	2009 WV_{278}	—	November 24, 2009	Kitt Peak	Spacewatch	·	580 m	MPC · JPL
666148	2009 WF_{279}	—	November 2, 2013	Mount Lemmon	Mount Lemmon Survey	·	1.6 km	MPC · JPL
666149	2009 WV_{279}	—	October 14, 2009	XuYi	PMO NEO Survey Program	·	650 m	MPC · JPL
666150	2009 WH_{280}	—	September 24, 2017	Haleakala	Pan-STARRS 1	·	1.0 km	MPC · JPL
666151	2009 WX_{280}	—	December 27, 2016	Mount Lemmon	Mount Lemmon Survey	·	720 m	MPC · JPL
666152	2009 WV_{281}	—	November 24, 2009	Mount Lemmon	Mount Lemmon Survey	·	1.2 km	MPC · JPL
666153	2009 WX_{281}	—	November 20, 2009	Kitt Peak	Spacewatch	·	760 m	MPC · JPL
666154	2009 WD_{282}	—	June 2, 2018	Mount Lemmon	Mount Lemmon Survey	·	540 m	MPC · JPL
666155	2009 WL_{283}	—	April 27, 2012	Haleakala	Pan-STARRS 1	·	1.5 km	MPC · JPL
666156	2009 WW_{283}	—	October 17, 2014	Mount Lemmon	Mount Lemmon Survey	·	2.1 km	MPC · JPL
666157	2009 WW_{284}	—	October 23, 2013	Mount Lemmon	Mount Lemmon Survey	·	1.0 km	MPC · JPL
666158	2009 WX_{286}	—	November 6, 2010	Kitt Peak	Spacewatch	L4	6.0 km	MPC · JPL
666159	2009 WG_{288}	—	November 20, 2009	Kitt Peak	Spacewatch	·	1.1 km	MPC · JPL
666160	2009 WV_{288}	—	November 19, 2009	Mount Lemmon	Mount Lemmon Survey	(18466)	2.0 km	MPC · JPL
666161	2009 WD_{289}	—	November 21, 2009	Kitt Peak	Spacewatch	·	1.4 km	MPC · JPL
666162	2009 WF_{291}	—	November 26, 2009	Mount Lemmon	Mount Lemmon Survey	·	1.3 km	MPC · JPL
666163	2009 WM_{291}	—	November 23, 2009	Mount Lemmon	Mount Lemmon Survey	L4	6.7 km	MPC · JPL
666164	2009 WW_{300}	—	November 26, 2009	Kitt Peak	Spacewatch	WIT	710 m	MPC · JPL
666165	2009 XS_{3}	—	November 19, 2009	Kitt Peak	Spacewatch	PHO	760 m	MPC · JPL
666166	2009 XG_{7}	—	December 10, 2009	Socorro	LINEAR	·	2.3 km	MPC · JPL
666167	2009 XS_{8}	—	October 30, 2009	Mount Lemmon	Mount Lemmon Survey	MAS	700 m	MPC · JPL
666168	2009 XM_{13}	—	September 21, 2009	Catalina	CSS	H	530 m	MPC · JPL
666169	2009 XD_{20}	—	January 30, 2006	Catalina	CSS	·	1.7 km	MPC · JPL
666170	2009 XS_{27}	—	August 3, 2015	Haleakala	Pan-STARRS 1	·	680 m	MPC · JPL
666171	2009 XY_{27}	—	March 28, 2014	Mount Lemmon	Mount Lemmon Survey	·	650 m	MPC · JPL
666172	2009 XA_{28}	—	September 14, 2013	Haleakala	Pan-STARRS 1	·	1.3 km	MPC · JPL
666173	2009 XE_{30}	—	December 10, 2009	Mount Lemmon	Mount Lemmon Survey	·	1.8 km	MPC · JPL
666174	2009 YH	—	November 10, 2009	Kitt Peak	Spacewatch	TIR	2.9 km	MPC · JPL
666175	2009 YJ	—	October 30, 2009	Mount Lemmon	Mount Lemmon Survey	·	1.9 km	MPC · JPL
666176	2009 YW_{4}	—	December 17, 2009	Mount Lemmon	Mount Lemmon Survey	EOS	2.2 km	MPC · JPL
666177	2009 YP_{8}	—	December 16, 2009	Mount Lemmon	Mount Lemmon Survey	·	3.7 km	MPC · JPL
666178	2009 YG_{9}	—	November 25, 2009	Kitt Peak	Spacewatch	EOS	1.8 km	MPC · JPL
666179	2009 YA_{13}	—	January 3, 1997	Kitt Peak	Spacewatch	·	1.5 km	MPC · JPL
666180	2009 YF_{14}	—	July 30, 2008	Mount Lemmon	Mount Lemmon Survey	·	1.6 km	MPC · JPL
666181	2009 YR_{15}	—	December 19, 2009	Mount Lemmon	Mount Lemmon Survey	V	540 m	MPC · JPL
666182	2009 YG_{19}	—	October 21, 1995	Kitt Peak	Spacewatch	res · 2:5	214 km	MPC · JPL
666183	2009 YF_{24}	—	December 17, 2009	Kitt Peak	Spacewatch	·	3.1 km	MPC · JPL
666184	2009 YS_{26}	—	December 17, 2009	Haleakala	Pan-STARRS 1	other TNO	176 km	MPC · JPL
666185	2009 YT_{26}	—	December 26, 2009	Haleakala	Pan-STARRS 1	plutino	255 km	MPC · JPL
666186	2009 YA_{27}	—	December 20, 2009	Mount Lemmon	Mount Lemmon Survey	·	810 m	MPC · JPL
666187	2009 YB_{27}	—	April 28, 2012	Mount Lemmon	Mount Lemmon Survey	·	2.5 km	MPC · JPL
666188	2009 YD_{27}	—	October 25, 2013	Kitt Peak	Spacewatch	(5)	810 m	MPC · JPL
666189	2009 YM_{27}	—	May 31, 2011	Mount Lemmon	Mount Lemmon Survey	·	710 m	MPC · JPL
666190	2009 YP_{27}	—	December 17, 2009	Mount Lemmon	Mount Lemmon Survey	GEF	1.1 km	MPC · JPL
666191	2009 YG_{28}	—	December 17, 2009	Mount Lemmon	Mount Lemmon Survey	H	470 m	MPC · JPL
666192	2009 YH_{28}	—	July 22, 2011	Haleakala	Pan-STARRS 1	H	500 m	MPC · JPL
666193	2009 YS_{28}	—	March 13, 2011	Mount Lemmon	Mount Lemmon Survey	EOS	1.8 km	MPC · JPL
666194	2009 YW_{28}	—	September 26, 2017	Haleakala	Pan-STARRS 1	H	420 m	MPC · JPL
666195	2009 YB_{29}	—	September 27, 2013	Haleakala	Pan-STARRS 1	·	1.6 km	MPC · JPL
666196	2009 YH_{29}	—	December 18, 2009	Mount Lemmon	Mount Lemmon Survey	·	1.4 km	MPC · JPL
666197	2009 YS_{29}	—	December 17, 2009	Kitt Peak	Spacewatch	·	1.9 km	MPC · JPL
666198	2009 YH_{30}	—	December 16, 2009	Mount Lemmon	Mount Lemmon Survey	H	380 m	MPC · JPL
666199	2009 YP_{30}	—	December 20, 2009	Kitt Peak	Spacewatch	(5)	820 m	MPC · JPL
666200	2009 YD_{32}	—	December 18, 2009	Kitt Peak	Spacewatch	·	1.6 km	MPC · JPL

== 666201–666300 ==
back to top

Designation			Discovery			Properties		Ref
Permanent	Provisional	Named after	Date	Site	Discoverer(s)	Category	Diam.	Ref
666201	2009 YK_{32}	—	December 25, 2009	Haleakala	Pan-STARRS 1	cubewano (cold) · moon	208 km	MPC · JPL
666202	2009 YY_{32}	—	December 18, 2009	Mount Lemmon	Mount Lemmon Survey	3:2	4.4 km	MPC · JPL
666203	2009 YD_{33}	—	December 18, 2009	Mount Lemmon	Mount Lemmon Survey	H	480 m	MPC · JPL
666204	2010 AC	—	January 5, 2010	Kitt Peak	Spacewatch	·	1.7 km	MPC · JPL
666205	2010 AH_{7}	—	January 6, 2010	Kitt Peak	Spacewatch	GEF	890 m	MPC · JPL
666206	2010 AE_{11}	—	January 6, 2010	Mount Lemmon	Mount Lemmon Survey	·	1.5 km	MPC · JPL
666207	2010 AF_{12}	—	January 6, 2010	Kitt Peak	Spacewatch	·	3.2 km	MPC · JPL
666208	2010 AP_{21}	—	January 6, 2010	Kitt Peak	Spacewatch	·	1.9 km	MPC · JPL
666209	2010 AE_{25}	—	September 23, 2008	Mount Lemmon	Mount Lemmon Survey	(11882)	2.0 km	MPC · JPL
666210	2010 AN_{27}	—	December 18, 2009	Mount Lemmon	Mount Lemmon Survey	·	630 m	MPC · JPL
666211	2010 AB_{28}	—	January 7, 2010	Mount Lemmon	Mount Lemmon Survey	AGN	950 m	MPC · JPL
666212	2010 AE_{34}	—	January 30, 2006	Uccle	P. De Cat	·	1.3 km	MPC · JPL
666213	2010 AB_{36}	—	December 15, 2009	Mount Lemmon	Mount Lemmon Survey	·	620 m	MPC · JPL
666214	2010 AX_{39}	—	November 20, 2009	Mount Lemmon	Mount Lemmon Survey	·	840 m	MPC · JPL
666215	2010 AY_{48}	—	November 27, 2009	Mount Lemmon	Mount Lemmon Survey	·	1.4 km	MPC · JPL
666216	2010 AR_{51}	—	April 14, 2002	Kitt Peak	Spacewatch	·	1.9 km	MPC · JPL
666217	2010 AG_{52}	—	December 27, 2009	Kitt Peak	Spacewatch	·	1.1 km	MPC · JPL
666218	2010 AS_{54}	—	January 8, 2010	Kitt Peak	Spacewatch	GEF	1.0 km	MPC · JPL
666219	2010 AP_{56}	—	January 10, 2010	Mount Lemmon	Mount Lemmon Survey	·	1.5 km	MPC · JPL
666220	2010 AO_{60}	—	January 15, 2010	Catalina	CSS	ATE	160 m	MPC · JPL
666221	2010 AH_{70}	—	January 12, 2010	Catalina	CSS	(5)	1.0 km	MPC · JPL
666222	2010 AA_{71}	—	January 12, 2010	Mount Lemmon	Mount Lemmon Survey	H	500 m	MPC · JPL
666223	2010 AO_{76}	—	January 12, 2010	Catalina	CSS	·	1.8 km	MPC · JPL
666224	2010 AN_{78}	—	December 20, 2009	Kitt Peak	Spacewatch	·	2.1 km	MPC · JPL
666225	2010 AG_{143}	—	May 30, 2006	Mount Lemmon	Mount Lemmon Survey	·	3.8 km	MPC · JPL
666226	2010 AV_{153}	—	January 6, 2010	Haleakala	Pan-STARRS 1	plutino	172 km	MPC · JPL
666227	2010 AJ_{154}	—	November 1, 2013	Catalina	CSS	·	1.5 km	MPC · JPL
666228	2010 AK_{154}	—	September 29, 2013	Catalina	CSS	·	2.0 km	MPC · JPL
666229	2010 AS_{154}	—	September 24, 2017	Mount Lemmon	Mount Lemmon Survey	·	1.2 km	MPC · JPL
666230	2010 AK_{155}	—	October 7, 2013	Catalina	CSS	·	1.4 km	MPC · JPL
666231	2010 AR_{155}	—	November 7, 2012	Kitt Peak	Spacewatch	·	620 m	MPC · JPL
666232	2010 AC_{156}	—	November 16, 1995	Kitt Peak	Spacewatch	·	490 m	MPC · JPL
666233	2010 AQ_{156}	—	September 9, 2015	Haleakala	Pan-STARRS 1	·	760 m	MPC · JPL
666234	2010 AQ_{157}	—	October 11, 2012	Kitt Peak	Spacewatch	·	600 m	MPC · JPL
666235	2010 AL_{158}	—	January 26, 2015	Haleakala	Pan-STARRS 1	·	1.7 km	MPC · JPL
666236	2010 AV_{158}	—	October 11, 2017	Mount Lemmon	Mount Lemmon Survey	·	1.4 km	MPC · JPL
666237	2010 AQ_{159}	—	January 20, 2017	Haleakala	Pan-STARRS 1	·	530 m	MPC · JPL
666238	2010 AF_{160}	—	February 28, 2014	Haleakala	Pan-STARRS 1	·	660 m	MPC · JPL
666239	2010 AO_{160}	—	January 6, 2010	Kitt Peak	Spacewatch	·	1.6 km	MPC · JPL
666240	2010 AF_{161}	—	January 16, 2015	Haleakala	Pan-STARRS 1	·	1.5 km	MPC · JPL
666241	2010 BK_{2}	—	January 19, 2010	Siding Spring	SSS	ATE	120 m	MPC · JPL
666242	2010 BU_{153}	—	February 17, 2010	Mount Lemmon	Mount Lemmon Survey	·	1.2 km	MPC · JPL
666243	2010 CB_{3}	—	February 5, 2010	Kitt Peak	Spacewatch	·	660 m	MPC · JPL
666244	2010 CL_{3}	—	February 5, 2010	Kitt Peak	Spacewatch	·	1.6 km	MPC · JPL
666245	2010 CT_{18}	—	February 13, 2010	LightBuckets	T. Vorobjov	·	1.9 km	MPC · JPL
666246	2010 CM_{21}	—	March 16, 2007	Kitt Peak	Spacewatch	·	660 m	MPC · JPL
666247	2010 CT_{22}	—	February 9, 2010	Kitt Peak	Spacewatch	H	510 m	MPC · JPL
666248	2010 CX_{23}	—	January 6, 2010	Kitt Peak	Spacewatch	·	1.2 km	MPC · JPL
666249	2010 CW_{24}	—	January 7, 2010	Kitt Peak	Spacewatch	·	1.2 km	MPC · JPL
666250	2010 CV_{27}	—	January 8, 2010	Kitt Peak	Spacewatch	·	1.3 km	MPC · JPL
666251	2010 CE_{29}	—	June 27, 2006	Siding Spring	SSS	·	1.8 km	MPC · JPL
666252	2010 CU_{29}	—	January 5, 2010	Kitt Peak	Spacewatch	·	510 m	MPC · JPL
666253	2010 CL_{30}	—	February 9, 2010	Mount Lemmon	Mount Lemmon Survey	·	1.7 km	MPC · JPL
666254	2010 CR_{30}	—	February 9, 2010	Mount Lemmon	Mount Lemmon Survey	·	1.6 km	MPC · JPL
666255	2010 CM_{35}	—	December 2, 2005	Kitt Peak	Wasserman, L. H., Millis, R. L.	·	1.2 km	MPC · JPL
666256	2010 CF_{37}	—	August 22, 2004	Kitt Peak	Spacewatch	·	940 m	MPC · JPL
666257	2010 CS_{38}	—	December 4, 2005	Mount Lemmon	Mount Lemmon Survey	MAS	830 m	MPC · JPL
666258	2010 CS_{39}	—	July 24, 2003	Palomar	NEAT	·	1.8 km	MPC · JPL
666259	2010 CO_{59}	—	December 20, 2009	Mount Lemmon	Mount Lemmon Survey	·	2.6 km	MPC · JPL
666260	2010 CS_{60}	—	February 14, 2010	Catalina	CSS	·	1.5 km	MPC · JPL
666261	2010 CY_{60}	—	February 9, 2010	Mount Lemmon	Mount Lemmon Survey	·	470 m	MPC · JPL
666262	2010 CX_{72}	—	October 4, 2008	Catalina	CSS	·	2.1 km	MPC · JPL
666263	2010 CU_{74}	—	November 17, 2008	Kitt Peak	Spacewatch	AGN	990 m	MPC · JPL
666264	2010 CF_{75}	—	October 29, 2008	Kitt Peak	Spacewatch	·	2.8 km	MPC · JPL
666265	2010 CJ_{81}	—	December 3, 2005	Mauna Kea	A. Boattini	·	1.2 km	MPC · JPL
666266	2010 CY_{81}	—	February 13, 2010	Kitt Peak	Spacewatch	V	520 m	MPC · JPL
666267	2010 CX_{83}	—	February 14, 2010	Kitt Peak	Spacewatch	BAP	690 m	MPC · JPL
666268	2010 CD_{85}	—	December 3, 2005	Mauna Kea	A. Boattini	·	1.2 km	MPC · JPL
666269	2010 CX_{85}	—	February 16, 2002	Palomar	NEAT	EUN	1.6 km	MPC · JPL
666270	2010 CU_{88}	—	November 7, 2005	Mauna Kea	A. Boattini	·	890 m	MPC · JPL
666271	2010 CN_{89}	—	February 14, 2010	Mount Lemmon	Mount Lemmon Survey	·	1.6 km	MPC · JPL
666272	2010 CS_{89}	—	February 14, 2010	Mount Lemmon	Mount Lemmon Survey	·	550 m	MPC · JPL
666273	2010 CR_{90}	—	September 24, 2008	Mount Lemmon	Mount Lemmon Survey	·	1.6 km	MPC · JPL
666274	2010 CQ_{100}	—	February 14, 2010	Mount Lemmon	Mount Lemmon Survey	·	1.3 km	MPC · JPL
666275	2010 CT_{105}	—	February 14, 2010	Mount Lemmon	Mount Lemmon Survey	·	1.5 km	MPC · JPL
666276	2010 CX_{106}	—	February 14, 2010	Mount Lemmon	Mount Lemmon Survey	·	1.3 km	MPC · JPL
666277	2010 CU_{108}	—	October 9, 2008	Kitt Peak	Spacewatch	·	690 m	MPC · JPL
666278	2010 CS_{111}	—	September 4, 1999	Kitt Peak	Spacewatch	·	1.3 km	MPC · JPL
666279	2010 CF_{112}	—	February 14, 2010	Mount Lemmon	Mount Lemmon Survey	MRX	860 m	MPC · JPL
666280	2010 CY_{113}	—	October 8, 2008	Kitt Peak	Spacewatch	·	1.4 km	MPC · JPL
666281	2010 CU_{114}	—	August 10, 2007	Kitt Peak	Spacewatch	·	2.0 km	MPC · JPL
666282	2010 CQ_{115}	—	February 14, 2010	Mount Lemmon	Mount Lemmon Survey	HOF	1.9 km	MPC · JPL
666283	2010 CZ_{115}	—	February 14, 2010	Mount Lemmon	Mount Lemmon Survey	·	1.2 km	MPC · JPL
666284	2010 CV_{116}	—	February 14, 2010	Mount Lemmon	Mount Lemmon Survey	·	1.4 km	MPC · JPL
666285	2010 CT_{117}	—	January 8, 2010	Mount Lemmon	Mount Lemmon Survey	·	620 m	MPC · JPL
666286	2010 CZ_{118}	—	February 15, 2010	Mount Lemmon	Mount Lemmon Survey	·	630 m	MPC · JPL
666287	2010 CL_{124}	—	February 15, 2010	Mount Lemmon	Mount Lemmon Survey	·	1.5 km	MPC · JPL
666288	2010 CM_{143}	—	February 9, 2010	Catalina	CSS	·	560 m	MPC · JPL
666289	2010 CL_{144}	—	September 4, 2008	Kitt Peak	Spacewatch	EUN	1.3 km	MPC · JPL
666290	2010 CL_{146}	—	February 13, 2010	Mount Lemmon	Mount Lemmon Survey	·	1.4 km	MPC · JPL
666291	2010 CD_{147}	—	September 13, 2007	Mount Lemmon	Mount Lemmon Survey	PAD	1.4 km	MPC · JPL
666292	2010 CG_{158}	—	September 23, 2008	Kitt Peak	Spacewatch	PAD	1.5 km	MPC · JPL
666293	2010 CO_{164}	—	January 28, 2006	Mount Lemmon	Mount Lemmon Survey	·	1.3 km	MPC · JPL
666294	2010 CL_{165}	—	January 15, 2010	Mount Lemmon	Mount Lemmon Survey	(2076)	790 m	MPC · JPL
666295	2010 CN_{173}	—	February 9, 2010	Kitt Peak	Spacewatch	·	1.5 km	MPC · JPL
666296	2010 CZ_{175}	—	February 9, 2010	Mount Lemmon	Mount Lemmon Survey	H	390 m	MPC · JPL
666297	2010 CS_{185}	—	February 13, 2010	Mount Lemmon	Mount Lemmon Survey	·	1.4 km	MPC · JPL
666298	2010 CL_{249}	—	February 3, 2006	Mount Lemmon	Mount Lemmon Survey	·	1.2 km	MPC · JPL
666299	2010 CB_{252}	—	March 23, 2015	Haleakala	Pan-STARRS 1	·	1.5 km	MPC · JPL
666300	2010 CO_{255}	—	January 26, 2012	Haleakala	Pan-STARRS 1	L4	7.6 km	MPC · JPL

== 666301–666400 ==
back to top

Designation			Discovery			Properties		Ref
Permanent	Provisional	Named after	Date	Site	Discoverer(s)	Category	Diam.	Ref
666301	2010 CN_{270}	—	May 8, 2014	Haleakala	Pan-STARRS 1	·	540 m	MPC · JPL
666302	2010 CT_{270}	—	April 6, 2011	Mount Lemmon	Mount Lemmon Survey	·	1.8 km	MPC · JPL
666303	2010 CD_{271}	—	December 27, 2013	Mount Lemmon	Mount Lemmon Survey	·	1.6 km	MPC · JPL
666304	2010 CK_{271}	—	January 2, 2017	Haleakala	Pan-STARRS 1	·	630 m	MPC · JPL
666305	2010 CM_{273}	—	November 27, 2013	Haleakala	Pan-STARRS 1	·	1.4 km	MPC · JPL
666306	2010 CR_{274}	—	February 15, 2010	Mount Lemmon	Mount Lemmon Survey	·	820 m	MPC · JPL
666307	2010 DB	—	February 16, 2010	Catalina	CSS	H	680 m	MPC · JPL
666308	2010 DU_{3}	—	December 18, 2009	Mount Lemmon	Mount Lemmon Survey	·	1.9 km	MPC · JPL
666309	2010 DV_{4}	—	January 8, 2010	Kitt Peak	Spacewatch	·	2.1 km	MPC · JPL
666310	2010 DG_{5}	—	February 16, 2010	Mount Lemmon	Mount Lemmon Survey	·	1.3 km	MPC · JPL
666311	2010 DQ_{5}	—	February 16, 2010	Mount Lemmon	Mount Lemmon Survey	·	560 m	MPC · JPL
666312 Aroneisenberg	2010 DS_{9}	Aroneisenberg	February 16, 2010	Mount Lemmon	Mount Lemmon Survey	·	1.4 km	MPC · JPL
666313	2010 DB_{10}	—	January 12, 1996	Kitt Peak	Spacewatch	·	1.3 km	MPC · JPL
666314	2010 DR_{21}	—	October 31, 2005	Mauna Kea	A. Boattini	EUN	1.3 km	MPC · JPL
666315	2010 DS_{35}	—	January 12, 2010	Kitt Peak	Spacewatch	·	660 m	MPC · JPL
666316	2010 DE_{36}	—	February 16, 2010	Mount Lemmon	Mount Lemmon Survey	·	610 m	MPC · JPL
666317	2010 DA_{37}	—	January 30, 2006	Kitt Peak	Spacewatch	·	960 m	MPC · JPL
666318	2010 DY_{38}	—	February 16, 2010	Mount Lemmon	Mount Lemmon Survey	·	1.4 km	MPC · JPL
666319	2010 DV_{40}	—	December 15, 2009	Mount Lemmon	Mount Lemmon Survey	·	710 m	MPC · JPL
666320	2010 DG_{76}	—	August 26, 2003	Cerro Tololo	Deep Ecliptic Survey	·	1.2 km	MPC · JPL
666321	2010 DY_{93}	—	February 17, 2010	Kitt Peak	Spacewatch	·	1.6 km	MPC · JPL
666322	2010 DW_{104}	—	June 16, 2010	Mount Lemmon	Mount Lemmon Survey	·	1.6 km	MPC · JPL
666323	2010 DP_{106}	—	February 16, 2010	Mount Lemmon	Mount Lemmon Survey	·	770 m	MPC · JPL
666324	2010 DV_{109}	—	December 29, 2013	Haleakala	Pan-STARRS 1	·	1.5 km	MPC · JPL
666325	2010 DY_{109}	—	September 15, 2017	Haleakala	Pan-STARRS 1	GEF	1.1 km	MPC · JPL
666326	2010 DF_{110}	—	June 3, 2016	Calar Alto-CASADO	Hellmich, S., Mottola, S.	·	1.6 km	MPC · JPL
666327	2010 DC_{115}	—	February 18, 2010	Mauna Kea	P. A. Wiegert	·	1.2 km	MPC · JPL
666328	2010 EJ_{33}	—	February 18, 2010	Kitt Peak	Spacewatch	EUN	860 m	MPC · JPL
666329	2010 EL_{36}	—	March 12, 2010	Mount Lemmon	Mount Lemmon Survey	·	1.9 km	MPC · JPL
666330	2010 EY_{40}	—	March 4, 2005	Mount Lemmon	Mount Lemmon Survey	KOR	1.4 km	MPC · JPL
666331	2010 EL_{42}	—	March 13, 2010	Pla D'Arguines	R. Ferrando, Ferrando, M.	·	2.2 km	MPC · JPL
666332	2010 ED_{43}	—	March 13, 2010	Mount Lemmon	Mount Lemmon Survey	AMO	380 m	MPC · JPL
666333	2010 EU_{45}	—	March 26, 2006	Kitt Peak	Spacewatch	·	1.6 km	MPC · JPL
666334	2010 EX_{73}	—	March 14, 2010	Kitt Peak	Spacewatch	·	1.5 km	MPC · JPL
666335	2010 EQ_{79}	—	March 12, 2010	Mount Lemmon	Mount Lemmon Survey	·	1.8 km	MPC · JPL
666336	2010 EO_{80}	—	November 19, 2003	Anderson Mesa	LONEOS	·	1.9 km	MPC · JPL
666337	2010 EK_{84}	—	September 10, 2008	Kitt Peak	Spacewatch	·	1.1 km	MPC · JPL
666338	2010 ER_{86}	—	April 30, 2006	Kitt Peak	Spacewatch	·	1.6 km	MPC · JPL
666339	2010 EN_{90}	—	February 16, 2010	Kitt Peak	Spacewatch	·	570 m	MPC · JPL
666340	2010 EO_{90}	—	March 14, 2010	Mount Lemmon	Mount Lemmon Survey	AGN	990 m	MPC · JPL
666341	2010 ES_{93}	—	February 4, 2005	Kitt Peak	Spacewatch	AGN	1.1 km	MPC · JPL
666342	2010 EK_{95}	—	November 1, 2005	Mount Lemmon	Mount Lemmon Survey	·	650 m	MPC · JPL
666343	2010 EX_{95}	—	August 10, 2007	Kitt Peak	Spacewatch	·	2.1 km	MPC · JPL
666344	2010 EQ_{97}	—	March 14, 2010	Mount Lemmon	Mount Lemmon Survey	·	2.0 km	MPC · JPL
666345	2010 EU_{99}	—	March 13, 2004	Kitt Peak	Spacewatch	·	2.7 km	MPC · JPL
666346	2010 EJ_{100}	—	March 14, 2010	Siding Spring	SSS	PHO	770 m	MPC · JPL
666347	2010 EC_{108}	—	March 13, 2010	Kitt Peak	Spacewatch	·	1.6 km	MPC · JPL
666348	2010 EN_{109}	—	December 1, 2005	Kitt Peak	Wasserman, L. H., Millis, R. L.	(5)	1.3 km	MPC · JPL
666349	2010 EB_{114}	—	November 1, 2008	Kitt Peak	Spacewatch	·	580 m	MPC · JPL
666350	2010 EC_{114}	—	February 23, 2003	Kitt Peak	Spacewatch	(2076)	890 m	MPC · JPL
666351	2010 EA_{128}	—	March 21, 2010	Catalina	CSS	·	610 m	MPC · JPL
666352	2010 EW_{134}	—	October 13, 2001	Kitt Peak	Spacewatch	·	850 m	MPC · JPL
666353	2010 EU_{171}	—	March 11, 2010	Palomar	Palomar Transient Factory	BRA	1.4 km	MPC · JPL
666354	2010 EG_{187}	—	April 13, 2011	Haleakala	Pan-STARRS 1	·	1.4 km	MPC · JPL
666355	2010 EZ_{187}	—	August 14, 2012	Haleakala	Pan-STARRS 1	·	1.4 km	MPC · JPL
666356	2010 EB_{188}	—	March 4, 2010	Kitt Peak	Spacewatch	·	690 m	MPC · JPL
666357	2010 ET_{189}	—	September 19, 2017	Haleakala	Pan-STARRS 1	·	1.4 km	MPC · JPL
666358	2010 EN_{191}	—	March 12, 2010	Catalina	CSS	·	890 m	MPC · JPL
666359	2010 FJ_{4}	—	March 16, 2010	Mount Lemmon	Mount Lemmon Survey	·	1.4 km	MPC · JPL
666360	2010 FC_{6}	—	March 18, 2010	Mount Lemmon	Mount Lemmon Survey	APO	320 m	MPC · JPL
666361	2010 FF_{11}	—	September 29, 2008	Kitt Peak	Spacewatch	DOR	1.8 km	MPC · JPL
666362	2010 FX_{11}	—	October 8, 2004	Kitt Peak	Spacewatch	V	510 m	MPC · JPL
666363	2010 FD_{12}	—	December 3, 2008	Mount Lemmon	Mount Lemmon Survey	·	1.6 km	MPC · JPL
666364	2010 FF_{12}	—	March 16, 2010	Kitt Peak	Spacewatch	·	600 m	MPC · JPL
666365	2010 FE_{17}	—	September 18, 2003	Kitt Peak	Spacewatch	·	1.3 km	MPC · JPL
666366	2010 FQ_{17}	—	September 18, 2003	Kitt Peak	Spacewatch	·	1.5 km	MPC · JPL
666367	2010 FP_{18}	—	February 18, 2010	Kitt Peak	Spacewatch	·	660 m	MPC · JPL
666368	2010 FS_{21}	—	May 2, 2006	Mount Lemmon	Mount Lemmon Survey	·	1.7 km	MPC · JPL
666369	2010 FZ_{21}	—	March 18, 2010	Mount Lemmon	Mount Lemmon Survey	·	610 m	MPC · JPL
666370	2010 FN_{25}	—	March 15, 2010	Kitt Peak	Spacewatch	·	990 m	MPC · JPL
666371	2010 FQ_{26}	—	March 19, 2010	Mount Lemmon	Mount Lemmon Survey	·	840 m	MPC · JPL
666372	2010 FY_{47}	—	March 22, 2010	ESA OGS	ESA OGS	·	850 m	MPC · JPL
666373	2010 FC_{55}	—	March 21, 2010	Kitt Peak	Spacewatch	MAR	1.3 km	MPC · JPL
666374	2010 FY_{85}	—	May 4, 2006	Kitt Peak	Spacewatch	·	1.1 km	MPC · JPL
666375	2010 FE_{88}	—	March 21, 2010	Catalina	CSS	PHO	800 m	MPC · JPL
666376	2010 FB_{123}	—	March 19, 2010	Mount Lemmon	Mount Lemmon Survey	·	830 m	MPC · JPL
666377	2010 FO_{131}	—	January 4, 2016	Haleakala	Pan-STARRS 1	·	2.8 km	MPC · JPL
666378	2010 FX_{136}	—	December 17, 2009	Kitt Peak	Spacewatch	·	1.4 km	MPC · JPL
666379	2010 FQ_{137}	—	August 14, 2012	Haleakala	Pan-STARRS 1	·	1.7 km	MPC · JPL
666380	2010 FT_{137}	—	April 23, 2015	Haleakala	Pan-STARRS 1	BRA	1.2 km	MPC · JPL
666381	2010 FS_{138}	—	October 21, 2015	Haleakala	Pan-STARRS 1	·	870 m	MPC · JPL
666382	2010 FN_{140}	—	December 4, 2013	Haleakala	Pan-STARRS 1	·	1.8 km	MPC · JPL
666383	2010 FP_{140}	—	April 18, 2017	Mount Lemmon	Mount Lemmon Survey	·	720 m	MPC · JPL
666384	2010 FS_{142}	—	March 18, 2010	Mount Lemmon	Mount Lemmon Survey	AGN	940 m	MPC · JPL
666385	2010 FC_{144}	—	March 20, 2010	Mount Lemmon	Mount Lemmon Survey	H	440 m	MPC · JPL
666386	2010 GX_{6}	—	April 5, 2010	Mount Lemmon	Mount Lemmon Survey	·	1.6 km	MPC · JPL
666387	2010 GR_{27}	—	September 30, 2003	Kitt Peak	Spacewatch	·	1.4 km	MPC · JPL
666388	2010 GK_{67}	—	April 14, 2010	Catalina	CSS	PHO	900 m	MPC · JPL
666389	2010 GB_{99}	—	March 4, 2005	Kitt Peak	Spacewatch	AGN	1.3 km	MPC · JPL
666390	2010 GE_{111}	—	March 8, 2005	Mount Lemmon	Mount Lemmon Survey	·	1.6 km	MPC · JPL
666391	2010 GN_{111}	—	March 24, 2003	Kitt Peak	Spacewatch	·	640 m	MPC · JPL
666392	2010 GP_{118}	—	September 13, 2007	Mount Lemmon	Mount Lemmon Survey	·	1.6 km	MPC · JPL
666393	2010 GA_{124}	—	September 11, 2007	Mount Lemmon	Mount Lemmon Survey	·	2.0 km	MPC · JPL
666394	2010 GE_{124}	—	March 18, 2010	Kitt Peak	Spacewatch	·	960 m	MPC · JPL
666395	2010 GD_{128}	—	May 1, 2006	Kitt Peak	Spacewatch	·	960 m	MPC · JPL
666396	2010 GW_{132}	—	January 2, 2009	Kitt Peak	Spacewatch	·	2.1 km	MPC · JPL
666397	2010 GS_{133}	—	March 12, 2005	Kitt Peak	Deep Ecliptic Survey	KOR	1.2 km	MPC · JPL
666398	2010 GF_{136}	—	August 21, 2007	Anderson Mesa	LONEOS	·	780 m	MPC · JPL
666399	2010 GF_{138}	—	February 2, 2005	Kitt Peak	Spacewatch	·	1.6 km	MPC · JPL
666400	2010 GK_{138}	—	March 11, 2005	Mount Lemmon	Mount Lemmon Survey	·	1.7 km	MPC · JPL

== 666401–666500 ==
back to top

Designation			Discovery			Properties		Ref
Permanent	Provisional	Named after	Date	Site	Discoverer(s)	Category	Diam.	Ref
666401	2010 GV_{138}	—	October 30, 2007	Mount Lemmon	Mount Lemmon Survey	GAL	1.4 km	MPC · JPL
666402	2010 GD_{141}	—	April 8, 2010	Kitt Peak	Spacewatch	·	670 m	MPC · JPL
666403	2010 GS_{161}	—	May 15, 2002	Palomar	NEAT	H	760 m	MPC · JPL
666404	2010 GS_{171}	—	March 26, 2003	Palomar	NEAT	·	770 m	MPC · JPL
666405	2010 GZ_{183}	—	April 8, 2010	WISE	WISE	·	1.2 km	MPC · JPL
666406	2010 GA_{199}	—	January 4, 2014	Haleakala	Pan-STARRS 1	·	1.9 km	MPC · JPL
666407	2010 GF_{199}	—	January 20, 2013	Kitt Peak	Spacewatch	·	1.2 km	MPC · JPL
666408	2010 GL_{199}	—	July 28, 2011	Haleakala	Pan-STARRS 1	·	1.5 km	MPC · JPL
666409	2010 GQ_{199}	—	October 15, 2012	Haleakala	Pan-STARRS 1	·	1.6 km	MPC · JPL
666410	2010 GF_{201}	—	October 8, 2012	Mount Lemmon	Mount Lemmon Survey	·	1.5 km	MPC · JPL
666411	2010 GB_{202}	—	April 6, 2010	Mount Lemmon	Mount Lemmon Survey	·	1.2 km	MPC · JPL
666412	2010 GA_{203}	—	July 30, 2017	Haleakala	Pan-STARRS 1	KOR	1.1 km	MPC · JPL
666413	2010 GY_{205}	—	February 21, 2017	Haleakala	Pan-STARRS 1	·	830 m	MPC · JPL
666414	2010 GX_{206}	—	April 14, 2010	Mount Lemmon	Mount Lemmon Survey	·	2.1 km	MPC · JPL
666415	2010 GJ_{207}	—	April 9, 2010	Kitt Peak	Spacewatch	·	980 m	MPC · JPL
666416	2010 GX_{209}	—	April 9, 2010	Mount Lemmon	Mount Lemmon Survey	·	1.8 km	MPC · JPL
666417	2010 HQ_{23}	—	April 8, 2010	Mount Lemmon	Mount Lemmon Survey	·	640 m	MPC · JPL
666418	2010 HB_{108}	—	November 19, 2008	Kitt Peak	Spacewatch	·	1.2 km	MPC · JPL
666419	2010 HX_{115}	—	October 7, 2008	Kitt Peak	Spacewatch	·	1.4 km	MPC · JPL
666420	2010 HZ_{131}	—	September 21, 2016	Haleakala	Pan-STARRS 1	·	2.6 km	MPC · JPL
666421	2010 JQ_{2}	—	January 18, 2009	Kitt Peak	Spacewatch	·	1.2 km	MPC · JPL
666422	2010 JG_{30}	—	May 3, 2010	Kitt Peak	Spacewatch	·	2.5 km	MPC · JPL
666423	2010 JR_{35}	—	May 5, 2010	Mount Lemmon	Mount Lemmon Survey	·	1.6 km	MPC · JPL
666424	2010 JW_{36}	—	May 6, 2010	Mount Lemmon	Mount Lemmon Survey	·	1.8 km	MPC · JPL
666425	2010 JM_{46}	—	November 12, 2001	Apache Point	SDSS Collaboration	·	2.9 km	MPC · JPL
666426	2010 JK_{82}	—	May 11, 2010	Mount Lemmon	Mount Lemmon Survey	·	990 m	MPC · JPL
666427	2010 JR_{87}	—	May 12, 2010	Mount Lemmon	Mount Lemmon Survey	·	890 m	MPC · JPL
666428	2010 JC_{111}	—	May 11, 2010	Mount Lemmon	Mount Lemmon Survey	V	600 m	MPC · JPL
666429	2010 JA_{117}	—	May 7, 2010	Mount Lemmon	Mount Lemmon Survey	·	730 m	MPC · JPL
666430	2010 JM_{118}	—	September 26, 2007	Mount Lemmon	Mount Lemmon Survey	·	1.9 km	MPC · JPL
666431	2010 JC_{148}	—	August 10, 2007	Kitt Peak	Spacewatch	·	1.0 km	MPC · JPL
666432	2010 JG_{148}	—	May 13, 2010	Siding Spring	SSS	·	1.4 km	MPC · JPL
666433	2010 JZ_{153}	—	April 9, 2010	Mount Lemmon	Mount Lemmon Survey	·	990 m	MPC · JPL
666434	2010 JR_{154}	—	May 6, 2010	Kitt Peak	Spacewatch	EOS	1.6 km	MPC · JPL
666435	2010 JD_{156}	—	September 28, 2003	Kitt Peak	Spacewatch	·	1.7 km	MPC · JPL
666436	2010 JM_{158}	—	September 14, 2007	Mount Lemmon	Mount Lemmon Survey	·	1.4 km	MPC · JPL
666437	2010 JH_{162}	—	April 9, 2010	Mount Lemmon	Mount Lemmon Survey	·	910 m	MPC · JPL
666438	2010 JK_{167}	—	May 11, 2010	Mount Lemmon	Mount Lemmon Survey	·	1.7 km	MPC · JPL
666439	2010 JZ_{168}	—	January 2, 2009	Kitt Peak	Spacewatch	·	1.8 km	MPC · JPL
666440	2010 JT_{169}	—	December 2, 2008	Kitt Peak	Spacewatch	·	1.8 km	MPC · JPL
666441	2010 JK_{170}	—	May 3, 2010	Kitt Peak	Spacewatch	·	630 m	MPC · JPL
666442	2010 JU_{172}	—	December 15, 2007	Mount Lemmon	Mount Lemmon Survey	·	2.4 km	MPC · JPL
666443	2010 JE_{176}	—	April 11, 2003	Kitt Peak	Spacewatch	·	790 m	MPC · JPL
666444	2010 JZ_{183}	—	October 1, 2008	Kitt Peak	Spacewatch	NEM	2.1 km	MPC · JPL
666445	2010 JK_{184}	—	January 4, 2014	Haleakala	Pan-STARRS 1	·	1.2 km	MPC · JPL
666446	2010 JM_{191}	—	November 2, 2008	Kitt Peak	Spacewatch	HOF	2.3 km	MPC · JPL
666447	2010 JT_{196}	—	February 2, 2008	Mount Lemmon	Mount Lemmon Survey	·	1.7 km	MPC · JPL
666448	2010 JZ_{209}	—	July 5, 2016	Kitt Peak	Spacewatch	·	1.4 km	MPC · JPL
666449	2010 JJ_{210}	—	May 14, 2010	Haleakala	Pan-STARRS 1	SDO	152 km	MPC · JPL
666450	2010 JO_{210}	—	February 9, 2013	Haleakala	Pan-STARRS 1	·	720 m	MPC · JPL
666451	2010 JR_{210}	—	January 15, 2013	ESA OGS	ESA OGS	·	2.5 km	MPC · JPL
666452	2010 JD_{211}	—	September 26, 2011	Catalina	CSS	·	1.7 km	MPC · JPL
666453	2010 JW_{212}	—	May 21, 2014	Haleakala	Pan-STARRS 1	·	800 m	MPC · JPL
666454	2010 JH_{213}	—	April 23, 2015	Haleakala	Pan-STARRS 1	BRA	1.1 km	MPC · JPL
666455	2010 KR_{38}	—	November 2, 2007	Kitt Peak	Spacewatch	·	1.7 km	MPC · JPL
666456	2010 KB_{131}	—	February 28, 2014	Haleakala	Pan-STARRS 1	TIR	2.7 km	MPC · JPL
666457	2010 KF_{143}	—	October 29, 2016	Mount Lemmon	Mount Lemmon Survey	·	2.3 km	MPC · JPL
666458	2010 KR_{153}	—	April 4, 2014	Haleakala	Pan-STARRS 1	·	2.9 km	MPC · JPL
666459	2010 KB_{155}	—	October 23, 2005	Kitt Peak	Spacewatch	·	2.2 km	MPC · JPL
666460	2010 KL_{157}	—	May 17, 2010	Mount Lemmon	Mount Lemmon Survey	·	1.5 km	MPC · JPL
666461	2010 KV_{157}	—	May 22, 2015	Haleakala	Pan-STARRS 1	NAE	1.6 km	MPC · JPL
666462	2010 LM_{61}	—	September 5, 2002	Socorro	LINEAR	EUN	1.2 km	MPC · JPL
666463	2010 LZ_{62}	—	June 7, 2010	ESA OGS	ESA OGS	·	680 m	MPC · JPL
666464	2010 LO_{109}	—	June 6, 2010	Kitt Peak	Spacewatch	·	1.9 km	MPC · JPL
666465	2010 LW_{111}	—	April 4, 2005	Mount Lemmon	Mount Lemmon Survey	·	1.9 km	MPC · JPL
666466	2010 LN_{112}	—	January 13, 2008	Mount Lemmon	Mount Lemmon Survey	·	1.6 km	MPC · JPL
666467	2010 LD_{136}	—	August 22, 2012	Haleakala	Pan-STARRS 1	3:2	4.1 km	MPC · JPL
666468	2010 LC_{141}	—	March 24, 2006	Kitt Peak	Spacewatch	(5)	1.3 km	MPC · JPL
666469	2010 LD_{143}	—	October 25, 2001	Apache Point	SDSS Collaboration	HOF	2.6 km	MPC · JPL
666470	2010 LD_{158}	—	April 5, 2014	Haleakala	Pan-STARRS 1	·	2.0 km	MPC · JPL
666471	2010 LX_{158}	—	December 4, 2015	Mount Lemmon	Mount Lemmon Survey	·	1.0 km	MPC · JPL
666472	2010 ML_{3}	—	May 24, 2010	Mount Lemmon	Mount Lemmon Survey	·	980 m	MPC · JPL
666473	2010 MW_{4}	—	June 16, 2010	Kitt Peak	Spacewatch	·	2.9 km	MPC · JPL
666474	2010 MD_{117}	—	November 29, 2013	Mount Lemmon	Mount Lemmon Survey	·	1.6 km	MPC · JPL
666475	2010 MH_{118}	—	May 1, 2014	Mount Lemmon	Mount Lemmon Survey	EOS	1.4 km	MPC · JPL
666476	2010 MR_{119}	—	October 4, 2016	XuYi	PMO NEO Survey Program	EUP	3.0 km	MPC · JPL
666477	2010 MO_{130}	—	April 20, 2004	Kitt Peak	Spacewatch	·	1.5 km	MPC · JPL
666478	2010 MQ_{130}	—	September 25, 2016	Haleakala	Pan-STARRS 1	LIX	3.1 km	MPC · JPL
666479 Maratmingaliev	2010 MF_{132}	Maratmingaliev	October 30, 2011	Zelenchukskaya Stn	T. V. Krjačko, Satovski, B.	·	1.1 km	MPC · JPL
666480	2010 MS_{136}	—	September 22, 2015	Haleakala	Pan-STARRS 1	TIN	780 m	MPC · JPL
666481	2010 MG_{141}	—	February 23, 2017	Mount Lemmon	Mount Lemmon Survey	·	830 m	MPC · JPL
666482	2010 MM_{143}	—	December 21, 2006	Mount Lemmon	Mount Lemmon Survey	·	2.6 km	MPC · JPL
666483	2010 MA_{147}	—	March 8, 2014	Mount Lemmon	Mount Lemmon Survey	EOS	1.9 km	MPC · JPL
666484	2010 ML_{147}	—	June 28, 2014	Haleakala	Pan-STARRS 1	·	810 m	MPC · JPL
666485	2010 MV_{148}	—	November 7, 2015	Mount Lemmon	Mount Lemmon Survey	·	840 m	MPC · JPL
666486	2010 MT_{149}	—	November 9, 2018	Mount Lemmon	Mount Lemmon Survey	·	2.5 km	MPC · JPL
666487	2010 NJ_{66}	—	December 18, 2003	Palomar	NEAT	H	600 m	MPC · JPL
666488	2010 NL_{112}	—	July 13, 2010	WISE	WISE	·	2.8 km	MPC · JPL
666489	2010 NP_{122}	—	September 16, 2010	Kitt Peak	Spacewatch	DOR	2.5 km	MPC · JPL
666490	2010 NE_{126}	—	November 1, 2006	Mount Lemmon	Mount Lemmon Survey	·	2.1 km	MPC · JPL
666491	2010 NG_{146}	—	April 16, 2013	Cerro Tololo-DECam	DECam	centaur	90 km	MPC · JPL
666492	2010 NU_{146}	—	November 21, 2014	Haleakala	Pan-STARRS 1	H	540 m	MPC · JPL
666493	2010 NF_{147}	—	July 4, 2010	Mount Lemmon	Mount Lemmon Survey	EOS	2.0 km	MPC · JPL
666494	2010 NP_{147}	—	June 5, 2014	Haleakala	Pan-STARRS 1	·	1.5 km	MPC · JPL
666495	2010 OB_{14}	—	July 17, 2010	WISE	WISE	·	4.0 km	MPC · JPL
666496	2010 OT_{128}	—	October 13, 2010	Catalina	CSS	·	3.1 km	MPC · JPL
666497	2010 OM_{133}	—	November 10, 2016	Mount Lemmon	Mount Lemmon Survey	LUT	3.6 km	MPC · JPL
666498	2010 OF_{134}	—	October 1, 2005	Mount Lemmon	Mount Lemmon Survey	·	2.4 km	MPC · JPL
666499	2010 OG_{138}	—	December 25, 2017	Mount Lemmon	Mount Lemmon Survey	·	3.0 km	MPC · JPL
666500	2010 OW_{141}	—	April 14, 2008	Kitt Peak	Spacewatch	·	2.0 km	MPC · JPL

== 666501–666600 ==
back to top

Designation			Discovery			Properties		Ref
Permanent	Provisional	Named after	Date	Site	Discoverer(s)	Category	Diam.	Ref
666501	2010 OD_{148}	—	June 20, 2015	Haleakala	Pan-STARRS 1	·	3.0 km	MPC · JPL
666502	2010 PA_{1}	—	August 2, 2010	Socorro	LINEAR	·	960 m	MPC · JPL
666503	2010 PL_{2}	—	October 15, 2007	Mount Lemmon	Mount Lemmon Survey	·	1.0 km	MPC · JPL
666504	2010 PN_{8}	—	April 28, 2005	Goodricke-Pigott	R. A. Tucker	·	2.2 km	MPC · JPL
666505	2010 PR_{22}	—	August 8, 2010	Dauban	C. Rinner, Kugel, F.	·	2.0 km	MPC · JPL
666506	2010 PV_{22}	—	August 8, 2010	Dauban	C. Rinner, Kugel, F.	·	1.1 km	MPC · JPL
666507	2010 PU_{57}	—	May 16, 2005	Mount Lemmon	Mount Lemmon Survey	·	1.4 km	MPC · JPL
666508	2010 PR_{59}	—	February 26, 2008	Mount Lemmon	Mount Lemmon Survey	EOS	1.4 km	MPC · JPL
666509	2010 PQ_{63}	—	August 13, 2010	Socorro	LINEAR	·	1.1 km	MPC · JPL
666510	2010 PM_{79}	—	August 12, 2010	Kitt Peak	Spacewatch	·	2.4 km	MPC · JPL
666511	2010 PV_{79}	—	August 10, 2010	Kitt Peak	Spacewatch	·	2.2 km	MPC · JPL
666512	2010 PF_{80}	—	August 12, 2010	Kitt Peak	Spacewatch	·	2.4 km	MPC · JPL
666513	2010 PJ_{86}	—	August 12, 2015	Haleakala	Pan-STARRS 1	VER	2.4 km	MPC · JPL
666514	2010 PS_{86}	—	August 4, 2010	WISE	WISE	·	1.2 km	MPC · JPL
666515	2010 PM_{88}	—	September 2, 2014	Haleakala	Pan-STARRS 1	·	860 m	MPC · JPL
666516	2010 PP_{88}	—	August 12, 2010	Kitt Peak	Spacewatch	THM	2.2 km	MPC · JPL
666517	2010 PV_{92}	—	August 4, 2010	WISE	WISE	EOS	1.4 km	MPC · JPL
666518	2010 PQ_{93}	—	April 27, 2001	Mauna Kea	Pittichová, J., K. J. Meech	·	2.7 km	MPC · JPL
666519	2010 QH	—	August 16, 2010	La Sagra	OAM	·	910 m	MPC · JPL
666520	2010 QO	—	May 17, 2009	Kitt Peak	Spacewatch	·	3.0 km	MPC · JPL
666521	2010 QL_{2}	—	August 19, 2010	XuYi	PMO NEO Survey Program	·	2.1 km	MPC · JPL
666522	2010 QL_{3}	—	June 15, 2010	Mount Lemmon	Mount Lemmon Survey	·	2.5 km	MPC · JPL
666523	2010 QL_{4}	—	August 18, 2010	XuYi	PMO NEO Survey Program	NYS	1.2 km	MPC · JPL
666524	2010 QU_{6}	—	June 19, 2010	Mount Lemmon	Mount Lemmon Survey	MAS	710 m	MPC · JPL
666525	2010 QG_{7}	—	September 17, 2010	Mount Lemmon	Mount Lemmon Survey	·	2.1 km	MPC · JPL
666526	2010 QS_{7}	—	August 20, 2010	Bergisch Gladbach	W. Bickel	·	2.7 km	MPC · JPL
666527	2010 RW_{2}	—	October 17, 2003	Kitt Peak	Spacewatch	·	1.2 km	MPC · JPL
666528	2010 RA_{3}	—	August 20, 2010	La Sagra	OAM	NYS	960 m	MPC · JPL
666529	2010 RA_{8}	—	September 2, 2010	Mount Lemmon	Mount Lemmon Survey	EOS	1.5 km	MPC · JPL
666530	2010 RX_{9}	—	September 3, 2010	Mount Lemmon	Mount Lemmon Survey	·	1.8 km	MPC · JPL
666531	2010 RV_{12}	—	September 4, 2010	Mount Lemmon	Mount Lemmon Survey	·	960 m	MPC · JPL
666532	2010 RW_{14}	—	September 2, 2010	Mount Lemmon	Mount Lemmon Survey	·	1.6 km	MPC · JPL
666533	2010 RX_{17}	—	September 2, 2010	Socorro	LINEAR	·	1.4 km	MPC · JPL
666534	2010 RT_{18}	—	September 2, 2010	Mount Lemmon	Mount Lemmon Survey	·	540 m	MPC · JPL
666535	2010 RK_{19}	—	September 3, 2010	Mount Lemmon	Mount Lemmon Survey	·	600 m	MPC · JPL
666536	2010 RF_{20}	—	September 3, 2010	Socorro	LINEAR	·	2.3 km	MPC · JPL
666537	2010 RO_{20}	—	September 3, 2010	Mount Lemmon	Mount Lemmon Survey	·	690 m	MPC · JPL
666538	2010 RK_{23}	—	September 3, 2010	Mount Lemmon	Mount Lemmon Survey	·	970 m	MPC · JPL
666539	2010 RJ_{27}	—	February 13, 2008	Kitt Peak	Spacewatch	·	1.5 km	MPC · JPL
666540	2010 RU_{29}	—	September 4, 2010	Mount Lemmon	Mount Lemmon Survey	·	1.0 km	MPC · JPL
666541	2010 RZ_{30}	—	September 5, 2010	Mount Lemmon	Mount Lemmon Survey	H	250 m	MPC · JPL
666542	2010 RG_{32}	—	February 8, 2008	Kitt Peak	Spacewatch	EOS	1.7 km	MPC · JPL
666543	2010 RZ_{33}	—	September 27, 2006	Kitt Peak	Spacewatch	·	1.5 km	MPC · JPL
666544	2010 RN_{35}	—	February 20, 2002	Kitt Peak	Spacewatch	·	2.5 km	MPC · JPL
666545	2010 RU_{36}	—	September 2, 2010	Mount Lemmon	Mount Lemmon Survey	HYG	2.3 km	MPC · JPL
666546	2010 RT_{40}	—	September 3, 2010	Piszkés-tető	K. Sárneczky, Z. Kuli	·	2.0 km	MPC · JPL
666547	2010 RO_{43}	—	September 3, 2010	Mount Lemmon	Mount Lemmon Survey	·	2.4 km	MPC · JPL
666548	2010 RA_{44}	—	September 4, 2010	Piszkés-tető	K. Sárneczky, Z. Kuli	AGN	1.3 km	MPC · JPL
666549	2010 RH_{50}	—	September 4, 2010	Kitt Peak	Spacewatch	·	950 m	MPC · JPL
666550	2010 RQ_{51}	—	September 4, 2010	Kitt Peak	Spacewatch	·	1.7 km	MPC · JPL
666551	2010 RY_{51}	—	September 4, 2010	Kitt Peak	Spacewatch	·	2.6 km	MPC · JPL
666552	2010 RJ_{55}	—	September 5, 2010	Mount Lemmon	Mount Lemmon Survey	·	1.8 km	MPC · JPL
666553	2010 RJ_{56}	—	May 15, 2009	Kitt Peak	Spacewatch	·	1.3 km	MPC · JPL
666554	2010 RZ_{56}	—	September 5, 2010	Mount Lemmon	Mount Lemmon Survey	·	750 m	MPC · JPL
666555	2010 RQ_{61}	—	September 6, 2010	Kitt Peak	Spacewatch	·	1.1 km	MPC · JPL
666556	2010 RG_{62}	—	September 7, 2010	La Sagra	OAM	·	940 m	MPC · JPL
666557	2010 RP_{62}	—	November 30, 2003	Kitt Peak	Spacewatch	·	1.2 km	MPC · JPL
666558	2010 RX_{62}	—	August 13, 2010	Kitt Peak	Spacewatch	TIR	2.2 km	MPC · JPL
666559	2010 RV_{64}	—	September 1, 2010	Mount Lemmon	Mount Lemmon Survey	·	1 km	MPC · JPL
666560	2010 RS_{66}	—	August 3, 2010	Kitt Peak	Spacewatch	·	1.2 km	MPC · JPL
666561	2010 RF_{67}	—	September 5, 2010	Dauban	C. Rinner, Kugel, F.	LIX	2.8 km	MPC · JPL
666562	2010 RM_{71}	—	September 2, 2010	Mount Lemmon	Mount Lemmon Survey	H	340 m	MPC · JPL
666563	2010 RQ_{71}	—	August 12, 2010	Kitt Peak	Spacewatch	·	2.8 km	MPC · JPL
666564	2010 RU_{74}	—	September 5, 2010	Dauban	C. Rinner, Kugel, F.	·	2.3 km	MPC · JPL
666565	2010 RP_{77}	—	October 25, 2003	Kitt Peak	Spacewatch	·	780 m	MPC · JPL
666566	2010 RW_{82}	—	August 13, 2010	Kitt Peak	Spacewatch	·	900 m	MPC · JPL
666567	2010 RL_{83}	—	September 1, 2010	Mount Lemmon	Mount Lemmon Survey	EOS	1.6 km	MPC · JPL
666568	2010 RD_{84}	—	September 2, 2010	Mount Lemmon	Mount Lemmon Survey	·	1.7 km	MPC · JPL
666569	2010 RH_{85}	—	September 2, 2010	Mount Lemmon	Mount Lemmon Survey	·	1.9 km	MPC · JPL
666570	2010 RJ_{86}	—	September 2, 2010	Mount Lemmon	Mount Lemmon Survey	·	730 m	MPC · JPL
666571	2010 RR_{87}	—	September 3, 2010	Mount Lemmon	Mount Lemmon Survey	EOS	1.4 km	MPC · JPL
666572	2010 RM_{91}	—	September 10, 2010	Kitt Peak	Spacewatch	·	2.5 km	MPC · JPL
666573	2010 RP_{92}	—	September 11, 2010	Mount Lemmon	Mount Lemmon Survey	·	2.4 km	MPC · JPL
666574	2010 RD_{94}	—	September 12, 2010	Mount Lemmon	Mount Lemmon Survey	AEG	2.7 km	MPC · JPL
666575	2010 RW_{94}	—	September 12, 2010	Mount Lemmon	Mount Lemmon Survey	·	2.5 km	MPC · JPL
666576	2010 RG_{97}	—	September 10, 2010	La Sagra	OAM	MAS	630 m	MPC · JPL
666577	2010 RW_{106}	—	September 10, 2010	Kitt Peak	Spacewatch	·	2.4 km	MPC · JPL
666578	2010 RZ_{106}	—	January 19, 2007	Mauna Kea	P. A. Wiegert	THM	2.0 km	MPC · JPL
666579	2010 RL_{112}	—	September 11, 2010	Kitt Peak	Spacewatch	·	2.3 km	MPC · JPL
666580	2010 RY_{118}	—	September 11, 2010	Kitt Peak	Spacewatch	·	1.3 km	MPC · JPL
666581	2010 RO_{124}	—	September 11, 2010	Mount Lemmon	Mount Lemmon Survey	·	2.7 km	MPC · JPL
666582	2010 RN_{125}	—	September 12, 2010	Kitt Peak	Spacewatch	·	980 m	MPC · JPL
666583	2010 RU_{128}	—	September 14, 2010	Mount Lemmon	Mount Lemmon Survey	·	2.1 km	MPC · JPL
666584	2010 RL_{133}	—	February 10, 2007	Mount Lemmon	Mount Lemmon Survey	·	2.8 km	MPC · JPL
666585	2010 RL_{134}	—	August 13, 2010	Kitt Peak	Spacewatch	·	980 m	MPC · JPL
666586	2010 RR_{134}	—	August 15, 2006	Palomar	NEAT	·	1.1 km	MPC · JPL
666587	2010 RD_{138}	—	November 23, 2006	Kitt Peak	Spacewatch	·	1.8 km	MPC · JPL
666588	2010 RF_{144}	—	September 21, 2003	Kitt Peak	Spacewatch	·	700 m	MPC · JPL
666589	2010 RD_{147}	—	September 23, 1995	Kitt Peak	Spacewatch	·	860 m	MPC · JPL
666590	2010 RE_{148}	—	September 15, 2010	Kitt Peak	Spacewatch	·	2.8 km	MPC · JPL
666591	2010 RM_{151}	—	September 5, 2010	Kitt Peak	Spacewatch	·	2.9 km	MPC · JPL
666592	2010 RP_{155}	—	September 15, 2010	Kitt Peak	Spacewatch	EOS	1.3 km	MPC · JPL
666593	2010 RR_{156}	—	September 15, 2010	Kitt Peak	Spacewatch	EOS	1.9 km	MPC · JPL
666594	2010 RU_{157}	—	February 26, 2008	Kitt Peak	Spacewatch	·	2.5 km	MPC · JPL
666595	2010 RG_{158}	—	September 1, 2010	Mount Lemmon	Mount Lemmon Survey	·	1.1 km	MPC · JPL
666596	2010 RD_{159}	—	March 27, 2008	Mount Lemmon	Mount Lemmon Survey	·	2.0 km	MPC · JPL
666597	2010 RT_{161}	—	September 3, 2010	Mount Lemmon	Mount Lemmon Survey	EOS	2.0 km	MPC · JPL
666598	2010 RH_{164}	—	August 19, 2006	Kitt Peak	Spacewatch	·	1.0 km	MPC · JPL
666599	2010 RS_{170}	—	September 3, 2010	Mount Lemmon	Mount Lemmon Survey	EOS	1.6 km	MPC · JPL
666600	2010 RT_{172}	—	March 20, 2002	Kitt Peak	Deep Ecliptic Survey	·	1.9 km	MPC · JPL

== 666601–666700 ==
back to top

Designation			Discovery			Properties		Ref
Permanent	Provisional	Named after	Date	Site	Discoverer(s)	Category	Diam.	Ref
666601	2010 RQ_{179}	—	September 15, 2010	Haleakala	Armstrong, J. D., M. Micheli	·	960 m	MPC · JPL
666602	2010 RT_{181}	—	September 11, 2010	Mount Lemmon	Mount Lemmon Survey	TIR	2.5 km	MPC · JPL
666603	2010 RX_{189}	—	September 4, 2010	Kitt Peak	Spacewatch	·	2.6 km	MPC · JPL
666604	2010 RH_{191}	—	November 26, 2011	Mount Lemmon	Mount Lemmon Survey	LUT	4.4 km	MPC · JPL
666605	2010 RL_{191}	—	February 6, 2013	Kitt Peak	Spacewatch	EOS	1.5 km	MPC · JPL
666606	2010 RP_{192}	—	August 30, 2014	Mount Lemmon	Mount Lemmon Survey	PHO	700 m	MPC · JPL
666607	2010 RU_{192}	—	August 2, 2016	Haleakala	Pan-STARRS 1	·	2.7 km	MPC · JPL
666608	2010 RQ_{193}	—	September 15, 2010	Mount Lemmon	Mount Lemmon Survey	·	2.4 km	MPC · JPL
666609	2010 RV_{193}	—	February 14, 2013	Haleakala	Pan-STARRS 1	·	2.5 km	MPC · JPL
666610	2010 RY_{193}	—	October 2, 2016	Mount Lemmon	Mount Lemmon Survey	·	2.2 km	MPC · JPL
666611	2010 RU_{194}	—	September 11, 2010	Catalina	CSS	·	2.4 km	MPC · JPL
666612	2010 RJ_{196}	—	January 12, 1996	Kitt Peak	Spacewatch	·	2.5 km	MPC · JPL
666613	2010 RP_{197}	—	August 13, 2010	Kitt Peak	Spacewatch	·	910 m	MPC · JPL
666614	2010 RV_{197}	—	November 24, 2011	Mount Lemmon	Mount Lemmon Survey	·	2.6 km	MPC · JPL
666615	2010 RA_{198}	—	August 19, 2014	Haleakala	Pan-STARRS 1	·	830 m	MPC · JPL
666616	2010 RZ_{198}	—	September 26, 2014	Mount Lemmon	Mount Lemmon Survey	·	980 m	MPC · JPL
666617	2010 RB_{200}	—	September 15, 2010	Kitt Peak	Spacewatch	·	860 m	MPC · JPL
666618	2010 RT_{201}	—	September 3, 2010	Mount Lemmon	Mount Lemmon Survey	·	1.4 km	MPC · JPL
666619	2010 RD_{202}	—	December 23, 2017	Haleakala	Pan-STARRS 1	·	2.2 km	MPC · JPL
666620	2010 RJ_{204}	—	September 5, 2010	Mount Lemmon	Mount Lemmon Survey	·	940 m	MPC · JPL
666621	2010 RJ_{205}	—	September 15, 2010	Mount Lemmon	Mount Lemmon Survey	·	1.8 km	MPC · JPL
666622	2010 RG_{206}	—	September 11, 2010	Kitt Peak	Spacewatch	·	860 m	MPC · JPL
666623	2010 RJ_{207}	—	September 4, 2010	Kitt Peak	Spacewatch	MAS	660 m	MPC · JPL
666624	2010 RL_{207}	—	September 14, 2010	Mount Lemmon	Mount Lemmon Survey	·	970 m	MPC · JPL
666625	2010 RS_{209}	—	September 2, 2010	Mount Lemmon	Mount Lemmon Survey	·	2.2 km	MPC · JPL
666626	2010 RS_{213}	—	September 2, 2010	Mount Lemmon	Mount Lemmon Survey	·	2.2 km	MPC · JPL
666627	2010 RB_{215}	—	September 14, 2010	Kitt Peak	Spacewatch	·	1.1 km	MPC · JPL
666628	2010 RZ_{215}	—	September 4, 2010	Mount Lemmon	Mount Lemmon Survey	·	2.2 km	MPC · JPL
666629	2010 RG_{219}	—	September 11, 2010	Mount Lemmon	Mount Lemmon Survey	·	870 m	MPC · JPL
666630	2010 RU_{219}	—	September 9, 2010	Kitt Peak	Spacewatch	·	970 m	MPC · JPL
666631	2010 RB_{220}	—	September 5, 2010	Mount Lemmon	Mount Lemmon Survey	L4	7.1 km	MPC · JPL
666632	2010 RK_{222}	—	September 14, 2010	Mount Lemmon	Mount Lemmon Survey	·	2.3 km	MPC · JPL
666633	2010 RX_{222}	—	September 1, 2010	Mount Lemmon	Mount Lemmon Survey	VER	1.9 km	MPC · JPL
666634	2010 RJ_{226}	—	September 3, 2010	Haleakala	Pan-STARRS 1	centaur	60 km	MPC · JPL
666635	2010 SA_{1}	—	February 9, 2002	Kitt Peak	Spacewatch	·	3.3 km	MPC · JPL
666636	2010 SG_{4}	—	September 16, 2010	Kitt Peak	Spacewatch	·	750 m	MPC · JPL
666637	2010 SB_{9}	—	September 17, 2010	Mount Lemmon	Mount Lemmon Survey	·	2.1 km	MPC · JPL
666638	2010 SX_{13}	—	September 27, 2010	Kitt Peak	Spacewatch	·	2.2 km	MPC · JPL
666639	2010 SF_{16}	—	September 29, 2010	Mount Lemmon	Mount Lemmon Survey	·	2.7 km	MPC · JPL
666640	2010 SE_{21}	—	September 17, 2010	Kitt Peak	Spacewatch	·	2.4 km	MPC · JPL
666641	2010 SH_{24}	—	September 29, 2010	Mount Lemmon	Mount Lemmon Survey	·	2.2 km	MPC · JPL
666642	2010 SM_{24}	—	September 13, 2005	Kitt Peak	Spacewatch	·	1.6 km	MPC · JPL
666643	2010 ST_{26}	—	October 16, 2006	Kitt Peak	Spacewatch	·	700 m	MPC · JPL
666644	2010 SE_{27}	—	July 19, 2006	Mauna Kea	P. A. Wiegert, D. Subasinghe	MAS	590 m	MPC · JPL
666645	2010 SF_{27}	—	September 29, 2010	Kitt Peak	Spacewatch	·	2.0 km	MPC · JPL
666646	2010 SL_{27}	—	October 16, 1995	Kitt Peak	Spacewatch	·	900 m	MPC · JPL
666647	2010 SQ_{28}	—	September 18, 2010	Kitt Peak	Spacewatch	JUN	910 m	MPC · JPL
666648	2010 SJ_{31}	—	September 30, 2010	Mount Lemmon	Mount Lemmon Survey	·	2.5 km	MPC · JPL
666649	2010 SA_{36}	—	September 30, 2010	Piszkés-tető	K. Sárneczky, S. Kürti	·	2.1 km	MPC · JPL
666650	2010 SY_{37}	—	March 31, 2008	Mount Lemmon	Mount Lemmon Survey	·	2.0 km	MPC · JPL
666651	2010 SZ_{37}	—	September 30, 2010	Mount Lemmon	Mount Lemmon Survey	·	1.1 km	MPC · JPL
666652	2010 SM_{38}	—	October 7, 2005	Kitt Peak	Spacewatch	·	1.7 km	MPC · JPL
666653	2010 SX_{39}	—	March 11, 2007	Kitt Peak	Spacewatch	·	2.9 km	MPC · JPL
666654	2010 SY_{45}	—	September 18, 2010	Mount Lemmon	Mount Lemmon Survey	·	1.7 km	MPC · JPL
666655	2010 SQ_{46}	—	August 18, 2014	Haleakala	Pan-STARRS 1	·	1.3 km	MPC · JPL
666656	2010 SW_{46}	—	June 23, 2015	Haleakala	Pan-STARRS 1	·	2.2 km	MPC · JPL
666657	2010 SY_{46}	—	September 27, 2016	Mount Lemmon	Mount Lemmon Survey	EOS	1.6 km	MPC · JPL
666658	2010 SY_{47}	—	September 16, 2010	Mount Lemmon	Mount Lemmon Survey	·	980 m	MPC · JPL
666659	2010 SJ_{48}	—	October 7, 2016	Haleakala	Pan-STARRS 1	·	2.2 km	MPC · JPL
666660	2010 SX_{48}	—	October 23, 2016	Mount Lemmon	Mount Lemmon Survey	EOS	1.5 km	MPC · JPL
666661	2010 SZ_{52}	—	September 18, 2010	Mount Lemmon	Mount Lemmon Survey	·	990 m	MPC · JPL
666662	2010 SH_{53}	—	October 9, 2016	Mount Lemmon	Mount Lemmon Survey	VER	2.6 km	MPC · JPL
666663	2010 SP_{54}	—	September 29, 2010	Mount Lemmon	Mount Lemmon Survey	VER	2.3 km	MPC · JPL
666664	2010 SS_{55}	—	September 29, 2010	Mount Lemmon	Mount Lemmon Survey	·	2.3 km	MPC · JPL
666665	2010 SG_{57}	—	September 17, 2010	Mount Lemmon	Mount Lemmon Survey	·	1.9 km	MPC · JPL
666666	2010 SR_{59}	—	September 19, 2010	Kitt Peak	Spacewatch	EOS	1.6 km	MPC · JPL
666667	2010 SG_{60}	—	September 29, 2010	Mount Lemmon	Mount Lemmon Survey	·	2.3 km	MPC · JPL
666668	2010 SO_{60}	—	September 17, 2010	Mount Lemmon	Mount Lemmon Survey	·	2.2 km	MPC · JPL
666669	2010 SP_{66}	—	September 30, 2010	Mount Lemmon	Mount Lemmon Survey	·	1.9 km	MPC · JPL
666670	2010 TP_{4}	—	October 12, 1999	Kitt Peak	Spacewatch	THM	1.7 km	MPC · JPL
666671	2010 TP_{5}	—	September 4, 2010	Kitt Peak	Spacewatch	NYS	820 m	MPC · JPL
666672	2010 TA_{7}	—	September 8, 2010	Kitt Peak	Spacewatch	·	2.1 km	MPC · JPL
666673	2010 TJ_{7}	—	October 5, 2010	Siding Spring	SSS	AMO	410 m	MPC · JPL
666674	2010 TV_{7}	—	March 17, 2007	Anderson Mesa	LONEOS	·	2.5 km	MPC · JPL
666675	2010 TS_{10}	—	September 18, 2006	Kitt Peak	Spacewatch	·	1.5 km	MPC · JPL
666676	2010 TF_{11}	—	August 20, 2006	Palomar	NEAT	·	1.3 km	MPC · JPL
666677	2010 TS_{15}	—	February 14, 2002	Kitt Peak	Spacewatch	·	2.6 km	MPC · JPL
666678	2010 TN_{16}	—	October 3, 2010	Kitt Peak	Spacewatch	·	2.5 km	MPC · JPL
666679	2010 TU_{16}	—	March 10, 2002	Kitt Peak	Spacewatch	EOS	1.7 km	MPC · JPL
666680	2010 TK_{18}	—	September 15, 2010	Mount Lemmon	Mount Lemmon Survey	·	2.2 km	MPC · JPL
666681	2010 TQ_{21}	—	October 1, 2010	Kitt Peak	Spacewatch	·	2.4 km	MPC · JPL
666682	2010 TK_{35}	—	September 17, 2010	Kitt Peak	Spacewatch	MAS	610 m	MPC · JPL
666683	2010 TE_{38}	—	October 5, 2010	La Sagra	OAM	·	1.1 km	MPC · JPL
666684	2010 TV_{38}	—	October 7, 2010	Catalina	CSS	·	1.7 km	MPC · JPL
666685	2010 TY_{40}	—	September 8, 2010	Kitt Peak	Spacewatch	·	1.0 km	MPC · JPL
666686	2010 TR_{44}	—	October 28, 2005	Kitt Peak	Spacewatch	·	1.9 km	MPC · JPL
666687	2010 TD_{45}	—	October 1, 2005	Mount Lemmon	Mount Lemmon Survey	KOR	1.1 km	MPC · JPL
666688	2010 TR_{46}	—	July 26, 2003	Palomar	NEAT	PHO	750 m	MPC · JPL
666689	2010 TW_{51}	—	October 8, 2010	Kitt Peak	Spacewatch	EOS	1.5 km	MPC · JPL
666690	2010 TC_{57}	—	October 3, 2010	Kitt Peak	Spacewatch	·	760 m	MPC · JPL
666691	2010 TJ_{59}	—	October 7, 2010	Piszkés-tető	K. Sárneczky, Z. Kuli	·	2.6 km	MPC · JPL
666692	2010 TN_{61}	—	September 15, 2010	Mount Lemmon	Mount Lemmon Survey	ERI	1.1 km	MPC · JPL
666693	2010 TO_{61}	—	September 15, 2010	Mount Lemmon	Mount Lemmon Survey	·	2.1 km	MPC · JPL
666694	2010 TU_{62}	—	September 19, 2010	Kitt Peak	Spacewatch	·	2.7 km	MPC · JPL
666695	2010 TJ_{64}	—	October 7, 2010	Kitt Peak	Spacewatch	EUP	2.4 km	MPC · JPL
666696	2010 TL_{71}	—	September 18, 2010	Kitt Peak	Spacewatch	·	2.7 km	MPC · JPL
666697	2010 TP_{71}	—	September 9, 2010	Kitt Peak	Spacewatch	NYS	1.1 km	MPC · JPL
666698	2010 TO_{75}	—	March 21, 2009	Mount Lemmon	Mount Lemmon Survey	MAS	550 m	MPC · JPL
666699	2010 TO_{77}	—	March 5, 2008	Kitt Peak	Spacewatch	HYG	2.4 km	MPC · JPL
666700	2010 TK_{80}	—	September 1, 2010	Mount Lemmon	Mount Lemmon Survey	·	2.3 km	MPC · JPL

== 666701–666800 ==
back to top

Designation			Discovery			Properties		Ref
Permanent	Provisional	Named after	Date	Site	Discoverer(s)	Category	Diam.	Ref
666701	2010 TO_{80}	—	September 27, 2006	Mount Lemmon	Mount Lemmon Survey	·	820 m	MPC · JPL
666702	2010 TB_{83}	—	September 17, 2010	Mount Lemmon	Mount Lemmon Survey	·	2.7 km	MPC · JPL
666703	2010 TX_{83}	—	March 13, 2008	Kitt Peak	Spacewatch	KOR	1.2 km	MPC · JPL
666704	2010 TS_{88}	—	September 27, 2006	Kitt Peak	Spacewatch	·	740 m	MPC · JPL
666705	2010 TB_{91}	—	September 12, 2010	Kitt Peak	Spacewatch	·	850 m	MPC · JPL
666706	2010 TB_{94}	—	October 1, 2010	Mount Lemmon	Mount Lemmon Survey	HYG	2.1 km	MPC · JPL
666707	2010 TA_{98}	—	March 20, 2007	Mount Lemmon	Mount Lemmon Survey	·	2.4 km	MPC · JPL
666708	2010 TP_{103}	—	October 29, 2005	Kitt Peak	Spacewatch	·	2.5 km	MPC · JPL
666709	2010 TJ_{109}	—	October 2, 2006	Mount Lemmon	Mount Lemmon Survey	·	690 m	MPC · JPL
666710	2010 TA_{110}	—	October 9, 2010	Mount Lemmon	Mount Lemmon Survey	·	2.3 km	MPC · JPL
666711	2010 TX_{110}	—	July 11, 2010	WISE	WISE	·	1.6 km	MPC · JPL
666712	2010 TB_{121}	—	September 25, 2006	Mount Lemmon	Mount Lemmon Survey	·	680 m	MPC · JPL
666713	2010 TK_{121}	—	October 1, 2010	Mount Lemmon	Mount Lemmon Survey	H	450 m	MPC · JPL
666714	2010 TS_{122}	—	September 11, 2004	Kitt Peak	Spacewatch	·	2.3 km	MPC · JPL
666715	2010 TF_{125}	—	October 10, 2010	Mount Lemmon	Mount Lemmon Survey	·	770 m	MPC · JPL
666716	2010 TR_{130}	—	October 11, 2010	Mount Lemmon	Mount Lemmon Survey	·	2.0 km	MPC · JPL
666717	2010 TW_{131}	—	October 11, 2010	Kitt Peak	Spacewatch	EOS	1.6 km	MPC · JPL
666718	2010 TW_{132}	—	October 11, 2010	Mount Lemmon	Mount Lemmon Survey	(7605)	2.9 km	MPC · JPL
666719	2010 TG_{133}	—	October 11, 2010	Mount Lemmon	Mount Lemmon Survey	·	2.5 km	MPC · JPL
666720	2010 TZ_{134}	—	March 31, 2008	Mount Lemmon	Mount Lemmon Survey	·	2.5 km	MPC · JPL
666721	2010 TU_{136}	—	October 11, 2010	Mount Lemmon	Mount Lemmon Survey	·	2.3 km	MPC · JPL
666722	2010 TR_{138}	—	September 16, 2010	Mount Lemmon	Mount Lemmon Survey	·	2.6 km	MPC · JPL
666723	2010 TN_{141}	—	October 11, 2010	Mount Lemmon	Mount Lemmon Survey	·	2.7 km	MPC · JPL
666724	2010 TN_{143}	—	October 7, 2005	Mount Lemmon	Mount Lemmon Survey	·	2.2 km	MPC · JPL
666725	2010 TT_{146}	—	September 16, 2010	Mount Lemmon	Mount Lemmon Survey	·	2.3 km	MPC · JPL
666726	2010 TU_{146}	—	October 11, 2010	Mount Lemmon	Mount Lemmon Survey	·	1.9 km	MPC · JPL
666727	2010 TM_{148}	—	September 15, 2010	Mount Lemmon	Mount Lemmon Survey	·	930 m	MPC · JPL
666728	2010 TK_{149}	—	October 12, 2010	Mount Lemmon	Mount Lemmon Survey	·	2.9 km	MPC · JPL
666729	2010 TV_{149}	—	October 13, 2010	La Sagra	OAM	APO · PHA	640 m	MPC · JPL
666730	2010 TO_{152}	—	March 30, 2003	Kitt Peak	Deep Ecliptic Survey	·	2.5 km	MPC · JPL
666731	2010 TR_{158}	—	September 17, 2010	Kitt Peak	Spacewatch	MAS	570 m	MPC · JPL
666732	2010 TX_{158}	—	October 10, 2010	Kitt Peak	Spacewatch	BAR	740 m	MPC · JPL
666733	2010 TD_{160}	—	November 5, 1999	Kitt Peak	Spacewatch	·	2.7 km	MPC · JPL
666734	2010 TX_{163}	—	October 21, 1995	Kitt Peak	Spacewatch	NYS	1.0 km	MPC · JPL
666735	2010 TX_{169}	—	October 11, 2010	Vicques	M. Ory	·	850 m	MPC · JPL
666736	2010 TG_{177}	—	September 15, 2010	Kitt Peak	Spacewatch	·	1.1 km	MPC · JPL
666737	2010 TX_{179}	—	September 25, 2006	Kitt Peak	Spacewatch	·	810 m	MPC · JPL
666738	2010 TE_{180}	—	December 21, 2006	Kitt Peak	L. H. Wasserman, M. W. Buie	·	2.8 km	MPC · JPL
666739	2010 TS_{191}	—	October 7, 2010	Haleakala	Pan-STARRS 1	NT	135 km	MPC · JPL
666740	2010 TR_{194}	—	October 13, 2010	Mount Lemmon	Mount Lemmon Survey	·	2.5 km	MPC · JPL
666741	2010 TA_{196}	—	July 23, 2015	Haleakala	Pan-STARRS 1	·	3.0 km	MPC · JPL
666742	2010 TO_{196}	—	February 28, 2014	Haleakala	Pan-STARRS 1	·	2.3 km	MPC · JPL
666743	2010 TJ_{197}	—	May 6, 2014	Haleakala	Pan-STARRS 1	·	2.8 km	MPC · JPL
666744	2010 TT_{197}	—	May 16, 2013	Haleakala	Pan-STARRS 1	·	1.0 km	MPC · JPL
666745	2010 TV_{197}	—	December 25, 2011	Mount Lemmon	Mount Lemmon Survey	·	2.5 km	MPC · JPL
666746	2010 TM_{198}	—	October 9, 2010	Mount Lemmon	Mount Lemmon Survey	EOS	1.7 km	MPC · JPL
666747	2010 TB_{199}	—	October 1, 2010	Mount Lemmon	Mount Lemmon Survey	·	3.3 km	MPC · JPL
666748	2010 TE_{199}	—	October 11, 2010	Mount Lemmon	Mount Lemmon Survey	·	2.5 km	MPC · JPL
666749	2010 TJ_{199}	—	October 9, 2016	Mount Lemmon	Mount Lemmon Survey	·	2.5 km	MPC · JPL
666750	2010 TU_{200}	—	October 13, 2010	Mount Lemmon	Mount Lemmon Survey	TIR	2.0 km	MPC · JPL
666751	2010 TJ_{203}	—	October 10, 2010	Mount Lemmon	Mount Lemmon Survey	·	3.2 km	MPC · JPL
666752	2010 TU_{203}	—	July 4, 2010	Mount Lemmon	Mount Lemmon Survey	·	1.1 km	MPC · JPL
666753	2010 TX_{203}	—	March 15, 2013	Kitt Peak	Spacewatch	·	2.7 km	MPC · JPL
666754	2010 TT_{204}	—	October 11, 2010	Mount Lemmon	Mount Lemmon Survey	·	2.4 km	MPC · JPL
666755	2010 TD_{206}	—	January 12, 2018	Haleakala	Pan-STARRS 1	EOS	1.5 km	MPC · JPL
666756	2010 TJ_{207}	—	September 25, 2016	Mount Lemmon	Mount Lemmon Survey	·	2.6 km	MPC · JPL
666757	2010 TL_{210}	—	February 17, 2013	Kitt Peak	Spacewatch	·	2.4 km	MPC · JPL
666758	2010 TH_{211}	—	October 12, 2010	Mount Lemmon	Mount Lemmon Survey	·	870 m	MPC · JPL
666759	2010 TZ_{211}	—	October 3, 2010	Kitt Peak	Spacewatch	·	1.4 km	MPC · JPL
666760	2010 TF_{215}	—	October 13, 2010	Mount Lemmon	Mount Lemmon Survey	L4	7.7 km	MPC · JPL
666761	2010 TM_{215}	—	October 9, 2010	Mount Lemmon	Mount Lemmon Survey	·	3.4 km	MPC · JPL
666762	2010 TF_{217}	—	October 2, 2010	Mount Lemmon	Mount Lemmon Survey	·	1.1 km	MPC · JPL
666763	2010 TF_{225}	—	October 9, 2010	Catalina	CSS	·	870 m	MPC · JPL
666764	2010 TP_{225}	—	October 14, 2010	Mount Lemmon	Mount Lemmon Survey	NYS	950 m	MPC · JPL
666765	2010 TT_{225}	—	September 6, 1999	Kitt Peak	Spacewatch	MAS	560 m	MPC · JPL
666766	2010 TU_{227}	—	October 1, 2010	Mount Lemmon	Mount Lemmon Survey	·	2.3 km	MPC · JPL
666767	2010 TY_{228}	—	October 13, 2010	Mount Lemmon	Mount Lemmon Survey	·	2.3 km	MPC · JPL
666768	2010 TA_{241}	—	October 13, 2010	Mount Lemmon	Mount Lemmon Survey	L4	5.1 km	MPC · JPL
666769	2010 UJ_{4}	—	October 17, 2010	Mount Lemmon	Mount Lemmon Survey	·	2.3 km	MPC · JPL
666770	2010 UY_{8}	—	October 28, 2010	Kitt Peak	Spacewatch	·	2.6 km	MPC · JPL
666771	2010 UJ_{11}	—	September 29, 2010	Mount Lemmon	Mount Lemmon Survey	·	1 km	MPC · JPL
666772	2010 UF_{12}	—	October 12, 2010	Bergisch Gladbach	W. Bickel	·	3.4 km	MPC · JPL
666773	2010 UH_{15}	—	October 28, 2010	Catalina	CSS	·	980 m	MPC · JPL
666774	2010 UV_{22}	—	October 28, 2010	Mount Lemmon	Mount Lemmon Survey	·	3.7 km	MPC · JPL
666775	2010 UJ_{28}	—	January 18, 2004	Palomar	NEAT	·	960 m	MPC · JPL
666776	2010 UQ_{36}	—	October 29, 2010	Mount Lemmon	Mount Lemmon Survey	·	3.8 km	MPC · JPL
666777	2010 UE_{41}	—	October 11, 2010	Mount Lemmon	Mount Lemmon Survey	·	2.3 km	MPC · JPL
666778	2010 UX_{44}	—	October 27, 2006	Kitt Peak	Spacewatch	·	790 m	MPC · JPL
666779	2010 UE_{46}	—	October 11, 2010	Mount Lemmon	Mount Lemmon Survey	·	3.0 km	MPC · JPL
666780	2010 UW_{52}	—	November 17, 2006	Kitt Peak	Spacewatch	·	920 m	MPC · JPL
666781	2010 UH_{56}	—	October 29, 2010	Kitt Peak	Spacewatch	·	1.3 km	MPC · JPL
666782	2010 UE_{58}	—	October 14, 2010	Mount Lemmon	Mount Lemmon Survey	·	2.9 km	MPC · JPL
666783	2010 UZ_{58}	—	November 7, 2002	Apache Point	SDSS Collaboration	·	1.1 km	MPC · JPL
666784	2010 UK_{59}	—	October 29, 2010	Kitt Peak	Spacewatch	·	1.6 km	MPC · JPL
666785	2010 UC_{63}	—	September 16, 2010	Mount Lemmon	Mount Lemmon Survey	·	940 m	MPC · JPL
666786	2010 UV_{64}	—	October 31, 2010	ESA OGS	ESA OGS	·	2.8 km	MPC · JPL
666787	2010 UT_{66}	—	October 31, 2010	Calvin-Rehoboth	L. A. Molnar	·	2.9 km	MPC · JPL
666788	2010 UL_{67}	—	March 4, 2008	Kitt Peak	Spacewatch	·	1.9 km	MPC · JPL
666789	2010 UM_{68}	—	October 31, 2010	Piszkéstető	K. Sárneczky, Z. Kuli	·	2.1 km	MPC · JPL
666790	2010 UZ_{68}	—	October 29, 2005	Mount Lemmon	Mount Lemmon Survey	·	2.5 km	MPC · JPL
666791	2010 UU_{73}	—	October 29, 2005	Mount Lemmon	Mount Lemmon Survey	·	1.5 km	MPC · JPL
666792	2010 UR_{74}	—	August 30, 2005	Campo Imperatore	CINEOS	·	2.4 km	MPC · JPL
666793	2010 UF_{79}	—	October 19, 2006	Lulin	LUSS	·	960 m	MPC · JPL
666794	2010 UL_{82}	—	October 12, 2010	Mount Lemmon	Mount Lemmon Survey	MAS	650 m	MPC · JPL
666795	2010 UB_{86}	—	April 13, 2008	Kitt Peak	Spacewatch	·	1.5 km	MPC · JPL
666796	2010 UU_{90}	—	October 31, 2010	Mount Lemmon	Mount Lemmon Survey	·	740 m	MPC · JPL
666797	2010 UG_{91}	—	December 20, 2007	Kitt Peak	Spacewatch	·	740 m	MPC · JPL
666798	2010 UR_{93}	—	October 13, 2010	Mount Lemmon	Mount Lemmon Survey	·	980 m	MPC · JPL
666799	2010 UK_{97}	—	October 28, 2010	Mount Lemmon	Mount Lemmon Survey	L4	6.8 km	MPC · JPL
666800	2010 UU_{100}	—	September 3, 2010	Mount Lemmon	Mount Lemmon Survey	·	1.6 km	MPC · JPL

== 666801–666900 ==
back to top

Designation			Discovery			Properties		Ref
Permanent	Provisional	Named after	Date	Site	Discoverer(s)	Category	Diam.	Ref
666801	2010 UA_{105}	—	October 29, 2010	Mauna Kea	George, T., M. Micheli	·	1 km	MPC · JPL
666802	2010 UU_{110}	—	October 31, 2010	Haleakala	Pan-STARRS 1	centaur	113 km	MPC · JPL
666803	2010 UY_{110}	—	October 7, 2016	Haleakala	Pan-STARRS 1	URS	2.8 km	MPC · JPL
666804	2010 UC_{111}	—	October 17, 2010	Mount Lemmon	Mount Lemmon Survey	·	2.4 km	MPC · JPL
666805	2010 UD_{111}	—	October 28, 2010	Mount Lemmon	Mount Lemmon Survey	·	2.7 km	MPC · JPL
666806	2010 UU_{111}	—	October 28, 2010	Mount Lemmon	Mount Lemmon Survey	·	1.2 km	MPC · JPL
666807	2010 UX_{111}	—	October 28, 2010	Catalina	CSS	·	1.0 km	MPC · JPL
666808	2010 UH_{112}	—	October 31, 2010	Mount Lemmon	Mount Lemmon Survey	TIR	3.1 km	MPC · JPL
666809	2010 UT_{112}	—	August 9, 2015	Haleakala	Pan-STARRS 1	·	2.7 km	MPC · JPL
666810	2010 UX_{113}	—	October 30, 2010	Mount Lemmon	Mount Lemmon Survey	·	930 m	MPC · JPL
666811	2010 UG_{116}	—	October 29, 2010	Catalina	CSS	·	1.1 km	MPC · JPL
666812	2010 UA_{117}	—	October 31, 2010	Mount Lemmon	Mount Lemmon Survey	·	1.7 km	MPC · JPL
666813	2010 UL_{117}	—	October 29, 2010	Mount Lemmon	Mount Lemmon Survey	·	2.4 km	MPC · JPL
666814	2010 UN_{117}	—	October 29, 2016	Kitt Peak	Spacewatch	·	2.6 km	MPC · JPL
666815	2010 UP_{121}	—	October 28, 2010	Mount Lemmon	Mount Lemmon Survey	H	420 m	MPC · JPL
666816	2010 UC_{127}	—	October 30, 2010	Mount Lemmon	Mount Lemmon Survey	·	2.3 km	MPC · JPL
666817	2010 UM_{127}	—	October 17, 2010	Mount Lemmon	Mount Lemmon Survey	·	2.3 km	MPC · JPL
666818	2010 UR_{130}	—	October 29, 2010	Mount Lemmon	Mount Lemmon Survey	L4	6.7 km	MPC · JPL
666819	2010 VQ_{1}	—	October 17, 2010	Mount Lemmon	Mount Lemmon Survey	·	1.6 km	MPC · JPL
666820	2010 VK_{4}	—	October 2, 2010	Mount Lemmon	Mount Lemmon Survey	·	2.3 km	MPC · JPL
666821	2010 VF_{8}	—	November 1, 2010	Mount Lemmon	Mount Lemmon Survey	·	2.4 km	MPC · JPL
666822	2010 VM_{10}	—	November 1, 2010	Mount Lemmon	Mount Lemmon Survey	MAR	720 m	MPC · JPL
666823	2010 VR_{11}	—	November 2, 2010	La Silla	La Silla	cubewano (hot)	349 km	MPC · JPL
666824	2010 VH_{12}	—	November 1, 2010	Kitt Peak	Spacewatch	·	1.1 km	MPC · JPL
666825	2010 VG_{13}	—	November 1, 2010	Mount Lemmon	Mount Lemmon Survey	JUN	890 m	MPC · JPL
666826	2010 VX_{14}	—	December 21, 2006	Kitt Peak	Spacewatch	·	800 m	MPC · JPL
666827	2010 VT_{16}	—	October 17, 2010	Mount Lemmon	Mount Lemmon Survey	·	2.4 km	MPC · JPL
666828	2010 VN_{17}	—	September 18, 2006	Catalina	CSS	·	1.6 km	MPC · JPL
666829	2010 VO_{18}	—	November 2, 2010	Mount Lemmon	Mount Lemmon Survey	·	1.1 km	MPC · JPL
666830	2010 VZ_{18}	—	November 2, 2010	Mount Lemmon	Mount Lemmon Survey	·	2.0 km	MPC · JPL
666831	2010 VH_{20}	—	November 2, 2010	Mount Lemmon	Mount Lemmon Survey	·	2.1 km	MPC · JPL
666832	2010 VU_{20}	—	September 3, 2010	Mount Lemmon	Mount Lemmon Survey	·	930 m	MPC · JPL
666833	2010 VZ_{23}	—	September 18, 2010	Mount Lemmon	Mount Lemmon Survey	THM	2.0 km	MPC · JPL
666834	2010 VK_{26}	—	November 1, 2010	Kitt Peak	Spacewatch	·	900 m	MPC · JPL
666835	2010 VX_{26}	—	November 1, 2010	Kitt Peak	Spacewatch	(1547)	1.5 km	MPC · JPL
666836	2010 VC_{28}	—	April 4, 2005	Mount Lemmon	Mount Lemmon Survey	·	1.1 km	MPC · JPL
666837	2010 VE_{32}	—	September 11, 2010	Mount Lemmon	Mount Lemmon Survey	·	2.4 km	MPC · JPL
666838	2010 VE_{33}	—	November 3, 2010	Mount Lemmon	Mount Lemmon Survey	·	1.3 km	MPC · JPL
666839	2010 VM_{37}	—	October 12, 2010	Mount Lemmon	Mount Lemmon Survey	·	1.1 km	MPC · JPL
666840	2010 VQ_{48}	—	November 2, 2010	Kitt Peak	Spacewatch	·	3.4 km	MPC · JPL
666841	2010 VA_{49}	—	November 3, 2010	Kitt Peak	Spacewatch	·	910 m	MPC · JPL
666842	2010 VL_{49}	—	November 3, 2010	Kitt Peak	Spacewatch	VER	2.3 km	MPC · JPL
666843	2010 VM_{49}	—	August 15, 2006	Palomar	NEAT	·	1.2 km	MPC · JPL
666844	2010 VC_{52}	—	November 3, 2010	Mount Lemmon	Mount Lemmon Survey	L4	7.2 km	MPC · JPL
666845	2010 VR_{54}	—	September 14, 2006	Kitt Peak	Spacewatch	·	1.5 km	MPC · JPL
666846	2010 VG_{59}	—	October 13, 2010	Mount Lemmon	Mount Lemmon Survey	·	2.3 km	MPC · JPL
666847	2010 VY_{61}	—	July 14, 2001	Palomar	NEAT	·	1.4 km	MPC · JPL
666848	2010 VD_{67}	—	November 4, 2005	Mount Lemmon	Mount Lemmon Survey	·	2.7 km	MPC · JPL
666849	2010 VJ_{67}	—	December 7, 2005	Kitt Peak	Spacewatch	·	2.2 km	MPC · JPL
666850	2010 VC_{68}	—	October 20, 1999	Kitt Peak	Spacewatch	THM	2.0 km	MPC · JPL
666851	2010 VP_{68}	—	September 17, 2010	Mount Lemmon	Mount Lemmon Survey	·	2.5 km	MPC · JPL
666852	2010 VK_{70}	—	November 5, 2010	Kitt Peak	Spacewatch	GEF	1.4 km	MPC · JPL
666853	2010 VZ_{79}	—	October 10, 1996	Kitt Peak	Spacewatch	·	1.9 km	MPC · JPL
666854	2010 VH_{83}	—	January 30, 2003	Mount Graham	Ryan, W.	·	720 m	MPC · JPL
666855	2010 VC_{86}	—	October 14, 2010	Mount Lemmon	Mount Lemmon Survey	·	1.0 km	MPC · JPL
666856	2010 VU_{88}	—	November 26, 2005	Mount Lemmon	Mount Lemmon Survey	·	1.4 km	MPC · JPL
666857	2010 VL_{89}	—	September 10, 2004	Kitt Peak	Spacewatch	·	2.0 km	MPC · JPL
666858	2010 VR_{92}	—	October 31, 2010	Mount Lemmon	Mount Lemmon Survey	·	1.5 km	MPC · JPL
666859	2010 VD_{94}	—	October 19, 2010	Mount Lemmon	Mount Lemmon Survey	·	870 m	MPC · JPL
666860	2010 VV_{103}	—	September 8, 2004	Palomar	NEAT	THB	2.2 km	MPC · JPL
666861	2010 VZ_{103}	—	November 5, 2010	Kitt Peak	Spacewatch	V	500 m	MPC · JPL
666862	2010 VR_{106}	—	October 15, 2010	Sandlot	G. Hug	·	850 m	MPC · JPL
666863	2010 VD_{111}	—	November 6, 2010	Mount Lemmon	Mount Lemmon Survey	·	2.1 km	MPC · JPL
666864	2010 VL_{113}	—	October 30, 2010	Kitt Peak	Spacewatch	·	850 m	MPC · JPL
666865	2010 VG_{121}	—	November 20, 2006	Kitt Peak	Spacewatch	·	1.0 km	MPC · JPL
666866	2010 VN_{122}	—	November 8, 2010	Mount Lemmon	Mount Lemmon Survey	L4	9.3 km	MPC · JPL
666867	2010 VC_{126}	—	November 8, 2010	Mount Lemmon	Mount Lemmon Survey	·	2.5 km	MPC · JPL
666868	2010 VU_{127}	—	July 30, 2000	Cerro Tololo	Deep Ecliptic Survey	·	1.2 km	MPC · JPL
666869	2010 VL_{129}	—	November 9, 2010	Catalina	CSS	·	2.4 km	MPC · JPL
666870	2010 VS_{135}	—	November 10, 2010	Mount Lemmon	Mount Lemmon Survey	·	2.1 km	MPC · JPL
666871	2010 VM_{137}	—	November 5, 2010	Mount Lemmon	Mount Lemmon Survey	·	1.0 km	MPC · JPL
666872	2010 VE_{138}	—	November 11, 2010	Kitt Peak	Spacewatch	·	1.1 km	MPC · JPL
666873	2010 VT_{146}	—	November 6, 2010	Mount Lemmon	Mount Lemmon Survey	(5)	950 m	MPC · JPL
666874	2010 VV_{148}	—	November 6, 2010	Mount Lemmon	Mount Lemmon Survey	L4	6.3 km	MPC · JPL
666875	2010 VA_{152}	—	November 6, 2010	Socorro	LINEAR	·	1.4 km	MPC · JPL
666876	2010 VS_{157}	—	October 29, 2010	Mount Lemmon	Mount Lemmon Survey	L4	6.2 km	MPC · JPL
666877	2010 VW_{161}	—	November 2, 2010	Kitt Peak	Spacewatch	·	2.7 km	MPC · JPL
666878	2010 VC_{163}	—	November 10, 2010	Kitt Peak	Spacewatch	·	2.7 km	MPC · JPL
666879	2010 VZ_{168}	—	November 10, 2010	Mount Lemmon	Mount Lemmon Survey	L4	6.4 km	MPC · JPL
666880	2010 VC_{169}	—	November 10, 2010	Mount Lemmon	Mount Lemmon Survey	·	3.1 km	MPC · JPL
666881	2010 VT_{170}	—	November 10, 2010	Mount Lemmon	Mount Lemmon Survey	L4	6.5 km	MPC · JPL
666882	2010 VC_{172}	—	November 10, 2010	Mount Lemmon	Mount Lemmon Survey	·	510 m	MPC · JPL
666883	2010 VS_{175}	—	November 11, 2010	Kitt Peak	Spacewatch	LIX	3.2 km	MPC · JPL
666884	2010 VW_{175}	—	January 5, 2006	Mount Lemmon	Mount Lemmon Survey	·	1.2 km	MPC · JPL
666885	2010 VA_{176}	—	October 8, 2004	Anderson Mesa	LONEOS	·	2.8 km	MPC · JPL
666886	2010 VD_{188}	—	November 13, 2010	Mount Lemmon	Mount Lemmon Survey	·	3.0 km	MPC · JPL
666887	2010 VT_{189}	—	November 13, 2010	Mount Lemmon	Mount Lemmon Survey	·	2.5 km	MPC · JPL
666888	2010 VN_{192}	—	November 11, 2010	Catalina	CSS	·	1.1 km	MPC · JPL
666889	2010 VZ_{197}	—	November 1, 2010	Piszkés-tető	K. Sárneczky, Z. Kuli	·	1.1 km	MPC · JPL
666890	2010 VF_{200}	—	May 16, 2009	Kitt Peak	Spacewatch	·	1.8 km	MPC · JPL
666891	2010 VR_{200}	—	November 13, 2010	Mount Lemmon	Mount Lemmon Survey	·	3.2 km	MPC · JPL
666892	2010 VY_{200}	—	November 15, 2010	Catalina	CSS	·	2.4 km	MPC · JPL
666893	2010 VO_{205}	—	November 2, 2010	Mount Lemmon	Mount Lemmon Survey	·	2.8 km	MPC · JPL
666894	2010 VY_{207}	—	October 11, 2010	Mount Lemmon	Mount Lemmon Survey	·	2.1 km	MPC · JPL
666895	2010 VV_{209}	—	November 2, 2010	Mount Lemmon	Mount Lemmon Survey	·	3.0 km	MPC · JPL
666896	2010 VG_{211}	—	January 12, 2002	Kitt Peak	Spacewatch	KOR	1.1 km	MPC · JPL
666897	2010 VU_{211}	—	September 30, 2010	Mount Lemmon	Mount Lemmon Survey	·	2.6 km	MPC · JPL
666898	2010 VA_{216}	—	November 11, 2010	Mount Lemmon	Mount Lemmon Survey	·	1.3 km	MPC · JPL
666899	2010 VO_{216}	—	May 1, 2009	Cerro Burek	Burek, Cerro	·	3.1 km	MPC · JPL
666900	2010 VJ_{217}	—	September 3, 2010	Mount Lemmon	Mount Lemmon Survey	JUN	630 m	MPC · JPL

== 666901–667000 ==
back to top

Designation			Discovery			Properties		Ref
Permanent	Provisional	Named after	Date	Site	Discoverer(s)	Category	Diam.	Ref
666901	2010 VP_{218}	—	October 30, 2010	Piszkés-tető	K. Sárneczky, Z. Kuli	·	2.8 km	MPC · JPL
666902	2010 VX_{224}	—	November 10, 2010	Haleakala	Pan-STARRS 1	other TNO	199 km	MPC · JPL
666903	2010 VR_{225}	—	November 7, 2010	Mount Lemmon	Mount Lemmon Survey	·	1.1 km	MPC · JPL
666904	2010 VR_{228}	—	November 3, 2010	Kitt Peak	Spacewatch	·	3.1 km	MPC · JPL
666905	2010 VD_{229}	—	November 15, 2010	Charleston	R. Holmes	·	1.1 km	MPC · JPL
666906	2010 VT_{229}	—	November 1, 2010	Mount Lemmon	Mount Lemmon Survey	·	2.8 km	MPC · JPL
666907	2010 VU_{229}	—	August 9, 2015	Haleakala	Pan-STARRS 1	·	2.5 km	MPC · JPL
666908	2010 VX_{229}	—	November 12, 2010	Mount Lemmon	Mount Lemmon Survey	·	1.0 km	MPC · JPL
666909	2010 VB_{230}	—	October 26, 2016	Mount Lemmon	Mount Lemmon Survey	·	2.6 km	MPC · JPL
666910	2010 VE_{232}	—	November 14, 2010	Vail-Jarnac	Glinos, T.	·	3.3 km	MPC · JPL
666911	2010 VK_{236}	—	November 14, 2010	Mount Lemmon	Mount Lemmon Survey	·	2.3 km	MPC · JPL
666912	2010 VB_{237}	—	November 13, 2010	Mount Lemmon	Mount Lemmon Survey	·	880 m	MPC · JPL
666913	2010 VU_{237}	—	November 11, 2010	Mount Lemmon	Mount Lemmon Survey	L4	4.8 km	MPC · JPL
666914	2010 VZ_{241}	—	March 8, 2013	Haleakala	Pan-STARRS 1	·	2.5 km	MPC · JPL
666915	2010 VG_{244}	—	September 9, 2015	Haleakala	Pan-STARRS 1	·	2.3 km	MPC · JPL
666916	2010 VX_{245}	—	November 13, 2010	Mount Lemmon	Mount Lemmon Survey	L4	6.5 km	MPC · JPL
666917	2010 VA_{246}	—	November 5, 2010	Kitt Peak	Spacewatch	L4	7.3 km	MPC · JPL
666918	2010 VC_{246}	—	November 1, 2010	Mount Lemmon	Mount Lemmon Survey	·	3.2 km	MPC · JPL
666919	2010 VS_{247}	—	January 18, 2012	Kitt Peak	Spacewatch	·	2.2 km	MPC · JPL
666920	2010 VW_{250}	—	November 14, 2010	Mount Lemmon	Mount Lemmon Survey	VER	2.0 km	MPC · JPL
666921	2010 VY_{251}	—	November 1, 2010	Mount Lemmon	Mount Lemmon Survey	MAS	610 m	MPC · JPL
666922	2010 VZ_{253}	—	November 7, 2010	Kitt Peak	Spacewatch	·	2.9 km	MPC · JPL
666923	2010 VU_{254}	—	November 5, 2010	Mount Lemmon	Mount Lemmon Survey	·	4.0 km	MPC · JPL
666924	2010 VD_{256}	—	November 5, 2010	Mount Lemmon	Mount Lemmon Survey	·	2.4 km	MPC · JPL
666925	2010 VE_{256}	—	November 15, 2010	Mount Lemmon	Mount Lemmon Survey	H	450 m	MPC · JPL
666926	2010 VD_{257}	—	November 12, 2010	Mount Lemmon	Mount Lemmon Survey	L4	6.6 km	MPC · JPL
666927	2010 VD_{263}	—	November 6, 2010	Mount Lemmon	Mount Lemmon Survey	L4	5.7 km	MPC · JPL
666928	2010 VK_{264}	—	November 13, 2010	Mount Lemmon	Mount Lemmon Survey	·	3.0 km	MPC · JPL
666929	2010 VQ_{266}	—	November 15, 2010	Mount Lemmon	Mount Lemmon Survey	·	3.0 km	MPC · JPL
666930	2010 VQ_{269}	—	November 4, 2010	Mount Lemmon	Mount Lemmon Survey	·	2.4 km	MPC · JPL
666931	2010 VY_{270}	—	November 1, 2010	Mount Lemmon	Mount Lemmon Survey	VER	2.0 km	MPC · JPL
666932	2010 VZ_{272}	—	November 11, 2010	Mount Lemmon	Mount Lemmon Survey	·	2.2 km	MPC · JPL
666933	2010 VG_{274}	—	November 3, 2010	Kitt Peak	Spacewatch	·	2.8 km	MPC · JPL
666934	2010 VQ_{276}	—	November 8, 2010	Mount Lemmon	Mount Lemmon Survey	·	2.7 km	MPC · JPL
666935	2010 WF_{2}	—	December 14, 2006	Mount Lemmon	Mount Lemmon Survey	RAF	640 m	MPC · JPL
666936	2010 WD_{5}	—	November 27, 2010	Mount Lemmon	Mount Lemmon Survey	·	1.0 km	MPC · JPL
666937	2010 WT_{5}	—	November 27, 2010	Mount Lemmon	Mount Lemmon Survey	(5)	910 m	MPC · JPL
666938	2010 WA_{6}	—	November 27, 2010	Mount Lemmon	Mount Lemmon Survey	L4	6.3 km	MPC · JPL
666939	2010 WM_{9}	—	October 30, 2010	Mount Lemmon	Mount Lemmon Survey	·	2.7 km	MPC · JPL
666940	2010 WS_{10}	—	October 30, 2010	Kitt Peak	Spacewatch	(5)	730 m	MPC · JPL
666941	2010 WU_{18}	—	November 6, 2010	Kitt Peak	Spacewatch	·	730 m	MPC · JPL
666942	2010 WW_{21}	—	October 28, 2006	Mount Lemmon	Mount Lemmon Survey	·	1.1 km	MPC · JPL
666943	2010 WM_{23}	—	October 2, 2006	Mount Lemmon	Mount Lemmon Survey	·	1.3 km	MPC · JPL
666944	2010 WV_{23}	—	November 10, 2010	Kitt Peak	Spacewatch	·	2.3 km	MPC · JPL
666945	2010 WS_{24}	—	October 20, 2006	Mount Lemmon	Mount Lemmon Survey	·	810 m	MPC · JPL
666946	2010 WT_{27}	—	November 6, 2010	Kitt Peak	Spacewatch	·	2.6 km	MPC · JPL
666947	2010 WU_{29}	—	November 27, 2010	Mount Lemmon	Mount Lemmon Survey	·	390 m	MPC · JPL
666948	2010 WV_{29}	—	May 10, 2005	Kitt Peak	Spacewatch	NYS	1.2 km	MPC · JPL
666949	2010 WD_{31}	—	November 13, 2010	Kitt Peak	Spacewatch	·	2.7 km	MPC · JPL
666950	2010 WJ_{31}	—	November 13, 2010	Kitt Peak	Spacewatch	·	950 m	MPC · JPL
666951	2010 WJ_{32}	—	November 27, 2010	Mount Lemmon	Mount Lemmon Survey	·	1.1 km	MPC · JPL
666952	2010 WL_{32}	—	November 27, 2010	Mount Lemmon	Mount Lemmon Survey	·	2.5 km	MPC · JPL
666953	2010 WV_{36}	—	November 27, 2010	Mount Lemmon	Mount Lemmon Survey	·	970 m	MPC · JPL
666954	2010 WS_{39}	—	November 27, 2010	Mount Lemmon	Mount Lemmon Survey	·	810 m	MPC · JPL
666955	2010 WO_{40}	—	November 27, 2010	Mount Lemmon	Mount Lemmon Survey	·	1.1 km	MPC · JPL
666956	2010 WW_{40}	—	October 29, 2010	Kitt Peak	Spacewatch	·	2.6 km	MPC · JPL
666957	2010 WQ_{49}	—	October 14, 2010	Mount Lemmon	Mount Lemmon Survey	·	970 m	MPC · JPL
666958	2010 WA_{52}	—	November 2, 2010	Kitt Peak	Spacewatch	·	1.3 km	MPC · JPL
666959	2010 WO_{56}	—	December 14, 2006	Kitt Peak	Spacewatch	·	890 m	MPC · JPL
666960	2010 WQ_{63}	—	April 29, 2008	Mount Lemmon	Mount Lemmon Survey	·	950 m	MPC · JPL
666961	2010 WB_{68}	—	November 1, 2010	Kitt Peak	Spacewatch	·	3.9 km	MPC · JPL
666962	2010 WZ_{73}	—	November 16, 2010	Catalina	CSS	T_{j} (2.98)	3.2 km	MPC · JPL
666963	2010 WE_{74}	—	November 27, 2010	Mount Lemmon	Mount Lemmon Survey	·	970 m	MPC · JPL
666964	2010 WF_{76}	—	November 30, 2010	Catalina	CSS	·	1.1 km	MPC · JPL
666965	2010 WW_{79}	—	November 16, 2010	Mount Lemmon	Mount Lemmon Survey	EUN	1.0 km	MPC · JPL
666966	2010 XD_{11}	—	December 3, 2010	Mount Lemmon	Mount Lemmon Survey	APO +1km	910 m	MPC · JPL
666967	2010 XL_{13}	—	November 12, 2010	Mount Lemmon	Mount Lemmon Survey	T_{j} (2.92)	4.6 km	MPC · JPL
666968	2010 XM_{17}	—	November 2, 2010	Kitt Peak	Spacewatch	·	2.5 km	MPC · JPL
666969	2010 XC_{19}	—	December 4, 2010	Mount Lemmon	Mount Lemmon Survey	·	1.0 km	MPC · JPL
666970	2010 XZ_{20}	—	November 12, 2010	Mount Lemmon	Mount Lemmon Survey	(5)	830 m	MPC · JPL
666971	2010 XV_{23}	—	November 13, 2010	Mount Lemmon	Mount Lemmon Survey	·	1.3 km	MPC · JPL
666972	2010 XD_{24}	—	November 8, 2010	Kitt Peak	Spacewatch	·	1.5 km	MPC · JPL
666973	2010 XX_{26}	—	September 27, 2009	Kitt Peak	Spacewatch	L4	6.7 km	MPC · JPL
666974	2010 XV_{35}	—	December 3, 2010	Mount Lemmon	Mount Lemmon Survey	·	860 m	MPC · JPL
666975	2010 XJ_{40}	—	November 15, 2010	Catalina	CSS	·	1.3 km	MPC · JPL
666976	2010 XQ_{47}	—	December 25, 2005	Mount Lemmon	Mount Lemmon Survey	THM	2.1 km	MPC · JPL
666977	2010 XT_{48}	—	September 11, 2010	Kitt Peak	Spacewatch	·	2.6 km	MPC · JPL
666978	2010 XO_{49}	—	November 22, 2006	Mount Lemmon	Mount Lemmon Survey	·	1.0 km	MPC · JPL
666979	2010 XU_{51}	—	December 10, 2010	Kitt Peak	Spacewatch	T_{j} (2.94)	3.4 km	MPC · JPL
666980	2010 XZ_{51}	—	December 2, 2010	Mount Lemmon	Mount Lemmon Survey	·	1.4 km	MPC · JPL
666981	2010 XT_{56}	—	December 2, 2010	Catalina	CSS	H	500 m	MPC · JPL
666982	2010 XN_{60}	—	February 17, 2004	Kitt Peak	Spacewatch	·	1.3 km	MPC · JPL
666983	2010 XD_{69}	—	December 6, 2010	Mount Lemmon	Mount Lemmon Survey	HNS	1.2 km	MPC · JPL
666984	2010 XY_{69}	—	December 13, 2010	Mayhill-ISON	L. Elenin	H	540 m	MPC · JPL
666985	2010 XC_{72}	—	December 14, 2010	Mount Lemmon	Mount Lemmon Survey	TIR	3.0 km	MPC · JPL
666986	2010 XK_{80}	—	December 6, 2010	Mount Lemmon	Mount Lemmon Survey	H	510 m	MPC · JPL
666987	2010 XM_{80}	—	November 6, 2010	Mount Lemmon	Mount Lemmon Survey	·	1.7 km	MPC · JPL
666988	2010 XS_{83}	—	November 12, 2010	Kitt Peak	Spacewatch	·	960 m	MPC · JPL
666989	2010 XF_{84}	—	November 14, 2010	Vail-Jarnac	Glinos, T.	·	970 m	MPC · JPL
666990	2010 XU_{85}	—	November 6, 2010	Mount Lemmon	Mount Lemmon Survey	·	950 m	MPC · JPL
666991	2010 XX_{91}	—	December 14, 2010	Mount Lemmon	Mount Lemmon Survey	·	870 m	MPC · JPL
666992	2010 XU_{94}	—	September 4, 2014	Haleakala	Pan-STARRS 1	EOS	1.7 km	MPC · JPL
666993	2010 XF_{95}	—	June 4, 2013	Mount Lemmon	Mount Lemmon Survey	·	3.1 km	MPC · JPL
666994	2010 XZ_{95}	—	April 16, 2012	Haleakala	Pan-STARRS 1	·	640 m	MPC · JPL
666995	2010 XL_{100}	—	December 14, 2010	Mount Lemmon	Mount Lemmon Survey	·	840 m	MPC · JPL
666996	2010 XV_{100}	—	December 5, 2010	Mount Lemmon	Mount Lemmon Survey	·	1.3 km	MPC · JPL
666997	2010 XZ_{100}	—	December 11, 2010	Mount Lemmon	Mount Lemmon Survey	·	1.0 km	MPC · JPL
666998	2010 XH_{101}	—	December 15, 2010	Mount Lemmon	Mount Lemmon Survey	·	860 m	MPC · JPL
666999	2010 XF_{102}	—	December 8, 2010	Mount Lemmon	Mount Lemmon Survey	·	1.2 km	MPC · JPL
667000	2010 XM_{102}	—	November 22, 2014	Haleakala	Pan-STARRS 1	·	1.0 km	MPC · JPL

back to top

== Meaning of names ==
As minor planet discoveries are confirmed, they are given a permanent number by the IAU's Minor Planet Center (MPC), and the discoverers can then submit names for them, following the IAU's naming conventions. The list below concerns those minor planets in the specified number-range that have received names, and explains the meanings of those names.

Official naming citations of newly named small Solar System bodies are approved and published in a bulletin by IAU's Working Group for Small Bodies Nomenclature (WGSBN). Before May 2021, citations were published in MPC's Minor Planet Circulars for many decades. Recent citations can also be found on the JPL Small-Body Database (SBDB). Until his death in 2016, German astronomer Lutz D. Schmadel compiled these citations into the Dictionary of Minor Planet Names (DMP) and regularly updated the collection.

Based on Paul Herget's The Names of the Minor Planets, Schmadel also researched the unclear origin of numerous asteroids, most of which had been named prior to World War II. This article incorporates text from this source, which is in the public domain: SBDB New namings may only be added to this list below after official publication as the preannouncement of names is condemned. The WGSBN publishes a comprehensive guideline for the naming rules of non-cometary small Solar System bodies.

Named minor planet	Provisional	This minor planet was named for...	Ref · Catalog
666312 Aroneisenberg	2010 DS_{9}	Aron Eisenberg, American actor and podcaster, best known for his role as Nog on the television series Star Trek: Deep Space Nine.	IAU · 666312
666479 Maratmingaliev	2010 MF_{132}	Marat Mingaliev, Russian astronomer.	IAU · 666479
