= Star Trek: Deep Space Nine: Dominion Wars =

2001 video game

- Developer: Gizmo Industries
- Publisher: Simon & Schuster
- Director: Gary Wagner
- Producer: Gary Wagner
- Designers: Chris Bernert; Christoph Klug
- Programmer: Gary Vick
- Artist: Rodney Walden
- Composer: Scott Roewe
- Series: Star Trek
- Platform: Microsoft Windows
- Release: NA: June 12, 2001; UK: August 17, 2001
- Genres: Real-time tactics, space combat
- Modes: Single-player, multiplayer

Star Trek: Deep Space Nine: Dominion Wars is a 2001 space combat/real-time tactics video game for Microsoft Windows developed by Gizmo Industries and published by Simon & Schuster. The game is based on the Star Trek TV show Star Trek: Deep Space Nine.

== Gameplay ==
=== Single-player ===
Gameplay in Dominion Wars. The player is currently controlling several Dominion and Cardassian ships attacking a Federation ship.

Gameplay is a mix between real-time tactics and space combat simulation. The game allows simultaneous control of up to six different ships from any of the four main combatant powers in the Dominion War - the Federation, the Klingons, the Cardassians and the Dominion. Missions include both primary and secondary objectives that allow a multitude of solutions for completion. To this end, before most missions, player may choose their ships, captains and accessories from a range of available personnel and ship classes.

Completing each mission earns the player credits, which can be used between missions to purchase new ships, more experienced captains or more powerful ship upgrades. Captains gain experience points for every mission they complete, and the more experience points they earn, the more competent they become. If a captain's ship is destroyed, although that captain will still be available for selection for the next mission, his or her experience points will have reverted to zero.

The player can issue commands to either each ship individually, or the fleet as a whole. They can also divide their fleet up into small units and issue separate commands to each unit. Player can choose how their ships attack the enemies by selecting from several pre-set patterns, and can also select what part of the enemy ship to focus their attack on (shields, engines, weapons or general). The player can also choose to divert power on their own ships from one system to another at any time. Player can also utilize transporters to send, for example, a team of engineers to help fix a damaged vessel quickly, or a team of troops to commandeer an enemy vessel.

The game can be played from either side of the conflict; the Federation/Klingon alliance or the Cardassian/Dominion alliance. Depending on which side the player chooses, the levels, missions and overall objectives are very different.

=== Multiplayer ===
In the game's online multiplayer mode, up to 48 ships can compete in a single game. Available game modes include "Free-for-all"; "Domination", "Find the Founder", "Capture" and "Hold and Conquest".

== Story ==
Dominion Wars is set roughly over the course of seasons five, six and seven of Star Trek: Deep Space Nine, in which the Federation and their allies battle against the invading Dominion forces.

=== Federation mode ===
Each mission is introduced by Admiral Ross (voiced by Barry Jenner).

The game begins shortly after Gul Dukat has betrayed his allies in Starfleet and joined the Dominion (see "In Purgatory's Shadow" and "By Inferno's Light"). This move has prompted the Federation and the Klingon Empire to form an alliance in anticipation of the seemingly unavoidable war. Admiral Ross points out that the Cardassians are still bitter about some of the defeats they suffered at the hands of the Maquis (rogue Federation resistance fighters) several years previously, during the border disputes after the Federation-Cardassian Treaty. Starfleet believe that now the Cardassians have the Jem'Hadar backing them up, they will try to wipe out any Maquis settlements in the Badlands. As Starfleet is using the Maquis to transport civilians from Cardassian space, they head into the area to escort the ships. Having successfully evacuated the civilians, Starfleet must now move to defend against a Dominion offensive on Deep Space 9 itself. As they are outnumbered and unable to adequately defend the station, Starfleet have decided to abandon it temporarily, with the aim of recapturing it at a later date. However, before they leave, they activate a cloaked mine field at the entrance to the wormhole, preventing any Dominion reinforcements from coming through (see "Call to Arms").

As the war is now in full swing, Starfleet is continually finding itself outmaneuvered by the Dominion, who seem to know everything Starfleet is doing. The reason for this is a massive sensor array in a remote region of space near Betazed, hidden in an asteroid belt. Starfleet decides that to have any chance in the war, they must destroy the array. Having done so, however, it soon becomes apparent that even without that tactical advantage, the Dominion are building ships much faster than either Starfleet or the Klingons can. A Klingon task force is dispatched to attack and cripple a Dominion shipyard, but a Dominion fleet is simultaneously sent to attack the now defenceless Klingon border. As such, Starfleet must race to get in touch with the Klingons and defend the borders until the Klingons return.

Starfleet then receives word that the Cardassians are planning the public execution of Thomas Riker, a former Starfleet officer who joined the Maquis before being captured by the Cardassians and sentenced to life imprisonment. Refusing to allow his execution, Starfleet sets out to intercept the fleet taking Riker to Cardassia Prime. Having saved Riker, it is then revealed that the Dominion are breeding Jem'Hadar soldiers far faster than was initially thought. To counteract this, Starfleet target the Dominion's largest Ketracel white (a drug to which all Jem'Hadar are genetically addicted) facility in the sector.

The destruction of the Ketracel white facility slows the production of soldiers by 50%. However, the Dominion form a new and unexpected alliance with a powerful but mysterious race known as the Breen (see "'Til Death Do Us Part" and "Strange Bedfellows"). However, at the same time, a new starship has been commissioned by Starfleet, the USS Imperious, an Achilles-class vessel, with Thomas Riker as captain. The introduction of this new vessel, coupled with the recent alliance with the Romulans (see "In the Pale Moonlight") means Starfleet are now ready to retake Deep Space 9 (see "Favor the Bold" and "Sacrifice of Angels"). (Note: This sequence of events differs a great deal from the chronology of events on the show, where the Dominion/Breen alliance does not take place until over a year after the Federation have recaptured Deep Space 9.)

Having retaken the station, Starfleet learns that the Dominion are once again building ships at a dangerous rate. As such, their largest shipyard is completely destroyed. At this stage, with little options left to them, the Dominion go on the offensive, launching a massive invasion of Earth, which Starfleet prevent. The Dominion forces then retreat back to Cardassia Prime to regroup, but the Federation, Klingons and Romulans decide to invade Cardassia, dealing a final blow to the Dominion and winning the war (see "What You Leave Behind").

=== Dominion mode ===
Each mission is introduced by either Gul Dukat (Marc Alaimo) or Weyoun (Jeffrey Combs). (Note: The storyline in this mode is unique to the game; it does not follow the plot of the TV show.)

As with the Federation missions, the game begins shortly after the formation of the Cardassian/Dominion alliance, with the Cardassians moving to wipe out the Maquis, who are attempting to flee the Badlands. Having destroyed the Maquis, the Dominion then move to save a Founder who has been located on a Klingon ship. Having done this, the Dominion are enraged with Starfleet's attempt to block the entrance to the wormhole with a blanket of cloaked mines, attempting to cut the Dominion off from their reinforcements in the Gamma Quadrant. As such, they decide that Deep Space 9 itself must be captured and the mine field destroyed before activation.

Having done so, the Dominion detect a series of Starfleet/Klingon task forces attempting to capture Dominion sensor arrays and shipyards. As such, they send a fleet to block the attacks. However, it is revealed that there was never any intention of attacking the arrays - the entire mission was a feint to catch the Dominion off-guard so Starfleet could rescue Thomas Riker. Now Riker has been placed in charge of a new class of ship, the Achilles-class USS Imperious. The Dominion thus set out to kill him and destroy the new ship. Having successfully done so, the Dominion then send a fleet of Cardassian ships to capture a sensor array. However, upon reaching the array, the Cardassians hand it over to Starfleet and then do the same thing with Deep Space 9. Dissatisfied with their place in the new alliance with the Breen, the Cardassians have abandoned the Dominion and joined with the Federation/Klingon/Romulan alliance (see "The Changing Face of Evil"). As such, the Dominion determine to destroy the Cardassians as a sign of their strength. They begin to annihilate Cardassian colonies and settlements, and then destroy Deep Space 9 itself.

With the destruction of Deep Space 9, reinforcements from the Gamma Quadrant pour through the wormhole and the Alpha Quadrant forces retreat. The Dominion decide to attack the Klingon and Romulans first, destroying their borders and then invading both homeworlds simultaneously. With this accomplished, only the Federation stands against the Dominion. It is determined that Starfleet's main offensive starbase must be destroyed to ensure no major resistance can be launched. With this done, only one objective remains - the invasion of Earth. A massive assault is launched and the Dominion invade the planet, crippling Starfleet and the Federation and taking complete control of the Alpha Quadrant.

== Development ==
The game was developed by Gizmo Industries a company founded in April 1998 by ex-Activision Studios employees, Gary Wagner and Rodney Walden.

== Reception ==
Reception

Aggregate score
Aggregator	Score
Metacritic	64/100

Review scores
Publication	Score
4Players	65%
AllGame	2.5/5
Computer Gaming World	3/5
Eurogamer	6/10
Game Informer	4.25/10
GameSpot	6/10
IGN	5.8/10
PC Gamer (US)	58%
PC Zone	64%

Star Trek: Deep Space Nine: Dominion Wars received "mixed" reviews according to the review aggregation website Metacritic.

Eurogamer's Tom Bramwell called it "a fairly bland, totally linear strategy romp through space by the numbers." He praised the online multiplayer mode and graphics, but was critical of the overly complicated controls and several recurring bugs, such as commands not registering with ships and a bug which made mid-level saves impossible in the initial release version of the game (although he acknowledged a patch had been released to fix this). He concluded that "Star Trek: Dominion Wars is an interesting, occasionally exciting game that suffers from a few notable flaws. It's not really an accurate portrayal of the final series of DS9 because it's so faceless, but it's pretty good in its own right. If you think the bugs and plodding pace won't trouble you too much, and you like the idea of piloting a band of huge starships around the universe, you could do worse than to check it out."

GameSpot's Bruce Geryk was highly critical of the amount of bugs in the initial release version of the game ("Lockups, crashes, bizarre video effects, saved games that disappear for no reason--all of these issues plagued the game when it hit store shelves"). He criticized the lack of a single-player skirmish mode, as well as the rigid linearity of the game. However, he praised the graphics, sounds and camera control. He concluded that "Dominion Wars does a nice job of capturing the feel of the Deep Space Nine universe, and the show's fans will find a lot to like about it as a result. But gamers who are interested in a general space strategy game might find the strategy elements a bit thin. If you're a big fan of Deep Space Nine and just want to fight for the future of Alpha Quadrant, and you also have some patience with potential technical problems, Dominion Wars is worthwhile. But if you want a comprehensive space combat strategy game, you should look elsewhere."

IGN's Dan Adams felt that the game paled in comparison to the TV show; "the game just doesn't hold the same interest as the show. It was just soulless compared to the vibrant portrayal of the situation in the show." He too praised the graphics and sound, but was highly critical of the interface and controls, and argued that the patches released to combat the bugs failed to do their job; "even after all of the patches to fix what was a horribly buggy mess at release, the game still has a bunch of problems -- weird crashes, graphical glitches, a sticky interface and a scrolling feature that barely works just to name a few." He was also critical of the lack of tactical options, arguing that every level "comes down to overpowering your enemies either by numbers or by equipping your ships with special weapons and shield enhancements."

In 2009, Kotaku ranked Dominion Wars as one of the two worst Star Trek games.
