= Penumbra (Star Trek: Deep Space Nine) =

- Star Trek: Deep Space Nine episode
- Episode no.: Season 7 Episode 17
- Directed by: Steve Posey
- Written by: René Echevarria
- Production code: 567
- Original air date: April 5, 1999

Guest appearances
- Marc Alaimo as Dukat; Casey Biggs as Damar; Jeffrey Combs as Weyoun; Salome Jens as Female Changeling; Penny Johnson Jerald as Kasidy Yates; Deborah Lacey as Sarah Sisko; Michelle Horn as Saghi

Episode chronology
← Previous "Inter Arma Enim Silent Leges"	Next → "'Til Death Do Us Part"
- Star Trek: Deep Space Nine season 7

"Penumbra" is the 167th episode of the television series Star Trek: Deep Space Nine, the 17th episode of the seventh season. It aired on syndicated television the week of April 5, 1999.

Set in the 24th century, the series follows the adventures of the crew of the Starfleet-managed space station Deep Space Nine near the planet Bajor, as the Bajorans recover from a decades-long occupation by the imperialistic Cardassians. The station is adjacent to a wormhole connecting Bajor to the distant Gamma Quadrant; the wormhole is home to powerful alien beings worshipped by the Bajorans as the godlike "Prophets", who have made Deep Space Nine's human captain Benjamin Sisko their "Emissary". The later seasons of the series follow a war between the United Federation of Planets and the Dominion, an expansionist empire from the Gamma Quadrant ruled by the shapeshifting Changelings, which has already absorbed Cardassia.

This episode begins the nine-episode/10-hour concluding story arc of the series, which brings the Dominion War and other story elements to a close. In this episode, Lt. Cmdr. Worf is missing in action after his ship is attacked by the Dominion, and Lt. Ezri Dax goes in search of him; both end up captured by enigmatic aliens known as the Breen. Ezri is a member of the Trill species, symbiotically joined to the long-lived sluglike creature Dax; the previous host of Dax was Worf's late wife Jadzia, and the complex fact of Ezri's existence leads to complicated feelings between her and Worf.

== Plot ==
Worf is reported lost in a perilous region of space known as the Badlands after the ship he was commanding was destroyed by a Dominion attack; the USS Defiant recovers some survivors of Worf's ship but not Worf himself. Ezri Dax, feeling an obligation to Worf due to her memories of Jadzia, takes a runabout to the Badlands to search for him herself. Dax has the computer extrapolate a likely entry point for Worf's escape pod into the Badlands, and then takes the runabout in and cuts the engine, allowing the currents to carry her to Worf's position.

Once Dax has rescued Worf, their conversation on the runabout is awkward; he resents her treating him as if she were Jadzia. When the runabout is attacked by Dominion ships, they escape by transporting themselves to a nearby planet, but have no way of calling for help. Camping on the planet for days, they argue about Jadzia; their fight eventually turns into a kiss and then sex. Later that evening, the two are abducted and imprisoned on a Breen ship.

Meanwhile, side plots in the episode focus on other character arcs and subplots in the Dominion War story arc:

- Sisko buys land on Bajor, planning to build a house there for his retirement, and proposes marriage to his girlfriend Kasidy Yates. However, he receives a vision from the Prophets, who tell him that marrying Yates will bring him great sorrow.
- The Changelings are secretly suffering from an unexplained illness, and no progress has been made in finding a cure.
- The Cardassian leader Damar is growing more and more discontent with Dominion rule. He is visited by Dukat, his predecessor as leader of Cardassia, who has become a member of a cult worshipping the Prophets' enemies, the Pah-wraiths; Dukat undergoes cosmetic surgery to disguise himself as a Bajoran.

== Reception ==
In 2014, The A.V. Club noted, that although this is one episode, its plot is highly serialized into Season Seven of this television show. Tor.com gave it 6 out of 10.

In 2015, Geek.com recommended this episode as "essential watching" for their abbreviated Star Trek: Deep Space Nine binge-watching guide, as well as every episode after this.

In 2020, this was noted for Star Trek including opera, in this case a scene where it is mentioned that Worf sang some Klingon opera to pass the time while stuck in an escape pod.
