= Strange Bedfellows (Star Trek: Deep Space Nine) =

- Star Trek: Deep Space Nine episode
- Episode no.: Season 7 Episode 19
- Directed by: René Auberjonois
- Written by: Ronald D. Moore
- Production code: 569
- Original air date: April 19, 1999

Guest appearances
- Louise Fletcher as Kai Winn; Penny Johnson as Kasidy Yates; Jeffrey Combs as Weyoun; Marc Alaimo as Gul Dukat; Casey Biggs as Damar; J. G. Hertzler as Martok; James Otis as Solbor; Salome Jens as Female Changeling

Episode chronology
← Previous "'Til Death Do Us Part"	Next → "The Changing Face of Evil"
- Star Trek: Deep Space Nine season 7

"Strange Bedfellows" is the 169th episode of the television series Star Trek: Deep Space Nine. It is one of eight episodes of Deep Space Nine directed by Rene Auberjonois, who also played the role of Odo on the series.

Set in the 24th century, the series follows the adventures of the crew of the Starfleet-managed space station Deep Space Nine near the planet Bajor, as the Bajorans recover from a decades-long occupation by the imperialistic Cardassians. The station is adjacent to a wormhole connecting Bajor to the distant Gamma Quadrant; the wormhole is home to powerful alien beings worshipped by the Bajorans as the godlike "Prophets", who have made Deep Space Nine's human captain Benjamin Sisko their "Emissary". The later seasons of the series follow a war between the United Federation of Planets and the Dominion, an expansionist empire from the Gamma Quadrant, which has already absorbed Cardassia; the Dominion is ruled by the shapeshifting Changelings and administered by the genetically-engineered, cloned Vorta.

This is the third episode of the nine-episode concluding story arc of the series, which brings the Dominion War and other story elements to a close. The episode follows two major plot threads. As the Dominion allies with the enigmatic aliens known as the Breen, the Cardassian leader Damar grows more and more discontent with Dominion rule and eventually decides to turn against it; meanwhile, Kai Winn, the conniving spiritual leader of Bajor, wrestles with her faith and eventually chooses to abandon the Prophets in favor of their evil counterparts, the Pah-wraiths. A third thread examines the complicated feelings between Deep Space Nine officers Ezri Dax and Worf: Ezri is a member of the Trill species, symbiotically joined to the long-lived sluglike creature Dax, and the previous host of Dax was Worf's late wife Jadzia.

The episode received Nielsen ratings of 4.2 points, equating to almost 4.2 million viewers when it was aired on television in April 1999.

== Plot ==
The Breen officer Thot Gor, having captured Worf and Dax some days earlier, delivers them into Dominion custody. The new alliance between the Dominion and Breen allows the Dominion to further marginalize the Cardassians: Cardassian leader Damar objects to terms of the treaty establishing the Breen alliance, and to Thot Gor being given access to Cardassian classified information, but the Vorta official Weyoun disregards his concerns. When the planet Septimus III is attacked by the Federation's Klingon allies, the Dominion abandons the planet's 500,000 strong Cardassian garrison to be massacred purely to slow down the Federation's advance.

Weyoun and Damar tell Worf and Dax that they will be executed if they refuse to cooperate with the Dominion; Worf responds by killing Weyoun with his bare hands. Amused, Damar reminds him that he will merely be replaced by another Weyoun clone. Expecting to be executed, Worf and Dax apologize to each other for letting their memories of Jadzia define their relationship, and agree to be "friends, and more". As they are taken to be executed, Damar finally acts on his growing disgust with the Dominion's control of Cardassia; he frees Worf and Dax and informs them he will help the Federation.

Meanwhile, Gul Dukat, the former leader of Cardassia, now a worshipper of the Pah-wraiths, has disguised himself as a Bajoran and become close to Kai Winn. When Winn experiences a vision from the Pah-wraiths, telling her to reject the Prophets, she is horrified; she meditates and prays but is unable to feel a connection with the Prophets. Dukat tells her that he himself was sent to her by the Pah-wraiths; he plays to her longing for power, reminding her that the Prophets have never given her anything and have favored Sisko over her. Distraught, she calls on Colonel Kira, DS9's pious Bajoran first officer, for advice; Kira suggests that to regain the Prophets' favor, she must abandon the ambition and jealousy that led her astray, and resign as Kai. Unwilling to give up power, she rejects the advice, returns to Dukat, and tells him she will accept the path of the Pah-wraiths.

== Reception ==
In 2017, Comic Book Resources ranked Kai Winn and Bajoran Dukat (i.e. Anjohl), the seventh best romantic relationship of the Star Trek franchise.

Zach Handlen, writing for The A.V. Club, praised this episode and the preceding one, "'Til Death Do Us Part", praising the characterization of Winn and Dukat, the development of Worf and Dax's friendship, and Damar's "unexpected, inevitable, and thrilling" character growth. Tor.com gave the episode 7 out of 10.
