= 'Til Death Do Us Part (Star Trek: Deep Space Nine) =

- Star Trek: Deep Space Nine episode
- Episode no.: Season 7 Episode 18
- Directed by: Winrich Kolbe
- Written by: David Weddle; Bradley Thompson
- Production code: 568
- Original air date: April 12, 1999

Guest appearances
- Marc Alaimo as Dukat; Casey Biggs as Damar; Jeffrey Combs as Weyoun; Aron Eisenberg as Nog; Louise Fletcher as Kai Winn; Barry Jenner as Admiral Ross; Salome Jens as Female Changeling; Penny Johnson Jerald as Kasidy Yates; Deborah Lacey as Sarah Sisko; James Otis as Solbor

Episode chronology
| ← Previous "Penumbra" | Next → "Strange Bedfellows" |
- Star Trek: Deep Space Nine season 7

"'Til Death Do Us Part" is the 168th episode of the television series Star Trek: Deep Space Nine. This episode first aired the week of April 12, 1999 on syndicated television.

Set in the 24th century, the series follows the adventures of the crew of the Starfleet-managed space station Deep Space Nine near the planet Bajor, as the Bajorans recover from a decades-long occupation by the imperialistic Cardassians. The station is adjacent to a wormhole connecting Bajor to the distant Gamma Quadrant; the wormhole is home to powerful alien beings worshipped by the Bajorans as the godlike "Prophets", who have made Deep Space Nine's human captain Benjamin Sisko their "Emissary". The later seasons of the series follow a war between the United Federation of Planets and the Dominion, an expansionist empire from the Gamma Quadrant, which has already absorbed Cardassia.

This is the second episode of the nine-episode concluding story arc of the series, which brings the Dominion War and other story elements to a close. The episode follows several major plot threads. Sisko marries his fiancée Kasidy Yates, defying a warning from the Prophets that the marriage will bring sorrow; Gul Dukat, the former leader of Cardassia and now a worshipper of the Prophets' enemies, the Pah-wraiths, begins to win over the power-hungry Bajoran spiritual leader Kai Winn; and Deep Space Nine officers Ezri Dax and Worf are being held prisoner by the enigmatic aliens known as the Breen. Ezri is a member of the Trill species, symbiotically joined to the long-lived sluglike creature Dax; the previous host of Dax was Worf's late wife Jadzia, and the complex fact of Ezri's existence leads to complicated feelings between her and Worf.

The episode was originally to be titled "Umbra"; the title was changed to "'Til Death Do Us Part" in production.

== Plot ==
Kai Winn experiences what she believes to be a vision from the Prophets—the first vision the Prophets have sent her. They say that "the Sisko has faltered," that they have chosen her to guide the "Restoration" of Bajor, and that she will be aided by a guide who has "the wisdom of the land." Dukat, disguised as a Bajoran, visits Kai Winn, posing as Anjohl Tennan, a Bajoran farmer whose life was spared during the occupation by Winn's intervention. Winn believes that this "man of the land" is the guide the Prophets sent her. Dukat plays to Winn's ego and her jealousy of Sisko's status as the Emissary. Winn and "Anjohl" quickly become very close, to the disapproval of Solbor, one of Winn's aides.

Sisko tells Yates that the Prophets warned him against getting married, and breaks off their engagement. Although Colonel Kira, his Bajoran first officer, tells him he is doing the right thing by following the will of the Prophets, he is miserable. He chases Yates down before she leaves DS9 and tells her he wants to marry her regardless of what the Prophets say. They are married immediately in a last-minute ceremony; Sisko has another vision from the Prophets during the ceremony, but tells them that he will never be happy without her.

Dax and Worf, held prisoner on a Breen ship, continue arguing about their complex relationship, their recent ill-advised sexual encounter, and Jadzia's legacy. They are both painfully interrogated by the Breen. After returning from her interrogation session, Dax deliriously declares her love for Dr. Julian Bashir, inflaming Worf's jealousy. Eventually the Breen deliver Worf and Dax into the custody of the Dominion, revealing that the Breen have allied themselves with the Dominion.

== Reception ==
The episode had a Nielsen rating of 4.1 percent, placing 14th in its timeslot.

Zack Handlen of The A.V. Club notes interplay between two major threads dealing with religion, one with Sisko and Kassidy Yates, and another revolving around Kai Winn. They note Winn seems to use religion as justification for her corrupt and selfish ambitions, while Sisko confronts his convictions about Kassidy conflicting with his spiritual role to the Bajoran people, and there is also an interplay between these two plots.
