= The Adversary (Star Trek: Deep Space Nine) =

- Star Trek: Deep Space Nine episode
- Odo (right) fighting a Changeling
- Episode no.: Season 3 Episode 26
- Directed by: Alexander Singer
- Written by: Ira Steven Behr; Robert Hewitt Wolfe
- Cinematography by: Jonathan West
- Production code: 472
- Original air date: June 19, 1995
- Running time: 45 minutes

Guest appearances
- Lawrence Pressman as Krajensky / Changeling; Kenneth Marshall as Michael Eddington; Jeff Austin as Bolian; Majel Barrett as Computer Voice

Episode chronology
← Previous "Facets"	Next → "The Way of the Warrior"
- Star Trek: Deep Space Nine season 3

"The Adversary" is the 72nd episode of the syndicated American science fiction television series Star Trek: Deep Space Nine, the season finale of the third season.

Set in the 24th century, the series follows the adventures of the crew of Deep Space Nine, a space station located near a stable wormhole between the Alpha and Gamma quadrants of the Milky Way Galaxy; the Gamma Quadrant is home to the Dominion, a hostile empire controlled by the shape-shifting Changelings. In this episode, set mostly on the starship Defiant, the newly promoted Captain Sisko (Avery Brooks) and the crew must stop a Changeling infiltrator attempting to start a war between the United Federation of Planets and one of its neighbors. The episode guest stars Lawrence Pressman as an ambassador, and Kenneth Marshall appears in his recurring role as Michael Eddington.

"The Adversary" achieved a Nielsen rating of 7.1 points and third place for that time slot at its debut on syndicated television networks in June 1995.

== Plot ==
At a ceremony marking Deep Space Nine's commanding officer Benjamin Sisko's promotion to the rank of captain, visiting Ambassador Krajensky tells Sisko that the Tzenkethi, an alien race with a history of hostility toward the Federation, have unseated their ruler, the Autarch, in a coup d'etat. Warning that the Autarch's replacement might renew anti-Federation hostilities, he says Sisko is ordered to bring the Defiant on a "show the flag" mission along the Tzenkethi border.

Along the way, the crew loses control of the ship's critical systems, including navigation and weapons, and Chief O'Brien's investigation reveals sabotage. When O'Brien and Lt. Dax search the crew, Krajensky is revealed to be a Changeling impostor, who flees into the depths of the ship; the crew infer that he has taken control of the ship to cause a war between the Federation and Tzenkethi. Hours of searching cause paranoia among the crew, as the Changeling could be disguised as any of them. Sisko orders Dr. Bashir to administer blood tests to the crew to identify the Changeling, and the tests seem to reveal Lt. Cmdr. Michael Eddington as the impostor; but in fact the Changeling was disguised as Bashir in order to fake Eddington's blood test, and escapes again.

As a last resort to prevent the ship from attacking the Tzenkethi, Sisko readies the ship's self-destruct system, while O'Brien tries to override the Changeling's control of the ship's systems. Constable Odo, a Changeling who has rejected the Dominion, fights the infiltrator in the engine room and kills him, thus becoming the first Changeling to harm another. O'Brien regains control of the ship and Sisko cancels the self-destruct. When they return to Deep Space Nine, they learn that the real Ambassador Krajensky was kidnapped and replaced by the Changeling impostor before ever arriving at the station, and the report of a Tzenkethi coup was false; the entire affair was a Dominion plot to destabilize the Alpha Quadrant. Odo repeats to the others the Changeling's last words: "You are too late. We are everywhere."

== Reception ==
Keith DeCandido of Tor.com rated the episode five out of ten.

In 2015, Geek.com recommended this episode as "essential watching" for their abbreviated Star Trek: Deep Space Nine binge-watching guide, which they note focuses on the changelings.

In 2020, Den of Geek ranked this episode as the 14th most scary episode of all Star Trek franchise television episodes.

== Releases ==
This episode was released on October 2, 1998 in Japan as part of the half-season LaserDisc box set 3rd Season Vol. 2. The format included both English and Japanese audio tracks, as well as Japanese captions.

The episode was released on June 3, 2003 in North America as part of the Season 3 DVD box set.
