= Indiscretion (Star Trek: Deep Space Nine) =

- Star Trek: Deep Space Nine episode
- Episode no.: Season 4 Episode 4
- Directed by: LeVar Burton
- Story by: Nicholas Corea
- Teleplay by: Toni Marberry; Jack Trevino
- Production code: 477
- Original air date: October 23, 1995

Guest appearances
- Marc Alaimo as Gul Dukat; Penny Johnson as Kasidy Yates; Roy Brocksmith as Razka; Cyia Batten as Ziyal

Episode chronology
← Previous "Hippocratic Oath"	Next → "Rejoined"
- Star Trek: Deep Space Nine season 4

"Indiscretion" is the 77th episode of the television series Star Trek: Deep Space Nine and the fourth episode of the fourth season.

Set in the 24th century, the series follows the adventures on Deep Space Nine, a space station near the planet Bajor, as Bajor recovers from a long and brutal occupation by the imperialistic Cardassians. In this episode, Major Kira Nerys, a Bajoran, goes on a mission with Gul Dukat, the Cardassian former overseer of Bajor, to look for survivors of a destroyed ship.

This episode expands on the backstories of Dukat, the Cardassian occupation of Bajor, and the resistance cell Kira was involved with during the occupation. This episode also introduces the character Tora Ziyal, Dukat's half-Bajoran daughter, and marks the first appearance of the alien race known as the Breen.

This episode was written by Nicholas Corea, from a story by Toni Marberry and Jack Tevino and directed by LeVar Burton. It aired in broadcast syndication on October 23, 1995.

== Plot ==
A Bajoran smuggler tells Major Kira that he has recovered a piece of metal that might be from the Ravinok, a Cardassian ship that disappeared six years before with a group of Bajoran prisoners on board, including a friend of Kira's. She makes plans to investigate, but the Cardassian government insists on sending Gul Dukat to accompany her. The two travel to a desert planet near where the fragment was found, and they find the wreckage of the Ravinok.

Kira and Dukat discover twelve graves near the wreckage, but since several more people were on the ship, they conclude that some survivors may still be alive. First, however, Dukat opens the graves in order to identify the bodies and is overcome with grief when he finds the remains of a Bajoran woman who was his mistress. They soon set off on foot, scanning the planet for survivors. While setting up camp, Dukat reveals that he and his mistress had a daughter, Tora Ziyal, who may be among the survivors. Unfortunately, if he finds her alive, he plans to kill her to avoid a scandal that would endanger his Cardassian family and career. Kira tells Dukat she will not allow him to kill Ziyal.

Kira and Dukat discover a mining operation of Bajoran and Cardassian prisoners, supervised by the Breen. Dukat sees his half-Cardassian, half-Bajoran daughter among the prisoners. Disguised as Breen, Kira and Dukat infiltrate the mine, overcome the guards, and free the prisoners. Kira is sad to learn that her friend died two years earlier, but Dukat is only interested in finding his daughter. When he finds her, she instantly recognizes her father and is thrilled to see him, despite the fact he is aiming a phaser rifle at her. Kira arrives and tries to stop him. Ziyal realizes what is happening and tells her father she would rather die if she cannot go with him. She hugs him affectionately, and Dukat, shaken with emotion, decides to take Ziyal home — even if it costs him everything he has.

Meanwhile, in a side plot on Deep Space Nine, Captain Benjamin Sisko learns that his girlfriend, Kasidy Yates, has been offered a job on Bajor and is considering moving to the station. Instead of congratulating her, Sisko can only express his anxiety about escalating their relationship; but Sisko's friends and his son Jake convince him to apologize to her.

== Production ==
The story about how Dukat and Kira track down Dukat's half-Bajoran child was pitched by two freelance writers, and it was very appealing to the show's producers. It was said to be reminiscent of the 1956 Western film The Searchers. Director LeVar Burton liked the story, as well, because of how the two adversaries had to re-examine themselves over the course of the episode.

This was the first episode of Star Trek: Deep Space Nine directed by LeVar Burton, who had previously directed some episodes of Star Trek: The Next Generation and was part of the main cast as the character Geordi.

The outdoor scene was filmed at Soledad Canyon in southern California.

== Reception ==
In 2018, SyFy recommend this episode for its abbreviated watch guide for the Bajoran character Kira Nerys. They called it "a treat" to see the fiery acting performances of Visitor and Alaimo (playing Kira and Dukat, respectively).

Writing for Tor.com in 2014, Keith R.A. DeCandido gave the episode a favorable review with a rating of 8 out of 10. He praised the acting performances of Visitor, Alaimo, and Brooks, and commended the episode for creating a more humanized portrait of Dukat without making him seem sympathetic to Kira or the viewer.

In 2020, io9 listed this episode as one of the "must-watch" episodes of the series.

== Releases ==
On August 5, 1998, "Indiscretion" was released in LaserDisc format in Japan, as part of the 4th season (vol.1) box set.
