= The Changing Face of Evil =

- Star Trek: Deep Space Nine episode
- Episode no.: Season 7 Episode 20
- Directed by: Mike Vejar
- Written by: Ira Steven Behr; Hans Beimler
- Production code: 570
- Original air date: April 26, 1999

Guest appearances
- Louise Fletcher as Kai Winn; Jeffrey Combs as Weyoun; Penny Johnson Jerald as Kasidy Yates; Marc Alaimo as Gul Dukat; Casey Biggs as Damar; J. G. Hertzler as General Martok; Aron Eisenberg as Nog; Barry Jenner as Admiral Ross; James Otis as Solbor; John Vickery as Rusot; Salome Jens as Female Changeling

Episode chronology
← Previous "Strange Bedfellows"	Next → "When It Rains…"
- Star Trek: Deep Space Nine season 7

"The Changing Face of Evil" is the 170th episode of the television series Star Trek: Deep Space Nine. It was first aired on syndicated television on April 26, 1999.

Set in the 24th century, the series follows the adventures of the crew of the Starfleet-managed space station Deep Space Nine near the planet Bajor, as the Bajorans recover from a decades-long occupation by the imperialistic Cardassians. The station is adjacent to a wormhole connecting Bajor to the distant Gamma Quadrant; the wormhole is home to powerful alien beings worshipped by the Bajorans as the godlike "Prophets". The later seasons of the series follow a war between the United Federation of Planets and the Dominion, an expansionist empire from the Gamma Quadrant, which has already absorbed Cardassia; the Dominion is ruled by the shapeshifting Changelings and administered by the genetically-engineered, cloned Vorta.

This is the fourth episode of the nine-episode concluding story arc of the series, which brings the Dominion War and other story elements to a close. In episodes preceding this one, the Dominion has forged a new alliance with the enigmatic aliens known as the Breen, while Gul Dukat, the Cardassian who governed Bajor under the occupation, has disguised himself as a Bajoran under the name "Anjohl" and won the favor of the ambitious Bajoran spiritual leader Kai Winn. In this episode, the Breen alliance turns the tide of the war in the Dominion's favor, leading to costly losses for the Federation; but the Cardassian leader Damar, having grown more and more discontent with Dominion rule, launches a rebellion to regain Cardassian independence. Meanwhile, Kai Winn, having abandoned the Prophets in favor of their evil counterparts, the Pah-wraiths, under Dukat's influence, commits herself further to the Pah-wraiths' path.

== Plot ==
The Breen make their alliance with the Dominion known by attacking Starfleet Headquarters in San Francisco. Deep Space Nine's commanding officer, Benjamin Sisko, is concerned for the safety of his wife, Kasidy Yates, a freighter captain. Sisko pulls political strings to get Yates time off from her job; she protests, reminding him that her job is just as important to her as his is to him, and he apologizes and cancels his request. Meanwhile, Damar begins plotting to free Cardassia from Dominion rule with the help of several disaffected Cardassian military officers.

Dukat persuades Winn to read the Book of the Kosst Amojan, a forbidden text that contains secret information about how to release the Pah-wraiths. Winn's aide Solbor reluctantly brings her the book, but to her surprise, its pages are blank. Suspicious of Winn's interest in evil texts and of her new companion's influence on her, Solbor investigates "Anjohl" and discovers that he is actually Gul Dukat. Winn is horrified to learn the truth about "Anjohl", but when Solbor discovers and threatens to expose that they plan to release the Pah-wraiths, Winn kills him. His blood drips on the Book of the Kosst Amojan and makes the text visible.

Emboldened by the alliance with the Breen, the Dominion launches an offensive to retake Chin'toka, a star system captured by the Federation some months earlier. In the ensuing battle, the Federation alliance suffers one of its worst defeats of the war; Sisko's ship, the USS Defiant, is among the many ships destroyed when the Breen unleash their newest weapon, an energy-damping beam that renders weapons and drive systems powerless. The Changeling in command of the Dominion forces allows the survivors to escape, reasoning that their reports will have a demoralizing effect on their comrades.

As the Federation tries to regroup from this devastating loss, Damar broadcasts a public message announcing that Cardassia will revolt against the Dominion; he begins the rebellion by destroying a Vorta cloning facility. Sisko realizes that Damar's rebellion may be the key to defeating the Dominion.

== Reception ==
Keith R. A. DeCandido of Tor.com rated the episode 6 out of 10. He was critical of the episode's repetitiveness and the slow progress of the Winn-Dukat subplot, but praised the spectacle of the battle scenes and Damar's turn against the Dominion.

In 2018, Comic Book Resources ranked the sequence of episodes beginning with "The Changing Face of Evil" and leading up to the end of Deep Space Nine as the best multi-episode saga of the Star Trek franchise.

In 2020, The Digital Fix ranked this episode as the tenth best episode of Star Trek: Deep Space Nine. They thought the episode's tensions and surprises "raised the stakes", supporting the continuing story arc in the concluding ten episodes of the series.
