= Dominion War =

Star Trek: Deep Space Nine conflict

- Part of Star Trek: Deep Space Nine
Date	2373–2375
Location	Primarily the Alpha and Gamma Quadrants of the Milky Way
Result	Federation Alliance victory Treaty of Bajor: Dominion withdrawal to Gamma Quadrant; Female Changeling is taken into custody by the Federation for war crimes.; Collapse of the Cardassian Union; Klingon Empire greatly weakened

Belligerents
Federation Alliance: United Federation of Planets; Klingon Empire; Bajoran Republic (2374–75); Romulan Star Empire (2374–75); Cardassian Liberation Front (2375); Cardassian Union (Battle of Cardassia only); Supported By: Ferengi Alliance	Dominion; Alliance: Dominion; Cardassian Union (2373–2375); Breen Confederacy (2375); Supported by: Son'a (Ketracel-white production)

Commanders and leaders
United Federation of Planets: Benjamin Sisko; Admiral Ross; Klingon Empire: Gowron (2373-2375); Worf (2375); Martok (2375); Cardassian Liberation Front/Union: Damar (2375)	Dominion: Weyoun; Female Changeling; Cardassian Union: Gul Dukat (2373-2374); Legate Damar (2374-2375); Legate Broca (2375); Breen Confederacy: Thot Gor

Strength
1,500+ Klingon ships holding front lines near the end of the war in 2375, around 600 Federation Starship participated in the "Operation Return" in order to recapture "Deep Space Nine" Station in 2374.	30,000+ ships near the end of the war

Casualties and losses
Unknown	At least 7 million Cardassian soldiers, other losses unknown
- 800 million Cardassian civilians killed by Dominion

The Dominion War is an extended plot concept developed in several story arcs of Star Trek: Deep Space Nine, an American science-fiction television series produced by Paramount Pictures. In the fictional Star Trek universe, the Dominion War is a conflict between the forces of the Dominion, the Cardassian Union, and, eventually, the Breen Confederacy against the Alpha Quadrant alliance of the United Federation of Planets, the Klingon Empire and, later, the Romulan Star Empire. The war takes place in the final two seasons of the series, but was gradually built up to over the course of the five preceding seasons.

The principal setting of the series is the Starfleet-controlled space station Deep Space Nine, located adjacent to the mouth of a stable wormhole near the planet Bajor. The Bajoran wormhole provides near-instantaneous travel to the Gamma Quadrant, a region on the other side of the galaxy. During the second season of Deep Space Nine, the Dominion, a powerful empire in the Gamma Quadrant, is introduced; and over the course of the second and third seasons, more information about the Dominion is revealed. Conflict escalates through the fourth and fifth seasons, as the Dominion infiltrates Alpha Quadrant powers and eventually forms an alliance with Cardassia; open warfare begins at the end of the fifth season, when the Dominion briefly occupies Deep Space Nine, and continues until the Dominion is finally defeated in the series finale.

The Dominion War arcs present themes that challenge the values of the characters in a manner not attempted in earlier series of Star Trek. Developing the plot of the Dominion War also altered how the series was scripted, shifting the emphasis from an episodic to a serialized narrative format.

== Dominion ==
The Dominion
- Star Trek race
- Created by: Founders: Rick Berman and Michael Piller; Jem'Hadar and Vorta: Ira Steven Behr

In-universe information
- Created by: Changelings/The Founders
- Creation date: circa 7600 B.C.
- Capital: Gamma Quadrant
- Language: Dominionese, (see Universal translator)
- Currency: Isik
- Affiliation: Founders; Vorta; Jem'Hadar
- Leader: The Founders

The Dominion is an interstellar state and military superpower from the Gamma Quadrant, composed of hundreds of dominated alien species. The Dominion is commanded by The Founders, a race of shapeshifters (or Changelings as they are often referred to), responsible for both the creation of the Dominion and all strategic decisions undertaken through its history. The Dominion is administered by the Vorta, clones specifically genetically engineered by the Founders to act as field commanders, administrators, scientists and diplomats. The Jem'Hadar, also engineered by the Founders, are the military arm of the Dominion and one of the most powerful military forces in the galaxy during the Dominion's height.

=== Member races ===
The Dominion incorporated a vast number of planets, and their resident species, into its military and civilian ranks, including:

- Changelings/Founders (the rulers of the Dominion)
- Vorta (administrative/diplomatic/scientist class of clones; genetically engineered by the Founders)
- Jem'Hadar (shock troops under the direct command of the Vorta; genetically engineered by the Founders)
- Son'a
- Hunters
- Tosk
- Skreea
- Karemma
- Dosi
- Breen
- Cardassians
- T-Rogorans

Little is revealed regarding the Dominion's inner workings, other than the fact that the Jem'Hadar and Vorta fulfill the main military and administrative roles respectively.

=== Early history ===
The Dominion was established between two thousand and ten thousand years before the events of Star Trek: Deep Space Nine, by the Changelings, a race of liquid lifeforms capable of shapeshifting, as a means of defending themselves against the widespread persecution they faced from humanoid races (whom they called "solids"). These Changelings genetically engineered a series of slave races to act as the foot soldiers of their new empire, and were dubbed the Founders by their new creations. Over 200 years before first contact with Deep Space Nine, the Changelings' Great Link (a planet in the Gamma Quadrant where Changelings exist in their natural "gelatinous" form) had sent out 100 Changeling infants in containers through the universe in order to see how other (alien) races react to the presence of Changelings. Of those sent out, three have been accounted for:

- Odo. Sent into space as an infant, Odo ultimately arrived in the Alpha Quadrant in the region of the planet Bajor, which was under Cardassian occupation at the time. After being studied by a Bajoran scientist, he learns to take humanoid form and eventually becomes Security Chief at Deep Space Nine, a role he maintained once the Federation controlled the station. In a battle with a Changeling spy, Odo ended up killing it, thus breaking the most important rule of his people, that no Changeling may ever hurt another ("The Adversary"). He was punished by the Great Link who took away his shapeshifting abilities and forced to remain a solid in his humanoid form ("Broken Link"). Some months later, he regained his powers after trying to save a dying infant Changeling. Although his deepest desire is to rejoin the Great Link, he is reluctant to do so due to the Founders' crusade of total war against every solid in the Alpha Quadrant. In the last episode of the series, Odo does rejoin the Great Link which saves them from being totally destroyed by a genetically engineered virus. ("What You Leave Behind")
- Unnamed Infant Changeling. Obtained by Odo from Quark, Odo tries to teach the infant how to shapeshift. However the infant is dying from radiation poisoning. As its last act, it joins with Odo which restores his ability to shapeshift. ("The Begotten")
- Laas. Over 200 years old, he ended up on the Valara planet whose name "Laas" means "Changeable"; he left when he realized that he was only being tolerated and would never be accepted. He ended up on Deep Space Nine, where he showed his shapeshifting skills were far more advanced than Odo's (even changing into a mist at one point). In self-defense, he killed a Klingon warrior who was going to assault him; and with the help of Major Kira, he escaped. He vowed to search the Alpha Quadrant in order to find the other missing Hundred Changelings like himself and Odo in order to create a new Great Link. ("Chimera")

=== First contact and escalation ===
The Dominion was unknown to the Alpha Quadrant powers until the discovery of the Bajoran wormhole in 2369, which facilitated exploration of the Gamma Quadrant. In 2370, Jem'Hadar troops annihilated numerous Bajoran and Federation colonies and ships in the Gamma Quadrant and captured Commander Benjamin Sisko, as the Dominion demanded the Federation stay on their side of the "anomaly". A Federation starship, the USS Odyssey, was destroyed by a kamikaze attack after the Federation rescued Sisko, as the Dominion demonstrated not only an ability to penetrate shielding, but a fanatical devotion to their cause as the suicide attack was made on a retreating ship, solely to drive the point home to the Federation. As a result of this incident, the Federation pulled the USS Defiant out of storage (which was originally designed to combat the Borg), complete with a Romulan cloaking device, and began preparations for a drastic increase in Deep Space Nine's defensive capabilities.

A Federation mission the next year to find and make peace with the Founders ended disastrously, when the peace expedition was captured and subjected to hallucinogenic manipulation to test the willingness of the Federation to appease the Dominion. As a result of this incident, it was discovered that the reclusive Founders of the organization (previously unseen) were the Changelings. The Changelings justified their actions by the need to protect their species against persecution by "solids", and also spoke of a duty and inclination to "impose order on a chaotic universe".

As a result of the continued Dominion threat, numerous Alpha Quadrant powers acted with increased preparations and paranoia, one expression of which was the Romulan attempt to forcibly collapse the wormhole. Despite the Dominion's warnings, the Federation continued to chart the Gamma Quadrant. Founders began infiltrating the Alpha Quadrant, even wreaking havoc on Earth itself. In 2371, the combined intelligence organizations of the Cardassian Union and Romulan Star Empire attempted a strike into the Gamma Quadrant with a cloaked fleet, seeking to destroy the Founders' homeworld and cripple the Dominion. Due to intensive Changeling manipulation, this attack force was ambushed while assaulting an abandoned planet that was believed to be the supposed Founder homeworld, and was completely crushed. It is later revealed that the main advocate of attacking the Dominion was a Changeling infiltrator. This failure weakened the Cardassians and Romulans and paved the way for Dominion intrusion into the Alpha Quadrant. A Changeling impersonating Federation Ambassador Krajensky informed newly promoted Captain Sisko that there was a coup on Tzenketh. The Changeling later sabotaged the Defiant and reprogrammed it to target the Tzenkethi in the hopes that the attack would trigger a war, allowing the Dominion to conquer the Alpha Quadrant. The Federation stopped the Changeling and retook control of the Defiant.

The quadrant was plunged into conflict when the Klingon Empire accused the Cardassian Union of being under the control of the Founders. When the Federation condemned the Klingon attack on Cardassia, Gowron banished Federation citizens from Klingon space, recalled their ambassadors and withdrew from the Khitomer Accords. The Federation and Cardassians fought months of armed combat against the Klingons. It was later revealed by Benjamin Sisko, Worf, Miles O'Brien and Odo that it was the Klingons themselves who unknowingly had a Changeling in their midst, pretending to be General Martok. Gowron rejoined the Khitomer Accords and joined to fight the Dominion.

== Synopsis ==
In "Emissary", the pilot episode, the United Federation of Planets dispatches Commander Benjamin Sisko to take command of the space station Deep Space Nine. During the episode, it is discovered that the station is located near a stable wormhole connecting the Alpha Quadrant to the Gamma Quadrant of the Milky Way Galaxy, nearly 70,000 light years away. Deep Space Nine is moved from the orbit of the planet Bajor to the Alpha Quadrant terminus of the wormhole to lay claim. Starships begin to enter the wormhole to explore, colonize and trade. The crews on the ships are unaware that they are entering a region of space controlled by the Dominion, a union of planets ordered by force and intimidation.

During the second season, Quark, a Ferengi bartender sent by his government to begin trade negotiations in the Gamma Quadrant, makes contact with the Karemma, a Dominion member race. Some time later, he and Sisko are captured by the Jem'Hadar, the soldiers of the Dominion. They are rescued, but Jem'Hadar destroy the Federation ship USS Odyssey and Bajoran colonies in the Gamma Quadrant as a warning not to re-enter Dominion space. Soon, it is revealed that a race of shapeshifters, known as "Changelings" or "the Founders", are the rulers of the Dominion. The Cardassian and Romulan intelligence agencies, the Obsidian Order and the Tal Shiar, attempt to eradicate the Founders to protect the Alpha Quadrant, but their plans are compromised by Changeling infiltration, and their fleet is ambushed and destroyed.

The Founders initiate a campaign of sabotage and terror against the Alpha Quadrant, which leaves many governments fearful of Changeling infiltrators, who are able to assume any physical form. When Earth is attacked, a band of Starfleet officers illegally attempt to impose martial law at the heart of the Federation. The Klingon Empire invades Cardassia on the incorrect suspicion that the Dominion is influencing its government; this idea turns out to have been planted by a Changeling infiltrator posing as Martok, an influential Klingon general. The invasion of Cardassia leads to a dissolution of the Federation's alliance with the Klingons. The Founders plant false intelligence that it is the Klingon Chancellor, Gowron, who is a Changeling, intended to induce the Federation to assassinate Gowron and further intensify the rift between the Federation and Klingons. The Founders' plan fails when the assassination team, led by Sisko, realize that Martok, not Gowron, was the actual shapeshifter.

The disgraced Cardassian officer Dukat forges an alliance between Cardassia and the Dominion, establishing a Dominion foothold in the Alpha Quadrant, in exchange for being made ruler of Cardassia. Realizing the danger, the Federation and Klingons join forces to slow the Dominion build-up, cooperating to plant a minefield across the entrance to the wormhole to prevent further invasion. Nevertheless, the Dominion begins to advance, and seizes control of Deep Space Nine. After a brief retreat, Sisko executes a successful return to the space station, but the wider conflict continues. More setbacks hinder the Alpha Quadrant alliance as additional races, such as the Breen, offer their support to the Dominion. Questionable tactics are adopted in the search for victory: Sisko uses manufactured intelligence and a murdered senator to convince the Romulans to ally with the Federation; and the Federation's covert-operations agency, Section 31, disseminates an engineered virus among the Founders. Dukat's successor as Cardassian leader, Damar, launches a successful resistance movement against the Dominion; in response, the Dominion attempts genocide against the entire Cardassian race. Eventually, the Dominion is forced back to the planet Cardassia Prime where it is cut off from reinforcements. The Changeling in command informs Odo, a renegade Changeling on the side of the Federation, that they will fight to the end to prevent any counter-attack by the alliance into the Gamma Quadrant. Odo assures her that the Federation would not do that while the other parties would be too weak to. Odo cures her of the disease afflicting her and the other Founders with the antidote he received, and the Dominion agrees to surrender.

== Conception ==
In 2002, Star Trek: Deep Space Nine producer Ira Steven Behr stated that unlike some plots, which originated from a single small idea, the creation of the Dominion villain and story arc was "very much thought out." Behr said that the earliest mention of the Dominion was purposely planted in the comic Season Two Ferengi episode, "Rules of Acquisition", to leave the audience with an impression of "how important could it be?" It was decided that the Gamma Quadrant would need an ambience that would distinguish it from the Alpha Quadrant. The Dominion were mentioned for a second time in the later second-season episode “Sanctuary” but this time giving a hint that they were an aggressive power. The producers wanted to portray the region as something other than "uncharted space", and avoid imitating the adventures of Star Trek: The Next Generation with another series of plots focusing primarily on themes of exploration. After 18 months of Deep Space Nine exposition, the producers decided to characterize The Dominion as "anti-Federation". Writer and script editor Robert Hewitt Wolfe has explained that this move also distinguished Deep Space Nine from its successor series, Star Trek: Voyager, which stars a lost Federation ship traversing the chaotic and divided Delta Quadrant of the Milky Way.

Instead of introducing one alien race, three were introduced simultaneously: the Changelings, the Vorta and the Jem'Hadar. These three were intended to represent the front of an ancient civilization held together by fear, to contrast with the unity of the Federation enabled by bonds of friendship. Behr, Wolfe, writer Peter Allan Fields and Jim Crocker attended meetings to develop the concepts of these species and found general inspiration in Isaac Asimov's Foundation Trilogy novels. Toward the end of Season Two production executive producer Michael Piller suggested the idea that the Founders of the Dominion be the race to which Odo belongs, and discovered that Behr and Wolfe had also discussed this possibility. This character had been introduced with no knowledge of his true origins. Piller asserts that the endeavor to create a new villain was one of the most difficult tasks he undertook in his work on Star Trek. Wolfe perceives similarities between the fictional Founders and the Roman Empire, in that the species first uses diplomacy, deception and cultural imperialism to achieve their aims before ultimately resorting to coercion. Wolfe also characterized the Dominion as a "carrot and stick" empire, with the Vorta offering the carrot and the Jem'Hadar holding the stick.

According to writer Ronald D. Moore, co-creator Rick Berman originally intended the Dominion War to be the focus of three or four episodes, but Behr intended to expand the plotline all along. Moore has stated that Berman sometimes questioned the writing staff about the degree of violence included in some episodes. Berman also expressed concern about the portrayal of long-term consequences for the main characters, such as the loss of a character's leg in Season Seven. The writers argued in favor of the increased violence, asserting that it was justified in view of the plotlines detailing the progression of the Dominion War. Piller supported the idea that the repercussions of past episodes should continue to be felt, and that characters should "learn that actions have consequences", even if such consequences were to lead off in directions Piller had not originally imagined when Deep Space Nine remained in the conceptual stages. Moore has stated that the filming of Star Trek: Voyager occupied more of Berman and Piller's time from Deep Space Nine's third season, which allowed Behr to defend his creative decisions more successfully. Following the completion of Star Trek: The Next Generation, the writing staff could dedicate more time to working on scripts for Deep Space Nine. The writers admired the scripting techniques used for Star Trek: The Original Series: Moore cites the episode "Errand of Mercy" (1967) as a strong influence on his treatment of the Dominion War.

== Development ==
The plot of the Dominion War is presented in a succession of shorter story arcs which span Seasons Two through Seven of Star Trek: Deep Space Nine and are linked editorially by the decisions of the producers and writers.

=== Season Two: Introducing the Dominion ===
After conceptual meetings, the writers began to introduce allusions to the Dominion into episodes of Season Two. The intention was to gradually increase the audience's awareness that there was a large and pervasive polity at work behind apparently innocuous events in the Gamma Quadrant. The Dominion and its methods are revealed across three episodes of the season.

"Rules of Acquisition" marks the first mention of the Dominion, when the Ferengi character Quark hears whispers of a powerful union of civilizations in the Gamma Quadrant with which he may be able to trade. Dialogue that seems inconsequential within the framework of a light-hearted episode was planned to ultimately create major change in the dynamics of Star Trek: Deep Space Nine.

As Alpha Quadrant races begin to colonize planets in the Gamma Quadrant and their presence becomes known, disturbing reports indicate that what the Dominion cannot attain through trade is forcibly seized. These reports are justified in "Sanctuary", when a large fleet of Skrreea ships appears in the Alpha Quadrant, in search of a new homeworld in light of the conquest of their original planet by Dominion forces. The actions of the Dominion are contrasted with the reactions of the regular characters to the Skrreea refugees. Executive producer Michael Piller has suggested that the plot evoked real-world debate surrounding Proposition 187, a Californian law concerning the rights of illegal aliens.

The finale of Season Two, "The Jem'Hadar", permitted writer Robert Hewitt Wolfe to surprise the audience and challenge their opinions concerning the safety of the Federation and Starfleet, when the USS Odyssey, a Galaxy-class starship similar to the USS Enterprise from Star Trek: The Next Generation, is outfought and destroyed. The Dominion is revealed to be a ruthless empire, using "carrot and stick" methods to control others, with three distinct races performing crucial roles. The Dominion's Jem'Hadar shock troops capture Commander Sisko, Quark, and an alien named Eris, who is later identified as a double agent and one of the Vorta, the Dominion's negotiators and administrators. The Jem'Hadar send a representative to Deep Space Nine with the message that no further intrusions into Dominion space will be tolerated and to hand Major Kira Nerys a list of colonies and ships already eliminated for trespassing. The Federation dispatches a rescue team that returns Sisko's group to the station, but, while retreating back to the Alpha Quadrant, a Jem'Hadar ship launches a kamikaze run against the Odyssey, resulting in the destruction of both ships.

=== Season Three: Introducing the Founders ===
With the third season, Ronald D. Moore and others started to write regularly for Star Trek: Deep Space Nine following the completion of Star Trek: The Next Generation. Robert Hewitt Wolfe joined Ira Steven Behr in scripting episodes developing the Dominion plotline, beginning with "The Search". Behr became full executive producer at the midpoint of the season, after the departure of Michael Piller.

In the two-part season opener, "The Search", Commander Sisko returns from Starfleet Headquarters on Earth with a Defiant-class prototype starship, the USS Defiant. Executive producer Rick Berman had to be convinced that the introduction of the Defiant would not distract the audience from the main starship of the latest Star Trek production, Star Trek: Voyager. The decision was made on the basis that a ship was needed to provide an avenue for stories set off the Deep Space Nine space station and that such a vessel would need the potential to oppose the Jem'Hadar, who had already been portrayed obliterating large ships. Audience research had also suggested that young male viewers were hoping for more action-oriented episodes with greater jeopardy.

Season Three's Dominion stories explore the connection between Odo and his people, and their conflicting attitudes toward "solid" sentient lifeforms. The Defiant enters the Gamma Quadrant on a peace mission to locate the Founders in "The Search", and it is discovered that the Founders are of the same race as Odo. Despite a burning desire to return to his home, he finds his people's philosophy – that which you can control cannot hurt you – abhorrent, and he asks to return to the Alpha Quadrant. The Founders, led by a character identified only as the "Female Changeling", acquiesce to Odo's request in the hope that he will ultimately rejoin them.

Another facet to the Dominion was evaluated more closely in Season Three – the Jem'Hadar. In "The Abandoned", a juvenile Jem'Hadar is found alone and matures under Odo's guidance. The crew of Deep Space Nine witnesses the Jem'Hadar's difficulty in adjusting to a society with rules different from those of his native culture. Avery Brooks, directing this episode, has emphasized the story as a metaphor for African-American adolescents in the 20th century and their struggles with addiction and violence, their integration into American society, and how their upbringing might contribute to these problems. Brooks ensured that Odo continued to support the maturing Jem'Hadar despite the alien's regression to Dominion custom, as a commentary on how modern society should engage with young people.

"Improbable Cause" initiates a two-part adventure concerning the search for the Founders' homeworld, which concludes in "The Die is Cast". Following first contact with the Founders, the Obsidian Order – a covert Cardassian intelligence force – ally themselves with the Tal Shiar, their Romulan counterpart, and launch a secret, pre-emptive strike to destroy the Founders' homeworld, hoping that the Founders and the rest of the Dominion will collapse. The Dominion successfully lures the fleets of the Tal Shiar and the Obsidian Order into a trap, eliminating both organizations. The plot establishes an atmosphere of suspicion amongst the Alpha Quadrant powers, initiated by the shapeshifters' abilities to assume other identities, which forms the basis of plots for Season Four.

The Season Three finale turned out to differ significantly from the production staff's conceptual vision. Paramount did not favor the idea of a season-end cliffhanger which would have revealed the presence of shapeshifters on Earth. To continue the theme of paranoia about shapeshifters and the Dominion, "The Adversary" was instead scripted to set up a hunt for a Founder aboard the Defiant, incorporating some narrative elements at first intended to commence Season Four, while offering a more self-contained plot and using existing sets to reduce production costs.

=== Season Four: Founder infiltration and political destabilization ===
Rick Berman, Robert Hewitt Wolfe, and Ira Steven Behr originally expected to open Season Four with a two-part episode, postponed from the end of Season Three, that ultimately became "Homefront" and "Paradise Lost". Paramount determined that the writers needed to come up with a much different opener to satisfy the audience but without giving specific instructions. The production staff decided to begin a plotline based around suspicions between the Federation and the Klingons, finally leading to conflict between the former allies, which was inspired by a line from the Season Three episode "The Die is Cast". With the Klingons set to reappear, Berman suggested the return of a character from Star Trek: The Next Generation – the Klingon Worf – as a permanent officer aboard Deep Space Nine. While both the new plot and character offered interesting possibilities, the producers felt that their vision for Star Trek: Deep Space Nine was put off-course for almost one year.

Season Four begins with "The Way of the Warrior", which marks the arrival of Worf. This episode is one of a few in this season to explore themes of suspicion and paranoia and their effect upon societies and relationships, building up to "Homefront" and "Paradise Lost". After the events of "The Die is Cast", fear about the identities of the infiltrator changelings leads the Klingons to suspect Dominion involvement in the new Cardassian civilian government. Their refusal to break off an invasion, even after Dominion involvement has been disproved, results in a military confrontation and diplomatic breakdown, and the Klingons attempt to seize Deep Space Nine. This seems to further the Founders' goal of the destabilization of the Alpha Quadrant as a prelude to their own invasion.

In "Hippocratic Oath", the characters of Dr. Bashir and Chief O'Brien debate curing a group of Jem'Hadar soldiers of an addiction in the hope that they will rebel against the Dominion. There is discussion about the identity of the true enemy, the limits of duty, and whether soldiers are responsible for the actions of their leaders. "To the Death" further investigates the themes of soldier duty and loyalty, and it contrasts the opposing rules of discipline that regulate Starfleet officers and Jem'Hadar troops. In addition, this episode introduced the Vorta representative Weyoun, who would become the most prominent Vorta in the rest of the series.

In "Homefront", the mistrust generated by the shapeshifters continues, with Captain Sisko suspecting his own father and recommending a state of emergency be declared on Earth. In "Paradise Lost", some Starfleet officers go further and attempt to implement a coup d'état against the President of the Federation after it is revealed that shapeshifters have infiltrated Earth and committed a terrorist attack. This leads to an armed conflict between Starfleet vessels for the first time in a century, according to the Star Trek in-universe timeline. Sisko is able to force Admiral Leyton to abandon his efforts to impose martial law by telling him: "You're fighting the wrong war!" Behr's favorite line from the episode is "Paradise never seemed so well-armed", highlighting one of many occasions when Deep Space Nine would point out the practical issues revolving around maintaining the peaceful culture of the Federation and the moral or immoral choices made to achieve this ideal.

=== Season Five: build-up to all-out war ===
In the fifth season, the Dominion invasion of the Alpha Quadrant gathers pace, appearing in episodes such as "Apocalypse Rising", "In Purgatory's Shadow", "By Inferno's Light", and "Blaze of Glory". Robert Hewitt Wolfe and Ira Steven Behr were again responsible for the major Season Five episodes concerning the Dominion.

In the Season Five opener, "Apocalypse Rising", Odo discovers that his race is capable of deceiving their own kind, as well as "solids", when he is led to believe that Klingon Chancellor Gowron is a Changeling instead of the General, Martok. This plot was planned to shift the focus of Star Trek: Deep Space Nine episodes back toward the struggle with the Dominion, which had been postponed in earlier production discussions with Paramount in favor of bringing Worf and a Klingon-based plotline into the series.

In "In Purgatory's Shadow", it is discovered that Dr. Bashir has been kidnapped, imprisoned for weeks, and, in the interim, replaced by a Changeling. The shapeshifter double sabotages efforts to close the Wormhole and attempts to destroy the Bajoran sun, leaving the path open for Dominion fleets to enter the Alpha Quadrant. In the following episode, "By Inferno's Light", the Cardassians become a member of the Dominion, and the Federation and Klingon Empire resolve to cast aside their mutual distrust and unite against the common threat. A garrison of Klingon troops is stationed on Deep Space Nine, under the command of the real General Martok, rescued from Dominion incarceration with Bashir. In "Blaze of Glory", the characters confront the issue of ethnic cleansing when the Maquis – a resistance group of former Federation citizens now living in Cardassian space – are hunted down and ask for the assistance of Sisko, who used to criticize their methods.

The Season Five finale, "Call to Arms", sets the scene for the commencement of full-scale war between the Dominion and the Federation during the final two seasons of Deep Space Nine. When the Dominion begins to send ships through the Wormhole, the Alpha Quadrant allies build a minefield at its mouth to cut off the supply line. The plot considers whether it is better for the planet Bajor to stand with their Federation friends or remain neutral in the coming war to protect themselves. Sisko persuades them that neutrality is the favorable course.

=== Season Six: the war rages ===
Season Six, charting the turmoil of the Dominion War, faces themes of the moral dilemmas of conflict. New plot elements permitted Star Trek: Deep Space Nine to examine themes in a manner unlike preceding Star Trek productions, as characters are forced to re-evaluate their beliefs. The production staff resolved to start the season with a six-episode arc, the first attempted in the history of the Star Trek franchise.

Rick Berman originally pictured that the Dominion War would last for a limited number of episodes before a prompt resolution. Planning the arc, Ira Steven Behr, Ronald D. Moore, and the writers conceived a longer chain of first five, then six connected episodes, stretching from "A Time to Stand" to "Sacrifice of Angels", as themes increased demands for greater narrative development. No writer had previously contributed to a series involving arcs of such length, and Moore, Behr, and novice scripting partner & supervising producer Hans Beimler have all stated that the writing process changed as a result, with more production collaboration and interaction than for earlier seasons of Deep Space Nine. The potential for serialization that Rick Berman had perceived from the start of Deep Space Nine came to fruition as a result of the multiple plotlines accumulating to form the Dominion War.

The return of Gul Dukat as commander of the Dominion-controlled Deep Space Nine enabled the writers to contrast the space station of the audience's imagination to its incarnation as a former Cardassian mining facility. Former resistance fighter Major Kira is portrayed re-considering her ethical code as she sets out on the path to collaboration in "Rocks and Shoals", but the suicide of a Bajoran monk reminds her of the reality of her situation. Through "Rocks and Shoals", Deep Space Nine also revisits themes of war conduct as Sisko considers the morality of ambushing soldiers whom superiors have forsaken, only for events to force his hand. In "A Time to Stand" and "Behind the Lines", the character of Odo is torn between the trust placed in him by Kira and the Bajorans, and his status as a Founder, when he joins Deep Space Nine's Dominion council and then neglects to help his comrades at a critical moment.

Fortune is reversed again in Season Six as Starfleet re-captures Deep Space Nine in the closing episodes of the opening arc, "Favor the Bold" and "Sacrifice of Angels". The USS Defiant stands alone in an attempt to hold back thousands of Dominion ships entering through the Wormhole. An intervention from the Wormhole Prophets, considered gods by the Bajorans, leads characters to ponder questions of faith and destiny. Writer Hans Beimler wished to include mythological allusions, stating, "It's tragic hero stuff. A hero [Sisko] takes on things for others, but doesn't necessarily find any peace himself in the result." Ira Steven Behr compares Sisko to the Biblical figure Moses, who fails to reach the Promised Land, and to the character of Ethan Edwards from the Western film The Searchers (1956), who neglects to return to his family once his task is complete. It was determined that this facet to Sisko's character justified the use of divine intervention to resolve the Dominion threat: the fleet disappears and the Federation regains control of Deep Space Nine. The defeat costs Dukat his mental health, the life of his daughter, Tora Ziyal, and his status as Cardassian leader. Dukat is the first, but not the only, character in Season Six to face the pain of loss in conflict. Later, in the season six finale "Tears of the Prophets", Worf loses his wife Jadzia Dax when she is killed by Dukat.

Although themes of death are apparent in Deep Space Nine's previous seasons, "Far Beyond the Stars" details how Sisko copes with the loss of a friend on a deeper psychological level. Experiencing visions of himself confronting racial discrimination against Black Americans in the 1950s, Sisko interprets useful parallels connected to his life on Deep Space Nine. Sisko's response to the death toll of the Dominion War is re-examined in "In the Pale Moonlight".

Additionally, Season Six introduces Section 31, a secret organization dedicated to preserving the Federation's principles regardless of the cost and legitimacy of its methods. In "Inquisition", the character of Dr. Bashir refuses to join Section 31 and reports its actions, but still ponders its significance: "But what would that say about us? That we're no different than our enemies? That when push comes to shove, we're willing to throw away our principles in order to survive?" Sisko replies, "I wish I had an answer for you."

"In the Pale Moonlight" considers a similar moral dilemma when the Dominion captures an important Federation planet, Betazed, in a surprise attack. The subjugation of a planet familiar to the audience was used to heighten the sense of danger and the stakes for the characters. In this episode, Sisko fuels a conspiracy intended to improve the war situation that ultimately results in the character of Elim Garak committing murder. In the context of the Dominion War, it is resolved to conceal the truth for the greater good. Writer Michael Taylor has suggested, "It showed how Deep Space Nine could really stretch the Star Trek formula. It pushes the boundaries in a realistic way, because the decisions Sisko makes are the kinds of decisions that have to be made in war. They're for the greater good."

=== Season Seven: end of the war ===
Season Seven charts further dilemmas of conflict. Following the example of Season Six, the writers considered using an arc to conclude the multiple Dominion War threads in satisfying fashion, deciding that Star Trek: Deep Space Nine could not be concluded in one or two episodes alone. A ten-episode arc was outlined to end Season Seven, the Dominion War, and all of Deep Space Nine, and more alterations were made as scripting progressed.

Characters face issues of genocide: in "Treachery, Faith, and the Great River", Constable Odo learns of the engineered virus that Section 31 has disseminated among the Founders, and in "When It Rains..." that Section 31 has infected him to communicate the disease. While Dr. Bashir supports providing the Founders with a cure, others are unconvinced.

In “Penumbra”, it is revealed that the Dominion is receiving logistical support from the Son'a, who begin production of the Ketracel-white needed for the Jem'Hadar. Another opponent reveals itself when the Breen Confederacy signs a pact with the Dominion in "'Til Death Do Us Part". For "The Changing Face of Evil", writers Ira Steven Behr and Hans Beimler scripted a second strike against the Federation through a Breen assault on Earth. Later, with the addition of their new Breen allies, the Dominion retake the Chin'toka system, which sees the destruction of a number of Klingon, Romulan and Federation ships including the USS Defiant. Ronald D. Moore has stated: "We wanted to kill the Defiant as a statement on how tough the Breen were. We thought that would rock the characters and the audience." Behr explains that, "... the ship had become a character that had caught on in people's hearts and minds ... when the Defiant went down, that hurt."

The resurgence in the conflict provided opportunities to introduce problems such as post-conflict psychological trauma in "The Siege of AR-558" and injury when the character of Nog undergoes leg amputation in "It's Only a Paper Moon". Moore has said that the plot of this episode was agreed on after an "extended argument" between Behr and Deep Space Nine creator Rick Berman and that such discussions were a common occurrence when war casualties were considered. Michele and Duncan Barrett perceive the allusions made to the traumas of World War I.

The concept of resistance is re-opened in the context of Cardassia rather than Bajor. Legate Damar becomes more and more frustrated with the deadlocked conflict and his situation as a Dominion puppet. As Cardassian military losses mount and Dominion control of Cardassia deepens, he becomes alcoholic and criticizes the Dominion's power. Damar was originally to be revealed as a double agent for the Federation, but Moore then suggested the slave revolt of Spartacus as a model. Damar establishes an underground resistance movement, is branded a rebel, and goes into hiding. Kira, Garak, and Odo are sent as "technical advisors" to help him in "When It Rains...".

The relationship between Cardassians and Bajorans, former enemies turned allies, is charted in "Tacking Into the Wind", in which Damar and Kira's group abandon prejudice and collaborate to seize a Breen weapon. Continuing into "The Dogs of War", Damar is forced to choose between his Cardassian comrades, stubborn in their beliefs, and the support of Kira and others whom he used to consider enemies. As the tide turns against the Dominion, cut off from the Gamma Quadrant and without technological advantage, a last stand is prepared. The Female Changeling orders the destruction of a metropolis, Lakarian City, to coerce the Cardassians back into line, but, instead, the Cardassian fleet defects, passing the advantage to the Alpha Quadrant alliance. Consequently, an attempted extermination results in the deaths of 800 million Cardassians in a Dominion bombardment.

Allusions to genocide contrast with ethical discussion concerning the engineered "Founders disease" and a potential cure. In "Extreme Measures", the characters of Dr. Bashir and Chief O'Brien locate a treatment inside the mind of Section 31 agent Luther Sloan. A moral debate ensues on what constitutes genocide. While Bashir supports offering a cure to the Founders, Sisko determines that the disease should be left to continue crippling the powerful opposition. However, in "The Dogs of War", Odo declares that this amounts to genocide of his species and is handed a treatment by Bashir. In return for the Dominion's peaceful surrender, and the arrest of the Female Changeling on charges of war crimes, the Alpha Quadrant alliance permits Odo to heal the rest of his people.

The Treaty of Bajor is signed aboard Deep Space Nine in the Season Seven finale, "What You Leave Behind, Part II". The conclusion to the Dominion War arc formed the resolution to Deep Space Nine as a series, and a moment for the production staff to settle the destinies of the main characters. Berman and Behr agreed with Paramount that the final episode of the series should concentrate on human drama rather than the endgame of the Dominion War. Moore opines the production staff succeeded in ensuring the Dominion War acted as a means of deepening characterization. Although further plots would have been scripted had Deep Space Nine continued into an eighth season, Behr accepted the resolution of the Dominion War at the end of Season Seven.

=== After the War ===
The state of the Dominion as a political entity at the conclusion of the war has never been fully discussed in Star Trek canon. The terms of the final treaty ending the war were never shown. At the conclusion of the war, it is assumed that the Dominion still held vast territories in the Gamma Quadrant. Odo's return to the Great Link is partially intended to share with the other changelings the information he has about how the war concluded and what he knows from living with solids; presumably, this is to change the goals and tactics of the Founders to a system that coexists with the solids as opposed to a strategy of domination.

However, through Odo's sharing of intelligence with him, Worf reveals in the Star Trek: Picard episode "Seventeen Seconds" that the Founders were split on the question of whether to cooperate with the Federation in upholding the treaty, or take up revenge. The renegade faction wanting revenge is revealed to have stolen key technologies from the Federation's Daystrom Institute. This information is kept quiet in the fears of the Dominion War being restarted. The leader of the faction, Vadic, later tells Jean-Luc Picard that she had been a prisoner of war during the Dominion War and experimented upon by Federation scientists, resulting in Vadic and her followers gaining enhanced abilities. This, combined with the devastation her people had faced during the war from the Section 31 virus, had led Vadic to ally herself with the Borg for revenge. Vadic and most of her forces are killed during a failed attempt to hijack the USS Titan-A. Following the defeat of the Borg, Beverly Crusher is able to figure out a way to detect the remaining Founder infiltrators throughout Starfleet, leading to their exposure and arrest. Starfleet also discovers that many of the officers that the Founders had replaced, including Captain Tuvok, are still alive and rescue them.

In the non-canon relaunch novels published by Pocket Books, it is revealed that the Dominion and Breen forces withdraw from Cardassian space. Through Odo's efforts, the Dominion permits visitors from the Alpha Quadrant to resume peaceful operations in the Gamma Quadrant in exchange for leaving its territory alone. Odo then begins attempting to change the nature of the Dominion by convincing the Founders to re-evaluate their views on other species, as well as encouraging certain Vorta and Jem'Hadar to behave more independently. The allied powers begin coordinating relief efforts to Cardassia, using Bajor as a staging point. The Cardassian Union is divided into separate protectorates to be occupied by the allies while the Cardassians recover. For her part in orchestrating the war, the Female Founder is sentenced to life imprisonment at Ananke Alpha, a maximum security Federation prison.

== Reception ==
=== Former cast members and production staff ===
In a 2007 interview with iF magazine, George Takei, who played Hikaru Sulu in Star Trek: The Original Series and its films, described Star Trek: Deep Space Nine as representing the "polar opposite" of Gene Roddenberry's vision and philosophy of the future. Writer D. C. Fontana has stated in an interview that Roddenberry would have admired the later series for its dark themes, referring to Roddenberry's military service record in World War II.

Roddenberry doubted that a series concentrating on themes aside from space exploration could endure, and voiced displeasure with initial concepts for Deep Space Nine presented to him in 1991. Rick Berman has explained that Roddenberry, although terminally ill, had given him his blessing for its development, but that he had no opportunity to discuss any of the ideas with Roddenberry.

=== Critical reception ===
John J. O'Connor, writing for The New York Times in January 1993, noted that pre-release advertisements for Star Trek: Deep Space Nine offered "a new Star Trek era" and added, "Welcome to the Dark Side. The determinedly optimistic Mr. Roddenberry was partial to plots that made uplifting moral points. The new creators and executive producers, Rick Berman and Michael Piller, are shooting, so to speak, for something more ambivalent, less perfect." In September 1996, before the start of Season Four, O'Connor was not sure the series was tackling contemporary themes adequately. He wrote, "Inevitably, though, there is an element of exhaustion seeping through the concept. With the Cold War over, perhaps the Roddenberry optimism seems merely naive as headlines bring news of murderous divisions between Serbs and Muslims, Kurds and Turks, Israelis and Palestinians, Irish Catholics and Protestants, and so on across an increasingly depressing globe. Star Trek offered a vision that leapt 300 years into the future. For too many people today, three years would seem a stretch."

Cynthia Littleton, writing for Variety in 1998, summarized the ratings the series was receiving at the end of its sixth season: "Deep Space Nine may not go out on as high a Nielsen note as Next Generation, which wrapped a hugely successful run in 1994, but DS9 is hardly floundering. The series, which bowed in January 1993, consistently ranks among the top three first-run syndication hours in household and demographic ratings."

In a 1999 edition of the Australian science-fiction magazine Frontier, Anthony Leong suggested that Deep Space Nine had not initially been envisaged to include a war story arc from the beginning. He demonstrated a preference for how the plot of Babylon 5 had been devised, while acknowledging how the Deep Space Nine writers had developed a continuing plotline: "... it is rare for a series creator to envision how the series will develop over time. Furthermore, the creative process in dramatic television writing tends to be organic, as events in the series will unfold based on the events that preceded it. For example, were the wars with the Klingons and the Dominion on Deep Space Nine foreseen by its creators back in the first season? Of course not ... these events developed over time through the input of its writing staff."

In 2008, Nader Elhefnawy, contributor to The Internet Review of Science Fiction, asserted that, while less appreciated than other science-fiction series of the 1990s, Deep Space Nine had developed an interesting cast of characters, "thanks to the Dominion War, much of the richest and most exciting drama in the Star Trek franchise's history."

Owen Williams, writing for Empire magazine, opines that Star Trek as a whole has been slow to adapt and develop to new trends, while singling out Deep Space Nine for special mention: "... arguably even the ace DS9 only got good in response to Babylon 5 ..." Adam Smith, chief features writer for Empire commented in a 2009 article that, "It's hard to choose the best episodes of DS9 without mentioning the stories involving the Dominion War." He reported "The Search", "In the Pale Moonlight" and "Far Beyond the Stars" as the features staff's favorite episodes for their portrayal of darker themes and creating a change in direction.

Star Trek: Deep Space Nine was nominated at the Academy of Science Fiction, Fantasy & Horror Films for a Saturn Award, from 1997 to 2000, in Best Genre Cable or Syndicated Series. It was nominated in technical and artistic categories at the Emmys in each season. Cinescape columnist Andrew Hershberger remarked in 2003 on the lack of critical success for science-fiction television: "Nobody cool would dare vote for a sci-fi show [for Outstanding Drama Series] that didn't have [Stanley] Kubrick or Chris Carter's name attached to it ... If Deep Space Nine was involved, you'd hear some real complaining on this end."

In 2016, a reviewer at The Washington Post applauded the Dominion War saga for being the "richest narrative in the entire [Star Trek] universe."

=== Academic perspectives ===
Academics have noted how the Dominion War plotlines have explored the human psyche as much as outer space. Lincoln Geraghty praises the ending to the story arc and Star Trek: Deep Space Nine as a series, and believes this is indicative of how the series manipulates the Star Trek ethos, identifying a theme of ambiguity as part of its continuing narrative. Karin Blair, writing in 1997 at the time of Season Five, felt that the series was reflecting trends for American culture to re-consider its place in the global community. Michele and Duncan Barrett comment on the "declining faith in rationalism that haunts Deep Space Nine" in their book Star Trek: The Human Frontier.

In contrast, Robert Jewett and John Shelton Lawrence, authors of The Myth of the American Superhero, argue that the Dominion War plotlines in Deep Space Nine continue Star Trek's portrayal of "humanistic militarism", in that conflict is justified for the sake of humanity. Criticism is levelled at Paramount's tie-in merchandising, in particular the slogan for the computer game Deep Space Nine: Dominion Wars, which is considered to emphasize the combat element at the expense of other themes.

While television commentators and fans have noted associations with the Yugoslav Wars in the 1990s, some academics have noted parallels between the portrayal of the Dominion War and other historical conflicts. Michele and Duncan Barrett identify a number of themes relating to World War I in Star Trek, especially "in the bleak and costly alliances and endless casualty sheets that characterize the protracted Dominion War in DS9."

== Tie-in media ==
A number of tie-in media titles have expanded on the Dominion War well beyond events depicted in the Deep Space Nine television series:

=== Novels ===
The Mirror Universe version of the Dominion appears in David Alan Mack's novel Star Trek: Section 31 - Disavowed, published in 2014. The mirror Dominion is much like the regular universe's version, except that the mirror Founders are much less authoritarian and are even subject to Dominion law.

==== The Dominion War (1998) ====
Star Trek: The Dominion War crossover miniseries explores events leading up to the Dominion War. Two novels focus on the crew of the USS Enterprise. A Call to Arms (1998) and Sacrifice of Angels (1998) are based on seven interlinked episodes from Deep Space Nine's fifth and sixth seasons, beginning with "Call to Arms". The Battle for Betazed (2002), by Charlotte Douglas and Susan Kearney, and Tales of the Dominion War (2004), a short story collection edited by Keith DeCandido, tie in to the series.

No.	Title	Author(s)	Date	ISBN
1	Behind Enemy Lines (The Next Generation)	John Vornholt	November 1998	0-671-02499-X
2	Call to Arms (Deep Space Nine)	Diane Carey	November 1998	0-671-02497-3
3	Tunnel Through the Stars (The Next Generation)	John Vornholt	December 1998	0-671-02500-7
4	Sacrifice of Angels (Deep Space Nine)	Diane Carey	December 1998	0-671-02498-1

==== Millennium (2000) ====
Star Trek: Deep Space Nine – Millennium miniseries explores an alternate-timeline accidentally created by the crew of the USS Defiant (NX-74205). The series was partially adapted as The Fallen (2000). An omnibus edition was published in 2002.

No.	Title	Author(s)	Date	ISBN
1	The Fall of Terok Nor	Judith and Garfield Reeves-Stevens	March 2000	0-671-02401-9
2	The War of the Prophets	Judith and Garfield Reeves-Stevens	March 2000	0-671-02402-7
3	Inferno	Judith and Garfield Reeves-Stevens	April 2000	0-671-02403-5

==== Mission Gamma (2002) ====
Star Trek: Deep Space Nine – Mission Gamma miniseries follows the exploits of the USS Defiant (NX-74205), under the command of Elias Vaughn. These Haunted Seas (2008) collected Twilight and This Gray Spirit.

No.	Title	Author(s)	Date	ISBN
1	Twilight	David R. George III	August 27, 2002	0-7434-4560-0
2	This Gray Spirit	Heather Jarman	August 27, 2002	0-7434-4562-7
3	Cathedral	Michael A. Martin and Andy Mangels	October 1, 2002	0-7434-4564-3
4	Lesser Evil	Robert Simpson	October 29, 2002	0-7434-1024-6

==== Worlds of Deep Space Nine (2004–05) ====
Worlds of Star Trek: Deep Space Nine explores the worlds featured in the Deep Space Nine television series. Characters featured during the Dominion War arc, are peppered throughout the novellas, especially in the third volume. The concept for the series was developed by Marco Palmieri.

No.	Title	Author(s)	Date	ISBN
1	Cardassia and Andor	Una McCormack and Heather Jarman	May 25, 2004	0-7434-8351-0
2	Trill and Bajor	Andy Mangels, Michael A. Martin, and J. Noah Kym	January 25, 2005	0-7434-8352-9
3	Ferenginar and The Dominion	Keith DeCandido and David R. George III	January 25, 2005	0-7434-8353-7

==== Gamma (2017) ====
Star Trek: Deep Space Nine – Gamma miniseries follows the crew of USS Robinson (NCC-71842), under the command of Benjamin Sisko. Only one novel has been published. Not to be confused with the Mission Gamma (2002) miniseries which has a similar premise.

Title	Author(s)	Date	ISBN
Original Sin	David R. George III	September 26, 2017	978-1-5011-3322-0

=== Video games ===
==== The Fallen (2000) ====
Star Trek: Deep Space Nine – The Fallen (2000) is a third-person shooter video game loosely based on the Millennium trilogy of novels by Judith and Garfield Reeves-Stevens. Characters introduced during the Dominion War story arc appear in the game.

Title	Developer	Publisher	Released
The Fallen	The Collective	Simon & Schuster	November 23, 2000

==== Dominion Wars (2001) ====
Star Trek: Deep Space Nine – Dominion Wars (2001) is a real-time strategy video game set during the later seasons of Deep Space Nine. The player is tasked with defending Federation assets against attacking Dominion forces.

Title	Developer	Publisher	Released
Dominion Wars	Gizmo Games	Simon & Schuster	June 2, 2001

==== Others ====
The Dominion is seen in the Star Trek: Armada video game. The first mission in the Federation campaign has the USS Enterprise-E defend a starbase from rogue Jem'Hadar ships. Later, the game had a Borg armada invade Dominion space to capture a cloning facility to resurrect Locutus of Borg as a clone of Jean-Luc Picard. They are seen to have two types of ships in the game, destroyers and battleships.

The Dominion also make an appearance in Star Trek: Conquest as one of the major races and have three ship types: a Jem'Hadar Scout, a Jem'Hadar Cruiser and a Jem'Hadar Battleship.

The Star Trek Online game also features appearances by the Dominion, including several playable Dominion ships and characters. It continues the story of the Dominion fleet lost in the wormhole, the changeling Laas and the fate of the Founder leader after the Dominion War. The lost fleet was flung into the future and immediately began assaulting the Alpha Quadrant, unaware the war already concluded years before. The Female Changeling is released from prison briefly, to convince the armada to stop their assault and accept the peace treaty. The 2018 expansion Victory is Life introduces Jem'hadar as a playable race, and shows the Dominion (represented by the changeling character Odo) fighting a losing war with the hur'q, an alien species with connections to Klingon history.
