= Breen (Star Trek) =

Alien race in Star Trek franchise

- Star Trek race
- Thot Gor, a Breen official from an episode of Star Trek: Deep Space Nine
- First appearance: "Indiscretion"; Star Trek: Deep Space Nine; 1995

In-universe information
- Quadrant: Alpha
- Home world: Breen
- Language: Breen
- Affiliation: Breen Confederacy; Dominion

The Breen are a fictional extraterrestrial species featured in the Star Trek science fiction franchise. They were first mentioned in "The Loss", a fourth-season episode of Star Trek: The Next Generation which first aired in 1990. References to them were made in several other Next Generation episodes, but they did not appear until the 1996 fourth season Star Trek: Deep Space Nine episode "Indiscretion". On Deep Space Nine, they played a significant role in the final story arc of the series in 1999, during which much information about them was revealed. The Breen's true appearance remained unknown to viewers until the 2024 fifth season of Star Trek: Discovery episode "Mirrors" while flashing back to reveal the history of the character L’ak.

== Production history ==
The Breen were first mentioned in "The Loss", a fourth-season episode of Star Trek: The Next Generation which first aired in 1990. The episode established their race as one of several alien species to be unreadable by empaths, much like the Ferengi. References to them were made in several other Next Generation ("Hero Worship" in the fifth season) and Star Trek: Voyager episodes but they were not seen until the 1996 Deep Space Nine episode "Indiscretion", which aired as part of that show's fourth season. They were depicted as running a mining facility from which Gul Dukat and Major Kira rescued Dukat's daughter, Tora Ziyal. According to DS9 writer/producer Robert Hewitt Wolfe, after having previously been treated as red herrings since their first mention on Next Generation, and as a running joke by the production staff because "they were these people who were out there who were dangerous but were never really responsible for any of the trouble going on", they would finally be used as the villains in an episode. Their true appearance would be concealed beneath masks, according to writer/producer Ira Steven Behr, because "I wasn't really in the mood to come up with a new alien race. So I said, 'Let's not see them. Let's just put them in costume because they normally live in the cold.'"

The look of the Breen masks, which includes a "snout", was derived from the visual suggestion that they are a snouted species, like an Arctic wolf. The Breen costumes were problematic for the actors playing them, since they made both seeing and breathing difficult: there was only a single small hole in the beak, about eight inches from the actor's nose, according to stand-in and stunt double Todd Slayton, who played Thot Gor. The costumes also included big, clumsy boots, and the outfits were layered like an armadillo, making movement difficult. The helmets, which were complicated to put on and remove, were held together with magnets, and they were prone to falling off when someone bumped into them. The switches for the lights on the helmets were inside the helmets, requiring the actor to remove the helmet to turn the lights on and off. For reasons unknown to production personnel, the nine-volt batteries that powered the lights lasted only minutes.

In keeping with the Breen as a mysterious race, the sounds of the Breen's speech were inspired by the Lou Reed album Metal Machine Music, which the post-production sound staff were instructed to listen to when creating the electronic cackle that served as the Breen's voices.

== History and culture ==
The Breen homeworld is called Breen, according to the 1999 Star Trek: Deep Space Nine episode "'Til Death Do Us Part", and was said to be a frozen wasteland in "Indiscretion". However, in the 1999 episode "The Changing Face of Evil", it was stated by Weyoun that it is in fact rather temperate. Among the Breen, pregnancy at a young age was a common occurrence, according to "Elogium", a 1995 second season Star Trek: Voyager episode, though it has not been established what is considered "young" in the Breen culture. The Breen have no blood. How the functions normally carried out by blood in other species are carried out in Breen physiology has not been revealed. Although the Breen diet is unknown, Lieutenant Commander Worf and Ezri Dax were given algae paste when they were prisoners of the Breen in "'Til Death Do Us Part".

Historically, the Klingons were among the first to discover the consequences of underestimating the Breen. As revealed in "'Til Death Do Us Part", during the Klingon Second Empire, Chancellor Mow'ga ordered an entire fleet of Klingon warships to invade and conquer the Breen homeworld. The fleet never returned and was never heard from again. The Romulans have a saying: "Never turn your back on a Breen". This adage was first stated (and illustrated) in the 1997 fifth season Deep Space Nine episode "By Inferno's Light", in which a captive Breen grabbed a disruptor pistol from the holster of a Dominion guard, whose back was turned to him in a Dominion asteroid prison, and used it to disintegrate two Dominion guards at the same time as one of them killed the captive. The Breen in question had not done anything besides sit quietly up until that point, giving no indication that he would be a threat.

The Breen established the isolated Breen Confederacy in the Alpha Quadrant (the quadrant of the Milky Way in which Earth is located, as well as the homeworlds of the Ferengi, Cardassians, and portions of the Klingon Empire and Romulan Star Empire). The Breen established outposts near the Black Cluster, according to the 1992 fifth season Next Generation episode "Hero Worship". They also established mining facilities consisting of Breen guards and slaves kidnapped from spaceships, such as Tora Ziyal, the half-Bajoran daughter of the Cardassian Gul Dukat, whose ship, the Ravinok, had crashed on the planet Dozaria, which was controlled by the Breen, as established in "Indiscretion".

In "Hero Worship" it is mentioned that they have always been politically nonaligned. They later become a powerful ally of the Dominion, a Gamma Quadrant empire, during the Dominion War that was fought during the final two seasons of Deep Space Nine. The Breen were revealed to have allied with the Dominion in "’Til Death Do Us Part", the second episode of the nine-episode story arc that served as the final story arc of Deep Space Nine in 1999. After this occurred, the Breen attacked Earth, destroying parts of San Francisco before being repulsed. They also proved a powerful foe during the Battle of Chin'toka, in which they fought alongside the Cardassians and Dominion against an alliance of the Federation, the Klingon Empire and the Romulan Star Empire. During this battle, the Breen helped destroy a fleet of the alliance's ships, including the USS Defiant. The Breen also assumed great responsibility in military matters. The leading representatives of the Breen Confederacy, called "Thots" (which Damar, leader of the Cardassian military, compares to his own rank of Legate, in the episode “Strange Bedfellows”), such as Thot Gor and Thot Pran, were given more powers, much to the bitterness of Damar, whose own people had earlier joined the Dominion. This was one of the factors which led to Damar changing sides and leading a rebellion to free Cardassia. After the Cardassians turned against the Dominion, the Dominion and the Breen were defeated in the Battle of Cardassia Prime in Deep Space Nine's series finale, "What You Leave Behind".

In the Star Trek: Lower Decks season 3 episode "Trusted Sources," the USS Cerritos encountered Breen occupying the planet Brekka while on a second contact mission. Three Breen interceptors attacked the California-class starship which proved to be no match for them. However, the Cerritos was saved by the automated Texas-class starship USS Aledo which quickly destroyed the Breen starships. In "The Stars at Night," Vice Admiral Les Buenamigo revealed that he was well aware that the Breen were on Brekka and had set up the Cerritos so that Buenamigo would have an excuse to unveil his Texas-class ships.

In Star Trek: Discovery season 5, the Breen have become the Breen Imperium by 3191 and are mentioned to be fighting over a new leader. Captain Rayner of Starfleet expresses concern that the Breen could pose a threat to the Federation. In a possible future witnessed by Rayner and Michael Burnham, the Breen were sold the technology of the Progenitors by L'ak and Moll and they used it to destroy the Federation. In "Mirrors," it's revealed that L'ak himself is actually a Breen and is described as being of royal blood. L'ak, who was considered an outcast despite being the nephew of the Ruhn Primarch of the Sixth Flight, had abandoned his people after falling in love with Moll. For betraying his people, L'ak has an Erigah on him, a blood bounty, and he and Moll hope that the Progenitors' technology will be enough to get the Breen to release the bounty on him. In addition, the Breen are shown to have two forms under their suits: a solid humanoid form that the Primarch claims they have evolved beyond and makes them weak to use, and a fluid form that the Primarch refers to as the Breen's true face. However, L'ak believes that both forms are actually one half of them, and that the Breen are in effect rejecting half of themselves. It's later revealed that six Breen Primarchs, including Ruhn and Tahal, are at war for the Breen throne. L'ak—as the last direct descendant of the Breen Emperor—is a crucial political pawn, as whoever controls him holds legitimacy in the war for the throne. It's also revealed that Rayner's homeworld was occupied by forces led by Tahal who killed Rayner's family for resisting the occupation.

After Moll and L'ak are captured by the Federation, Ruhn demands that they be turned over to him while Burnham recognizes Ruhn's dreadnaught as the ship that she saw in the future that had destroyed the Federation. In the middle of negotiations, L'ak injects himself with an overdose of stimulants in order to create a distraction for Moll to escape, but he misjudges the dosage and gives himself a fatal injection despite the best efforts of Dr. Hugh Culber and a Breen medic to save his life. As a result, Ruhn threatens war on the Federation, but Moll, revealing herself to be L'ak's wife, offers up the Progenitors' technology to Ruhn which would allow him to win his war with the other Primarchs by force. The Discovery crew deduces that Moll is hoping to use the Progenitors' technology to resurrect L'ak and is using the Breen to do it, now leaving the Breen and the Federation in a race against each other.

Moll subsequently uses Ruhn's dishonor and lust for power above all else to instigate a mutiny against him. Moll kills Ruhn and takes control of his forces with the intention to resurrect L'ak and place him on the throne of the Breen Imperium. Learning about this, Tahal attempts to seize Ruhn's forces for herself, but Federation Ambassador Saru intercepts Tahal's fleet using the Federation's new pathway drive and coerces her into standing down. Finding a structure containing a portal to the technology close to binary prime black holes, the dreadnaught seizes it, forcing a Discovery away team to sneak aboard the ship in replicated Breen refrigeration suits and steal it. Moll and Burnham enter the portal before Discovery rams the Breen shuttlebay, inflicting heavy damage upon the dreadnaught and casting the portal back into space.

During a final battle for control of the technology, it's discovered that L'ak cannot be resurrected by it. Unable to destroy the dreadnaught, Rayner instead uses Discovery's spore drive to send it and a scout ship sent by Tahal to the galactic barrier. While both ships survive the jump, it will take them a couple of decades to return.

=== Non-canonical information ===
In Zero Sum Game, the first novel in the 2010–2012 series Star Trek: Typhon Pact, writer David Alan Mack establishes that the Breen Confederacy is made up of many separate species, all of which wear suits to disguise their respective appearances and present as a unified Breen identity. The known Breen species are:

- The Amoniri, whose bodies have no blood and which require refrigeration in their suits to survive
- The Fenrisal, whose pronounced snouts give shape to the traditional Breen helmet
- The Paclu, who have four-lobed brains that cannot be read by most telepathic species
- The Silwaan, whose appearance is most humanlike of the Breen subspecies
- The Vironat, a gray-skinned multi-limbed species (introduced in the sixth novel in the series, Plagues of Night by David R. George III)

== Technology and equipment ==
In "Scorpion", 1997 the third-season finale of Star Trek: Voyager, Lieutenant Tuvok states that the Breen use organic technology in their ships when discussing the bio-organic starships of Species 8472. Their ships are armed with cloaking devices and disruptor-type weapons, according to "Hero Worship".

In Star Trek Generations Riker mentions the Breen as one of only three species with access to Type-III hand-held disruptors.

During the Battle of Chin'toka, a Dominion War battle that occurred in the episode "The Changing Face of Evil", the Breen employ an energy-damping weapon that could shut down all systems on Alliance ships. The Klingons subsequently discover an engine modification that renders Klingon ships immune to this weapon, though it does not work on Federation or Romulan ships since they are powered differently. The Breen used this weapon to great effect, completely immobilizing the USS Defiant, and a fleet of alliance ships, allowing the Breen to destroy them at their leisure.

The helmet of the Breen suits consists of a visor that either glows green, or has small green and red lights on it, and a detachable "beak". The Breen's suits come in two types. The first is a standard suit that is worn by most of the Breen. The second is a more ornate version worn by Thots or other officials that has gold lining and distinctive gold stripes running down the top of the helmet and the "beak", as seen in later episodes of Deep Space Nine, such as "Strange Bedfellows".

In an alternate timeline witnessed in the "Face the Strange" episode of Star Trek: Discovery's fifth season, the Breen were sold the technology of the Progenitors, a race that had seeded the galaxy with humanoid life, and they used it to wipe out the Federation.

In Star Trek: Discovery's fifth season, the Breen have massive dreadnaught-class ships with shields so powerful that they can block the Federation's scanners.

The non-canonical book Legends of the Ferengi claims that the Ferengi were sold warp technology by a Breen they called "the Masked Breen" (because they did not know the Breen all wore masks). In return, they gave the Breen both poles of Ferenginar (the Ferengi homeworld), several comets, and a frozen moon.

== Reception ==
In June 2014, Charlie Jane Anders, writing for io9, ranked the Breen as the tenth least threatening villains of Star Trek, calling them "one of the bigger letdowns of Star Trek". Anders cited how the race was built up as a supposedly formidable race, with an energy-dampening weapon that disabled enemy ships, only for the Federation to quickly devise a countermeasure to it, after which the Breen's status as opponents faded.
