= USS Defiant =

Star Trek starships

- The USS Defiant NX-74205
- First appearance: First: "The Search" (1994) (Deep Space Nine); Second: "The Dogs of War" (1999) (Deep Space Nine)
- Last appearance: First: "The Changing Face of Evil" (1999) (Deep Space Nine); Second: "The Bounty" (2023) (Picard)

Information
- Affiliation: United Federation of Planets; Starfleet
- Launched: First: 2370; Second: 2375

General characteristics
- Class: Defiant
- Registry: NX-74205 (as the first Defiant); NCC-75633 (as the second Defiant, originally the USS São Paulo)
- Armaments: Pulsed and beam phasers; Photon torpedoes; Quantum torpedoes
- Defenses: Deflector shields; Cloaking device; Ablative armor
- Maximum speed: Warp factor 9.5 (Upgraded 2371)
- Propulsion: Impulse drive; Warp drive; RCS Thrusters
- Length: 170 metres (560 ft)
- Width: 134 metres (440 ft)
- Height: 30 metres (98 ft)

The USS Defiant is the name of two starships in the Star Trek media franchise, most notably featured in the television series Star Trek: Deep Space Nine (1993–1999) and the film Star Trek: First Contact (1996). Introduced in Deep Space Nine's third season, it is a warship attached to the show's eponymous space station. The original Defiant is destroyed during the Dominion War in the seventh season and replaced with a sister ship.

The Defiant was designed by Jim Martin, Gary Hutzel and Tony Meinger.

== Design and development ==
For the first two seasons of Deep Space Nine, stories requiring characters to travel off-station typically involved small runabout vessels. Producer Ira Steven Behr and writer Robert Hewitt Wolfe believed runabouts would be insufficient to confront the adversarial Dominion introduced in the second season, and they convinced executive producer Rick Berman of the need for a new ship. Additionally, the Defiant was intended to solve the problem of cramped runabout sets.

The Defiant was initially designed by art illustrator Jim Martin, with contributions from visual effects supervisor Gary Hutzel and modelmaker Tony Meininger. Original designs called for a "beefed-up" runabout-type ship, but this gave way to a full-fledged starship design initially called Valiant. This name was dropped out of fear that it would conflict with Star Trek: Voyager's titular starship, also beginning with a "V".

An early screenplay for Star Trek: First Contact (1996) called for the Defiant to be destroyed, but Behr objected and the idea was dropped.

Following the Defiant's destruction in "The Changing Face of Evil", the writers had wanted a new type of successor ship but the budget was not available. As a result, they replaced the Defiant with the same spacecraft design for the USS São Paulo in "The Dogs of War". Ron Moore said in the Star Trek: Deep Space Nine Companion that the new ship was intended to be designated "Defiant-A", but it would have been too costly to redo the CG model for one episode because stock shots from earlier episodes had to be used as well for budgetary reasons.

== Depiction ==
Commander Benjamin Sisko, as a survivor of the Battle of Wolf 359, became involved in the effort to create countermeasures for the next encounter with the Borg. He was part of the team which designed the Defiant, which unlike most Starfleet ships, is built for combat rather than science and exploration. The prototype Defiant was then built at a shipyard that Sisko was in charge of. However the ship experienced some problems in testing due to it being extremely high-powered for a vessel of its size. This issue along with a slowly receding urgency with regards to the Borg threat, led to the prototype being placed in storage instead of being commissioned.

Several years later, following the disastrous First Contact with the Dominion, Sisko requested the Defiant be removed from storage and assigned to his command for the mission to make contact with the Dominion in the show's third-season premiere.

The Defiant remains attached to Deep Space Nine under Sisko's command for the remainder of the series, carrying the crew on missions beyond the space station. It appears briefly in Star Trek: First Contact under the command of Worf where it's left badly damaged and the crew has to evacuate to the Enterprise-E after life support fails. The Breen destroy the Defiant during the show's finale arc. Starfleet gives Sisko command of a new ship of the same class, the USS Sao Paulo, of which he is given special dispensation to change the name and registry to be the same as the previous Defiant. The Defiant is seen briefly in the Star Trek: Picard third season episode "The Bounty", out-of-commission and docked at Starfleet's Fleet Museum. It is also amongst the ships that fall under the control of the living construct in Star Trek: Prodigy's two-part season one finale "Supernova."

The Defiant also appears in numerous spin-off books, comics, and video games.

== Reception ==
The USS Defiant is noted as a powerful spacecraft vessel of the Star Trek science fiction universe in the late 24th century. CBR compared the maneuverable and powerful Defiant to the Millennium Falcon. Space.com also noted the Defiant as one of the more agile science fiction spacecraft, compared to some of the slower, almost-nautical movement of larger spacecraft of Star Trek.

The moment when Sisko decloaks the Defiant spacecraft for the first time in "The Search" was rated by Geek.com in 2015 as one of the top 35 moments in Star Trek; they said it marked a "great start" to the third season of Deep Space Nine. The addition of the Defiant helped the show dig deeper into stories set in the Gamma Quadrant, as well as the long war-saga arc of the show's later seasons.

A miniature model of the USS Defiant sold for 106,000 USD in 2006 at auction.
