= Dukat (Star Trek) =

Character in Star Trek: Deep Space Nine

Gul Dukat
- Star Trek character
- First appearance: "Emissary" (1993)
- Last appearance: "What You Leave Behind" (1999)
- Portrayed by: Marc Alaimo

In-universe information
- Species: Cardassian
- Affiliation: Cardassian Union; Pah Wraiths (after "Tears of the Prophets")
- Posting: Kornaire; Prefect of Bajor/Overseer of the Cardassian Occupation; Terok Nor commanding officer Commanding officer of the Second Order; Cardassia Prime; Chief military advisor to the Detapa Council; Groumall commanding officer Leader of the Cardassian Union; Emissary of the Pah-Wraiths
- Rank: Gul; Legate (demoted)

Dukat is a character from the television series Star Trek: Deep Space Nine. A member of the Cardassian species, he is introduced as the former overseer of the series' namesake space station but goes on to become the leader of his species' governing body, the Cardassian Union. At times an enemy, while at others an ally of Benjamin Sisko, Dukat appears in 35 of the series' 176 episodes. He was portrayed by Marc Alaimo throughout. Dukat became a fan favorite among Star Trek fans and he is widely considered to be one of the most iconic villains in the Star Trek franchise.

== Creation and role ==
The Cardassians were introduced to the Star Trek universe in the Next Generation episode "The Wounded". In that episode, Marc Alaimo played a Cardassian named Macet, who bears some similarities to Dukat. According to the 2001 novel Demons of Air and Darkness, Macet and Dukat (whose first name is identified as Skrain) are cousins.

Dukat played a versatile role throughout the series and was often a nuanced character. Deep Space Nine co-executive producer Ronald D. Moore said: "I don't think of him as being completely evil through and through ... He can be charming. He can be generous. He can do the right thing. All of that somehow makes his 'evil' actions all the more despicable, because we know that there was the potential in there for him to be a better person." Ultimately, despite the character's occasional potential for good, Moore said "Dukat is a bad guy. A very bad guy." He is described in StarTrek.com as "the most complex and fully developed villain in Star Trek history".

== Appearances ==
Prior to the start of the series, Dukat held the military title of Legate (Admiral) and was the head of the Cardassian occupation government of the planet Bajor as well as commander of the Cardassian-built station originally named Terok Nor (which would become known as Deep Space Nine under the Federation). When the Cardassians are forced to withdraw, he is demoted to Gul (equivalent to Captain). Due to this background, Dukat's early appearances range from being anti-heroic to antagonistic. In his debut appearance in the pilot episode "Emissary", he takes a Cardassian warship to Deep Space Nine to demand from the new Starfleet-appointed commander Benjamin Sisko one of the recently discovered Orbs of the Bajoran Prophets.

In "Cardassians", Dukat is at the center of a conspiracy which his exiled Cardassian enemy Elim Garak and Dr. Julian Bashir are trying to unravel. In "Civil Defense" he tries to blackmail the crew of Deep Space Nine when they cannot disarm an accidentally-triggered Cardassian counter-insurgency program. He is allied with the main Starfleet characters against the Maquis rebels in "The Maquis" and "Defiant", and against the Klingons when they invade Cardassia in "The Way of the Warrior".

In the season four episode "Indiscretion", Kira Nerys accompanies Gul Dukat on a search for a lost Cardassian starship, where it is revealed he is trying to track down and kill his illegitimate half-Bajoran daughter Tora Ziyal. He ultimately resolves to take her home with him. The follow-up episode "Return to Grace" shows Dukat being disgraced with the Cardassian military as a result of this move, reduced to commanding a freighter with Ziyal and his deputy Damar. With Kira's help, Dukat commandeers a Klingon Bird Of Prey and sends his government their battle plans. When he hears that the Cardassian government still wants to negotiate with the Klingons, he decides to use his new ship to launch a one-man war against the Klingon Empire, leaving Ziyal with Kira at Deep Space Nine. In this capacity he helps Sisko, Miles O'Brien, Odo and Worf infiltrate the Klingon Empire in the season five premiere "Apocalypse Rising".

Dukat's character returned to being a more antagonistic role in season five's "By Inferno's Light", where he is revealed to have negotiated Cardassia's joining the Dominion, becoming head of the Union's government in the process. He leads an invasion force which recaptures Deep Space Nine in the season finale "Call to Arms", effectively starting the Dominion War and retaking his old command.

Dukat loses the station again in the sixth season episode "Sacrifice of Angels", where Damar kills Ziyal in retaliation for having helped the Federation. Mentally broken, Dukat is easily captured by Starfleet. He escapes their custody when he and Sisko are marooned in "Waltz", during which Dukat experiences hallucinations of Kira, Damar and Weyoun, comes to accept his hatred for the Bajorans, and swears vengeance on all Bajor before escaping. Toward this end, Dukat allies himself with—and is for a short time possessed by—the Pah-wraiths, arch-enemies of the Bajoran Prophets, and renders the latter's Orbs useless, killing series character Jadzia Dax in "Tears of the Prophets".

Dukat returns in season seven at the head of the cult of the Pah-wraiths in "Covenant", but he is quickly disgraced in front of his followers by Kira and goes into hiding again. In "Penumbra", he seeks Damar's help to find a surgeon to make him look like a Bajoran. In this guise, he convinces Kai Winn to join him in his efforts to free the Pah-wraiths from their imprisonment in the Bajoran Fire Caves in "Strange Bedfellows", even when she discovers his true identity in "The Changing Face of Evil." Their plan is put into action in the series finale "What You Leave Behind", where the Pah-wraiths choose him as their emissary instead of Winn. Sisko, emissary of the Prophets, arrives to stop him and at Winn's advice shoves himself, the Pah-wraiths' holy book, and Dukat into the burning fire caves, sealing Dukat in the Fire Caves with the Pah-wraiths forever.

== Reception ==
In 2009, IGN ranked Dukat as the 15th best character of Star Trek overall, calling the character a complicated and nuanced "bad guy". They note the character's morality in "Indiscretion" as well as his introduction in the Deep Space Nine premiere, "Emissary".

In 2016, Screen Rant rated Dukat as the eighth best character in Star Trek overall as presented in television and film. Time rated Gul Dukat the fourth best villain of the Star Trek franchise in 2016.
