= List of Star Trek regions of space =

Several films and episodes of the science fiction franchise Star Trek are set in distinct astrographical regions of space. Some of these fictional locations exhibit anomalous physical properties; others are defined as sensitive buffer zones under various fictional political accords.

This list describes some of the more significant settings for Star Trek films or story arcs over multiple television episodes.

== Badlands ==
The Badlands comprise an area of space that appears (or is referenced) in episodes of Star Trek: Deep Space Nine and Star Trek: Voyager. Located in Star Trek's Alpha Quadrant, the Badlands are characterized by constant plasma storms and funnel clouds. The Maquis use it in several episodes as a meeting or hiding place because of its treacherous navigation. It is also known to harbor some planets hidden within the clouds and nebulae.

In "Caretaker", the pilot episode of Star Trek: Voyager, the titular starship pursues a Maquis ship into the Badlands before being pushed by an energy wave to the Delta Quadrant.

In "Erigah", the seventh episode of Star Trek: Discovery season 5, the Badlands are determined to be the temporary location of a next clue to finding vital creation-of-life technology. The Badlands are also mentioned in the computer game Star Trek: Armada II, where the Borg build up forces in that area close to the Federation.

== Bajoran wormhole ==
In the fictional Star Trek universe, the Bajoran wormhole is a spatial anomaly located within 160,000,000 kilometres (1.1 au) (DS9 S1Ep2: "Emissary (Part 2)") of the planet Bajor. It appears as an aperture of swirling golden-white light surrounded by blue clouds, which appears whenever a vessel approaches or exits from it and disappears again afterwards. The wormhole can only be traversed by ships traveling at impulse (sub-light speed) velocities.

The Bajoran wormhole is discovered in the first episode of Star Trek: Deep Space Nine. It is found to connect the Bajor-B'Hava'el system in the Alpha Quadrant to the Idran system in the Gamma Quadrant, which are seventy thousand light-years apart. Due to the strategic importance of such a phenomenon, the Deep Space Nine space station is moved out of Bajor's orbit and repositioned 15 kilometres (9.3 mi) from the wormhole, where it acts as a gateway.

Starfleet Commander Benjamin Sisko and Lieutenant Jadzia Dax are the first people to make contact with the wormhole's mysterious creators, who dwell inside it. Though these incorporeal beings are simply referred to as "wormhole aliens" by the Federation, they are revered as Prophets in the Bajoran religion, and the wormhole itself is referred to as the "Celestial Temple". It is these "Prophets" who provided the Orb-like energy artifacts (or "Tears of the Prophets") to the Bajorans, and these mystical artifacts are the basis of Bajoran religion. Via one of the Orbs, the wormhole is closed by one of the Pah Wraiths, malevolent non-corporeal beings who are enemies of the Prophets. The wormhole is later restored via an additional Orb discovered by Sisko, who is prophesied to be the Prophets' Emissary.

== The Briar Patch ==
Regions called the Briar Patch feature in more than one series.

=== Briar Patch in Star Trek: Insurrection ===
The Briar Patch is a nebula in sector 441 in the Star Trek universe. It was first introduced in the 1998 film Star Trek: Insurrection. While the nebula's visual characteristics are reminiscent of astronomical photographs, many of its more interesting properties were invented to support the film's storyline.

Located in Federation territory, the Briar Patch is a region of space that starships usually avoid; various radiation sources and energy fluctuations impair communications systems, making it difficult for vessels inside the nebula to make contact with those outside the nebula. Cloud pockets of "metreon gas", a highly volatile substance of unknown composition, make travel through the nebula difficult as well; warp drives cannot be used, and even impulse drives are undermined.

The planet featured in Star Trek: Insurrection is a class-M world; it is unusual for its possession of an intricate planetary ring system. The Ba'ku have established a colony on the surface, where the colonists rejected most forms of advanced technology and attempted to create a utopian society. Some time after their arrival, the colonists discovered that "metaphasic radiation" from the Briar Patch has become concentrated in the planet's rings, continually rejuvenating their genetic structure; unbeknownst to the outside universe, the Ba'ku planet is effectively a fountain of youth.

=== Briar Patch in Star Trek: Enterprise ===
The Klingon system Klach D'Kel Brakt is also given the designation "Briar Patch" by Dr Arik Soong in the Star Trek: Enterprise episode "The Augments". At least two inhabitable planets exist there; Soong and his band of Augments attempt to reach the system and use it as a hideout. In 2272, it was also the site of a dramatic Romulan/Klingon confrontation, which was led on the Klingon side by the future Dahar Master Kor, who frequently re-enacts the battle with his fellow veterans and Dahar Masters, Koloth and Kang.

== Delphic Expanse ==
The Delphic Expanse, commonly shortened to "the Expanse", is the setting for the entire third season of Star Trek: Enterprise, first aired in 2003 and 2004.

The Expanse is about 2000 light years across, surrounded by thick thermobaric clouds. Its edge is located about 50 light-years from Earth. It is the home of the previously unknown hostile races collectively known as the Xindi, but the crew of the Enterprise (NX-01) discovers that the Xindi are being manipulated into their enmity by other forces with vested interests in the region.

Intense gravitational distortions, similar to quantum singularities, make travel through the Expanse extremely difficult, as it seems that space does not obey the known laws of physics in this region. Travelers risk injury, disfigurement, and death if their vessels are not lined with the protective metal Trellium-D.

Species native to the Expanse include the Loque'eque, the Skagarans, the Triannon, and the Xindi.

Featured locations of the Expanse include Azati Prime, the Calindra system, Oran'taku, Triannon, and Xindus.

=== History of the Expanse ===
Thousands of years ago, a number of cloaked spheres the size of small moons were constructed throughout the Expanse by trans-dimensional beings as a prelude to invasion; their purpose was to alter the fabric of space in the region, to make it habitable for the Sphere Builders. One area of the Expanse, 700 million kilometers wide and centrally located within a group of spheres, has already been distorted into a bubbling particle soup with an organic appearance. The spheres use artificial intelligence and operate as a network, with several providing command functions.

Because the spheres are cloaked, their exact number is unknown. Triannons believe that there are thousands of spheres. Xindi scientists, including Degra, determined that there were at least 78 spheres.

The Triannons call the Expanse the "Chosen Realm", and formed a religion around the spheres and the mythology of their creation.

In 2037, a temporally divergent starship Enterprise from 2154 becomes stranded in the Expanse; it becomes a generational ship, dedicated to countering the Xindi threat destined to arise in the 2150s.

In about 2133, a group of Klingons enter the Expanse, but return anatomically inverted (and still alive). Unsuccessful attempts to explore the region are also made by the Vulcan ships Seleya and Vaankara. The Seleya is later discovered with its crew driven mad due to exposure to Trellium-D, and subsequently destroyed.

In about June 2153, the Earth Starfleet ship Enterprise (NX-01) enters the Expanse to locate the Xindi. It is followed later in the year by the Andorian ship Kumari.

On February 13, 2154, the Enterprise destroys the network of Spheres, reverting the distorted space to its natural form, and gradually dissipating the thermobaric cloud barrier. The Expanse thus ceases to exist, becoming a normal, unthreatening region of space.

Although the Enterprise's Captain Jonathan Archer is shown a possible timeline in which the Expanse becomes a major threat to the future United Federation of Planets, this eventuality appears to be eliminated by the successful destruction of the Spheres.

== Galactic Barrier and Great Barrier ==
In the Star Trek universe, the Galactic Barrier (also referred to as the Great Barrier or Energy Barrier) is an energy field that surrounds the Milky Way Galaxy. The field completely encompasses the galactic disk, preventing a conventional starship from traveling beyond the edge of the galaxy. It is not clear whether the energy barrier is a natural or artificially created phenomenon.

Although numerous attempts to travel outside the galaxy are made, with various degrees of success, the barrier usually damages or destroys ships that try to pass through it. It also has psychoactive effects; some personnel gain powerful telekinetic and telepathic abilities when traveling near the barrier (as seen in the 1966 episode "Where No Man Has Gone Before").

The barrier appears as a pink band of light and, upon entering it, a ship is surrounded by dazzling clouds of colorful energy. Inside the barrier, a ship's engines shut down and navigational systems become erratic.

The Galactic Barrier makes its first appearance in the original series episode "Where No Man Has Gone Before", in which the crew of the USS Enterprise must deal with those affected by the psychic powers of the field—as did the crew of the ill-fated SS Valiant, which encountered the same barrier two centuries earlier.

The barrier is encountered again in the episode "Is There in Truth No Beauty?", where the Enterprise becomes lost within the barrier and is saved by the astounding navigational skills of an alien passenger.

The barrier had also damaged an alien ship from outside the galaxy, as explained in the episode "By Any Other Name", stranding the aliens until they try to steal the Enterprise and return to their home galaxy, Andromeda.

In Star Trek: Discovery season 4, the USS Discovery must venture past the galactic barrier in the 32nd century to make contact with an alien race known as Species 10-C who are using a gravitational anomaly to mine boronite from the Milky Way galaxy, threatening the existence of anything that crosses its path. By this point in time, the energies of the galactic barrier had grown strong enough that shields were actually weakened by passing through, forcing the crew to find and hide in bubbles of stable space to enact repairs before continuing their travels. After Discovery convinced Species 10-C to stand down, the aliens used their wormhole to return Discovery to Earth, negating the need for travel back through the barrier.

In the Star Trek: Discovery series finale "Life, Itself", Discovery used its spore drive to send a Breen dreadnaught and scout ship to the galactic barrier. Commander Rayner noted that it would take a couple of decades for the ships to return, but the crews would survive.

A second barrier at the core of the Milky Way is first revealed in the motion picture Star Trek V: The Final Frontier. Being the only encounter ever shown, the only known reference is the "Great Barrier". This energy barrier at the core is thought to be impenetrable like the one at the edge of the galaxy; however, it is revealed that only mankind's natural fear of the unknown is keeping mankind from entering it.

Non-canonical explanations

Various books try to explain the existence of the galactic barrier, although none of these are canonical:

- The series of novels known as Star Trek: The Q Continuum explain the two barriers, stating that they were created by the Continuum 600,000 years ago, to keep one omnipotent being (known as "The One", which is the same alien encountered in Star Trek V: The Final Frontier) sealed away at the center of the Galaxy, and to keep another (known as "0", whose powers can rival even the Q) locked out of the galaxy forever; this is due to both aliens' previous destructive rampages.
- In William Shatner's novel Captain's Glory, Picard mentions the events of the Q Continuum trilogy, but states that the barrier was built by the proto-humanoids shown in "The Chase" 4 billion years ago, to protect their "children" (the races they seeded across the galaxy) from a dark matter entity known as the Totality.
- The novel Q-Squared reveals the Galactic Barrier to be Q himself, in a time-tossed and temporally discorporated state.

== Galactic quadrants ==
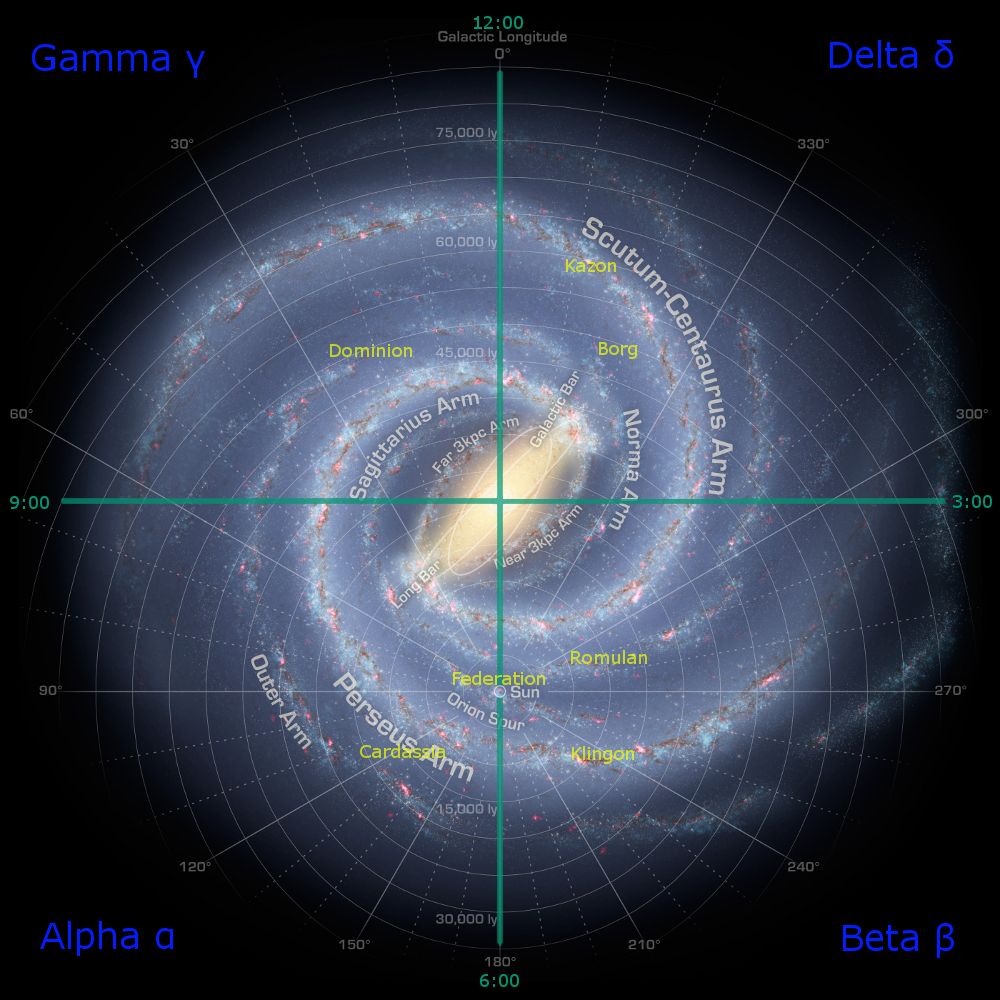
An artistic rendition of the actual Milky Way galaxy, overlaid with one overall view of the fictional quadrant system of the Star Trek universe and the location of certain species.

In the original Star Trek, "quadrant" is used interchangeably with "sector". However, beginning with Star Trek: The Next Generation, the term refers to a galactic coordinate system.

Galactic quadrants within Star Trek are based around a meridian that runs from the center of the Milky Way galaxy through Earth's Solar System, which is not unlike the system of quadrants used by non-fictional astronomers. However, rather than have the perpendicular axis run through the Sun, as is done in astronomy, the Star Trek version runs the axis through the Galactic Center. Also, rather than ordinals, quadrants are designated by the Greek letters Alpha, Beta, Gamma, and Delta.

According to StarTrek.com, "if the great plane of the galaxy is viewed as a clock face and the 6 o'clock position bisects the Sol system" (when viewed from the galactic north pole), then the four fictional quadrants are as follows:

- Alpha Quadrant is the quarter appearing between 6 and 9 o'clock.
- Beta Quadrant is the quarter appearing between 3 and 6 o'clock.
- Gamma Quadrant is the quarter appearing between 9 and 12 o'clock.
- Delta Quadrant is the quarter appearing between 12 and 3 o'clock.

=== Alpha and Beta Quadrants ===
The Alpha Quadrant and the nearby areas of the Beta Quadrant comprise the primary setting of Star Trek: The Original Series, Star Trek: The Next Generation, Star Trek: Deep Space Nine, and Star Trek: Enterprise. According to the Encyclopedia, the Federation is largely on the Alpha Quadrant side, but with parts in the Beta Quadrant, whereas the Klingon and Romulan Empires are mainly in the Beta Quadrant but extend in part into the Alpha Quadrant. The Star Trek Star Charts have the Romulans and Klingons entirely within the Beta Quadrant, as well as the Gorn Hegemony, the Son'a Solidarity, and the Metron Consortium. The Star Trek Star Charts further locate in the Alpha Quadrant the First Federation, Breen, Ferengi, Tzenkethi, Cardassians, Bajorans, Talarians, and Tholians.

Star Trek VI: The Undiscovered Country implies that the Alpha/Beta border runs through, or is relatively close to, Federation space. The Star Trek Encyclopedia attributes this decision to rationalize a line in Star Trek II: The Wrath of Khan, in which James T. Kirk claims that the Enterprise is the only Federation ship in the quadrant. Maps produced by the art staff for the series show that the Alpha/Beta border runs through the Solar System.

The Star Trek Star Charts claim that the Beta Quadrant contains the core worlds Vulcan (40 Eridani), Andoria (Procyon), Risa, and the Rigel (Beta Orionis) systems; the Alpha Quadrant contains Tellar (61 Cygni), Trill, and Betazed.

=== Gamma Quadrant ===
The Dominion, which is one of the most aggressive antagonists in the Deep Space Nine TV series, control a large portion of the Gamma Quadrant. The Alpha Quadrant comes in contact with the Dominion through the Bajoran wormhole, which is the setting and primary source of conflict in the series. In Star Trek: Prodigy, Federation bases in the Gamma Quadrant are mentioned.

=== Delta Quadrant ===
Most of the information about the Delta Quadrant and its inhabitants comes from the series Star Trek: Voyager. This quadrant is largely unexplored by the United Federation of Planets, apart from the return voyage of the USS Voyager, the USS Equinox, the USS Raven, and the Federation citizens assimilated into or de-assimilated from the Borg. The Delta Quadrant is home to the Borg Collective, the Kazon, the Vidiians, the Talaxians, the Ocampa, the Hirogen, and the Malon.

Star Trek: Prodigy, which takes place several years after the end of Star Trek: Voyager, also explores the Delta Quadrant. The crew of young aliens who serve as the main characters start the series as slaves on the Tars Lamora prison colony in the Delta Quadrant where they find and steal the derelict USS Protostar. It is later revealed that the Protostar was sent to continue the mission of exploration begun by Voyager. In the second season, now-Vice Admiral Kathryn Janeway returns to the Delta Quadrant in the Voyager-A to stop the threat posed by the Vau N'Akat.

In the Star Trek: Starfleet Academy episode "Vox In Excelso" taking place in the late 32nd century, a news report mentions that the Hirogen were meeting with the Ni'Var Council ahead of a planned Delta Quadrant summit.

=== Galactic Core ===
On some Star Trek maps of the center of the Milky Way galaxy, the galactic core is regarded as its own area, not part of any of the four Quadrants. The Cytherians, from the Next Generation episode "The Nth Degree," are located near this area. In Star Trek V: The Final Frontier, a "God"-being is encountered from within what is called the "Great Barrier".

== Nekrit Expanse ==
The Nekrit Expanse is a vast unpopulated nebular region in the Delta Quadrant, several thousand light years across. It is impossible to chart due to its constantly changing structure. As a result of its size, the Expanse functions as a natural barrier, limiting contact between species on either side of the cloud. The USS Voyager enters the expanse in 2373.

== Neutral Zone ==
In the Star Trek universe, a neutral zone is a sort of "buffer zone" between the territories of two different powers; if either party enters a neutral zone, it is considered an aggressive move (usually an act of war). In the course of the various series, the Federation develops two neutral zones: One with the Klingon Empire and one with the Romulan Star Empire; the generic term "the Neutral Zone" usually refers to the Romulan Neutral Zone. Also, a neutral zone in all but name exists between the Federation and the Cardassians.

=== Cardassian Demilitarized Zone ===
There is a Federation-Cardassian demilitarized zone created at the end of hostilities between the two powers in the mid-24th century. The peace treaty ending the war and subsequent border adjustments result in several Federation worlds within the zone being ceded to the Cardassians, and vice versa. Militant Federation colonists called the Maquis form a guerrilla militia to oppose the treaty and their new Cardassian administrators; they receive assistance from sympathetic Federation citizens, including several Starfleet officers, and from Bajoran veterans of the long Cardassian occupation of Bajor. The DMZ ceases to exist at the outbreak of the Dominion War in 2373; the Maquis are subsequently eliminated as a functional resistance group by a joint Cardassian-Dominion task force.

=== Klingon Neutral Zone ===
The Klingon Neutral Zone, sometimes known as the Organian Neutral Zone, appears to be set up during the time of the Star Trek: The Original Series. Unlike the Romulan Neutral Zone, the Klingon Neutral Zone appears to have some commercial traffic crossing it.

The Organians are non-corporeal beings from the planet Organia IV, which is strategically situated between the Klingon Empire and the Federation. When both parties, thinking the Organians are a pre-industrial people, attempt to occupy their world, the Organians reveal their posthuman nature and impose the Neutral Zone and a peace treaty between the two powers. In Klingon, this treaty is known as orghenya' rojmab (Organian Peace Treaty).

The zone is the site of the Kobayashi Maru scenario in the film Star Trek II: The Wrath of Khan.

The Klingon Neutral Zone is abolished by the Khitomer Accords in 2293.

In Star Trek Into Darkness, set in an alternate reality, the USS Enterprise violates the Neutral Zone to capture Khan Noonien Singh.

=== Romulan Neutral Zone ===
The Romulan Neutral Zone is established around 2160 or 2161 by the treaty of Algeron which ends the Earth-Romulan War, and is still in effect at the end of Star Trek Nemesis. In the 2009 film Star Trek (specifically the events depicted in the year 2387), Romulus is destroyed when its star goes supernova. Like the Klingon Neutral Zone, any entry into the region by either party is considered an act of war; this is not violated until 2266, when the Romulans cross it, but a war is avoided nevertheless. The Enterprise (NCC-1701) crosses the Neutral Zone three times: Once to get to a starbase quickly when the crew is suffering accelerated aging, once when it is commandeered by a group of disestablishmentarians in their quest for paradise, and once more when the Federation attempts to steal a Romulan cloaking device.

The Neutral Zone remains uncrossed during a period of extended Romulan isolationism. In 2364, several Federation and Romulan outposts along their respective sides of the Neutral Zone are destroyed by unknown forces. The Enterprise-D is ordered to investigate. While visiting some of the Federation sites, Captain Picard encounters a Romulan ship that has crossed the Neutral Zone. Each side suspects the other of being responsible for the attacks. This encounter between representatives of the Federation and the Romulan Empire—the first in over 60 years—ends peacefully. (These events occur in The Next Generation first-season episode "The Neutral Zone".) It is determined several months later that the destruction was caused by the Borg. The following year, the USS Yamato crosses into the Neutral Zone to prevent the Romulans from finding the Iconian home world, an abandoned planet that contains highly advanced technology. In 2366, the Romulan scout ship Pi crashes just inside of Federation space, and a Romulan ship crosses over to recover survivors. Finally, in the same year, a Romulan defects to the Federation, breaching the Neutral Zone, warning of a secret plan to attack the Federation; the Enterprise-D, along with three Klingon warships, in turn, cross the Neutral Zone to investigate the claim.

Subsequent covert incursions of the Neutral Zone include the Romulans' plan to invade Vulcan using disguised Vulcan ships. An overt but lawful entry into the Neutral Zone occurs when the USS Bellerophon participates in a Federation–Romulan conference on Romulus during the Dominion War.

In Star Trek Nemesis, Shinzon lies that he wishes to take down the zone as part of his ultimately failed plot to destroy Earth and the rest of the Federation.

Following the destruction of Romulus in 2387, the Romulan Empire collapsed. With no formal government to enforce the treaty, the Romulan Neutral Zone ceased to exist.

== Sector 001 ==
Sector 001 is the Federation designation for the area of space that contains the Solar System. The term "Sector 001" is used in the 1990 Next Generation episode "The Best of Both Worlds".

== Spatial anomaly ==
In Star Trek and other science fiction, a spatial anomaly (or, often, a sub-space anomaly) is a broad term for any sort of extraordinary disruption in the space-time continuum. It may take the form of irregularities in gravity, ripples in space that can damage equipment and personnel, alterations in the laws of physics, and areas of disruption inimical to the human brain.

The Delphic Expanse was rife with such distortions generated by spheres which reconfigured space to resemble the Sphere Builders' transdimensional realm.

Other episodes featuring spatial anomalies are "Disaster", which features two quantum filaments that temporarily cripple the Enterprise, the series finale of Star Trek: The Next Generation (in which the USS Enterprise-D encounters a "multiphasic temporal convergence in the spacetime continuum", caused by "an eruption of anti-time"), and "One Small Step" (in which the USS Voyager discovers a rare "graviton ellipse").
