= Cardassian =

Fictional extraterrestrial species from Star Trek

- Star Trek race
- Gul Dukat (portrayed by Marc Alaimo), a prominent Cardassian character in Star Trek: Deep Space Nine
- Created by: Jeri Taylor

In-universe information
- Quadrant: Alpha
- Home world: Cardassia Prime

The Cardassians (/kɑːrˈdæsiənz/) are a fictional extraterrestrial species in the American science fiction franchise Star Trek. They were devised in 1991 for the series Star Trek: The Next Generation before being used in the subsequent series Star Trek: Deep Space Nine and Star Trek: Voyager.

The writers of The Next Generation introduced the Cardassians for the fourth season episode "The Wounded" as new antagonists for the crew of the USS Enterprise-D to interact with on a personal level, as the Borg lacked personality or individuality, hindering interpersonal drama.

In the series, set in the 24th century, the Cardassians are presented as living under a military government controlling the Cardassian Union, an interstellar empire occupying other planets, most notably Bajor. When Star Trek: Deep Space Nine was launched in 1993, its writers set its events in the vicinity of Bajor in the aftermath of the Cardassian occupation.

The Cardassians grew into major antagonists throughout the series, with several recurring characters developed, including Elim Garak (Andrew Robinson) and Gul Dukat (Marc Alaimo).

== Design ==
The design of the Cardassians was undertaken by The Next Generation's costume designer Bob Blackman and makeup designer Michael Westmore. They sought to give the species a "snakelike" appearance. Cardassians have grayish-white skin, ridges on either side of the neck, and a spoon-shaped structure on the forehead. Westmore was inspired by an abstract painting he had seen in a Ventura Boulevard store of a wide-shouldered woman with what looked like a spoon on her forehead.

The space station Deep Space Nine was designed as an example of Cardassian architecture

Rick Sternbach designed the Cardassian spaceship in "The Wounded". He initially proposed a pod-shaped vessel, before replacing it with a design resembling a scorpion, then one based on the ankh symbol. Sternbach later noted that "The Galor class started with an Egyptian ankh, given how [the Cardassians] were like the Pharaohs to the Bajoran slaves, but you don't really see the basic shape unless you look straight down on the vessel. The little disruptor pyramids were a bit more obvious, as were the 'temple' type structures on the ship's backbone, and the sandy yellow shades." Ed Miarecki and Tom Hudson built the model used in "The Wounded" from Sternbach's design. In the episode, Cardassian weapons fired a pink discharge, changed to amber in later episodes.

Production designer Herman Zimmerman worked on the Cardassian architecture depicted on the shows. His concept had some Art Deco influence, and was based on geometric patterns. Some motifs were ellipses, angles rather than straight lines, and groups of three.

== Depiction in the shows ==
=== Star Trek: The Next Generation ===
==== "The Wounded": 1991 ====
The emblem of the Cardassian Union, as devised for The Next Generation

The Cardassians were invented by the writers of Star Trek: The Next Generation for the show's fourth season episode "The Wounded", written by Stuart Charno, Sara Charno, and Cy Chermak, with teleplay by Jeri Taylor. It was first screened in January 1991. The script related that the Cardassian Union and the United Federation of Planets—of which Earth was a part—were involved in skirmishes for many years but had signed a peace treaty.

It begins with the revelation that the USS Phoenix, a renegade Federation starship under the command of Captain Benjamin Maxwell (Bob Gunton), has begun attacking Cardassian targets, as Maxwell is convinced the Cardassians are rearming for war against the Federation. The USS Enterprise-D, captained by Jean-Luc Picard (Patrick Stewart), is sent to stop the Phoenix, with the Cardassian Gul Macet (Marc Alaimo) coming aboard the Enterprise to assist.

Alaimo's appearance as Gul Macet in "The Wounded" made him the second actor, after Mark Lenard, to play three separate alien species in the Star Trek franchise. In earlier episodes he portrayed an Antican ("Lonely Among Us") and a Romulan ("The Neutral Zone"). He later portrayed a human in The Next Generation episode "Time's Arrow" before gaining a recurring role as the Cardassian Gul Dukat in Star Trek: Deep Space Nine.

For this episode, several Cardassians were depicted wearing helmets, something never again done in the franchise; Blackman and Westmore's designs also gave Macet facial hair, the only time a Cardassian was shown this way.

==== Later episodes: 1991–1994 ====
In the fifth season episode "Ensign Ro", written by Rick Berman and Michael Piller and first screened in October 1991, the Bajoran species was introduced. It explained that the Cardassians had annexed the Bajoran homeworld, Bajor, 40 years earlier, with many Bajorans fleeing their planet as refugees and often fighting back with militant tactics. "Ensign Ro" was the first episode where Cardassian warships were introduced as "Galor class" vessels. Although it was not intended at the time, the situation between the Cardassians and Bajorans laid the groundwork for the plot of Star Trek: Deep Space Nine.

The Cardassians were central to the two-part sixth season episode "Chain of Command", written by Frank Abatemarco and screened in December 1992. In them, the Federation has gained intelligence that the Cardassians are developing a genetically engineered virus on an uninhabited planet. Picard is sent to infiltrate and destroy the weapon but is apprehended and tortured by the Cardassian Gul Madred (David Warner). "Chain of Command Part I" included the first mentions that the Cardassians' homeworld was called "Cardassia", and the "Cardassian Union" as the name of their interstellar state (previously mentioned only as the "Cardassian Empire"). "Chain of Command Part I" also introduced the news that the Cardassians had withdrawn from Bajor, setting the stage for the events of Star Trek: Deep Space Nine, which began airing a month later. The show's designers introduced the Cardassians' hand weapon in this episode, with Sternbach describing it as like a "copper-colored banana". Part Two of "Chain of Command" provided a brief history of the Cardassians and their military government.

The Cardassians also appeared in the sixth season episode "The Chase", written by Joe Menosky and Ronald D. Moore and screened in April 1993, where it is revealed that humans and Cardassians—as well as the Klingons and Romulans—are all descended from an ancient species who seeded many planets with life. In the seventh season episode "Journey's End", written by Ronald D. Moore, it is explained that the treaty between the Federation and the Cardassians left various Federation planets in Cardassian territory, and that many of these Federation colonists refused to leave. Their presence and struggle for independence from Cardassian rule was a recurring theme in both Deep Space Nine and Voyager. "Journey's End" was the first time Cardassian communicators were shown, affixed to the actors' wrists. The conflict between the Cardassians and the rebel colonists, known as the Maquis, was again used as the basis for the series' penultimate episode, "Preemptive Strike", written by Naren Shankar and René Echevarria and directed by Stewart.

=== Star Trek: Deep Space Nine ===
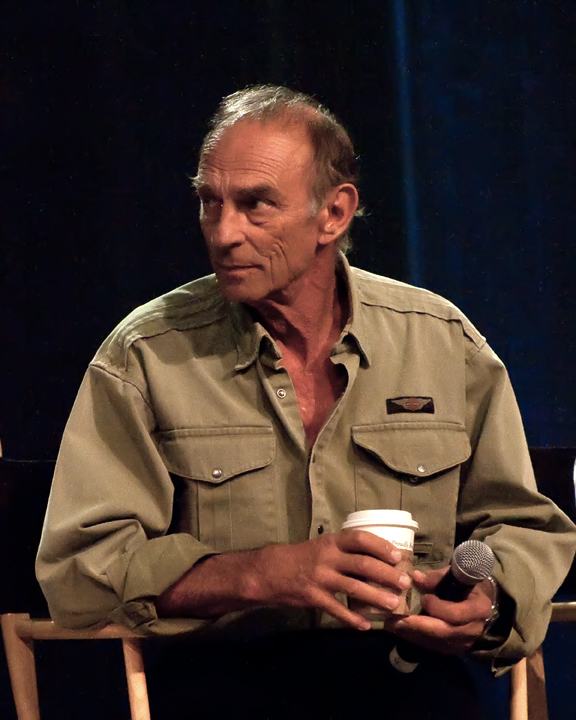
Marc Alaimo was brought in to play Gul Dukat, a recurring Cardassian character in Deep Space Nine.

Launching the new series, Star Trek: Deep Space Nine, was the pilot episode "Emissary", written by Rick Berman and Michael Piller. Focussing on the aftermath of the Cardassian departure from Bajor, the premise of the series revolves around the Federation taking control of Deep Space Nine, a Cardassian-built space station orbiting Bajor, at the request of the Bajoran provisional government.

In "Emissary", the station's new Starfleet commander, Benjamin Sisko (Avery Brooks) is visited by the Cardassian who formerly served as prefect of Bajor, Gul Dukat, played by Marc Alaimo. Alaimo had played a different Cardassian character in The Next Generation, but was brought in to replace the actor formerly cast as Dukat, whose performance had dissatisfied the creative team. Ira Behr recalled that "It was either Mike Piller or Rick Berman who finally said, 'Let's get Marc Alaimo,' who had done a bunch of TNG episodes for them in the past. Marc came in and, of course, he was Gul Dukat." Deep Space Nine would go on to introduce several more Cardassians as recurring characters, including the exiled spy-turned-tailor Elim Garak, whose mysterious past and moral ambiguity made him one of the franchise's most popular recurring characters.

Late in the first season, the show's creative team included another Cardassian-themed episode, "Duet". Written by Lisa Rich and Jeanne Carrigan-Fauci as a bottle episode, it featured the arrest of a Cardassian believed to be guilty of war crimes against Bajor, Aamin Marritza (Harris Yulin), and the relationship he developed with the station's Bajoran second-in-command, Kira Nerys (Nana Visitor). The lengthy speech given to Marritza was an early example of what the writers came to call "Cardassian monologues". Behr said, "Cardassians love to speak. Garak loves to speak, Enabran Tain loves to speak. Dukat loves to speak—very slowly—and certainly Marritza loves to speak."

Over the course of Deep Space Nine, the Cardassians' internal politics and their relationships with the Federation and Bajor go through many upheavals. In early seasons, the Cardassians maintain a shaky alliance with the Federation, which comes to their defense against attacks from the Maquis and the Klingons. An ill-advised attack by the Obsidian Order, the Cardassian intelligence agency, against the alien empire known as the Dominion cripples the power of the Cardassian military dictatorship and allows a civilian government to take control. Later in the series, Dukat negotiates Cardassia's membership in the Dominion in exchange for his own appointment as ruler of Cardassia, leading to a war against the Federation. When Dominion rule becomes too oppressive for the Cardassians, Dukat's successor Damar leads a resistance movement against the Dominion with the support of the Federation and Bajorans, restoring Cardassia's independence. However, during the final battle of the war, the Dominion leader ordered a genocidal retaliation for the Cardassian resistance. Although this was ended, at least eight hundred million people were killed and Elim Garak lamented that their freedom had come at the cost of much of Cardassia's rich culture, best people and greatest minds, leaving the Cardassians facing a dire reconstruction effort.

== Cardassian history ==
Within the Star Trek fictional universe, the Cardassians were once a "peaceful people with a rich spiritual life". However, during this period they also suffered from disease and famine. Nationalistic fervour grew and a military dictatorship was established, under which the citizens became prosperous. The Obsidian Order, an intelligence agency and internal security police force, kept the population under surveillance. The Cardassians became imperialistic, waging war with other races and occupying their territory to exploit resources. The Cardassian empire is known as the Cardassian Union.

=== Occupation of Bajor ===
In 2328, the Cardassians invaded Bajor, occupying it for forty years, during which time they forced many Bajorans into slave labor, using them in their various mining operations. This forced many Bajorans to flee and live in refugee camps away from Cardassian domination, while other Bajorans became involved in the resistance movement, engaged in guerrilla warfare organising terrorist attacks against Cardassian targets.

The Federation would not intervene in the situation, due to Prime Directive considerations.

In 2369, the Bajoran resistance forced the Cardassians off Bajor, after which the Bajoran Provisional Government invited the United Federation of Planets to set up base on the former Cardassian mining station of Terok Nor, renaming it Deep Space Nine.

=== Dominion War ===
During the Dominion War, the Cardassian Union joined the Dominion in opposition to the Federation alliance, taking a main role below the Dominion's rulers, the Founders. They were supplanted by the Breen Confederacy and, after some of their territory was promised to the Breen, the Cardassians rebelled against the Dominion, and were instrumental in defeating the Dominion and ending the war. It was a Bajoran, Colonel Kira Nerys of the Bajoran Militia, who trained the Cardassians in guerrilla warfare to defeat their own occupiers.

== Reception and analysis ==
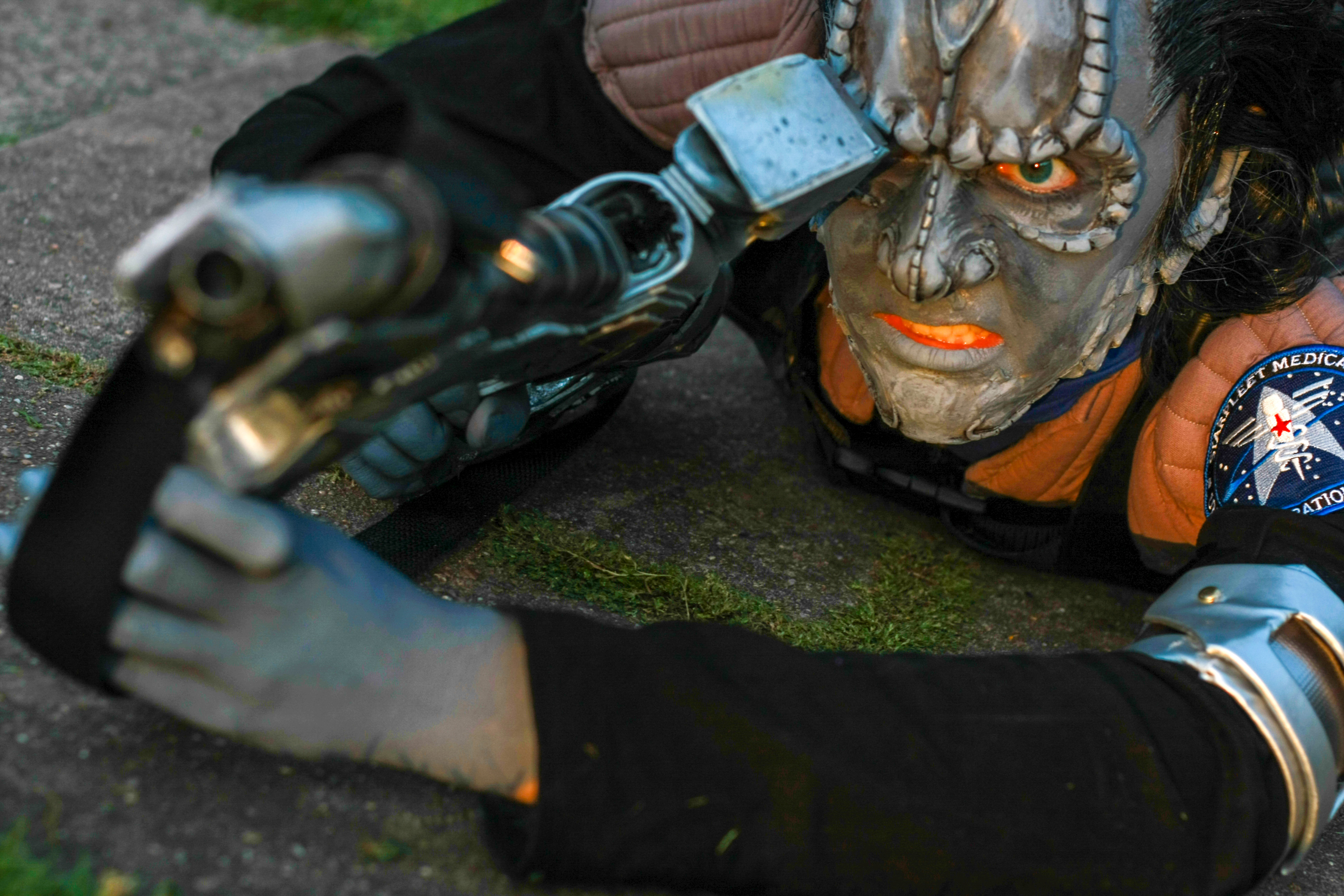
A cosplayer dressed as a Cardassian in a Starfleet uniform

In 2017, Den of Geek ranked Cardassians the 4th best aliens of the Star Trek franchise, behind the Borg but ahead of the Bajorans.

Some of the top-rated television episodes featuring Cardassians in Star Trek: Deep Space Nine include "Improbable Cause", which features an intriguing story centered on Garak, and also "Duet".

Scholar of speculative fiction Nicolas B. Clark saw the Cardassians as exemplary of a wider trend where cultural perceptions of reptiles as "cold, emotionless, alien" lead to depictions of reptilian humanoids in fiction as "unapologetically evil" and "the irredeemable monster that must be slain."

== In cosmology ==
In cosmology, the concept "Cardassian expansion" is a term used for a modification to the Friedmann equations. It is named after the fictional Star Trek race by the original authors, Katherine Freese and Matthew Lewis. In their 2002 paper (which has been cited more than 330 times), a footnote on the "Cardassian term" states: "^{2} The name Cardassian refers to a humanoid race in Star Trek whose goal is to take over the universe, i.e., accelerated expansion. This race looks foreign to us and yet is made entirely of matter."

== See also ==
- The Star Trek Encyclopedia
