= The Darkness and the Light (Star Trek: Deep Space Nine) =

- Star Trek: Deep Space Nine episode
- Episode no.: Season 5 Episode 11
- Directed by: Mike Vejar
- Story by: Bryan Fuller
- Teleplay by: Ronald D. Moore
- Production code: 509
- Original air date: January 6, 1997

Guest appearances
- Randy Oglesby as Silaran Prin; William Lucking as Furel; Diane Salinger as Lupaza; Jennifer Savidge as Trentin Fala; Aron Eisenberg as Nog

Episode chronology
← Previous "Rapture"	Next → "The Begotten"
- Star Trek: Deep Space Nine season 5

"The Darkness and the Light" is the 109th episode of the television series Star Trek: Deep Space Nine, the 11th episode of the fifth season. It premiered on January 6, 1997.

Set in the 24th century, the series follows the adventures of the crew of the space station Deep Space Nine near the planet Bajor, as the Bajorans recover from a decades-long occupation by the imperialistic Cardassians; although the occupation precedes the timeline of the series's narrative, many episodes explore its history and consequences. This episode focuses on the station's second-in-command Kira Nerys and her history as a member of the Bajoran resistance movement during the occupation, as a murderer is targeting Kira's comrades from the resistance.

== Plot ==
Kira is shocked and saddened when Latha Mabrin, a fellow former member of Kira's resistance cell, is murdered. Kira's shock turns to fear when she receives a message consisting of a picture of Latha and a garbled voice saying, "That's one." Kira interprets the message as a threat to all the former members of the cell, and frets that if she were not pregnant as a surrogate mother for Keiko and Miles O'Brien's child she would be better able to protect her comrades.

Kira makes arrangements to transport resistance member Fala onto a runabout returning to Deep Space Nine for her protection; but the transport is sabotaged, and Fala is killed. Kira soon receives a message from the scrambled voice saying "That's two". Later, while working on the case with security chief Odo, Kira receives a "That's three" message displaying the face of Mobara, another member of the cell.

Furel and Lupaza, two more former comrades, come to Deep Space Nine, offering to hunt down the assassin for Kira. She prefers to handle her problem within the boundaries of the law, but allows Furel and Lupaza to stay with her in the O'Briens' quarters. During a staff meeting, Odo surmises that whoever is doing the killing most likely has a vendetta against Kira—and that she is also a likely target, and she notices that the recordings are a modification of her own voice. Soon Furel and Lupaza are killed by an explosion in the O'Brien quarters.

Kira steals a list of suspects from Odo's office and takes off to investigate. She soon arrives at the home of Silaran Prin, one of the suspects. Prin captures and immobilizes her, and explains his motivation.

Prin, a Cardassian civilian who was disfigured in a Resistance bombing, is punishing those responsible. He accuses Kira of killing indiscriminately, while he kills only the guilty. She counters that the Cardassians were a hostile alien race occupying Bajor, and even if he was a civilian he was indirectly aiding the occupation and therefore a legitimate target. Prin tells Kira that he will spare her baby, but kill her, and prepares to operate. Kira begs for a sedative, realizing that the herbs she has taken for her pregnancy render most sedatives ineffective. She pretends to fall asleep, then lunges at Silaran, attacking and killing him. When the Deep Space Nine crew arrives to rescue her, Prin is already dead, and Kira, shaken, only wants to go home.

== Production ==
The episode was the first Star Trek story written by Bryan Fuller, whose original pitch for the episode was a riff on the Agatha Christie novel And Then There Were None; Fuller went on to write another fifth season episode, "Empok Nor", before going on to join the writing staff for Star Trek: Voyager, eventually rising to co-producer by its final season. In 2016 Fuller was briefly showrunner for Star Trek: Discovery; he established the story arc and mythology, but left prior to the series airing due to other commitments.

== Reception ==
Zack Handlen of The A.V. Club praised Visitor "her usual excellent self" but was critical of the script "feels like something we've seen before" Keith R. A. DeCandido of Tor.com gave the episode 5 out of 10.

In 2018, Syfy recommend this episode for its abbreviated watch guide for the character Kira Nerys.

Writing for Syfy Wire in 2017, Dany Roth ranked this the 7th best episode written by Bryan Fuller. Roth was very positive about this episode centering on Kira, and thought Nana Visitor brought a lot to this story and character.

In 2017, Screen Rant ranked this episode the 15th thematically darkest episode of the Star Trek franchise. They note this episode for going beyond Gene Roddenberry’s hopeful vision of the future in the Star Trek universe by exploring the acts of violence by the oppressors and the oppressed during the Cardassian occupation of Bajor. They note while the episode does not really exonerate Kira for her war activities, her vigilante prosecution is not on a moral high-ground either. They point out the "brutal" discussion where neither apologizes for their activities, leaving audiences to consider the morality of the actions which the characters are keen to pass off.
