= The Collaborator (Star Trek: Deep Space Nine) =

- Star Trek: Deep Space Nine episode
- Episode no.: Season 2 Episode 24
- Directed by: Cliff Bole
- Story by: Gary Holland
- Teleplay by: Gary Holland; Ira Steven Behr; Robert Hewitt Wolfe
- Production code: 444
- Original air date: May 23, 1994

Guest appearances
- Philip Anglim as Bareil; Louise Fletcher as Winn; Camille Saviola as Kai Opaka; Bert Remsen as Kubus; Tom Villard as Prylar Bek

Episode chronology
| ← Previous "Crossover" | Next → "Tribunal" |
- Star Trek: Deep Space Nine season 2

"The Collaborator" is the 44th episode of the science fiction television series Star Trek: Deep Space Nine, the 24th episode of the second season.

Set in the Star Trek universe in the 24th century, the series follows the adventures of the crew of the space station Deep Space Nine near the planet Bajor, as the Bajorans recover from a brutal, decades-long occupation by the imperialistic Cardassians. In this episode, the station's first officer, Major Kira, finds herself investigating Vedek Bareil, a high-ranking cleric in the Bajoran religious hierarchy, when pursuing allegations that he collaborated with the Cardassians during the occupation.

This episode aired in broadcast syndication on May 23, 1994.

== Plot ==
The Bajorans are about to select a new Kai, the supreme religious leader of all Bajor, after the loss of the popular and respected previous Kai Opaka. Major Kira hopes to see Vedek Bareil become the new Kai, but he is running against a formidable opponent: Vedek Winn. Kira has recently started a romance with Bareil; she loathes Vedek Winn, both personally and politically, and has a strong suspicion that Winn is responsible for a recent assassination attempt on Bareil.

Meanwhile, security chief Odo has arrested a Bajoran man called Kubus Oak, who was exiled for collaborating with the Cardassians during their occupation of Bajor. Vedek Winn offers Kubus sanctuary in exchange for information about a massacre that the Cardassians committed during the occupation. The massacre claimed the lives of 43 Bajoran rebels (including Opaka's own son), and Kubus claims that it was Bareil who tipped off the Cardassians to the rebels' location. Winn is eager to find proof; she gloats to Kira that she is about to ruin Bareil's chances for becoming Kai, and manipulates her into volunteering to investigate the case.

The crew analyzes some records and finds evidence that does indicate that Bareil was responsible. In disbelief, Kira confronts him. He admits to having provided the Cardassians with the location of the rebels; he explains that if he had not, the Cardassians would have destroyed village after village until they were certain they had wiped out the rebels. Bareil gave them the information to save a thousand villagers, at the cost of the 43.

Kira is crushed. Soon after, she hears that Bareil has withdrawn his candidacy for Kai, clearing the way for Winn to take the post. With further investigation, Kira makes another confusing discovery: proof that Bareil was not the source of the information. He was covering up for someone else. When she asks him about it, he admits to her that it was the revered Kai Opaka who had been the "collaborator". She had sacrificed the rebels, including her son, to save the villagers. Bareil covered for her because the Bajorans need to believe in her during this painful time in their history.

While Kira is hardly convinced that those sentiments are worth the price of allowing Winn to become Kai, Bareil says that it will be up to them to influence her towards something positive.

== Reception ==
Reviewing the episode in 2013 for Tor.com, Keith R.A. DeCandido gave it a rating of 5 out 10, describing character Kubus and Winn as the most fascinating characters in the episode.

In 2020, io9 listed this as one of the "must-watch" episodes of the series.

== Releases ==
This was released on VHS with "Crossover" on one VHS cassette, Star Trek: Deep Space Nine Vol. 22 - Crossover/The Collaborator.

On April 1, 2003 Season 2 of Star Trek: Deep Space Nine was released on DVD video discs, with 26 episodes on seven discs.

This episode was released in 2017 on DVD with the complete series box set.
