= The Siege (Star Trek: Deep Space Nine) =

- Star Trek: Deep Space Nine episode
- Episode no.: Season 2 Episode 3
- Directed by: Winrich Kolbe
- Written by: Michael Piller
- Production code: 423
- Original air date: October 11, 1993

Guest appearances
- Max Grodénchik as Rom; Aron Eisenberg as Nog; Philip Anglim as Vedek Bareil; Louise Fletcher as Vedek Winn; Richard Beymer as Li Nalas; Stephen Macht as General Krim; Frank Langella (uncredited) as Minister Jaro; Steven Weber as Colonel Day; Rosalind Chao - Keiko O'Brien

Episode chronology
| ← Previous "The Circle" | Next → "Invasive Procedures" |
- Star Trek: Deep Space Nine season 2

"The Siege" is the 23rd episode of the American science fiction television series Star Trek: Deep Space Nine. It is the third in a three-part story arc, and the third episode of the second season.

Set in the 24th century, the series follows the adventures on Deep Space Nine, a space station located near the planet Bajor and managed by the Starfleet, as the Bajorans recover from a decades-long, brutal occupation by the imperialistic Cardassians. This episode concludes the three-episode story arc that began the second season of the series, following "The Homecoming" and "The Circle". In the previous episodes, Li Nalas, a hero of the Bajoran resistance against the Cardassian occupation, was appointed liaison to Deep Space Nine, but as the Bajoran nationalist movement known as the Circle gained influence, the Bajoran government ordered Starfleet to evacuate DS9. In this episode, Li and Starfleet commander Benjamin Sisko help stop DS9 from being commandeered by the Circle, while Major Kira and Lt. Dax try to discredit the Circle to the Bajoran government.

== Plot ==
Bajoran assault vessels approach Deep Space Nine as part of a military coup against the Bajoran government led by the xenophobic movement "The Circle". Sisko announces that he is evacuating the station's civilian population and anyone who wishes to leave; the entire crew volunteers to stay with him and fight. Li Nalas calms the flood of civilian passengers by inspiring courage in his fellow Bajorans. Quark ends up left on the station when a scheme to make money buying and selling seats on the evacuation ships backfires.

Once the Bajoran forces arrive, there is no sign of Federation presence; however, General Krim suspects Federation personnel are still aboard. Coup leader Jaro Essa orders Krim to capture Li Nalas alive, convinced that he can bribe Li into joining the Circle. Krim's soldiers begin a search of the station; security chief Odo uses his shape-shifting abilities to help the crew avoid detection, while Sisko and his crew launch a guerrilla campaign to harass and disrupt the Bajoran militia.

Kira and Dax are sent to bring evidence that the Cardassians are backing the Circle to Bajor. Dropped off on a moon where the Bajorans stored a number of small starfighters during the occupation, they manage to get one of the craft working and fly to Bajor. Their ship is shot down by Bajoran fighters, necessitating a crash landing.

Sisko and the crew trap a group led by Krim's second-in-command, Colonel Day, in a holosuite. Sisko informs the soldiers about Cardassian involvement with the Circle and releases Day to pass the information to Krim, but the colonel instead tells Krim that the Federation is attempting to wrest control of DS9 from the Bajorans. A scan for Federation communicator signals reveals that they are hiding in the conduits, and Odo informs Sisko that the soldiers intend to flood the conduits with gas. Part of the crew distracts the bulk of the Bajoran forces, after which Li and Sisko capture Krim in an attempt to reason with him.

Although Kira was injured in the crash, Dax gets her to Vedek Bareil's monastery. She and Kira disguise themselves as clerics to travel to the Chamber of Ministers. Once there, Kira confronts the ministers with proof of Cardassian involvement; exposed, Jaro yields without a fight. Upon learning of the Cardassian involvement, Krim returns control of DS9 back to Sisko before departing for Bajor to resign his commission. However, Colonel Day attempts to assassinate Sisko in revenge; Li Nalas steps in the way of Day's weapon blast and is killed. Day is arrested, and the combined backlash over their Cardassian support and having killed a beloved national figure utterly discredits the Circle.

In the aftermath, as Kira mourns Li, Sisko tells Chief O'Brien that Li was a hero of the resistance and that is the way he will remember him.

== Casting ==
The episode includes many guest stars, in addition to the regular Deep Space Nine cast. This includes Rosalind Chao, Max Grodenchik, Aron Eisenberg, Hana Hatae, Philip Anglim and Louise Fletcher appear in their recurring DS9 roles; guest actors include Steven Weber as Day, Richard Beymer as Li, Stephen Macht as Krim, and Katrina Carlson as a Bajoran officer. Frank Langella makes an uncredited guest appearance as Jaro in this and the preceding episodes, according to Winrich Kolbe, he requested to be uncredited because he was appearing on the show as a gift to his children, rather than for money or exposure.

== Reception ==
In 2015, Geek.com recommended this episode as "essential watching" for their abbreviated Star Trek: Deep Space Nine binge-watching guide, they noted that this episode is part of a trilogy that includes the first three episodes of the second season, ("The Homecoming", "The Circle", and "The Siege").

In 2018, SyFy recommended this episode for its abbreviated watch guide for the Bajoran character Kira Nerys, as a trilogy with the preceding two episodes.

== Releases ==
"The Siege" and "Invasive Procedures" were released on VHS together in the U.K. on one cassette tape (catalog number VHR 2719).

On September 17, 1997, "The Siege" and "Invasive Procedures" were released on LaserDisc in the United States. Released by Paramount Home Video, the 12 inch optical disc used both sides for a runtime of 92 minutes with the shows.

It was released on LaserDisc in Japan on June 6, 1997 as part of the half season collection 2nd Season Vol. 1, which had seven doubled sided 12" discs. The discs had English and Japanese audio tracks.

On April 1, 2003 Season 2 of Star Trek: Deep Space Nine was released on DVD video discs, with 26 episodes on seven discs.

This episode was released in 2017 on DVD with the complete series box set, which had 176 episodes on 48 discs.
