= The Begotten =

- Star Trek: Deep Space Nine episode
- The baby changeling greets Odo and Mora
- Episode no.: Season 5 Episode 12
- Directed by: Jesús Salvador Treviño
- Written by: René Echevarria
- Production code: 511
- Original air date: January 27, 1997

Guest appearances
- Rosalind Chao as Keiko; Duncan Regehr as Shakaar; Peggy Roeder as Y'Pora; James Sloyan as Dr. Mora Pol

Episode chronology
← Previous "The Darkness and the Light"	Next → "For the Uniform"
- Star Trek: Deep Space Nine season 5

"The Begotten" is the 110th episode of the television series Star Trek: Deep Space Nine, the 12th episode of the fifth season.

Set in the 24th century, the series follows the adventures on the Starfleet-managed space station Deep Space Nine near the planet Bajor; later seasons depict a conflict with a hostile alien empire known as the Dominion, ruled by the shapeshifting Changelings. In this episode, Deep Space Nine's security chief Odo, a former Changeling who has been stripped of his powers because he killed another Changeling, attempts to raise an infant Changeling while contending with the scientist who mistreated him when he was an infant shapeshifter himself; meanwhile Major Kira Nerys gives birth to Keiko and Miles O'Brien's baby.

This episode is the second appearance of Dr. Mora Pol, the scientist who studied Odo, introduced in the second season's "The Alternate". Actor James Sloyan reprises the role.

== Plot ==
Deep Space Nine's bartender Quark has come into possession of an infant Changeling and sells it to Odo. Odo begins trying to teach his "child" to shapeshift; he is displeased when Dr. Mora, the Bajoran scientist who "raised" Odo, arrives to help.

Dr. Mora and Odo immediately clash over how to best raise the Changeling. Odo, still angry at the invasive methods Dr. Mora employed with him, hopes to reach the infant through encouragement. Mora insists on probing and measuring the creature, to Odo's disgust. Unfortunately, Odo makes little progress using his own methods. Under pressure from Starfleet, Odo has no choice but to resort to Mora's methods.

Using Dr. Mora's equipment, Odo employs electric shocks to prod the changeling into holding several basic forms. Both are amazed when the creature imitates the shape of Odo's face. The moment brings Odo and Mora together—especially when Mora admits to Odo that his caring seems to have helped him form a connection with the baby. Mora's support helps Odo to finally forgive Mora for treating him more as a specimen than as a person. He invites Dr. Mora to celebrate their success with a glass of champagne, but the happy mood is shattered when Odo receives word that the creature is dying.

Dr. Bashir is unable to save the "child". Odo holds the dying creature in his hands, and, as it dies, the infant Changeling merges into Odo and restores his shapeshifting abilities.

Meanwhile, Major Kira goes into labor, and gives birth as a surrogate mother to Keiko and Miles O'Brien's baby, after having to hear the bickering of Shakaar, Kira's lover, and Miles (to the point where they are nearly kicked out of seeing Kira give birth). At the end of the episode, Kira tells Odo about her feelings of loss, after turning over the baby to his parents. Odo tells her he knows how she feels, and the two go for a walk together.

== Production ==
This episode was directed by Jesús Salvador Treviño and written by René Echevarria.

== Reception ==
This episode first aired on television on January 27, 1997. It received Nielsen ratings of 6.2 points when it premiered.

Zack Handlen of The A.V. Club gave the episode a positive review, saying: "this shouldn’t work. But it does." Keith DeCandido of Tor.com gave it 6 out of 10, and felt it was a lost opportunity not to use the character Worf, as he had helped Keiko with her delivery of Molly; this event was previously mentioned in the episode "Accession".

In 2015, Geek.com recommended this episode as "essential watching" for their abbreviated Star Trek: Deep Space Nine binge-watching guide. In 2018, SyFy recommend this episode for its abbreviated watch guide for the Bajoran character Kira Nerys. They note this episode for having connections and "beautiful moments." In 2019, Tor.com also noted this as an "essential" for the character of Odo, but also noting the O'Brien's birth story with Kira and noting the common theme of parenting. In particular they note how they explore Odo's feelings about parenting, compared to issues he had during his upbringing.
