= Return to Grace =

- Star Trek: Deep Space Nine episode
- Episode no.: Season 4 Episode 14
- Directed by: Jonathan West
- Story by: Tom Benko
- Teleplay by: Hans Beimler
- Production code: 486
- Original air date: February 5, 1996

Guest appearances
- Marc Alaimo as Dukat; Cyia Batten as Ziyal; Casey Biggs as Damar

Episode chronology
← Previous "Crossfire"	Next → "Sons of Mogh"
- Star Trek: Deep Space Nine season 4

"Return to Grace" is the 86th episode of the television series Star Trek: Deep Space Nine, the 14th episode of the fourth season. "Return to Grace" had a Nielsen rating of 6.5 when it was broadcast on television in 1996.

Set in the 24th century, the series follows the adventures on the space station Deep Space Nine near the planet Bajor, as the Bajorans recover from a brutal, decades-long occupation by the imperialistic Cardassians. By the fourth season, the Cardassians have made peace with the Bajorans, but are fighting a difficult war with the Klingons. In this episode, the Cardassian officer Gul Dukat, in disgrace after acknowledging his half-Bajoran daughter Ziyal, strikes back against the Klingons over the objections of his government.

This episode marks the first appearance of the recurring character Damar (played by Casey Biggs), Dukat's second in command, and the second appearance of Ziyal, played by Cyia Batten. It is a followup to the episode "Indiscretion" from earlier in the season, in which Bajoran officer Kira Nerys persuaded Dukat to spare his daughter's life.

== Plot ==
Major Kira is shocked to find out that Dukat will be captaining the freighter transporting her to a conference regarding the Klingon threat. Dukat was recently demoted when it became publicly known that he has a half-Bajoran daughter Ziyal, and he now works in a dreary job flying an unremarkable trading ship.

When they arrive they find the conference site obliterated, and a Klingon Bird of Prey warship leaving the area, not even bothering to attack what it considers a lowly freighter. Kira suggests that they adapt the planet's weapons for use by the freighter, effectively turning it into a Q-ship, and then they head after the Bird of Prey. They soon find it, and after tricking the Bird of Prey into thinking they are carrying valuable cargo, use their new weaponry to cripple the Klingon vessel. After commandeering the Bird of Prey and transporting the Klingons to the freighter, Dukat mercilessly destroys the freighter. Dukat notifies his superiors of his capture of the Klingon ship, hoping to regain some respect and spur the Cardassians into fighting the Klingons; they offer him his old job back, but order him to take no further offensive actions against the Klingons.

Disgusted, Dukat vows to fight the whole Klingon Empire himself if he has to. He offers Kira a place on his crew, saying her experience as a resistance fighter would be valuable. She declines, taking Ziyal back to Deep Space Nine with her until Dukat's personal war is over.

== Reception ==
The A.V. Club praised Marc Alaimo for his "ability to make Dukat charismatic, slimy, and yet weirdly sympathetic [which] has helped make the character one of the best villains in Trek history." Tor.com rated the episode seven out of ten.

In 2015, Geek.com recommended this episode as "essential watching" for their abbreviated Star Trek: Deep Space Nine binge-watching guide.

In 2018, SyFy recommended this episode for its abbreviated watch guide for the character Kira Nerys.
