= In the Hands of the Prophets =

- Star Trek: Deep Space Nine episode
- Episode no.: Season 1 Episode 20
- Directed by: David Livingston
- Written by: Robert Hewitt Wolfe
- Cinematography by: Marvin Rush
- Production code: 420
- Original air date: June 21, 1993

Guest appearances
- Louise Fletcher as Winn Adami; Philip Anglim as Vedek Bareil; Rosalind Chao as Keiko O'Brien; Robin Christopher as Neela

Episode chronology
← Previous "Duet"	Next → "The Homecoming"
- Star Trek: Deep Space Nine season 1

"In the Hands of the Prophets" is the twentieth and final episode of the first season of the American science fiction television series Star Trek: Deep Space Nine. Written by Robert Hewitt Wolfe and directed by David Livingston, the episode originally aired in broadcast syndication during the week of June 21, 1993.

Set in the 24th century, the series follows the adventures on Deep Space Nine, a space station located near a stable wormhole between the Alpha and Gamma quadrants of the galaxy; the wormhole is occupied by powerful alien entities that are worshiped by the people of the nearby planet Bajor as "the Prophets". In this episode, friction escalates when Bajoran cleric Vedek Winn (Louise Fletcher) arrives on the station and finds schoolteacher Keiko O'Brien (Rosalind Chao) teaching Bajoran children that their gods are merely "wormhole aliens".

The story revisits the religious themes introduced in "Emissary", the series premiere. "In the Hands of the Prophets" provides a deeper focus on Bajoran politics and religion and highlights what happens when the values and beliefs of one culture are imposed on another. The episode features the first appearances of Louise Fletcher and Philip Anglim in their recurring roles as Vedek Winn and Vedek Bareil. 8.8 million people viewed the episode on its first broadcast, the lowest of any first-run episode during season one. Critical reception to the episode was positive, with Fletcher and Avery Brooks receiving praise for their performances.

== Plot ==
Chief Miles O'Brien (Colm Meaney) walks his wife Keiko (Rosalind Chao) to the school where she teaches students on the station. They discuss Bajoran culture, a topic Miles learned about from Neela (Robin Christopher), his Bajoran assistant. At the school, Keiko teaches her class about the science of the Bajoran wormhole and the aliens that live inside it. This scientific view is different from the religious approach taken by the Bajorans, who believe the wormhole is the legendary Celestial Temple inhabited by their "Prophets", whom they worship as gods. Her class is interrupted by one of Bajor's spiritual leaders, Vedek Winn (Louise Fletcher). Winn questions why Keiko does not teach Bajoran religion in her classroom. Afterwards, Keiko reports the incident to Commander Benjamin Sisko (Avery Brooks). When Sisko asks Winn about the dispute, she says there may be consequences if Keiko refuses to teach religion. Meanwhile, Miles discovers an important engineering tool is missing, but is distracted when he and Neela discover the remains of a Starfleet ensign.

Outside the school, Winn and a group of Bajorans protest Keiko's teaching methods. Winn offers Keiko a solution—all she has to do is simply stop teaching about the wormhole. When Keiko refuses to accept Winn's proposal, Winn leads the Bajoran parents to take their children out of school. Sisko visits Vedek Bareil (Philip Anglim), a more progressive Bajoran cleric, for advice on the problem. Bareil opposes Winn's views but he cannot support Sisko as he is attempting to become the next Kai, the leader of the Bajoran religion. Sisko returns to DS9 and asks for help from Major Kira Nerys (Nana Visitor), his Bajoran first officer, but she also refuses to help. Meanwhile, security chief Odo (René Auberjonois) and Doctor Julian Bashir (Alexander Siddig) finish investigating the remains of the Starfleet ensign Miles and Neela found earlier. They discover that the ensign was murdered by a phaser when he became aware of someone tampering with the Runabout security controls.

Later, an explosion occurs inside the empty school, destroying it. Sisko confronts Winn, blaming her actions for increasing the risk of violence on the station. Neela meets with Winn, revealing that the two had been working together. She informs Winn that her escape plan with the Runabout will no longer work. Winn tells Neela to continue with the plan, even if it means Neela must sacrifice herself. Bareil arrives at the station to help, and at the same time, Miles and Lt. Jadzia Dax (Terry Farrell) discover a hidden sub-program on the station's computer created by Neela. The program controls a timed delay of forcefields running from the promenade to the Runabouts. They alert Sisko who is nearby, just as Bareil and Winn begin to address a crowd of Bajorans on the promenade. Sisko searches the crowd just in time to see Neela raising her phaser at Bareil. Sisko tackles Neela to the ground and saves Bareil's life. Kira suggests that the assassination attempt was planned by Winn to secure her position as the new Kai, but Neela insists she was working alone. Kira later apologises to Sisko, and agrees with his earlier sentiment about Winn's actions.

== Production ==
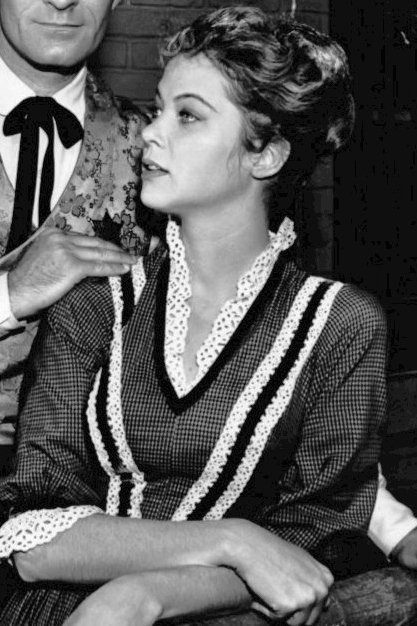
"In the Hands of the Prophets" featured the Deep Space Nine debut of Louise Fletcher.

Prior to the scripting of "In the Hands of the Prophets", a crossover with the cast of Star Trek: The Next Generation was proposed for the season finale. However, this idea was dropped in favor of an episode which would end the season on a religious note similar to "Emissary", the series premiere. During the writing of the episode, executive producer Michael Piller was concerned that it was not going to be as good as the previous episode, "Duet". Ira Steven Behr credited this as setting a challenge for the writing team which improved the episode. "It gave us even more grist for the mill than 'Duet' did, and together they provided a great one-two punch to the end of the first season", Behr recalled.

The episode marked the debut of Philip Anglim as Vedek Bareil and Louise Fletcher as Vedek Winn. Bareil and Winn became recurring characters throughout the rest of the series. Fletcher was best known for playing the role of Nurse Ratched in One Flew Over the Cuckoo's Nest (1975), for which she received the Academy Award for Best Actress, the Golden Globe Award for Best Actress in a Motion Picture, Drama and the BAFTA Award for Best Actress in a Leading Role. She did not have to read for the role of Vedek Winn, nor was she familiar with the Star Trek series or its heritage before accepting the role. Robin Christopher makes her appearance in this episode for the second and last time as Neela, first appearing in the previous episode, "Duet".

"In the Hands of the Prophets" is the third episode directed by David Livingston. With a budget larger than most of the other first season episodes, Livingston used more extras which allowed him to create larger crowd scenes. Livingston's first location shoot took place during Bareil's sanctuary scene on Bajor. Filmed on location at Fern Dell at Griffith Park, Los Angeles, Livingston found it difficult to shoot the scene due to the density of the foliage and access to the dell. This same location previously appeared in the holodeck scenes used in "Encounter at Farpoint", the pilot episode of The Next Generation.

Filmed in full scale, the school explosion used drywall around the interior of the set to protect it from the fire. Physical effects supervisor Gary Monak oversaw the explosion. The destruction surprised the cast as they were more used to optical effects in the series. Costume designer Robert Blackman created the Vedek costumes. Crew members suggested that Blackman based his Vedek hats on the form of the Sydney Opera House, but Blackman denied the design was deliberate.

== Themes ==
"In the Hands of the Prophets" is the first episode in the series to examine the conflict between elements of the Bajoran religion and the secularism of Starfleet. Writer Robert Hewitt Wolfe says the episode maintains the consistency of Gene Roddenberry's vision for Star Trek:

I have no argument with someone having a fundamentalist belief in Christianity or Islam or Judaism or Buddhism or anything else, but I do have a serious objection to people trying to impose their values on other people. And that's what this episode is about. No one has the right to force anyone to believe the things that they believe. That's one of the beautiful things about Gene Roddenberry's vision of IDIC (Infinite Diversity in Infinite Combinations), and that was one of the things that we really wanted to hammer home here. Sisko does everything he can not to impose his values on the Bajorans, but Vedek Winn is determined to impose her values on everyone.

The episode showed the unwillingness of Sisko to accept his position as a religious figure within the Bajoran culture. This theme was first explored in "Emissary", the pilot of the series. The ongoing theme for Bajoran politics and religion began with "In the Hands of the Prophets" and ran through the rest of the series. Wolfe was raised as a Catholic, and he attributes the religious theme of the episode to this influence, as well as his interest in history. He compares the religious intrigue of the story to the history of Catholicism in the 15th and 16th century, a time when members of various families jostled for power to become Pope. When asked to describe the character of Winn, Louise Fletcher said, "Think the Pope in space, except she's like an ancient Pope, from the old days when Popes were ruthless and powerful and exerted their powers and fought wars and did all kinds of naughty things."

Matt Rorie in Screened.com said the writers examined the politics of the Bajoran religion by "planting pious but open-minded Bajorans like Kira against the orthodox, intolerant, fundamentalist majority, as represented by Kai Winn, who was willing to bomb schools and attempt assassinations on her political rivals to stay in power." Zack Handlen in his review for The A.V. Club compared the actions in the episode to the "ideological battles [which] are fought over what's appropriate in the classroom" in the United States.

== Reception ==
"In the Hands of the Prophets" first aired in broadcast syndication on June 20, 1993. It received Nielsen ratings of 8.8 million, placing it in fifth place in the timeslot. It was the least viewed episode of the first season during its initial broadcast. This rating was a slight decrease from the previous week's episode "Duet", which received a rating of 8.9 million.

Several reviewers re-watched the episode after the end of the series. In 2012, Zack Handlen reviewed the episode for The A.V. Club, noting that while the episode was not subtle, it did "a good job expanding the show's world, and playing off of undercurrents and themes which have been built in throughout DS9's first season." He described Winn as the "most unsettling of enemies, a true believer whose faith doesn't prevent her from manipulation and deceit". Handlen described the character of Vedek Winn as "terrific" and was overall positive about the ensemble cast, saying "Avery Brooks has tremendous presence and a terrific voice" and "Nana Visitor is great as always." They suggest the episode "is essentially about the conflicts which arise between cultures even when everyone has the best of intentions."

Reviewing the episode for TrekNation, Michelle Green wrote that the episode was "pretty fantastic" when she originally watched it. Upon re-watching it years later, she thought it had improved even further. Green described the episode as "a no-holds-barred story about the hypocrisy of religious leaders which seems less influenced by the Scopes Trial than by contemporary creationist politicians." She described Fletcher as one of her favourite actresses and thought that she portrayed Vedek Winn as the older sister of Nurse Ratched from One Flew Over the Cuckoo's Nest.

Jamahl Epsicokhan of Jammer's Reviews, said that there was a great deal of plot to cover in the episode and that the strands came together successfully. He singled out Avery Brooks for praise, but thought that there was a number of stand-out performances by the cast. Epsicokhan gave the episode a score of 3.5/4 and thought that it demonstrated the direction that the series intended to go in. In 2013, Keith DeCandido for Tor.com gave the episode a rating of 7 out of 10, and praised the performance of Fletcher, calling her "deliciously evil". He thought that Anglim gave one of his better performances as Vedek Bareil and that the speech by Brooks to Fletcher at the end of the episode was particularly well done.

In 2015, Geek.com recommended this episode as "essential watching" for their abbreviated Star Trek: Deep Space Nine binge-watching guide, along with "Emissary", "Past Prologue", "Vortex", "Battle Lines", and "Duet" from the first season. In 2020, io9 listed this as one of the "must-watch" episodes of the series.

== Home media release ==
"In the Hands of the Prophets" was first released as a two episode VHS cassette alongside "Duet" in the United Kingdom on January 10, 1994. A single episode release followed in the United States and Canada on July 8, 1997. It was released on DVD as part of the season one box set on June 3, 2003.

This episode was released again in 2017 on DVD with the complete series box set, which had 176 episodes on 48 discs.
