= Crossfire (Star Trek: Deep Space Nine) =

- Star Trek: Deep Space Nine episode
- Episode no.: Season 4 Episode 13
- Directed by: Les Landau
- Written by: René Echevarria
- Production code: 485
- Original air date: January 29, 1996

Guest appearances
- Duncan Regehr as Shakaar; Bruce Wright as Sarish

Episode chronology
← Previous "Paradise Lost"	Next → "Return to Grace"
- Star Trek: Deep Space Nine season 4

"Crossfire" is the 85th episode of the television series Star Trek: Deep Space Nine, the 13th episode of the fourth season.

Set in the 24th century, the series follows the adventures on the space station Deep Space Nine near the planet Bajor, as the Bajorans recover from a brutal, decades-long occupation by the imperialistic Cardassians. In this episode, Deep Space Nine's security chief Odo, a shapeshifting Changeling, deals with his unrequited affection for the station's first officer Kira Nerys and his jealousy over her relationship with the Bajoran First Minister, Shakaar. Guest star Duncan Regehr returns in the role of Shakaar.

"Crossfire" attained a Nielsen rating of 7 points when it was broadcast in first-run syndication.

== Plot ==
Odo's regular meeting with Major Kira is interrupted by Quark, who complains that Odo practicing shape-shifting in his quarters (right above Quark's own) causes too much noise.

Later, Shakaar, the First Minister of Bajor, visits Deep Space Nine for a meeting on Bajor's proposed membership in the United Federation of Planets. Odo warns that a threat has been made on Shakaar's life by members of the True Way, a Cardassian extremist group. Odo and Lt. Cmdr. Worf tighten Shakaar's security. At first, Odo and Shakaar get along well. However, Odo soon sees the bond between Kira and Shakaar, and is stricken when Shakaar admits he's falling in love with Kira.

Kira is late for her weekly meeting with Odo after having breakfast with Shakaar. She gives Shakaar a tour of the station, with Odo accompanying them for security. In a turbolift, Odo hears the two talking about plans for the evening. A message in Worf's voice asks to take control of the turbo-lift, and Odo, distracted, grants control without waiting for the code. The turbolift begins plummeting, but Odo changes his arms to solid pylons to stop its descent. Odo later discovers that the request was from a True Way agent using a voice synthesizer. Captain Sisko reprimands him for his lapse in attention.

Shakaar spends the night in Kira's quarters, and in the morning Kira tells Odo that she and Shakaar are now in a relationship, and she is glad Odo is a friend with whom she can talk about her relationships. When he returns to his office, Odo discovers that Worf has found and arrested the True Way operative.

Dismayed at both Kira's romance and Worf doing his job, Odo returns to his quarters and goes into a rage, destroying much of the furniture and decorations inside. Outraged at the noise, Quark confronts Odo but is thrown by how defeated the constable looks. Pretending he is only concerned for his profits from a betting pool rather than friendship for Odo, Quark tells Odo that he has to make a choice: Either tell Kira how he feels or forget her and move on. Later, Odo tells Kira he has to cancel their weekly meetings.

At Quark's bar, Quark thanks Odo for sound-proofing the floor of his quarters; Odo tells Quark that the renovations have nothing to do with him. He sees Kira and Shakaar exiting a holosuite together and continues his rounds.

== Reception ==
"Crossfire" attained a Nielsen rating of 7 points when it was broadcast in first-run syndication.

Zack Handlen of The A.V. Club was critical of the generically meaningless title, but praised the storytelling for making this case of unrequited love easy to understand and relate to, "Odo’s situation is specific, but his condition is universal". Keith R. A. DeCandido of Tor.com gave the episode 9 out of 10.

In 2018, SyFy recommend this episode for its abbreviated watch guide for the character Kira Nerys, since it involves important developments in Kira's personal life.
