= The Circle (Star Trek: Deep Space Nine) =

- Star Trek: Deep Space Nine episode
- Episode no.: Season 2 Episode 2
- Directed by: Corey Allen
- Written by: Peter Allan Fields
- Production code: 422
- Original air date: October 4, 1993

Guest appearances
- Philip Anglim as Vedek Bareil; Louise Fletcher as Vedek Winn; Richard Beymer as Li Nalas; Stephen Macht as General Krim; Frank Langella (uncredited) as Minister Jaro; Bruce Gray as Admiral Chekote; Mike Genovese as Zef'No; Anthony Guidera as the Cardassian

Episode chronology
← Previous "The Homecoming"	Next → "The Siege"
- Star Trek: Deep Space Nine season 2

"The Circle" is the 22nd episode of the American science fiction television series Star Trek: Deep Space Nine. It is the second in a three-part story arc, and also the second episode of the second season.

Set in the 24th century, the series follows the adventures on Deep Space Nine, a space station located near a stable wormhole between the Alpha and Gamma quadrants of the Milky Way Galaxy, in orbit of the planet Bajor. In this episode, a political faction known as The Circle begins a full-scale coup against Bajor's government.

== Plot ==
Kira Nerys has been relieved of her position as Bajoran liaison officer on Deep Space Nine, and her friends Odo, Dax, Bashir, O'Brien and even Quark come to her quarters to say farewell. Vedek Bareil is the last to arrive; he invites Kira to visit his monastery on Bajor. She accepts and, reminiscing, realizes how much she hated her position as liaison officer a year ago and how much she cherishes it now. Li Nalas, who is to replace her, reassures her and Sisko that he did not want the job, and that he knows no one can replace Kira.

On Bajor, Kira and Bareil grow close, and Bareil allows Kira to consult one of the Bajoran Orbs for guidance. She has a vision that includes her and Bareil as lovers, which she conceals from him. Meanwhile, on Deep Space Nine, Quark has heard that the Kressari are arming the xenophobic "Circle" movement, so Odo blackmails him to find out more. After conducting several searches of a Kressari freighter, Dax and O'Brien conclude that there is no evidence of foul play. The freighter departs with Odo assuming the form of a rat and stowing away.

Sisko visits the commander of the Bajoran militia, General Krim, and becomes convinced that the military will not stop the Circle's coup. While on Bajor, he also visits Kira. Shortly after he leaves, however, several masked members of the Circle kidnap her. Bajoran politician Jaro Essa reveals to Kira that he is the true force behind the Circle. He solicits her help, but while she has no love for the provisional government, she tells Jaro that votes, not weapons, are the way to change a government. Quark eventually learns where Kira is from his "contacts". Sisko and the others mount a rescue mission and take her back to the station.

Odo returns, reporting that the Cardassians are arming the Circle through the Kressari in an attempt to force the Federation off Bajor, allowing Cardassia to reconquer it. Unfortunately, by the time this is revealed all communication between Deep Space Nine and Bajor has been cut off.

Jaro goes to Vedek Winn, seeking her support as a spiritual leader in order to legitimize his coup. Several Bajoran assault vessels approach DS9, ordering all non-Bajorans to evacuate. Sisko seeks Starfleet's help, but his superiors order him to comply with the evacuation order. Regardless, Sisko and the crew refuse to give up without a fight.

== Reception ==
In 2015, Geek.com recommended this episode as "essential watching" for their abbreviated Star Trek: Deep Space Nine binge-watching guide, they noted that this episode is part of a trilogy that includes the first three episodes of the second season, "(The Homecoming", "The Circle" and "The Siege").

In 2018, SyFy recommend this episode for its abbreviated watch guide for the Bajoran character Kira Nerys, as a trilogy with the preceding and following episodes.

== Releases ==
It was released on LaserDisc in Japan on June 6, 1997 as part of the half season collection 2nd Season Vol. 1, which had seven doubled sided 12" discs. The discs had English and Japanese audio tracks.

"The Homecoming" and "The Circle" were released on one double sided 12 inch LaserDisc on July 15, 1997 in the United States.

On April 1, 2003 Season 2 of Star Trek: Deep Space Nine was released on DVD video discs, with 26 episodes on seven discs.

This episode was released in 2017 on DVD with the complete series box set, which had 176 episodes on 48 discs.
