= The Homecoming (Star Trek: Deep Space Nine) =

- Star Trek: Deep Space Nine episode
- Episode no.: Season 2 Episode 1
- Directed by: Winrich Kolbe
- Story by: Jeri Taylor; Ira Steven Behr
- Teleplay by: Ira Steven Behr
- Production code: 421
- Original air date: September 27, 1993

Guest appearances
- Max Grodénchik as Rom; Marc Alaimo as Gul Dukat; Richard Beymer as Li Nalas; Michael Bell as Borum; Frank Langella (uncredited) as Minister Jaro; Leslie Bevis as Boslic Captain; Paul Nakauchi as Romah Doek

Episode chronology
← Previous "In the Hands of the Prophets"	Next → "The Circle"
- Star Trek: Deep Space Nine season 2

"The Homecoming" is the 21st episode of the American science fiction television series Star Trek: Deep Space Nine. It is the first of the franchise-first three-part episode story arc, and the first episode of the second season.

Set in the 24th century, the series follows the adventures on Deep Space Nine, a space station located near a stable wormhole between the Alpha and Gamma quadrants of the Milky Way Galaxy, in orbit of the planet Bajor. In this episode Kira rescues a Bajoran prisoner of war; meanwhile, an extremist group begins to take control of the planet Bajor.

== Plot ==
Quark gives Kira a Bajoran earring, which she immediately recognizes as belonging to Li Nalas, a Bajoran war hero long thought dead. Li is being held on the desert planet Cardassia IV, so Kira requests a runabout for a rescue mission. Sisko tells her he will consider it, but while he considers the matter, O'Brien discovers graffiti from an extremist faction called "The Circle", who want to expel all non-Bajorans from Bajor. Seeing this convinces Sisko that Bajor needs a leader like Li Nalas and he grants Kira the runabout.

Kira and O'Brien, disguising their runabout as a Lesseppian transport, travel to Cardassia IV and discover a labor camp with more than a dozen Bajorans. O'Brien pretends to solicit Kira to one of the soldiers, tricking him into lowering the force field that surrounds the camp. They rescue Li and several other prisoners. Before Kira and O'Brien return to DS9, Gul Dukat contacts Sisko to inform him that the Cardassian government has issued a formal apology and that the remaining prisoners are en route to Bajor. Bajor's provisional government, on the other hand, chastises Kira, because her actions might have resulted in war with Cardassia.

DS9's Bajoran population greets Li Nalas as a returning hero. Sisko and Kira urge him to help bring stability to Bajor, but shortly thereafter Li is caught trying to stow-away on a departing freighter. He relates to a puzzled Sisko that he never wanted to be a hero; he killed an unarmed Cardassian out of necessity in a purely chance encounter, and his fellow Bajorans eventually turned him into a legend. Sisko convinces Li to stay, because Bajor needs a legend like him.

After a trip to Bajor, Li Nalas returns with Minister Jaro Essa of the provisional government. The Chamber of Ministers has invented a new title for Li: "Navarch." It is unclear what this new title means; but Jaro announces that Li is now the Bajoran Liaison Officer to DS9 and Kira is to be sent back to Bajor.

== Reception ==
In 2013, Keith DeCandido gave the episode a rating of nine out of ten for Tor.com, calling it "an excellent start to a new season."

In 2015, Geek.com recommended this episode as "essential watching" for their abbreviated Star Trek: Deep Space Nine binge-watching guide, they noted that this episode is part of a trilogy that includes the first three episodes of the second season, ("The Homecoming", "The Circle", and "The Siege").

In 2018, SyFy recommended this episode for its abbreviated watch guide for the Bajoran character Kira Nerys, as a trilogy with the following two episodes. They note that in this episode a Bajoran extremist group is conducting attacks to challenge the new provisional Post-Occupation government of planet Bajor, forcing Kira to go all out to prevent a civil war.

== Notes ==
- This is the first part of a three-part story arc (the first in Star Trek franchise history) continued in "The Circle" and concluded with "The Siege".
- Frank Langella, who plays Minister Jaro, was uncredited in this and the following two episodes that he appears in.

== Releases ==
It was released on LaserDisc in Japan on June 6, 1997, as part of the half season collection 2nd Season Vol. 1, which had seven doubled sided 12" discs. The discs had English and Japanese audio tracks.

"The Homecoming" and "The Circle" were released on one double sided LaserDisc on July 15, 1997, in the United States.

This episode was released in 2017 on DVD with the complete series box set, which had 176 episodes on 48 discs.
