= Casey Biggs =

American actor (born 1955)

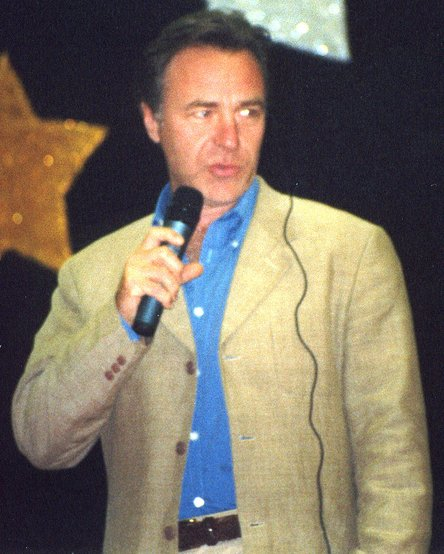
- Biggs in 2003
- Born: Casey Patrick Biggs; April 4, 1955 (age 71); Toledo, Ohio, U.S.
- Education: Juilliard School (BFA)
- Occupation: Actor
- Years active: 1978–present
- Known for: Damar (Star Trek: Deep Space Nine)
- Spouses: Roxann Dawson (m. 1985; div. 1987) Brigit Binns (m. 2004)

Casey Patrick Biggs (born April 4, 1955) is an American actor, best known throughout the Star Trek community for starring as the Cardassian Damar, on Star Trek: Deep Space Nine. He has appeared in over eighty film and television and stage productions.

== Early life ==
Biggs was born on April 4, 1955, in Toledo, Ohio. When he was very young, he was a foster child. He decided to pursue acting when he was a student at Central Catholic High School and graduated in 1973. He received a BFA from Juilliard in 1977; studied acting at the Toledo Repertory Theatre.

== Career ==
In January 1996, Biggs was in the made-for-TV movie A Promise to Carolyn. In 1996, he was nominated for the role of Damar in the science fiction show Star Trek: Deep Space Nine. Seemingly a minor character in his first appearance, Damar later became one of the major figures in the show, leading the entire Cardassian Union and having a major influence on the show's events. Biggs later returned to the Star Trek universe, making a guest appearance on Star Trek: Enterprise in the season 3 episode "Damage" as an Illyrian captain.

Biggs's other TV roles include the soap operas Ryan's Hope as Fenno Moore from 1988 to 1989, and General Hospital as Chad Wainwright in 1990. Another television role was on the 1990s TV series Stat. He has appeared in movies such as The Pelican Brief, Broken Arrow, Dragonfly and the Star Trek documentary Trekkies 2.

Biggs has made many guest appearances on TV shows, some of those appearances range from Father Dowling Mysteries, Matlock, The Young Riders, ER, Snoops, CSI: Miami, CSI: Crime Scene Investigation, Person of Interest and Crossing Jordan. In 2017 Biggs taught a class in directing and acting at The New School for Drama. Biggs appeared in the HBO docudrama Too Big To Fail on the 2008 financial crisis as Wells Fargo chairman Richard Kovacevich. In 2018, he returned to General Hospital as Dr. Lasaris.

== Personal life ==
Biggs was married to Roxann Dawson from 1985 to 1987. Dawson later played B'Elanna Torres in Star Trek: Voyager. Their marriage ended before either of them was cast in Star Trek.

== Filmography ==
=== Film ===
Casey Biggs film credits
Year	Title	Role	Notes	Ref.
1978	Death Drug	Melvin	Exploitation film directed by Oscar Williams	
1988	Alamo: The Price of Freedom	William Barret Travis	Short historical drama film directed by Kieth Merrill; Based on George A. McAlister's book of the same name	
1993	The Pelican Brief	Eric East	Legal political thriller directed, written, and co–produced by Alan J. Pakula; Based on the novel of the same name by John Grisham	
1995	Bodily Harm	Michael Cates	Thriller film directed by James Lemmo	
1996	Broken Arrow	Novacek	Action film directed by John Woo	
1997	Shadow Conspiracy	Stokes	Political thriller film directed by George P. Cosmatos	
2002	Dragonfly	Neil Darrow	Supernatural thriller film directed by Tom Shadyac	
2011	Too Big to Fail	Richard Kovacevich	Biographical drama television film directed by Curtis Hanson	
2022	Amsterdam	Augustus Vandenheuvel	Mystery comedy film directed by David O. Russell	

=== Television ===
Casey Biggs television credits
Year	Title	Role	Notes	Ref.
1978	Flying High	Dale	TV movie. Peter H. Hunt (Director)	
1978	The Great Wallendas	Gene Hallow	TV movie. Larry Elikann (Director)	
1978	The Beasts Are on the Streets	Rick	TV movie. Peter R. Hunt (Director)	
1978–1979	Flying High	Dale	3 episodes	
1980	Brave New World	Beta lighthouse guard	TV movie. Burt Brinckerhoff (Director), based on Aldous Huxley's novel	
1985	America's Musical Theater	Bill Cracker	Episode: "Happy End"	
1985	The Equalizer	Mason	Episode: "The Equalizer" (Pilot)	
1989	Ryan's Hope	Fenno Moore	Contract role	
1989	Father Dowling Mysteries	Charles	Episode: "The Pretty Baby Mystery"	
1989	Matlock	Ernie D'Amato	Episodes: "The Hunting Party" Parts 1 & 2	
1989	The Young Riders	Richard Gentry	Episode: "Blind Love"	
1990	Appearances	Harry Trace	TV movie. Win Phelps (Director)	
1990	General Hospital	Chad Wainwright		
1991	Shades of L.A.	Boyd Hoagland	Episode: "Dead Dogs Tell No Tales"	
1991	Line of Fire: The Morris Dees Story	Lee	TV movie. John Korty (Director)	
1991	Jake and the Fatman	Ruben Aragon	Episode: "Pretty Baby"	
1991	Stat	Dr. Lewis "Cowboy" Doniger	2 episodes. (remake of A.E.S. Hudson Street)	
1994	One Woman's Courage	Barry Cameron	TV movie. Charles Robert Carner (Director)	
1994	Melrose Place	(credit only)	Episode: "It's a Bad World After All"	
1994	Murder, She Wrote	Max Charles	Episode: "Dear Deadly"	
1994	The Last Chance Detectives: Mystery Lights of Navajo Mesa	John Fowler	TV movie. Stephen Stiles (Director)	
1995	Live Shot	Lt. Larry Levinstein	Episode: "Day One"	
1996	A Promise to Carolyn	Travis Colton	TV movie. Jerry London (Director)	
1996	Profiler	Senator Jameson Hunt	Episode: "I'll Be Watching You"	
1996	The Last Chance Detectives: Escape from Fire Lake	Dad	TV movie. Stephen Stiles (Director)	
1996–1999	Star Trek: Deep Space Nine	Damar	20 episodes from: "Return to Grace" (S4.E13) to: "What You Leave Behind" (S7.E25)	
1997	Star Trek: Deep Space Nine	Damar (hologram)	2 episodes "Statistical Probabilities" (S6.E9) "In The Pale Moonlight" (S6.E19)	
1997	Martin	Mr. Rollins (as Casey Bigg)	Episode: "California, Here We Come: Part 1"	
1997	Two Voices	Joshua Norton	TV movie. Peter Levin (Director)	
1998	Star Trek: Deep Space Nine	Damar / Dr. Wykoff	Episode: "Shadows and Symbols" (S7.E2)	
1999	Touched by an Angel	Dr. Duncan Danzig	1 episode	
2001	The X-Files	Saksa	1 episode	
2004	Star Trek: Enterprise	Illyrian Captain	Episode: "Damage"	
2011	The Good Wife	Ryan Fancis	1 episode	
2012	Major Crimes	Brian Barlow	Episode: "Citizens Arrest"	
2012	Shameless	David	Episode: “Summertime”	
2013	Elementary	Alan Becker	Episode: "Blood is Thicker"	
2013	The Mentalist	Mr. Bonner	Episode: "Wedding in Red" (S6:E3)	
2014	Person of Interest	Ken Davis	Episode: "Allegiance"	
2018–present	General Hospital	Dr. Lasaris		
2019	Madam Secretary	Mr. Champlin	Episode: "Strategic Ambiguity" (S5:E12)	
2023	The Rookie	Ed Teska	Episode: "S.T.R."	
