= Philip Anglim =

American actor

- Occupation: Actor
- Years active: 1973–present

Philip Anglim is an American actor best known for his performances as John Merrick in the stage and television versions of The Elephant Man, a role for which he received a Best Actor nomination in the 1979 Tony Awards. Other roles include the title role in Macbeth on Broadway and Dane O'Neill in the television mini-series The Thorn Birds. He also had a recurring role as Vedek Bareil on the series Star Trek: Deep Space Nine.

== Biography ==
Anglim was born and raised in San Francisco, California to Paule Anglim, an art dealer mother of French-Jewish descent, and Charles Anglim, a Catholic of Irish descent who worked as a patent attorney. He originally aspired to become a veterinarian, but was bitten by the acting bug while in college. Anglim graduated with a bachelor's degree in English literature from Yale University in 1973. Failing to gain admission to an acting conservatory, he returned to San Francisco and joined American Conservatory Theater. Subsequently, Anglim spent a year in Connecticut at the Southbury Playhouse.

His feature film debut was in The All-American Boy (1973), and his first television appearance was in the PBS miniseries The Adams Chronicles (1976). In 1979, while still an unknown, Anglim optioned the London play The Elephant Man and debuted off-Broadway, in the title role, at St. Peter's Church in the Citigroup Center in mid-town Manhattan, winning the Obie Award for best actor for his performance. He later moved with the production to Booth Theatre on Broadway in 1979, where it earned three Tony Awards and three Drama Desk Awards, including best/outstanding play; Anglim was nominated for a Tony and won a Drama Desk Award, an Outer Circle Critics Award and a Theatre World Award. He performed as Macbeth on Broadway at the Vivian Beaumont Theatre. in 1981 and again on TV in 1982. In 1982, Anglim appeared in the ABC television version of The Elephant Man for which he was nominated for an Emmy Award and a Golden Globe Award for Best Actor. He continued in theatre, co-starring as Rene Gallimard in a tour of M. Butterfly in 1991 among other roles.

His television work includes the main role of Dane O'Neill in the television mini-series The Thorn Birds and the recurring role of Vedek Bareil in Star Trek: Deep Space Nine He has also appeared in film roles.

Anglim owns a cattle farm in Tennessee and is the founder of The Lewis County Children's Fund, which help children in the area.

== Credits ==
=== Theater ===
- What the Butler Saw, 1975, Cincinnati
- The Contrast, 1975, Cincinnati
- Snow White, 1976, New York
- The Elephant Man, 1979, Broadway
- Macbeth, 1981, Broadway

=== Film/television ===
- The Elephant Man (1982) as John Merrick
- Testament (1983) as Hollis
- Malone (1987) as Harvey
- Haunted Summer (1988) as Lord Byron
- The Man Inside (1990) as Rolf Gruel
- The Thorn Birds as Dane O'Neill
- Dallas reunion War of the Ewings
- Millennium episode "Sacrament"
- Macbeth (title role)

=== Star Trek: Deep Space Nine appearances ===
- "In the Hands of the Prophets"
- "The Circle"
- "The Siege"
- "Shadowplay"
- "The Collaborator"
- "Fascination"
- "Life Support"
- "Resurrection"

== Awards ==
All of the following were for his performance in The Elephant Man:

- 1979 Outstanding Actor in a Play, Drama Desk Award
- 1979 nomination for Best Actor, Tony Awards
- 1979 Theatre World Award
- 1978–1979 OBIE Award Performance
- 1982 nomination, Emmy Award
- 1982 nomination, Golden Globe
