= Rapture (Star Trek: Deep Space Nine) =

- Star Trek: Deep Space Nine episode
- Episode no.: Season 5 Episode 10
- Directed by: Jonathan West
- Story by: L. J. Strom
- Teleplay by: Hans Beimler
- Production code: 508
- Original air date: December 30, 1996

Guest appearances
- Penny Johnson as Kasidy Yates; Ernest Perry Jr. as Admiral Whatley; Louise Fletcher as Kai Winn; Mark Allen Shepherd as Morn

Episode chronology
← Previous "The Ascent"	Next → "The Darkness and the Light"
- Star Trek: Deep Space Nine season 5

"Rapture" is the tenth episode of the fifth season, and the 108th episode overall, of the science fiction television series Star Trek: Deep Space Nine. Its premiere was watched by 5.8 million people.

Set in the 24th century, the series follows the adventures of the crew of the space station Deep Space Nine near the planet Bajor, as the Bajorans recover from a decades-long occupation by the imperialistic Cardassians. The station is adjacent to a wormhole that is home to powerful alien beings worshiped by the Bajorans as the "Prophets", and who have made Benjamin Sisko, the human commanding officer of DS9, their "Emissary" to the Bajorans. In this episode, as Bajor prepares to join the United Federation of Planets, Sisko experiences visions from the Prophets that allow him to discover a lost Bajoran city; meanwhile Sisko's girlfriend Kasidy Yates is released from prison.

This episode features guest stars Penny Johnson Jerald and Louise Fletcher in their recurring roles of Kasidy Yates and Bajoran spiritual leader Kai Winn; Ernest Perry Jr. also guest stars as the Federation's Admiral Whatley. It is the first episode to feature the new design for Starfleet uniforms introduced in the film Star Trek: First Contact, which had been released a month before this episode aired.

== Plot ==
When Sisko sees a painting depicting B'hala, Bajor's legendary lost city, he is inspired to search for the sacred site. The painting depicts an obelisk that, according to legend, marked the city's coordinates. Sisko recreates the obelisk in a holosuite to try to determine what the hidden markings might be. A short circuit in the holosuite system briefly knocks him unconscious. Dr. Bashir tells Sisko his brain has been overloaded, and his senses will be enhanced for a few days; he warns him to return to the infirmary if he experiences any side effects. At dinner, Sisko absentmindedly cuts his fruit into shapes which he realizes are the missing markings from the obelisk.

Meanwhile, Sisko receives news that Bajor has been accepted into the Federation, and the signing ceremony will be held on Deep Space Nine.

Back in the holosuite, Sisko has a vision of B'hala, during which he briefly understands all of Bajor's history and can see its future. Soon, Kasidy Yates is released from prison, and Sisko tells her he has located B'hala and invites her to accompany him to Bajor to find it. On Bajor, Sisko is stricken with a painful headache, but he soon brings Kasidy to the ruins of B'hala.

The Bajorans regard Sisko's discovery as a miracle and, for the skeptics, confirmation that he truly is the Emissary. When Sisko gets home, he seems to have psychic powers; he has a vision of a swarm of locusts passing by Bajor and attacking Cardassia. Bashir determines that Sisko's headaches are life-threatening and asks to operate immediately. Sisko refuses, unwilling to put a stop to his visions. With Kai Winn's help, he consults the mystical Orb of Prophecy.

The ceremony for Bajor's admittance to the Federation begins without Sisko. Sisko bursts in, weak and in pain, and warns that if Bajor joins the Federation now, it will be destroyed. The Bajorans vote to delay joining the Federation.

Sisko is rushed to the infirmary, where Bashir reports that he must operate immediately to save his life. Since Sisko himself refused the operation, his son Jake, as the next-of-kin, must decide his father's fate. Unwilling to let his father die, Jake permits the operation. Sisko awakens to anguish at the loss of his visions. Kasidy reminds him that while he has lost something very important to him, what he saved—his life with his son—is even more precious.

== Reception ==
Tor.com gave the episode nine out of ten.
