= Emissary (Star Trek: Deep Space Nine) =

First episode of Star Trek: Deep Space Nine

- Star Trek: Deep Space Nine episodes
- Episode nos.: Season 1 Episodes 1 and 2
- Directed by: David Carson
- Story by: Rick Berman; Michael Piller
- Teleplay by: Michael Piller
- Production codes: 721; 401 and 402
- Original air date: January 3, 1993

Guest appearances
- Patrick Stewart as Capt. Jean-Luc Picard / Locutus; Camille Saviola as Kai Opaka; Felecia M. Bell as Jennifer Sisko; Marc Alaimo as Gul Dukat; Joel Swetow as Gul Jasad; Aron Eisenberg as Nog; Stephen Davies as Tactical Officer; Max Grodénchik as Ferengi pit boss (Rom); Lily Mariye as Operations officer; J. G. Hertzler as Vulcan Captain; April Grace as Enterprise Transporter Chief; Kevin McDermott as Baseball Player; Frank Owen Smith as Curzon Dax; Thomas Hobson as Young Jake Sisko; Judi Durand as Cardassian Computer Voice; Majel Barrett as Starfleet Computer Voice

Episode chronology
← Previous —	Next → "Past Prologue"
- Star Trek: Deep Space Nine season 1

"Emissary" is the series premiere of the American science fiction television series Star Trek: Deep Space Nine. It was aired as a single two-hour episode on its initial broadcast, but was divided into two one-hour episodes when it aired in reruns.

Set in the 24th century, the series follows the adventures on Deep Space Nine, a space station located near the planet Bajor, as the Bajorans recover from a brutal decades-long occupation by the imperialistic Cardassians. In this premiere episode, Commander Benjamin Sisko (Avery Brooks) and his son Jake (Cirroc Lofton) arrive with Starfleet personnel on the station shortly after Cardassian occupation forces have departed. While working to repair the station and assist the Bajoran people, Sisko discovers an unprecedented wormhole connecting Bajor to the distant, unexplored Gamma Quadrant of the galaxy and the mysterious, incorporeal beings that inhabit it.

== Plot ==
=== Part I ===
During the Battle of Wolf 359, Starfleet is under attack by the alien hive mind known as the Borg, which has temporarily assimilated the human Starfleet captain Jean-Luc Picard. The battle is a rout, and Lieutenant Commander Benjamin Sisko - executive officer of the U.S.S. Saratoga - orders his crew to abandon ship. He rushes through the crumbling ship to find his son Jake and wife Jennifer buried under a pile of rubble. He saves Jake and tries to rescue Jennifer but she is already dead, and he is forced to leave her behind as the ship is destroyed.

Three years later, Commander Sisko is assigned to command space station Deep Space Nine in orbit of the planet Bajor. He finds the station in ruins with many inhabitants leaving and the rest struggling to rebuild the station. Bajor has won independence from Cardassian occupation and invited Starfleet to assist in their recovery, much to the disgust of Major Kira Nerys, the station's Bajoran first officer. Sisko strongarms the Ferengi Quark into staying on at the station. Meanwhile, Sisko is contemplating resigning from Starfleet. He receives orders from Captain Jean-Luc Picard — he is to prepare Bajor for membership in the United Federation of Planets — and can barely contain his hostility toward the man he blames for Jennifer's death.

Desperate to unify a Bajoran people whose government is on the verge of collapse, Sisko visits the Bajoran spiritual leader Kai Opaka, who shows him an orb that the Bajorans believe was sent by their gods, "the Prophets". Opaka calls Sisko the "Emissary" and tells him he is destined to discover the Prophets' home, the Celestial Temple. Sisko's science officer, Lt. Jadzia Dax, determines that the orb is connected to mysterious phenomena in the nearby Denorios Belt.

Sisko receives an unwelcome visit from Gul Dukat, the Cardassian former commander of the station; Dukat unsubtly makes it clear he's looking for the orb Sisko was given. Seeking to investigate the Denorios Belt without the Cardassians following, Sisko concocts a ruse that allows the station's security chief, Odo, to temporarily disable Dukat's warship.

=== Part II ===
Dax and Sisko investigate the Denorios Belt in a runabout, discovering a wormhole leading to the Gamma Quadrant on the opposite side of the galaxy. As they attempt to return, Dax is teleported back to Deep Space Nine, while Sisko remains in the wormhole.

Kira, recognizing the wormhole's value, orders the station moved to its mouth. Dukat enters the wormhole, but the station's staff are unable to follow, as the wormhole seemingly disappears after Dukat enters it. Cardassian ships arrive to investigate Dukat's disappearance, assuming he has been killed. Disbelieving Kira's claims about the wormhole, they order Kira to surrender DS9 or be destroyed. Kira bluffs that the station is heavily armed.

Sisko encounters entities in the wormhole who have no understanding of corporeal and linear existence. When Dukat's ship attempts to pass through, they close the wormhole, irritated by the presence of corporeal lifeforms. When Sisko attempts to explain linear time, the entities point out that he continually returns to the moment of Jennifer's death. Sisko realizes he is "living in the past" by not moving on from his grief.

The Cardassians attack Deep Space Nine, but as Kira prepares to surrender, the wormhole opens up, with Sisko's runabout towing Dukat's ship from it, and the Cardassians stop their attack. Sisko reveals that he negotiated with the wormhole aliens to allow ships to pass through. Later, Sisko informs Picard that he plans to remain in Starfleet, letting go of his anger and making peace with Picard, who wishes him luck.

== Reception ==
"Emissary" first aired on January 3, 1993. It received a Nielsen rating of 18.8 percent, placing first in its time slot and becoming the highest rated episode of the season. According to Variety, "Emissary" was the highest-rated syndicated series premiere in history at the time of its broadcast. It achieved the top spots in number of television markets on its debut.

Tom Bierbaum of Variety called the script a mixed bag, "too complex and ambitious at times but generally admirable in its mix of deft characterization, old-fashioned space opera and sophisticated science-fiction concepts."

In 2012, Zack Handlen of The A.V. Club pointed out there were several significant differences compared to previous Star Trek shows. For instance, he noted the primary protagonist was an "angry man" with a tragic backstory, and commended the fact that the main characters were a more "disparate ensemble" with conflicting viewpoints, neither of which were featured in past installments in the franchise. Handlen reacted positively to the new characters, calling them "fascinating individuals", while complaining of a few instances of poor acting and writing. He disliked the scenes involving the magical orbs and wormhole aliens, finding them unnecessary. Handlen concluded his review by saying that, of the Star Trek pilots, this was "the one most rife with possibility" he had seen.

In 2013, Keith DeCandido reviewed "Emissary" for Tor.com, writing that while the episode served its purpose to set up elements of the series, "as a story, it doesn’t have much life to it". He called the characters the episode's most compelling aspect, saying "it's a refreshing change to have characters with a bit more acid in them". He gave the episode a score of six out of ten.

A 2015 binge-watching guide for Star Trek: Deep Space Nine by Wired recommended not skipping this essential episode.

In 2015, Geek.com recommended this episode as "essential watching" for their abbreviated Star Trek: Deep Space Nine binge-watching guide, along with "Past Prologue", "Vortex", "Battle Lines", "Duet" and "In the Hands of the Prophets" from season one.

In 2016, SyFy ranked "Emissary" as the best out of the six main Star Trek TV show pilots.

In 2016, Vox rated this episode one of the top 25 essential episodes of all Star Trek.

In 2018, CBR ranked the "Emissary" two-part episode as the 19th best multi-episode story of Star Trek overall. The Hollywood Reporter ranked "Emissary" of Star Trek: Deep Space Nine as the fourth best presentation of the series. In 2017, GameSpot ranked this as the second best pilot episode of a Star Trek series.

In 2018, SyFy included this episode on their binge-watching guide for episodes featuring Jadzia Dax.

Space.com ranked "Emissary" the seventh best episode of all Star Trek television.

In 2019, ComicBook.com ranked "Emissary" the tenth best episode of Star Trek: Deep Space Nine.

SciFiNow ranked this one of the top ten episodes of Star Trek: Deep Space Nine in 2020, describing it as an "excellent pilot" establishing the character of Benjamin Sisko as "a man with a deep sense of duty and grief".

== Accolades ==
"Emissary" was nominated for four Emmy Awards. It won in the category "Outstanding Individual Achievement in Special Visual Effects" and was also nominated in the categories "Outstanding Individual Achievement in Art Direction for a Series", "Outstanding Individual Achievement in Sound Editing for a Series", and "Outstanding Individual Achievement in Sound Mixing for a Drama Series". It also received Emmy nominations for Best Sound Editing and Sound Mixing. Composer Dennis McCarthy also won for his Outstanding Individual Achievement in main title music.

== Broadcast and streaming ==
It was aired as a two-hour-long pilot in broadcast syndication. On its debut, "Emissary" received a lot of attention, including interviews with cast and production staff and a feature on Entertainment Tonight.

The two-hour-long version of the episode has a production code of 721. It may also be aired as two roughly 45-minute episodes, with production codes 401 and 402. The two-hour-long version was premiered as a television movie, and on later airings it was separated into "Emissary, Part I" and "Emissary, Part II".

On the launch of the Paramount+ streaming service, on March 4, 2021, a free Star Trek marathon was presented, featuring the pilots of the various Star Trek television series, including "Emissary". The marathon started at 7 am PT/10 am ET and was Live streamed on the YouTube internet video platform on that day, with "Emissary" airing at 9:59 am PT / 12:59 pm ET.

== Home video releases ==
The first home media release of the episode was on VHS cassette in the United States on September 10, 1996. It was part of the initial launch of cassettes by Paramount Home Video which saw the first six episodes released and was on a single episode cassette. It was released on DVD as part of the season one box set on June 3, 2003.

This episode was released in 2017 on DVD with the complete series box set, which had 176 episodes on 48 discs.

"Emissary" parts I and II were released on September 24, 1996, on LaserDisc in the United States. Released by Paramount Home Video, the double sided 12 inch optical disc had a run time of 87 minutes.

On February 8, 1997, this episode was released on LaserDisc in Japan as part of the half-season box set 1st Season Vol. 1. This included episodes from "Emissary" to "Move Along Home" with both English and Japanese audio tracks.

"Emissary" was released on PAL-format LaserDisc in the United Kingdom as part of The Pilots collection, in April 1996. This included the color version of "The Cage", "Where No Man Has Gone Before", "Encounter at Farpoint", "Emissary" and "Caretaker", with a total runtime of 379 minutes.
