= List of Star Trek: Deep Space Nine characters =

This is a list of characters from the science fiction television series Star Trek: Deep Space Nine. Only characters who played a significant major role in the series are listed.

Star Trek: Deep Space Nine was a science fiction television show of the Star Trek franchise that aired between 1993 and 1999. Many of the characters appear in other programs and films comprising the wider Star Trek science fiction universe.

== Main characters ==
=== Benjamin Sisko ===
Benjamin Sisko (played by Avery Brooks) is the Starfleet officer placed in charge of Deep Space Nine, a formerly Cardassian space station orbiting Bajor. The Bajorans, having liberated themselves from a long, brutal Cardassian occupation of their planet, invite the Federation to jointly administer the station. Sisko and Jadzia Dax accidentally discover nearby the first known stable wormhole, which not only provides two-way quick access to the previously distant, unexplored Gamma Quadrant, but is also considered by the Bajorans to be the home of their gods, the Prophets ("Emissary"). These two factors greatly magnify the station's importance.

The Bajorans consider him the most recent Emissary of the Prophets, which gives him enormous prestige and influence with them. At first uncomfortable with his unwanted status, he eventually comes to accept it. (It is later revealed that his birth was arranged by the Prophets.) In his dual role, he leads the fight against the enemies of Bajor and the Federation.

=== Odo ===
The security chief of the station, Odo (René Auberjonois) is a Changeling, a being able to shapeshift. Found by the Bajorans, he was subjected to painful testing by a Bajoran scientist while growing up. During the Cardassian occupation, Odo was a law enforcement officer aboard the station, doing his best to be even-handed and impartial, despite the circumstances.

He is the nemesis of Quark, the Ferengi owner of a bar/nightclub on the station during and after the occupation. Odo gradually falls in love with Kira Nerys, the Bajoran liaison officer and Sisko's second-in-command, and she with him.

He finally discovers that his people are the Founders, the iron-fisted rulers of the Dominion, a very powerful state in the Gamma Quadrant. The Founders distrust all "solids" and have already subjugated many races. They go to war with the Federation and its allies, testing Odo's loyalties.

=== Julian Bashir ===
Julian Bashir (initially credited as Siddig El Fadil, then as Alexander Siddig) is a Starfleet lieutenant and the station's chief medical officer. When he was a child, his parents had him illegally genetically engineered to enhance him both physically and mentally, as he was falling behind his classmates. He is best friends with engineering officer Miles O'Brien and befriends the enigmatic Garak, the sole Cardassian resident. He is manipulated by and fights against Section 31, a highly secretive group within Starfleet that engages in illegal activities on behalf of the Federation.

=== Jadzia/Ezri Dax ===
Dax is a Trill symbiont, who has been "joined" to various humanoid Trills, both male and female, over the course of its long lifetime, sharing their bodies. Prior to Jadzia, the Dax symbiont had been hosted by Lela, Tobin, Emony, Audrid, Torias, Joran, and Curzon.

Jadzia, Sisko's science officer, is Dax's host for the first six seasons. When Terry Farrell, the actress who portrayed her, left the show, Jadzia was killed by the Cardassian Dukat, and the symbiont transferred to Ezri (Nicole de Boer). Jadzia marries Worf shortly before she is murdered, while Ezri is attracted to Dr. Bashir.

Curzon, the roguish male host immediately prior to Jadzia, was Benjamin Sisko's mentor and close friend. Sisko occasionally calls Jadzia and Ezri "Old Man", despite neither of them being old or a man, in remembrance of this.

The Dax character appears most recently in the series Starfleet Academy Series 1, Episode 5. Starfleet academy is set in the 32nd Century and the new host of the Dax symbiont is Professor Illa Dax, played by Tawny Newsome. The episode also includes a conversation with a holographic version of Jake Sisko, played by Cirroc Lofton.

=== Jake Sisko ===
Jake (Cirroc Lofton) is Benjamin Sisko's teenage son. His best friend is the Ferengi Nog. Choosing not to follow his father's footsteps and join Starfleet, he becomes a writer and (during the Dominion War) a war correspondent.

=== Miles O'Brien ===
Miles O'Brien (Colm Meaney) is the station's chief of operations, transferring over from Star Trek: The Next Generation's starship Enterprise in the first episode. He becomes best friends with Julian Bashir. He is married to Keiko, a botanist who works as a schoolteacher on the station; they have two children.

=== Quark ===
Quark (Armin Shimerman) is the longtime Ferengi owner of a bar/casino/holosuite arcade on Deep Space Nine. Sisko persuades him to remain and keep his establishment running after the Cardassians are forced out. Like most Ferengi, he pursues profit by any means, legal or otherwise. This frequently brings him into conflict with Odo. Sisko, on the other hand, occasionally finds his services and information useful.

=== Kira Nerys ===
Major, later Colonel, Kira Nerys (Nana Visitor) is the Bajoran liaison officer and Sisko's second-in-command on the station. During the Cardassian occupation, she became an effective guerrilla fighter. At first, she is hostile to Federation involvement, but gradually changes her mind. A devout woman, she initially finds it difficult working for a commander who is also the Emissary of the Prophets, but comes to completely trust and respect Sisko. She has some romantic involvements with fellow Bajorans, but eventually learns of Odo's love for her, and reciprocates.

=== Worf ===
Worf (Michael Dorn) is a Starfleet officer transferred to Deep Space Nine after having served aboard the Enterprise under Captain Jean-Luc Picard. He is the station's Strategic Operations Officer. A Klingon raised by human foster parents after being orphaned, he became the first Starfleet officer of his species. He faces difficulties and divided loyalties as a result. After helping Gowron become Chancellor of the Klingon Empire in Star Trek: The Next Generation, Worf later kills him in a duel when Gowron endangers the Empire in the Dominion War for his own personal motives. Worf and Jadzia Dax eventually develop a romantic relationship and get married, though she is soon after murdered by Gul Dukat.

== Recurring characters ==
=== Bareil Antos ===
Bareil Antos (Philip Anglim) is a Bajoran Vedek.

He first appears in the episode "In the Hands of the Prophets" in the first season, where he is introduced as a Bajoran religious leader, and the target of an assassination plot. Bareil becomes a recurring character who has a romantic relationship with Major Kira Nerys, a subplot that begins at the start of season 2 and concludes with his death in "Life Support".

He runs against Vedek Winn Adami for the position of Kai, the religious leader of Bajor, but drops out to protect the reputation of the previous Kai, Opaka. Bareil is injured in a shuttle explosion, and Dr. Julian Bashir has to replace his failing organs with cybernetics so that he can continue to advise Winn in vital negotiations with the Cardassians. His continued efforts in this weakened state cause brain damage, and eventually his death.

In the mirror universe episode "Resurrection", the Bareil from that universe is a petty thief who is close to the alternate Kira, the evil commander of the space station. He attempts to steal one of the Prophets' orbs in this universe.

=== Brunt ===
Brunt (Jeffrey Combs) is a liquidator with the Ferengi Commerce Authority. He is the nemesis of Quark, whom he perceives as a threat to the Ferengi way of life, and often attempts to either destroy him or to supplant Grand Nagus Zek (although at one time, he does help Quark rescue Ishka from the Dominion). By sharp contrast, his mirror universe counterpart is a friendly and congenial person, with unrequited feelings for his universe's Ezri Tigan, who ends up being murdered by the Intendant (mirror Kira Nerys).

=== Kimara Cretak ===
Kimara Cretak is a senator and representative of the Romulan empire for a short time aboard Deep Space Nine. She is accused of treason against the Star Empire and found guilty in the episode "Inter Arma Enim Silent Leges." The ending of the episode leaves her fate ambiguous, with it unclear if she will be imprisoned or executed. Cretak was first portrayed by Megan Cole in "Image in the Sand" and "Shadows and Symbols," and Adrienne Barbeau in "Inter Arma Enim Silent Leges."

=== Damar ===
Damar (Casey Biggs) is a Cardassian military officer. He serves under Gul Dukat and later becomes his aide when the Cardassian Union joins the Dominion. Damar discovers a way to disable the Federation's self-replicating mines protecting Deep Space Nine, which had been preventing the Dominion from sending reinforcements from the Gamma Quadrant through the wormhole. As the Federation retakes the station, Damar learns that Tora Ziyal, Dukat's half-Bajoran daughter, had been helping Kira and others undermine them, and kills her.

After Dukat's mental breakdown following his daughter's death, Damar is promoted, first to gul and then to legate. As the leader of Cardassia, he gradually comes to resent the Dominion's demotion of Cardassia and sacrifice of Cardassian soldiers during its war to conquer the Alpha Quadrant. He finally switches sides and calls upon his people to fight the Dominion. He accepts Federation aid and advice from an expert on guerrilla warfare, Colonel Kira Nerys. During desperate fighting to capture the Dominion's headquarters on Cardassia Prime, Damar is killed in action.

Damar appeared in 23 episodes, beginning with season 4's "Return to Grace".

Producer Ira Behr hired Biggs, having seen him in the early IMAX film Alamo: The Price of Freedom.

=== Dukat ===
Dukat (Marc Alaimo) is a Cardassian officer and the former commander of Terok Nor, the Cardassian space station that is renamed Deep Space Nine following Cardassia's expulsion from Bajor. Kira Nerys hates him for his actions during the Cardassian occupation, but it is later revealed that Dukat and her mother were lovers.

Dukat becomes a key player in forming a Cardassian alliance with the Dominion and joins them in fighting against the Federation and Bajor. With the Dominion on the verge of losing the war, Dukat allies himself with the Pah-wraiths, the enemies of the Prophets, but is foiled by Sisko in his attempt to release them from their captivity and instead ends up joining them in eternal imprisonment.

In 2009, IGN ranked Dukat as the 15th best character of Star Trek overall, noting the character as a complicated and nuanced "bad guy". They note the character's morality in "Indiscretion", as well as his introduction in the premiere episode of Star Trek: Deep Space Nine, "Emissary".

In 2016, Screen Rant rated Dukat as the eighth best character in Star Trek overall as presented in television and film. Time rated Gul Dukat the fourth best villain of the Star Trek franchise in 2016.

In 2018, Comic Book Resources (CBR) ranked Gul Dukat the third best recurring character of all Star Trek.

=== Michael Eddington ===
Michael Eddington is a Starfleet lieutenant commander. He is stationed on Deep Space Nine as security officer, due to distrust of Odo. Following orders from a Starfleet admiral, he sabotages the Defiant's cloaking system when Captain Sisko defies orders and takes the ship to the Gamma Quadrant. On another occasion, he is instrumental in helping to recover the command staff of the station after a transporter malfunction.

Eddington later defects to the Maquis, a resistance group which refuses to abide by the Federation's ceding of their colonies to the Cardassians. He likens himself and Sisko to characters from Les Miserables (Jean Valjean and Javert, respectively), but is eventually captured and imprisoned. He is later killed while fighting alongside Sisko in a successful attempt to rescue survivors of a Maquis colony from the Dominion.

Michael Eddington was portrayed by Kenneth Marshall, appearing as a recurring character beginning in season 3's "The Search, Part I".

In 2018, CBR ranked Eddington the 17th best recurring character in Star Trek.

In 2016, the character was ranked as the 77th most important character in service to Starfleet within the Star Trek science fiction universe by Wired.

=== Vic Fontaine ===
Vic Fontaine (James Darren) is a holographic lounge singer in Quark's holosuites. He provides advice to various characters.

=== Elim Garak ===
Elim Garak (Andrew Robinson) is the only Cardassian to remain on Deep Space Nine after the Bajorans and Federation take charge. Though he claims to be a simple tailor, it is obvious that he is far more than that. He turns out to be a former top operative of the Obsidian Order, the powerful and feared Cardassian intelligence organization, and the illegitimate son of its longtime head, Enabran Tain. Disgraced for undisclosed reasons, he chose exile on Deep Space Nine.

Dr. Bashir and he become friends. He also proves very useful to Sisko from time to time, even arranging the assassination of a hostile visiting Romulan senator during the Dominion War in order to bring the then-neutral Romulan Empire into the war on the Federation side ("In the Pale Moonlight").

Garak unabashedly lies, constantly and smoothly, but remains deeply loyal to Cardassia. He risks his life fighting against the Dominion when it turns on Cardassia.

Garak was originally intended to appear in only a single episode, "Past Prologue," but Robinson's performance was so good that he was retained.

In 2015, Syfy rated Garak as among the top 21 most interesting supporting characters in Star Trek.

=== Gowron ===
Gowron (Robert O'Reilly) is a Klingon who is chosen leader of the Klingon Empire by Captain Jean Luc Picard in the Star Trek: The Next Generation episode "Reunion," and is featured in several episodes of Deep Space Nine.

He endangers the Empire by repeatedly trying to undermine Martok, one of his most effective generals in the Dominion War, considering him a rival. Worf is forced to challenge him to a duel and kills him.

In 2015, Syfy rated Gowron as among the top 21 most interesting supporting characters in Star Trek.

=== Ishka ===
Ishka (Andrea Martin, Cecily Adams) is the mother of Quark and Rom, who affectionately address her as "Moogie." She causes trouble for the family by wearing clothes and earning profit, two activities that are forbidden to female Ferengi, and is unrepentant about her actions when discovered by the Ferengi Commerce Authority. Later, she has a romantic relationship with Grand Nagus Zek, and eventually persuades him to begin changing the regulations that govern Ferengi business, with far-reaching consequences for that society.

Ishka was introduced in the season 3 episode "Family Business".

=== Leeta ===
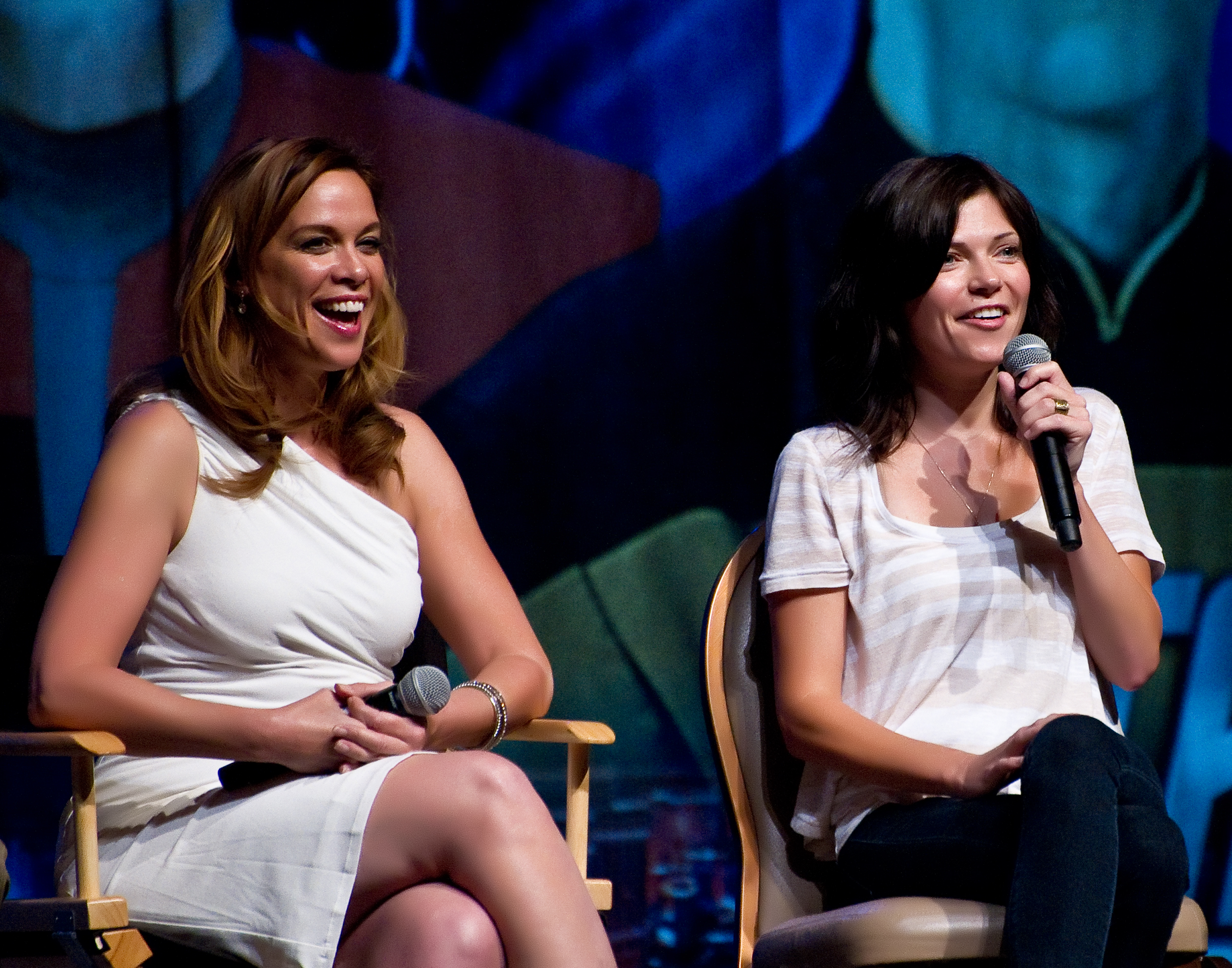
Chase Masterson (left) and Nicole De Boer at the Las Vegas Star Trek Convention, 2011

Leeta (Chase Masterson) is a recurring character (17 episodes) on Deep Space Nine. Introduced in season 3's "Explorers", she is a Bajoran employed as a dabo girl in Quark's bar. After a brief romantic relationship with Julian Bashir, she becomes involved with and eventually marries Rom.

Although initially played as a stereotypical "airhead", over the course of the series it is revealed that she is an intelligent woman who chooses to maintain a carefree attitude. She is a ringleader when Quark's employees attempt to start a trade union, and also volunteers to play temporary host to one of Jadzia Dax's former personalities.

Unlike most Bajoran characters, Leeta is never given a family name. The non-canon novels explain that this is because she was brought up in an orphanage during the Cardassian Occupation, and thus her family background is unknown.

In 2015, Syfy rated Leeta as among the top 21 most interesting supporting characters in Star Trek. In 2018, CBR ranked Leeta the seventh best recurring character in all of Star Trek.

=== Martok ===
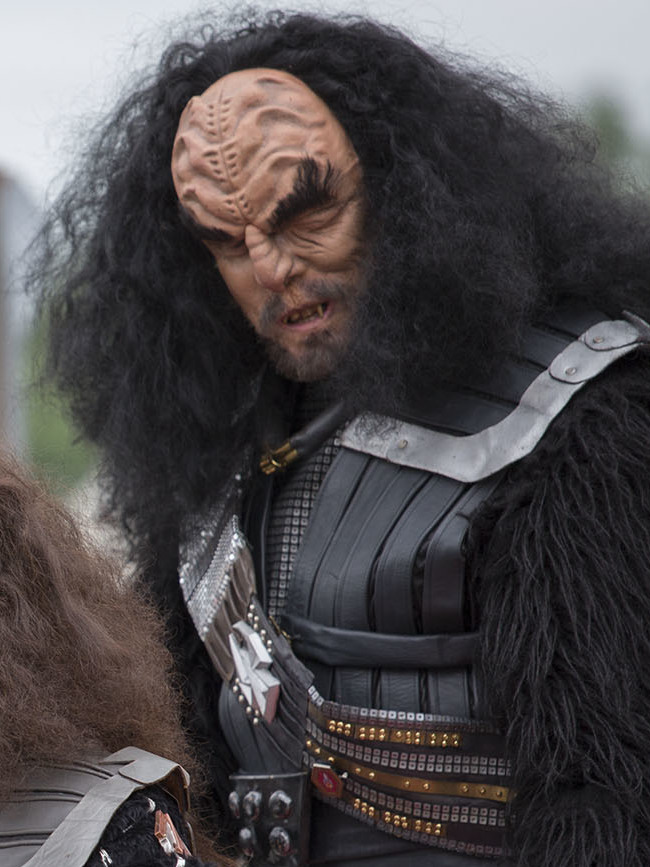
J. G. Hertzler at the Riverside Trek Fest, 2014

Martok (J. G. Hertzler) is a Klingon general who befriends Worf. When Worf kills Gowron to save the Klingon Empire, Martok nominates him for the next Chancellor of the Klingon Empire, but Worf instead acclaims him Chancellor. Martok was played by J. G. Hertzler.

Martok was introduced in the season 4 opener, "The Way of the Warrior".

In 2015, Syfy rated Martok among the top 21 most interesting supporting characters in Star Trek.

=== Mila ===
Mila (Julianna McCarthy), a female Cardassian, was for over three decades the housekeeper of Enabran Tain, the head of the Obsidian Order. She is killed by Dominion soldiers on the eve of Cardassia's liberation from the Dominion, while harboring Garak, Damar and Kira Nerys. She appeared in three episodes as well as in the novel A Stitch in Time by Andrew J. Robinson.

=== Mora Pol ===
Doctor Mora Pol (James Sloyan) is the Bajoran scientist who was assigned to study the Changeling Odo. He studied and taught Odo at the Bajoran Center for Science during the Occupation of Bajor from 2358 to 2365. When Odo assumed the shape of a humanoid, he imitated Dr. Mora's hairstyle.

Odo initially resented Dr. Mora for failing to realize he was sentient. Under pressure from the Cardassians to get answers and not fully understanding what he was dealing with, Dr. Mora used some questionable methods in his experiments. Odo left the institute two years later. They do not reconcile until 2373, when Dr. Mora arrives on Deep Space Nine to assist Odo in treating an infant changeling.

=== Morn ===
Morn (Mark Allen Shepherd) is a Lurian male, the first member of his species seen in the Star Trek universe. Morn is a frequent patron of Quark's bar. Morn is named after Norm Peterson, a character from the television series Cheers.

According to make-up designer Michael Westmore, on the first day of filming the director chose Morn randomly from among several prosthetic characters. Westmore went to great lengths to ensure that Morn could talk if the character ever had to, but Morn remained silent throughout the series. This became a running gag, with other characters commenting on how talkative he is. Morn is credited with knowing the funniest joke in the universe. Quark sometimes breaks down laughing when he tries to retell the joke, and always gives up, saying that no one can tell it like Morn. Morn's existence as a fixture at Quark's bar is mocked in the episode "Who Mourns for Morn?" when Quark sets up a holo-imager to project an image of Morn on his regular stool, quietly drinking. Mark Allen Shepherd plays a dual role in this episode: apart from his regular appearance as Morn, he played a Bajoran invited to sit in Morn's usual chair at the bar.

Often, other characters refer to something Morn has done that, to the viewer, would seem uncharacteristic for Morn. For example, when it became clear that war with the Dominion is inevitable, Morn throws a chair at Quark, then runs naked across the Promenade screaming, "We're all doomed!" Lieutenant Commander Worf claims that Morn is a formidable sparring partner, and the pair fight in the holosuites on a weekly basis. Jadzia Dax also says she nearly became romantic with Morn, except that Morn turned her down.

Very little is divulged about Morn or his species on the show. It was revealed in the episode "Who Mourns for Morn?" that he had been involved in some criminal activities, the most notable being a robbery in which his crew stole 1,000 bricks of gold-pressed latinum.

Morn also appeared in the Star Trek: The Next Generation episode "Birthright, Part I", made a cameo in the Star Trek: Voyager episode "Caretaker." He also makes a cameo in the animated series Star Trek: Lower Decks. Because of these appearances, this has made Morn one of the few characters to appear in three or more of the Star Trek series, alongside Quark (who appeared in TNG, DS9, Voyager and Lower Decks), William Riker (TNG, DS9 [as a clone created by a transporter accident], Voyager, Enterprise, Lower Decks and Picard), Jean-Luc Picard (TNG, DS9 and Picard), Deanna Troi (TNG, Voyager, Enterprise and Picard), Kang (The Original Series, DS9 and Voyager), Q (TNG, DS9, Voyager, Lower Decks and Picard), and Geordi La Forge (TNG, Voyager [as Captain La Forge], and Picard).

=== Nog ===
Nog (Aron Eisenberg) is Rom's son. He develops a close friendship with Jake Sisko throughout the series.

Working at the station's bar at first, Nog later becomes the first Ferengi to join Starfleet ("Facets"), to the disapproval of his uncle, Quark. He is ultimately promoted to the rank of lieutenant, junior grade by Sisko during the final episode of the series, "What You Leave Behind".

=== Keiko O'Brien ===
Keiko O'Brien (Rosalind Chao) is a botanist and the wife of Miles O'Brien in both Star Trek: The Next Generation and Star Trek: Deep Space Nine. When an accident endangers her and her unborn second child, Doctor Bashir saves them both by removing the fetus and implanting it into Kira Nerys' womb. After the war, the O'Brien family relocates to Earth, when Miles accepts the position of instructor at Starfleet Academy.

=== Molly O'Brien ===
Molly O'Brien (Hana Hatae) is the first child of Keiko and Miles O'Brien. She originally appeared on Star Trek: The Next Generation, born in 2368 in the TNG episode "Disaster".

In the DS9 episode "Time's Orphan," the O'Briens go on a picnic to Golana IV, where Molly accidentally falls into an abandoned time portal and emerges as an 18-year-old (played by Michelle Krusiec). From her point of view, she experiences approximately ten years of solitary existence. Eventually the adult Molly helps her child counterpart return home, erasing the adult Molly from history in the process.

=== Opaka ===
Opaka (Camille Saviola) was the Kai or spiritual leader of the Bajorans through the latter years of the Cardassian Occupation and the first few months after it ended in 2369. Opaka recognizes Sisko as the latest Emissary of the Prophets. During the Occupation, Opaka had given away the whereabouts of a rebel base to the Cardassians, and her son was killed in the subsequent attack, in order to save thousands of other Bajoran lives. Later on, Bareil Antos drops out of the election for Kai in an effort to keep this secret from destroying Opaka's legacy. This leads to Winn Adami becoming Kai.

In response to a prophetic Orb experience, Opaka leaves Bajor for the first time to pay an unannounced visit to DS9. Journeying with Sisko and Kira through the wormhole, she is killed in a crash on the Ennis penal moon, but is resurrected by artificial microbes present there. The microbes are specifically designed to work only on the moon. Given the opportunity to leave, she instead decides to remain and help end the prisoners' perpetual civil war.

=== Rom ===
Rom (Max Grodénchik) is Quark's brother. An atypical Ferengi, he does not have the "lobes" for business, but is a highly skilled engineer and a loving and supportive father to his son Nog.

In 2015, SyFy rated Rom as among the top 21 most interesting supporting characters in Star Trek. In 2013, Wired said that Rom was arguably the best character in Star Trek: Deep Space Nine, and even in the entire Star Trek franchise. They praised how Max Grodénchik brought the character to life, presenting a nuanced and layered character over the seven-season run, and noted how Rom transforms from a comedic sidekick for Quark to a character that was much more important to the series. In 2021, Julian Beauvais, writing for Screen Rant, thought that Rom was an honorable character for trying to take care of his family, using his engineering abilities to help defeat the Dominion during the war, and as Grand Nagus planning to reform Ferengi society to be more egalitarian.

=== William J. Ross ===
Vice Admiral William J. Ross (Barry Jenner), is the field commander of Starfleet forces during the Dominion War and the coordinator of Starfleet's defense of the Bolian and Bajoran fronts in the early stages of that war.

During the first three months of the war, Ross comes under severe pressure to halt the advance of the Dominion. He makes Captain Sisko his adjutant. As the war progresses, Ross takes a much more tactical role rather than strategically planning the war effort. After the first battle of Chin'toka, Ross is posted aboard Deep Space Nine to command the Allied forces presently hemmed in at Chin'toka. During the Battle of Cardassia, Ross leads the Starfleet wing of the assault fleet. He devises the planned assault on Cardassia and, after the war's abrupt conclusion, presides over the signing of the Treaty of Bajor.

It is later revealed that Ross was one of the few Starfleet personnel to know of the existence of Section 31. Although he collaborates with Section 31 in one of their operations, like Julian Bashir, he staunchly maintains that he is not a member of the organization.

Ross appeared in twelve episodes beginning with the season 6 episode "A Time to Stand".

In 2016, the character was ranked as the 41st most important character of Starfleet within the Star Trek science fiction universe by Wired.

=== Shakaar Edon ===
Shakaar Edon (Duncan Regehr) was a resistance leader during the Occupation and later becomes First Minister of Bajor.

As the head of Kira's resistance cell, he lets her go on her first raid at age 13 to fill in a vacancy in the ranks.

After the Cardassians are defeated, Shakaar handily wins the position of Bajor's second post-occupation First Minister, defeating acting Minister Winn in an election. As he works with Kira in her role of senior Bajoran on DS9, Shakaar realizes he has fallen in love with her and they begin a relationship. He pushes to fast-track Bajor's admission to the UFP, but that act is postponed at the last minute when Sisko receives a warning from the Prophets that it is not the right time.

He and Kira part ways romantically, after a visit to the Kendra shrine on Bajor reveals that they are not meant to walk the same path.

=== Joseph Sisko ===
Joseph Sisko (Brock Peters) is Benjamin Sisko's father.

Joseph runs a restaurant in New Orleans called "Sisko's Creole Kitchen" ("Image in the Sand").

Joseph was first married to a woman named Sarah, but when their son Benjamin was a year and a half old, Sarah left without explanation, eventually dying in a shuttle accident. Joseph remarried, but having been greatly emotionally wounded by Sarah's inexplicable leaving, could not bring himself to disclose to Benjamin who his real mother was. Years later, Benjamin discovers in the episodes "Image in the Sand" and "Shadows and Symbols" that Sarah's body was taken over by a Prophet in order to arrange his birth so he could become the Emissary.

=== Luther Sloan ===
Luther Sloan (William Sadler) is an operative of the intelligence agency Section 31. Sloan appeared in three episodes of Star Trek: Deep Space Nine: "Inquisition", "Inter Arma Enim Silent Leges", and "Extreme Measures".

Sloan keeps trying to recruit Julian Bashir for Section 31, but Bashir adamantly refuses due to the organization's harsh and illegal methods. Nevertheless, Sloan manages to drag Bashir into Section 31 operations. Bashir discovers evidence that Section 31 is responsible for infecting Odo with a genocidal virus intended to kill all the Founders and end the Dominion War. Bashir, with the help of his friend Miles O'Brien, captures Sloan and extracts the cure from his mind before Sloan is able to commit suicide.

=== Solbor ===
Solbor (James Otis) is a Bajoran assistant to Kai Winn. He is killed by Kai Winn when he threatens to expose Dukat and the Kai's betrayal of the Prophets. He appeared in three episodes.

=== Enabran Tain ===
Enabran Tain (Paul Dooley) is a Cardassian, the former head of the Obsidian Order and the father of Garak. He never admits this fact publicly, believing that his son is a "weakness [he] couldn't afford".

Tain led the Obsidian Order for twenty years, and was the only leader to live long enough to retire. Garak was his protege. Nevertheless, Tain was directly responsible for exiling Garak after being betrayed by him in some unstated way.

Tain attempts a comeback by destroying the Founders' homeworld with a combined fleet of Obsidian Order and Romulan Tal Shiar ships. However, his organization is infiltrated by a Changeling, and the fleet is destroyed in an ambush by the Jem'Hadar. Tain is captured, but manages to send a subspace signal to Garak. By the time Garak reaches him, he is dying of a heart condition. On his deathbed, Tain finally acknowledges that Garak is his son.

=== Tora Ziyal ===
Tora Ziyal is the half Cardassian / half Bajoran daughter of Dukat and his mistress Tora Naprem. She was played by Cyia Batten in "Indiscretion" and "Return to Grace", by Tracy Middendorf in the episode "For the Cause", and by Melanie Smith, over six episodes from season 5's "In Purgatory's Shadow" to season 6's "Sacrifice of Angels". Dukat and Kira Nerys find Ziyal in a Breen prison camp on the planet and free her. Dukat originally intends to kill Ziyal to protect his career, as the Cardassians consider her an abomination, but Kira's arguments and his own paternal love convince him not to.

After Cardassian/Dominion troops reclaim DS9 from the Federation, she agrees to help Quark liberate Rom, Kira, Jake and Leeta from prison. In "Sacrifice of Angels", her father tries to convince her to flee the station and return to Cardassia with him before the Federation troops retake the station. She is killed by Dukat's first officer, Damar, after he overhears her confession to her father about having helped free the prisoners. Dukat has a mental breakdown after witnessing his daughter's death.

=== Lwaxana Troi ===
A Betazoid ambassador and the mother of Deanna Troi, Lwaxana Troi (Majel Barrett) occasionally visits DS9 and causes consternation for Security Chief Odo with her romantic interest in him.

In 2015, Syfy rated Lwaxana as among the top 21 most interesting supporting characters in Star Trek.

=== Weyoun ===
Weyoun (Jeffrey Combs) is a Vorta, debuting in "To the Death". He is killed, but the writers found his character interesting and made him a clone, so that he could return. More Weyouns appeared in the series up until the finale, when the eighth and last clone is killed by Garak. All but one are completely loyal to the Founders. The exception, Weyoun 6, contacts Odo and offers to defect ("Treachery, Faith, and the Great River"); when caught escaping, he commits suicide to save Odo.

In 2013, Slate ranked Weyoun one of the ten best villains in the Star Trek franchise.

In 2015, SyFy rated Weyoun as among the top 21 most interesting supporting characters in Star Trek.

Weyoun also appears in the Star Trek novel Millennium: Fall of Terok Nor/War of the Prophets/Inferno which was written by Judith Reeves-Stevens and Garfield Reeves-Stevens.

=== Winn Adami ===
Louise Fletcher in season 3's "Life Support"

Kai Winn Adami (Louise Fletcher) is the Kai, the religious leader of Bajor. She was a vedek during the Cardassian occupation of Bajor.

Winn makes her first appearance objecting to what Keiko O'Brien teaches in her school, in the episode "In the Hands of the Prophets". Winn also directs one of her supporters to try to assassinate Bareil, Winn's chief rival.

Winn later aligns herself with an extremist group called The Circle. The Circle's goal is to eliminate all external influences from Bajor, including the Federation, which would have gotten rid of Commander Sisko, whom she resents as the Emissary of the Prophets. Her reward would have been becoming Kai. When it is discovered that The Circle is secretly being supplied by the Cardassians, Winn immediately changes sides.

In the episode "The Collaborator", the election for the next Kai approaches. Winn obtains information about the Kendra Valley Massacre, perpetrated by the Cardassians during the occupation, which she uses to manipulate Major Kira into investigating Vedek Bareil, who is in a relationship with Kira at the time. Bareil withdraws from the election in order to protect the reputation of the former Kai, Opaka—she had been responsible for the massacre in order to save over 1,400 Bajorans—which makes Winn the Kai.

In the final days of the Dominion War, Winn finally receives what she believes to be a vision from the Prophets, who tell her that a guide will soon appear to her. In reality, this vision is from the Pah-wraiths—the enemies of the Prophets—and the "guide" turns out to be Dukat, surgically altered to look like a Bajoran. Dukat convinces her to renounce her faith and release the Pah-wraiths, whom he claims are the true prophets of Bajor. When her aide Solbor discovers what she and Dukat are planning, he reveals Dukat's true identity to Winn and threatens to expose them. Winn kills him. In the series finale "What You Leave Behind", after the liberation of Cardassia, Sisko travels to the Fire Caves on Bajor, where the Pah-wraiths are imprisoned, to confront Winn and Dukat. Winn tries to kill Dukat as a necessary sacrifice to release the Pah-wraiths, but they protect him and give him great powers. Dukat and Sisko fight. Before Dukat kills her, she gives Sisko the information he needs to imprison the Pah-wraiths (and Dukat) forever.

In 2018, CBR ranked Winn the 11th-best recurring character in all of Star Trek.

In 2013, Slate ranked Kai Winn one of the ten best villains in the Star Trek franchise.

=== Kasidy Yates ===
Kasidy Danielle Yates (Penny Johnson Jerald) is a human civilian freighter captain. She is introduced to Benjamin Sisko by his son Jake, who feels it is time for Sisko to start dating again, after the death of his first wife Jennifer at the Battle of Wolf 359. The character is first introduced in the episode "Family Business" in season three, and is a recurring character (15 episodes) thereafter.

Jake's attempt at matchmaking is successful, and Kasidy and Sisko become lovers, even after her arrest and eventual imprisonment for aiding the Maquis in "For the Cause". Following her release from prison, the two resume their relationship in "Rapture". Eventually, Kasidy becomes Sisko's second wife and, at the end of the series, she becomes pregnant with their child. When Sisko leaves to join the Prophets, he tells her that he will be away for a while, but would eventually return to her. They were ranked the eighth best romantic couple in Star Trek in 2020 by Screen Rant.

=== Zek ===
Zek (Wallace Shawn) is the Grand Nagus (leader) of the Ferengi Alliance throughout most of the 24th century.

Zek pretends to retire shortly after the discovery of the wormhole near Bajor. He arrives on DS9 and names Quark as his successor, and then appears to die. However, it is all just a test to see if his son Krax is ready to take over, but Krax fails, so Zek resumes his rule.

Zek visits the Bajoran Prophets within the wormhole in an attempt to gather information. Instead, the Prophets 'devolve' Zek's personality to that of a proto-Ferengi, before his people had dedicated their lives to the acquisition of wealth. During his time in this state, Zek makes many radical reforms to his people's laws and government that direct his people away from their greedy ways, including overhauling the Rules of Acquisition. He is eventually changed back and his reforms nullified in the episode "Prophet Motive".

During a Tongo tournament on Ferenginar, Zek receives a tip from Ishka, the mother of Quark and Rom, which helps him make a comeback and win the tournament. They eventually fall in love. They are briefly broken up by Quark at the prodding of Liquidator Brunt, who wants to succeed Zek as Nagus, but the plot fails in "Ferengi Love Songs". Zek, suffering from failing memory, bequeaths all his financial dealings to the financially brilliant Ishka, eventually caving in to her demands for female rights. He is once again deposed, this time by Brunt, but is reinstated after the populace learns of the new and exciting business opportunities such reforms would bring about. Under Ishka's influence, he further reforms the Ferengi political and economic system into a significantly less capitalist model. Eventually, he retires with Ishka to Risa, naming Rom as his successor.

Shawn described the makeup process as "a little bit disturbing and uncomfortable and exhausting". It took three hours to put on the makeup, and an hour to take it off, and he would be wearing it for at least twelve hours. Although the process was arduous, and he would not have wanted to do it more than once a year, he appreciated the results and found that "To be in that world and to be in that makeup really liberated me in a way that I never experienced before — or since. I felt completely free, so it was a joyful experience."

In 2018, CBR ranked Zek the 14th best recurring character of all Star Trek.

== See also ==
- List of Star Trek characters
