= Keiko O'Brien =

Television character played by Rosalind Chao from Star Trek

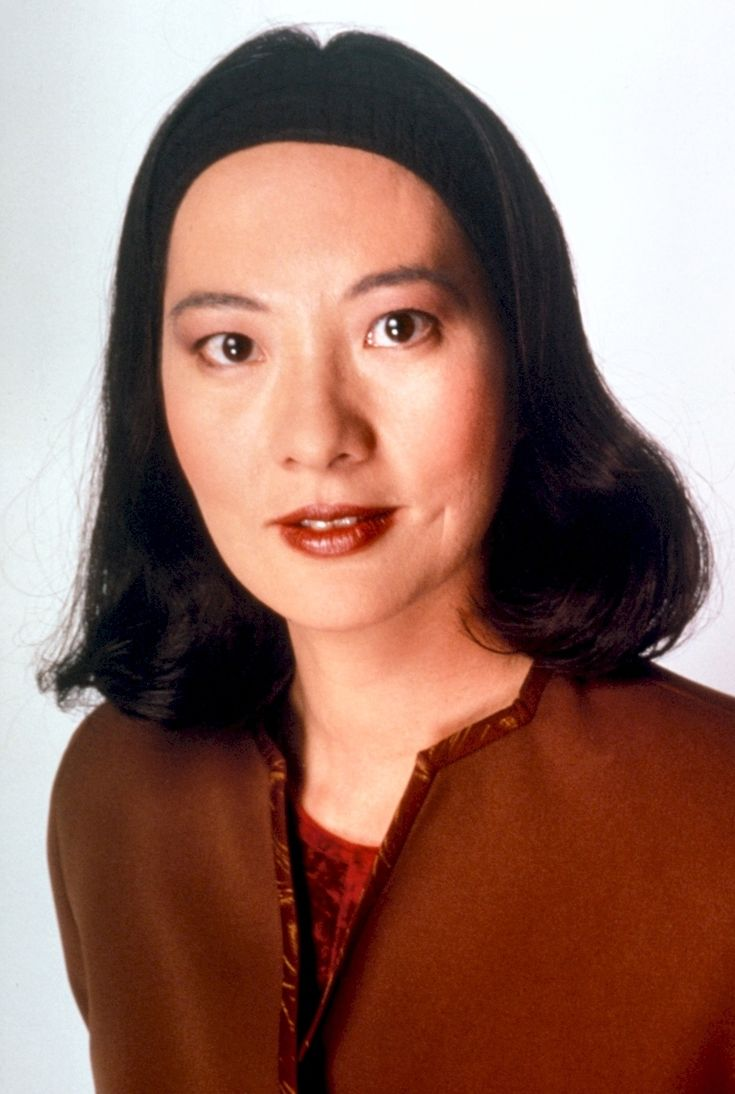
- First appearance: "Data's Day" (1991) (The Next Generation)
- Last appearance: "What You Leave Behind" (1999) (Deep Space Nine)
- Portrayed by: Rosalind Chao; Caroline Junko King (young, "Rascals")

In-universe information
- Species: Human
- Gender: Female
- Position: Botanist; School teacher (DS9)
- Affiliation: United Federation of Planets; Starfleet
- Family: Hiro Ishikawa (father)
- Spouse: Miles O'Brien
- Children: Molly O'Brien; Kirayoshi O'Brien

Keiko O'Brien (née Ishikawa) is a character in the fictional Star Trek universe, played by actress Rosalind Chao. Introduced in 1991, she is the civilian spouse of Starfleet crew member Miles O'Brien (played by Colm Meaney) appearing occasionally in later seasons of the series Star Trek: The Next Generation (1987–1994), and more frequently as a supporting character throughout Star Trek: Deep Space Nine (1993–1999), as well as in related media such as novels. The producers wanted her as a regular character on Deep Space Nine, but Chao was only available part-time.

Keiko was introduced as a romantic interest for the recurring Next Generation character of Chief O'Brien, and stories involving her and the couple's children allowed Star Trek to expand its narrative beyond weekly space missions. She is a professional botanist, and becomes a teacher on Deep Space Nine, where her husband has been stationed. She is of Japanese ancestry, which is reflected in Keiko's and Miles' Japanese-Irish marriage ceremony, and by her observance of other family traditions.

== Casting and appearances ==
Keiko is played by Chinese-American actress Rosalind Chao, who had first come to public attention playing Soon-Lee, the Korean wife of Max Klinger, in the final episode of M*A*S*H and in its spin-off AfterMASH. Actress Patti Yasutake – who would later play nurse Alyssa Ogawa on The Next Generation – auditioned unsuccessfully for the role.

Chao also auditioned for the role of Tasha Yar, the Enterprise security chief from season 1.

=== The Next Generation ===
The character was introduced in the fourth season episode of The Next Generation, "Data's Day", which depicts her imminent wedding to Miles – which she temporarily cancels – as one of several subplots in which the main-cast character Data is involved. The words in their wedding were based on Captain Kirk's in the original series 1966 episode "Balance of Terror", according to writer Ronald D. Moore.

The character appeared prominently the following season in the episode "Disaster", in which she gives birth to Keiko and Miles' first child Molly in the crew lounge Ten-Forward during a shipwide crisis. Keiko is a central character in the sixth season episode "Rascals", in which she is temporarily transformed into a child and played by Caroline Junko King.

=== Deep Space Nine ===
Chao was offered a full-time role on Deep Space Nine, which she turned down because the demands on her would be too strenuous. Keiko instead appears irregularly, with a focus on the impact of Miles’s job on the O'Briens' relationship. Finding limited opportunity to use her botanical expertise, and concerned about the educational opportunities on the station for her daughter and others' children, she starts a school, where Jake Sisko and Nog are also students.

The first season episode "In the Hands of the Prophets" shows Keiko in conflict with religious leader Vedek Winn over her teaching of science and a secular perspective on elements of Winn's Bajoran faith. In the fourth season episode "Body Parts", Keiko and her unborn child are injured, and to save the fetus it is placed into Major Kira's uterus to carry to term, as an in-story explanation for actress Nana Visitor's pregnancy. The couple and Kira form an awkward ad hoc family for the duration of the pregnancy, until their son Kirayoshi is born, in the fifth season episode "The Begotten". Meanwhile, Keiko has a central role in the fifth season episode "The Assignment", when she is possessed by a malevolent entity. During the Dominion War late in the series, Keiko and the children are evacuated from the war zone. After the war, Keiko and her family relocate to Earth, where Miles will be an instructor at Starfleet Academy.

=== Novels ===
Keiko has appeared in over twenty Star Trek novels. Examples include The Fall: Revelation and Dust, Warpath, Warped, and The Tempest.

=== Toys ===
Keiko was also released as a toy figurine, Playmates no. 65121.

== Reception ==
Viewers and critics had mixed reactions to the character. Some criticized her as unlikable and "shrewish", based on her abrupt (and short-lived) cancellation of her wedding to Miles, and her domestic expectations of him in Deep Space Nine episodes. Appearing in only eight episodes of The Next Generation, and 19 episodes of Deep Space Nine, she did not get as much character development as the primary characters, with an article on The Mary Sue complaining that her traits are largely a series of "cultural stereotypes, likely checked off by a writer’s room of non-Asian writers who really just weren’t sure how to write a fully fleshed-out Asian character." IndieWire ranked Keiko as only the 14th best out of 17 regular and recurring characters on The Next Generation. A Screen Rant article argued, "It's a struggle to come up with any compelling reasons why Keiko needed to exist", and that the character overall "hurt" The Next Generation.

However, To Boldly Go: Essays on Gender and Identity in the Star Trek Universe argues that Keiko and Miles have the only successful long-term relationship in the entire Star Trek universe, noting that they are married in the fourth season of The Next Generation, have two children, and are still committed to each other at the conclusion of Deep Space Nine after nearly a decade. CBR praised the character and her relationship with Miles as a realistic depiction of the strains that marriage can involve, and ranked Keiko the 7th best recurring character in all of Star Trek. SyFy described her as "fascinating", rating her among the 21 most interesting supporting characters of the franchise.

In 2020, ScreenRant suggested that Keiko and Miles would make a good spin-off series.
