= Bajoran =

Fictional extraterrestrial species from Star Trek

Bajorans
- Star Trek race
- Ro Laren (portrayed by Michelle Forbes), a recurring Bajoran character in Star Trek: The Next Generation
- First appearance: "Ensign Ro"; Star Trek: The Next Generation; 1991
- Created by: Rick Berman; Michael Piller

In-universe information
- Quadrant: Alpha
- Home world: Bajor
- Base of operations: Deep Space Nine
- Language: Bajoran, Ancient Bajoran
- Currency: lita
- Official religion: Bajoran religion
- Affiliation: United Federation of Planets, Bajoran Provisional Government
- Leader: First Minister (political leader); Kai (spiritual leader)

The Bajorans (variously pronounced /bəˈdʒɔːrənz/ bə-JOR-ənz, /bæˈdʒɔːrənz/ baj-OR-ənz, /bəˈʒɔːrənz/ bə-ZHOR-ənz) are a fictional species in the science-fiction Star Trek franchise. They are a humanoid extraterrestrial species native to the planet Bajor, who have a long-standing enmity with the Cardassians, owing to decades of subjugation under a military dictatorship which saw many of their species enslaved or forced into exile away from their homeworld. They were first introduced in the 1991 episode "Ensign Ro" of Star Trek: The Next Generation, and subsequently were a pivotal element of Star Trek: Deep Space Nine and also appeared in Star Trek: Voyager and Star Trek: Picard.

The shows' writers initially depicted the Bajorans as an oppressed people who were often forced to live as refugees, whom they likened to a variety of ethnic groups. Rick Berman, who helped to originally conceive them, compared them to "The Kurds, the Palestinians, the Jews in the 1940s, the boat people from Haiti—unfortunately, the homeless and terrorism are problems in every age." Ronald D. Moore similarly commented, "depending on the episode, you could also call Bajor Israel, or Iran, or even America and the Cardassians could be Germans, or Russians or several other examples ... [but] we don't really try to make Bajor a direct analogy to any specific contemporary country or people."

Various Bajoran characters were included in several of the Star Trek series, including Ro Laren (played by Michelle Forbes) in The Next Generation as well as a number of others in Deep Space Nine, which was set on a space station near to Bajor, and which featured Bajoran characters such as Kira Nerys (Nana Visitor) and Winn Adami (Louise Fletcher).

== Storyline ==
According to the fictional storyline of the Star Trek universe, the Bajorans are an ancient species who developed advanced technology before the evolution of humanity on Earth. They eventually developed space-faring ships, which took them as far away as the planet of Cardassia. In 2318 the Cardassian Union, which had been taken over by a military dictatorship, invaded Bajor, occupying it for fifty years, during which time they forced many Bajorans into slave labor, using them in their various mining operations. This forced many Bajorans to flee and live in refugee camps away from Cardassian domination, while other Bajorans became involved in the resistance movement, organising terrorist attacks against Cardassian targets.

The Federation could not intervene in the situation, due to Prime Directive considerations; since Bajor had formally aligned itself with the Cardassians some time before, it was considered an internal matter between the Cardassian Union and a member/subject planet. This caused some resentment towards the Federation by the Bajoran people, especially when the Federation was initially invited to administer Deep Space Nine. This latent anger led to the formation of the Circle, an anti-Non-Bajorian movement which almost succeeded in capturing Deep Space Nine-until the "Circle" was exposed as being secretly supported by the Cardassians so that a Bajor without Federation Support would be severely weakened.

In 2369, the Cardassian civilian authorities ordered the military to withdraw from Bajor, after which the Bajoran Provisional Government invited the United Federation of Planets to set up base on the former Cardassian mining station of Terok Nor, renaming it Deep Space Nine, and requesting membership into the Federation.

In 2369, when Commander (later Captain) Benjamin Sisko was assigned command of DS9, one of his instructions was to prepare Bajor for full membership into the Federation (pilot episode: "Emissary"). This was a long-running theme during the rest of the series. In 2373, with the Dominion War on the horizon, Bajor asks to be admitted to the Federation under special circumstances. Sisko, acting as Emissary of the Prophets, warned that if Bajor were to join the Federation at that time, it would mean the destruction of that world. With this warning, Bajor decided not to accept membership at that time. At the start of the Dominion War, Bajor officially declared their neutrality ("Call to Arms"), although many Bajorans joined Starfleet and, as well, a new resistance to the (renewed) occupation of Deep Space Nine was formed.

== Biology ==
Like many aliens on Star Trek, the Bajorans are human-like in appearance, but have a distinctive symmetrical facial feature: a series of horizontal ridges on the bridge of the nose between the eyes. Despite their human-like appearance, there are several biological differences between the two species.

During pregnancy, Bajoran women experience uncontrollable sneezing fits in lieu of morning sickness. Bajoran women gestate for five months, as opposed to the nine months of human women, due to high vascularization between the fetus and the mother. As a result, any attempt to remove the fetus prematurely, especially during the later stages of pregnancy, would cause massive blood loss to the mother and severe distress to the baby ("Body Parts"). During childbirth, Bajoran women must be completely relaxed. Their body produces endorphins during labor, and thus they commonly feel little or no pain during the process. Typically, labor only lasts an hour, but if it goes on too long, the body stops producing endorphins lest they rise to toxic levels, and the baby will have to be born at a later time ("The Begotten").

== Culture and traditions ==
Bajoran tradition places the family name before the given name. Thus, Kira Nerys is called Major Kira (not Major Nerys); likewise, Ro Laren (Ensign Ro). Bajorans typically consider it an honor when they are addressed correctly by offworlders.

Bajorans' spiritual lives center around the Orbs—alien objects believed to have been sent by the Prophets (the gods)—each of which has a unique ability such as the Orb of Time, which allows those viewing it to revisit past events. Nine orbs have been discovered over the centuries (plus the Orb of the Emissary, during the final season episode "Shadows and Symbols"); eight were seized by the Cardassians during the Occupation. In the series there are ten orbs although only five are named: the Orb of Prophecy and Change, which was kept on Bajor; the Orbs of Contemplation and of Time, which the Cardassians returned to Bajor; the Orb of Wisdom, which the Ferengi sold to Bajor; and the Orb of the Emissary, which Sisko found. A non-canonical novel names the other five Orbs as the Orbs of Memory, Destiny, Souls, Truth, and Unity.

The Bajoran people were originally divided into castes, called d'jarras, that dictated a person's place in Bajoran society; members of a lower-ranking d'jarra were expected to defer to those of a higher caste. When the Occupation began, the d'jarra system was abolished as the resistance movement encouraged all Bajorans to unite, regardless of caste. When the former Bajoran spiritual leader, Akorem Laan, attempted to reintroduce the caste system, it was rejected because it would have made Bajor ineligible for Federation membership (caste-based discrimination is forbidden under Federation law).

Bajorans wear large, chained earrings and ear cuffs called d'ja pagh on their right ears, as symbols of their religious faith. Before the war against Cardassian occupation, the earring also symbolized one's d'jarra. Even after the Occupation, there were still different styles of earrings passed down through families, but they had lost their original significance. When Akorem Laan encountered Major Kira, he recognized from the style of her earring that she is a member of the artisan d'jarra, even though she was a member of the military, and she explained that the different styles of earring no longer signified anything. Ro Laren lost her faith because of her experiences while a Cardassian Prisoner; yet, still defiantly Bajoran, she wears her d'ja pagh on her left ear. It's later discovered that Ro also used her earring as a covert data storage device which she gave to Jean-Luc Picard shortly before her death.

Bajoran cuisine is not unlike that of many other races. Many Bajorans are fond of hasperat, which is almost identical in taste and texture to that of a large (and often spicy) Earth burrito prepared in a special brine. Jumja sticks are large, dark red, roughly diamond-shaped popsicle-like sweet confectionery treats, though some other races, like Romulans, have commented that they can be a little too sweet. In addition to various ales, Bajorans have been known to make an alcoholic beverage known as spring wine, which very much like other wines, has vintage years, and the quality of the wine can vary from year to year, and bottles from a particularly good vintage year can become sought-after collector's items among high-ranking Bajorans. Also, humans serving aboard Deep Space Nine would frequently order Terran seafood dishes with Bajoran Shrimp as a substitute, since replication issues aside, transporting shrimp from Earth would be impractical, given the travel time involved.

== Bajor ==
Bajor

In-universe information
- Type: Class M planet
- Locations: Alpha Quadrant, near the Badlands, Cardassia Prime and the Demilitarized Zone
- Characters: Independent, Cardassian vassal, Cardassian Union, independent, Federation Autonomous State

Bajor (/ˈbeɪdʒɔːr/ BAY-jor or /ˈbeɪʒɔːr/ BAY-zhor) is the homeworld of the Bajorans. Bajor is a Class M planet with five moons. A day on Bajor lasts 26 hours, and Deep Space Nine also follows a 26-hour day. Bajor's oceans viewed from space appear more green than blue.

Bajor, the seventh planet in the system, orbits the star Bajor-B'hava'el in the Bajoran sector. Other inhabited celestial bodies in the Bajoran star system include Andros (Bajor VIII), a Class K planet (similar to Mars) and the fifth moon of Bajor, Jeraddo.

== Religion ==
The Bajoran religion, also called The Way of the Prophets, is a major unifying force on the planet. This religion is unusual in that the deities and other phenomena associated with the religion, though treated as supernatural, can also be understood as beings in the material world accessible by scientific observations.

=== Prophets ===
The Prophets, or "the wormhole aliens" (as they are referred to by most non-Bajorans) exist within the wormhole connecting the Alpha and Gamma Quadrants, the Alpha Quadrant end being located within the Bajoran system. This wormhole is referred to as the Celestial Temple by the Bajoran people. The Prophets experience time differently, with their first (known) encounter with corporeal beings (Benjamin Sisko) resulting in a long and confusing conversation as to how linear time works. Their motives remain unclear; on several occasions they proclaim their disinterest in the physical world, though they do repeatedly intervene on behalf of Bajor and its people.

The Prophets are the creators of sacred objects called Orbs or "Tears of the Prophets". The orbs induce visions ("Orb Experiences") in people.

=== Pagh ===
Another aspect of the religion is that of the Pagh (immortal soul). If a person has followed the will of the Prophets, their Pagh is "clean" and they will be permitted to enter the Celestial Temple and dwell with the Prophets. Bajoran spiritual leaders such as Kais and Vedeks can feel the Pagh of another by pinching the lobe of one's ear, though many find this scrutiny to be slightly unsettling.

One's Pagh can also be stolen by the Pagh Wraiths, members of the race of "wormhole aliens" who have been expelled from the wormhole. The Wraiths, also known as Kosst Amojan (Bajoran for "to be expelled"), work against the Prophets, trying to enforce their own claim that they are the true gods of Bajor.

=== Practices ===
Religious practices are unclear. The Bajoran religion involves regular services which are intended to teach the "Will of the Prophets". Meditation and prayer (either in groups or privately) are commonly used, but not strictly observed. There are some orthodox groups within the religion who take a rather dim view of science (more specifically a scientific interpretation of the wormhole) and the beliefs of other species, but this is a small minority, with relatively little support among the people. In the Next Generation episode "The Next Phase", Ro Laren mentions that some traditional Bajoran funeral rites can go on for over three hours. Bajoran women cry out their grief at Funerals—similar to Irish keening.

Prior to the events of Deep Space Nine, Bajoran society was socially stratified; by religious edict, a person's place in society was determined by their caste (or d'jara) (Kira Nerys would have been an artist if not for the Cardassian occupation). When the Cardassian Empire occupied Bajor, the d'jara system was abandoned so all Bajoran citizens could become soldiers and fight in the Resistance. When Akorem Laan attempted to reinstate the d'jara system in 2372, Bajor's application for Federation membership was put in jeopardy, as caste-based discrimination was specifically forbidden by the Federation Charter.

The non-canon Deep Space Nine Relaunch novels reveal the existence of a form of excommunication from the Bajoran faith: when Kira Nerys interferes in a growing civil war, despite being ordered not to do so by the Vedek Assembly, she is declared "attainted" and can no longer attend Bajoran services, set foot in a temple, or study from an Orb or the Bajoran sacred texts.

=== Hierarchy ===
The hierarchy of the Bajoran faith has never been explained in great detail, though a certain amount is known:

Titles in the Bajoran religion include a "Prylar" (roughly equivalent to a Christian monk), "Ranjen" (a rank falling between Prylars and the next rank, and responsible for a variety of tasks), "Mylar" (priest or minister, mentioned in "Ties of Blood and Water"), "Vedek" (cardinal, bishop) and "Kai" (equivalent to the pope in Catholic theology or Patriarch in the Eastern Orthodox theology). All these ranks are open both to men and to women, and clerics are free to marry and have children.

Vedeks, the second highest level, also make up the Vedek Assembly, the committee which is responsible for the spiritual issues of the Bajoran people. A new Kai is elected by the Vedek Assembly (loosely analogous to how the College of Cardinals elects a new pope) from among those in the Assembly.

The Kai is the spiritual leader. She or he has a great deal of influence on the Bajoran government despite having no official power. After Kai Opaka departed in 2369, the election of a new Kai from the members of the Vedek Assembly led to the election of Kai Winn, who remained Kai until her demise in 2375.

The central figure in the Bajoran faith is known as "the Emissary", a being believed to be sent by the Prophets to aid Bajor. Benjamin Sisko, a human Starfleet officer, filled this role when he made first contact with the beings believed by the Bajorans to be the Prophets, and the enigmatic beings spoke to him on several other occasions, either to deliver a message or fulfill a task. Although his role was never entirely clear (and Sisko himself was visibly uncomfortable with it for the first few years), the Bajorans respected and admired Sisko as their Emissary, and he carried Bajor through several hardships. In this respect, the Emissary nominally holds even more religious and secular power than the Kai or the First Minister. For example, even the politically ambitious Kai Winn sought religious guidance from the Emissary, and Akorem Laan was able to single-handedly reinstate the observance of the obsolete D'Jarra caste system in 2372 when he briefly claimed the title of Emissary.

=== Pagh Wraiths ===
The Pagh Wraiths (also spelled Pah Wraiths), Bajoran for Soul Wraiths, are the enemies of the Bajoran Prophets. Bajoran religious texts state that the Pagh Wraiths once resided in the Celestial Temple (the Bajoran wormhole) alongside the Prophets and, like them, are non-corporeal beings. However, they were expelled from the Celestial Temple and banished to the Fire Caves on Bajor. According to ancient Bajoran texts, the Pagh Wraiths were "false Prophets". Whereas the Prophets are analogous to angels or even gods, the Pagh Wraiths are analogous to demons.

Similarly to Christianity's Satan, Kosst Amojan ("The Evil One") was a Prophet who was forced out of the Celestial Temple after a failed attempt to seize control, with the other Pagh Wraiths, which are similar to fallen angels in Christianity. In several other incidents, the Pagh Wraiths attempted to leave their physical prison (the "Caves of Fire") and return to take control of the Celestial Temple, but none of these attempts succeeded. There continues to be a minority group on Bajor who worship the Pagh Wraiths as the True Prophets, but they are generally shunned as outcasts and heretics. Despite this, the cult of the Pagh Wraiths became more popular on Bajor as an alternative religion to that of the Prophets, after many Bajorans felt the Prophets had abandoned them due to the closure of the wormhole. For a time, Dukat even formed his own Pagh Wraith cult on the abandoned space station Empok Nor, with himself as leader.

Like the Prophets, they are able to induce visions in corporeal beings, appearing as familiar figures as the Prophets do in such visions. The Pagh Wraiths long for revenge against the Prophets who cast them out of the Celestial Temple (the wormhole), even going so far as to possess the bodies of corporeal beings to further their goals:

Keiko O'Brien, wife of Deep Space Nine's Chief of Operations Miles O'Brien, was briefly possessed by a Pagh Wraith in a nearly successful attempt to destroy the Prophets (episode: "The Assignment"); Miles instead directed the energy charge at Keiko, which destroyed the evil spirit and freed his wife.

In the episode "The Reckoning", the Emissary (Benjamin Sisko) released a Pagh Wraith and a Prophet from an ancient artifact. These beings fought on the Gates to the Celestial Temple (the space station Deep Space Nine). In the fight, a Prophet possessed the (willing) body of Kira Nerys while the Pagh Wraith possessed the (unwilling) body of Jake Sisko.

In "Tears of the Prophets"; Gul Dukat unleashed a Pagh Wraith from an ancient relic that possessed his body. While possessed, Dukat proceeded to kill Jadzia Dax and use the Orb of Contemplation on Deep Space Nine to enable the Pagh Wraith to re-enter the wormhole and seal the entrance. However, when Sisko found the Orb of the Emissary some months later (in "Shadows and Symbols"), the wormhole reopened, and the Pagh Wraith was again cast out.

In the series finale, "What You Leave Behind", Dukat and Winn Adami attempt to free the Pagh Wraiths from their prison by deciphering an ancient text written in the Book of the Kosst Amojan which acts as a key. Winn, who had briefly abandoned her faith in the Prophets after she had a vision from the Pagh Wraiths, ultimately undergoes a change of heart, but she is killed by Dukat as she tries to stop him. The wraiths are defeated when, with help from the Prophets, Sisko casts himself, Dukat and the Kosst Amojan into the Fire Caves, destroying the ancient book; Dukat is trapped forever with the Pagh Wraiths while Sisko becomes part of the Prophets.

== Politics ==
=== Provisional Government ===
The provisional government was set up after the occupation of Bajor by Cardassia ended in 2369. It consisted of a council of elected officials headed by the First Minister and was responsible for administration of the planet and to a certain extent Deep Space Nine. A three-part arc, "The Homecoming", "The Circle", and "The Siege", featured a story about the Provisional Government and its inability to resolve an explosive political revolution. In the immediate aftermath of the Cardassian withdrawal, many characters felt the provisional government would collapse within a matter of weeks, leading to civil war (which the Cardassians might use as an excuse to return to "restore order"). Sisko managed to convince Kai Opaka to declare the support of the Bajoran religious hierarchy for the new government, which prevented it from outright collapsing. In the early seasons of the TV series the provisional government is shaky and precarious, but over time by the later seasons of the TV series it grew more stable, particularly after the election of First Minister Shakaar.

=== Bajoran Militia ===
The Bajoran Militia was the military arm of the Bajoran Provisional Government, originally made up of many former resistance fighters from the Occupation of Bajor.

The structure was comparable to that of an Earth army, with similar ranks. Bajoran officers were organized by divisional specialty, wearing different uniform colors for each (similar to Starfleet). Flag officers wear a more elaborate version of the normal duty uniform.

Officers of the Militia were usually graduates of the Bajoran Military Academy, although many commissions were awarded on the basis of demonstrated skills and merit of the soldiers who were part of the resistance against the occupation.

The Militia jointly operated Deep Space Nine with Starfleet. From 2369 to 2375 the station was commanded by a Starfleet command level officer and the executive officer was a Militia member. When the station's commander, Captain Sisko, disappeared in late 2375, his executive, Colonel Kira, took command.

It was said in the Star Trek: Deep Space Nine episode "Rapture" that if Bajor joins the United Federation of Planets, most of the Bajoran Militia would be absorbed into Starfleet. In the non-canonical relaunch novel Unity, this happened in 2376.

Notable members of the Bajoran Militia included Major Kira and Odo.

=== Kai ===
The Kai /kaɪ/ is the spiritual leader of the Bajoran people.

This individual could be either male or female, could be married, and could have children. The Kai is chosen in an election held by the entire Bajoran people, though typically candidates come from the Vedek assembly of high-ranking clerics. He or she also seems to hold a fair amount of political influence on Bajor; the government is headed by a First Minister although Bajorans typically will listen to whatever the Kai says.

When Starfleet forces initially arrived at Deep Space Nine, the Kai was a woman named Opaka Sulan. She introduced Commander Sisko to an Orb or Tear of the Prophets, and was the first to refer to him openly as "the Emissary". Opaka was officially declared missing during an escorted trip through the Bajoran wormhole, when she discovered two feuding Gamma Quadrant races and elected to remain with them in hopes of negotiating a peaceful resolution to their conflict. In time, two leading candidates emerged to succeed her. One was Vedek Winn Adami—a member of a small conservative order on Bajor who harbored anti-Federation feelings.

The other was Vedek Bareil Antos, who counseled then-Vedek Winn and convinced her to adopt a more conciliatory attitude toward the Federation and Commander Sisko. Bareil was considered the most likely candidate to succeed Kai Opaka, but political maneuvering by Kai Winn forced him to resign his candidacy.

Kai Winn later tried to consolidate her hold on power after the death of the Bajoran First Minister, reneging on an agreement the previous government had made with several destitute Bajoran farmers and risking civil war in the process. Major Kira of DS9 convinced her old friend and resistance cell leader Shakaar Edon to run for election in opposition to Kai Winn to block her from obtaining total control of the Bajoran government. Kai Winn withdrew when Kira threatened to expose Winn's duplicity, and Shakaar was elected to the post of First Minister.

Later, at the beginning of the Dominion War, Captain Sisko convinced Kai Winn, as well as the Council of Ministers, to sign a non-aggression treaty with the Dominion; Sisko wanted to ensure Bajor was kept out of the fighting so everything they had accomplished in the past five years wouldn't be destroyed by the war.

With the end of the Dominion War in sight, Kai Winn was tempted to join with Dukat—who had been surgically altered to look like a Bajoran—in worshipping the Pagh Wraiths. When she discovered who the man really was, she was devastated by having fallen for the deception. When she sought Colonel Kira's advice, Kira advised Winn she could be redeemed if she stepped down from the post, but Winn refused.

Kai Winn turned away from the Prophets, and became a tool of the Pagh Wraiths. In the final moments of her life, she tried to throw the Book of the Kosst-Amojan into the pit of fire. She was then killed by Dukat. In the non-canon MMORPG Star Trek Online, set thirty years after the events of Deep Space Nine, it is implied that Kira Nerys eventually became Kai.

=== First Minister ===
The First Minister of Bajor is a role analogous to a President on Earth, and is a separate office from the religious leader, the Kai. The First Minister is the Bajoran head of government and head of state, and also serves as the head of the Chamber of Ministers, the Bajoran legislature. (A separate organization, the Vedek Assembly, serves as an advisory body to the Kai.)

Office-holders since 2370

- Jaro Essa
- Kalem Apren
- Winn Adami (acting)
- Shakaar Edon

== Federation membership ==
In the Deep Space Nine premiere episode "Emissary", Captain Jean Luc Picard informs Benjamin Sisko that one of his tasks as commander of DS9 is to develop a continuing evaluation of Bajor for potential membership in the United Federation of Planets.

In the episode "Rapture", Federation membership of Bajor is an important plot-point.

Later, in the non-canon Deep Space Nine relaunch novels, Bajor finally joins the Federation. Most of the Bajoran Militia are absorbed into Starfleet, with Colonel Kira (now commanding DS9) promoted to captain. Also, the Bajoran government (here named the Third Republic of Bajor) begins selecting a councillor to represent Bajor on the Federation Council.

In the Star Trek: Picard pilot episode, a star map shows the planet Bajor within the bounds of Federation territory, suggesting that by the year 2399 (when the episode takes place), Bajor has indeed joined the Federation.

== Bajorans ==
The first Bajoran to appear on Star Trek was Ro Laren, in the episode "Ensign Ro".

- Keeve Folor, refugee leader, Valo II (Episode: TNG "Ensign Ro"; played by Scott Marlowe)
- Kai Opaka Sulan
- Kai Winn Adami
- Vedek Bareil Antos
- First Minister Shakaar Edon
- Major (later Colonel) Kira Nerys
- Ensign (later Commander) Ro Laren
- Li Nalas
- Dr. Mora Pol
- Ensign Sito Jaxa
- Tora Ziyal (half-Bajoran, half-Cardassian)
- Leeta
- Akorem Laan, 22nd century poet
- Tahna Los
- Tal Celes
- Shaxs

== Reception ==
In 2017, Den of Geek ranked Bajorans the 5th best aliens of the Star Trek franchise.

== Analysis ==
The Bajorans as analogues to oppressed people of Earth has been widely studied, as has the portrayal of Bajorans as righteous, religious "freedom fighters".
