= Kira Nerys =

Fictional humanoid in the TV Series Star Trek Deep Space Nine

- Star Trek character
- First appearance: "Emissary" (1993) (Deep Space Nine)
- Last appearance: "Hear All, Trust Nothing" (2022) (Lower Decks)
- Portrayed by: Nana Visitor

In-universe information
- Species: Bajoran
- Affiliation: Bajoran Militia; Starfleet
- Posting: Deep Space Nine; USS Defiant
- Position: Commanding Officer (Season 7); First Officer (Seasons 1–7); Second Officer USS Defiant (Seasons 4–7)
- Rank: Colonel (Bajoran Militia) (Season 7); Commander (Starfleet) (Season 7); Major (Bajoran Militia) (Seasons 1–6)
- Partner: Bareil Antos, Shakaar Edon, Odo

Kira Nerys (/ˈkɪərə nɪˈriːs/ KEER-ə nirr-EESS) is a fictional character in the American science fiction television series Star Trek: Deep Space Nine (1993–1999). She was played by actress Nana Visitor. The character is from the fictional planet Bajor, a world which has recently emerged from a brutal foreign occupation. She was a member of the resistance, and the decades-long conflict has left her tough and uncompromising, but she is sustained by her strong faith in traditional Bajoran religion. She has been assigned to Deep Space Nine, a space station jointly operated by the United Federation of Planets and the new provisional Bajoran government, where she serves as second in command as well as the ranking representative of her people.

== Backstory ==
Per Bajoran custom, her family name, Kira, precedes her given name, Nerys. She has two brothers (Kira Reon and Kira Pohl), and her parents' names are Kira Taban (played by Thomas Kopache throughout the series) and Kira Meru (played by Leslie Hope in "Wrongs Darker than Death or Night").

The backstory of the character states that Kira Nerys was born 2343, in Dakhur province, Bajor, during the 50-year Cardassian occupation of the planet. She was raised in a labor camp. Her family were members of the artisan caste, namely sculptors of clay, or potters. At age 13, Kira was recruited into the Shakaar resistance cell, part of an underground movement which carried out guerrilla attacks against Cardassian military and civilians with the ultimate goal of ending the occupation.

== Story ==
Kira is assigned as the senior Bajoran Militia officer aboard Deep Space Nine (DS9), acting as the station's executive officer under the Starfleet Commander Benjamin Sisko, who commands the facility. Initially, Kira is opposed to the Federation presence on DS9, feeling that the Bajoran people should have nothing to do with the Federation, as she believes that Bajor needs to be able to stand on its own two feet, after enduring a long, brutal occupation by the Cardassians. Over time, her sentiments change and she becomes one of the strongest supporters of Bajor joining the Federation, and is a steadfast ally and friend of Sisko. She is deeply religious, which makes her relationship with Sisko somewhat complicated; not only is he her commanding officer, he is also the emissary of the Prophets, the Bajorans' gods.

As a member of the Bajoran Militia, Kira is an invaluable help to Starfleet in its mission on DS9. She often commands Starfleet personnel as DS9's executive officer. In the third season, she also serves as the first officer of the Defiant, a Starfleet warship based at DS9, until Lieutenant Commander Worf assumes that role in the fourth season. When the Dominion recaptures Deep Space Nine at the start of the Dominion War, at the end of the fifth season, Kira remains aboard the station as liaison officer, as a result of Bajor's non-aggression pact with the Dominion. At the beginning of the sixth season, The Federation is losing the war against the Dominion and this, alongside a Vedek's suicide which she witnesses, galvanizes Kira to start plotting a resistance movement against the Dominion. The movement is eventually successful in helping Starfleet retake the station and driving the Dominion back behind enemy lines.

Towards the end of the seventh and final season, Kira is promoted to colonel and temporarily commissioned as a Starfleet commander. She plays a significant role in helping the Cardassian Resistance wage a guerrilla war against the Dominion, being sent by Sisko to Cardassia itself to teach Damar and his followers the tactics she learned during the Cardassian occupation of Bajor. At the conclusion of the war (and the end of the series), Kira takes command of DS9 after the disappearance of Sisko. She is still in command several years later as seen in the Star Trek: Lower Decks Season 3 episode, "Hear All, Trust Nothing".

=== Personal relationships ===
Kira becomes romantically involved with Bareil Antos, a prominent Bajoran vedek (cleric). Following his death, she later becomes involved with Shakaar Edon, a former resistance leader during the Cardassian occupation, who later becomes Bajor's First Minister. After a couple of years, accepting that the relationship is going nowhere (and after a visit to the Kenda Shrine on Bajor), the couple decide to end their relationship. Kira then forms a romantic relationship with the shapeshifter Odo, who had pined after her for years, though this too ends when Odo rejoins his people in the Gamma Quadrant at the conclusion of the series.

Kira also becomes the surrogate mother to Kirayoshi O'Brien, the then-unborn child of Chief Engineer Miles O'Brien and his wife Keiko. When the pregnant Keiko was injured in a shuttle accident, Dr Julian Bashir saves the fetus by transporting it into Kira's womb. Kira continues to carry the fetus until birth.

=== Enemies ===
Kira's arch enemy is the former Cardassian head of Deep Space 9, Gul Dukat. At the beginning of the series, Kira despises Dukat for helping oversee the occupation of Bajor and takes every opportunity to antagonise him further. As the series progresses, the relationship slightly softens, particularly after Kira learns that Dukat has a half-Bajoran daughter named Ziyal whom he initially believed had been killed. Dukat's military career and status suffer when he takes Ziyal back to Cardassia Prime and he and Kira join forces to help defend both Cardassia and Deep Space 9 against a Klingon invasion.

=== Non-canonical information ===
In the licensed Star Trek novels (which are not considered canonical by Paramount), following the conclusion of the television series Star Trek: Deep Space Nine, Kira Nerys takes charge of the Deep Space Nine space station as its permanent commanding officer. With the conclusion of the first wave of Deep Space Nine novels in Unity, Bajor finally joins the Federation, and Kira is given the Starfleet rank of Captain. Kira opens every Bajoran Orb simultaneously in a sacred place in order to defeat a monstrous enemy. This also causes the return of Benjamin Sisko from the Celestial Temple to the corporeal world.

In the 2019 documentary What We Left Behind, former showrunner Ira Steven Behr and several former writers of the series participated in a "what-if" planning session for an eighth season, where Kira has resigned from Starfleet and the Bajoran Militia and is a vedek in the Bajoran religious order.

=== Mirror Universe ===
The character of Kira Nerys also exists in the Mirror Universe. In the DS9 episode "Crossover", Kira encounters her mirror self, who is the cruel, powerful Intendant of the station (still called Terok Nor), with Elim Garak as her first officer. Kira convinces the mirror-Sisko to rebel against the Intendant-Kira and start the Terran Resistance. This group is later successful in taking command of Terok Nor and capturing the Intendant, but she manages to escape with the help of mirror-Nog. Eventually, the escaped Intendant convinces the alternate universe's Bareil Antos to travel to the regular universe in order to obtain an Orb of the Prophets. The mirror Kira falls in love with her double from the other universe. At the time, Nana Visitor dismissed the idea of her character being bisexual, saying that she intended to portray this as "total narcissism on her part. It had nothing to do with sexuality". However, later episodes continued to show her surrounded by a mixed-gender harem, and eventually depicted her being in a relationship with her universe's version of Ezri Tigan.

== Casting ==
In the early stages of planning Deep Space Nine, the series' creators wanted to bring in the Bajoran character Ensign Ro Laren, who was a recurring character in Star Trek: The Next Generation. Michelle Forbes, who had portrayed Ensign Ro, turned down the offer, so a new Bajoran character was created instead. Nana Visitor had just given birth to a baby boy mere months before she was called to audition for the role of Kira Nerys, and her becoming a mother actually shaped her decision process for accepting or turning down roles. With the character of Kira Nerys, Visitor felt "completely engaged on every level by the part".

Visitor almost turned down the role, as her manager told her "you will kill your career if you do this job." Visitor said, "By the end of the call, he had convinced me that I did want to be a part of it whether it impacted the rest of my career or not. When I read the script, I thought, 'That's a man's role. That's not for me.' Yet it was all I wanted to do. I hated every part that I had to play where I was chastising a husband or getting upset about the carpet. And I did a lot of those. Any time I could get my teeth into something, that was my flow state. That's why I was an actor. Major Kira was like Disneyland for an actor."

== Reception ==
An article in the Journal of the American Academy of Psychoanalysis finds the character of Kira "emotionally difficult". In Star Trek and Sacred Ground: Explorations of Star Trek, Religion, and American Culture, noted that Kira was not shown worshipping privately until the 1997 episode "Ties of Blood and Water".

On the 25th anniversary of DS9 in 2018, Daniel Holloway and Joe Otterson discussed the character at length saying, "Fan reception to the character, and to the show as a whole, ran hot and cold. Previous female "Star Trek" characters had been helpmates—a switchboard operator (Lt. Uhura in the original series), a therapist (Counselor Troi in Next Generation), a healer (Dr. Crusher in The Next Generation). None had been a war veteran with emotional skeletons. Visitor said, "Some people in the 'Star Trek' world were like, 'That's not what a woman in "Star Trek" should be. That's the wrong thing to be teaching. But what I saw her as was a woman of appetite and gray area—lots of gray area. Very fallible, but growing and trying. And that's all over television now." Holloway and Otterson suggested the character was a precursor to Michael Burnham on Star Trek: Discovery.

In 2016, ScreenRant rated Kira Nerys as the fifth-best character in Star Trek overall. In 2018, TheWrap rated Kira as the tenth-best character of Star Trek overall, noting her role in Star Trek: Deep Space Nine. The Hollywood Reporter noted the character's role in the season one episode "Duet" which they ranked as the 7th-best episode of the series; Nana Visitor, who played Kira, praised the episode's writing.

In 2009, IGN ranked Kira as the 11th-best character of Star Trek overall. In 2018, CBR ranked Kira as the 11th-best Starfleet character of Star Trek. They elaborate that Kira in the show is not actually part of Starfleet until the last episode, in that brief time she has a big impact on the Dominion war. In 2018, TheWrap placed Kira as 10th out 39 in a ranking of main cast characters of the Star Trek franchise prior to Star Trek: Discovery.

In 2013, Slate magazine ranked Kira Nerys one of the ten best crew characters in the Star Trek franchise.

Film magazine CineAction called Kira "perhaps the best character" in Deep Space Nine's cast.

In 2016, the character of Colonel Kira was ranked as the 7th-most-important character of Starfleet within the Star Trek science fiction universe by Wired.

In 2020, ScreenRant ranked Kira one of the top 5 most likeable characters on the show.

== Bibliography ==
- Foster, Thomas A. (2014). "Working Toward a Television Canon". CineAction. No. 94. pp. 37–39. ProQuest 1615294365.
