= In Purgatory's Shadow =

- Star Trek: Deep Space Nine episode
- Episode no.: Season 5 Episode 14
- Directed by: Gabrielle Beaumont
- Written by: Ira Steven Behr; Robert Hewitt Wolfe
- Production code: 512
- Original air date: February 10, 1997

Guest appearances
- Andrew J. Robinson as Garak; Marc Alaimo as Gul Dukat; Melanie Smith as Ziyal; J. G. Hertzler as Martok; Paul Dooley as Enabran Tain; James Horan as Ikat'ika

Episode chronology
← Previous "For the Uniform"	Next → "By Inferno's Light"
- Star Trek: Deep Space Nine season 5

"In Purgatory's Shadow" is the 112th episode of the television series Star Trek: Deep Space Nine, the 14th episode of the fifth season. The episode premiered on February 10, 1997, to a Nielsen rating of 6.7 points. It is the first half of a two-part episode, with the second half, "By Inferno's Light", first airing a week later.

Set in the 24th century, the series follows the adventures of the crew of the space station Deep Space Nine near the planet Bajor, as the Bajorans recover from a decades-long occupation by the imperialistic Cardassians. The station is adjacent to a wormhole connecting the Alpha and Gamma Quadrants of the galaxy; the Gamma Quadrant is home to an expansionist empire known as the Dominion, ruled by the shape-shifting Changelings. This episode begins the Dominion's invasion of the Alpha Quadrant, a plot arc which continues until the final episode of the series. It features the return of several characters, drawing on plot lines previously established in the third, fourth and fifth seasons.

This episode is dedicated "In memory of Derek Garth", a grip for the series who died in an automobile accident in December, eight weeks before the episode aired.

== Plot ==
When Deep Space Nine picks up a mysterious coded message from inside the Gamma Quadrant that appears to be Cardassian, exiled Cardassian spy Garak is asked to analyze it. He tells everyone that the message was a harmless report from years ago, but Dr. Bashir sees through his lie and catches him trying to sneak away on a ship. He reveals that the message is a distress call from his mentor Enabran Tain, who was believed to have been killed in an ill-fated Cardassian attack on the Dominion two years prior. Garak convinces Captain Sisko to allow him to travel to the Gamma Quadrant, accompanied by Lt. Cmdr. Worf, to search for Tain and other possible survivors from Dominion attacks.

Soon after entering Dominion space, their efforts to evade detection by passing through a nebula lead Garak and Worf to encounter a Dominion fleet hiding within the nebula; Worf realizes that the fleet must be assembled to invade the Alpha Quadrant. He sends a warning message to DS9 just before Jem'Hadar soldiers take him and Garak prisoner. Back on DS9, the crew receives Worf's message and realize the Dominion is coming. With reinforcements at least two days away and only disgraced Cardassian officer Dukat (on the station due to a confrontation with a Klingon battle cruiser) on hand to help out, Sisko sees only one choice—sealing the wormhole, trapping Worf and Garak on the other side if they cannot return before the operation is completed.

Worf and Garak are taken to a Dominion detention center. Tain is there, on his deathbed; instead of being thankful to Garak for coming, Tain chastises him for allowing himself to be taken prisoner. Also, among the fellow prisoners are the Klingon general Martok, and, to Garak and Worf's surprise, Dr. Julian Bashir—meaning that the Bashir back at DS9 is a Changeling impostor.

As his last request, Tain makes Garak promise to escape. Desperate for a kind word from his mentor before the old man passes on, Garak makes a request in return: that Tain acknowledge him as his son. Tain does so, and father and son share a memory before Tain dies peacefully. His mission complete, Garak is ready to find a way out.

On Deep Space Nine, the crew shoots a particle beam at the wormhole, intending to close it. However, the beam fails due to the emitter array having been sabotaged and the wormhole remains open, allowing a fleet of Dominion warships to begin pouring through.

== Reception ==
Zach Handlen of The A.V. Club said this was a good cliffhanger but that "it's hard to really say how any of this fits together before we get to next week's second half." He found some of the setup and character scenes dragged and were a little frustrating at times but appreciated how the episode brought things into greater focus.

In 2015, Geek.com recommended this episode as "essential watching" for their abbreviated Star Trek: Deep Space Nine binge-watching guide.

In 2018, CBR rated "In Purgatory's Shadow" paired with "By Inferno's Light", as the 9th best multi-episode story arc of all of Star Trek. Nerdist included this episode in their binge-watching guide for the Dominion War saga of this series.

In 2020, Doux Reviews said, "In Purgatory's Shadow" was "one of the best-written episodes of Deep Space Nine" and had a great cliffhanger ending.

In 2020, The Digital Fix ranked "In Purgatory's Shadow" and "By Inferno's Light" as the fourth best episode(s) of Deep Space Nine. They call the episodes an "epic two-parter" that took the show's "long-running narrative to another level" and praised the various plot lines and reveals.

== Continuity ==
In 2019, Nerdist recommended starting with this episode as part of a story arc that covers the start of the Dominion War. They named a selection of episodes concluding with "Sacrifice of Angels", the 6th episode of season six.

The episodes they recommended for this story arc included:

- "In Purgatory's Shadow"
- "By Inferno's Light"
- "Call to Arms"
- "A Time to Stand"
- "Rocks and Shoals"
- "Sons and Daughters"
- "Behind the Lines"
- "Favor the Bold"
- "Sacrifice of Angels"
