= Martok =

Fictional character from Star Trek: Deep Space Nine, played by J. G. Hertzler

- Star Trek character
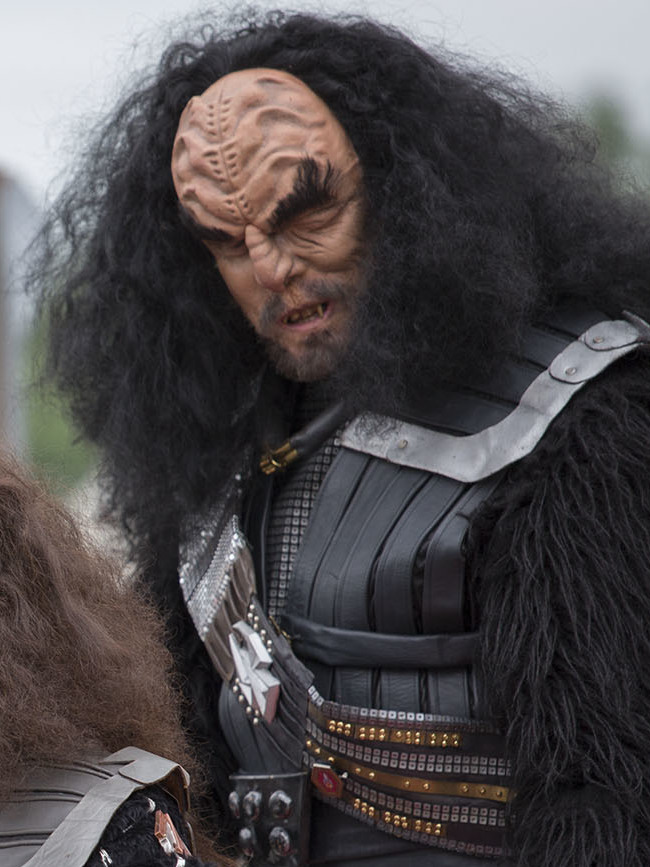
- J. G. Hertzler as Martok (2014)
- Portrayed by: J. G. Hertzler

In-universe information
- Species: Klingon
- Affiliation: Klingon Defense Force
- Posting: Rotarran, Deep Space Nine, Qo'noS
- Position: General of Klingon Empire; Chancellor of the Klingon Empire
- Rank: General, Chancellor

Martok, son of Urthog is a recurring character in Star Trek: Deep Space Nine, played by actor J. G. Hertzler. Martok is a high-ranking Klingon leader at the Federation-Bajoran space station in the late 2300s. Martok figures prominently in many of the show's long running story arcs, and also is an important relationship for Worf.

== Concept and production ==
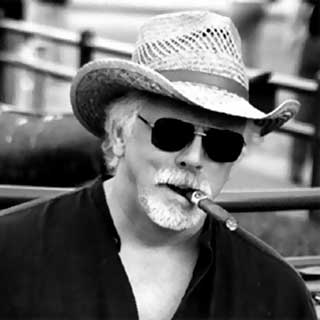
J. G. Hertzler was cast in this role.

J. G. Hertzler made his first appearance in the franchise in the Star Trek: Deep Space Nine pilot episode, "Emissary", as a Vulcan Captain who is killed when his vessel is destroyed. Following this, he made his first appearance as a Klingon in the video game Star Trek: Klingon, directed by Jonathan Frakes and also starring Robert O'Reilly as Chancellor Gowron. When the producers of Deep Space Nine were casting Martok, Hertzler auditioned after initially not considering the role but found himself getting angry during the interview due to a comment from the director which he felt was insulting. However, this response led to him gaining the role, and it was included as a character trait for Martok.

It took around three hours each day for the make-up to be applied to Hertzler by David Quashnick, who was the "specialist" who did both Hertzler and O'Reilly's Klingon make-up. Hertzler did not mind the process, but stated that having the prostheses block the sight in his left side could sometimes make filming difficult as he could not see when turning that way. He felt it was important to the character to remind him of the time spent on the Dominion prison world, and turned down the opportunity to have Martok's sight restored when it was suggested by executive producer Ira Steven Behr. In particular, Hertzler felt it gave the same air to Martok as Christopher Plummer's character in Star Trek VI: The Undiscovered Country.

In 2020, Hertzler talked about developing the character: "As a stage actor you usually get some weeks to rehearse, if you get lucky, and then you go on. And with Martok, I was able to work on him for four years. Now I am still doing it 25 years later!"

In an interview with Heavy in 2021, Hertzler discussed how it was working with the cast of Deep Space Nine. He found it was intimidating at first, because the regular cast had worked with each other for years, and the Martok character had to "boss people around." However, he found the other actors welcomed him and helped him feel like he belonged.

== Appearances ==
=== Background ===
Little backstory is given regarding the early life of Martok, except for a brief history sketched by himself in the Deep Space Nine episode "Once More Unto the Breach". It is known that he was born into a Klingon house (The House of Martok) that was not part of the aristocracy and was raised in the Ket'ha lowlands on the Klingon homeworld of Qo'noS. This area is considered a wasteland by the Klingons.

Martok's family had been loyal soldiers of the Klingon Empire for 15 generations, but never officers. It was Urthog's long-held wish that Martok become an officer, so he enlisted the aid of officers whose respect he had earned, and convinced one to sponsor his son's application to the Klingon academy. They submitted the application to the Oversight Committee, believing that approval would be a mere formality, but was rejected by one member, the legendary Klingon warrior Kor, who held elitist views regarding the honor and prestige of the "great houses". With such a rejection on his record, Martok could no longer even serve as a common soldier. He chose to serve, regardless, and spent five years on General ShiVang's flagship as a civilian laborer. When the ship was surprised by a Romulan attack, Martok took up arms and helped repel the enemy boarding party. His skill and bravery earned him a battlefield commission, but the honour was soured by the fact that Urthog had died some years earlier and couldn't share in his son's glory. Martok later earned the rank of Lieutenant after the Battle of Tcha'voth, becoming tactical officer aboard the cruiser Gothspar under Captain Kultan (ST:DS9 Books: The Left Hand of Destiny), and by his introduction to the series, he had attained the rank of General and still held a grudge against Kor.

=== General Martok ===
Around 2371, Martok was abducted by agents of the Dominion and replaced with a shapeshifter. The exact date of this is unclear. The changeling was successful at beginning the war with the Cardassians (S4, E1) but inadvertently revealed himself to Odo (who had been misled into believing that Chancellor Gowron was the changeling) at a Klingon award ceremony, and was quickly killed by the Klingons attending the ceremony (S5, E1).

The real Martok spent two years in a Dominion internment camp, forced to fight Jem'Hadar soldiers daily in hand-to-hand combat for training purposes. Presumably it was during one of these fights that his left eye was gouged out. During his confinement, Martok came to respect the indomitable character and fighting qualities of Worf. In the episode "By Inferno's Light", Martok escapes and returns to the Alpha Quadrant with Elim Garak, Worf and Julian Bashir, and is made commander of the Klingon forces on Deep Space Nine.

Weeks after this new assignment, Martok took command of a Klingon Bird-of-Prey, the Rotarran, and made it his personal flagship. Initially, the Rotarran's crew were beaten and fatalistic, a fact that was made worse by Martok's apparent reluctance to engage Jem'Hadar forces on their first mission. Eventually, a confrontation between Martok and Worf helped rally both the crew's warrior spirit as well as Martok's. The mission would conclude with the Rotarran engaging and destroying a Jem'Hadar vessel and rescuing thirty-five crewmen from a disabled Klingon ship. A grateful Martok would later invite Worf (who had earlier been stripped of his family name by Gowron) to join Martok's house.

Martok is portrayed as an excellent judge of character, caring deeply about those under his command. This, in turn, earned him great respect among fellow Klingons, since while they have a love for battle and conquest, they also have a very low opinion of those who wantonly throw soldiers into battle with little regard for their safety or well-being. These traits, along with his courage and leadership skills, would serve him well in the Dominion War, during which he fought in several battles, including the battle to retake Deep Space Nine, and the First and Second Battle of Chin'toka. Despite his humble background, or perhaps because of it, Martok would become extremely popular among other Klingon warriors and the civilian population, because he climbed his way up the ranks honorably, though Martok himself repeatedly stated he had no interest in politics. Eventually, he was made Supreme Commander of the Ninth Fleet, a position he initially resented because of the amount of paperwork involved. Like most Klingons, Martok had a disdain for Ferengi, which manifested itself in several refusals to even acknowledge Nog, who at the time was a Starfleet Cadet. It isn't until Nog stands up to Martok and directly challenges him that Martok begins to display a grudging respect for the young Ferengi (episodes "Soldiers of the Empire", "Blaze of Glory").

Shortly before the end of the war ("When It Rains…"), Gowron comes to Deep Space Nine to honor Martok by inducting him into the Order of Kahless, and then announces that he would be taking control of the Klingon forces from Martok because it was time for him to "take a more active role in the war". However, it becomes clear that Gowron is simply worried about Martok getting too powerful politically, and intends to usurp Martok's standing by sending him into battles that he cannot win. Worf tries to convince Martok to challenge Gowron, but he refuses, saying he is a loyal soldier of the Empire and has no desire whatsoever to enter politics, let alone become Chancellor. Worf then kills Gowron himself, and rather than accept the title of Chancellor, gives it to Martok ("Tacking into the Wind").

=== Chancellor Martok ===
When the Dominion forces suddenly withdrew into Cardassian territory, the Allies realized that they were withdrawing in order to gain time to recover from their battle wounds, so that they could come back stronger a few years later.

Martok believed that the Empire should attack right away, and convinced the Federation and Romulans to attack as well. Martok, leading the Klingon fleet; Admiral Ross and Captain Sisko, leading the Federation fleet; and the Romulans attacked and defeated the Dominion on the Cardassian homeworld.

Despite the refusal of Admiral Ross and Captain Sisko (who were horrified by the sight of being surrounded by so many dead Cardassians) to drink bloodwine with Martok in the halls of Cardassian Central Command, something most Klingons would consider a grave insult, Martok simply shook his head and said that humans didn't understand, with the Federation and Klingons remaining staunch allies. Martok is happy to receive Lt. Commander Worf as the Federation Ambassador to Qo'noS. He comments that he now has an Ambassador that he can go targ hunting with and that, for this reason, "perhaps being Chancellor won't be so bad after all". Shortly after the end of the war, Martok and Worf leave DS9 for Qo'noS ("What You Leave Behind").

=== Personal life ===
Martok is the son of Urthog, and is an only child. He grew up in the Ketha province on Qo'noS. Urthog did not live to see his son become an officer; Martok holds a grudge against Kor for robbing his father of that honour.

Martok is married to Sirella, a noble woman. They have one son, Drex ("You Are Cordially Invited", "The Way of the Warrior") Martok views marriage as another form of combat, albeit one disguised and more subtle than most ("The Changing Face of Evil").

After Worf joined Martok's house, Worf's son Alexander would be inducted into the house as well, as would Jadzia Dax upon her marriage to Worf (the marriage was initially opposed by Sirella). After Jadzia's death, Martok would come to regard Dax's new host Ezri as a worthy successor to Jadzia and would consider her part of his house as well.

Martok's first appearances on Star Trek: Deep Space Nine (in "The Way of the Warrior, Parts I and II" and "Apocalypse Rising") were actually the Changeling infiltrator posing as Martok. The real Martok did not appear onscreen until "In Purgatory's Shadow".

The Mirror Universe version of Martok has only appeared in the novels. Unlike the regular Martok, who is an honorable and caring commander, the MU version is foul-mouthed, slovenly and cruel. He is eventually killed by the mirror counterpart of Klag, who assumes Martok's role as Regent of the Klingon-Cardassian Alliance.

Season 4

- The Way of the Warrior, Parts I and II
  - this is a Changeling, impersonating Martok

Season 5

- Apocalypse Rising
  - this is a Changeling, impersonating Martok
- In Purgatory's Shadow
  - first appearance of the "real" Martok
- By Inferno's Light
- Soldiers of the Empire
- Blaze of Glory
- Call to Arms

Season 6

- A Time to Stand
- Sons and Daughters
- Favor the Bold
- Sacrifice of Angels
- You Are Cordially Invited
- Far Beyond the Stars
- Tears of the Prophets

Season 7

- Image in the Sand
- Shadows and Symbols
- Treachery, Faith, and the Great River
- Once More Unto the Breach
- The Emperor's New Cloak
- Strange Bedfellows
- The Changing Face of Evil
- When It Rains…
- Tacking into the Wind
- The Dogs of War
- What You Leave Behind, Parts I and II

Lower Decks

- The Least Dangerous Game

== Reception and analysis ==
In 2015, SyFy rated Martok among the top 21 most interesting supporting characters of Star Trek, and in 2019, SyFy rated Martok as the #1 greatest and "most Klingon-y" Klingon of the Star Trek franchise. Tara Bennett called him "legendary." In 2016, ScreenRant ranked the character Martok as the 12th best Star Trek character overall, in between Worf (#13) and Sarek (#11). They describe Martok as a "Klingon's Klingon", but instead of being obsessed with battle he appears as "battle-worn, flinty, and grateful to be alive", while Victor Grech highlights the instances where Martok embraces warfare.

In 2018, CBR ranked this character 10th best recurring character of all Star Trek.

Producer Ira Steven Behr's impression from "The Way of the Warrior" was "Gee, this guy Martok is great", and he decided to make him a recurring character. He described Martok as "a great Klingon. Very charismatic and fun."

Uwe Meyer characterizes Martok as an upright person of integrity, who in this regard stands in direct contrast and conflict to his predecessor, the erratic and self-serving Gowron. Martok is committed to family loyalty and follows a code of honour that is especially visible in times of war. Douglas Mann calls it "the Homeric code of the Klingon warrior" and compares it to that of ancient Sparta and the warriors of Mycenean culture as depicted in the Illiad.

Meyer sees elements of the Cold War reflected in the Star Trek franchise, with the Federation representing the West and the Klingon Empire the USSR and Russia. In this context, Martok represents a Klingon character who is not explicitly Westernized like Worf, but still pays homage to the liberal values of the West to a significant degree. This characterization - bar the political connotations - is supported by a discussion documented by Karl Spracklen: Martok has been exposed to human culture enough to laugh off the refusal of his Federation allies to celebrate a victory the Klingon way with him, where another Klingon might have been offended. Martok's chancellorship is compared by Meyer to the position of Mikhail Gorbachev in the USSR, as a representative of the ruling elite who recognizes the shortcomings and divisions of his society and strives for reform. In this role Martok is also similar to the character of Azetbur from Star Trek VI: The Undiscovered Country. She was denied significant success as a lone reformer. Whether Martok can fulfill the hopes invested in him is an open question at the end of his arc.

Uwe Meyer also states that Martok conforms to the stereotype of the simple, honest soldier, who is not well-versed in the intrigues associated with a negatively connoted political class, and is more like a politician should be because of it. That he was often victorious in battle is presented as adding to his aptitude, comparable to a number of former military officers who have achieved the U.S. presidency.
