= Favor the Bold =

- Star Trek: Deep Space Nine episode
- Episode no.: Season 6 Episode 5
- Directed by: Winrich Kolbe
- Written by: Ira Steven Behr; Hans Beimler
- Production code: 529
- Original air date: October 27, 1997

Guest appearances
- Andrew Robinson as Elim Garak; Jeffrey Combs as Weyoun; Marc Alaimo as Gul Dukat; Max Grodénchik as Rom; Aron Eisenberg as Nog; J. G. Hertzler as General Martok; Melanie Smith as Tora Ziyal; Casey Biggs as Damar; Chase Masterson as Leeta; Barry Jenner as Admiral Ross; Salome Jens as Female Changeling

Episode chronology
← Previous "Behind the Lines"	Next → "Sacrifice of Angels"
- Star Trek: Deep Space Nine season 6

"Favor the Bold" is the 129th episode of the science fiction television series Star Trek: Deep Space Nine, the fifth episode of the sixth season, first broadcast on October 27, 1997. This episode had Nielsen ratings of 6.0 points, which equaled about 5.9 million viewers.

Set in the 24th century, the series follows the adventures of the crew of Deep Space Nine, a space station near the planet Bajor, guarding a wormhole that leads to the Gamma Quadrant on the opposite side of the galaxy; the Gamma Quadrant is home to a hostile empire known as the Dominion. This episode continues the narrative of the Dominion War that has extended over the first few episodes of the sixth season, during which the Dominion and their Cardassian allies have seized control of Deep Space Nine, and the United Federation of Planets prepares to attempt to reconquer it. "Favor the Bold" is the first half of a two-part episode; its story is concluded in the following episode, "Sacrifice of Angels".

== Plot ==
Captain Benjamin Sisko decides to retake Deep Space Nine in order to bolster sagging Federation morale. He plans a large force in order to do so but it will take some time to assemble. The Klingon general Martok and his first officer Worf are sent to convince the Klingon High Council to send ships to join the attack.

On Deep Space Nine, the Ferengi technician Rom is sentenced to execution for attempting to foil the Dominion's plan to destroy the minefield blocking the wormhole. The minefield is the only thing keeping Dominion reinforcements from arriving from the Gamma Quadrant. Major Kira Nerys, the Bajoran liaison officer secretly leading the resistance against Dominion occupation, pleads for mercy for Rom with Weyoun, the station's Dominion administrator, but to no avail. Kira persuades Tora Ziyal, the daughter of Cardassian commander Dukat, to ask her father to show mercy, but he too is adamant, which distresses her belief that her father was a man of peace. Security officer Odo is no help; he is seduced by an offer to return to his people, the shapeshifting Founders of the Dominion, and has lost interest in station affairs.

Cardassian officer Damar lets slip to the bartender Quark that the minefield will be eliminated in about a week. Quark passes this intelligence to Kira's resistance, and Sisko's son Jake, who remained on the station when the Dominion seized control of it, is able to sneak a message to his father alerting him to the minefield's impending destruction. Dukat tries through Damar to get his daughter to be by his side for what seems to be impending success, but the attempt leads to Kira punching Damar out when Ziyal refuses. Sisko realizes he must take the station now, though his fleet is nowhere near large enough. With a fleet consisting of 600 vessels, Sisko arrives near Deep Space Nine facing a Cardassian-Dominion fleet of 1254 ships. He turns to his crew and says "There's an old saying: 'Fortune favours the bold'. I guess we're about to find out," as the operation begins.

== Reception ==
This episode was first broadcast October 27, 1997. It Nielsen ratings of 6.0 points, which equaled about 5.9 million viewers. It was the third highest rated episode of the season.

io9 ranked "Favor the Bold " when paired with "Sacrifice of Angels", as the 88th best episodic presentation of Star Trek in a 2014 listing.

A 2015 binge-watching guide for Star Trek: Deep Space Nine by Wired recommended not skipping this essential episode.

In 2015, Geek.com recommended this episode as "essential watching" for their abbreviated Star Trek: Deep Space Nine binge-watching guide.

In 2016, The Washington Post called the Dominion war story arc possibly the "richest narrative" of the Star Trek universe.

In 2018, SyFy recommend this episode for its abbreviated watch guide for the Bajoran character Kira Nerys. They recommend it as part of sequence of seven episodes including "Call to Arms," "A Time to Stand," "Rocks and Shoals," "Sons and Daughters," "Behind the Lines," "Favor the Bold" and "Sacrifice of Angels"; this includes from the season finale of Season 5 and the first six episodes of Season 6 of the show.

In 2018, CBR rated "Favor the Bold" paired with "Sacrifice of Angels" (the following episode), as the third best multi-episode story arc of all Star Trek.

== See also ==
- Fortune favours the bold (English translation of old Latin maxim)
