= Call to Arms (Star Trek: Deep Space Nine) =

- Star Trek: Deep Space Nine episode
- Episode no.: Season 5 Episode 26
- Directed by: Allan Kroeker
- Written by: Ira Steven Behr; Robert Hewitt Wolfe
- Production code: 524
- Original air date: June 16, 1997

Guest appearances
- Andrew J. Robinson as Elim Garak; Jeffrey Combs as Weyoun; Marc Alaimo as Dukat; J. G. Hertzler as General Martok; Chase Masterson as Leeta; Melanie Smith as Tora Ziyal

Episode chronology
← Previous "In the Cards"	Next → "A Time to Stand"
- Star Trek: Deep Space Nine season 5

"Call to Arms" is the 26th and final episode of the fifth season of the science fiction television series Star Trek: Deep Space Nine, the 124th episode overall. This episode marks the start of the show's celebrated Dominion war story arc.

Set in the 24th century, the series follows the adventures on the Starfleet-run space station Deep Space Nine near the planet Bajor, as the Bajorans recover from a decades-long occupation by the imperialistic Cardassians. The station guards the entrance to a wormhole connecting Bajor with the distant Gamma Quadrant, which is home to an aggressive empire known as the Dominion. In this episode, the Deep Space Nine crew respond to the Dominion's recent annexation and fortification of Cardassia by deploying mines to prevent further Dominion incursions from the Gamma Quadrant, and the Dominion responds by attacking Deep Space Nine.

At the end of this episode, the Dominion captures Deep Space Nine; this leads into a six-episode story arc at the beginning of the sixth season depicting life on DS9 under Dominion occupation and Starfleet's efforts to retake the station. Many recurring characters make appearances in this episode, including Garak, Weyoun, Dukat, Martok, Leeta and Ziyal.

== Plot ==
Upon learning that the Romulans and other major powers have signed non-aggression pacts with the Dominion, Starfleet Command orders Captain Benjamin Sisko to prevent further Dominion reinforcements from reaching Cardassia from their home territory in the Gamma Quadrant. DS9 crew members Jadzia Dax, Miles O'Brien, and Rom devise a plan to block the wormhole with a field of self-replicating, cloaked mines. The mines cannot be activated until they are entirely deployed, which will take some time to complete. Shortly after deployment begins, Dominion representative Weyoun declares that Deep Space Nine will be attacked unless the mines are removed.

Since Starfleet reinforcements are unavailable, Sisko asks the Klingon General Martok to patrol the border while the Defiant continues deployment. Sisko endorses the non-aggression pact offered to Bajor by the Dominion, in the hope that it will keep Bajor out of the coming war. Sisko officiates Rom's marriage to his fiancée Leeta before she and other Bajorans evacuate the station as a result of the non-aggression agreement.

Starfleet personnel remain to defend the station until the mines are completely deployed. Dominion forces attack and are met by DS9's armaments and Martok's vessel, the Rotarran. After the minefield is activated, Sisko orders the Starfleet personnel to evacuate as well, surrendering DS9 to the Dominion. He announces that while the Dominion was occupied with DS9, a combined Starfleet/Klingon task force wiped out an important Dominion shipyard. During the evacuation, Dax and her lover Worf are assigned to separate ships, and agree to marry if they survive the war.

Captain Sisko's son Jake remains on DS9 to serve as a reporter for the Federation News Service while the station is occupied by the Dominion. Rom remains as well, acting as a spy for Starfleet while working at his brother Quark's bar. Bajoran liaison officer Kira disables the station's systems by activating a pre-set computer program; and then she, Quark and security chief Odo welcome the Dominion occupiers, led by Weyoun and the Cardassian Gul Dukat, to the station. Dukat reclaims the station commander's office, where he finds the baseball Sisko left behind – a message to him that Sisko will return.

Sisko is upset to learn that Jake has remained behind, but cannot return to DS9 and jeopardize his crew for the sake of one man, even his own son. Soon, the Defiant and Rotarran join a massive armada of Starfleet and Klingon vessels.

== Production ==
Deep Space Nine was produced during a transition period between motion-control work with physical models and computer-generated images. "Call to Arms" used a mixture of older-type model work such as motion control and computer-generated special effects. Production of the motion-control shots took weeks to get the desired look.

This episode used a fictional spacecraft design, called the Akira-class, which was previously used in the Star Trek universe in the 1996 film Star Trek: First Contact. The Akira-class design was shown again on this television show in the episodes "Tears of the Prophets" and "What You Leave Behind".

== Reception ==
Keith DeCandido of Tor.com rated the episode ten out of ten.

A 2015 binge-watching guide for Star Trek: Deep Space Nine by Wired recommended this as an essential episode.

In 2015, Geek.com recommended this episode as "essential watching" for their abbreviated Star Trek: Deep Space Nine binge-watching guide, noting that this is the start of the Dominion war and involves the Gamma-quadrant wormhole by Deep Space Nine.

In 2016, The Hollywood Reporter rated "Call to Arms" sixth out of all Star Trek: Deep Space Nine episodes. In 2016, Gizmodo rated "Call to Arms" 31st out all Star Trek television episodes produced up to that time. This episode is noted for bringing together many narratives and character arcs developed over the course of the fifth (1996–1997) season, and moves them forward into a significant conclusion.

In 2018, SyFy recommended this episode for its abbreviated watch guide for the Bajoran character Kira Nerys. They recommend it as sequence including the episodes "Call to Arms," "A Time to Stand," "Rocks and Shoals," "Sons and Daughters," "Behind the Lines," "Favor the Bold" and "Sacrifice of Angels"; this includes from the season finale of Season 5 and the first six episodes of Season 6 of the show. They note that in this episode Kira is left behind on the station once again under Cardassian control.

In 2019, Comicbook.com ranked "Call to Arms" the ninth best episode of Star Trek: Deep Space Nine, pointing out for the first time in the Star Trek franchise, a large war started involving the Federation.
