= A Time to Stand =

- Star Trek: Deep Space Nine episode
- Episode no.: Season 6 Episode 1
- Directed by: Allan Kroeker
- Written by: Ira Steven Behr, Hans Beimler
- Production code: 525
- Original air date: September 29, 1997

Guest appearances
- Brock Peters as Joseph Sisko; Andrew Robinson as Garak; Jeffrey Combs as Weyoun; Marc Alaimo as Gul Dukat; Aron Eisenberg as Nog; J. G. Hertzler as General Martok; Casey Biggs as Damar; Barry Jenner as Admiral Ross

Episode chronology
← Previous "Call to Arms"	Next → "Rocks and Shoals"
- Star Trek: Deep Space Nine season 6

"A Time to Stand" is the first episode of the sixth season of the television series Star Trek: Deep Space Nine, and the 125th episode overall. This episode was broadcast on television starting on September 29, 1997.

Set in the 24th century, the series follows the adventures of the crew of the Starfleet-managed Bajoran space station Deep Space Nine, as Bajor recovers from a brutal decades-long occupation by the imperialistic Cardassians. The station is adjacent to a wormhole leading to the distant Gamma Quadrant of the galaxy, which is home to a hostile empire known as the Dominion, ruled by the shape-shifting Changelings. The fifth season finale, "Call to Arms", saw war break out between the United Federation of Planets and the Dominion, with the Dominion taking control of Deep Space Nine.

The sixth season begins several months into the Dominion War, with the allied Dominion-Cardassian forces stationed at Deep Space Nine, commanded by Gul Dukat and Weyoun, while DS9's erstwhile captain Benjamin Sisko is about to lead a raiding mission deep into Cardassian territory. The episode is the first of a six-episode story arc telling the story of Deep Space Nine under Dominion occupation, until it is recaptured by the Federation in the sixth episode of the season, "Sacrifice of Angels".

== Plot ==
Three months after the events of "Call to Arms", the Federation-Klingon alliance is badly losing the Dominion War. After hearing news that the Seventh Fleet was almost obliterated, Captain Sisko and his crew are assigned to pilot a captured Dominion ship into Dominion/Cardassian territory and destroy a valuable stockpile of Ketracel White, the drug that controls the Dominion's Jem'Hadar foot soldiers.

The navigational eyepieces used on the stolen Dominion vessel induce headaches in Captain Sisko. Cardassian ex-spy Elim Garak, an informant for Sisko's crew, observes that the eyepieces seem to have no ill-effects on Cardassians, so he volunteers to wear the device. Later, Sisko's ship is fired upon by the USS Centaur, unaware that Sisko's ship is staffed by fellow Federation officers, and Sisko is forced to return fire. Both ships escape but the danger is not over yet: the Starfleet officers are now deep behind enemy lines.

They succeed in destroying the Ketracel White depot, but the ship's engines are damaged in the explosion; without the use of warp drive, they are many years' journey from home.

Meanwhile, on Dominion-occupied DS9, friction arises between Dukat and Weyoun. Dukat is optimistic about how well the war is going for the Dominion-Cardassian alliance; but he has not yet been able to disable the minefield blocking passage to the wormhole, and Weyoun reminds him they are vulnerable without reinforcement and resupply from the Gamma Quadrant.

Bajoran Major Kira Nerys is uncomfortably reminded of the Cardassian occupation of Bajor, but Quark points out that the Dominion's occupation of DS9 is far less brutal, and the Dominion is holding the Cardassians in check. Sisko's son Jake is on DS9 as a reporter for the Federation News Service, but Weyoun claims his articles are biased against the Dominion, and refuses to broadcast them until he sees "open-mindedness".

Dukat refuses to employ Bajoran security deputies, to the frustration of security chief Odo, a rogue Changeling not affiliated with the Dominion. Major Kira convinces Odo to use his status as a Changeling to get what he wants. Genetically programmed to see him as a god, Weyoun instantly accepts Odo's request to reinstate his deputies. Odo is also offered a seat on the station's ruling council, giving him a voice in station policy. He accepts.

== Reception ==
A 2015 binge-watching guide for Star Trek: Deep Space Nine by Wired recommended not skipping this essential episode.

In 2015, Geek.com recommended this episode as "essential watching" for their abbreviated Star Trek: Deep Space Nine binge-watching guide.

In 2016, The Hollywood Reporter rated "A Time to Stand" with the first six episodes of the season, collectively the 38th best episode of all Star Trek television episodes.

In 2016, The Hollywood Reporter also rated "A Time to Stand" along with six following episodes as among the twenty greatest episodes (or sequences of episodes) in Star Trek: Deep Space Nine. This six-episode arc is noted for its serialized format, compared to shorter two-episode pair stories that had been more common to the Star Trek franchise up to that time.

In 2018, SyFy recommend this episode for its abbreviated watch guide for the Bajoran character Kira Nerys. They also recommend watching it as a sequence including previous episode "Call to Arms," then "A Time to Stand," followed by "Rocks and Shoals," "Sons and Daughters," "Behind the Lines," "Favor the Bold" and "Sacrifice of Angels"; this includes from the season finale of Season 5 and the first six episodes of Season 6 of the show, for a total of seven episodes.
