= Elim Garak =

Fictional character from Star Trek: Deep Space Nine

- Star Trek character
- First appearance: "Past Prologue"; Star Trek: Deep Space Nine; 1993
- Last appearance: "Fissure Quest"; Star Trek: Lower Decks; 2024
- Portrayed by: Andrew J. Robinson

In-universe information
- Species: Cardassian
- Gender: male
- Occupation: tailor, spy
- Affiliation: Formerly the Obsidian Order; Starfleet (Special Operative)
- Family: Enabran Tain (Father) (Deceased); Mila (Mother) (Deceased)
- Posting: Cardassian Embassy on Romulus; Deep Space Nine (exile)

Elim Garak (/ˈiːlɪm ˈɡærək/ EE-lim GARR-ək) is a fictional character from the television series Star Trek: Deep Space Nine, in which he is portrayed by Andrew J. Robinson.

In the series, Garak is an exiled spy from the Cardassian Union and a former member of the feared Cardassian intelligence group called the Obsidian Order. Garak was exiled to the space station that became known as Deep Space Nine and established a tailoring business there. While during most episodes of the series he is indeed a harmless tailor, he is also a complex character whose portrayal often hints at hidden secrets and a back-story, and he displays competence in a wide range of skills and knowledge in a crisis. Garak sometimes willfully or coincidentally plays a role in covert operations on the side of the United Federation of Planets running Deep Space Nine. Occasionally, other Cardassians warn Federation personnel that he is "a very dangerous man with a traitorous mind", but in general he plays a rather positive, though sometimes sinister or multilayered, role during the series.

From a production standpoint, Garak's character was expanded from a planned one-time appearance into a pivotal and complex character. Robinson's portrayal of Garak also prompted discussion about his character's sexuality, with Robinson describing Garak as omnisexual while others interpreted him as gay or bisexual.

== Role ==
Garak is introduced in the third episode of the first season of Deep Space Nine, "Past Prologue". He appears in the replimat on Deep Space Nine, where he introduces himself to the station's doctor, Julian Bashir, as Garak, a tailor exiled from Cardassia. In the same episode, it is discovered that Garak was known as "The Spy" to the crew of Deep Space Nine, as the only Cardassian left on the station after Cardassia ended their occupation of the nearby planet, Bajor.

Garak often denied involvement with the feared Cardassian intelligence agency, the Obsidian Order, only later to reveal a likely connection. As Garak's friendship with Bashir develops, it is revealed that he was one of the Obsidian Order's highest ranking operatives, and that he was exiled from Cardassia for unspecified reasons. It is suggested that his exile resulted from either letting prisoners escape during the occupation of Bajor, or the betrayal of Enabran Tain, head of the Order, who is later revealed to be Garak's resentful biological father. Garak's secrecy keeps him a character of interest and importance; he later uses his contacts with Cardassia and his training in the Obsidian Order to assist the Federation in the war against the Dominion. Garak appears in 37 of the 176 episodes of Deep Space Nine, including the series finale, and appears in each of the seven seasons.

== Portrayal ==
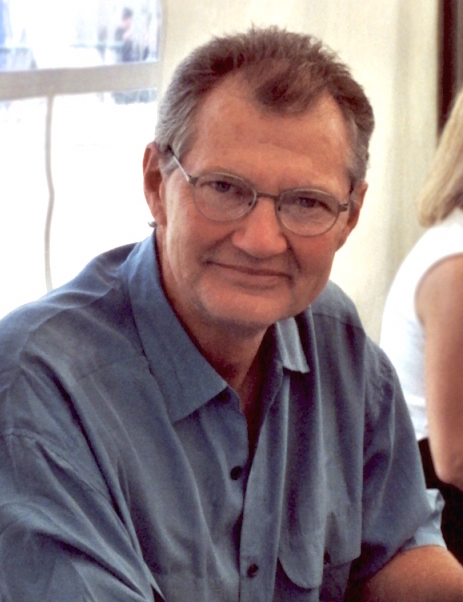
Andrew Robinson in 2000

Garak was intended to be a one-off character; Robinson said that he portrayed the character in the episode for the simple fact that he needed money for that month to pay his bills. The producers were impressed with Robinson's performance and decided to develop the character after Robinson agreed to return. The decision to incorporate Garak into more of the series led to Garak becoming a pivotal character—transforming him into a character of importance with unusual complexity and resonance.

Robinson's initial performance as Garak received scrutiny as his portrayal was interpreted as Garak being homosexual or bisexual. In particular, Robinson portrayed Garak as having sexual interest in Bashir, and he used that as character motivation as an actor. Robinson denied that his portrayal was intended to portray Garak as homosexual and stated that he was omnisexual. As a result of the controversy, Robinson removed the particular characteristic from Garak.

I had planned Garak not as homosexual or heterosexual but omnisexual, and the first episode I had with Bashir played that way gave people fits. So I had to remove that characteristic from him.

— Andrew J. Robinson

Garak changes from a simple mysterious character to one of complexity and secrecy. Robinson stated that the complexity of Garak's character did not come from his lies, but rather his refusal to elaborate on himself.

The important thing about Garak is that he lives in the subtext. Again, with the iceberg analogy, the substance of Garak is what you don't hear. It's what he doesn't say.

— Andrew J. Robinson

Producer and showrunner Ira Behr said that the character was gay, "Garak was clearly gay. I mean, everyone knew it." Behr said the character was played as such but was not openly declared because the studio would not have approved. Writer Robert Hewitt Wolfe, who wrote a number of episodes with Garak in them, has also stated he wrote the character as gay or bisexual and that "it would not be wrong to interpret Garak as bisexual."

In the 2024 episode "Fissure Quest", of the series Star Trek: Lower Decks, a Garak and a sentient hologram Bashir – each from different alternate universes – are a married couple in the canon Star Trek universe.

== Character overview ==
Garak has a long-standing antagonistic relationship with the prefect of Bajor, Gul Dukat. In the episode "Civil Defense", Dukat states that it was a mistake for his father to have once trusted Garak and later in "For the Cause", it is revealed that Garak had Dukat's father tortured and killed. During the occupation of Bajor, Garak was a Gul serving the Cardassian mechanized infantry, or so Garak tells Bashir during the episode "The Wire". The episode "The Die is Cast", in which Garak was (briefly) reinstated to the Obsidian Order, there is mention of an incident with Dukat and Garak that involved an arms merchant, with Garak admitting he plans to kill Dukat when he returns to Cardassia. Later, Garak fell from grace and was exiled from Cardassia. He fled to the Cardassian space station Terok Nor when the Cardassians withdrew from the station, leaving it to the Federation and Bajorans. The reasons for Garak's exile were never stated explicitly. In "The Wire", a delirious Garak gave three contradictory stories for his exile: first that he had killed some escaping Bajoran prisoners in the last days of the occupation but in the process also killed the daughter of a powerful Cardassian military official; then that he actually took pity on some Bajoran children and allowed them to escape; and finally that he had been framed by his best friend Elim, for letting Bajoran prisoners escape. The name he gives as his friend "Elim", is actually his own first name, which the others did not know while he was telling the story. In "Improbable Cause", Garak's former mentor Enabran Tain plainly accuses him of betraying Cardassia, but no details are given.

Garak's character is elaborated upon when his childhood abuse is revealed. Garak, whose father, Enabran Tain, was the head of the Obsidian Order, is seen to have an acute form of claustrophobia as an adult. His claustrophobia is strongly suggested to have resulted from his father locking him in a closet as punishment for him not doing his chores, often for hours at a time, possibly exacerbated by an incident as an adult where he may have been trapped in a collapsing building. In "Afterimage", Garak only overcomes an acute attack of this condition with the help of Ezri Dax who was newly posted to DS9 as the station's psychologist when she helps him understand and accept his feelings of guilt over his role in the current war, including decoding Cardassian messages for the Federation.

To gain his father's approval, Garak followed in his footsteps and joined the Obsidian Order; at one point, he was stationed on Romulus working as a gardener in the Cardassian embassy as his cover (and was likely involved in the deaths of several Romulan officials), until the Cardassians stationed him on occupied Bajor. In his role as an agent of the Obsidian Order, it is suggested that Garak was one of the most skilled operatives within the organization, with a particular talent for interrogation—both physical and psychological. Garak has shown ability in hand-to-hand combat, computer programming and repair, piloting and code breaking. These talents came to the forefront on many occasions and Captain Sisko made use of them by recruiting Garak to work with Federation personnel, especially during the Dominion War. In "A Time to Stand", Garak worked with a Starfleet detachment commanded by Captain Sisko during a mission to destroy a vital Jem'Hadar supply depot.

In the third season of Deep Space Nine, during the Romulan–Cardassian attempt to destroy the Founders' home world, Garak is given the opportunity to return home by proving himself to Tain as a trustworthy operative of the Obsidian Order. Garak is assigned to interrogate and torture Deep Space Nine's chief of security, Odo, whose people had founded the Dominion. Although reluctant, Garak agrees, to demonstrate his loyalty to Tain and to prevent anyone else from taking the assignment. During the interrogation, Garak is surprised to discover that he no longer has the stomach for cold-blooded torture and horrified with how far he takes it before Odo reveals his secret (which is ultimately irrelevant to their mission anyway). Garak returns to Deep Space Nine with Odo after apologizing to him and the two form a unique bond after realizing that they were more alike than they had originally thought, both longing to return home to their people but forced into exile. Later, during “In Purgatory's Shadow”, when Garak goes with Worf to the Gamma Quadrant to try to find surviving members of the failed attack on the Founders, a dying Tain admits before witnesses that he is Garak's father, including the depth of his feelings ("I should have killed your mother before you were born. You have always been a weakness I can't afford."), finally telling Garak that he is proud of him as his son.

In the final two seasons, Garak shifted his loyalties completely towards the Federation, primarily because his old political rival, Gul Dukat, seized control of Cardassia and aligned it with the Dominion. Garak uses his knowledge to assist the Federation in its war against the Dominion and Cardassia. With Sisko, Garak tricked the Romulans into entering the Dominion War on the Federation side by forging evidence of a high level Dominion meeting to plan the invasion of Romulus and then planting a bomb on the shuttle of a Romulan senator, when he concludes that the evidence was forged. Garak developed serious psychological trauma knowing that he had contributed to the deaths of his fellow Cardassians, a condition that Ezri Dax in her first case as Counsellor was able to treat to a manageable degree. Towards the end of the war Garak served as a Federation liaison to Legate Damar and his Cardassian rebellion against the Dominion, along with the Bajoran Kira Nerys. In retaliation for the rebellion, the Dominion killed 800 million Cardassians. As a result of the war, and the liberation of Cardassia from Dominion control, Garak's exile ends.

In Star Trek: Lower Decks season 5, an alternate reality version of Garak serves aboard the Defiant-class Anaximander as a surgeon. He has also married a Julian Bashir from a different alternate reality.

=== Post-TV series novels ===
In the novel A Stitch in Time (2000) (ISBN 0-671-03885-0), written by Andrew Robinson, Garak's life is further explored. The novel focuses on a letter from Garak to Bashir and shows that Garak has become involved in the political and social rebuilding of Cardassia. In the short story The Calling within the book Prophecy and Change (ISBN 0-7434-7073-7), his story continues.

In the Deep Space Nine novel The Never-Ending Sacrifice (2009), Garak is shown to have become Cardassian Ambassador to the United Federation of Planets. In the novel Mere Mortals, part of the Star Trek: Destiny trilogy, Garak is summoned to an emergency meeting by Federation President Nanietta Bacco. Bacco had called the unprecedented meeting because the Borg had launched an invasion of local space with the intention to completely wipe out all sentient threats. After some territorial concessions, Garak agreed to attempt to convince the Castellan (head of state) of the Cardassian Union to contribute ships to a massive allied response to the Borg.

In the novel The Crimson Shadow (2013), part of the Star Trek: The Fall miniseries, the Enterprise-E transports Ambassador Garak back home to Cardassia in order to oversee Starfleet's final withdrawal from Cardassian space. However, the expected mere formality in Federation-Cardassian relations attracted the attention of Cardassian terrorists who were involved in the assassination of Federation President Bacco. At the end of the novel, Garak decides to run for the office of Castellan, and goes on to win.

== Personality ==
Outwardly, Garak is gregarious and polite, traits that he uses to obscure people's knowledge, or suspicion, of his work as a spy. Despite his image of an optimistic and well-mannered being, he is widely known to be deceitful, even to those whom he considers to be "friends"; e.g., Doctor Julian Bashir. Garak is secretive, often creating elaborate stories about himself to avoid scrutiny about his exile. As his father Tain once said of him, one of Garak's basic philosophies is "Never tell the truth when a lie will do." He once explained his belief that "the truth is usually just an excuse for a lack of imagination." At one point, Doctor Bashir told him the story of "The Boy Who Cried Wolf" and upon hearing the moral ("no one believes a liar when he is telling the truth"), Garak insisted that the true moral was, "you should never tell the same lie twice".

In the episode "Favor the Bold", Bashir accuses him of being a pessimist and he defends himself by asserting: "I always hope for the best. Experience, unfortunately, has taught me to expect the worst." On several occasions, when an otherwise trusting or idealistic character expresses a lack of trust in him, he reacts positively, remarking "there may be hope for you yet".

Garak on numerous occasions is seen to have internal conflicts between his morals and his obligations to the Cardassian central command. Despite substantial evidence to suggest that he was an operative of the Obsidian Order, Garak on several occasions denies having ever been involved with the group, claiming he is just "plain, simple Garak, a tailor on the Promenade" and that his difficulties with the Cardassian government stem from tax evasion. He repeats this story frequently, even to people that he knows are aware of (some of) the truth about his past, and even those who are unaware of Garak's past find the assertion to be dubious, at best.

== Mirror universe ==
In the mirror universe Garak is a vicious and sadistic Gul in the Cardassian military. He was Intendant Kira's second-in-command and resented her authority. Worf's mirror universe counterpart personally blamed Garak for losing the Terok Nor station to a Terran (human) slave rebellion, although Garak blamed Kira and attempted to manipulate Worf into trying to get revenge on her.

Robinson reportedly disliked portraying this version of Garak, as he lacked any of his counterpart's depth or complexity, instead serving as a mere treacherous minion. This quality was noted in his last appearance when Quark, Rom and Zek travelled to the Mirror Universe, Quark and Rom criticizing Mirror-Garak's plans to simply kill them by talking about the elaborate lengths that their Garak would go to, resulting in Mirror-Garak being killed by the Mirror version of Ezri Tigan while he was distracted.

== Appearances ==
Garak appeared in the following Star Trek: Deep Space Nine episodes:

- "Past Prologue"
- "Cardassians"
- "Profit and Loss"
- "The Wire"
- "Crossover"
- "The Search: Part 2"
- "Second Skin"
- "Civil Defense"
- "Distant Voices"
- "Through the Looking Glass"
- "Improbable Cause"
- "The Die Is Cast"
- "The Way of the Warrior"
- "Our Man Bashir"
- "Shattered Mirror"
- "For the Cause"
- "Body Parts"
- "Broken Link"
- "Things Past"
- "In Purgatory's Shadow"
- "By Inferno's Light"
- "Empok Nor"
- "Call to Arms"
- "A Time to Stand"
- "Rocks and Shoals"
- "Favor the Bold"
- "Sacrifice of Angels"
- "In the Pale Moonlight"
- "Tears of the Prophets"
- "Afterimage"
- "The Emperor's New Cloak"
- "Inter Arma Enim Silent Leges"
- "When It Rains…"
- "Tacking Into the Wind"
- "Extreme Measures"
- "The Dogs of War"
- "What You Leave Behind"

A version of Garak from a parallel universe appeared in the fifth season and penultimate episode of Star Trek: Lower Decks, "Fissure Quest".

== Reception ==
In 2009, IGN ranked Garak as the 14th best character of Star Trek overall.

In 2017, Screen Rant ranked Garak the 14th best character of all Star Trek. They note that the character is beloved by fans, although seems to have a morally grey quality that feeds a level of mystery about the apparently exiled Cardassian. They note that the actor that played Garak wrote A Stitch In Time, and recommended it for aficionados of this Star Trek: Deep Space Nine character.

In 2018, CBR ranked Garak the second best recurring character of all Star Trek.

In 2020, Screen Rant ranked Garak one of the top five most likeable characters on the show.
