= By Inferno's Light =

- Star Trek: Deep Space Nine episode
- Episode no.: Season 5 Episode 15
- Directed by: Les Landau
- Written by: Ira Steven Behr; Robert Hewitt Wolfe
- Production code: 513
- Original air date: February 17, 1997

Guest appearances
- Andrew J. Robinson as Garak; Marc Alaimo as Dukat; Melanie Smith as Ziyal; J. G. Hertzler as Martok; James Horan as Ikat'ika; Robert O'Reilly as Gowron; Carrie Stauber as Romulan

Episode chronology
← Previous "In Purgatory's Shadow"	Next → "Doctor Bashir, I Presume?"
- Star Trek: Deep Space Nine season 5

"By Inferno's Light" is the 113th episode of the television series Star Trek: Deep Space Nine, the 15th episode of the fifth season.

Set in the 24th century, the series follows the adventures of the crew of the Starfleet-run space station Deep Space Nine near the planet Bajor, guarding a wormhole that connects the Alpha and Gamma Quadrants of the galaxy, as the Bajorans recover from a decades-long occupation by the imperialistic Cardassians. The Gamma Quadrant is home to a hostile empire known as the Dominion, ruled by the shape-shifting Changelings, whose will is enforced by their ruthless soldiers, the Jem'Hadar, and their administrators, the Vorta. In the middle seasons of the series, the Dominion foments discord between the Cardassians, the Klingon Empire, and the United Federation of Planets.

This episode is the second half of a two-part episode. In its predecessor, "In Purgatory's Shadow", the Dominion prepared to launch its long-awaited invasion of the Alpha Quadrant, as several Deep Space Nine officers and allies were held prisoner in a Dominion detainment facility. This episode sees Cardassia join the Dominion, drastically altering the balance of power in the galaxy. It features the return of several recurring characters and draws on plot lines from the third-season's "Improbable Cause" and "The Die is Cast", the body of the fourth season, and fifth-season opener "Apocalypse Rising".

The episode premiered to almost 6 million viewers.

It is the final episode of the series where any of the main DS9 cast is wearing the original DS9-style uniforms. In this case, the real Dr. Julian Bashir.

== Plot ==
The Dominion fleet passes through the wormhole and the DS9 crew anticipates an immediate attack, but the fleet instead flies off toward Cardassia. The Cardassian officer Gul Dukat joins them, announcing that the Dominion has accepted Cardassia as a member, with Dukat as its new leader. Thanks to sabotage by a Changeling resembling Dr. Bashir, the wormhole can now never be collapsed.

At the Dominion internment camp where DS9 officers Worf and Dr. Bashir, the Cardassian former spy Garak, and the Klingon general Martok are being held, the inmates have built an illicit transmitter inside the prison walls. Garak crawls inside the walls to modify it to signal their runabout so they can escape, triggering his severe claustrophobia. Meanwhile, Worf is selected as an opponent for Jem'Hadar guards to practice hand-to-hand combat. Worf's refusal to surrender, defeating a series of Jem'Hadar opponents, inspires Garak to overcome his fears and continue working.

Dukat vows that, with the help of the Dominion, within five days he will remove and kill all Klingons and Maquis from within Cardassian space, and also destroy all who stand in the way of Cardassia becoming a major power in the Alpha Quadrant. Consequently the war between the Klingons and the Cardassians suddenly turns against the Klingons, and they quickly halt their invasion of Cardassian space. When their battered fleet arrives at Deep Space Nine, Captain Sisko persuades Klingon chancellor Gowron to reinstate the alliance between the Klingons and the Federation in order to fight the Dominion. Dukat contacts Sisko, warning that he intends to conquer Deep Space Nine for the Dominion and offering him a chance to surrender; Sisko naturally refuses. Sisko deploys the starship Defiant and three runabouts to fight the incoming Cardassian/Dominion fleet; they are joined by the Klingons and a Romulan fleet. Unknown to Sisko, the Bashir Changeling has killed the crew of one of the runabouts and is now in command.

Back at the internment camp, the Jem'Hadar come close to discovering Garak before being overpowered by the other prisoners. Meanwhile, Worf is fighting Ikat'ika, the Jem'Hadar commander. Worf refuses to yield; Ikat'ika, impressed by Worf's determination, yields the fight. The Vorta overseer, disgusted, orders Worf's and Ikat'ika's immediate execution. As the troops turn their phasers toward Worf, Garak manages to activate the transmitter, and the prisoners are beamed away to the runabout at the last second. There, Bashir sends an urgent message to DS9.

The Changeling Bashir's runabout is carrying a bomb intended to detonate inside the Bajoran sun, causing a supernova that will incinerate DS9, Bajor, and the combined Starfleet, Klingon, and Romulan forces. Receiving Bashir's message, Sisko orders that runabout destroyed. The Defiant takes the risky maneuver of engaging warp drive within the planetary system in order to pull the runabout away from the star where it explodes safely. The Cardassian/Dominion fleet never arrive, with Sisko realizing the threat of attack was meant to lure the combined fleets to Deep Space Nine so the supernova would wipe them all out in one go.

Garak, Worf, Bashir, and Martok return to the station and Sisko finalizes the peace treaty with Gowron. Martok is appointed to command the new permanent Klingon presence on DS9. Dukat contacts Sisko to congratulate him on his victory, but promises things will be different next time.

== Reception ==
In 2018, CBR rated "In Purgatory's Shadow" paired with "By Inferno's Light", as the 9th best multi episode story arc of all Star Trek.

In 2015, Geek.com recommended this episode as "essential watching" for their abbreviated Star Trek: Deep Space Nine binge-watching guide.

In 2020, The Digital Fix ranked "In Purgatory's Shadow" and "By Inferno's Light" as the fourth best episode(s) of Deep Space Nine. They call the episodes an "epic two-parter" that took the show's "long-running narrative to another level" and praised the various plot lines and reveals.
