= Behind the Lines (Star Trek: Deep Space Nine) =

- Star Trek: Deep Space Nine episode
- Episode no.: Season 6 Episode 4
- Directed by: LeVar Burton
- Written by: René Echevarria
- Production code: 528
- Original air date: October 20, 1997

Guest appearances
- Jeffrey Combs as Weyoun; Marc Alaimo as Dukat; Max Grodénchik as Rom; Aron Eisenberg as Nog; Casey Biggs as Damar; Barry Jenner as Admiral Ross; Salome Jens as Female Changeling

Episode chronology
← Previous "Sons and Daughters"	Next → "Favor the Bold"
- Star Trek: Deep Space Nine season 6

"Behind the Lines" is the fourth episode of the sixth season of Star Trek: Deep Space Nine, the 128th episode in the science fiction show.

The episode was written by Rene Echevarria and directed by actor-director LeVar Burton. It was broadcast on television on October 20, 1997.

The series, set in the 24th century, follows the adventures of the crew of the space station Deep Space Nine near the planet Bajor, guarding a wormhole connecting Bajor to the distant Gamma Quadrant of the galaxy; the Gamma Quadrant is home to an aggressive empire known as the Dominion, ruled by the shapeshifting Changelings. The episode is set during the early months of the series's Dominion War storyline after the Dominion has absorbed the nearby planet of Cardassia and gone to war against the United Federation of Planets. This episode is the fourth in a six-episode story arc, during which Deep Space Nine is occupied by the Dominion–Cardassian alliance under a non-aggression pact with Bajor. The station's usual Starfleet crew and their starship, the Defiant, having fled the station in the previous season finale, are pursuing the war in other venues.

This had a Nielsen rating of 5.1 points, about five million viewers when it premiered.

== Plot ==
Returning from another mission against the Dominion on the Defiant, Captain Sisko is informed that Starfleet Intelligence has discovered a massive sensor array that the Dominion uses to track Starfleet ship movement. Sisko determines that the only way to destroy the array is to approach it through a star cluster. However, Sisko has been promoted to adjutant to Admiral Ross and will not be commanding the mission. Commander Dax is placed in command of the Defiant. While Sisko misses his crew and frets over their safe return, Dax leads the mission and destroys the array.

Meanwhile, Major Kira and the others on occupied Deep Space Nine are successful in spreading distrust between the Cardassians and Dominion by allowing the Dominion's Jem'Hadar soldiers to find out about Cardassian officer Damar's proposal to poison the Jem'Hadar if supplies run out of the drug needed to control them. Meanwhile, the Cardassian leader Dukat has not yet been able to destroy the Starfleet minefield preventing Dominion reinforcements from arriving from the Gamma Quadrant.

One of the Changelings, the shapeshifting rulers of the Dominion, visits DS9, hoping to spend time with Odo, a rogue Changeling who has lived among and allied with the Bajorans. She persuades Odo to "link" with her, physically joining their liquid bodies so he can understand more about his people.

While drinking at Quark's bar, Damar reveals that he has found a way to destroy the minefield by firing a beam from the station's deflector array. Quark relays this information to Kira, and she and Rom plan to sabotage the deflector. Odo offers to disable the security system so that Rom's interference goes undetected. However, when the moment comes, Odo is in the middle of linking with the other Changeling, so when Rom begins his work, he sets off the security alarm and is captured by Damar. Kira confronts Odo, but he merely says that while linked, nothing else matters.

== Reception ==
Keith DeCandido of Tor.com gave the episode seven out of ten.

In 2015, Geek.com recommended this episode as "essential watching" for their abbreviated Star Trek: Deep Space Nine binge-watching guide. Also, in 2015, a binge-watching guide for Star Trek: Deep Space Nine by Wired recommended not skipping this essential episode.

In 2018, SyFy recommend this episode for its abbreviated watch guide for the Bajoran character Kira Nerys. They recommended it as part of a sequence of seven episodes, including "Call to Arms," "A Time to Stand," "Rocks and Shoals," "Sons and Daughters," "Behind the Lines," "Favor the Bold," and "Sacrifice of Angels"; this includes from the season finale of Season 5 and the first six episodes of Season 6 of the show.
