= Rocks and Shoals (Star Trek: Deep Space Nine) =

- Star Trek: Deep Space Nine episode
- Episode no.: Season 6 Episode 2
- Directed by: Mike Vejar
- Written by: Ronald D. Moore
- Cinematography by: Jonathan West
- Production code: 527
- Original air date: October 6, 1997

Guest appearances
- Andrew J. Robinson as Elim Garak; Phil Morris as Third Remata'Klan; Christopher Shea as Keevan; Aron Eisenberg as Nog; Paul Eckstein as Limara'Son; Lilyan Chauvin as Vedek Yassim; Sarah MacDonnell as Lt. Neeley; Joseph Fuqua as Ensign Paul Gordon

Episode chronology
← Previous "A Time to Stand"	Next → "Sons and Daughters"
- Star Trek: Deep Space Nine season 6

"Rocks and Shoals" is the 126th episode of the syndicated American science fiction television series Star Trek: Deep Space Nine, the second episode of the sixth season's opening six-episode story arc, beginning shortly after the events of the previous episode.

Set in the 24th century, the series follows the adventures of the crew of the Starfleet-managed Bajoran space station Deep Space Nine. During the opening story arc of the sixth season, the hostile Dominion is in control of the station, and its usual Starfleet crew are fighting the Dominion War in other venues.

The episode's storyline was inspired by Frank Sinatra's 1965 anti-war film None but the Brave.

== Plot ==
The ship commanded by Captain Sisko crash-lands in a sea on a barren planet, injuring Lieutenant Commander Dax. A crew of Jem'Hadar, the Dominion's genetically engineered soldiers, and their severely injured Vorta supervisor, Keevan, have also recently crashed on the planet. Keevan strictly rations the limited supply of Ketracel White, the drug that the Jem'Hadar need to survive. The Jem'Hadar capture two members of Sisko's crew, Nog and Garak, and learn from them that the Starfleet crew includes a doctor.

The Jem'Hadar commander Remata'Klan delivers a message to Sisko: Keevan will free Garak and Nog in exchange for treatment from Dr. Bashir and a conversation with Sisko. Sisko takes the opportunity to try to drive a wedge between Remata'Klan and Keevan, but Remata'Klan remains loyal.

Bashir successfully treats Keevan's wound. Keevan shows Sisko that he has a broken transmitter that could be used to send a distress call, but not enough Ketracel White to sustain the soldiers until it is repaired; once the supply is gone, the Jem'Hadar will go on a killing rampage. Keevan says he will order the Jem'Hadar to attack the Starfleet crew, but he will give Sisko their attack plan, allowing Sisko's crew to kill the Jem'Hadar easily; he will then surrender himself and the transmitter. Sisko accepts the offer, over the objections of some of his crew.

Sisko's crew establish a lethal crossfire along the Jem'Hadar's approach to their camp. Before the battle begins, Sisko meets with Remata'Klan, and tells him of Keevan's betrayal, arguing that Keevan does not deserve the Jem'Hadar's loyalty. Remata'Klan confesses that he suspected Keevan was deliberately leading them into a trap, but the Jem'Hadar's loyalty to the Vorta is part of the order of things; he will follow Keevan's orders, even though none of his men will survive. When the Jem'Hadar attack, they are quickly mowed down by the Starfleet crew. As Keevan surrenders, a disgusted Sisko orders a burial detail for the dead.

Meanwhile, on Deep Space Nine, the Bajoran Major Kira gradually comes to realize that by not fighting the Dominion occupation, she has become a collaborator; she identifies uncomfortable parallels between her own passivity and those who collaborated with the Cardassians during their brutal occupation of Bajor. A Bajoran priest, Vedek Yassim, hangs herself in protest, declaring "Evil must be opposed." The next morning Kira confides to her friend Odo that she is going to start actively resisting the Dominion.

== Reception ==
The episode helped advance the character of Major Kira Nerys. According to actress Nana Visitor: "Kira's maturity had to kick in, because she couldn't just react the way the younger Kira would. There was too much at stake. There was too much to lose. So even though it wasn't as much fun to play, I found it was an important growth point." Io9's 2014 listing of the top 100 Star Trek episodes placed "Rocks and Shoals" as the 41st best episode of all series up to that time, out of over 700 episodes.

A 2015 binge-watching guide for Star Trek: Deep Space Nine by Wired recommended not skipping this essential episode.

In 2016,The Hollywood Reporter rated "Rocks and Shoals" along with six connecting episodes as among the twenty greatest episodes (or sequences of episodes) in Star Trek: Deep Space Nine. This six-episode arc is noted for its serialized format, compared to shorter two-episode pair stories that had been more common to the Star Trek franchise up to that time.

The six-episode arc:

- "A Time to Stand" (Season 6 Episode 1)
- "Rocks and Shoals"
- "Sons and Daughters"
- "Behind the Lines"
- "Favor the Bold"
- "Sacrifice of Angels"

In 2018, SyFy recommend this episode for its abbreviated watch guide for the Bajoran character Kira Nerys. They recommend it as sequence of seven episodes including a "Call to Arms," "A Time to Stand," "Rocks and Shoals," "Sons and Daughters," "Behind the Lines," "Favor the Bold" and "Sacrifice of Angels"; this includes from the season finale of Season 5 and the first six episodes of Season 6 of the show.
