= Sons and Daughters (Star Trek: Deep Space Nine) =

- Star Trek: Deep Space Nine episode
- Episode no.: Season 6 Episode 3
- Directed by: Jesús Salvador Treviño
- Written by: Bradley Thompson; David Weddle
- Production code: 526
- Original air date: October 13, 1997

Guest appearances
- Marc Worden as Alexander Rozhenko; Marc Alaimo as Gul Dukat; J. G. Hertzler as General Martok; Melanie Smith as Tora Ziyal; Casey Biggs as Damar; Sam Zeller as Ch'Targh; Gabrielle Union as N'Garen

Episode chronology
← Previous "Rocks and Shoals"	Next → "Behind the Lines"
- Star Trek: Deep Space Nine season 6

"Sons and Daughters" is the third episode in the sixth season of Star Trek: Deep Space Nine. It is the 127th episode overall.

Set in the 24th century, the series follows the adventures of the crew of the Starfleet-run space station Deep Space Nine near the planet Bajor, as the Bajorans recover from a long, brutal occupation by the imperialistic Cardassians. Several episodes focus on the Klingons, a race distinguished by their honor-based warrior ideology. In the story arc that begins the sixth season of the series, Deep Space Nine has been captured by the hostile empire known as the Dominion, which has allied itself with the Cardassians, while the station's usual Starfleet crew fights the Dominion War in other venues.

In this episode, the Klingon officer Worf must learn how to relate to his estranged son Alexander Rozhenko when the latter enlists in the Klingon military; meanwhile, Tora Ziyal, the half-Bajoran daughter of Cardassian leader Gul Dukat, is caught between her love for her father and her friendship with Bajoran officer Kira Nerys.

The episode features a performance by Gabrielle Union in a minor role as one of Alexander's Klingon crewmates, some years before she became famous for her role in the film Bring It On.

== Plot ==
Captain Benjamin Sisko and his crew have been rescued from the planet upon which they were marooned in the previous episode, by the Klingon general Martok's ship, the Rotarran, on which Worf is first officer. After dropping off Sisko's crew, the Rotarran picks up some new recruits, including Worf's estranged son Alexander, who has joined the Klingon Defense Force without his father's knowledge.

Worf and Alexander argue about Alexander's motivation for joining the military. Worf tells Alexander that he had accepted that his son does not have the heart of a warrior, and he is now confused by Alexander's determination to fight. Later, another member of the crew taunts Alexander about having been raised by humans, and a fight breaks out. Worf breaks up the combat, afraid that Alexander will be injured or killed; Alexander resents Worf's interference, and Martok reprimands him for it. Later, Alexander humiliates himself further when he mistakes a simulation program for an attack on the ship.

Worf attempts to train his son in combat, but the training session quickly breaks down into an argument. Alexander asks if his father plans to send him away yet again, and says that Worf will be glad when he is dead. In an attempt to quash the tension between Worf and Alexander, Martok reassigns Alexander to a transport ship, which provokes another confrontation. This is interrupted by an attack on the Rotarran by Dominion ships.

Alexander distinguishes himself in the ensuing battle by stopping a plasma leak, though he somehow gets himself locked in a room and needs to be rescued. Worf gains a new respect for his son, as well as an understanding that Alexander must choose his own path, and says that he will try to be a better father. The episode ends with Alexander joining the House of Martok, as Worf had done.

Meanwhile, on Deep Space Nine, Dukat brings his daughter Ziyal on board, hoping to use Kira's affection for Ziyal to bring her closer to him. When Ziyal's art is accepted into a prestigious exhibition, Dukat invites Kira to a party to celebrate, sending her a beautiful dress as a gift. Kira is briefly tempted by Dukat's offer, but finds that she cannot face herself in the dress and angrily returns it to him. Ziyal asks Kira not to make her choose between her and Dukat, but Kira tells her there is no choice; Dukat is her father.

== Reception ==
Keith R.A. DeCandido, reviewing the episode in 2014 for Tor.com, gave it a rating of five out of ten. He disliked the portion of the episode focusing on Alexander, describing Marc Worden's performance as wooden and the storyline as a "waste of time", but praised the Ziyal storyline and Marc Alaimo's performance as Dukat. Zack Handlen, writing for The A.V. Club in 2013, liked the episode more; he found Worden's performance appropriate for the character and described the narrative as "reasonable, but imperfect", and appreciated the Ziyal storyline for illustrating "the seductiveness of evil".

A 2015 binge-watching guide for Star Trek: Deep Space Nine by Wired recommended not skipping this essential episode.

In 2018, SyFy recommend this episode for its abbreviated watch guide for episodes featuring the character Kira Nerys. They recommend it as part of sequence of seven episodes including a "Call to Arms," "A Time to Stand," "Rocks and Shoals," "Sons and Daughters," "Behind the Lines," "Favor the Bold" and "Sacrifice of Angels"; this includes the finale of Season 5 and the first six episodes of Season 6.
