= Barry Jenner =

American actor (1941–2016)

- Born: Barry Francis Jenner; January 14, 1941; Philadelphia, Pennsylvania, U.S.
- Died: August 9, 2016 (aged 75); Los Angeles, California, U.S.
- Education: West Chester University
- Occupations: Police officer; Actor
- Years active: 1974–2016
- Known for: Dr. Jerry Kenderson (Dallas); Admiral William Ross (Star Trek: Deep Space Nine)
- Spouses: Susan Harney (m. 1980; div. 1990); Suzanne Hunt (m. 2001)
- Children: 2

Barry Francis Jenner (January 14, 1941 – August 9, 2016) was an American actor, known for his roles as Dr. Jerry Kenderson in Dallas and as Admiral William Ross in Star Trek: Deep Space Nine.

== Early life ==
Jenner was born January 14, 1941, in Philadelphia, Pennsylvania. He began acting during his college years at West Chester University, in Pennsylvania. After graduation, Jenner moved to New York City where he found roles in Club Champion’s Widow, opposite Maureen Stapleton, and Put Them All Together with Mariette Hartley. Along with Olympia Dukakis, he was a founding member of the innovative Whole Theatre Company where he starred opposite Dukakis in Long Day’s Journey Into Night. Jenner also received wide acclaim as the self-destructive pitcher in Jonathan Reynolds' hit play, Yanks 3, Detroit 0, Top of the Seventh, directed by Alan Arkin at New York City’s American Place Theatre.

== Career ==
Jenner served as a Los Angeles Police Department reserve officer for 21 years. He had early roles on two daytime programs, as Tony Cooper on Somerset (1974–76) and as Evan Webster on Another World (1976–77), where he was involved with Olive Gordon (Jennifer Leak) in an infamous storyline plot to kill long-time character John Randolph (Michael M. Ryan). In 1981, Jenner appeared in several episodes of Knots Landing as Jeff Cunningham, the ex-husband of Abby Cunningham (Donna Mills). He later had a recurring role as Dr. Jerry Kenderson on Dallas (1984–1986). Also in the 1980s, Jenner was a frequent celebrity guest on the $100,000 Pyramid game show appearing from 1986-1991. He is the only celebrity to assist in winning the $100,000 on both the Dick Clark and John Davidson incarnations of the game show. Besides that, Jenner appeared on Super Password with Lindsay Bloom, Abby Dalton and Bert Convy in 1986.

Jenner made guest appearances in other series such as Good Morning, Miss Bliss, Barnaby Jones, Highway to Heaven, Falcon Crest, Hart to Hart, Matlock, V, Silk Stalkings, and Walker, Texas Ranger. Jenner was best known for his recurring role as Carl Winslow's boss Lt. Lou Murtaugh on Family Matters from 1990 to 1992. Jenner had a recurring role on Star Trek: Deep Space Nine as Admiral William Ross, appearing in twelve episodes of the series. From 1996 to 1998, he co-starred in the short-lived sitcom Something So Right. Jenner lent his voice to the video game Star Trek: Deep Space Nine: Dominion Wars. He was a popular figure on the convention circuit.

In a 1999 episode of the animated television series King of the Hill, Jenner is awarded a plot in the Texas State Cemetery for his appearances on Dallas.

== Personal life and death ==
Jenner married Susan Harney on May 23, 1980 and later divorced. Jenner married actress Suzanne Hunt on April 1, 2001. They appeared together in the film Popcorn in 1991 and were together for more than 25 years. Barry and Suzanne had two sons, Ashley and Christian. In films, Jenner played the role of Lieutenant James Bradley in the sci-fi spoof, Popcorn, starring opposite his actress wife, Suzanne. He died on August 9, 2016, at Cedars-Sinai Medical Center in Los Angeles from acute myeloid leukemia at the age of 75.

== Filmography ==
=== Film ===
Year	Title	Role	Notes	Ref.
1981	Looker	Commercial Producer	Science fiction film written and directed by Michael Crichton	
1988	The Boost	Billy	Drama film directed by Harold Becker	
1991	Popcorn	Lt. Bradley	Comedy horror film directed by Mark Herrier	
2013	Enough Said	Crying Guy	Romantic comedy-drama film written & directed by Nicole Holofcener	
2013	Defending Santa	Harry	Drama–fantasy family film directed by Brian Skiba	
2013	Time Capsule	Jason	Short comedy-drama film written & directed by Vivian Chen.	
2014	Blue Jay	Marty	Short drama–family film written & directed by Robert Burdsall.	
2016	The Caretaker	Rawdilly	Horror–thriller film directed by Jeff Prugh	

=== Television ===
Year	Title	Role	Notes	Ref.
1974–76	Somerset	Tony Cooper #3	Contract role	
1976–77	Another World	Evan Webster	Contract role	
1979	Barnaby Jones	Alan Rogers	Episode: "The Protectors" (S 7:Ep 18)	
1980	Hart to Hart	Warren Keller	Episode: "Color Jennifer Dead" (S 1:Ep 12)	
1981	Fly Away Home	Sgt. Downs	Made-for-TV-Movie directed by Paul Krasny	
1981	Knots Landing	Jeff Cunningham	Recurring	
1983	Hotel	Kramer	Episode: "Charades" (S 1:Ep 3)	
1984	Remington Steele	Edward Lawton / Eddie Lucas	Episode: "Elementary Steele" (S 2:Ep 21)	
1984	V	Visitor Bridge Technician	Episode: "Dreadnaught" (S 1:Ep 2)	
1984–86	Dallas	Dr. Jerry Kenderson	Recurring	
1985	Days of Our Lives	Matt MacKenzie	Episode: "February 19, 1985" (S 19:Ep 31)	
1985	Fame	Jim Laird	Episode: "Reflections" (S 4:Ep 22)	
1985	Simon & Simon	Warden Latham	Episode: "Reunion at Alcatraz" (S 5:Ep 7)	
1985	Highway to Heaven	Wes Fowler	Episode: "The Secret" (S 2:Ep 9)	
1986–91	The $100,000 Pyramid	Himself	25 episodes	
1986	If Tomorrow Comes	Zeller	Made-for-TV-Movie directed by Jerry London; Bbased on the novel of the same name	
1986	Celebrity Double Talk	Himself	Episodes: (S 1:Eps 6–10 & 71–75)	
1986	Matlock	Mark Harris	Episode: "Santa Claus" (S 1:Ep 12)	
1986	Super Password	Himself	Episodes: (S 2:Eps 153–157 & 217–221)	
1986–88	The $25,000 Pyramid	Himself	25 episodes	
1987	1st & Ten	Dave	Episode: "Land of the Free" (S 4:Ep 11)	
1987	Starman	Tom Kendall	Episode: "Fathers and Sons" (S 1:Ep 19)	
1987	St. Elsewhere	Dr. Larry Sanders	Episode: "The He-Man Woman Hater's Club" (S 6:Ep 6)	
1987	Hotel	Richard Larson	Episode: "Fallen Angel" (S 5:Ep 9)	
1988	Hunter	Lt. Larson	Episodes: "Naked Justice: Part 1" (S 4:Ep 14); "Naked Justice: Part 2" (S 4:Ep 15)	
1988	Duet	Senator Jim Grath	Episode: "The Candidate" (S 2:Ep 16)	
1988	The Taking of Flight 847: The Uli Derickson Story	Ben Zimmerman	Made-for-TV-Movie directed by Paul Wendkos	
1988	Family Ties	David Campbell	Episode: "Designing Woman" (S 7:Ep 2)	
1988	Good Morning, Miss Bliss	Brian	Episode: "Summer Love" (S 1:Ep 1–Pilot)	
1989	Falcon Crest	Prosecuting Attorney Loomis	Episodes: "Ties That Bind" (S 8:Ep 20); "The Last Laugh" (S 8:Ep 21)	
1989	Mr. Belvedere	Man #2	Episode: "Fear of Flying" (S 6:Ep 5)	
1989	Matlock	Donald March	Episode: "The Ex" (S 4:Ep 5)	
1990	Guns of Paradise	Judge Melbourne	Episode: "Till Death Do Us Part" (S 2:Ep 15)	
1990–92	Family Matters	Lou Murtaugh	Recurring	
1991	The Hogan Family	Dr. Gary McCall	Episode: "Isn't It Romantic?" (S 6:Ep 12)	
1993	Silk Stalkings	Bert	Episode: "Giant Steps" (S 2:Ep 20)	
1994	Walker, Texas Ranger	Frank Swain	Episode: "Silk Dreams" (S 3:Ep 3)	
1994	Aaahh!!! Real Monsters	Traveler	Episode: "Monster Make-Over/Airplane, a Wing and a Scare" (S 1:Ep 4)	
1994	Silk Stalkings	Rob	Episode: "Time Share" (S 4:Ep 11)	
1996–98	Something So Right	Sheldon Kramer	Contract role	
1996	JAG	Captain Evans	Episode: "Ares" (S 1:Ep 21)	
1997	Mike Hammer, Private Eye	Johnny Palmieri	Episode: "False Truths" (S 1:Ep 5)	
1997–99	Star Trek: Deep Space Nine	Admiral William Ross	Recurring	
1998	JAG	Norman Delaporte	Episode: "Mr. Rabb Goes to Washington" (S 4:Ep 8)	
2015	Thrillzone	John Cutler	Episode: "Scissors Paper Stone" (S 1:Ep 11)	

==== Deep Space Nine appearances ====
Year	Season	Episode No.	Title	Role	Notes
1997	6	1	"A Time to Stand"	Admiral Ross	Directed by Allan Kroeker and written by Ira Steven Behr & Hans Beimler.
1997	6	4	"Behind the Lines"	Admiral Ross	Directed by LeVar Burton and written by René Echevarria.
1997	6	5	"Favor the Bold"	Admiral Ross	Directed by Winrich Kolbe and written by Ira Steven Behr & Hans Beimler.
1998	6	26	"Tears of the Prophets"	Admiral Ross	Directed by Allan Kroeker and written by Ira Steven Behr & Hans Beimler.
1998	7	1	"Image in the Sand"	Admiral Ross	Directed by Les Landau and written by Ira Steven Behr & Hans Beimler.
1998	7	2	"Shadows and Symbols"	Admiral Ross	Directed by Allan Kroeker and written by Ira Steven Behr & Hans Beimler.
1999	7	16	"Inter Arma Enim Silent Leges"	Admiral Ross	Directed by David Livingston and written by Ronald D. Moore.
1999	7	18	"Til Death Do Us Part"	Admiral Ross	Directed by Winrich Kolbe and written by David Weddle & Bradley Thompson.
1999	7	20	"The Changing Face of Evil"	Admiral Ross	Directed by Mike Vejar and written by Ira Steven Behr & Hans Beimler.
1999	7	21	"When It Rains…"	Admiral Ross	Directed by Michael Dorn, teleplay by René Echevarria, and story by René Echevarria & Spike Steingasser.
1999	7	24	"The Dogs of War"	Admiral Ross	Directed by Avery Brooks, teleplay by René Echevarria & Ronald D. Moore, and story by Peter Allan Fields.
1999	7	25 & 26	"What You Leave Behind"	Admiral Ross	Directed by Allan Kroeker and written by Ira Steven Behr & Hans Beimler.

=== Video games ===
Year	Title	Role	Notes	Ref.
1994	Undersea Adventure	Voice	An educational software program developed by Knowledge Adventure for Microsoft Windows developed by Knowledge Adventure and published by IBM	
2001	Star Trek: Deep Space Nine: Dominion Wars	Voice of Admiral Ross	Space combat/real-time tactics video game for Microsoft Windows developed by Gizmo Games and published by Simon & Schuster & based on Star Trek: Deep Space Nine.	

=== Videos ===
Year	Title	Role	Notes	Ref.
2001	Air Rage	Pilot	Action–adventure video directed by Ed Raymond.	
