= USS Centaur =

USS Centaur may refer to:

- USS Centaur, a United States Navy monitor in commission at various times between 1864 and 1877, known both before 15 June 1869 and after 10 August 1869 as USS Saugus (1863)
- USS Centaur, a fictional spacecraft in the "A Time to Stand" episode of the television show Star Trek: Deep Space Nine
