= Sacrifice of Angels =

- Star Trek: Deep Space Nine episode
- Episode no.: Season 6 Episode 6
- Directed by: Allan Kroeker
- Written by: Ira Steven Behr; Hans Beimler
- Production code: 530
- Original air date: November 3, 1997

Guest appearances
- Andrew J. Robinson as Garak; Jeffrey Combs as Weyoun; Marc Alaimo as Dukat; Max Grodénchik as Rom; J. G. Hertzler as Martok; Melanie Smith as Tora Ziyal; Casey Biggs as Damar; Chase Masterson as Leeta; Salome Jens as Female Changeling

Episode chronology
| ← Previous "Favor the Bold" | Next → "You Are Cordially Invited" |
- Star Trek: Deep Space Nine season 6

"Sacrifice of Angels" is the sixth episode from the sixth season of Star Trek: Deep Space Nine, 130th episode overall. The episode's plot details the efforts of the United Federation of Planets to retake space station Deep Space Nine from the forces of the Dominion. This is the second half of a two-part episode, continuing the story immediately from the end of the previous episode, "Favor the Bold". The episode features a large guest cast and numerous VFX scenes with spacecraft.

== Story background ==
Deep Space Nine tells the story of a space station near the planet Bajor administered by the United Federation of Planets as the Bajorans recover from a brutal decades-long occupation by the aggressive Cardassians. The station guards a wormhole leading to the distant Gamma Quadrant, home of an expansionist empire known as the Dominion, which is ruled by the shapeshifting Changelings. This episode is part of the Dominion War plot arc, in which the Dominion allies with Cardassia and wages war against the Federation and their allies.

This episode is the conclusion of a six-episode story that spans the start of the sixth season. At the end of the previous season, the Dominion captured the titular space station, but the Federation blocked the wormhole with a minefield to prevent reinforcements from arriving from the Gamma Quadrant. Over the following episodes, DS9's Starfleet crew, led by Captain Benjamin Sisko, continue the war against the Dominion on the starship USS Defiant; the main characters remaining on the station, led by Major Kira Nerys, work to undermine Dominion rule; Dominion representative Weyoun and Cardassian leader Dukat attempt to dismantle the minefield; and DS9 security chief Odo, a rogue Changeling, receives a visit from another Changeling hoping to persuade him to return to his people. By this point, the technician Rom has been arrested by the Dominion authorities for attempting to prevent destruction of the minefield; and Sisko is leading a Federation fleet aimed at retaking DS9 for the Federation before the minefield comes down.

== Plot ==
With eight hours before the minefield is destroyed, Sisko's fleet engages the Dominion fleet defending DS9. Sisko orders Federation fighters to engage the Cardassian warships, hoping the less disciplined Cardassians will break formation and create a hole in the Dominion lines. Aboard DS9, Dukat sees through Sisko's ruse; he deliberately allows some of his ships to open a hole in the formation to set a trap for the Federation fleet. Surmising that Dukat is setting a trap, Sisko nonetheless orders his ships forward, desperate to reach the station.

Meanwhile, Dukat's aide Damar arrests Kira, Sisko's son Jake, and Rom's wife Leeta, correctly surmising they are part of a conspiracy against Dominion rule. The visiting Changeling, attempting to break Odo's bond with the "solids" and return him to his own people, tells Odo of Kira's arrest.

As the Federation fleet becomes overwhelmed, a Klingon fleet arrives and flanks the Dominion. They clear a path for the Defiant, though the rest of the allied ships are unable to follow.

Rom's brother Quark and Dukat's daughter Ziyal free Jake, Kira, Rom, and Leeta from jail. Kira and Rom set off to sabotage the station's weapons. They are cornered by Dominion soldiers, but are rescued by Odo and his security team. Rom disables the weapons, but seconds too late to prevent the destruction of the minefield.

Sisko orders the Defiant into the wormhole, where they encounter a massive Dominion fleet. As Sisko prepares for a desperate suicide mission, he receives a vision from the Bajoran Prophets, the powerful aliens who live in the wormhole, who are upset that he intends to sacrifice himself before fulfilling their purposes. Sisko pleads with them to help the Bajorans, who created a religion around them. The Prophets cause the Dominion ships to vanish, but warn Sisko that a penance will be exacted.

The Defiant exits the wormhole and fires on the station, which cannot respond due to Rom's sabotage. Meanwhile, the Klingons and the Federation have outflanked the Dominion fleet, with 200 ships heading for Deep Space Nine. The Dominion evacuates, but Ziyal refuses to leave, confessing to her father that she helped Kira and her friends escape. Damar overhears her confession and shoots her as an enemy of the state. Dukat collapses in grief as she dies in his arms.

By the time Sisko arrives on the station, Dukat is in a holding cell, shattered and sobbing over his defeat and the loss of his daughter. As he is escorted to the infirmary, he returns Captain Sisko's baseball.

== Reception ==
This had Nielsen ratings of 6.4 points, which was about 6.3 million viewers when it was broadcast on television in November 1997.

In 2013, IGN ranked "Sacrifice of Angels" the 23rd best episode of all Star Trek television, noting it has a "dramatic showdown" that helped set the stage for the Dominion War story arc that continues in this season.

A 2015 binge-watching guide for Star Trek: Deep Space Nine by Wired recommended not skipping this essential episode.

In 2015, Geek.com recommended this episode as "essential watching" for their abbreviated Star Trek: Deep Space Nine binge-watching guide.

In 2018, Vulture rated "Sacrifice of Angels" the ninth best episode of Star Trek: Deep Space Nine. They also recommended the entire sixth season, remarking "It's that good" and praising the war saga's evolution. They note how "Sacrifice of Angels" is the culmination of a story arc that spans the six previous episodes.

io9 ranked "Favor the Bold " when paired with "Sacrifice of Angels", as the 88th best episodic presentation of all Star Trek in a 2014 listing. They note this episode as featuring a special effect sequence depicting a particularly large space battle.

In 2016, The Hollywood Reporter rated "Sacrifice of Angels" along with its five preceding episodes as among the twenty greatest episodes (or sequences of episodes) in Star Trek: Deep Space Nine. This six-episode arc is noted for its serialized format, compared to shorter two-episode stories that had been more common to the Star Trek franchise up to that time.

As a six-episode arc:

- "A Time to Stand"
- "Rocks and Shoals"
- "Sons and Daughters"
- "Behind the Lines"
- "Favor the Bold"
- "Sacrifice of Angels"

The last two in the sequence have also been reviewed as a two-part saga. Sometimes the episode prior to "A Time to Stand", "Call to Arms" is also included in this story arc, for a full seven-episode saga.

In 2018, CBR ranked "Favor the Bold" and "Sacrifice of Angels" as the third best episodic saga of Star Trek overall, behind "The Best of Both Worlds" (Parts I & II) from Star Trek: The Next Generation.

In 2016, Empire ranked this the 45th best out of the top fifty episodes of the 700 plus Star Trek television episodes.

In 2016, The Washington Post called the Dominion war story arc possibly the "richest narrative" of the Star Trek universe.

In 2020, The Digital Fix ranked this episode as the eighth best episode of Deep Space Nine.
