= Adopted child syndrome =

Disputed syndrome

Adopted child syndrome is a term that has been used to explain behaviors in adopted children that are claimed to be related to their adoptive status. Specifically, these include problems in bonding, attachment disorders, lying, stealing, defiance of authority, and acts of violence. The term has never achieved acceptance in the professional community. The term is not found in the American Psychiatric Association's Diagnostic and Statistical Manual, 4th edition, TR.

== History of the term ==
David Kirschner, who coined the term, says that most adoptees are not disturbed and that the syndrome only applies to "a small clinical subgroup."

Researchers Brodizinsky, Schechter, and Henig find that in a review of the literature, generally children adopted before the age of six months fare no differently than children raised with their biological parents. Later problems that develop among children adopted from the child welfare system at an older age are usually associated with the effects of chronic early maltreatment in the caregiving relationship; abuse and neglect.

Psychologist Betty Jean Lifton, herself an adopted person, has written extensively on psychopathology in adopted people, primarily in Lost and Found: The Adoption Experience, and Journey of the Adopted Self: A Quest for Wholeness and briefly discusses adopted child syndrome.

== See also ==
- Child abuse
- Child welfare
- Attachment disorder
- Relative outcomes of parenting by biological and adoptive parents
