= Relative outcomes of parenting by biological and adoptive parents =

Research into relative outcomes of parenting by biological and adoptive parents has produced a variety of results. When socioeconomic differences between two-biological-parent and two-adoptive-parent households are controlled for, the two types of families tend to invest a similar amount of resources. A 20-year longitudinal study of 245 adoptees placed in the first few months of life that compared the children's cognitive abilities with those of their birth and adoptive parents found that before age 5, the adoptees' cognitive skills correlated more with those in their adoptive families, but as the adoptees matured, their cognitive skills, including verbal ability, became more like those of their biological parents; thus, the study concluded that "environmental transmission from parent to offspring has little effect on later cognitive ability." Adopted siblings have, on average, an IQ score 4.4 points higher than the siblings who are reared by their biological parents and 3.18 point increase for half-siblings reared by their biological parents.

A study found that although parents did rate their adoptive children higher in negative traits and behaviors like arrogance and stealing, they scored both adopted and biological children similarly when it came to positive traits like conscientiousness and persistence. A 2004 study found that after gaining a child (whether through birth or adoption), respondents reported less depressed affect, more disagreements with their spouse, and more support from their own parents, but it appeared the experience of becoming an adoptive parent or a stepparent was less stressful than the adjustment to biological parenthood.
