= Julian Bashir =

Fictional character in the TV series Star Trek: Deep Space Nine

- Star Trek character
- First appearance: "Emissary" (1993)
- Last appearance: "Fissure Quest" (2024)
- Portrayed by: Alexander Siddig

In-universe information
- Species: Human (genetically enhanced)
- Affiliation: United Federation of Planets; Starfleet
- Family: Richard Bashir (father); Amsha Bashir (mother)
- Posting: Deep Space Nine; USS Defiant
- Position: Chief Medical Officer
- Rank: Lieutenant, Junior Grade Season 1-3; Lieutenant Season 4-7

Julian Subatoi Bashir, MD is a fictional character from the television series Star Trek: Deep Space Nine, portrayed by Alexander Siddig. Bashir is the Chief Medical Officer (CMO) of space station Deep Space Nine and the USS Defiant.

== Overview ==
In first grade, Jules Bashir showed great difficulty in learning and was of below-average height and weight for his age. Shortly before his seventh birthday, his parents, Richard and Amsha Bashir, had him subjected to genetic engineering. The procedure made him mentally superior to most humans, and greatly enhanced his physical abilities. However, because human genetic engineering had been declared illegal in the United Federation of Planets except in cases of correcting serious birth defects, Bashir and his parents kept his procedure a secret throughout most of his adult life. At the age of 15, he learned of what had been done to him and began using the first name Julian, reasoning that the modifications had erased his original self from existence. To save Bashir from losing his Starfleet commission and medical license, Richard agrees to plead guilty to illegal genetic engineering and serve two years in prison (DS9 episode: "Doctor Bashir, I Presume?").

Bashir graduated second in his class at Starfleet Medical Academy, having intentionally missed a question on his final exam (DS9: "Distant Voices"). He had his choice of assignments anywhere in the fleet, and so chose Deep Space Nine for the opportunity to practice "real-life frontier medicine" (DS9: "Emissary"). He holds the rank of Lieutenant (j.g.) at the time of the series pilot, and Lieutenant from the fourth season premiere until the series finale.

Early on, his overly enthusiastic and self-important nature made some members of the crew, such as Miles O'Brien and Kira Nerys, reluctant to spend time with him. However, he eventually becomes friends with O'Brien, Jadzia Dax, and Elim Garak. Bashir flirts with Jadzia, who rejects his advances and goes on to marry Worf. After her death, Bashir joins Worf on a dangerous mission to ensure Jadzia's soul a place in Sto-Vo-Kor.

Bashir's closest friend is O'Brien, and they are frequently shown playing games (like darts) or visiting the holodeck for the recreation of one of several historical battles such as the Alamo or the Battle of Britain. He is also close friends with Elim Garak, with whom he often shares lunch in the Replimat.

During pre-Dominion war tensions, Bashir is kidnapped (sometime before "Rapture," when new uniforms are introduced) and sent to a Dominion prison camp and replaced with a Changeling (revealed during "In Purgatory's Shadow"). His replacement attempts to destroy the Bajoran sun, with the goal of wiping out Bajor, DS9, and a fleet of Federation, Klingon, and Romulan ships ("By Inferno's Light"). The DS9 crew foil the plan, and the real Bashir, along with his fellow captives, shortly thereafter free themselves. The experience (and his outing as a genetically engineered person) began a slow personality change over the course of the series into a much more somber, dark character.

Later, Bashir attempts to integrate several other genetically engineered individuals into Federation culture, with mixed success ("Statistical Probabilities," "Chrysalis").

The covert operations group Section 31 also becomes interested in him and tries twice, unsuccessfully, to "recruit" him ("Inquisition," "Inter Arma Enim Silent Leges"). Twice he was possessed by evil aliens "The Passenger" and "Dramatis Personae" and twice he was trapped and almost killed in Holodeck games: "Move Along Home" and "Our Man Bashir".

As depicted in the series finale "What You Leave Behind," Bashir remains aboard Deep Space Nine, and begins a romantic relationship with Ezri Dax.

In the Mirror Universe, the alternative Bashir is a freedom fighter in the Terran Rebellion. It is unknown whether he was ever given the genetic enhancements his counterpart was. Unlike the regular Bashir, who is friendly and personable, alternative Bashir is an angry, unkempt former slave who joins the rebellion against the Klingon/Cardassian Alliance.

In Star Trek: Lower Decks season 5, an alternate reality version of Bashir serves aboard the Section 31 Defiant-class ship Anaximander from the prime universe. Unlike the prime Bashir, this Bashir is an emergency medical hologram -- similar to the Doctor -- who is based on Bashir. Like the Doctor, he possesses a mobile emitter. An "interdimensional castaway," Bashir fell in love with and married an Elim Garak from a different alternate universe that he met on the Anaximander. This version of Bashir has a brief cameo appearance in the series finale "The New Next Generation," standing on the Anaximander's bridge with Garak when the ship returns to the prime universe.

== Reception ==
The character of Julian Bashir initially sparked fan criticism. Alexander Siddig expressed his enthusiasm for the fact that he, with his English accent, unusual screen name at time of casting (Siddig El Fadil), and North African heritage was a main character on a prominent television show despite being not as easily racially identifiable to audiences as many other actors and characters were on TV at the time.

- In 2016, Bashir was ranked as the 25th most important character of Starfleet within the Star Trek science fiction universe by Wired magazine.
- In 2016, SyFy ranked Bashir as the fifth best of the seven main-cast space doctors of the Star Trek franchise.
- In 2018, CBR ranked Bashir the 16th best Starfleet character of Star Trek.
- In 2018, The Wrap placed Bashir as 15th out 39 in a ranking of main cast characters of the Star Trek franchise prior to Star Trek: Discovery.

== Guest appearances ==
Alexander Siddig played his role of Dr. Julian Bashir in the Star Trek: The Next Generation season six episode "Birthright, Part I", a season concurrent to DS9's first season.

In 2024, he also reprised his role of Dr. Julian Bashir in Season 5 of Star Trek: Lower Decks in a cameo.
