= Ira Steven Behr =

American screen writer and television producer

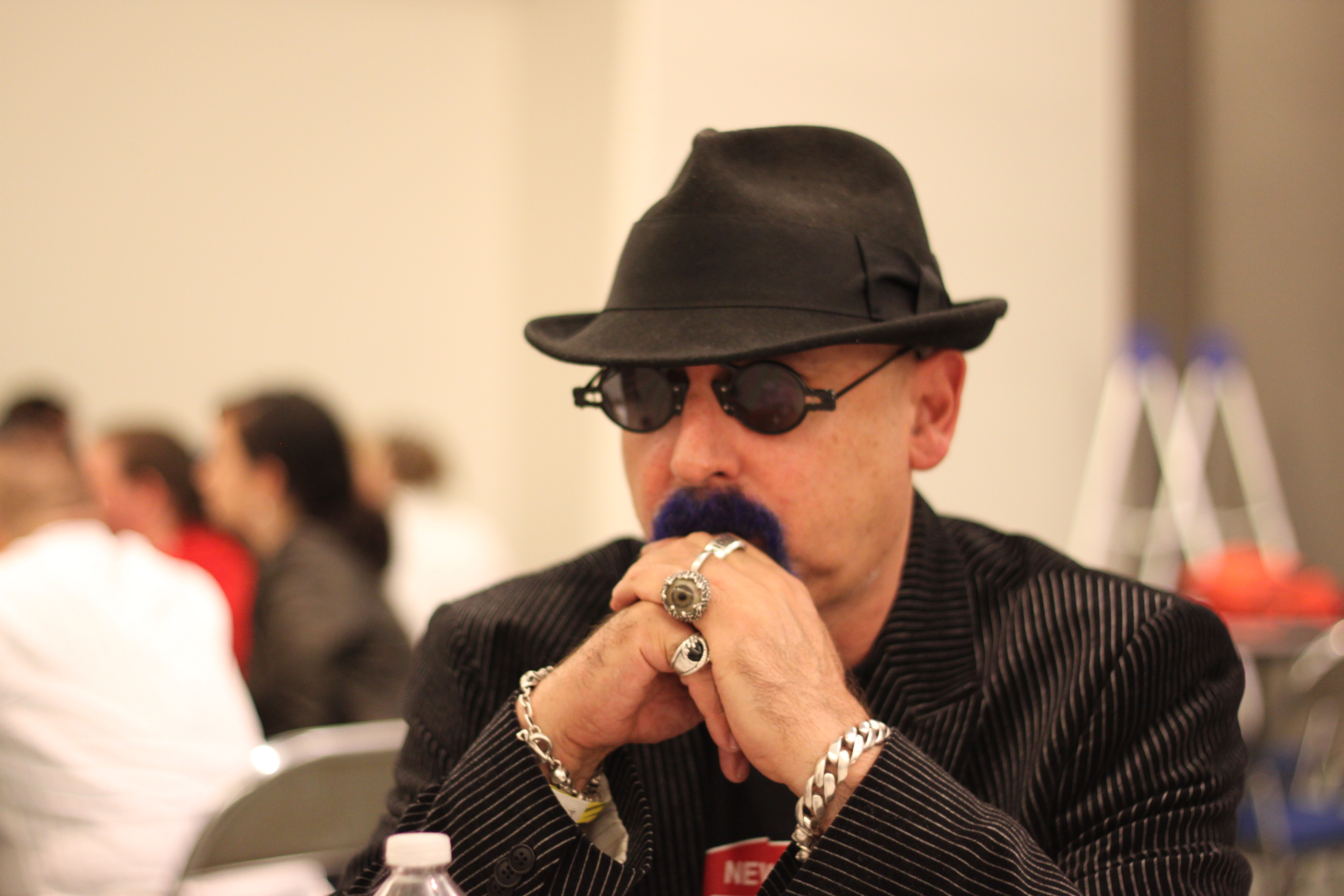
- Pictured at San Diego Comicon 2011
- Born: October 23, 1953 (age 71); New York, New York, U.S.
- Occupation(s): Television screenwriter and producer
- Known for: Star Trek: Deep Space Nine
- Spouse: Laura Behr

Ira Steven Behr (born October 23, 1953) is an American screenwriter and television producer, best known for his work on Star Trek, especially Star Trek: Deep Space Nine, on which he served as showrunner and executive producer. He was the executive producer and showrunner on Crash, executive producer on Syfy's Alphas and a writer and co-executive producer on Outlander.

== Biography ==
Behr was born in New York City to a Jewish family. He studied at Lehman College in New York City. After graduating, he moved to Los Angeles to pursue a career writing comedies for television and film.

Behr is married to Laura Feder, who is credited as choreographer on three episodes of Deep Space Nine and one episode of Voyager.

== Career ==
=== Early work ===
Behr's first writing job was on the dramatic series Bret Maverick. Behr continued to work on television dramas, throughout the 1980s, among them:

- Jessica Novak (1981, story editor)
- Fame (1982, writer and producer)
- Seven Brides for Seven Brothers (1982, writer)
- Bring 'Em Back Alive (1982, writer)
- Once a Hero (1987, writer and producer)
- The Bronx Zoo (1987, writer)

=== Star Trek ===
After several years writing and producing television, and while still a staff writer at Beyond Reality, Behr was hired as a producer during Star Trek: The Next Generation's third season.

Behr felt there were too many rules and regulations and felt creatively trapped, so he left The Next Generation after a year. He remained good friends with Michael Piller and wrote the season 4 episode "Qpid" as a freelance writer. Piller persuaded him to join the new series Star Trek: Deep Space Nine as a supervising producer. At the start of the second season, Behr was promoted to co-executive producer. The following year, co-creator Michael Piller left to produce the next Star Trek series, Star Trek: Voyager and Behr replaced him as showrunner and executive producer. As showrunner, Behr reported to head executive producer and franchise chief Rick Berman. Although they would disagree on many things, Behr said they had a good working relationship.

Behr went on to write a total of 53 out of 176 Deep Space Nine episodes, more than any other writer.

As executive producer, Behr was largely responsible for the story arc of the show, from Bajoran politics to the Dominion War. This complex serialized story was a departure from the traditional Star Trek episodic format, and the war narrative was a break from the typically hopeful Star Trek vision of the future.

Behr wrote or co-wrote some of the most important episodes in the Dominion arc, including "The Jem'Hadar", "The Search", "The Way of the Warrior", "Broken Link", "Apocalypse Rising", "In Purgatory's Shadow", "By Inferno's Light", "Call to Arms", "Sacrifice of Angels", "Tears of the Prophets" and the final episode, "What You Leave Behind".

==== Developing the Ferengi ====
Behr also had a significant role in the development of the Ferengi alien race during his work on Deep Space Nine. Although the Ferengi were first introduced in the first season of The Next Generation as a potential major antagonist, they proved unsuccessful, and in subsequent seasons became an occasional source of comic relief. But it was not until Deep Space Nine, which included a Ferengi character in its regular cast, that the Ferengi were truly explored in any depth. Behr was involved with most of the early Ferengi-related episodes, and introduced the concept of the Ferengi Rules of Acquisition and wrote most of the rules which appeared on the show. These rules were later published as The Ferengi Rules of Acquisition, by Quark as told to Ira Steven Behr (ISBN 0-671-52936-6). Along with fellow Deep Space Nine producer Robert Hewitt Wolfe, Behr also co-wrote Legends of the Ferengi, a collection of short stories involving the Rules of Acquisition.(ISBN 0-671-57901-0)

==== Documentary ====
Behr was the driving force behind the documentary What We Left Behind.

=== Post-Star Trek ===
Behr left Star Trek following the completion of Deep Space Nine's seventh season in 1999. He again worked with René Echevarria on season two of Dark Angel (2000) as a consulting producer. Behr served as writer and executive producer on the short lived series Bob Patterson (2001), which was created by and starred Jason Alexander. He returned to Paramount for the revival of The Twilight Zone (2002) as writer and executive producer. It aired on UPN directly after Star Trek: Enterprise, and ran for a single season of 42 episodes. Behr described the fast production turnaround as insane but, despite the difficulty he found the camaraderie and the dedication in the writer's room rewarding, and said that almost all of the writers would have been willing to do it again for another season if they had been given the chance. He thought UPN did not really want the show, and that it was not a good fit for the network. He also worked as writer and consulting producer on the series Dr. Vegas (2004). René Echevarria created the series The 4400 (2004–2007), which Behr joined as a writer and took over as executive producer. The series ran for four seasons, and Behr enjoyed the experience and thought "we did some really good episodes."

In 2017 Behr produced the feature film Lucky starring Harry Dean Stanton.

=== Crash: Season 2 ===
In February 2009, Behr was named head writer for the Starz TV series Crash (based on the Paul Haggis film) as it headed into Season 2, which aired in the fall of 2009. After his disappointment at the cancellation of The 4400, people were surprised that Behr chose to join the struggling show. He saw it as an opportunity, as they would be more open and willing to do things differently than if it had been a more successful show. Lead actor Dennis Hopper died in May 2010 and the series was not renewed for a third season.

=== Alphas ===
In December 2010, Behr was appointed head writer, show runner, and executive producer for Syfy Channel's Alphas, for which a pilot, written by Zak Penn and Michael Karnow and directed by Jack Bender, had been produced. Behr oversaw the remaining ten episodes of the eleven-episode first season.

=== Outlander ===
From 2014 to 2016, Behr served as writer and co-executive producer on Outlander, alongside fellow Deep Space Nine contributor Ronald D. Moore.
