= J. G. Hertzler =

American actor (b. 1950)

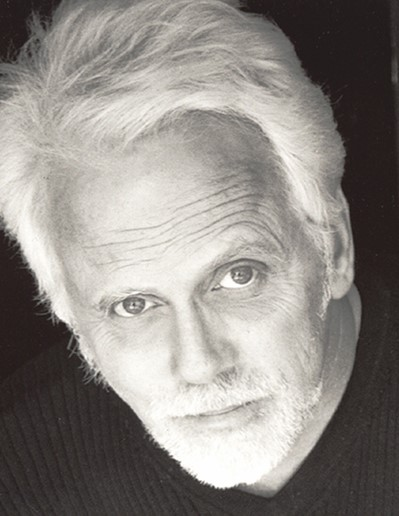
- Hertzler (2011)
- Born: March 18, 1950 (age 76); Savannah, Georgia, U.S.
- Other name: John Noah Hertzler
- Education: Bucknell University; University of Maryland; American University
- Occupations: Actor; author; screenwriter; activist
- Years active: 1978–present
- Children: 1

John Garman Hertzler Jr. (born March 18, 1950) is an American actor, author, screenwriter, and activist best known for his role on Star Trek: Deep Space Nine as the Klingon General (later Chancellor) Martok, whom he portrayed from 1995 until the series' end in 1999.

Hertzler began his acting career in the 1970s, doing mostly stage acting and appearing in some films. He guest starred in a few episodes for different television shows before landing the part of Alcalde Ignacio De Soto in the early 1990s show Zorro. In addition to Deep Space Nine, Hertzler has appeared on several other Star Trek shows, written two Star Trek novels, and has made appearances at Star Trek and science fiction conventions. Hertzler lives in the Finger Lakes region of New York where he was a lecturer at Cornell University's theater department, and has been active in the area's regional politics, as well as writing a screenplay.

== Early life and education ==
Hertzler was born in Savannah, Georgia. His parents were from Port Royal, Pennsylvania, and his family is descended from German-speaking Amish families. His father John G. Hertzler served in the U.S. Air Force, and his mother Eleanor Frances Beaver Hertzler was a Latin and French teacher. His family lived in cities around the world including: St. Joseph, Missouri; El Paso, Texas; and Casablanca in Morocco. He grew up mostly in the Washington, D.C., area, and attended Bucknell University, playing linebacker on their football squad. While there, he got into acting when the drama department recruited him for a production of Marat/Sade as they were looking for a big guy for one of the roles. After graduating in political science in 1972, he got his master's in set design at the University of Maryland, and attended law school for a year at American University. While he was in the DC area, he worked in the federal government, including with the Nixon Administration for the National Environmental Policy Act, and took an assortment of jobs to practice theatre including waiting at a dinner theater, bartending, and taxi-driving.

== Career ==
Hertzler worked in the Washington area on theatre projects. On the movie screen, he portrayed Lucas in the horror film The Redeemer: Son of Satan (also known as Class Reunion Massacre), which was released in 1978. Hertzler also had a role in the feature film And Justice for All which starred Al Pacino, released in 1979. He also worked in New York City on the Broadway production The Bacchae as King Pentheus. In 1981, he moved to San Francisco to join the American Conservatory Theater (ACT) where he acted and directed in a number of productions including The Admirable Crichton, Richard II, Dial M for Murder, and a number of Shakespeare productions. He was an instructor with ACT, and had also worked with other theater productions such as Medea with the Cincinnati Playhouse. He moved to Southern California in 1988 and continued theatre work there.

His first notable guest role on television was in 1990 on the Quantum Leap episode "The Sea Bride – June 3, 1954". His first major television role was in the 1990s series Zorro as Alcalde Ignacio De Soto, the antagonist character who replaces Ramone as the Alcalde (Mayor) of Los Angeles in the third and fourth seasons. The show was filmed in a studio lot outside of Madrid, Spain, and was broadcast on The Family Channel. He was also involved in a television movie called Treasure Island: The Adventure Begins where he played a pirate called Black Dog. Treasure Island was broadcast to go along with a promotion for the casino resort in Las Vegas.

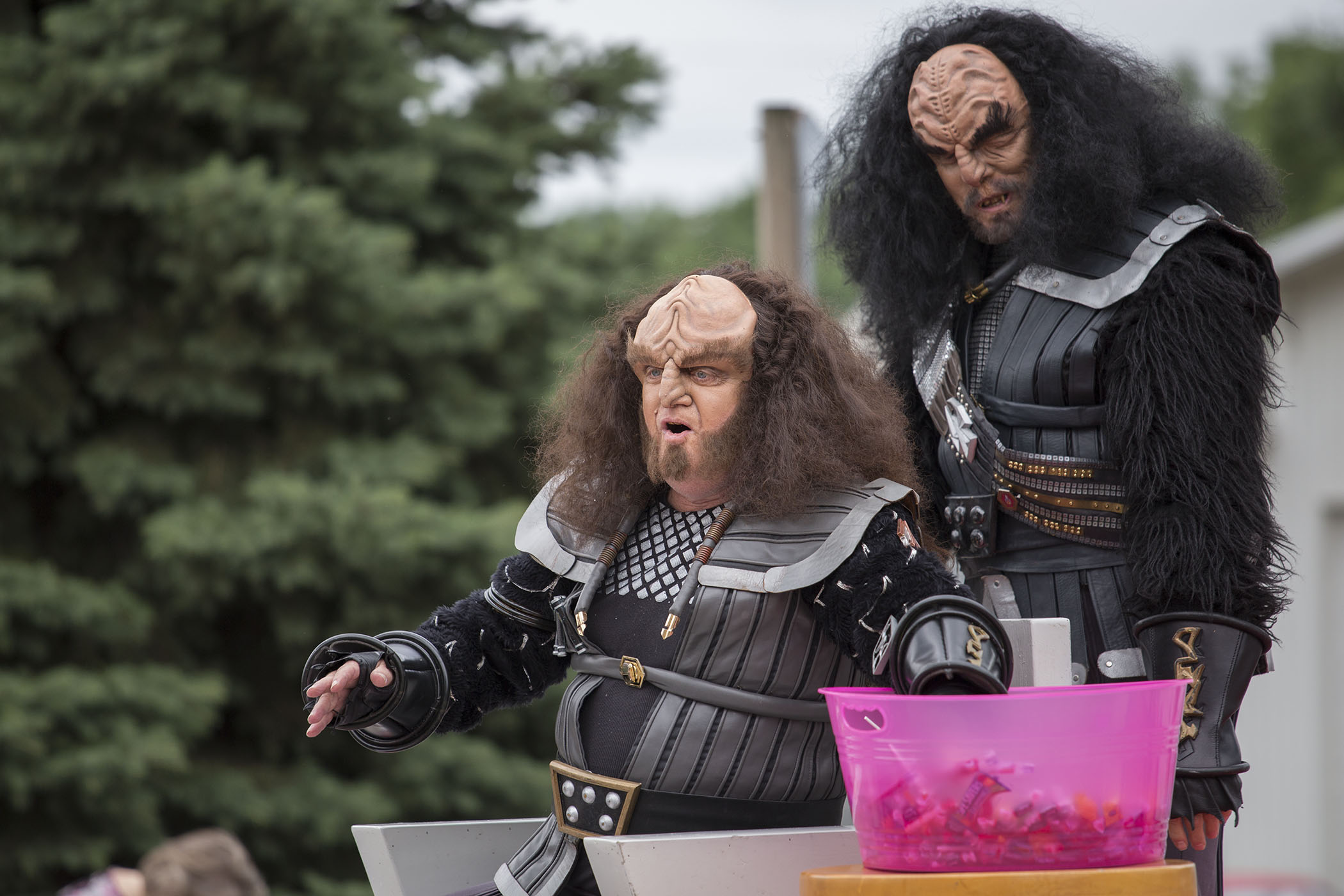
Hertzler (standing) as Martok, with Robert O'Reilly as Gowron, at the Riverside Trek Fest in 2014

Hertzler's first involvement in Star Trek: Deep Space Nine was in the series' pilot episode "Emissary" as the Vulcan captain of the Federation starship Saratoga. In an interview with Startrek.com, Hertzler said he had worked with Patrick Stewart at the Paramount Studios lot where Stewart ran some Shakespeare workshops. He would later audition for DS9 multiple times, but did not receive any roles. He was at the Paramount Studios auditioning for another series when DS9 casting director Ron Surma had him read for Klingon General Martok. At first, Hertzler portrayed Martok as a mild-mannered Klingon, but when he was asked to make him angrier, he picked up a chair and threw it into a wall. The chair's leg stuck briefly and he said he had also inadvertently ripped his thumbnail causing it to bleed, but it had impressed the auditors and he landed the part.

Martok debuted in the season 4 premiere "The Way of the Warrior" followed by the season 5 premiere "Apocalypse Rising". His character was originally a changeling (shapeshifter) Dominion impostor. Hertzler said the writers chose Martok to be the changeling, because they thought that making the Klingon Chancellor Gowron to be an imposter was "too pat or too easy." After the Martok changeling was killed in the episode Apocalypse Rising, the writers then brought in the real Martok as a recurring character starting in season 5, during which he portrayed a one-eyed Klingon. He would play Martok for three seasons including the finale, by which time he had replaced Gowron as the leader of the Klingon Empire. Hertzler describes the part as an actor's dream because of its physicality and range. The character has been involved in many aspects of Deep Space Nine including frequently interacting with Worf.

Hertzler played other characters in DS9, including a changeling named Laas, in the episode "Chimera", who interacts with main character Odo. In an interview with Little Review, Hertzler said that he was concerned he would be recognized as Martok despite the makeup and character change, but it worked out okay. Credited as Garman Hertzler for the episode, he said that he got a chance to interact with some of the lead characters that Martok would not encounter, especially the ones played by Nana Visitor and René Auberjonois. In portraying Laas, Hertzler said he tried to act like William Shatner, but with a higher pitch. Another guest character he portrayed was Roy Ritterhouse, a painter/sketcher in the season 6 episode "Far Beyond the Stars".

Following the end of DS9, Hertzler played a Hirogen in the Star Trek: Voyager episode "Tsunkatse", which was noted for featuring pro wrestler Dwayne "The Rock" Johnson. In the episode, he and The Rock are conscripted alien fighters. Hertzler said that he also got to wrestle actress Jeri Ryan who played Seven of Nine. In Star Trek: Enterprise, he played a Klingon lawyer in the episode "Judgment" and a Klingon Captain in the episode "Borderland". He made appearances at Star Trek and science fiction conventions and events. In 2015, Hertzler joined the cast on the fan-funded short film Star Trek: Axanar as Captain Samuel Travis of the Federation.

Outside of the Star Trek world, Hertzler appeared in the television film Pirates of Silicon Valley where he portrayed director Ridley Scott. He made guest appearances on Six Feet Under, Roswell, Charmed, and Highlander: The Series.

In 1995–96, he was involved in a national tour for the stage theatre production of Dial M for Murder, in which he portrayed Max Halliday, an American writer who gets involved in a love triangle.

Hertzler has been involved in voice-over for video games and audio productions. Outside some Star Trek titles, he was the voice of Dr. Grossman in BioShock. Hertzler narrated the audio book entitled Barsk: The Elephants' Graveyard, written by Star Trek linguist Lawrence Schoen.

=== New York theater and teaching ===
During the 2005–2006 season, Hertzler played the role of Henry Drummond in productions of Inherit the Wind at Geva Theatre Center and Cornell University's Schwartz Center for the Performing Arts.

In 2007, Hertzler moved to Ulysses, New York, and became a Resident Professional Teaching Associate (RPTA) in the Cornell University Department of Theatre, Film & Dance, where he has directed or performed in a number of productions through the 2010 season. In 2009, Hertzler directed an outdoor production of A Midsummer Night's Dream for the Ithaca Shakespeare Company at the F.R. Newman Arboretum. He also portrayed Lord Capulet in Cornell's production of Romeo and Juliet, which involved students as well as professional actors.

After Cornell, Hertzler has continued to do acting and teaching in the New York area, including hosting a workshop about Shakespeare acting.

=== Writing ===
Hertzler co-authored with novelist Jeffrey Lang two Star Trek novels, Left Hand of Destiny, Book 1, and Left Hand of Destiny, Book 2. which were published by Simon & Schuster. The novels follow Martok's and Worf's adventures following Deep Space Nine as they return to Q'onoS, with much of the focus on Martok's life.

Hertzler has also written an original screenplay, Dancing with Sancho Panza, inspired by his time in Spain when he worked on Zorro. In June 2016, the announcement was made that the screenplay will be directed by Luis Mandoki with an anticipated release date of November 2017.

=== Activism ===
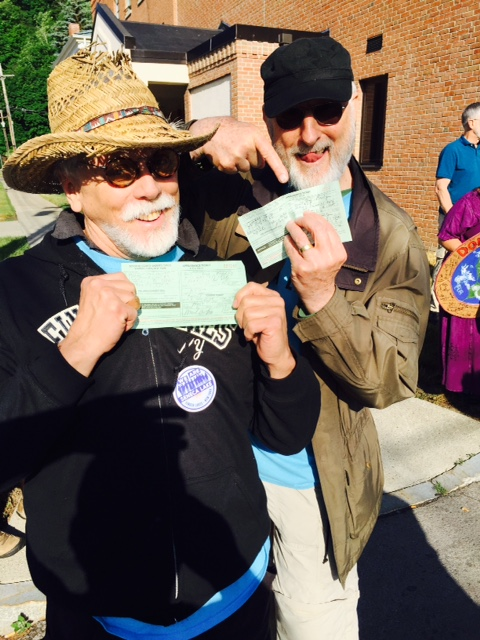
Hertzler and actor James Cromwell show their arrest citations at the Crestwood station protest (June 2016)

In 2013, Hertzler ran for a position on the Ulysses town council. His involvement in politics was partly because of the issue of hydraulic fracturing and concerns that the method of drilling for natural gas would destroy the Finger Lakes region. He also wanted the region's schools to get more state aid. He was elected and served on the board for a two-year term. In 2016, he was elected to the town council board for a four-year term extending to 2020.

In the 2016 election, Hertzler endorsed Senator Bernie Sanders for President.

Hertzler and fellow Star Trek actor James Cromwell were among nineteen people arrested for disorderly conduct during a protest outside a Crestwood Midstream compressor station in Watkins Glen, New York, on June 6, 2016. They were involved in the "We Are Seneca Lake" civil disobedience campaign against the Federal Energy Regulatory Commission green-lighting underground gas storage in Seneca Lake's salt caverns, despite public opposition.

On June 8, 2017, Hertzler announced his candidacy as a U.S. House Representative for New York's 23rd congressional district in the 2018 midterm elections. As part of his campaign appearances, he planned to act "in the persona of Mark Twain", to present his ideas "through the brilliant humorist for all ages". He stated that this was a tribute both to Twain, who resided once in Elmira, and to actor Hal Holbrook, who had portrayed Twain on stage for more than six decades. On September 25, 2017, Hertzler announced his decision to leave the Democratic Party and run as an independent. He advanced in the primary in June 2018, but later withdrew his candidacy prior to November.

== Filmography ==
=== Television ===
Year	Title	Role	Notes	Ref.
1990	Quantum Leap	Weathers Farrington	Ep. "Sea Bride – June 3, 1954"	
1991–93	Zorro	Alcalde Ignacio de Soto		
1992	Highlander	Marcus Korolus	Ep. "See No Evil"	
1993–99	Star Trek: Deep Space Nine	Martok, others	Also Vulcan Captain in "Emissary" as "John Noah Hertzler." Credited as "Garman Hertzler" as Laas in "Chimera"	
1994	The Adventures of Brisco County, Jr.	Edward Hayes / Myron Stempler	Ep. "Bounty Hunters Convention"	
1994	Dr. Quinn, Medicine Woman	Captain Burgoyne	Ep. "The Washington Affair: Parts 1 and 2"	
1996	Seinfeld	Mr. Berger	Ep. "The Wait Out"	
1996	Lois & Clark: The New Adventures of Superman	Trey	Eps. "Battleground Earth", "Lord of the Flys"	
1999	Pirates of Silicon Valley	Ridley Scott	TV film	
2000	Star Trek: Voyager	Hirogen Hunter	Ep. "Tsunkatse"	
2000	Charmed	Council member	Ep. "Be Careful What You Witch For"	
2000	Roswell	Mr. Lafeber	Ep. "Ask Not"	
2000	Touched by an Angel		Ep. "The Face on the Barroom Floor"	
2002	Everybody Loves Raymond	Everett Muncie	Ep. "Who Am I?"	
2003–04	Star Trek: Enterprise	Advocate Kolos, Klingon Captain	Ep. "Judgment", Ep. "Borderland"	
2004–05	Six Feet Under	Gallery owner		
	General Hospital	Gen. Stark		
2020–22	Star Trek: Lower Decks	Drookmani Captain, Martok	3 episodes	

=== Film ===
Year	Title	Role	Notes	Ref.
1978	The Redeemer: Son of Satan	Davis		
1979	And Justice For All	The other driver		
1994	Treasure Island: The Adventure Begins	Black Dog	Promotional TV film produced by Treasure Island Resort & Casino	
1998	The Prophecy II	Father William		
2014	Prelude to Axanar	Admiral Samuel Travis	Fan-produced film. Limited release at Comic-Con	
TBA	Dancing with Sancho Panza		Screenwriter, in pre-production	

=== Video games ===
Year	Title	Role	Notes	Ref.
1996	Star Trek: Klingon	Ler' at		
2000	Star Trek: Armada	Martok	Grouped under Voice Over	
2001	Star Trek: Armada II	Chancellor Martok		
2003	Star Trek: Elite Force II	Lurok	Grouped under Additional Voices	
2007	The Golden Compass	Various characters	Grouped under Actor	
2007	BioShock	Dr. Grossman	Grouped under Actors	
2008	Dead Space	Captain Benjamin Mathius		
2010	BioShock 2	Dr. Grossman		
2013	Injustice: Gods Among Us	Deathstroke, Ares		
2017 - 2021	Star Trek Online	Martok	Multiple Missions including "Brushfire", "Scylla and Charybdis"	
