= Odo (Star Trek) =

Character in Star Trek: Deep Space Nine

- Star Trek: Deep Space Nine character
- First appearance: "Emissary" (1993)
- Last appearance: "Kobayashi" (2022)
- Portrayed by: René Auberjonois

In-universe information
- Species: Changeling
- Affiliation: Bajoran Militia
- Significant other: Kira Nerys
- Posting: Deep Space Nine
- Position: Chief of Security
- Rank: Constable (Informal)

Odo /ˈoʊdoʊ/, played by René Auberjonois, is a fictional character in the science fiction television series Star Trek: Deep Space Nine. He is a member of a shape-shifting species called Changelings and serves as the head of security for the space station Deep Space Nine on which the show is set. Intelligent, observant, and taciturn, Odo uses his unique abilities throughout the show to maintain security on the DS9 station and later aids the Bajoran people and the Federation throughout the Dominion War against his own people, the Founders.

== Overview ==
=== Star Trek: Deep Space Nine ===
The original Writer's Bible from 1992 for Star Trek: Deep Space Nine described Odo as follows:

Odo, an alien male, middle-aged curmudgeon, and a shape-shifter. In his natural state he is a gelatinous liquid. He was a Bajoran law enforcement officer on the space station under the Cardassians. Starfleet decides to have him continue in that role, since he's extremely savvy about the Promenade and all who frequent it. His backstory is: 50 years ago, with no memory of his past, he was found alone in a mysterious spacecraft that appeared in the Denorios asteroid belt. He was found by the Bajoran and lived amongst them. At first he was sort of an Elephant Man, a source of curiosity and humor as he turned himself into a chair or pencil. Finally he realized he would have to take the form of a humanoid to assimilate and function in their environment. He does it, but resents it. As a result, Odo performs a uniquely important role in the ensemble: he is a character who explores and comments on Human values. Because he is forced to pass as one of us, his point of view usually comes with a cynical and critical edge. But he can't quite get it right, this humanoid shape, though he continues to try. So he looks a little unfinished in a way. He's been working on it a long time. Someone might ask him: Why don't you take the form of a younger man. His answer: I would if I could. He has the adopted child syndrome, searching for his own personal identity. Although he doesn't know anything about his species, he is certain that justice is an integral part of their being, because the necessity for it runs through every fiber of his body – a racial memory. That's why he became a law man. He has a couple of Bajoran deputies; he doesn't allow weapons on the Promenade, and once every day he must return to his gelatinous form.

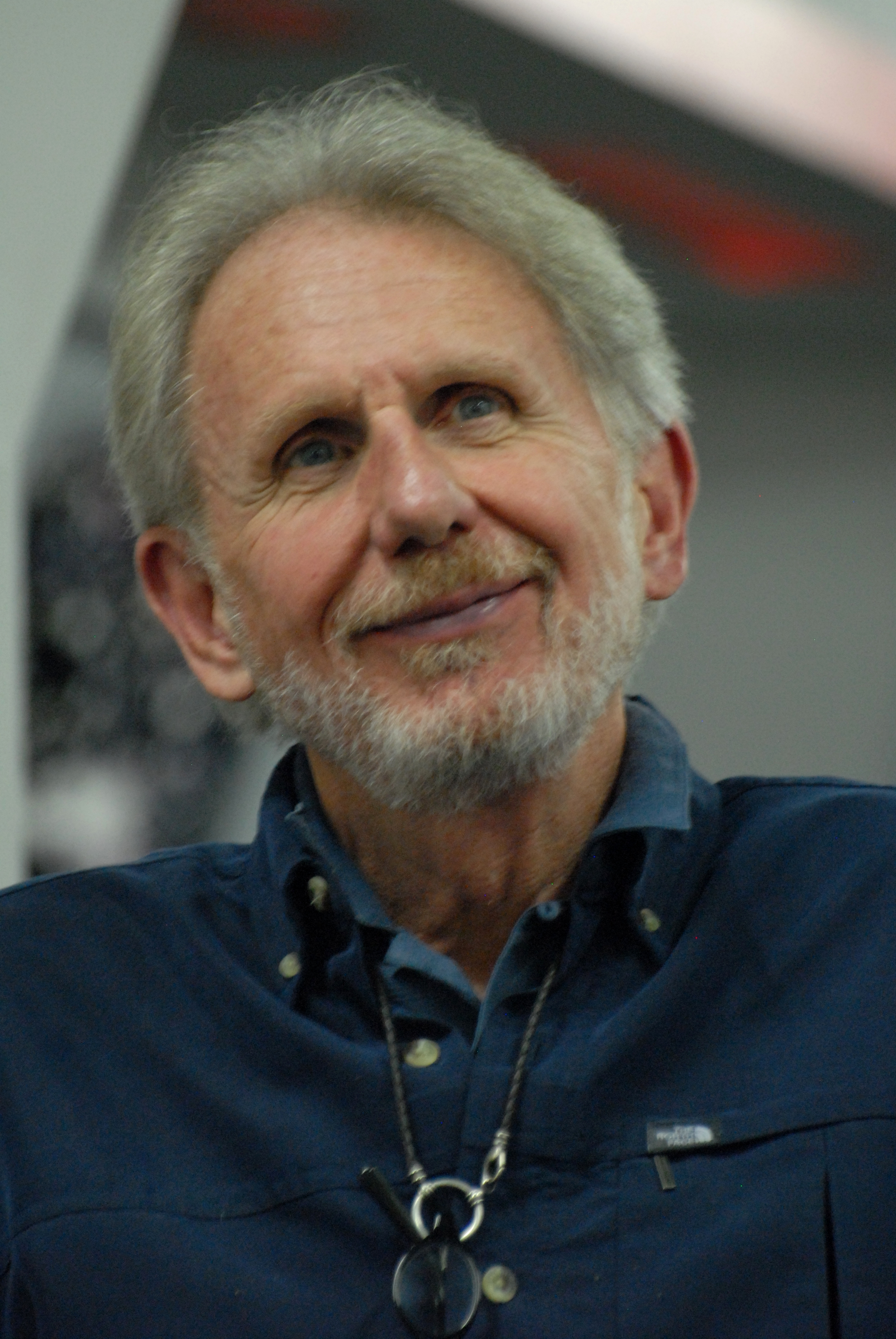
Odo was portrayed in Star Trek: Deep Space Nine by actor René Auberjonois

Actor René Auberjonois describes Odo as "a very unformed being" who was "trying to get some kind of shape to his life". Co-creator of Star Trek: Deep Space Nine, Michael Piller, speaks of Odo's role within the show as being prompted by needing "a character who represented the traditions of Spock and Data, the outsider who looks in at humanity."

Late in the fifth season, in the episode "Children of Time", an Odo who has lived an additional 200 years tells the "current" Kira Nerys that he has loved her from the time their friendship first began. With this revelation, Kira and the "current" Odo eventually become a couple.

According to the backstory of the series, Odo was found adrift in his natural gelatinous state in the Denorios Belt in the Bajoran system. Doctor Mora Pol studied him for seven years, not initially recognising him as a sentient being. Mora and his fellow Bajoran scientists, not sure of what Odo actually was, initially had placed him in a sample container which they labelled "unknown sample". This was translated by their Cardassian supervisors as odo'ital, which literally means "nothing". Doctor Mora was later compelled to recognise Odo's sentience when he copied a beaker on a laboratory table. Even after it became clear that Odo was indeed sentient, the Bajoran scientists kept calling him odo'ital, styling it like a Bajoran name ("Odo Ital").

Later on the story was slowly developed: Over 200 years before, the Changelings' Great Link (a planet in the Gamma Quadrant where Changelings exist in their natural gelatinous form) had sent out 100 Changeling infants in containers throughout the universe in order to see how other alien races react to the presence of Changelings. Other than Odo, of those sent out, three have been accounted for:

- An unnamed Changeling which took the shape of a key in a locket, which ended up in possession of Constable Odo ("Vortex").
- An infant Changeling. Bought by Odo from Quark, Odo tries to teach the infant shapeshifting abilities. However, the infant is dying due to radiation poisoning. It "joins" with Odo so that he can regain his shapeshifting powers ("The Begotten").
- Laas. Over 200 years old, he ended up on the Valara planet where the name "Laas" means "changeable". He left when he realized that he was only being tolerated and would never be accepted. He ended up on Deep Space Nine. He killed a Klingon in self-defense who was going to assault him and, with the help of Major Kira, he escaped. He vows to search the Alpha Quadrant in order to find the other missing "Hundred Changelings" like himself, in order to create a new Great Link ("Chimera").

In a battle with a Changeling spy, Odo ended up killing him and thus breaking the most important rule of the Changelings (no Changeling must ever hurt another). He was punished by being changed by the Great Link into becoming a "solid". He regained his powers in the process of trying to save a dying Changeling. Although his deepest desire is to rejoin the Great Link, he is reluctant to do so due to the mad crusade of the "Female Changeling / Founder" for total war against every solid in the Alpha Quadrant. In the last episode, Odo rejoins the Great Link, saving them from being totally destroyed ("What You Leave Behind").

Odo is tacitly mentioned in the third season of Star Trek: Picard, set two decades after Deep Space Nine, as still being among the Great Link and having informed Worf of a rogue group of Changelings plotting a terrorist attack against the Federation.

In Star Trek: Prodigy, a holographic version of Odo appears in "Kobayashi" as a part of the Enterprise-D bridge crew during Dal R'El's attempts to beat the Kobayashi Maru test. The other crewmembers that Dal selects are former crewmembers of the Enterprise and Enterprise-D.

==== Mirror Universe ====
In the Mirror Universe, Odo is the supervisor of the mining complex at Terok Nor. He is a brutal taskmaster over Terran slaves there and tolerates no deviation from his strict rules. Relatively little is known of him, as no one in the Mirror Universe is aware that the wormhole exists or who Odo's people are. During a mining accident, Odo begins an evacuation of the Terran workers from the complex. Julian Bashir, seizing the opportunity to escape, destroys him with a disruptor.

In this reality, Odo has his own set of rules called the "Rules of Obedience" and quotes one of the rules in the same way that mainstream universe Quark would quote the Ferengi Rules of Acquisition.

After filming of the episode "Crossover", which was mirror Odo's sole onscreen appearance, actor René Auberjonois liked the mirror universe uniform so much he began wearing it while playing the regular universe version of Odo as well.

=== Non-canon ===
==== Novels ====
In the initial Deep Space Nine relaunch novels, Odo is succeeded as security chief by Ro Laren, who is working for the Bajoran Militia. He also sent a Jem'Hadar ambassador to the Alpha Quadrant to foster understanding in the Dominion of other cultures, and soon returned to DS9.

In the Star Trek: Deep Space Nine – Millennium series of novels, it is revealed that Odo rarely shifted into smaller forms such as insects due to a psychological block from his original training under Doctor Mora. The novel series also speculates that the Founders placed a mental block on Odo's abilities to make it difficult for him to alter his face, thus explaining why he can never get faces quite right, even after linking with other Changelings on several occasions.

In the Star Trek: Terok Nor novel Night of the Wolves, Odo was found in a spherical module in the Denorios Belt by the Cardassian vessel Kevalu, which was under the command of Dalin Malyn Ocett, in 2345.

In the Star Trek: Typhon Pact novel Raise the Dawn, Odo returned to the Alpha Quadrant to help Sisko investigate reports that the Typhon Pact, an alliance of the Federation's enemies, have stolen Jem'Hadar technology to perfect their own quantum slipstream drive, only to be trapped in the Alpha Quadrant when the wormhole was seemingly destroyed thanks to Kira's attempt to stop a Typhon Pact ship from using it again. Sisko offered Odo a place on his new ship, the Robinson, but the novel ends with Odo deciding to remain on Bajor for a time to think about what he will do next.

==== Video games ====
The character Odo, with voice acting by René Auberjonois, also appeared in the computer video games Harbinger (1996), The Fallen (2000), and Star Trek Online (2018 expansion).

== Reception ==
In 2009, IGN ranked Odo as the seventh best character of Star Trek overall. They note the character's search for identity, even as he struggles to maintain order on the space station. They highlight his relationships with Sisko, Quark, and Kira on the station, and that he can turn into any shape except a normal human form. In 2016, Odo was ranked as the 15th most important character of Starfleet and related enlisted crews within the Star Trek science fiction universe by Wired magazine.

In 2018, TheWrap ranked Odo as the 8th best main-cast character of Star Trek overall, noting his struggles with loyalties.
