= Geek.com =

Technology news weblog

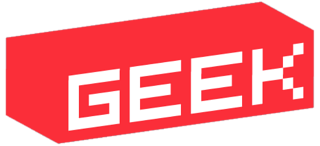
- Website type: Blog
- Owner: Ziff Davis
- Creators: Joel Evans and Rob Hughes
- Editor: Chris Radtke
- Website: www.geek.com
- Commercial: Yes
- Launched: 1996; 30 years ago
- Current status: Hiatus

Geek.com is a technology news weblog about hardware, mobile computing, technology, movies, TV, video games, comic books, and all manner of geek culture subjects. It was founded in 1996 and was run independently until 2007 when it was sold to Name Media, after which it was sold to Geeknet, and then to its current owner, Ziff Davis.

== History ==
The original logo for Geek.com.

Geek.com was founded in 1996 by Joel Evans and Rob Hughes. Joel's brother, Sam Evans, was soon added as the site's chief editor. The site was founded as the Ugeek newsletter but soon became a larger online portal with multiple different sections, including JobGeek, GameGeek, PDAGeek, and ChipGeek. Among the site's many early successes was Ugeek.com's popular Processor Archive.

In March 2007 Geek.com was sold to NameMedia, a company that specializes in domain name reselling and parking. NameMedia had recently acquired Philip Greenspun's photo.net and was building out its Enthusiast Media Network, where Geek.com would be the lead technology site. After the acquisition Rob Hughes and Sam Evans left the site, though co-founder Joel Evans stayed on in his role as Chief Geek. Soon afterwards the site's mobile analyst Matthew "palmsolo" Miller left the site and started writing at ZDnet's Mobile Gadgeteer blog.

In mid-2007 Geek.com underwent a major redesign, moving away from the platform that it had used since 2001, and did away with the subportals, like PDAgeek.

In August 2007 NameMedia acquired XYZcomputing.com a computer hardware website and hired its founder, Sal Cangeloso, to be the site's Senior Editor.

In May 2010 NameMedia sold Geek.com to Geeknet for $1 million. Cangeloso, who had been promoted to Editor-in-Chief when Joel Evans left at the close of 2009 stayed on board in the same position.

The troubled Geeknet sold Geek.com to Ziff Davis at the beginning of January 2011 for an undisclosed amount. Once again Cangeloso stayed on, as did longstanding News Editor, Matthew Humphries.

In 2016, Geek.com was significantly retooled under a new staff, consisting of Editor-in-Chief Chris Radtke, Managing Editor Sheilah Villari, and Senior Editor Jordan Minor. Along with a visual redesign, the site expanded its focus to broader geek culture topics like technology, gaming, movies, TV, and comic books. A new team of freelancers was brought on board to carry out this vision, including YouTube film critic Bob "MovieBob" Chipman.

At the end of 2016, the site hosted a five-hour Facebook "Gifted and Talented Show" made up of sketches and holiday gift suggestions. One notable article, an explanation on the lies surrounding the cartoon Street Sharks, went viral on sites like Vox, The A.V. Club, and Gawker.

As of December 2023, the site was updated to show a message announcing it's "taking a break at the moment". It also links out to three other Ziff Davis brands as recommended alternatives.
