= Deep Space Nine (fictional space station) =

Star Trek space station

Deep Space 9
- Deep Space Nine with the Defiant and other vessels docked
- First appearance: Star Trek: Deep Space Nine: "Emissary" (1993)
- Last appearance: Star Trek: Lower Decks: "Hear All, Trust Nothing" (2022)

Information
- Affiliation: Cardassian Union (formerly, as “Terok Nor”); Bajoran Militia-Starfleet; Dominion (briefly)
- Launched: 2346–2351

General characteristics
- Class: Nor-class; Cardassian Space Station
- Armaments: Circa Early 2370s: 48 rotary-mounted phaser arrays; 36 stationary-mounted phasers; 3 slide-mounted phasers; 48 torpedo launchers; 5,000 photon torpedoes
- Defenses: Deflector shields
- Propulsion: Impulse thrusters
- Mass: 10.1 million metric tons

Deep Space Nine (DS9; previously Terok Nor) is a fictional space station, the eponymous primary setting of the American science fiction television series Star Trek: Deep Space Nine which aired from 1993 to 1999. It serves as a base for the exploration of the Gamma Quadrant via the Bajoran wormhole and is a hub of trade and travel for the sector's denizens. It is run by a joint crew of Starfleet and Bajoran officers and it is the home port of a number of Starfleet runabouts, as well as the starship USS Defiant.

The station is featured in the opening for all 176 episodes of Deep Space Nine, as well as part one of the Star Trek: The Next Generation episode "Birthright", the first Star Trek: Voyager episode "Caretaker", and the Star Trek: Lower Decks episode "Hear All, Trust Nothing". Many story arcs introduced on Next Generation are extended by events that occur on the station. The station builds on the legacy of the Cardassian-Federation interactions introduced by that show and the first episode, "Emissary", includes a visit from the Enterprise-D. Deep Space Nine provides the location for the crew to interact with the characters and elements established by the Star Trek universe, and introduces additional elements.

The station exists in a time and place also occupied by The Next Generation, Voyager, Lower Decks and the seventh through tenth films, the 2370s through early 2380s. This is itself part of the bigger Star Trek universe, which was initiated by the original Star Trek TV show of the late 1960s, created by Gene Roddenberry.

== Description ==
For the show's conceptual design of Deep Space Nine, it is over a kilometer in diameter, is composed of a broad outer docking ring; an inner habitat ring containing residential apartments; and a central core containing the Promenade, the fusion reactors, and the operations center, known as "Ops". Three sets of docking pylons sweep up and down equidistantly around the docking ring, defining an almost spherical shape. It is of identical design to another Cardassian station, Empok Nor. Originally situated in orbit of Bajor, the station was moved in the series' pilot episode to a position at the mouth of the newly discovered wormhole, where it would remain throughout the remainder of the series. This made the station three hours away from Bajor by shuttle, as described in three episodes, although it was mentioned as being five hours away in another episode, (presumably as Bajor was in far orbit of its sun relative to DS9's position). However, it would appear that the journey could be completed in a much shorter length of time if necessary by engaging warp drive within the Bajoran star system.

=== Facilities ===
The Promenade is the main public thoroughfare in which visitors and residents congregate. Common locations on the Promenade depicted or mentioned in Star Trek: Deep Space Nine include Quark's Bar (the crew's most frequently seen off-hours location, which also includes holosuites), the infirmary, the replimat (a self-service replicator eatery), a Bajoran temple, Elim Garak's clothing shop, chief of security Odo's office, a Klingon restaurant, a mineral assay office, a candy kiosk, and, for a brief time during the first season, Keiko O'Brien's classroom. There are normally about 300 permanent residents of the station, though the station can accommodate up to seven thousand.

== Station history ==
In the Star Trek universe, Deep Space Nine was originally a Cardassian mining and refinery station named Terok Nor in orbit around Bajor, and it was built by Bajoran slave labor under Cardassian rule in 2346. The station was commanded by Gul Dukat, the last Cardassian prefect of Bajor. It was abandoned toward the end of the Cardassian occupation of Bajor in 2369; the Cardassians stripped items of value on their way out. The station had some major problems, including a trap left by the Bajoran resistance that nearly killed everyone on the station when it was accidentally activated by the new tenants.

In 2369, the Bajorans assumed control of the station. The Bajoran provisional government requested the assistance of the United Federation of Planets, who renamed it Deep Space Nine (DS9) and placed Commander Benjamin Sisko in command. Despite the Federation's presence, the station remains subject to Bajoran law. Shortly after Sisko assumed command, his crew discovered the Bajoran wormhole. The station was moved to the mouth of the wormhole to secure Bajor's claim to it, after which the station assumed great commercial, scientific and strategic importance.

After the encounter with the Dominion in 2370, in which the Galaxy-class USS Odyssey was destroyed by just three Dominion vessels and owing to other threats, it became obvious that the station's existing occupation-era weapons would be woefully inadequate defending the station. The station's weapons and defensive systems were later heavily upgraded. The upgrades included the installation of multiple rotary torpedo launchers on the docking pylons and weapons sail towers, stowable phaser banks that retract when not in use and improved shields that extend 300 meters around the station. The total torpedo inventory was increased to 5,000.

These upgrades were first used against the Klingons in their offensive against Cardassia in early 2372. At the beginning of the Dominion War in late 2373, the station was temporarily lost to the Dominion. In early 2374, Federation and Klingon forces retook it after the Battle of Bajor.

Aside from a failed Bajoran military coup, the Dominion's occupation, and a brief leave of absence from late 2374 to early 2375, Sisko, promoted to captain in 2371, remained in command of Deep Space Nine. In late 2375, at the end of the Dominion War, Colonel Kira Nerys assumed command. Colonel Kira is still in command when the station is next seen on screen in 2381.

=== Relaunch novels ===
In the continuing story novels, DS9 was forced to jettison its power core due to the actions of Dominion rebels. As one of his first actions as chief of operations of the station, Nog had Empok Nor towed to the station's location, and used its power core as a replacement. The remainder of Empok Nor was broken down for scrap and spare parts.

Later, DS9 would host Bajor's formal acceptance into the Federation. With the station now under Federation law, Quark almost closed down his bar, but remained open after Rom arranged to have it designated as the Ferengi embassy to Bajor, placing it under the jurisdiction of Ferenginar.

In the year 2383, DS9—while under the command of Captain Ro Laren—was destroyed by a series of bombs planted by the Typhon Pact, when an attempt to distract Starfleet from their efforts to discreetly use the wormhole backfires. The station is evacuated. A thousand people are lost of those on the station at the time, none of whom are major characters. In honor of the station, and of the Bajoran people, Starfleet Command and the Federation Council agreed to build a new station in the Bajoran system and name it Deep Space Nine.

== Crew and inhabitants ==
=== Command crew ===
- Benjamin Sisko, Commanding Officer (2369–2375)
- Kira Nerys, First Officer; Bajoran attaché (2369–2375), later Commanding Officer (beginning 2375)
- Constable Odo, Chief of Security (through 2375)
- Worf, Strategic Operations Officer (2371–2375)
- Julian Bashir, Chief Medical Officer (2369–2375)
- Jadzia Dax, Science Officer (2369–2374)
- Ezri Dax, Station Counselor (2375)
- Miles O'Brien, Chief Operations Officer (2369–2375)

=== Other crew ===
- Martok, Klingon attaché (2373–2375)
- Rom, brother of Quark; later an Engineer in the Bajoran militia (2372–2375)
- Nog, son of Rom; later a Starfleet officer (2373–2375)

=== Notable civilian residents ===
- Quark, owner of Quark's, a bar on the Promenade
- Jake Sisko, writer and journalist; son of Benjamin Sisko
- Elim Garak, tailor; former Obsidian Order operative
- Keiko O'Brien, wife of Miles O'Brien; school teacher and botanist
- Morn, one of Quark's recurring customers throughout the series

== Mirror Universe ==
"Terok Nor" is also a space station setting portrayed similarly to Deep Space Nine, except in these episodes it exists in the Mirror Universe, built under the authority of the Klingon-Cardassian Alliance in orbit of Bajor (because in this episode's universe the wormhole is unknown there). In 2370, the station is the setting for the command post of the Alliance authority throughout the Bajoran sector, under the command of Intendant Kira Nerys. The station also serves as a processing center for uridium ore mined from Bajor; the processing facilities are operated by Terran slaves.

In this fictional parallel universe, in 2372, the Terran Rebellion wrests control of the station away from the Alliance. The Alliance, determined to recapture the station, sends a fleet under Regent Worf to fight the rebels. The rebels are able to build their own Defiant, based on schematics for the Defiant in the primary universe, and they use it to defeat the Alliance fleet. Terok Nor remains a base of operations for the Terran Rebellion for at least the next three years.

== Production design ==
The station model was principally designed by Herman Zimmerman and Rick Sternbach. Ricardo Delgado, Joseph Hodges, Nathan Crowley, Jim Martin, Rob Legato, Gary Hutzel, Michael Okuda, and executive producer Rick Berman also contributed to the design. The miniature was fabricated by Tony Meininger.

At a 2006 auction held by the New York City branch of Christie's of London, the original 6' diameter "hero model" of Deep Space 9 went for US$110,000. This was the principal model for filming, and was made primarily of fiber and resin with built in fiber-optic lighting.

Herman Zimmerman compared the design of the station as having Art Deco influences, but also having a geometric design flavour to create a "Cardassian" style. One of the design motifs was to put things in sets of three, such as having three concentric rings for the main station structure, and three sets of vertical pylons.

The interior sets that depicted the station were on the Paramount lot.

== Reception ==
In 2017, Space.com rated the Deep Space Nine as the tenth best spacecraft of the Star Trek franchise.

== See also ==
- Earth Spacedock (another famous Star Trek space station, appeared in various films and television episodes)
- Babylon 5 (fictional space station) (another fictional space station and setting of the 1990s science fiction series Babylon 5)
