= Power Play (Star Trek: The Next Generation) =

- Star Trek: The Next Generation episode
- Episode no.: Season 5 Episode 15
- Directed by: David Livingston
- Story by: Paul Ruben; Maurice Hurley
- Teleplay by: René Balcer; Herbert J. Wright; Brannon Braga
- Production code: 215
- Original air date: February 24, 1992

Guest appearances
- Rosalind Chao - Keiko O'Brien; Colm Meaney - Miles O'Brien; Michelle Forbes - Ro Laren; Ryan Reid - Transporter Technician; Majel Barrett - Computer Voice

Episode chronology
← Previous "Conundrum"	Next → "Ethics"
- Star Trek: The Next Generation season 5

"Power Play" is the 115th episode of the American science fiction television series Star Trek: The Next Generation. It is the 15th episode of the fifth season.

Set in the 24th century, the series follows the adventures of the Starfleet crew of the Federation starship Enterprise-D. In this episode, alien entities take over the minds of Data, Troi, and Miles O'Brien.

The story begins when the spaceship picks up a distress signal, and upon investigation seems to be coming from the USS Essex, a spaceship lost two hundred years earlier.

The episode is noted for having five different writers involved in the story and screenplay.

== Plot ==
The USS Enterprise detects a distress call at a moon known as Mab-Bu VI. Lt. Commander Data discovers that the USS Essex was lost in the region over 200 years ago. Picard sends Riker, Data and Troi to the surface. Riker injures his arm during the shuttle crash. Transporter Chief Miles O'Brien later is able to beam to the planet's surface with a power booster to enable all four to beam back to the Enterprise. Three orbs of light enter the bodies of Data, Troi, and O'Brien, while a fourth refuses to enter the injured Riker.

After returning to the Enterprise, Data, Troi, and O'Brien take control of the ship and take hostages in Ten Forward. Troi claims that she is Captain Bryce Shumar of the Essex, and Data and O'Brien are her crewmates. She claims their spirits were trapped in the electromagnetic fields of the moon and asks that the Enterprise take their bones back to Earth for burial.

Dr. Crusher determines that the pain receptors in Riker's broken arm repelled the entities possessing the others. La Forge, Crusher, and Ro devise a plan to separate the possessive entities from the crew members' bodies by inducing pain then trapping them in a containment field. However the plan fails when Data suddenly moves out of the attack area. Picard suggests Troi, Data and O'Brien relocate to Cargo Bay Four with hostages.

Troi reveals that the moon is a penal colony, and she, Data and O'Brien are in fact prisoners and not crew of the Essex. They had previously attempted to possess the crew on the Essex to escape the colony, but the ship crashed during the attempt. O'Brien transports hundreds of other prisoner entities to Cargo Bay Four to possess the Enterprise crew and escape, but the bridge crew traps them in a containment field. Picard threatens to blow the cargo bay hatch and kill the prisoner entities (and themselves). Troi, Data and O'Brien relinquish their hosts and Worf beams all the entities back to the moon. The crew recover from the experience.

== Casting ==
This episode includes Rosalind Chao playing Keiko, who also appeared in episodes such as "Data's Day", "The Wounded", "Disaster", and went on to have a recurring guest role in Star Trek Deep: Space Nine. It also includes Patricia Tallman in a supporting role as an unnamed security officer.

== Reception ==
In 2011, The A.V. Club gave this episode a B− grade, suggesting it was "pretty good but not great". Keith DeCandido of Tor.com gave the episode a 7 out of 10 rating.

In 2013, it was described as "rousing action yarn" with "delightfully malevolent " acting performances by the cast in the book Star Trek FAQ 2.0 (Unofficial and Unauthorized): Everything Left to Know About the Next Generation, the Movies, and Beyond. They praised it as one of the most exciting episodes of the season, bringing together adventuresome writing with good acting.

== Releases ==
The episode was released in the United States on November 5, 2002, as part of the season five DVD box set. The first Blu-ray release was in the United States on November 18, 2013, followed by the United Kingdom the next day, November 19, 2013.
