= Looking for par'Mach in All the Wrong Places =

- Star Trek: Deep Space Nine episode
- Episode no.: Season 5 Episode 3
- Directed by: Andrew J. Robinson
- Written by: Ronald D. Moore
- Production code: 501
- Original air date: October 14, 1996

Guest appearances
- Rosalind Chao as Keiko; Mary Kay Adams as Grilka; Joseph Ruskin as Tumek; Phil Morris as Thopok

Episode chronology
← Previous "The Ship"	Next → "...Nor the Battle to the Strong"
- Star Trek: Deep Space Nine season 5

"Looking for par'Mach in All the Wrong Places" is the third episode of the fifth season of the American science fiction television series Star Trek: Deep Space Nine, originally airing on October 14, 1996 in broadcast syndication. The story was written by Ronald D. Moore and directed by actor Andrew J. Robinson, who played the recurring character Garak. The episode received a Nielsen rating of 5.7 percent, a slight decrease from the previous week.

Set in the 24th century, the series follows the adventures on Deep Space Nine, a space station located near a stable wormhole between the Alpha and Gamma quadrants of the Milky Way Galaxy. In the episode, Worf (Michael Dorn) becomes infatuated with Grilka, but is unable to pursue her as a result of his dishonor among Klingons. In an adaption of the 19th-century play Cyrano de Bergerac, Worf instead helps Quark (Armin Shimerman) win Grilka's love. When Quark—wholly inexperienced in Klingon fighting and mating rituals—is forced to fight Grilka's bodyguard to legitimize their relationship, Worf employs a device to remotely control Quark's body movements in combat, enabling him to defeat his opponent. Jadzia Dax (Terry Farrell) attempts to console the dejected Worf, and becomes the aggressor in a romantic scene between the two. It is explained in the episode that "par'Mach" is the Klingon word for "love", with an aggressive connotation.

"Looking for par'Mach in All the Wrong Places" has been met with mixed critical reception.

== Plot ==
Grilka (Mary Kay Adams), the Klingon ex-wife of Quark (Armin Shimerman) from a "marriage of convenience" (see "The House of Quark"), arrives at Deep Space Nine to seek financial advice from Quark. Worf (Michael Dorn) is immediately attracted to her, but is told by her adviser, Tumek, that Worf's dishonor precludes her from mating with him. Quark wishes to pursue Grilka romantically, but is ignorant of Klingon mating rituals, so he asks Jadzia Dax (Terry Farrell) for help. Worf, eager to prove himself capable of courting a Klingon woman, joins Dax in coaching Quark to win Grilka's affections. Through diligent efforts to learn Klingon culture, Quark is successful with Grilka; her bodyguard, Thopok (Phil Morris), becomes outraged at the unconventional relationship and challenges Quark to a duel.

Unskilled at combat, Quark stands to either lose Grilka or be killed. Worf helps him using a device that enables him to control Quark's body movements from an adjacent room to help Quark defend himself in the duel. Although the device temporarily malfunctions, he defeats the bodyguard. The scene concludes with Grilka and Quark alone and enamored with one another. Worf opines to Jadzia that Quark is unworthy of such a great Klingon woman and she counters that Worf's interest in Grilka is superficial, and there are better options awaiting him. Since Worf still fails to notice her hints, Dax initiates an aggressive romantic encounter. Worf is surprised but responds. In the final scene, both couples are in the infirmary; Doctor Julian Bashir (Alexander Siddig) deduces the source of their injuries. Dax and Worf decide to begin a relationship.

In a subplot, Miles O'Brien (Colm Meaney) is faced with the increasingly uncomfortable situation of Major Kira Nerys (Nana Visitor) carrying his baby and living with him and his wife, Keiko (Rosalind Chao) (see "Body Parts"). Miles and Kira begin to feel attracted to each other, but try to avoid growing closer; Kira decides to take a trip to Bajor for a few days only for Keiko to insist that Miles accompany her on her retreat. As the runabout is about to depart, Kira reveals that their destination is in a highly romantic setting, which prompts Miles to back out of the trip.

== Production and themes ==
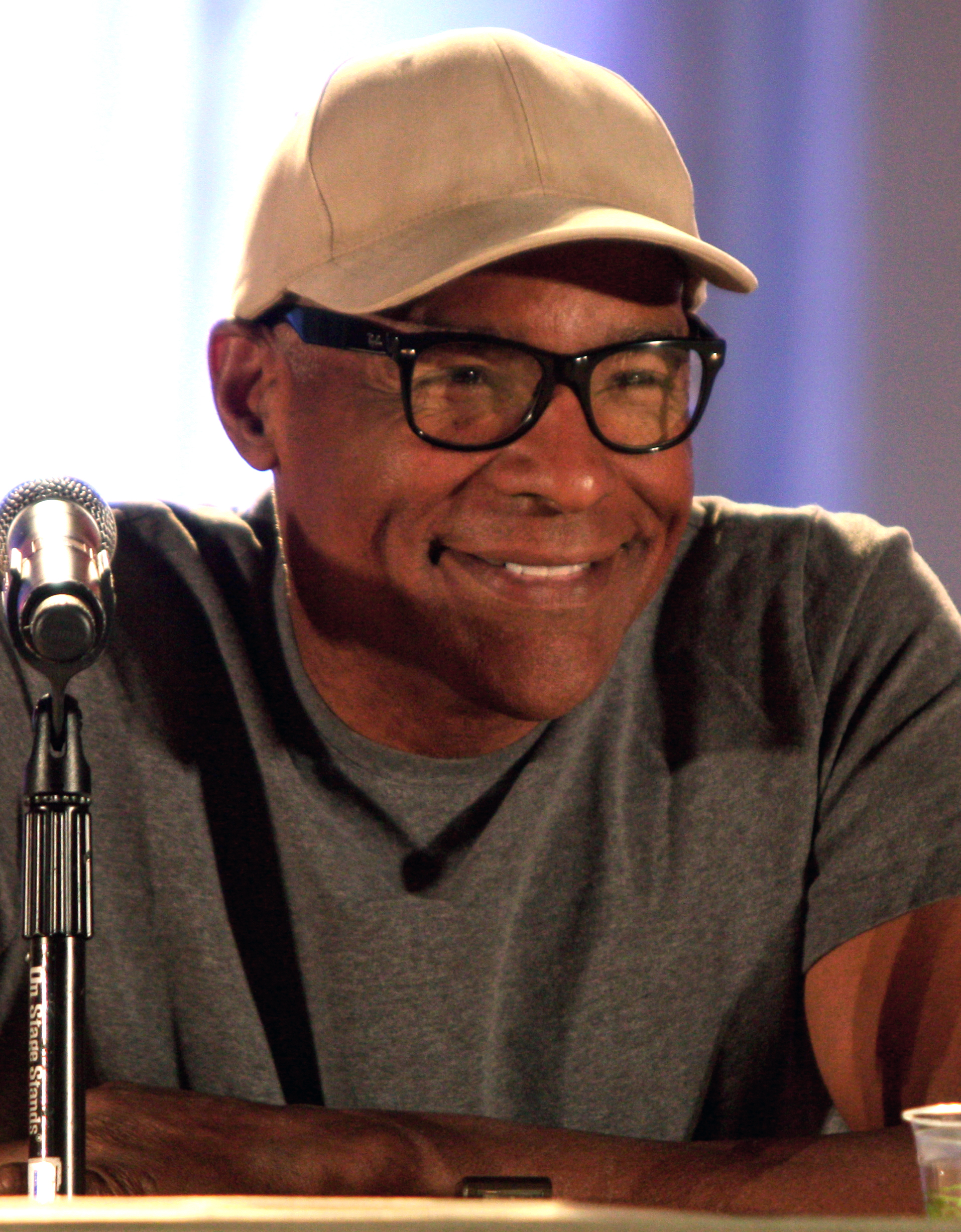
Actor Michael Dorn, who portrays Worf, suggested the adaptation of Cyrano de Bergerac for an episode.

The episode boasts the longest title of the series and, as of 2015, the second-longest of all Star Trek television installments, behind "For the World Is Hollow and I Have Touched the Sky" of the 1960s series. "Looking for par'Mach in All the Wrong Places" drew inspiration from the 1897 play Cyrano de Bergerac, in which a brilliant Frenchman, resigned to the fact that the woman he adores will never be able to look past his distractingly large nose, helps another man win the lady's heart by dictating beautiful language from nearby. The idea for a modern adaption of Cyrano de Bergerac was proposed by Michael Dorn. "Looking for par'Mach in All the Wrong Places" was directed by Andrew Robinson, who plays the Cardassian Elim Garak on Star Trek: Deep Space Nine. This marked the first time that the actor of a recurring (but not main) Star Trek character had directed an episode in the franchise. Having just received two Los Angeles Drama Critics Circle Awards for theatrical directing, Robinson personally asked executive producer Rick Berman to let him direct an episode of Deep Space Nine; Robinson was pleased to have been assigned this particular episode.

Challenged with inventing an original way for Quark to survive the fight without directly paralleling prior material, writers devised a "holographic puppeteer" system. Worf is seen wearing a headset which allows him to control the body movements of Quark, who is wearing a concealed receiver. It is not made clear how the "virtual control device" works. Indeed, Ronald D. Moore clarified: "I wasn't interested in explaining it to the viewers. We just buy the premise and move on." However, science consultant André Bormanis agreed that the "web of sensors and actuators" was conceptually sound. Dan Curry, who originally designed the bat'leth and helped developed Klingon fighting techniques, was instrumental in choreographing the combat scene between Quark and Thopok. Despite his character's apparent ineptitude at hand-to-hand combat, Shimerman practiced extensively with a bat'leth to make Worf's influence over Quark seem convincing. Shimerman also enlisted the help of a mime artist to improve his technique.

Guest star Joseph Ruskin played Tumek in "Looking for par'Mach in All the Wrong Places", and had previously appeared in the Star Trek: The Original Series episode "The Gamesters of Triskelion" as well as earlier in Deep Space Nine in "Improbable Cause". He went on to appear both in the film Star Trek: Insurrection and the Star Trek: Voyager episode "Gravity".

== Reception ==
"Looking for par'Mach in All the Wrong Places" was first broadcast on October 14, 1996 in broadcast syndication. It received a Nielsen rating of 5.7 percent, placing it ninth in its timeslot. This represented a slight decrease in viewership from the previous week; "The Ship" garnered a rating of 6.0 percent. In contrast, "Trials and Tribble-ations" was the most-watched episode of the season, with a rating of 7.7 percent.

Several reviewers re-watched the episode after the end of the series. Zack Handlen reviewed the episode for The A.V. Club in April 2013. Handlen remarked on the episode's farcical title and content, noting that the script was largely without substance. He granted that the episode served as a welcome change of pace from the ongoing "agonies of war" in the series. He notes that the main plot involving Grilka was "wafer thin" but nonetheless effective in creating humor and introducing the relationship between Dax and Worf. Still, Handlen thought Worf's strong attraction to Grilka lacked sufficient justification, given Worf's long-standing desire to maintain solitude on the station. In addition, Handlen disliked the subplot concerning Miles O'Brien and Major Kira, suggesting that the romantic tension between the two was forced and inconsistent with their personalities.

For the website TrekNation, Michelle Erica Green wrote that she strongly disliked the episode and considered some of its sexual implications "repulsive". She felt the episode inappropriately objectified its female characters—having depicted both Quark and Worf as "players"—and that Worf had neglected to discuss with Dax the risks inherent to Klingon sex rituals. Green was somewhat more receptive to the O'Brien/Kira storyline, and was fond of the portrayal of pregnancy. Jamahl Epsicokhan of Jammer's Reviews praised the episode as being among the show's "most purely amusing", while acknowledging the weak plot. Epsicokhan enjoyed Quark's interactions with other characters, which were rare in that Quark had other motives than his usual lust for monetary profit. Unlike Handlen, Epsicokhan liked the Kira and O'Brien scenes, especially near the episode's close when the characters were set to depart for Bajor. He gave the episode a score of three out of four stars. Science fiction writer Keith DeCandido reviewed "Looking for par'Mach in All the Wrong Places" for Tor.com, lauding Ronald D. Moore's sense of humor on display in the episode, as well as the performances by Nana Visitor and Colm Meaney. In contrast with some other reviewers, DeCandido thought the story stayed true to all involved characters.

In 2017, Vulture listed this episode as one of the best of Star Trek: Deep Space Nine.

== Home media ==
The first home media release of "Looking for par'Mach in All the Wrong Places" was part of a two-episode VHS cassette alongside "...Nor the Battle to the Strong" in the United Kingdom on October 1, 1999. In the United States and Canada, this was followed by a single-episode release on July 10, 2001. It was later released on DVD as part of the season 5 box set on October 7, 2003.
