= Afterimage (Star Trek: Deep Space Nine) =

- Star Trek: Deep Space Nine episode
- Episode no.: Season 7 Episode 3
- Directed by: Les Landau
- Written by: René Echevarria
- Production code: 553
- Original air date: October 12, 1998

Guest appearances
- Andrew Robinson - Elim Garak; Mark Allen Shepherd - Morn

Episode chronology
← Previous "Shadows and Symbols"	Next → "Take Me Out to the Holosuite"
- Star Trek: Deep Space Nine season 7

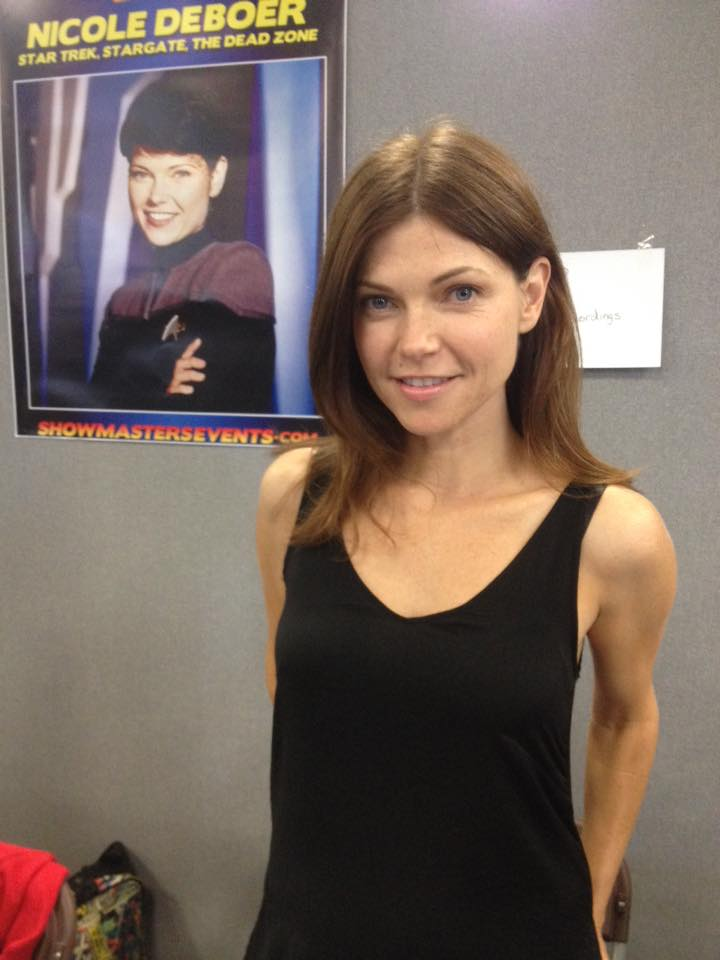
"Afterimage" features Nicole de Boer (here at 2015 London Film and Comic Con), as her new main-cast character Ezri Dax starts to blend in with the DS9 crew

"Afterimage" is the 153rd episode of the television series Star Trek: Deep Space Nine, the third episode of the seventh season, written by René Echevarria and directed by Les Landau. It was first broadcast the week of October 12, 1998, receiving Nielsen ratings of 4.3 points corresponding to about 4.3 million viewers.

Set in the 24th century, the series follows the adventures of the crew of the Starfleet-managed Bajoran space station Deep Space Nine. The later seasons of the series follow a war between the United Federation of Planets and an expansionist empire known as the Dominion, which has already absorbed the nearby planet of Cardassia. This episode is the first to focus on the new character Ezri Dax (played by Nicole de Boer), who was introduced in the first episode of the seventh season. A member of the Trill species, Ezri is the new host for the symbiotic lifeform previously carried by main character Jadzia Dax; Jadzia was killed at the end of the sixth season to make way for actress Terry Farrell to depart the show, and the Ezri character was written to replace her.

In this episode, Ezri struggles to adapt to being joined to a being with many lifetimes of memories and experience, while Jadzia's friends and her husband Worf are disconcerted by the presence of a new Dax in their lives. Meanwhile, the Cardassian spy-turned-tailor Elim Garak is suffering from panic attacks due to claustrophobia, and Ezri, who is in training to be a therapist, is assigned to treat him.

== Plot ==
In addition to coping with the memories of her symbiont's past lives, Ezri must deal with the range of reactions generated by her presence on Deep Space Nine. Captain Benjamin Sisko offers her a permanent job on the station, but she is reluctant to accept it due to the awkwardness of her interactions with Jadzia's friends—especially Jadzia's husband Worf, who refuses to speak to her and threatens Julian Bashir after Bashir chats with her over lunch.

Garak, who has been working on decoding encrypted Cardassian communications to aid the Federation war effort, has been suffering acute panic attacks from claustrophobia; Sisko asks Ezri to try to help him. Their first meeting seems to go well, but soon his claustrophobia has gotten so bad that he is found in an airlock attempting to eject himself into outer space. At a later meeting, Garak derides Ezri as a "confused child" and an unworthy successor to Jadzia, and she leaves in tears. She tells Sisko she wants to resign from Starfleet, and he berates her for wasting the symbiont's life.

Ezri returns to Garak's shop to apologize to him, and tells him about the good his work has done for the war effort. The ensuing conversation reveals the real reason for Garak's panic attacks: although he believes that defeating the Dominion is necessary for the good of Cardassia, he feels he has betrayed his people by aiding the Federation to defeat Cardassians in battle. Having helped Garak deal with his conflicted emotions, Ezri decides to remain in Starfleet. Sisko admits that he berated Ezri only as a reverse-psychology method to get her to prove herself—a tactic Jadzia had used on him before. He still holds out the offer for her to stay on DS9.

Meanwhile, Worf confides in his friend Miles O'Brien that he believes that it dishonors Jadzia's memory for her friends to treat Ezri as the same person as Jadzia; but O'Brien retorts that it is treating her like a stranger that dishonors Jadzia. Worf visits Ezri to apologize to her, and tells her that she should not turn down Sisko's job offer on his account. Ezri accepts the position, and is promoted to the rank of lieutenant.

== Reception ==
Zack Handlen of The A.V. Club said it was a "gratifyingly solid" episode that established Ezri's place on DS9, added to our understanding of Garak, and gave us insight into "how complicated and difficult these characters' lives will always be". In 2015, Keith R.A. DeCandido reviewed the episode for Tor.com. He rated it 3 out of 10, commenting "This is almost a good episode. It certainly tries really hard, and starts out promising. Garak’s issues and Dax’s dovetail nicely," but was unhappy with the conclusion; he found it difficult adjusting to Ezri after the departure of Jadzia from the show.

In 2018, Nick Cavicchio, reviewing the episode for ScienceFiction.com, described it as arguably the most important episode in the seventh season aside from the finale, as it has the function of establishing a new character in the main cast and defining her relationships with the other characters. He also praised Andrew Robinson's performance as Garak.

Michelle Erica Green, reviewing the episode for TrekToday, called the episode "contrived yet effective". She wrote that Nicole de Boer was able to establish Ezri as an effective character, despite the difficulty of replacing a character who had been on the show for 6 years, but found Garak's storyline "annoying".
