= The Ship (Star Trek: Deep Space Nine) =

- Star Trek: Deep Space Nine episode
- Episode no.: Season 5 Episode 2
- Directed by: Kim Friedman
- Story by: Pam Wigginton; Rick Cason
- Teleplay by: Hans Beimler
- Production code: 500
- Original air date: October 7, 1996

Guest appearances
- Kaitlin Hopkins as Kilana; F. J. Rio as Enrique Muñiz; Hilary Shepard as Hoya; Ken Lesco as T'Lor

Episode chronology
← Previous "Apocalypse Rising"	Next → "Looking for par'Mach in All the Wrong Places"
- Star Trek: Deep Space Nine season 5

"The Ship" is the 100th episode overall of the television series Star Trek: Deep Space Nine, and the second episode of the fifth season. This episode aired on syndicated television on October 7, 1996. It was written by Hans Beimler, Pam Wigginton and Rick Cason, and it was directed by Kim Friedman.

Set in the 24th century, the series follows the adventures of the crew of the Starfleet-managed space station Deep Space Nine, adjacent to a wormhole leading to the distant Gamma Quadrant of the galaxy. Later seasons of the show follow the conflict between the United Federation of Planets and a hostile empire from the Gamma Quadrant known as the Dominion, ruled by the shape-shifting Changelings. In this episode, the Deep Space Nine crew comes into conflict with the Dominion's genetically-engineered soldiers, the Jem'Hadar, when trying to salvage a crashed Jem'Hadar ship.

Guest stars in this episode include Kaitlin Hopkins as Kilana and F. J. Rio as Muñiz.

== Plot ==
An away-team of Deep Space Nine crew, led by Captain Benjamin Sisko, are conducting a mineral survey on an uninhabited Gamma Quadrant planet, while their runabout awaits them in orbit. A Dominion warship crashes near their location; investigating, they find the crew dead. Sisko contacts DS9 to have the USS Defiant come tow the ship back to the station so that it can be studied.

Another Dominion ship arrives, destroys the runabout and its crew, and transports a number of Jem'Hadar soldiers to the surface along with their Vorta supervisor, Kilana. The soldiers fire on the away team, killing one and wounding Muñiz, an assistant to chief engineer O'Brien. Sisko's crew flees into the crashed ship for protection. Muñiz begins slowly bleeding to death as a result of his injury.

Kilana meets with Sisko, offering to return the away team safely to DS9 if they yield the ship. Meanwhile, a Jem'Hadar transports onto the crashed ship and attacks the team; Muñiz, though weakened, is able to shoot the Jem'Hadar. Kilana and Sisko immediately return to their ships. Sisko deduces that there is something valuable aboard that they are unwilling to risk damaging in a direct attack. He rejects a new offer from Kilana to allow Sisko to keep the ship if he permits the Jem'Hadar to retrieve an item from it.

O'Brien tries to assure a now delirious Muñiz that he will live, but Lt. Cmdr. Worf asserts that Muñiz should be prepared for death. Tempers flare and a fight almost breaks out. Sisko sternly orders the crew to pull themselves together. O'Brien's attempt to bring the ship's engines online fails, and Muñiz dies.

The ship's precious cargo finally reveals itself: a dying Changeling, one of the Founders of the Dominion whom the Jem'Hadar and Vorta revere as gods. After it dies, Kilana transports to the vessel. She explains that her Jem'Hadar have committed suicide for allowing the death of a Founder, and that she has no further means to prevent Starfleet from salvaging the ship. Sisko allows her to collect some of the Changeling's remains before she leaves.

The Defiant eventually arrives and tows the ship back to DS9. O'Brien and Worf hold a vigil over Muñiz's casket. Sisko tries to write a report for Starfleet, but keeps lingering on the five crewmen who died on the mission. Despite knowing the ship's recovery could save thousands of lives, Sisko still feels they deserved more than to die on an isolated planet so far from home.

== Reception ==
Zack Handlen of The A.V. Club praised this episode for being very different from the previous episode "without any real issues of tonal whiplash."

In 2015, Geek.com recommended this episode as "essential watching" for their abbreviated Star Trek: Deep Space Nine binge-watching guide.
