= List of Beverly Hills, 90210 episodes =

Primetime teen drama 1990 - 2000

Beverly Hills, 90210 is a United States primetime teen drama which ran on the Fox network for 9 years, from October 4, 1990, to May 17, 2000. The series lasted for 293 episodes and 11 specials. Note that the original pilot, which subsequently has aired, is not the original pilot of the show which did air.

== Series overview ==
Beverly Hills, 90210 series overview
| Season | Episodes | Originally released | |
| Season | Episodes | First released | Last released |
|---|---|---|---|
| 1 | 22 | October 4, 1990 | May 9, 1991 |
| 2 | 28 | July 11, 1991 | May 7, 1992 |
| 3 | 30 | July 15, 1992 | May 19, 1993 |
| 4 | 32 | September 8, 1993 | May 25, 1994 |
| 5 | 32 | September 7, 1994 | May 24, 1995 |
| 6 | 32 | September 13, 1995 | May 22, 1996 |
| 7 | 32 | August 21, 1996 | May 21, 1997 |
| 8 | 32 | September 10, 1997 | May 20, 1998 |
| 9 | 26 | September 16, 1998 | May 19, 1999 |
| 10 | 27 | September 8, 1999 | May 17, 2000 |

== Episodes ==
=== Season 1 (1990–1991) ===
| No. overall | No. in season | Title | Directed by | Written by | Original release date | Prod. code | U.S. viewers (millions) |
|---|---|---|---|---|---|---|---|
| 1 | 1 | "Class of Beverly Hills" | Tim Hunter | Darren Star | October 4, 1990 | – | 11.0 |
| 2 | 2 | "The Green Room" | Michael Uno | David Stenn | October 11, 1990 | 2190001 | 10.2 |
| 3 | 3 | "Every Dream Has Its Price (Tag)" | Catlin Adams | Amy Spies | October 18, 1990 | 2190002 | 7.8 |
| 4 | 4 | "The First Time" | Bethany Rooney | Darren Star | October 25, 1990 | 2190003 | 7.6 |
| 5 | 5 | "One on One" | Artie Mandelberg | Charles Rosin | November 1, 1990 | 2190004 | 8.1 |
| 6 | 6 | "Higher Education" | Artie Mandelberg | Jordan Budde | November 15, 1990 | 2190005 | 7.6 |
| 7 | 7 | "Perfect Mom" | Bethany Rooney | Darren Star | November 22, 1990 | 2190006 | 6.6 |
| 8 | 8 | "The 17 Year Itch" | Jefferson Kibbee | Amy Spies | November 29, 1990 | 2190007 | 6.2 |
| 9 | 9 | "The Gentle Art of Listening" | Dan Attias | Charles Rosin | December 6, 1990 | 2190008 | 8.0 |
| 10 | 10 | "Isn't it Romantic?" | Nancy Malone | Karen Rosin | January 3, 1991 | 2190009 | 7.7 |
| 11 | 11 | "B.Y.O.B." | Miles Watkins | Jordan Budde | January 10, 1991 | 2190010 | 9.1 |
| 12 | 12 | "One Man and a Baby" | Burt Brinckerhoff | Darren Star & Amy Spies | January 24, 1991 | 2190011 | 9.9 |
| 13 | 13 | "Slumber Party" | Charles Braverman | Darren Star | January 31, 1991 | 2190012 | 11.0 |
| 14 | 14 | "East Side Story" | Dan Attias | Story by : Carmen Sternwood & Charles Rosin; Teleplay by : Charles Rosin | February 14, 1991 | 2190013 | 9.9 |
| 15 | 15 | "A Fling in Palm Springs" | Jefferson Kibbee | Jordan Budde | February 21, 1991 | 2190014 | 10.3 |
| 16 | 16 | "Fame is Where You Find It" | Paul Schneider | Charles Rosin & Karen Rosin | February 28, 1991 | 2190015 | 10.0 |
| 17 | 17 | "Stand (Up) and Deliver" | Burt Brinckerhoff | Amy Spies | March 7, 1991 | 2190016 | 9.5 |
| 18 | 18 | "It's Only a Test" | Charles Braverman | Darren Star | March 28, 1991 | 2190017 | 12.8 |
| 19 | 19 | "April is the Cruelest Month" | Dan Attias | Steve Wasserman & Jessica Klein | April 11, 1991 | 2190018 | 11.3 |
| 20 | 20 | "Spring Training" | Burt Brinckerhoff | Charles Rosin | April 25, 1991 | 2190019 | 10.5 |
| 21 | 21 | "Spring Dance" | Darren Star | Darren Star | May 2, 1991 | 2190020 | 12.9 |
| 22 | 22 | "Home Again" | Charles Braverman | Amy Spies | May 9, 1991 | 2190021 | 15.0 |

=== Season 2 (1991–1992) ===
| No. overall | No. in season | Title | Directed by | Written by | Original release date | Prod. code | U.S. viewers (millions) |
|---|---|---|---|---|---|---|---|
| 23 | 1 | "Beach Blanket Brandon" | Charles Braverman | Darren Star | July 11, 1991 | 2191022 | 19.1 |
| 24 | 2 | "The Party Fish" | Daniel Attias | Charles Rosin | July 18, 1991 | 2191023 | 16.0 |
| 25 | 3 | "Summer Storm" | Charles Braverman | Steve Wasserman & Jessica Klein | July 25, 1991 | 2191024 | 18.1 |
| 26 | 4 | "Anaconda" | Daniel Attias | Jonathan Roberts | August 1, 1991 | 2191025 | 15.4 |
| 27 | 5 | "Play it Again, David" | Charles Braverman | Sherri Ziff | August 8, 1991 | 2191026 | 17.4 |
| 28 | 6 | "Pass/Not Pass" | Jefferson Kibbee | Allison Adler | August 15, 1991 | 2191027 | 16.1 |
| 29 | 7 | "Camping Trip" | Jeff Melman | Karen Rosin | August 29, 1991 | 2191028 | 17.0 |
| 30 | 8 | "Wild Fire" | Daniel Attias | Steve Wasserman & Jessica Klein | September 12, 1991 | 2191029 | 17.7 |
| 31 | 9 | "Ashes to Ashes" | Charles Braverman | Charles Rosin & Judi Ann Mason | September 19, 1991 | 2191030 | 19.0 |
| 32 | 10 | "Necessity is a Mother" | Jefferson Kibbee | Steve Wasserman & Jessica Klein | September 26, 1991 | 2191031 | 16.5 |
| 33 | 11 | "Leading from the Heart" | Daniel Attias | Darren Star | October 10, 1991 | 2191032 | 15.9 |
| 34 | 12 | "Down and Out (of District) in Beverly Hills" | Charles Braverman | Story by : Karen Rosin & Allison Adler; Teleplay by : Karen Rosin | October 17, 1991 | 2191033 | 15.0 |
| 35 | 13 | "Halloween" | Michael Katleman | Jonathan Roberts | October 31, 1991 | 2191034 | 16.6 |
| 36 | 14 | "The Next 50 Years" | Daniel Attias | Karen Rosin & Charles Rosin | November 7, 1991 | 2191035 | 22.3 |
| 37 | 15 | "U4EA" | Charles Braverman | Allison Adler | November 14, 1991 | 2191036 | 20.8 |
| 38 | 16 | "My Desperate Valentine" | Jeff Melman | Michael Swerdlick | November 21, 1991 | 2191037 | 28.7 |
| 39 | 17 | "Chuckie's Back" | Bradley Gross | Story by : Steve Wasserman & Jessica Klein & Michael Swerdlick; Teleplay by : Steve Wasserman & Jessica Klein | December 12, 1991 | 2191038 | 18.2 |
| 40 | 18 | "A Walsh Family Christmas" | Darren Star | Darren Star | December 19, 1991 | 2191039 | 22.6 |
| 41 | 19 | "Fire and Ice" | Jeff Melman | Carl Sautter | January 9, 1992 | 2191040 | 19.6 |
| 42 | 20 | "A Competitive Edge" | David Carson | Story by : Douglas Brooks West; Teleplay by : Charles Rosin & Jonathan Roberts | January 23, 1992 | 2191042 | 18.7 |
| 43 | 21 | "Everybody's Talkin' 'Bout It" | Daniel Attias | Karen Rosin & Charles Rosin | February 6, 1992 | 2191043 | 19.0 |
| 44 | 22 | "And Baby Makes Five" | Bill D'Elia | Steve Wasserman & Jessica Klein | February 13, 1992 | 2191044 | 16.7 |
| 45 | 23 | "Cardio-Funk" | Daniel Attias | Steve Wasserman & Jessica Klein | February 27, 1992 | 2191041 | 21.3 |
| 46 | 24 | "The Pit and the Pendulum" | Daniel Attias | Larry Barber & Paul Barber | March 19, 1992 | 2191045 | 17.2 |
| 47 | 25 | "Meeting Mr. Pony" | Bradley Gross | Story by : Jonathan Lemkin; Teleplay by : Darren Star & Charles Rosin & Karen Rosin & Jonathan Lemkin | April 2, 1992 | 2191046 | 20.9 |
| 48 | 26 | "Things to Do on a Rainy Day" | Bethany Rooney | Jonathan Roberts & Maria Semple | April 23, 1992 | 2191047 | 19.5 |
| 49 | 27 | "Mexican Standoff" | Bradley Gross | Steve Wasserman & Jessica Klein | April 30, 1992 | 2191048 | 15.8 |
| 50 | 28 | "Wedding Bell Blues" | Charles Braverman | Darren Star | May 7, 1992 | 2191049 | 21.4 |

=== Season 3 (1992–1993) ===
| No. overall | No. in season | Title | Directed by | Written by | Original release date | Prod. code | U.S. viewers (millions) |
|---|---|---|---|---|---|---|---|
| 51 | 1 | "Misery Loves Company" | Jeffrey Melman | Steve Wasserman & Jessica Klein | July 15, 1992 | 2192050 | 16.7 |
| 52 | 2 | "The Twins, the Trustee, and the Very Big Trip" | David Carson | Charles Rosin | July 22, 1992 | 2192051 | 15.8 |
| 53 | 3 | "Too Little, Too Late/Paris 75001" | Daniel Attias | Maria Semple & Jonathan Roberts (Too Little, Too Late); Karen Rosin (Paris 75001) | July 29, 1992 | 2192052 | 13.2 |
| 54 | 4 | "Sex, Lies and Volleyball/Photo Fini" | Jeffrey Melman | Chris Brancato & Kenneth Biller (Sex, Lies and Volleyball); Karen Rosin (Photo Fini) | August 5, 1992 | 2192053 | 13.2 |
| 55 | 5 | "Shooting Star/American in Paris" | Daniel Attias | Steve Wasserman & Jessica Klein (Shooting Star); Karen Rosin (American in Paris) | August 12, 1992 | 2192054 | 16.2 |
| 56 | 6 | "Castles in the Sand" | Paul Lazarus | Ann Donahue | August 19, 1992 | 2192055 | 17.1 |
| 57 | 7 | "A Song of Myself" | Jeffrey Melman | Chris Brancato & Kenneth Biller | September 9, 1992 | 2192056 | 16.6 |
| 58 | 8 | "The Back Story" | Bradley M. Gross | Karen Rosin | September 16, 1992 | 2192057 | 14.3 |
| 59 | 9 | "Highwire" | Bethany Rooney | Star Frohman | September 23, 1992 | 2192058 | 16.2 |
| 60 | 10 | "Home and Away" | Jack Bender | Chip Johannessen | October 7, 1992 | 2192059 | 15.6 |
| 61 | 11 | "A Presumption of Innocence" | Bethany Rooney | Karen Rosin | October 21, 1992 | 2192060 | 16.4 |
| 62 | 12 | "Destiny Rides Again" | Christopher Hibler | Steve Wasserman & Jessica Klein | November 4, 1992 | 2192061 | 19.9 |
| 63 | 13 | "Rebel with a Cause" | Daniel Attias | Star Frohman | November 11, 1992 | 2192062 | 19.7 |
| 64 | 14 | "Wild Horses" | Bobby Roth | Chris Brancato & Kenneth Biller | November 18, 1992 | 2192063 | 16.9 |
| 65 | 15 | "The Kindness of Strangers" | Richard Lang | Steve Wasserman & Jessica Klein | November 25, 1992 | 2192064 | 16.2 |
| 66 | 16 | "It's a Totally Happening Life" | Richard Lang | Karen Rosin & Charles Rosin | December 16, 1992 | 2192066 | 15.8 |
| 67 | 17 | "The Game Is Chicken" | Jack Bender | Chip Johannessen | January 6, 1993 | 2192065 | 16.2 |
| 68 | 18 | "Midlife... Now What?" | Robert Becker | Lana Freistat Melman | January 13, 1993 | 2192067 | 16.6 |
| 69 | 19 | "Back in the High Life Again" | Bill D'Elia | Steve Wasserman & Jessica Klein | January 27, 1993 | 2192068 | N/A |
| 70 | 20 | "Parental Guidance Recommended" | Gwen Arner | Chip Johannessen | February 3, 1993 | 2192069 | 16.6 |
| 71 | 21 | "Dead End" | Jeff Melman | Star Frohman | February 10, 1993 | 2192070 | 19.7 |
| 72 | 22 | "The Child Is Father to the Man" | James Whitmore Jr. | Karen Rosin & Charles Rosin | February 17, 1993 | 2192071 | 18.7 |
| 73 | 23 | "Duke's Bad Boy" | Robert Becker | Jessica Klein | March 3, 1993 | 2192072 | 16.0 |
| 74 | 24 | "Perfectly Perfect" | Bethany Rooney | Gillian Horvath | March 24, 1993 | 2192073 | 19.1 |
| 75 | 25 | "Senior Poll" | Christopher Hibler | Chip Johannessen | April 7, 1993 | 2192074 | 15.0 |
| 76 | 26 | "She Came in Through the Bathroom Window" | Jason Priestley | Ken Stringer | April 28, 1993 | 2192075 | 14.4 |
| 77 | 27 | "A Night to Remember" | Richard Lang | Steve Wasserman & Jessica Klein | May 5, 1993 | 2192076 | 17.0 |
| 78 | 28 | "Something in the Air" | James Whitmore Jr. | Steve Wasserman & Jessica Klein | May 12, 1993 | 2192077 | 16.9 |
| 79 | 29 | "Commencement" | Daniel Attias | Karen & Charles Rosin | May 19, 1993 | 2192078A | 22.2 |
| 80 | 30 | "Commencement" | Daniel Attias | Karen & Charles Rosin | May 19, 1993 | 2192078B | 22.2 |

=== Season 4 (1993–1994) ===
| No. overall | No. in season | Title | Directed by | Written by | Original release date | Prod. code | U.S. viewers (millions) |
|---|---|---|---|---|---|---|---|
| 81 | 1 | "So Long, Farewell, Auf Wiedersehen, Goodbye" | Bill D'Elia | Charles Rosin | September 8, 1993 | 2193079 | 18.1 |
| 82 | 2 | "The Girl from New York City" | Jeffrey Melman | Steve Wasserman & Jessica Klein | September 15, 1993 | 2193080 | 15.1 |
| 83 | 3 | "The Little Fish" | Gilbert M. Shilton | Larry Mollin | September 22, 1993 | 2193081 | 15.5 |
| 84 | 4 | "Greek to Me" | Bethany Rooney | Chip Johannessen | September 29, 1993 | 2193082 | 13.9 |
| 85 | 5 | "Radio Daze" | Richard Lang | Richard Gollance | October 6, 1993 | 2193083 | 14.4 |
| 86 | 6 | "Strangers in the Night" | James Eckhouse | Jennifer Flackett | October 13, 1993 | 2193084 | 16.4 |
| 87 | 7 | "Moving Targets" | Paul Schneider | Larry Mollin | October 20, 1993 | 2193085 | 13.9 |
| 88 | 8 | "Twenty Years Ago Today" | James Whitmore Jr. | Steve Wasserman & Jessica Klein | October 27, 1993 | 2193086 | 15.0 |
| 89 | 9 | "Otherwise Engaged" | Daniel Attias | Jennifer Flackett | November 3, 1993 | 2193087 | 16.3 |
| 90 | 10 | "And Did It... My Way" | Jason Priestley | Richard Gollance | November 10, 1993 | 2193088 | 17.0 |
| 91 | 11 | "Take Back the Night" | James Whitmore Jr. | Chip Johannessen | November 17, 1993 | 2193089 | 17.8 |
| 92 | 12 | "Radar Love" | Paul Schneider | Steve Wasserman & Jessica Klein | November 24, 1993 | 2193090 | 15.3 |
| 93 | 13 | "Emily" | Richard Lang | Steve Wasserman & Jessica Klein | December 1, 1993 | 2193091 | 15.5 |
| 94 | 14 | "Windstruck" | Gilbert M. Shilton | Larry Mollin & Richard Gollance | December 15, 1993 | 2193092 | 14.7 |
| 95 | 15 | "Somewhere in the World it's Christmas" | Bradley M. Gross | Charles Rosin | December 22, 1993 | 2193093 | 14.8 |
| 96 | 16 | "Crunch Time" | Les Landau | Larry Mollin & Richard Gollance | January 5, 1994 | 2193094 | 16.6 |
| 97 | 17 | "Thicker Than Water" | Michael Lange | Lana Freistat Melman | January 12, 1994 | 2193095 | 18.9 |
| 98 | 18 | "Heartbreaker" | Paul Schneider | Chip Johannessen | January 26, 1994 | 2193096 | 17.3 |
| 99 | 19 | "The Labors of Love" | Jefferson Kibbee | Christine Pettit & Rosanne Welch | February 2, 1994 | 2193097 | 16.5 |
| 100 | 20 | "Scared Very Straight" | Chip Chalmers | Gary Rosen | February 9, 1994 | 2193098 | 18.3 |
| 101 | 21 | "Addicted to Love" | Les Landau | Larry Mollin & Richard Gollance | February 16, 1994 | 2193099 | 17.3 |
| 102 | 22 | "Change Partners" | Bethany Rooney | Chip Johannessen | February 23, 1994 | 2193100 | 15.3 |
| 103 | 23 | "A Pig Is a Boy Is a Dog" | Daniel Attias | Larry Mollin & Richard Gollance | March 2, 1994 | 2193101 | 20.1 |
| 104 | 24 | "Cuffs and Links" | Gilbert M. Shilton | Steve Wasserman & Jessica Klein | March 16, 1994 | 2193102 | 18.4 |
| 105 | 25 | "The Time Has Come Today" | Jason Priestley | Story by : Charles Rosin & Mick Gallinson; Teleplay by : Charles Rosin | March 23, 1994 | 2193103 | 17.3 |
| 106 | 26 | "Blind Spot" | Michael Lange | Ken Stringer | April 6, 1994 | 2193104 | 16.2 |
| 107 | 27 | "Divas" | David Semel | Larry Mollin | April 20, 1994 | 2193105 | 13.8 |
| 108 | 28 | "Acting Out" | Jeff Melman | Chip Johannessen | April 27, 1994 | 2193106 | 17.5 |
| 109 | 29 | "Truth and Consequences" | James Eckhouse | Richard Gollance | May 4, 1994 | 2193107 | 16.2 |
| 110 | 30 | "Vital Signs" | Daniel Attias | Larry Mollin | May 11, 1994 | 2193108 | 17.1 |
| 111 | 31 | "Mr. Walsh Goes to Washington" | Michael Lange | Steve Wasserman & Jessica Klein & Charles Rosin | May 25, 1994 | 2193109A | 20.3 |
| 112 | 32 | "Mr. Walsh Goes to Washington" | Michael Lange | Steve Wasserman & Jessica Klein & Charles Rosin | May 25, 1994 | 2193109B | 20.3 |

=== Season 5 (1994–1995) ===
| No. overall | No. in season | Title | Directed by | Written by | Original release date | Prod. code | U.S. viewers (millions) |
|---|---|---|---|---|---|---|---|
| 113 | 1 | "What I Did on My Summer Vacation and Other Stories" | Michael Lange | Charles Rosin & Larry Mollin | September 7, 1994 | 2194110 | 21.2 |
| 114 | 2 | "Under the Influence" | Scott Paulin | Chip Johannessen | September 14, 1994 | 2194111 | 16.2 |
| 115 | 3 | "A Clean Slate" | Bethany Rooney | Richard Gollance | September 21, 1994 | 2194112 | 17.9 |
| 116 | 4 | "Life After Death" | James Whitmore Jr. | Steve Wasserman & Jessica Klein | September 28, 1994 | 2194113 | 18.5 |
| 117 | 5 | "Rave On" | David Semel | Larry Mollin | October 5, 1994 | 2194114 | 17.0 |
| 118 | 6 | "Homecoming" | Gilbert M. Shilton | Meredith Stiehm | October 12, 1994 | 2194115 | 18.0 |
| 119 | 7 | "Who's Zoomin' Who?" | Gabrielle Beaumont | Karen Rosin | October 19, 1994 | 2194116 | 15.5 |
| 120 | 8 | "Things That Go Bang in the Night" | Jason Priestley | Chip Johannessen | October 26, 1994 | 2194117 | 18.4 |
| 121 | 9 | "Intervention" | Daniel Attias | Steve Wasserman & Jessica Klein | November 2, 1994 | 2194118 | 18.0 |
| 122 | 10 | "The Dreams of Dylan McKay" | Scott Paulin | Charles Rosin | November 9, 1994 | 2194119 | 19.3 |
| 123 | 11 | "Hate Is Just a Four-Letter Word" | Les Landau | Story by : Richard Gollance; Teleplay by : Charles Rosin | November 16, 1994 | 2194120 | 17.1 |
| 124 | 12 | "Rock of Ages" | David Semel | Larry Mollin | November 23, 1994 | 2194121 | 12.4 |
| 125 | 13 | "Up in Flames" | Gilbert M. Shilton | Meredith Stiehm | November 30, 1994 | 2194122 | 17.0 |
| 126 | 14 | "Injustice for All" | Michael Lange | Karen Rosin | December 14, 1994 | 2194123 | 16.9 |
| 127 | 15 | "Christmas Comes This Time Each Year" | Richard Lang | Story by : Steve Wasserman & Jessica Klein; Teleplay by : Max Eisenberg | December 21, 1994 | 2194124 | 15.6 |
| 128 | 16 | "Sentenced to Life" | Jack Bender | Story by : Ian Ziering and Steve Wasserman & Jessica Klein; Teleplay by : Steve Wasserman & Jessica Klein | January 4, 1995 | 2194125 | 17.7 |
| 129 | 17 | "Sweating it Out" | Jason Priestley | Chip Johannessen | January 11, 1995 | 2194126 | 15.3 |
| 130 | 18 | "Hazardous to Your Health" | James Whitmore Jr. | Larry Mollin | January 18, 1995 | 2194127 | 16.5 |
| 131 | 19 | "Little Monsters" | James Eckhouse | Meredith Stiehm | February 1, 1995 | 2194128 | 16.0 |
| 132 | 20 | "You Gotta Have Heart" | Gilbert M. Shilton | Max Eisenberg | February 8, 1995 | 2194129 | 15.3 |
| 133 | 21 | "Stormy Weather" | Bethany Rooney | Story by : Larry Mollin; Teleplay by : Lana Freistat Melman | February 15, 1995 | 2194130 | 15.8 |
| 134 | 22 | "Alone at the Top" | Victor Lobl | Steve Wasserman & Jessica Klein | February 22, 1995 | 2194131 | 16.6 |
| 135 | 23 | "Love Hurts" | Gilbert M. Shilton | Story by : Larry Mollin; Teleplay by : Ken Stringer | March 1, 1995 | 2194132 | 15.5 |
| 136 | 24 | "Unreal World" | David Semel | Story by : Larry Mollin; Teleplay by : Meredith Stiehm | March 15, 1995 | 2194133 | 15.9 |
| 137 | 25 | "Double Jeopardy" | Richard Lang | Christine Elise McCarthy & Sam Sarkar | March 29, 1995 | 2194134 | 14.8 |
| 138 | 26 | "A Song for My Mother" | Chip Chalmers | Max Eisenberg | April 5, 1995 | 2194135 | 14.5 |
| 139 | 27 | "Squash It" | Les Landau | Story by : Larry Mollin; Teleplay by : Phil Savath | April 12, 1995 | 2194136 | 13.3 |
| 140 | 28 | "Girls on the Side" | Victor Lobl | Meredith Stiehm | May 3, 1995 | 2194137 | 11.4 |
| 141 | 29 | "The Real McCoy" | Jason Priestley | Story by : Charles Rosin & Larry Mollin; Teleplay by : Charles Rosin | May 10, 1995 | 2194138 | 11.4 |
| 142 | 30 | "Hello Life, Goodbye Beverly Hills" | James Whitmore Jr. | Steve Wasserman & Jessica Klein | May 17, 1995 | 2194139 | 13.6 |
| 143 | 31 | "P.S. I Love You" | Victor Lobl | Larry Mollin & Chip Johannessen | May 24, 1995 | 2194140A | 17.1 |
| 144 | 32 | "P.S. I Love You" | Victor Lobl | Larry Mollin & Chip Johannessen | May 24, 1995 | 2194140B | 17.1 |

=== Season 6 (1995–1996) ===
| No. overall | No. in season | Title | Directed by | Written by | Original release date | Prod. code | U.S. viewers (millions) |
|---|---|---|---|---|---|---|---|
| 145 | 1 | "Home Is Where the Tart Is" | Michael Lange | Steve Wasserman & Jessica Klein | September 13, 1995 | 2195141 | 16.0 |
| 146 | 2 | "Buffalo Gals" | James Whitmore, Jr. | Michael Lyons & Kimberly Wells | September 13, 1995 | 2195142 | 16.0 |
| 147 | 3 | "Must Be a Guy Thing" | Jason Priestley | John Eisendrath | September 20, 1995 | 2195143 | 14.9 |
| 148 | 4 | "Everything's Coming Up Roses" | Victor Lobl | Dinah Kirgo | September 27, 1995 | 2195144 | 14.1 |
| 149 | 5 | "Lover's Leap" | Bethany Rooney | Ken Stringer | October 4, 1995 | 2195145 | 13.0 |
| 150 | 6 | "Speechless" | David Semel | Meredith Stiehm & Larry Mollin | October 18, 1995 | 2195146 | 14.3 |
| 151 | 7 | "Violated" | Christopher Hibler | Meredith Stiehm & Larry Mollin | October 25, 1995 | 2195147 | 13.4 |
| 152 | 8 | "Gypsies, Cramps and Fleas" | Burt Brinckerhoff | Christine McCarthy & Sam Sarkar | November 1, 1995 | 2195148 | 14.7 |
| 153 | 9 | "Earthquake Weather" | Gilbert M. Shilton | Michael Lyons & Kimberly Wells | November 6, 1995 | 2195149 | 13.8 |
| 154 | 10 | "One Wedding and a Funeral" | James Whitmore, Jr. | Steve Wasserman | November 8, 1995 | 2195150 | 19.3 |
| 155 | 11 | "Offensive Interference" | Scott Paulin | Larry Mollin | November 15, 1995 | 2195151 | 15.8 |
| 156 | 12 | "Breast Side Up" | David Semel | Jessica Klein | November 22, 1995 | 2195152 | 13.2 |
| 157 | 13 | "Courting" | Gilbert M. Shilton | John Eisendrath | November 29, 1995 | 2195153 | 14.3 |
| 158 | 14 | "Fortunate Son" | James Fargo | Story by : Steve Wasserman & Larry Mollin & Jessica Klein; Teleplay by : Lana Freistat Melman & Steve Wasserman & John Eisendrath & John Whelpley | December 13, 1995 | 2195154 | 14.5 |
| 159 | 15 | "Angels We Have Heard On High" | Jason Priestley | Story by : Larry Mollin; Teleplay by : Phil Savath | December 20, 1995 | 2195155 | 14.9 |
| 160 | 16 | "Turn Back the Clock" | Graeme Lynch | Larry Mollin | January 3, 1996 | 2195156 | 16.1 |
| 161 | 17 | "Fade In, Fade Out" | Jason Priestley | Story by : Steve Wasserman & Jessica Klein; Teleplay by : Meredith Stiehm | January 10, 1996 | 2195157 | 14.2 |
| 162 | 18 | "Snowbound" | Chip Chalmers | John Whelpley | January 17, 1996 | 2195158 | 15.6 |
| 163 | 19 | "Nancy's Choice" | James Whitmore Jr. | John Eisendrath | January 31, 1996 | 2195159 | 13.6 |
| 164 | 20 | "Flying" | Chip Chalmers | Story by : Larry Mollin; Teleplay by : Phil Savath | February 7, 1996 | 2195160 | 14.4 |
| 165 | 21 | "Bleeding Hearts" | Jason Priestley | Story by : Larry Mollin; Teleplay by : Lana Freistat Melman | February 14, 1996 | 2195161 | 14.3 |
| 166 | 22 | "All This and Mary Too" | James Fargo | Sam Sarkar | February 21, 1996 | 2195162 | 14.1 |
| 167 | 23 | "Leap of Faith" | Christopher Hibler | Ken Stringer | February 28, 1996 | 2195163 | 14.1 |
| 168 | 24 | "Coming Out, Getting Out, Going Out" | Gilbert M. Shilton | John Whelpley | March 13, 1996 | 2195164 | 13.1 |
| 169 | 25 | "Smashed" | Charles Correll | Meredith Stiehm | March 20, 1996 | 2195165 | 13.7 |
| 170 | 26 | "Flirting with Disaster" | David Semel | John Eisendrath | April 3, 1996 | 2195166 | 12.8 |
| 171 | 27 | "Strike the Match" | James Darren | Steve Wasserman | April 10, 1996 | 2195167 | 12.1 |
| 172 | 28 | "The Big Hurt" | Frank Thackery | Larry Mollin | May 1, 1996 | 2195168 | 11.8 |
| 173 | 29 | "Ticket to Ride" | Anson Williams | Meredith Stiehm & John Whelpley | May 8, 1996 | 2195169 | 11.8 |
| 174 | 30 | "Ray of Hope" | Gilbert M. Shilton | Story by : Jessica Klein; Teleplay by : Phil Savath | May 15, 1996 | 2195170 | 12.3 |
| 175 | 31 | "You Say It's Your Birthday" | Michael Lange | Larry Mollin & Steve Wasserman | May 22, 1996 | 2195171A | 12.3 |
| 176 | 32 | "You Say It's Your Birthday" | Michael Lange | Larry Mollin & Steve Wasserman | May 22, 1996 | 2195171B | 12.3 |

=== Season 7 (1996–1997) ===
| No. overall | No. in season | Title | Directed by | Written by | Original release date | Prod. code | U.S. viewers (millions) |
|---|---|---|---|---|---|---|---|
| 177 | 1 | "Remember the Alamo" | James Whitmore, Jr. | Larry Mollin | August 21, 1996 | 2196172 | 12.3 |
| 178 | 2 | "Here We Go Again" | Anson Williams | Steve Wasserman | August 28, 1996 | 2196173 | 10.5 |
| 179 | 3 | "A Mate for Life" | Burt Brinckerhoff | John Whelpley | September 4, 1996 | 2196174 | 10.8 |
| 180 | 4 | "Disappearing Act" | David Semel | John Eisendrath | September 11, 1996 | 2196175 | 12.0 |
| 181 | 5 | "Pledging My Love" | James Darren | Phil Savath | September 18, 1996 | 2196176 | 11.2 |
| 182 | 6 | "Housewarming" | Chip Chalmers | Jessica Klein | September 25, 1996 | 2196177 | 11.8 |
| 183 | 7 | "Fearless" | Harvey Frost | Larry Mollin | October 30, 1996 | 2196178 | 11.7 |
| 184 | 8 | "The Things We Do for Love" | Gilbert M. Shilton | Laurie McCarthy | November 6, 1996 | 2196179 | 11.8 |
| 185 | 9 | "Loser Takes All" | Christopher Hibler | John Eisendrath | November 13, 1996 | 2196180 | 12.8 |
| 186 | 10 | "Lost in Las Vegas" | Michael Lange | Steve Wasserman | November 20, 1996 | 2196181 | 12.2 |
| 187 | 11 | "If I Had a Hammer" | Jason Priestley | John Whelpley | November 27, 1996 | 2196182 | 8.6 |
| 188 | 12 | "Judgement Day" | David Semel | Phil Savath | December 11, 1996 | 2196183 | 11.0 |
| 189 | 13 | "Gift Wrapped" | Kevin Inch | Christine McCarthy | December 18, 1996 | 2196184 | 12.9 |
| 190 | 14 | "Jobbed" | Jason Priestley | Larry Mollin | January 8, 1997 | 2196185 | 10.72 |
| 191 | 15 | "Phantom of C.U." | Les Landau | Steve Wasserman | January 15, 1997 | 2196186 | 11.88 |
| 192 | 16 | "Unnecessary Roughness" | Gilbert M. Shilton | John Whelpley | January 22, 1997 | 2196187 | 11.41 |
| 193 | 17 | "Face-Off" | Chip Chalmers | Laurie McCarthy | January 29, 1997 | 2196188 | 12.28 |
| 194 | 18 | "We Interrupt This Program" | Kevin Inch | John Eisendrath | February 5, 1997 | 2196189 | 12.61 |
| 195 | 19 | "My Funny Valentine" | David Semel | Jessica Klein | February 12, 1997 | 2196190 | 12.33 |
| 196 | 20 | "With This Ring" | Jason Priestley | Phil Savath | February 19, 1997 | 2196191 | 13.54 |
| 197 | 21 | "Straight Shooter" | Chip Chalmers | Larry Mollin | February 26, 1997 | 2196192 | 13.70 |
| 198 | 22 | "A Ripe Young Age" | Scott Paulin | Steve Wasserman | March 5, 1997 | 2196193 | 12.92 |
| 199 | 23 | "Storm Warnings" | Bethany Rooney | John Whelpley | March 19, 1997 | 2196194 | 11.94 |
| 200 | 24 | "Spring Breakdown" | Charlie Correll | Story by : Greg Plageman; Teleplay by : John Eisendrath | April 2, 1997 | 2196195 | 11.54 |
| 201 | 25 | "Heaven Sent" | Anson Williams | Story by : Larry Mollin & Phil Savath; Teleplay by : John Whelpley | April 9, 1997 | 2196196 | 11.55 |
| 202 | 26 | "The Long Goodbye" | Les Sheldon | Ken Stringer | April 16, 1997 | 2196197 | 11.63 |
| 203 | 27 | "I Only Have Eyes for You" | Christopher Hibler | Laurie McCarthy | April 23, 1997 | 2196198 | 11.33 |
| 204 | 28 | "All That Jazz" | Kevin Inch | Story by : Larry Mollin & Phil Savath; Teleplay by : Phil Savath | April 30, 1997 | 2196199 | 10.84 |
| 205 | 29 | "Mother's Day" | Chip Chalmers | Jessica Klein | May 7, 1997 | 2196200 | 13.04 |
| 206 | 30 | "Senior Week" | Jefferson Kibbee | John Eisendrath | May 14, 1997 | 2196201 | 11.65 |
| 207 | 31 | "Graduation Day" | Jason Priestley | Larry Mollin & Phil Savath | May 21, 1997 | 2196202A | 13.58 |
| 208 | 32 | "Graduation Day" | Jason Priestley | Larry Mollin & Phil Savath | May 21, 1997 | 2196202B | 13.58 |

=== Season 8 (1997–1998) ===
| No. overall | No. in season | Title | Directed by | Written by | Original release date | Prod. code | U.S. viewers (millions) |
|---|---|---|---|---|---|---|---|
| 209 | 1 | "Aloha Beverly Hills" | Bethany Rooney | Michael Braverman | September 10, 1997 | 2197203A | 13.99 |
| 210 | 2 | "Aloha Beverly Hills" | Bethany Rooney | Michael Braverman | September 10, 1997 | 2197203B | 13.99 |
| 211 | 3 | "Forgive and Forget" | David Semel | John Eisendrath | September 17, 1997 | 2197204 | 13.70 |
| 212 | 4 | "The Way We Weren't" | Frank Thackery | Michael Cassutt | September 24, 1997 | 2197205 | 11.28 |
| 213 | 5 | "Coming Home" | Georg Fenady | Laurie McCarthy | October 1, 1997 | 2197206 | 11.14 |
| 214 | 6 | "The Right Thing" | Chip Chalmers | Ken Stringer | October 15, 1997 | 2197207 | 10.94 |
| 215 | 7 | "Pride and Prejudice" | Harvey Frost | Rich Cooper | October 22, 1997 | 2197208 | 11.24 |
| 216 | 8 | "Toil and Trouble" | Richard Denault | Elle Triedman | October 29, 1997 | 2197209 | 11.36 |
| 217 | 9 | "Friends, Lovers and Children" | Michael Ray Rhodes | John Whelpley | November 5, 1997 | 2197210 | 13.33 |
| 218 | 10 | "Child of the Night" | Les Sheldon | John Eisendrath | November 12, 1997 | 2197211 | 12.96 |
| 219 | 11 | "Deadline" | Jon Paré | Michael Cassutt | November 19, 1997 | 2197212 | 12.15 |
| 220 | 12 | "Friends in Deed" | Richard Denault | Elle Triedman | December 3, 1997 | 2197213 | 11.52 |
| 221 | 13 | "Comic Relief" | Chip Chalmers | John Lavachielli | December 10, 1997 | 2197214 | 14.03 |
| 222 | 14 | "Santa Knows" | Charles Correll | Laurie McCarthy | December 17, 1997 | 2197215 | 12.26 |
| 223 | 15 | "Ready or Not" | John McPherson | Story by : Michael Cassutt & Rich Cooper & Laurie McCarthy; Teleplay by : Michael Cassutt & Laurie McCarthy | January 7, 1998 | 2197216 | 11.69 |
| 224 | 16 | "Illegal Tender" | Anson Williams | Ken Stringer | January 14, 1998 | 2197217 | 12.67 |
| 225 | 17 | "The Elephant's Father" | Michael Ray Rhodes | Story by : Elle Triedman & John Whelpley; Teleplay by : Elle Triedman | January 21, 1998 | 2197218 | 12.61 |
| 226 | 18 | "Rebound" | Charles Pratt, Jr. | Michael Cassutt | January 28, 1998 | 2197219 | 12.13 |
| 227 | 19 | "Crimes and Misdemeanors" | Charles Correll | Laurie McCarthy | February 4, 1998 | 2197220 | 12.44 |
| 228 | 20 | "Cupid's Arrow" | Kevin Inch | Melissa Gould | February 11, 1998 | 2197221 | 12.14 |
| 229 | 21 | "The Girl Who Cried Wolf" | Richard Denault | Ken Stringer | February 25, 1998 | 2197222 | 10.48 |
| 230 | 22 | "Law and Disorder" | Kevin Inch | Doug Steinberg | March 4, 1998 | 2197223 | 12.10 |
| 231 | 23 | "Making Amends" | Joel J. Feigenbaum | Elle Triedman | March 11, 1998 | 2197224 | 12.03 |
| 232 | 24 | "The Nature of Nurture" | Michael Ray Rhodes | Michael Cassutt | March 18, 1998 | 2197225 | 11.42 |
| 233 | 25 | "Aunt Bea's Pickles" | Christopher Hibler | Laurie McCarthy | March 25, 1998 | 2197226 | 11.43 |
| 234 | 26 | "All That Glitters" | Michael Lange | Tyler Bensinger | April 1, 1998 | 2197227 | 10.39 |
| 235 | 27 | "Reunion" | Chip Chalmers | Doug Steinberg | April 15, 1998 | 2197228 | 10.66 |
| 236 | 28 | "Skin Deep" | Kim Friedman | Elle Triedman | April 29, 1998 | 2197229 | 9.15 |
| 237 | 29 | "Ricochet" | Anson Williams | Laurie McCarthy | May 6, 1998 | 2197230 | 9.96 |
| 238 | 30 | "The Fundamental Things Apply" | Harvey Frost | Michael Cassutt & Melissa Gould | May 13, 1998 | 2197231 | 10.15 |
| 239 | 31 | "The Wedding" | Harry Harris | John Eisendrath & Laurie McCarthy & Doug Steinberg & Elle Triedman | May 20, 1998 | 2197232A | 13.77 |
| 240 | 32 | "The Wedding" | Harry Harris | John Eisendrath & Laurie McCarthy & Doug Steinberg & Elle Triedman | May 20, 1998 | 2197232B | 13.77 |

=== Season 9 (1998–1999) ===
| No. overall | No. in season | Title | Directed by | Written by | Original release date | Prod. code | U.S. viewers (millions) |
|---|---|---|---|---|---|---|---|
| 241 | 1 | "The Morning After" | Anson Williams | John Eisendrath | September 16, 1998 | 2198233 | 11.87 |
| 242 | 2 | "Budget Cuts" | Chip Chalmers | Laurie McCarthy | September 23, 1998 | 2198234 | 10.09 |
| 243 | 3 | "Dealer's Choice" | Jeff Melman | Douglas Steinberg | September 30, 1998 | 2198235 | 10.70 |
| 244 | 4 | "Don't Ask, Don't Tell" | Richard Denault | Ken Stringer | October 28, 1998 | 2198236 | 10.74 |
| 245 | 5 | "Brandon Leaves" | Christopher Hibler | John Eisendrath | November 4, 1998 | 2198237 | 11.75 |
| 246 | 6 | "Confession" | Kevin Inch | Tyler Bensinger | November 11, 1998 | 2198238 | 10.18 |
| 247 | 7 | "You Say Goodbye, I Say Hello" | Michael Lange | Gretchen J. Berg & Aaron Harberts | November 18, 1998 | 2198239 | 12.30 |
| 248 | 8 | "I'm Back Because" | Artie Mandelberg | John Eisendrath | December 2, 1998 | 2198240 | 10.77 |
| 249 | 9 | "The Following Options" | Gabrielle Beaumont | Laurie McCarthy | December 9, 1998 | 2198241 | 9.98 |
| 250 | 10 | "Marathon Man" | Joel J. Feigenbaum | Douglas Steinberg | December 16, 1998 | 2198242 | 10.00 |
| 251 | 11 | "How to Be the Jerk Women Love" | Harvey Frost | John Eisendrath | January 13, 1999 | 2198243 | 10.51 |
| 252 | 12 | "Trials and Tribulations" | Roy Campanella II | Story by : Gretchen J. Berg & Aaron Harberts; Teleplay by : Ken Stringer | January 20, 1999 | 2198244 | 10.37 |
| 253 | 13 | "Withdrawal" | Kevin Inch | Tyler Bensinger & John Eisendrath | January 27, 1999 | 2198245 | 10.35 |
| 254 | 14 | "I'm Married" | Anson Williams | John Eisendrath | February 3, 1999 | 2198246 | 9.71 |
| 255 | 15 | "Beheading St. Valentine" | Frank Thackery | Laurie McCarthy | February 10, 1999 | 2198247 | 9.52 |
| 256 | 16 | "Survival Skills" | Charlie Correll | Story by : Gretchen J. Berg & Aaron Harberts; Teleplay by : Doug Steinberg | February 17, 1999 | 2198248 | 9.26 |
| 257 | 17 | "Slipping Away" | Roy Campanella II | John Eisendrath | March 3, 1999 | 2198249 | 9.23 |
| 258 | 18 | "Bobbi Dearest" | Christian I. Nyby II | Laurie McCarthy & Tyler Bensinger | March 10, 1999 | 2198250 | 9.31 |
| 259 | 19 | "The Leprechaun" | Kevin Inch | John Eisendrath | March 17, 1999 | 2198251 | 9.28 |
| 260 | 20 | "Fortune Cookie" | Luke Perry | Douglas Steinberg & Ken Stringer | April 7, 1999 | 2198252 | 8.56 |
| 261 | 21 | "I Wanna Reach Out and Grab Ya" | Jennie Garth | Gretchen J. Berg & Aaron Harberts | April 14, 1999 | 2198253 | 8.86 |
| 262 | 22 | "Local Hero" | Joel J. Feigenbaum | Matt Dearborn | April 21, 1999 | 2198254 | 8.39 |
| 263 | 23 | "The End of the World as We Know It" | Michael Ray Rhodes | Story by : Gretchen J. Berg & Aaron Harberts; Teleplay by : Tyler Bensinger | April 28, 1999 | 2198255 | 8.31 |
| 264 | 24 | "Dog's Best Friend" | Christopher Hibler | Story by : John Eisendrath; Teleplay by : Laurie McCarthy | May 5, 1999 | 2198256 | 8.06 |
| 265 | 25 | "Agony" | Anson Williams | Douglas Steinberg | May 12, 1999 | 2198257 | 8.21 |
| 266 | 26 | "That's the Guy" | Michael Lange | John Eisendrath | May 19, 1999 | 2198258 | 8.46 |

=== Season 10 (1999–2000) ===
| No. overall | No. in season | Title | Directed by | Written by | Original release date | Prod. code | U.S. viewers (millions) |
|---|---|---|---|---|---|---|---|
| 267 | 1 | "The Phantom Menace" | Charles Correll | John Eisendrath | September 8, 1999 | 2199259 | 9.48 |
| 268 | 2 | "Let's Eat Cake" | Joel J. Feigenbaum | Laurie McCarthy | September 15, 1999 | 2199260 | 8.82 |
| 269 | 3 | "You Better Work" | Harvey Frost | Gretchen J. Berg & Aaron Harberts | September 22, 1999 | 2199261 | 7.95 |
| 270 | 4 | "A Fine Mess" | Allan Kroeker | John Eisendrath | September 29, 1999 | 2199262 | 8.82 |
| 271 | 5 | "The Loo-Ouch" | Kim Friedman | Tyler Bensinger | October 20, 1999 | 2199263 | 8.25 |
| 272 | 6 | "80's Night" | Chip Chalmers | John Eisendrath | October 27, 1999 | 2199264 | 7.81 |
| 273 | 7 | "Laying Pipe" | Luke Perry | Matt Dearborn | November 3, 1999 | F977AF | 8.61 |
| 274 | 8 | "Baby, You Can Drive My Car" | Kevin Inch | Story by : Laurie McCarthy; Teleplay by : Gretchen J. Berg & Aaron Harberts | November 10, 1999 | 2199266 | 8.21 |
| 275 | 9 | "Family Tree" | Allison Liddi | John Eisendrath | November 17, 1999 | 2199267 | 9.29 |
| 276 | 10 | "What's in a Name" | Christopher Hibler | Scott Fifer | November 17, 1999 | 2199268 | 9.29 |
| 277 | 11 | "Sibling Revelry" | Graeme Lynch | John Eisendrath | December 15, 1999 | 2199269 | 8.08 |
| 278 | 12 | "Nine Yolks Whipped Lightly" | Joel J. Feigenbaum | Laurie McCarthy | December 22, 1999 | 2199270 | 7.44 |
| 279 | 13 | "Tainted Love" | Robert Weaver | Jim Halterman | January 12, 2000 | 2199271 | 7.06 |
| 280 | 14 | "I'm Using You 'Cause I Like You" | Ian Ziering | Gretchen J. Berg & Aaron Harberts | January 19, 2000 | 2199272 | 7.27 |
| 281 | 15 | "Fertile Ground" | Victor Lobl | John Eisendrath | January 26, 2000 | 2199273 | 7.54 |
| 282 | 16 | "The Final Proof" | Brian Austin Green | Matt Dearborn & Tyler Bensinger | February 9, 2000 | 2199274 | 7.25 |
| 283 | 17 | "Doc Martin" | Kevin Inch | John Eisendrath & Laurie McCarthy | February 16, 2000 | 2199275 | 8.22 |
| 284 | 18 | "Eddie Waitkus" | Chip Chalmers | John Eisendrath | March 1, 2000 | 2199276 | 6.70 |
| 285 | 19 | "I Will Be Your Father Figure" | Tori Spelling | Story by : Scott Fifer; Teleplay by : Gretchen J. Berg & Aaron Harberts | March 8, 2000 | 2199277 | 7.10 |
| 286 | 20 | "Ever Heard the One About the Exploding Father?" | Anson Williams | John Eisendrath & Laurie McCarthy | March 15, 2000 | 2199278 | 7.14 |
| 287 | 21 | "Spring Fever" | Allison Liddi-Brown | Annie Brunner | March 22, 2000 | 2199279 | 7.49 |
| 288 | 22 | "The Easter Bunny" | Charlie Correll | John Eisendrath | April 5, 2000 | 2199280 | 6.47 |
| 289 | 23 | "And Don't Forget to Give Me Back My Black T-Shirt" | Allan Kroeker | Story by : Gretchen J. Berg & Aaron Harberts; Teleplay by : Matt Dearborn & Tyler Bensinger | April 19, 2000 | 2199281 | 6.56 |
| 290 | 24 | "Love Is Blind" | Jennie Garth | John Eisendrath | April 26, 2000 | 2199282 | 7.74 |
| 291 | 25 | "I'm Happy for You...Really" | Roy Campanella II | Laurie McCarthy | May 10, 2000 | 2199283 | 9.25 |
| 292 | 26 | "The Penultimate" | Michael Lange | John Eisendrath | May 17, 2000 | 2199284 | 14.38 |
| 293 | 27 | "Ode to Joy" | Kevin Inch | John Eisendrath | May 17, 2000 | 2199285 | 14.38 |

=== Specials ===
| No. | Title | Date | Format | U.S. Viewers (millions) |
|---|---|---|---|---|
| 1 | Behind the Zip Code | September 18, 1992 | VHS | N/A |
| 2 | Behind the Scenes | May 26, 1993 | TV | 11.4 |
| 3 | A Christmas Special | December 19, 1994 | TV | 12.3 |
| 4 | The Best Moments | January 24, 1996 | TV | 11.9 |
| 5 | Our Favorite Moments | October 14, 1998 | TV | 7.13 |
| 6 | The Final Goodbye | May 10, 2000 | TV | 9.68 |
| 7 | E! True Hollywood Story | July 22, 2001 | TV | N/A |
| 8 | 10 Year High School Reunion | May 11, 2003 | TV | 7.01 |
| 9 | Biography | September 28, 2010 | DVD | N/A |
| 10 | Where Are They Now? | January 15, 2015 | TV | N/A |
| 11 | The Story Behind | February 4, 2015 | TV | N/A |
