= Apocalypse Rising =

- Star Trek: Deep Space Nine episode
- Episode no.: Season 5 Episode 1
- Directed by: James L. Conway
- Written by: Ira Steven Behr; Robert Hewitt Wolfe
- Production code: 499
- Original air date: September 30, 1996

Guest appearances
- Marc Alaimo as Dukat; Robert O'Reilly as Gowron; J. G. Hertzler as Martok; Casey Biggs as Damar; John Lendale Bennett as Towering Klingon; Robert L. Zachar as Head Guard; Robert Budaska as Burly Klingon; Ivor Bartels as Young Klingon; Tony Epper as Drunken Klingon

Episode chronology
← Previous "Broken Link"	Next → "The Ship"
- Star Trek: Deep Space Nine season 5

"Apocalypse Rising" is the 99th episode of the television series Star Trek: Deep Space Nine, the first episode of the fifth season. The episode was directed by James L. Conway, and written by Ira Steven Behr and Robert Hewitt Wolfe.

Set in the 24th century, the series follows the adventures of the crew of the space station Deep Space Nine, operated jointly by the United Federation of Planets and the planet of Bajor. In the middle seasons of the series, the Federation is under threat from both the Klingon Empire and an empire known as the Dominion, which is ruled by the shape-shifting Changelings. In this episode, suspecting that a Changeling is impersonating the Klingon chancellor Gowron, the Deep Space Nine crew undertake a mission to expose the impostor. This storyline is a continuation from the events in the season 4 finale, "Broken Link".

"Apocalypse Rising" was seen by about 5.5 million viewers when it debuted.

== Plot ==
The Federation and the Klingon Empire are now at war. Having learned from security chief Odo that a Changeling has taken Gowron's form and is now in control of the Klingon Empire, Captain Benjamin Sisko is ordered by Starfleet Command to expose the impostor. He, Odo, Miles O'Brien, and Worf must infiltrate Ty'Gokor, the headquarters of the Klingon military, disguised as Klingon candidates for the "Order of the Bat'leth". They are given four devices which, when activated, will emit radiation which will force any nearby Changeling to revert to its gelatinous state. Gul Dukat escorts them to Ty'Gokor in his captured Klingon Bird of Prey. Odo however is feeling sorry for himself having been stripped of his shapeshifting abilities, and is relucant to join the mission convinced he'll make a mistake but agrees when Sisko insists.

The four arrive at the Hall of Warriors, where the all-night party before the induction ceremony has already begun, and try to blend in. When General Martok, second in command to Gowron, arrives, the four scramble to set up their radiation emitters. Gowron arrives and begins issuing the awards. When Sisko is called to receive his award, he attempts to activate the emitters, but is knocked to the floor by Martok, who has finally recognized them and has them thrown in a security cell.

Once they are alone, Martok confides to Sisko that he too believes that Gowron is an impostor. With the emitters destroyed, the only way to expose Gowron is to kill him. Martok releases Sisko and his group and leads them back to the Hall of Warriors. Worf challenges Gowron to a one-on-one duel. Martok wonders why Sisko does not shoot Gowron outright. Odo observes that Gowron chose to fight Worf in single combat, thus showing Klingon honor, while Changelings do not care for honor; he concludes that the Changeling is not Gowron, but Martok. Just when Worf is about to kill Gowron, Odo reveals the false Martok to the crowd. The Changeling starts to strange Odo with a tendril, exposing itself, leading to Sisko and all the assembled Klingons shooting it with their disruptos killing it.

Gowron realizes that Odo was fed false intelligence that Gowron was the Changeling, which would have led to Gowron's assassination by the Federation, allowing the fake Martok, and therefore the Dominion, to gain full control of the Klingon Empire. Gowron refuses to end the war, but does agrees to a ceasefire. He thanks Sisko and Odo for their help and agrees to arrange transport to take them safely back to DS9. He also tells Worf he should have killed him when he had the chance. Back on the station, the four officers are restored to their regular appearances. Bashir offers to make Odo resemble any species he likes, but Odo decides he's perfectly happy with his usual face.

== Production ==
The primary photography for the episode was conducted on Stage 18 at the Paramount Pictures lot which was used to represent the Klingon Hall of Warriors. The set featured statues 12 feet (3.7 m) high. Different styles of lighting were used in the Hall as compared to the Klingon prison in order to ensure that the two looked different. While there were flicker boxes installed in the Hall of Warriors set in order to give the appearance of fire, overhead blue lighting was used in the prison in order to make the set look much colder. Because of the size of the Hall of Warriors, cinematographer Jonathan West used bleached muslin to hide fluorescent lamps in the window treatments.

The bridge of the Bird of Prey was lit by overhead lights through patterned grids. One scene which featured over a hundred Klingons on scene was shot with only fifty extras. West used a split-screen effect filmed three times with a locked off camera each time which was then composited together in post effects.

The comedic scene in which Kira argues with Bashir and says that her surrogate pregnancy "is [his] fault" is a meta-joke, as in-reality actress Nana Visitor was legitimately pregnant, by Bashir's actor Alexander Siddig.

== Reception ==
Zack Handlen of The A.V. Club praised this episode for its "pulpy charms" and enjoyed seeing the main characters disguised as Klingons: "it really is fun, with some solid twists and soul-searching sprinkled throughout." Keith R. A. DeCandido of Tor.com rated the episode 7 out of 10.

In 2015, Geek.com recommended this episode as "essential watching" for their abbreviated Star Trek: Deep Space Nine binge-watching guide.

"Apocalypse Rising" was nominated for two Primetime Emmy Awards, for Outstanding Makeup and Outstanding Cinematography for a Single-Camera Series for the work by Jonathan West.
