= Benjamin Maxwell =

Benjamin Maxwell may refer to:

- Ben Maxwell (born 1988), an ice hockey player for the Winnipeg Jets
- Captain Benjamin Maxwell, a character in the television series episode The Wounded (Star Trek: The Next Generation)
