= Broken Link (Star Trek: Deep Space Nine) =

- Star Trek: Deep Space Nine episode
- Episode no.: Season 4 Episode 26
- Directed by: Les Landau
- Story by: George A. Brozak
- Teleplay by: Robert Hewitt Wolfe; Ira Steven Behr
- Production code: 498
- Original air date: June 17, 1996

Guest appearances
- Andrew J. Robinson as Garak; Salome Jens as Female Shapeshifter; Robert O'Reilly as Gowron; Jill Jacobson as Aroya; Leslie Bevis as Freighter Captain

Episode chronology
← Previous "Body Parts"	Next → "Apocalypse Rising"
- Star Trek: Deep Space Nine season 4

"Broken Link" is the 98th episode of the science fiction television series Star Trek: Deep Space Nine, the 26th and final episode of the fourth season.

Set in the 24th century, the series follows the adventures of the crew of the space station Deep Space Nine, which is adjacent to a wormhole leading to the distant Gamma Quadrant. The Gamma Quadrant is home to an expansionist empire known as the Dominion, ruled by the shape-shifting Changelings. In this episode, Deep Space Nine's security chief Odo, a Changeling who has rejected the Dominion, becomes ill and has difficulty holding a solid form, so the USS Defiant brings him to the Gamma Quadrant in search of a cure.

On its premiere, "Broken Link" achieved a rating of 6.2 Nielsen points.

== Plot ==
Odo suddenly collapses, having difficulty maintaining his form, and is taken to the infirmary. Dr. Bashir cannot find an explanation for Odo's condition, but advises him to take a rest from his duties. Odo is reluctant to do so, but when he leaves the infirmary to investigate a crime, he collapses into a puddle on the floor.

Odo knows that the only people that can help him are his own people, the Founders of the Dominion. Captain Sisko agrees to take Odo to the Gamma Quadrant aboard the Defiant; the Cardassian spy-turned-tailor Elim Garak asks to come along as well. They are met by a spokesperson for the Founders, who tells Odo that the only way he can be cured is by physically joining the Founders in the Great Link, where he will be judged for the crime of being the first Changeling to harm another. Odo surmises that the Founders themselves must have infected him in order to coerce him into returning to the Great Link. A squad of the Dominion's Jem'Hadar soldiers accompanies the group aboard the Defiant, navigating to the Founders' planet and erasing all records of the journey from the ship's computer.

Garak asks the Founder if there are any Cardassian survivors from the failed Cardassian–Romulan attack on the Founders' homeworld a year earlier. She bluntly replies that there were no survivors and that Cardassia is doomed. Later, Garak attempts to fire the ship's weapons on the Founders' planet and annihilate the Changelings, but Commander Worf catches him and stops him.

Sisko and Bashir accompany the Founder and Odo to the planet and see the Great Link: a sea of Changelings in their liquid form. Odo and the Founders' spokesperson walk into the sea, leaving Bashir and Sisko to wait for them. Eventually, Odo is expelled from the Great Link; Bashir notes in astonishment that Odo's body has become human. The Founders' spokesperson explains that this is Odo's punishment.

After they return to the station, a message from Gowron, leader of the Klingon Empire, is received, declaring the initiation of hostilities against the Federation. Watching the message, Odo reveals that he felt that the Founders were trying to hide information from him while he was in the Great Link, but now he thinks he knows what it was: Gowron himself has been replaced by a Changeling.

== Reception ==
In 2019, Tor.com noted this as an "essential" episode for the character of Odo, remarking how it presents the character with major problems that are resolved in later seasons.
