= Mary Kay Adams =

American actress (born 1962)

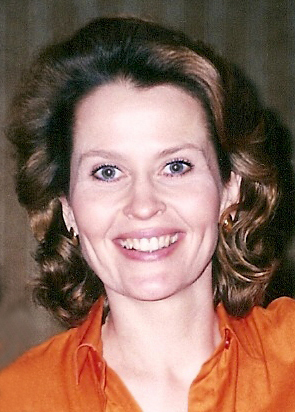
- Adams in June 2007
- Born: September 12, 1962 (age 63); Middletown, New Jersey, U.S.
- Occupation: Actress
- Years active: 1984–2005

Mary Kay Adams (born September 12, 1962) is an American actress. She is best knowing for playing the roles of India von Halkein on the CBS soap opera Guiding Light (1984 to 1987, return appearances from 1990 to 2005) and Na'Toth on the science fiction television series Babylon 5 (1994 to 1995). She also had a recurring role as Grilka on Star Trek: Deep Space Nine (1994 and 1996).

== Early life ==
Adams was born and raised in Middletown Township, New Jersey. She did so well academically that she was allowed to skip a grade. She was the president of many clubs during her high school years and involved in theater. Adams graduated from Mater Dei High School in 1979. She attended Emerson College, where she was a sister of Sigma Pi Theta and graduated with a Bachelor of Fine Arts.

== Career ==
After graduating from college, Adams moved to New York and joined a Shakespearean repertory company. Within a year, she was cast as India Von Halkein, a jet-setting baroness, on the CBS soap opera Guiding Light. She began airing in the role in August 1984 and left the show when her contract ended in April 1987.

Adams played Dr. Bennett in the 1989 comedy film See No Evil, Hear No Evil. In August 1989, she starred on stage in the play In Her Own Words (A Portrait of Jane) at the Courtyard Playhouse in New York. She returned to Guiding Light as India for several months in 1990. She guest starred on The 100 Lives of Black Jack Savage in 1991 and Jake and the Fatman in 1992.

Adams appeared on stage in a seven-month run of the play Tamara. She starred as Elizabeth in the play Program for Murder at New York's off-Broadway Variety Arts Theater.

Adams joined the cast of the CBS soap opera As the World Turns as Neal Keller Alcott, first airing on December 7, 1992. She appeared on the show until 1993. The character was killed off when her brother's alternate personality shoved her into a fireplace mantle and she hit her head. From October to November 1993, she appeared on stage in the play How the Other Half Loves at New York's Theater at St. Peter's Church.

From 1994 to 1995, Adams played Na'Toth in the second season of the science fiction series Babylon 5. She also had a recurring role as Grilka on Star Trek: Deep Space Nine, appearing in episodes "The House of Quark" and "Looking for par'Mach in All the Wrong Places".

She played Barbara McDaniels in Fast Company, a television film starring Ann Jillian, in 1995. She guest starred on The John Larroquette Show in 1995. Adams also made guest appearances on Everybody Loves Raymond, Roseanne, and Diagnosis: Murder in 1997. She returned to Guiding Light, playing the role of India from November 1998 to August 1999.

Adams guest starred on Third Watch in 1999 and Law & Order in 2000. She returned to Guiding Light for a few episodes in October 2002. She had a recurring role as Diane Lacey on the ABC soap opera All My Children in 2003. Adams played Fran in the horror film Satan's Little Helper in 2004. She made a brief return to Guiding Light in September 2005, making her last appearance on the show.

== Filmography ==
=== Film ===
Year	Title	Role	Notes
1984	The Muppets Take Manhattan	Woman in Crawford's Office	Uncredited
1989	See No Evil, Hear No Evil	Dr. Bennett	
1993	Born Yesterday	Girl	Uncredited
2004	Satan's Little Helper	Fran	

=== Television ===
Year	Title	Role	Notes
1984–1987; 1990; 1998–1999; 2002; 2005	Guiding Light	India von Halkein Spaulding	Contract role (1984–1987); Recurring role
1991	The 100 Lives of Black Jack Savage	Marla Lance	Episode: "Deals Are Made to Be Broken"
1992	Jake and the Fatman	Loretta Grimes	Episode: "Last Dance"
1992	One Life to Live	Death	Recurring role
1992–1993	As the World Turns	Neal Keller Alcott	Recurring role
1994	Traps		Episode: "Make Way for Duckling"
1994–1995	Babylon 5	Na'Toth	22 episodes
1994; 1996	Star Trek: Deep Space Nine	Grilka	2 episodes
1995	Fast Company	Barbara McDaniels	Television film
1995	The Crew	Diana	Episode: "The Sugar Shack"
1995	Land's End	Mildred	Episode: "Parentnapping"
1996	The Home Court	Dana	Episode: "Laborer of Love"
1996	The John Larroquette Show	Bunny Abelson	Episode: "Mother of the Year"
1996	Dark Skies	Alicia Bainbridge	Episode: "Moving Targets"
1997	Everybody Loves Raymond	Dr. Nora Sarrazin	Episode: "Fascinatin' Debra"
1997	Diagnosis: Murder	Vanessa Sinclair	Episode: "The Murder of Mark Sloan"
1997	Roseanne	Mrs. Barnes	Episode: "Lanford's Elite"
1999	Third Watch	Katherine Zambrano	Episode: "Hell Is What You Make of It"
2000	Law & Order	Nancy Alvarez	Episode: "Trade This"
2003	All My Children	Diane Lacey	Recurring role
