= Body Parts (Star Trek: Deep Space Nine) =

- Star Trek: Deep Space Nine episode
- Episode no.: Season 4 Episode 25
- Directed by: Avery Brooks
- Story by: Louis P. DeSantis; Robert J. Bolivar
- Teleplay by: Hans Beimler
- Production code: 497
- Original air date: June 10, 1996

Guest appearances
- Max Grodénchik as Rom and Gint; Andrew J. Robinson as Garak; Rosalind Chao as Keiko; Hana Hatae as Molly; Jeffrey Combs as Brunt

Episode chronology
← Previous "The Quickening"	Next → "Broken Link"
- Star Trek: Deep Space Nine season 4

"Body Parts" is the 97th episode of the television series Star Trek: Deep Space Nine and the 25th episode of the fourth season.

Set in the 24th century, the series follows the adventures on the space station Deep Space Nine. This is one of several episodes that focus on the Ferengi, a species known for their devotion to earning profit. The Ferengi bartender Quark, believing himself to be terminally ill, auctions off his remains; when he discovers that the diagnosis was incorrect, he must either breach the contract, or end his life in order to deliver the merchandise.

The episode also writes actress Nana Visitor's real-life pregnancy into the story by having the pregnancy of the character Keiko O'Brien transferred to Visitor's character, Major Kira Nerys, following an accident.

== Plot ==
Quark learns that he has a rare disease that will kill him within a week. To raise money to pay his debts before he dies, he auctions off his remains, accepting an anonymous bid for 500 bars of gold-pressed latinum. A few hours later, he finds out that his medical exam was in error, and he is not about to die.

The bidder turns out to be Quark's old adversary Brunt, an agent of the Ferengi Commerce Authority. Brunt demands that Quark fulfill his end of the contract by providing his remains, ignoring Quark's protests that he will live. Quark faces the options of killing himself, having someone kill him, or breaking the contract—an act that will lead to the loss of his business license, confiscation of his family's property, and ostracism by other Ferengi.

Quark decides to honor his contract and attempts to hire ex-spy Garak to kill him. However, he is afraid to approve any of the killing methods that Garak proposes. That night, Quark has a dream in which he meets Gint, the first Grand Nagus of the Ferengi and the author of the sacred Rules of Acquisition. Explaining that the Rules were intended merely as suggestions, and that they were named "Rules" only for marketing purposes, Gint advises Quark to break the contract.

The next morning, Quark refunds Brunt's latinum and breaks the contract. Brunt immediately revokes Quark's business license, and seizes all of his assets. To Quark's astonishment, his customers and the crew of Deep Space Nine come to his aid by carrying in all the supplies and equipment he needs to resume operations, on the pretext of using the bar to store furniture while portions of the station are under repair. Even though Quark is cut off from Ferengi society, he is back in business and realises just how valuable his friends on the station are.

Meanwhile, the pregnant Keiko O'Brien is injured in a runabout accident; to save both her and the pregnancy, Dr. Bashir performs emergency surgery to transfer the fetus into Major Kira's body. Kira has no problem with being a surrogate mother, but Keiko and her husband Miles are at first uncomfortable with the thought of another woman carrying their child. They eventually come to terms with it, and ask Kira to move in with them so they can be closer to the child.

== Production ==
The writers had learned that Nana Visitor was pregnant and were not sure how to work her pregnancy into the show. They had already made Keiko O'Brien pregnant and did not want to have two visibly pregnant characters, but they did not want to limit Kira Nerys either by hiding her behind a desk, as they had done with Gates McFadden's character in Star Trek: The Next Generation during her pregnancy. Ira Behr mentioned this to his wife Laura and she simply suggested they move the baby from Keiko to Kira. Science consultant André Bormanis thought the idea strained credulity, but it was his job to make it at least sound plausible. Bormanis consulted with a pathologist John Glasco who thought it was implausible although maybe not impossible with the help of future technology.

"Body Parts" was directed by Avery Brooks, the actor who portrayed Sisko.

== Reception ==
The episode received a Nielsen rating of 5.1 on its initial airdate.

A 2014 retrospective by Keith R. A. DeCandido praised the episode and scored it an 8/10. DeCandido wrote that the acting for the Ferengi characters, in particular Max Grodénchik (Rom), was excellent, and supported an interesting exploration of both how Quark was similar and also differed from Ferengi culture as a whole. While he thought the Kira-Keiko pregnancy subplot was obviously artificial, it was clearly there to service a real-world need, did not take up too much time, and enabled later episodes to use Visitor in an unrestricted fashion without need for tricky camera angles.

In 2018, SyFy recommend the episode in an abbreviated watch guide for episodes featuring the character Kira Nerys.
