= ...Nor the Battle to the Strong =

- Star Trek: Deep Space Nine episode
- Episode no.: Season 5 Episode 4
- Directed by: Kim Friedman
- Story by: Brice R. Parker
- Teleplay by: René Echevarria
- Cinematography by: Kris Krosskove; Jonathan West
- Production code: 502
- Original air date: October 21, 1996

Guest appearances
- Andrew Kavovit as Kirby; Karen Austin as Kalandra; Mark Holton as Bolian; Lisa Lord as Nurse; Jeb Brown as Ensign; Danny Goldring as Burke

Episode chronology
← Previous "Looking for par'Mach in All the Wrong Places"	Next → "The Assignment"
- Star Trek: Deep Space Nine season 5

"...Nor the Battle to the Strong" is the 102nd episode of the American syndicated science fiction television series Star Trek: Deep Space Nine, the fourth episode of the fifth season.

Set in the 24th century, the series follows the adventures on Deep Space Nine, a space station located near a stable wormhole between the Alpha and Gamma quadrants of the Milky Way Galaxy. In the middle seasons of the series, the United Federation of Planets is in a state of hostility with the Klingon Empire. In this episode, budding journalist Jake Sisko (Cirroc Lofton) finds himself helping out in an emergency field hospital at a Federation colony under Klingon attack.

This episode attained a Nielsen rating of 5 points, corresponding to about 4.9 million viewers when it was broadcast on television in October 1996.

== Plot ==
Jake Sisko is returning from a medical conference with Dr. Julian Bashir. Although Jake intended to write an article about Bashir, he cannot find anything interesting in the latter's description of the conference. They receive a distress call from a Federation colony which has just been attacked by the Klingons in violation of a ceasefire agreement. Seeing the potential for a gripping story, Jake persuades Bashir to take him along.

Jake has trouble handling the chaotic emergency room situation at the hospital, particularly triage. One of the patients, a Starfleet soldier, claims to have been shot in the foot by the Klingons, but Bashir discovers that the wound was self-inflicted, intended to get him out of the fighting. Jake is disgusted by the man's cowardice.

Everyone expects the Klingons will overrun the settlement within days if no reinforcements arrive. On Deep Space Nine, Jake's father, Captain Benjamin Sisko, takes command of the starship Defiant to come to aid the colony after the ship intended to deliver those troops is destroyed in transit.

When the power goes out as a result of a Klingon attack, Jake and Bashir attempt to retrieve a portable generator from their runabout. The two come under enemy fire, and a terrified Jake abandons Bashir and runs for cover. He encounters a mortally wounded Starfleet soldier and tries desperately to help him, but the dying man accuses Jake of merely trying to atone for his cowardice. By the time Jake returns to the hospital, Bashir has returned with the generator but has sustained injuries as a result of the fighting. Jake claims that he became disoriented and was knocked unconscious, and Bashir blames himself for putting Jake in danger. Jake speaks with the soldier who wounded himself, and the two commiserate over the terror of battle. Jake has an angry outburst over the calm demeanor and dark humor exhibited by the staff, but refuses to tell Bashir what is bothering him.

The Klingons storm the hospital, forcing the staff to evacuate the patients. Pinned down by disruptor fire, Jake picks up a dropped phaser rifle and fires blindly into the air. His shots cause a cave-in that knocks him unconscious; when he wakes up, his father and Bashir are standing over him. He has suffered only a few bruises, and the cave-in delayed the Klingons long enough for all the patients to be evacuated safely. The Klingons have withdrawn from the area, and the ceasefire has been reinstated.

Although Jake is considered a hero for his actions, he writes the truth in his article, concluding that the line between courage and cowardice is much thinner than he originally believed. He gives one copy to Bashir and another to his father, who tells Jake how proud he is.

== Title ==
The title comes from a line in the Bible, Ecclesiastes 9:11, which reads "I have seen something else under the sun: The race is not to the swift nor the battle to the strong, ... but time and chance happen to them all."

== Reception ==
Tor.com gave the episode 8 out of 10.

In 2015, Geek.com recommended this episode for their abbreviated Star Trek: Deep Space Nine binge-watching guide.
