= Take Me Out to the Holosuite =

- Star Trek: Deep Space Nine episode
- Episode no.: Season 7 Episode 4
- Directed by: Chip Chalmers
- Written by: Ronald D. Moore
- Production code: 554
- Original air date: October 19, 1998

Guest appearances
- Max Grodénchik as Rom; Aron Eisenberg as Nog; Gregory Wagrowski as Solok; Chase Masterson as Leeta; Penny Johnson as Kasidy Yates; Mark Allen Shepherd as Morn

Episode chronology
← Previous "Afterimage"	Next → "Chrysalis"
- Star Trek: Deep Space Nine season 7

"Take Me Out to the Holosuite" is the 154th episode of the television series Star Trek: Deep Space Nine, the fourth episode of the seventh season. This episode was written by Ronald D. Moore and directed by Chip Chalmers.

Set in the 24th century, the series follows the adventures of the crew of the Starfleet-managed Bajoran space station Deep Space Nine. In this episode, the Deep Space Nine crew, led by Captain Benjamin Sisko, are challenged to a game of baseball against an all-Vulcan crew. Sisko's love of baseball was first established in the episode "Emissary", the series premiere.

This episode was first broadcast the week of October 19, 1998, during the 1998 World Series.

The title refers to the 1908 song "Take Me Out to the Ball Game", an anthem for the sport of baseball.

== Plot ==
The starship T'Kumbra docks at Deep Space Nine for repairs. Its captain, Solok, is a longtime rival of Sisko, who believes that his all-Vulcan crew are superior in every respect; he challenges Sisko to a baseball game in the holosuite. Sisko accepts, recruiting his crew and friends on the station to form a team, even though he has only two weeks to get the team into shape, and only his son Jake and his girlfriend Kasidy Yates have played the game before.

Sisko's team trains hard and suffers injuries. When Sisko dismisses the inept Rom from the team, the squad nearly quits in protest. Sisko admits to Yates why he is taking Solok's challenge so seriously: at Starfleet Academy, Sisko drunkenly challenged Solok to a wrestling match, after Solok provoked Sisko by mocking humans' illogical emotion-driven behavior. Solok won the match easily, and later used the incident as evidence that Vulcans are superior to humans, publishing multiple papers using the wrestling match as an example. Yates quickly tells the truth to the whole team, making them understand just how much this means to Sisko.

When the game begins, the Logicians (Solok's team) immediately build up a considerable lead. Sisko gets into an altercation with the umpire, security chief Odo, and is thrown out of the game for laying a finger on him.

When Rom's son Nog throws out a runner who failed to touch home plate, Sisko is reminded of why he loves baseball in the first place: its unpredictability. Seeing Rom's pride in his son and dejection at being excluded from the game, Sisko decides to allow him to play. Near the end and down 10-0, the Niners (Sisko's team) are desperate to score a run. Nog makes it to third base, and Rom has his first at-bat. Rom accidentally hits a perfect bunt, which brings Nog home, giving the Niners their only run in a 10-1 loss. The team's celebration confuses Solok, who protests to Odo, but also touches him so Odo ejects him too.

After the game, the crew relax at Quark's bar, toasting the triumph of team spirit over Vulcan superiority. Solok protests their celebration as a "manufactured victory", only to be mocked by the Niners. The team presents Sisko with a souvenir of the game: a baseball that his whole team has signed.

== Production ==
The prominence of baseball in Deep Space Nine stems from the influence of Michael Piller, co-creator of the series and a baseball fan. The script was written by Ronald D. Moore, based on an idea from Ira Steven Behr, who had previously written a similar baseball-themed episode of the series Fame titled "The Ol' Ball Game". The episode was directed by Chip Chalmers, who previously directed the episode "The Magnificent Ferengi". He knew the episode was going to be fun, and said he "smiled all the way through every read." Chalmers enjoyed filming on location but the weather was a risk, and fog was an issue. He insisted that stand-in doubles be provided so that actors, especially those in prosthetic makeup, would not have to stay in the sun when they were only in the background.

Max Grodénchik, who plays Rom, is actually a baseball player in real life and considered going pro before deciding to become an actor. Because Grodénchik was so good at playing right-handed, he was forced to switch to playing exclusively left-handed on camera in order to give a convincingly "bad" performance. Nana Visitor suggested that Rom be lifted up and carried in celebration.

A baseball field at Loyola Marymount University in California, where the holosuite scenes were filmed

The outdoor scenes (in the holosuite) were shot at Loyola Marymount University in Los Angeles.

== Reception ==
In 2016, The Hollywood Reporter ranked "Take Me Out to the Holosuite" as the 16th out of twenty best Star Trek: Deep Space Nine episodes. Zack Handlen of The A.V. Club noted in his 2014 review of the episode that it investigates the emotions of losing, and leadership of an 'underdog' sports team. Keith R. A. DeCandido of Tor.com gave the episode a rating of seven out of ten. Cinefantastique gave the episode 3.5 out of four stars.

In 2016, SyFy ranked this the eighth best holodeck episode of the Star Trek franchise.

The episode is noted for its impact on fan culture, with reproductions of the baseball jersey featured in the television show made available for sale in the late 2010s. The baseball game holosuite program was rated by Gizmodo as the number 1 best holodeck program of Star Trek. The episode is noted for exploring Sisko's interest in baseball and its humour.

In 2016, The Hollywood Reporter ranked "Take Me Out to the Holosuite" as the 61st best episode of all Star Trek episodes, and the 16th best of Star Trek: Deep Space Nine.

In 2016, Vox rated this one of the top 25 essential episodes of all Star Trek.

In 2019, CBR ranked this the seventh best holodeck-themed episode of all Star Trek franchise episodes up to that time. In 2019, CBR rated "Take Me Out to the Holosuite" as the 15th funniest Star Trek episode. StarTrek.com included it on a list of 15 of the funniest Star Trek episodes.

Sisko's strategy in assigning his players to positions was analyzed in a 2011 article at Baseball Prospectus. They compare how Sisko assembled and managed his baseball team to how he has dealt with war, politics and religion.

== Connections ==
The starship T'Kumbra is used or referenced in several Star Trek novels.
