= Data's Day =

- Star Trek: The Next Generation episode
- Episode no.: Season 4 Episode 11
- Directed by: Robert Wiemer
- Story by: Harold Apter
- Teleplay by: Harold Apter; Ronald D. Moore
- Cinematography by: Marvin Rush
- Production code: 185
- Original air date: January 7, 1991

Guest appearances
- Rosalind Chao - Keiko O'Brien; Colm Meaney - Miles O'Brien; Sierra Pecheur - T'Pel/Selok; Alan Scarfe - Mendak; Shelly Desai - V'Sal; April Grace - Transporter Technician

Episode chronology
← Previous "The Loss"	Next → "The Wounded"
- Star Trek: The Next Generation season 4

"Data's Day" is the 85th episode of the American science fiction television series Star Trek: The Next Generation, the 11th episode of the fourth season. This episode introduces both Keiko O'Brien and Data's pet cat, Spot.

Set in the 24th century, the series follows the adventures of the Starfleet crew of the Federation starship Enterprise-D. In this episode, as Data contemplates the impending marriage of his friend Keiko Ishikawa to Transporter Chief Miles O'Brien, he learns about the peculiar minutiae – such as last-minute jitters and ballroom dancing – that surround human nuptials. At the same time, he investigates the apparent death of the Vulcan ambassador whom the Enterprise was ferrying to the Neutral Zone in order to conduct treaty negotiations with the Romulans.

== Plot ==
Transporter Chief Miles O'Brien (Colm Meaney) and civilian botanist Keiko Ishikawa (Rosalind Chao) are about to be married, and Data (Brent Spiner) has been asked to give the bride away. After Keiko calls off the wedding, Data seeks advice from Geordi (LeVar Burton) and Counselor Troi (Marina Sirtis). He attempts to convince Keiko to go through with the wedding. To prepare, Data asks Dr. Crusher (Gates McFadden) to teach him how to dance. She instructs him in tap dance and ballroom dancing.

Meanwhile, the Enterprise is taking Vulcan ambassador T'Pel (Sierra Pecheur) to a secret meeting with a Romulan ship inside the neutral zone. T'Pel asks Data about the Enterprise's defense capabilities, but claims she was merely testing Data's security safeguards. During the Enterprise rendezvous with a Romulan warbird, the Devoras, T'Pel is seemingly killed during a transporter accident. Picard and the Romulan captain agree to both leave the Neutral Zone.

However, Data deduces that T'Pel was not really killed, and that the Romulans beamed her away and staged the accident. Picard returns to the Neutral Zone and intercepts the Romulans. He learns that T'Pel is actually a Romulan spy using the Enterprise to return to the Romulans. Multiple Romulan vessels enter the neutral zone and Picard retreats into Federation space.

Keiko agrees to proceed with the wedding. She and Miles are married by Captain Picard. Data notes that he understands the emotions of love and belonging.

== Production ==
This was the first episode with Data's cat, Spot. The cat is not actually named until a later appearance.

== Reception ==
Wired ranked "Data's Day" as one of the best of Star Trek: The Next Generation in a 2012 review. They praise masterful acting by Brent Spiner as Data throughout the episode, offering what they call a "Pinocchio perspective" on the plot. In 2019, ThoughtCo ranked "Data's Day" as the 7th best episode of this series, pointing out its special and emotional view of a day aboard the Enterprise-D.

In 2019, Den of Geek noted this episode for featuring romantic elements, pointing out the wedding of Chief Miles O'Brien and Keiko. This episode was noted by the Chicago Tribune in 1996 for introducing the character of Keiko as played by actress Rosalind Chao; she was also featured as a reoccurring character on Star Trek: Deep Space Nine.

This episode was noted in To Boldly Go: Essays on Gender and Identity in the Star Trek Universe for featuring the marriage of Keiko and O'Brien, which was the only successful long-term relationship in the entirety of Star Trek. They also note that their stories are continued on Star Trek: Deep Space Nine, and that they go on to have two children, Molly and Kirayoshi.

In 2019, Screen Rant ranked "Data's Day" the seventh funniest episode of Star Trek: The Next Generation.

In 2020, GameSpot recommended this episode for background on the character of Data.

In 2021, Tom's Guide said this was a more "personal" episode that helped give the Star Trek universe "a new sense of reality".

Tor Books gave it 7 out of 10.

== Home video ==
"Data's Day" was released in the United States on September 3, 2002, as part of the Star Trek: The Next Generation season four DVD box set.

On April 23, 1996, this was released on LaserDisc in the United States, paired with "The Wounded" on one double-sided 12 inch disc.
