= Chip Chalmers =

Theater and television director

- Occupations: Television and theater Director
- Years active: 1981–present
- Website: http://www.chipchalmers.com/index.htm

Chip Chalmers is a theater and television director.

== Biography ==
In 1979, "Chip Chalmers" became the production coordinator of 20th Century Fox Television in Los Angeles. In 1981, Chalmers entered the Directors Guild of America and worked as an assistant director till 1993. Chalmers was first assistant director for episodes of Melrose Place, The A-Team, Star Trek: The Next Generation and Miami Vice. Chalmers describes the ordeal as a "trial by fire." His directing debut was in 1989 with the Miami Vice episode "the Lost Madonna." Chalmers would go on to direct Star Trek: The Next Generation, Star Trek: Deep Space Nine, Mortal Kombat: Konquest and 7th Heaven. Chalmers Directed over 15 episodes of Beverly Hills, 90210 and 27 episodes of Melrose Place. The character "Captain Chip Chalmers" was featured in Star Trek: The Next Generation episode "The Wounded" to honor Chalmers' work in the series. In recent years, Chalmers worked in the film department at Florida State University. Chalmers is also a skilled magician and a member of The Academy of Magical Arts at Magic Castle in Hollywood.

== Directorial credits ==
Star Trek: The Next Generation

- "Ethics"
- "The Wounded"
- "The Loss"
- "Captain's Holiday"

Star Trek: Deep Space Nine

- "Take Me Out to the Holosuite"
- "The Magnificent Ferengi"

Mortal Kombat: Konquest

- "Twisted Truths"

Miami Vice

- "The Lost Madonna"

7th Heaven

- "Virgin"
- "Gossip"
