= The Wounded (Star Trek: The Next Generation) =

- Star Trek: The Next Generation episode
- Episode no.: Season 4 Episode 12
- Directed by: Chip Chalmers
- Story by: Stuart Charno; Sara Charno; Cy Chermak
- Teleplay by: Jeri Taylor
- Cinematography by: Marvin Rush
- Production code: 186
- Original air date: January 28, 1991

Guest appearances
- Bob Gunton - Capt. Benjamin Maxwell; Rosalind Chao - Keiko O'Brien; Marc Alaimo - Gul Macet; Colm Meaney - Miles O'Brien; Marco Rodríguez - Telle; Time Winters - Daro; John Hancock - Adm. Haden

Episode chronology
← Previous "Data's Day"	Next → "Devil's Due"
- Star Trek: The Next Generation season 4

"The Wounded" is the 86th episode of the syndicated American science fiction television series Star Trek: The Next Generation, the 12th episode of the fourth season.

Set in the 24th century, the series follows the adventures of the Starfleet crew of the Federation starship Enterprise-D. In this episode, Picard is shocked when the highly respected Captain Maxwell apparently turns renegade and begins destroying Cardassian vessels. Maxwell claims that the Cardassians, who recently signed a treaty with the Federation, are secretly rearming for war, but he has no proof. Picard demands that Maxwell—Transporter Chief O'Brien's former commanding officer—surrender his ship, but Maxwell refuses. Reluctant to fire on a fellow officer, Picard asks O'Brien to convince his old comrade to surrender peacefully.

This episode is noted for introducing the Cardassians, who would go on to have a major role in the Star Trek franchise.

== Plot ==
While on a mapping survey near Cardassian space, the starship Enterprise is suddenly attacked by a Cardassian vessel. Captain Picard (Patrick Stewart) is able to convince its commander, Gul Macet (Marc Alaimo), to stand down, and learns that Macet's attack was in retaliation for a Federation ship attacking a Cardassian science station two days prior. Picard confirms this with Starfleet, and is told that the starship Phoenix, commanded by Captain Benjamin Maxwell (Bob Gunton), was responsible, and is ordered to locate the vessel. Picard invites Gul Macet and two of his officers to come aboard as observers to maintain the fragile peace between the Federation and Cardassia. As the Enterprise looks for signs of the Phoenix, Picard discovers that transporter chief Miles O'Brien (Colm Meaney) was a former crewmember under Maxwell on the Rutledge during the Cardassian war, and invites him to join a briefing with Gul Macet. There, O'Brien reveals he still harbors some resentment for the Cardassians, revealing that Maxwell's family was killed by Cardassians. Gul Macet infers that Maxwell must be out for revenge, but O'Brien denies this.

The Enterprise locates the Phoenix on an intercept course for a Cardassian freighter, but they will not be able to reach it in time. Picard lets Gul Macet relay the position of the Phoenix to a closer Cardassian cruiser, but Maxwell outmaneuvers and destroys both the warship and the freighter, killing over 650 Cardassians.

Shortly thereafter, the Enterprise rendezvous with the Phoenix, and Maxwell transports aboard, greeting O'Brien as an old friend. Alone, Maxwell asserts to Picard that the Cardassians are re-arming themselves; the science station was a cover for a military base, and the freighters are carrying weapons. Picard admonishes Maxwell for his behavior unbecoming a Starfleet captain, and gains his assurance that he will pilot the Phoenix directly back to Federation space. However, en route, the Phoenix breaks course towards another freighter. Maxwell is poised to destroy the freighter, demanding that the Federation officers be allowed aboard to see proof of the Cardassians' deception. The Enterprise crew notes that the freighter is equipped with a field that blocks their scans. Picard prepares to fire on the Phoenix to maintain the peace, but O'Brien requests permission to beam over to the Phoenix, using a transporter trick to sneak past its shield, and talk to Maxwell. Maxwell reveals to O'Brien his unresolved anger at the Cardassians for destroying his family. Aboard the Phoenix, O'Brien and Maxwell reminisce about their time aboard the Rutledge and sing a song from their past (The Minstrel Boy). Because Maxwell realizes he will not be able to win his private war; O'Brien is able to convince Maxwell to stand down. Maxwell transfers his command to his first officer and the Phoenix starts its return to Federation space, while Maxwell returns to the Enterprise with O'Brien, to be held there pending return to Starfleet.

As the Cardassian observers are returned to their ship, Picard cautions them that while Maxwell's actions may have been improper, his suspicions are not without merit; the so-called "science station" is located in a strategic military position with little scientific value, and the shields on the freighters were specifically designed to block Federation scanning. He cautions Gul Macet that the Federation will be watching the Cardassians very closely in the future.

== Production ==
The Cardassian uniform costumes were designed by Robert Blackman. The makeup for the Cardassians was developed by Michael Westmore.

== Notes ==
- "The Wounded" introduces a new species of aliens, the Cardassians, who would become a major element of the series Star Trek: Deep Space Nine.
- This episode was the first to feature Colm Meaney's character Miles O'Brien in a prominent role. It makes reference to O'Brien's history with the Cardassians, and the massacre at Setlik III which would be touched upon again several times during the run of Star Trek: Deep Space Nine, where it would be revealed that O'Brien was known as "the hero of Setlik III" and repaired a transporter for the first time while rescuing several of his shipmates.
- The song "The Minstrel Boy" returns as a leitmotif for O'Brien in "What You Leave Behind", the series finale of Star Trek: Deep Space Nine.
- Gul Macet was played by Marc Alaimo in his third appearance on The Next Generation. He would go on to portray another Cardassian, Gul Dukat, a recurring character and primary antagonist on Deep Space Nine. It also marks the only appearance of a Cardassian with facial hair.

== Reception ==
Empire ranked "The Wounded" the 31st best out of the top 50 episodes of all the 700-plus Star Trek television episodes. This film magazine notes that Captain Picard must juggle the difficulties of a renegade Starfleet captain, as political and military considerations pile up on the border between war and peace with the newly-introduced Cardassians. Gizmodo rated "The Wounded" the 80th greatest episode of Star Trek. Business Insider listed "The Wounded" as one of the most underrated episodes of the Star Trek franchise at that time.

Den of Geek ranked it in the top 25 "must watch" episodes of Star Trek: The Next Generation.

TrekMovie.com suggested it as viewing for Saint Patrick's Day due to its Irish content, in particular for Captain Maxwell and Miles O'Brien's rendition of the Irish ballad "The Minstrel Boy".

Regarding Starfleet's Benjamin Maxwell, IGN ranked Maxwell as the 25th best character of Star Trek. Wired ranked Maxwell as the 94th most important Starfleet character in the Star Trek universe.

== Home video ==
This episode was released in the United States on September 3, 2002, as part of the Star Trek: The Next Generation season four DVD box set.

On April 23, 1996, this was released on LaserDisc in the United States, paired with "Data's Day" on one double-sided 12 inch disc.

CBS announced on September 28, 2011, in celebration of the series' twenty-fifth anniversary, that Star Trek: The Next Generation would be completely re-mastered in 1080p high definition from the original 35mm film negatives. For the remaster almost 25,000 reels of original film stock were rescanned and reedited, and all visual effects were digitally recomposed from original large-format negatives and newly created CGI shots. The release was accompanied by 7.1 DTS Master Audio. On July 30, 2013 "The Wounded" was released on 1080p high definition as part of the Season 4 Blu-ray box set in the United States. The set was released on July 29, 2013, in the United Kingdom.

== See also ==
- "Defiant": a Deep Space Nine third season episode depicting a similar pursuit of a Maquis-commandeered USS Defiant's incursion into Cardassian space.
- "Chain Of Command": a The Next Generation sixth season two-part episode, in which the Cardassians attempt an incursion on a disputed planet.
