= Miles O'Brien (Star Trek) =

Fictional character from the Star Trek universe

- The Next Generation / Deep Space Nine character
- First appearance: "Encounter at Farpoint" (1987) (The Next Generation)
- Last appearance: "What You Leave Behind" (1999) (Deep Space Nine)
- Created by: Gene Roddenberry; D. C. Fontana
- Portrayed by: Colm Meaney

In-universe information
- Species: Human
- Gender: Male
- Position: Professor of Engineering (Starfleet Academy); Chief Operations Officer (Deep Space Nine); Chief Engineer (USS Defiant); Chief Petty Officer; later Lieutenant (USS Enterprise-D – TNG Season 2 Episode 2); Head Transporter Operator (USS Enterprise-D – TNG Seasons 1–6); Helmsman (USS Enterprise-D – TNG Season 1); Tactical Officer (USS Rutledge – TNG prior to episode "The Wounded"
- Affiliation: United Federation of Planets; Starfleet
- Family: Michael O'Brien (father); Brian Boru (ancestor)
- Spouse: Keiko O'Brien
- Children: Molly O'Brien; Kirayoshi O'Brien
- Origin: Killarney, County Kerry, Ireland, Earth

Miles Edward O'Brien is a character in the Star Trek franchise, portrayed by actor Colm Meaney. O'Brien was originally the head transporter operator for the USS Enterprise-D, with a recurring role in all seven seasons of Star Trek: The Next Generation. Promoted to chief of operations for Deep Space Nine, O'Brien became a principal character on the series of the same name. Portrayed in 225 episodes overall, O'Brien is the Star Trek character with the second most appearances in the franchise (exceeded only by Worf, portrayed by Michael Dorn).

O'Brien is the only major Star Trek character described as both ethnically Irish and born in Ireland; Colm Meaney, the actor who portrays him, is Irish. He is also the only regular Star Trek character to be a non-commissioned officer.

== Early appearances ==
According to Colm Meaney, at first O'Brien "was just there, not really established as a character, and that went on for a bit." He has a few lines in the pilot episode of Star Trek: The Next Generation. Appearing on and off in subsequent episodes, mainly operating the ship's transporters, it was not until a second-season episode that Meaney's character was named, and the second episode of season 4 before the character's first name (Note: Rick Berman has stated the character was named Miles after his nephew.) was indicated and his personal life began to be developed. However, Meaney came to like the arrangement of being hired on an episode-by-episode basis, and was hesitant to sign on as a regular on Deep Space Nine. Miles O'Brien is the first of two characters that moved from The Next Generation to be a main character on Deep Space Nine, followed by Worf after The Next Generation ended.

== Character postings ==
- USS Rutledge
  - Junior tactical officer
- Setlik III – skirmish with Cardassian forces during the Cardassian/Federation War
- USS Enterprise-D
  - Conn officer
  - Head Transporter Operator
  - Operations and engineering
  - Acting tactical officer
- Deep Space Nine (Federation administered Bajoran station)
  - Chief of Operations
  - Chief Engineer USS Defiant (support starship assigned to Deep Space Nine)
- Starfleet Academy – San Francisco, California, Earth
  - Professor of Engineering

== Character story ==
=== Backstory ===
Miles O'Brien was born in Killarney, County Kerry, Ireland, Earth, in September 2328. His father, Michael O'Brien, wanted him to play the cello, so he pursued this and was eventually accepted into the Aldebaran Music Academy. However, a few days before he was scheduled to start classes there, he enlisted in Starfleet. O'Brien plays a cello as part of Data's string quartet. He has two brothers.

O'Brien served as tactical officer aboard the USS Rutledge during the Cardassian War. He was emotionally scarred by the Cardassians' massacre of hundreds of civilians on Setlik III. O'Brien does not remember how many Cardassians he killed, because he killed "so many". (Note: In that episode, it is clear that the classic Irish tune "The Minstrel Boy" plays a major part of his journey as a character: an innocent man thrown into the destructive nature of war. He sings the song in this episode, and much later, in the final episode of Star Trek: Deep Space Nine, "The Minstrel Boy" is the first musical theme to be heard in the flashback sequence.)

O'Brien jokingly claims to be a direct descendant of real-life Irish High King Brian Boru (according to Irish tradition, all people with the surname "O'Brien" are Boru's descendants). Later, he speaks more seriously of fictional ancestor Sean Aloysius O'Brien, a major player in one of the first US workers' unions, who participated in the Coal Strike of 1902 in Pennsylvania and was shot then dumped into the Allegheny River. A point of pride, he spoke about how he was from a long line of Union Men. During O'Brien's 22 years in Starfleet, he had fought in 235 separate battles and had been decorated by Starfleet on 15 occasions, and was considered to be an expert in starship combat, by both Starfleet and Klingon authorities.

=== Depiction in Star Trek: The Next Generation ===
O'Brien's first appearance in Star Trek: The Next Generation was in the series premiere episode as the battle bridge flight controller. In his only other appearance in the first season, he is a security guard. Starting with the second-season premiere, O'Brien has his regular role as the ship's transporter operator. In the following episode, when Riker and Worf prepare to beam to the USS Yamato, Riker refers to O'Brien as a lieutenant (and he is wearing lieutenant collar pips). He still wears lieutenant pips in a subsequent episode, but in later episodes, the collar symbol has changed, and O'Brien is referred to simply as Chief. (See "Rank" below).

In 2367, O'Brien confronts his former commanding officer Capt. Benjamin Maxwell on the USS Rutledge when Maxwell attacks Cardassian ships and outposts without authorisation which threatens the peace between the Federation and the Cardassian Union.

During the Klingon Civil War, O'Brien is assigned to the bridge as tactical officer due to Worf's resignation from Starfleet and the temporary reassignment of officers to other ships in a fleet led by Capt. Picard.

O'Brien marries Keiko Ishikawa aboard the USS Enterprise-D. They have a daughter, Molly, who is delivered by Worf. Shortly after Molly's birth, O'Brien is one of three Starfleet personnel who are possessed by evil spirits; they hold Keiko and Molly hostage.

O'Brien appears in over 50 episodes of Star Trek: The Next Generation.

=== Depiction in Star Trek: Deep Space Nine ===
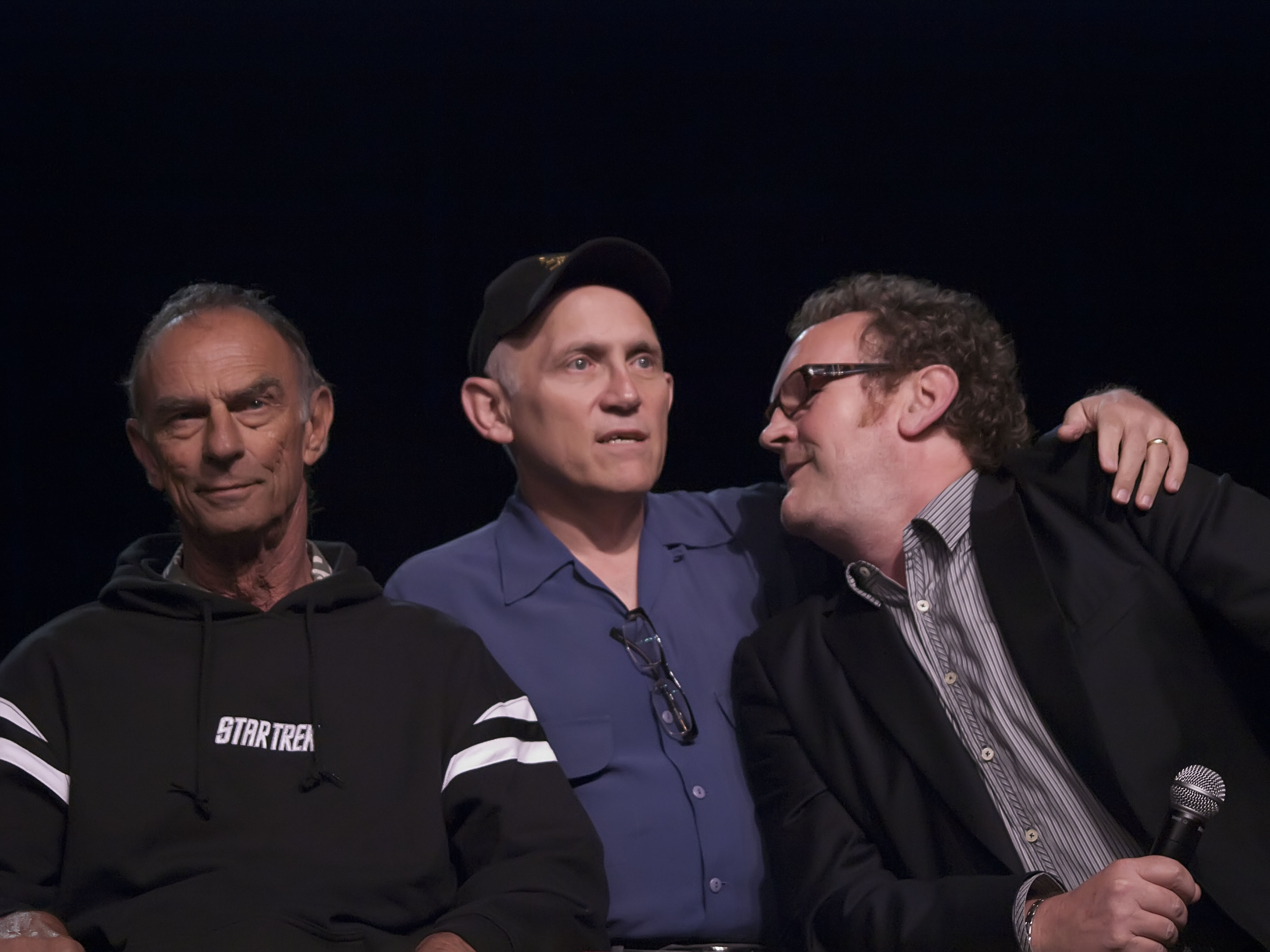
Colm Meaney (right) with Deep Space 9 co-stars Marc Alaimo (left) and Armin Shimerman (center), who portrayed the characters of Gul Dukat and Quark, respectively

The character of Miles O'Brien was transplanted from Star Trek: The Next Generation to Star Trek: Deep Space Nine at the beginning of the latter show. In the Deep Space Nine premiere episode, Miles O'Brien transfers from the Enterprise-D to Deep Space Nine to serve as the station's chief of operations. He would later assume an additional role as chief engineer of the USS Defiant, which is assigned to Deep Space Nine.

O'Brien's character is unusual among Star Trek main characters. As well as being a non-commissioned officer, he is also a family man with a wife and children. He is often portrayed as being less patrician, and more pragmatic and down-to-earth than his colleagues. The producers would routinely put O'Brien under intense psychological pressure. (Note: These episodes are jokingly dubbed "O'Brien must suffer".) O'Brien was regularly chosen for such storylines because it was felt people could empathise with him. For example, he is falsely convicted of espionage and given the simulated memory of a 20-year prison sentence; in another episode, he repeatedly time-travels into the future, witnessing his own death and the destruction of Deep Space Nine.

While stationed at Deep Space Nine, O'Brien meets Dr. Julian Bashir, who initially irritates him, but the two characters eventually become best friends. In particular, they frequently play darts and fight historical battles in the holosuites.

In 2373, his son, Kirayoshi, is born, delivered by surrogate Kira Nerys. His wife Keiko helps rescue her husband. Ironically Miles has to rescue his wife who has been possessed by a Pagh Wraith in a nearly successful attempt to destroy the Prophets; Miles instead directs the energy charge at Keiko which destroys the evil spirit and freed his wife.

After an undercover assignment infiltrating the Orion Syndicate, O'Brien adopts Chester, a cat previously owned by Bilby, a man who he grew close to during the mission.

At the end of Deep Space Nine, O'Brien and his family depart the station to move back to Earth, where he is to serve as an engineering professor at Starfleet Academy.

O'Brien is briefly mentioned in Star Trek: Lower Decks as the "most important person in Starfleet history" during a brief cutaway to the far future.

=== Mirror Universe ===
Miles O'Brien of the Mirror Universe was a Terran slave who worked for the Klingon-Cardassian Alliance aboard station Terok Nor. In 2370, O'Brien was working in the station's ore processing center. O'Brien was also occasionally recruited to repair Benjamin Sisko's raider when it was docked at the station. Sisko claimed he hated the name Miles, and instead nicknamed O'Brien "Smiley". Miles was known on the station for being an excellent "tinkerer and putterer".

When Smiley met a Julian Bashir from another universe in the ore processing center, he initially thought that Bashir's "wild" tales of his counterpart being Chief of Operations was simply a ruse to get him to help Bashir. However, Bashir was able to persuade him to help after he realised that anything had to be better than being a slave. Smiley agreed to help Bashir try to escape from the station only if he could go back with him to the other universe. When Captain Sisko defied Intendant Kira Nerys who commanded the station, Smiley changed his mind and decided to join Sisko's crew, deciding that there was something worth staying for after all.

When Mirror Sisko was killed by the Alliance in early 2371, Smiley took charge of the Terran Rebellion. To complete Sisko's last mission, he recruited Benjamin Sisko to take the place of his deceased counterpart long enough to convince Jennifer Sisko to leave the Alliance and start working for the Rebellion.

While he was aboard Deep Space 9, Smiley took the opportunity to download a large portion of the station's database, including the schematics for the USS Defiant. Smiley used the stolen specifications to build a warship, which they named Defiant. After the rebels managed to capture Terok Nor from the Alliance, the Alliance prepared to recapture the station. Smiley once again recruited Sisko to help them finish construction of the Defiant in time. After successfully defending the station, Smiley sent Sisko home.

In 2375, Smiley commands the Defiant when it pursues Brunt's ship as it steals a cloaking device from the station. Smiley later negotiates Regent Worf's surrender and capture.

=== Rank ===
During the story progression of The Next Generation and Deep Space Nine, O'Brien's rank and insignia were inconsistent until it was firmly established for Deep Space Nine. He first appears with one silver-rimmed black pip then full lieutenant insignia consisting of two gold pips and then one gold-rimmed black pip. Sergey Rozhenko calls him a Chief Petty Officer in an episode (perhaps mistakenly), but in previous episodes O'Brien was indicated to be a lieutenant. Eventually, O'Brien receives a distinct senior chief petty officer's insignia, and his rank is emphatically identified.

== Actor commentary ==
In interviews, Colm Meaney has praised the writing of the character, and noted "there was a terrific kind of humanity in O'Brien".

== Reception ==
In 2009, IGN rated O'Brien the 17th best character of all Star Trek up to that time. In 2012, TrekMovie.com recommended the episode "The Wounded" for Saint Patrick's Day, praising O'Brien's rendition of the Irish ballad "Minstrel Boy". In 2016, O'Brien was ranked as the 17th most important character of Starfleet within the Star Trek science fiction universe by Wired magazine. In 2017, IndieWire ranked O'Brien as the 13th best character on Star Trek: The Next Generation. In 2018, Comic Book Resources ranked O'Brien the 15th best Starfleet character of Star Trek.

Screen Rant in 2016 rated O'Brien as the 20th best character in Star Trek overall as presented in television and film up to that time, highlighting the character's role in episodes such as "Hard Time", "Tribunal", "The Wounded", and "Time’s Orphan". In 2020, Screen Rant ranked O'Brien one of the top five most likeable characters on the Star Trek: Deep Space Nine. In addition, they ranked him and Keiko as the 5th best romantic couple of all Star Trek.

In March 2020, O'Brien was praised as a positive depiction of Irish culture in media by Irish media company Entertainment.ie. In particular they noted he had a Dublin accent and praised Meaney's overall presentation of Irishness.
