= List of Star Trek characters (A–F) =

Characters in the science fiction epic

This article lists characters of Star Trek in their various canonical incarnations. This includes fictional major characters and fictional minor characters created for Star Trek, fictional characters not originally created for Star Trek, and real-life persons appearing in a fictional manner, such as holodeck re-creations.

== Characters from all series, listed alphabetically ==
=== Key ===
Abbreviation	Title	Date(s)	Medium
TC	"The Cage" (Star Trek: The Original Series)	1966	TV
TOS	Star Trek: The Original Series	1966–1969	TV
TAS	Star Trek: The Animated Series	1973–1974	TV
TMP	Star Trek: The Motion Picture	1979	film
TWOK	Star Trek II: The Wrath of Khan	1982	film
TSFS	Star Trek III: The Search for Spock	1984	film
TVH	Star Trek IV: The Voyage Home	1986	film
TFF	Star Trek V: The Final Frontier	1989	film
TUC	Star Trek VI: The Undiscovered Country	1991	film
TNG	Star Trek: The Next Generation	1987–1994	TV
DS9	Star Trek: Deep Space Nine	1993–1999	TV
GEN	Star Trek Generations	1994	film
VOY	Star Trek: Voyager	1995–2001	TV
FC	Star Trek: First Contact	1996	film
INS	Star Trek: Insurrection	1998	film
NEM	Star Trek: Nemesis	2002	film
ENT	Star Trek: Enterprise	2001–2005	TV
ST09	Star Trek (2009)	2009	film
STID	Star Trek Into Darkness	2013	film
STB	Star Trek Beyond	2016	film
DSC	Star Trek: Discovery	2017–2024	TV
SHO	Star Trek: Short Treks	2018–2020	TV
PIC	Star Trek: Picard	2020–2023	TV
LOW	Star Trek: Lower Decks	2020–2024	TV
PRO	Star Trek: Prodigy	2021–2024	TV
SNW	Star Trek: Strange New Worlds	2022–present	TV
S31	Star Trek: Section 31	2025	film
SFA	Star Trek: Starfleet Academy	2026–present	TV

Bajoran characters are listed by family name, which is stated first.

Joined Trills are listed by the name of the symbiont, which replaces the family name.

=== A ===
Character	Actor	Appearances	Description
Leonard James Akaar	Ben Gage	Friday's Child (TOS)	Son of the late Teer Akaar and his widow Eleen on the planet Capella IV. Born 2267 shortly after his father was killed in a Klingon-induced power struggle, he was named after James T. Kirk and Leonard McCoy, who helped to resolve the local conflict. Leonard James Akaar inherited the title of "teer," or chief, of the Ten Tribes of Capella IV. His mother served as regent until the boy came of age to rule. In the novels, Akaar (who was eventually forced to flee Capella with his mother due to another coup) grows up and joins Starfleet; we first see him serving as chief of security on the USS Excelsior under Captain Hikaru Sulu. Later, in the Star Trek: Deep Space Nine relaunch novels, Akaar is a veteran admiral in the fleet.
Nahla Ake	Holly Hunter	Kids These Days (SFA)	Part human, part Lanthanite and a former Starfleet captain who resigns after being forced to follow the law over her own conscience and separate a mother from her young child in 3180. Fifteen years later, Ake is approached to assume the role of Chancellor for the recommissioned Starfleet Academy.
Akorem Laan	Richard Libertini	Accession (DS9)	Bajoran poet best known for The Call of the Prophets. Traveling in a Bajoran lightship, Akorem was the first to find the Celestial Temple (the wormhole to the Gamma Quadrant); when he emerged about 200 years later, Benjamin Sisko gave up his title of Emissary so that Akorem could take it, a decision Sisko regretted when Akorem advocated a return to the D'Jarras (the Bajoran caste system). Sisko and Akorem went to the wormhole together, and the Prophets decided to send Akorem back to his time and reinstate Sisko as their Emissary.
Joshua Albert	None (Only discussed, never seen.)	The First Duty (TNG) (mentioned)	Starfleet Academy cadet and friend of Wesley Crusher, a fellow team member with Crusher in Nova Squadron under Nicholas Locarno; Albert died during his squadron's rehearsal of a banned flight maneuver intended to impress the academy's commencement ceremony attendees.
Ves Alkur	Chip Lucia	Man of the People (Star Trek: The Next Generation)	Lumerian ambassador who uses women as "receptacles" for his negative emotions which causes the "receptacles" to die of old age. Deanna Troi almost dies but it is Alkur who receives back the negativity and dies of old age.
Various aliens	Bill Blair	Tribunal (DS9) (recurring thereafter)	Various aliens and Starfleet officers played by background actor Bill Blair in 45 episodes of DS9, 2 episodes of VOY and 4 of ENT.
Alixus	Gail Strickland	Paradise (DS9)	Leader of a colony that settled on planet Orellius in 2360, responsible for several deaths because she rejected any form of technologically based medicine.
Almak	Off-screen voiceover by an unknown performer	Message in a Bottle (VOY)	Romulan subcommander of the IRW T'Met. He leads two other Warbirds to take possession of the USS Prometheus NX-59650, an experimental prototype Federation starship, from its Romulan hijacker, Commander Rekar. However, Almak's fleet opens fire on the Prometheus when he learns that Rekar is no longer in control of it.
Aluura	Symba Smith	Profit and Lace (DS9)	A Dabo girl who worked at Quark's in 2374.
Kiaphet Amman'sor	None	The Xindi (ENT) (recurring thereafter)	A female aquatic Xindi. She is a member of the Ibix dynasty, and the head aquatic on the Xindi Council.
Ancient Humanoid	Salome Jens	The Chase (TNG)	A holographic projection of a member of the race from which Humans, Klingons, Romulans, Cardassians and numerous other Alpha Quadrant species descend
Brett Anderson	Terry Serpico	The Vulcan Hello, Battle at the Binary Stars (DSC)	Admiral in Starfleet in command of the fleet during the battle at the binary stars against the Klingons. After ostensibly agreeing on a truce the Klingons ram the Admiral's vessel Europa with a cloaked ship forcing him to initiate the self-destruct sequence destroying the Europa along with the Klingon vessel.
Anya	Paddi Edwards	The Dauphin (TNG)	A shapeshifting allasomorph native to the third moon of Daled IV who served as guardian of the planet's leader, Salia, while she was being transported on the Enterprise-D. To the Enterprise crew, Anya assumed the form of an older human woman; her intrinsic appearance is unknown.
Apollo	Michael Forest	Who Mourns for Adonais? (TOS)	Extraterrestrial alien believed to be a god by ancient Greeks, who in the 23rd century captures the Enterprise and demands its crew build a society on planet Pollux IV to worship him.
Robert T. April	James Doohan (voice)	The Counter-Clock Incident (TAS)	First captain of the USS Enterprise (NCC-1701) during its initial five-year mission. April, later a commodore, was succeeded by Christopher Pike. April appears in a single TAS episode, and in the novels Final Frontier and Best Destiny by Diane Carey as the captain of the Enterprise
Sarah April	Nichelle Nichols (voice)	The Counter-Clock Incident (TAS)	Wife of Starfleet officer Robert T. April and chief medical officer of the USS Enterprise (NCC-1701) when her husband was captain.
Jonathan Archer	Scott Bakula	Broken Bow (recurring thereafter) (ENT)	Captain of the USS Enterprise (NX-01).
Ardra	Marta DuBois	Devil's Due (TNG)	According to the theology of Ventax II, Ardra was a mythic being from the distant past who promised the population a thousand years of prosperity, followed by enslavement upon her return at the end of that epoch. In 2367, a female con artist was unmasked by Enterprise-D personnel after deceiving the Ventaxians into believing she was the deity by using technology to mimic various phenomena believed to herald Ardra's return.
Arex	James Doohan (voice)	Beyond the Farthest Star (TAS) (recurring thereafter)	Lieutenant Arex, voiced by James Doohan, was a recurring character on Star Trek: The Animated Series which ran on NBC from 1973 to 1974. The series' writers and artists were able to create his unique alien look because the series was animated; creating such a character with a live-action actor in make-up would not have been feasible. The character was later used in Star Trek novels and comics. Arex was a Starfleet officer assigned to the USS Enterprise as navigator. Arex was a member of a tripedal species (given as "Edosians" in Alan Dean Foster's novelizations of the animated episodes, but as "Triexians" in Peter David's New Frontier series) and had three arms and legs. Arex also sometimes took the conn, but he rarely left the ship on landing party missions due to his bizarre appearance.
Argyle	Biff Yeager	Where No One Has Gone Before (TNG); Datalore (TNG)	A chief engineer aboard the Enterprise-D who supervised the engine modifications made by two specialists, also assembled the android Lore with the help of Dr. Beverly Crusher.
Armus	Mart McChesney; Ron Gans (voice)	Skin of Evil (TNG); The Spy Humongous (LOW)	Sentient viscous black liquid (the by-product of a procedure in which a race of "titans" shed all their evil and negative attributes) that killed Tasha Yar.
Dr. Arridor	Dan Shor	The Price (TNG), False Profits (VOY)	Member of a Ferengi delegation sent to negotiate for the rights to the Barzan wormhole in 2366 who becomes stranded in the Delta Quadrant until his encounter with the starship Voyager.
Arturis	Ray Wise	Hope and Fear (VOY)	Alien with exceptional linguistic capability who poses as a friend to Voyager helping them recover a badly garbled transmission from the Alpha Quadrant but uses the opportunity to set up a trap for the entire crew to be assimilated by the Borg
Askwith	Rafael Boza	The Forge (ENT)	Starfleet corporal at the United Earth Embassy on Vulcan in 2154. After its bombing, Ambassador Soval performed a mind meld with Askwith and learned that Chief Investigator Stel was responsible for bringing the explosive into the embassy.
Jeremy Aster	Gabriel Damon	The Bonding (TNG)	Human civilian, orphaned when his mother, Marla Aster, an officer aboard the USS Enterprise-D was killed in 2366 on an away mission.
Marla Aster	Susan Powell	The Bonding (TNG)	Archaeologist aboard the Enterprise-D, and mother of Jeremy Aster. Killed on an away mission in 2366.
Mr. Atoz	Ian Wolfe	All Our Yesterdays (TOS)	Librarian and keeper of the Atavachron time-portal device on the planet Sarpeidon.
Atul	Dennis Madalone	Visionary (DS9)	Klingon officer and one of three members of a covert strike force conducting surveillance of the Romulan delegation to Starbase Deep Space 9 in 2371. He is the last of his party to be thrown into the brig.
Axum	Mark Deakins	Unimatrix Zero (VOY)	Borg drone aboard a vessel in the Beta Quadrant who, while regenerating, due to a recessive gene is able to enter the virtual world of Unimatrix Zero as a free individual and meet with others, including Annika Hansen, like himself. He entertained an intimate relationship with Seven of Nine within Unimatrix Zero until her rescue from the Borg hive by the USS Voyager. Since the Borg Queen is aware of Unimatrix Zero trying to find a way to destroy it for good, Axum contacts Seven of Nine to help them. Axum gets a chance to rekindle their love until Unimatrix Zero is shut down.
Ayala	Tarik Ergin	Caretaker, Part I (VOY) (recurring thereafter)	Security officer aboard the USS Voyager and former member of the Maquis
Azetbur	Rosanna DeSoto	TUC	Daughter of Klingon Chancellor Gorkon, Azetbur ascended to the chancellorship herself when her father was assassinated in 2293. She is essential for the signing of the Khitomer Accords, the first peace treaty between the Federation and the Klingon Empire.

=== B ===
Character	Actor	Appearances	Description
B-4	Brent Spiner	NEM, Remembrance and The Bounty (PIC)	B-4 was first seen in the movie Star Trek: Nemesis. He is a Soong-type android (named after Dr. Noonien Soong, their creator). B-4 is one of three androids built by Dr. Soong before Lore and Data. Praetor Shinzon of Remus was able to obtain the disassembled B-4 and placed some special programming into him, so he could infiltrate the USS Enterprise-E to gain tactical information of the Federation from the ship. B-4 briefly reappears in Star Trek: Picard where it's revealed that he was ultimately disassembled, but Doctors Altan Soong and Bruce Maddox had used the remnants of Data inside of his positronic network to build a new race of androids. Parts of B-4 were later included by Soong in a new android, alongside Data, Lore, and Lal with B-4 briefly speaking through the android. After taking full control of the android, Data said that B-4 was now a part of him.
Badar N'D'D	Marc Alaimo	Lonely Among Us (TNG)	Antican delegate to the summit with the Selay on Parliament. (Note: Character name comes from the script.)
Bahrat	Carlos Carrasco	Fair Trade (VOY)	Heavy-handed manager of the Nekrit Supply Depot located near the border of the Nekrit Expanse. Bahrat insisted on a 20 percent commission on trades taking place at his station.
Lt. Baji	Juliet Cesario	Skin of Evil (TNG) (recurring thereafter)	Female operations/science division officer, who served aboard the Enterprise-D from 2364 to 2365. She was working on the bridge during the rescue mission for Counselor Troi on Vagra II (Skin of Evil), was on duty on the aft section of the bridge when the Enterprise-D took Thadiun Okona aboard and had to handle the differences between Straleb and Atlec (The Outrageous Okona), was working in sickbay when Dr. Pulaski treated Geordi La Forge and told him about surgery to bring back his eyesight (Loud as a Whisper) and was treating several patients in the sickbay following several system malfunctions caused by an Iconian probe (Contagion). (The actress received no credit for her appearances. According to the IMDb, Wikipedia, and Cesario herself this character was named Lt. Baji.)
Lyndsay Ballard	Kim Rhodes	Ashes to Ashes (VOY)	Voyager crewmember who died on an away mission in the Delta Quadrant and then was reanimated by the Kobali.
Balok	Clint Howard	The Corbomite Maneuver (TOS)	Diminutive alien commander of the First Federation starship Fesarius who captures the Enterprise and tests its crew through the use of an intimidating puppet (voiced by Ted Cassidy)
Arctus Baran	Richard Lynch	Gambit (TNG)	Captain of a mercenary ship raiding archeological sites for specific artifacts to re-form an ancient Vulcan weapon
Barash	Dana Tjowander	Future Imperfect (TNG)	A solitary child from an undetermined species who, desperate for a companion, used an illusory world to entrap William Riker in his specially modified cave on Alpha Onias III. Riker eventually saw through the young alien's illusions and brought Barash back to the Enterprise-D with him.
Reginald Barclay	Dwight Schultz	Hollow Pursuits (TNG) (recurring thereafter), FCT, Projections (VOY) (recurring thereafter)	Although he may appear to be nervous and lacking in confidence, Reginald "Reg" Barclay is a highly talented Starfleet systems diagnostic engineer. Stationed aboard the Enterprise-D from 2366, Barclay had a tendency to spend more time inside the holodeck than in real social situations. He also suffered from severe transporter phobia in 2369, although he seems to have overcome this psychological barrier. He also spent time at Jupiter Station as Dr. Lewis Zimmerman's assistant on his EMH project. While stationed aboard the USS Enterprise-E in 2373, and through a strange turn of events involving the Borg, Barclay was able to meet one of his idols, Zefram Cochrane. By 2376, Barclay's main focus was developing a means of communicating with the missing USS Voyager still stranded in the Delta Quadrant.
Professor Honey Bare	Terry Farrell	Our Man Bashir (DS9)	Although a holographic character in Julian Bashir's secret agent holosuite program, Professor Bare took on the look of Jadzia Dax during a malfunction. Bare was reputedly Earth's top seismologist in 1964, the year the program was set.
Bareil Antos	Philip Anglim	In the Hands of the Prophets (DS9) (recurring thereafter)	Bajoran Vedek who was nominated as possible successor to Kai Opaka, but lost the position to Kai Winn instead. Love interest of Kira Nerys (until his death).
Barstow	Richard Derr	The Alternative Factor (TOS)	Starfleet commodore at Starfleet Command who contacts the Enterprise an hour after the disruption/distortion effects emanated from the dead planet the starship is orbiting. Barstow wants to know whether they are natural phenomena or mechanically generated, and, if the latter, by whom and for what purpose. He charges Kirk with finding out the specifics, but cannot assign reserve starships to help the Enterprise because he is evacuating all Starfleet units and personnel within 100 parsecs of her position.
Regina Bartholomew	Stephanie Beacham	Ship in a Bottle (TNG)	Holographic love interest of the holographic Professor Moriarty in Data's Sherlock Holmes program
Amsha Bashir	Fadwa El Guindi	Doctor Bashir, I Presume? (DS9)	Human female; wife of Richard Bashir, and mother of Julian Bashir.
Julian Bashir	Alexander Siddig	Emissary (DS9) (recurring thereafter), Birthright (TNG)	Human male; Chief Medical Officer of Deep Space Nine.
Richard Bashir	Brian George	Doctor Bashir, I Presume? (DS9)	Human male; husband of Amsha Bashir, and father of Julian Bashir. In 2348, he took his then 6-year-old son to a planet outside the Federation to have him genetically enhanced. When the fact came out in the open about three decades later, Richard accepted a plea bargain of a 2-year prison sentence to save Julian's career.
Marta Batanides	J. C. Brandy	Tapestry (TNG)	Human female; Jean-Luc Picard's Academy classmate. In an alternate timeline created by Q, she and Picard had a romantic relationship.
Morgan Bateson	Kelsey Grammer	Cause and Effect (TNG)	Commanding officer of the 23rd century Federation starship USS Bozeman, which became trapped in a temporal causality loop near the Typhon Expanse in 2278. Bateson and his crew emerged in 2368, unaware they had passed through 90 years of time, until Captain Picard of the USS Enterprise-D set them straight.
Gabriel Bell	John Lendale Bennett; Avery Brooks	Past Tense (DS9)	Human male (April 24, 1987 – September 3, 2024); during a 2024 revolt in San Francisco where federal employees were held hostage, Bell made sure the hostages were not harmed. In the Deep Space Nine episode "Past Tense", he is killed earlier and a time-travelling Benjamin Sisko steps in to fulfill Bell's role in the pivotal historical moment. In a guidebook to Earth that Jake gave to Nog, Gabriel Bell is described as "the father of Earth's post-modern reformism," and shown with a picture of Sisko.
Belle	Lindsey Haun	Real Life (VOY)	Holographic female; the Doctor's daughter in his holographic family program, killed after B'Elanna changes the Doctor's program.
Benaren	Michael L. Maguire	Before and After (VOY)	Ocampan male; father of Kes, husband of Martis.
Ensign Bennett	Tim McCormack	Encounter at Farpoint (TNG) (recurring thereafter)	Ensign Bennett was a Starfleet helmsman aboard the USS Enterprise-D from 2364 to 2370. He was a background character, appearing in a total of 54 episodes, but the actor was never credited.
Benzan	Kieran Mulroney	The Outrageous Okona (TNG)	Son of Secretary Kushell from the planet Straleb, entrusting Thadiun Okona with delivering the family's heirloom, the Jewel of Thesia, as a wedding gift to his future wife Yanar of the planet Atlec in 2365.
Beta XII-A entity	None	Day of the Dove (TOS)	Non-corporeal alien entity deriving sustenance from violent emotions such as hate and fear in others; attempts to pit Klingons and Enterprise personnel against each other in endless combat
B'Etor	Gwynyth Walsh	Redemption (TNG), Firstborn (TNG), Past Prologue (DS9), GEN	Klingon female; one of the Duras sisters. Time magazine rated B'Etor with her sister Lursa, as the 2nd best villain of the Star Trek franchise in 2016.
Bill	Leon Russom	TUC	Starfleet admiral who serves as C-in-C in 2293, two months after the Klingon moon Praxis explodes. He tasks Kirk with being the Federation's "olive branch" in escorting the Klingon chancellor, Gorkon, to peace negotiations on Earth. He is addressed in dialogue only as "Bill," but he is credited as "Starfleet Chief in Command." (Noncanon: In the movie novelization, he is called "Rear Admiral William Smillie".)
Admiral Black	Gregory Itzin	In a Mirror, Darkly (ENT)	Starfleet admiral in the Mirror Universe killed by Commander Jonathan Archer when not given command of the Defiant
Margaret Blackwell	Nancy Vawter	The Pegasus (TNG)	Starfleet vice admiral who ordered the Enterprise-D to rendezvous with the Starship Crazy Horse and pick up Rear Admiral Erik Pressman. She also managed to embarrass Picard somewhat by asking about the nature of the "Captain Picard Day".
Bob	Harve Bennett	TFF	Starfleet admiral who, in 2287, tasks Kirk with rescuing the Federation, Klingon and Romulan hostages on Nimbus III. He is addressed in dialogue only as "Bob", but he is credited as "Starfleet Chief of Staff". (Noncanon: In the movie novelization, he is called "Admiral Robert Caflisch". However, the Paramount-Pictures-sanctioned reference text The Star Trek Encyclopedia, by Michael Okuda and Denise Okuda, has retconned the character's name to "Admiral Robert Bennett".)
Bochra	John Snyder	The Enemy (TNG)	Romulan centurion and one of two survivors of the crash of the Pi, a small Romulan ship, on the surface of Galorndon Core. Bochra stalks and captures Geordi La Forge, who sarcastically nicknames him "Commodore." However, when the planet's electromagnetic storms wreak havoc with Bochra's metabolism and La Forge's interface with the VISOR, the men put aside their differences and work together to locate and remodulate a neutrino beacon that Wesley Crusher has sent to help locate them. They're soon rescued by the Enterprise-D and Bochra is returned to Commander Tomalak's Warbird. (Continuity Note: Bochra uses the same Romulan salute that Decius first used back in the 1966 TOS episode "Balance of Terror".)
Captain Boday	None (Only discussed, never seen.)	First Mention:The Maquis Part I (DS9) (recurring thereafter)	A Gallamite freighter captain frequently mentioned, but never seen, that Jadzia Dax was quite fond of, that Kira Nerys was repulsed by, and that Worf was somewhat jealous of. Mentioned in The Maquis, Let He Who is Without Sin..., Resurrection, Penumbra.
Brad Boimler	Jack Quaid	Second Contact (LOW) (recurring thereafter)	Human male Ensign aboard the USS Cerritos.
Bok	Frank Corsentino; Lee Arenberg	The Battle (TNG); Bloodlines (TNG)	Ferengi DaiMon who tried to wreak vengeance on Picard for the Battle of Maxia.
Boothby	Ray Walston	The First Duty (TNG), In the Flesh (VOY), The Fight (VOY)	Groundskeeper of Starfleet Academy and Starfleet Headquarters. In addition to tending grounds, Boothby offered advice and otherwise acted as a mentor to several characters–including Jean-Luc Picard, Kathryn Janeway, and Chakotay—when they were attending Starfleet Academy. Boothby several times gave Janeway a rose. Picard, in whose opinion Boothby "is one of the wisest men he has ever known", calls upon his knowledge of the Nova Squadron cadets while investigating the death of Joshua Albert in "The First Duty." Species 8472 recreates Boothby on a planet designed to mimic Starfleet HQ. 8472-Boothby mimics his signature gesture of offering a rose. Prior to his first on-screen appearance, Boothby is the subject of conversation between Captain Picard and Wesley Crusher in the TNG episodes "Final Mission" and "The Game".
Bo'rak	Bob Minor	Visionary (DS9)	Klingon officer and one of three members of a covert strike force conducting surveillance of the Romulan delegation to Starbase Deep Space Nine in 2371. Bo'rak was the drunken Klingon in this episode's teaser.
Borg	various actors and actress	Star Trek: The Next Generation (TNG); Star Trek: Voyager (VOY)	Cybernetic organisms linked in a hive mind called "the Collective". The Borg co-opt the technology and knowledge of other alien species to the Collective through the process of "assimilation": forcibly transforming individual beings into "drones" by injecting nanoprobes into their bodies and surgically augmenting them with cybernetic components. The Borg's ultimate goal is "achieving perfection". Their leader is the Borg Queen.
Dr. Philip Boyce	John Hoyt	The Cage (TC), The Menagerie (TOS)	Chief medical officer aboard the USS Enterprise in 2254, under the command of Captain Christopher Pike.
Leah Brahms	Susan Gibney	Booby Trap (TNG); Galaxy's Child (TNG)	Human female; engineer who developed the warp drive of Galaxy-class starships. During a crisis on board the Enterprise-D, chief engineer Geordi La Forge created a holodeck representation of Brahms, and later used her mission logs to create a personality for the representation. A year later, La Forge met the real Brahms, who found out about the holodeck program La Forge had created and turned hostile. Later, after working with La Forge, she made peace with his indiscretion and they became friends. In the alternate future timeline of "All Good Things...", La Forge is married to someone named "Leah", who may be Brahms (though this is not confirmed).
Branch	David Gautreaux	TMP	Starfleet commander of the Epsilon 9 space station, which observes the Klingons' battle with V'ger and then the cloud's direct heading for Earth. When Branch communicates some real-time tactical information to the Enterprise, V'ger reacts negatively to Epsilon 9's sensor scans and destroys the station.
Admiral Brand	Jacqueline Brookes	The First Duty (TNG)	Starfleet rear admiral and superintendent of Starfleet Academy in 2368. She presided over the inquiry into the death of Cadet Joshua Albert.
Captain Braxton	Allan G. Royal; Bruce McGill	Future's End (VOY); Relativity (VOY)	A native of the 29th century, he is the pilot of the Federation timeship Aeon in one timeline, and captain of the Federation timeship USS Relativity in another. In "Future's End" Braxton travels to the 24th century to destroy Voyager, believing it to be the cause of a temporal explosion that will wipe out most of the Solar System in his time. Voyager fights back sending both ships back into the temporal rift leaving Braxton stranded in the 1960s and Voyager in 1996. While investigating the real cause for the temporal explosion in the 29th century, Kathryn Janeway and Chakotay cross paths with an ostensibly manic Braxton whose vessel was stripped by Henry Starling starting the microcomputer revolution. They find out that it was indeed Starling who was responsible for the catastrophe and after preventing it Voyager is sent back into the 24th century by an alternative Braxton. In "Relativity" Braxton recruits Seven of Nine to stop the detonation of an explosive planted on Voyager during its travel through the Delta Quadrant in the 24th century, which is causing a time paradox.
Brull	Joey Aresco	The Vengeance Factor (TNG)	Brull was an Acamarian Gatherer who was able to arrange a conference between Sovereign Marouk and Chorgan, the Gatherer's leader, who almost got killed by Marouk's servant Yuta.
Brunt	Jeffrey Combs	Family Business (DS9) (recurring thereafter)	Ferengi liquidator, working for the Ferengi Commerce Authority. For a brief period, acting Grand Nagus. He's the one who discovers Ishka's illegal profit-earning activity, and afterwards he does everything to turn Quark's life into a living hell. At one occasion he revokes Quark's business licence for some time. Later though he helps Quark rescue Ishka from the Dominion's captivity.
Bu'kaH	Michelle C. Bonilla	Sleeping Dogs (ENT)	Klingon female; engineer on the IKS Somraw in 2151.
Michael Burnham	Sonequa Martin-Green	DSC	Human Starfleet mutineer, given temporary war-time field assignment as a science specialist on the USS Discovery. Lead character in Star Trek: Discovery.
Eric Burton	Rickey D'Shon Collins	Liaisons (TNG); Masks (TNG)	A student in Ms. Narsu's art class.

=== C ===
Character	Actor	Appearances	Description
Admiral Cartwright	Brock Peters	TVH, TUC	Starfleet admiral who presides at Starfleet Command in 2286, when the "whale probe/traveler" attacks Earth. In 2293, he conspires with Klingon general Chang and Romulan ambassador Nanclus to derail Federation-Klingon negotiations.
Cassie	Penny Johnson	Far Beyond the Stars (DS9)	A waitress, in a 1950s-era diner, who was Benny Russell's girlfriend in a vision experienced by Benjamin Sisko
Richard Castillo	Christopher McDonald	Yesterday's Enterprise (TNG)	A Starfleet lieutenant, helmsman aboard the Enterprise-C until it traveled 22 years into the future when he became the effective XO after all other bridge officers were killed, then was endorsed for command by Jean-Luc Picard subsequent to the death of Captain Rachel Garrett. Also, a love interest of an alternate timeline's Tasha Yar.
Chakotay	Robert Beltran	Caretaker (VOY) (recurring thereafter)	Starfleet commander and a former Maquis member, best known as the first officer of the starship USS Voyager in the TV series Star Trek: Voyager. (Throughout the series, the special rank insignia designed for former Maquis members indicates that Chakotay is a lieutenant commander, although he is only ever referred to as "commander.")
Chandra	Reginald Lal Singh	Court Martial (TOS)	Starfleet captain who served on Captain Kirk's court-martial board.
Lt. Chang	Robert Ito	Coming of Age (TNG)	He served as a TAC officer on Relva VII, where he oversaw prospective cadets taking the Starfleet Academy entrance exam in 2364, when Wesley Crusher, Oliana Mirren, the female Vulcan T'Shanik and the Benzite Mordock took their tests.
Chaotica	Martin Rayner	Night, Bride of Chaotica!, Shattered (VOY)	Metafiction holodeck character created by Tom Paris for his "Captain Proton" holodeck program. Dr. Chaotica is very fond of "Arachnia, Queen of the Spider People", portrayed by Captain Janeway in the episode "Bride of Chaotica!" (Season 5, episode 12).
Christine Chapel	Majel Barrett; Jess Bush	The Naked Time (TOS) (recurring thereafter), Beyond the Farthest Star (TAS) (recurring thereafter), TMP, TVH, SNW	Nurse aboard the USS Enterprise (NCC-1701), later a Doctor and Commander.
Charlene	Wendy Schaal	Real Life (VOY)	Hologram; the Doctor's wife in his holographic family program.
Chef	None (Only discussed, never seen.)	ENT	Chef aboard Jonathan Archer's Enterprise-NX01.
Admiral Chekote	Bruce Gray	The Circle (DS9), Gambit, Part I (TNG)	A Starfleet admiral conferred with (separately) by both Commander Sisko and Commander Riker.
Pavel Chekov	Walter Koenig; Anton Yelchin	TOS, TMP, WOK, SFS, TVH, TFF, TUC, GEN, ST09, STID, STB	Starfleet officer who served aboard the USS Enterprise (NCC-1701), USS Enterprise (NCC-1701-A) and USS Reliant.
Chorgan	Stephen Lee	The Vengeance Factor (TNG)	Chorgan was the leader of the Acamarian Gatherers and a member of the Lornak clan. In 2366, Chorgan and the Acamarian Sovereign Marouk successfully negotiated an accord, after Marouk's servant Yuta attempted to kill Chorgan because of ancient clan rivalries.
Ch'Pok	Ron Canada	Rules of Engagement (DS9)	Klingon advocate who argued at an extradition hearing on Deep Space Nine to have Worf sent to Qo'noS for trial after he apparently destroyed a Klingon civilian ship, killing all 441 of its passengers.
John Christopher	Roger Perry	Tomorrow Is Yesterday (TOS)	1960-era U.S. Air Force captain who was brought aboard the Enterprise after his fighter jet was unintentionally crushed by a tractor beam
Ensign Clancy	Anne Elizabeth Ramsay	The Emissary (TNG)	Female Starfleet ensign and flight controller aboard the Enterprise-D in 2365.
L. Q. "Sonny" Clemmons	Leon Rippy	The Neutral Zone (TNG)	Human male; 20th century civilian cryogenically frozen and discovered by the USS Enterprise-D. Most famous for his line: "Why don't you come back later on and you and me will find us a couple o' low mileage 'pit woofies' and help 'em build a memory."
Zefram Cochrane	Glenn Corbett; James Cromwell	Metamorphosis (TOS), FCT, Broken Bow (ENT) (recurring thereafter)	Human male; Earth's inventor of warp drive and the first human to make first contact with Vulcans.
J.M. Colt	Laurel Goodwin; Nicole Dickinson	The Cage (TC), Such Sweet Sorrow (DSC)	Yeoman aboard Captain Christopher Pike's Enterprise
The Comic (Ronald B. Moore)	Joe Piscopo	The Outrageous Okona (TNG)	Holodeck Comedian (designated program list code RW-96321) performing at the holodeck recreation of Charnock's Comedy Cabaret. The program was run by Data, who wanted to learn from "Mr. Comic" what would be funny. (The character was identified by the holodeck program list as "Ronald B. Moore," a reference to visual effects coordinator Ronald B. Moore, who was one of the people who assembled the holodeck computer graphic.)
Computer voice	Majel Barrett	Mudd's Women (TOS) (recurring thereafter), The Lorelei Signal (TAS) (recurring thereafter), 11001001 (TNG) (recurring thereafter), Emissary (DS9) (recurring thereafter), GEN, Caretaker (VOY) (recurring thereafter), FCT, INS, NEM, In a Mirror, Darkly, Part II, These are the Voyages... (ENT), ST09	Majel Barrett was the only performer to have had a role on the first six Star Trek series, usually as the voice of the various computers used throughout the series and five of the Star Trek films, from TOS Enterprise to the Enterprise-D, Defiant and Voyager, plus numerous Starship and Runabout computers, most likely giving her the most voice appearances in all of Trek.
Katrina Cornwell	Jayne Brook	DSC	Starfleet Admiral, recurring character in Star Trek: Discovery.
Kimara Cretak	Megan Cole; Adrienne Barbeau	Image in the Sand, Shadows and Symbols, Inter Arma Enim Silent Leges (DS9)	Being a Romulan Senator, she was a representative of the Romulan empire for a short time aboard Deep Space Nine. She was set up by Section 31 to be accused of treason against the empire and imprisoned.
Beverly Crusher	Gates McFadden	Encounter at Farpoint (TNG) (recurring thereafter), GEN, FCT, INS, NEM, PIC	Chief Medical Officer aboard the USS Enterprise (NCC-1701-D) and USS Enterprise (NCC-1701-E); widow of Jack R. Crusher and mother of Wesley Crusher and Jack Crusher.
Jack R. Crusher	Doug Wert	Family (TNG), Violations (TNG), Journey's End (TNG)	Deceased Starfleet officer, husband of Beverly Crusher and father of Wesley Crusher. He served aboard the USS Stargazer under Captain Picard, his friend, but died sometime during its mission. In "Family", when Dr. Crusher retrieved some of his things from storage, the label on the travel case lists him as "lieutenant commander", although the rank insignia on his old uniform indicates otherwise (lieutenant junior grade). Jack Crusher recorded a video message to his son Wesley during his infancy, to be viewed when he was older. Jack intended this to begin a series of pre-recorded video messages to Wesley, but because of his death, he only ever got to make one message.
Jack Crusher	Ed Speleers	Star Trek: Picard (season 3)	Son of son of Admirals Beverly Crusher and Jean-Luc Picard conceived in the 2380s. To save her son from Picard's enemies, Beverly severed ties with her former friends and crewmates of the USS Enterprise and decided to raise Jack by herself. In 2401, their medical charity ship (SS Eleos) is attacked several times by different factions. Beverly sends a distress call to Picard who after seeing her realizes that Jack is his son. Jack is saved by the bounty hunter Vadic who turns out to be a Changeling working for the Borg Queen to turn him into the Borg drone Võx. Jack inherited some Borg biological components in his DNA hidden in his father's cortex that made all Starfleet crew members under 25 susceptible for assimilation by the Borg Queen. Jack arrived at her location, was captured, and assimilated under her supervision. After Picard linked with his son, he was able to reach Jack inside of Võx and Jack rejected his Borg identity. Crusher is later placed in an accelerated program and within a year is commissioned with the rank of ensign, serving as the special counselor to Captain Seven of Nine on the USS Enterprise-G where he is approached by Q who reveals that the trial of Humanity has only just begun for Jack.
Wesley Crusher	Wil Wheaton	Encounter at Farpoint (TNG) (recurring thereafter), NEM, PIC, PRO	Enterprise-D civilian (crew family member), then Starfleet Academy cadet, then Starfleet lieutenant (j.g.), then resigned; son of Jack R. Crusher and Enterprise-D's chief medical officer Beverly Crusher; half-brother of Jack Crusher. Crusher became a Traveler, beings able to travel transdimensionally and through time at will. He helped to manage the Supervisors, field agents of the Travelers dispatched to protect the integrity of the timeline, and founded the Watchers, supervisors specifically charged with ensuring the survival of individual beings and species.
Crystalline Entity	None	Datalore (TNG), Silicon Avatar (TNG)	Life form that destroyed colonies on Omicron Theta and other planets. Conspired with Lore in attempt to destroy life on the Enterprise-D. Destroyed by the mother of one of its victims.
Jal Culluh	Anthony De Longis	Basics Part II (VOY), State of Flux (VOY)	First Maje, or leader, of the Kazon-Nistrim, one of the various warring sects of the Kazon race who inhabit the farthest region of the Delta Quadrant on the other side of the Milky Way Galaxy.

=== D ===
Character	Actor	Appearances	Description
Jenna D'Sora	Michele Scarabelli	In Theory (TNG)	Starfleet lieutenant (j.g.) and Enterprise-D security officer who fell in love with Data.
Dahj	Isa Briones	Remembrance (PIC)	Daughter of Data, killed by Romulan assassins.
Damar	Casey Biggs	Return to Grace (DS9) (recurring thereafter)	Cardassian military officer first serving under Gul Dukat then puppet head of the Cardassian Union within the Dominion and finally rebel leader for Cardassian freedom from the Dominion.
Dammar	Kenneth Tigar	Displaced (VOY)	Chief operative of the Nyrians; translocated the Voyager crew and took command of the ship.
Damron	Jeffrey Dean Morgan	Carpenter Street (ENT)	Xindi Reptilian scientist.
Caithlin Dar	Cynthia Gouw	TFF	Romulan Ambassador to the Planet of Galactic Peace.
Dara	Michelle Forbes	Half a Life (TNG)	Daughter of Kaelon II's Dr. Timicin
Darhe'el	Harris Yulin	Duet (DS9)	Cardassian Gul and leader of the Gallitep labor camp on Bajor during the Cardassian Occupation. He was dubbed the "Butcher of Gallitep" because of all the atrocities committed there under his command. Never directly appears, only impersonated by filing clerk Aamin Marritza in his hope of being sentenced to death by a Bajoran court and executed.
Arne Darvin	Charlie Brill	The Trouble with Tribbles (TOS), Trials and Tribble-ations (DS9)	In "The Trouble with Tribbles", Darvin is a Klingon who poses as a Federation official to sabotage Federation attempts to colonize Sherman's Planet. A tribble, sensitive to Klingons, hints at his true identity, which is confirmed by Dr. Leonard McCoy. Darvin is arrested. According to dialog in "Trials and Tribble-ations", Klingon intelligence subsequently turned its back on Darvin, who spent the next 100 years posing as a human merchant going by the name "Barry Waddle". Brill reprised the role for "Trials and Tribble-ations", in which Darvin gains passage from Cardassia to Bajor aboard the USS Defiant. Darvin uses the Bajoran Orb of Time to send the ship back to the time and place depicted in "The Trouble with Tribbles". Intent on exacting revenge on James T. Kirk, he plants a bomb in a tribble; the Defiant's crew prevents Kirk's murder and captures Darvin.
Data	Brent Spiner	Encounter at Farpoint (TNG) (recurring thereafter), GEN, FCT, INS, NEM, PIC	Android – second officer of the Enterprise-D.
Dathon	Paul Winfield	Darmok (TNG)	Tamarian captain, the first of his race to successfully establish communications between his species and the Federation.
Carmen Davila	Susan Diol	Silicon Avatar (TNG)	Senior member of the Malona IV project, died when the Crystalline Entity attacked the colony.
Dax (symbiont)	None	Invasive Procedures (DS9)	Trill symbiont, over 300 years old in the 24th century and carried by the 8th (later 9th) host. Only appears through the hosts who carry it (and briefly through SFX).
Audrid Dax	Armin Shimerman	Facets (DS9)	Joined Trill; fourth host of Dax symbiont. (Never appears directly but inhabits Quark's body.)
Curzon Dax	Frank Owen Smith; René Auberjonois	Emissary (DS9), Facets (DS9)	Trill male; seventh host of Dax symbiont before Jadzia, as well as her mentor. (In addition to flashbacks, he at one point inhabits Odo's body.)
Emony Dax	Chase Masterson	Facets (DS9)	Joined Trill female; third host of Dax symbiont. (Never appears directly but inhabits Leeta's body.)
Ezri Dax	Nicole de Boer	Image in the Sand (DS9) (recurring thereafter) (season 7)	Joined Trill female; ninth host of Dax symbiont; Starfleet officer, and counselor aboard DS9. Formerly Ezri Tigan.
Jadzia Dax	Terry Farrell	Emissary (DS9) (recurring thereafter) (seasons 1–6)	Joined Trill female; eighth host of Dax symbiont; Starfleet officer, and science officer aboard DS9 from 2371 to 2374.
Joran Dax	Jeff Magnus McBride; Leigh J. McCloskey; Avery Brooks	Equilibrium (DS9), Facets (DS9), Field of Fire (DS9)	Joined Trill male; sixth host of Dax symbiont. Formerly Joran Belar, an unstable murderer. (In addition to appearing in flashbacks, he at one point inhabits the body of Commander Sisko.)
Lela Dax	Nana Visitor	Facets (DS9)	Joined Trill female; first host of Dax symbiont. (Never appears directly but inhabits the body of Major Kira.)
Tobin Dax	Colm Meaney	Facets (DS9)	Joined Trill male; second host of Dax symbiont. (Never appears directly but inhabits the body of Chief O'Brien.)
Torias Dax	Alexander Siddig	Facets (DS9)	Joined Trill male; fifth host of Dax symbiont. (Never appears directly but inhabits the body of Dr. Bashir.)
Verad Dax	John Glover	Invasive procedures (DS9)	Verad Kalon was an unjoined Trill and failed host candidate who briefly stole the Dax symbiont from Jadzia Dax in 2370.
Yedrin Dax	Gary Frank	Children of Time (DS9)	Trill; descendant of Jadzia Dax and host of the Dax symbiont in an alternate timeline.
Richard Daystrom	William Marshall	The Ultimate Computer (TOS)	Human male; creator of M-5 multitronic computer system. Also created the Enterprise's main computer. 200 years later, the Federation's research and development facility the Daystrom Institute was named after him.
Debin	Douglas Rowe	The Outrageous Okona (TNG)	Chief Representative of the Atlec legation in 2365, who was chasing after The Outrageous Okona, believing that Okona had impregnated Debin's only daughter Yanar.
Decius	Lawrence Montaigne	Balance of Terror (TOS)	A proud young Romulan officer who served aboard the Praetor's flagship Bird-of-Prey in 2266. He dispatched a coded message to the Praetor while the ship was under cloak, thereby breaking the "rule of silence." For this infraction, he was reduced two steps in rank. Later, he was ordered to place a nuclear warhead with a proximity fuse among the debris that was to be jettisoned from the ship. This maneuver succeeded in severely damaging the Enterprise. Decius was viewed by the ship's elder Centurion as having powerful friends who may not appreciate his being demoted, and which could mean danger for the ship's Commander.
Matt Decker	William Windom	Doomsday Machine (TOS)	Starfleet commodore and commanding officer of the starship USS Constellation until its crew were killed by an extraterrestrial-created "planet eater" Ultimate Weapon. Decker tried to kill the planet 'eater' by going on a suicide mission with one of the shuttles belonging to the USS Enterprise. He failed, but analysis of his attempt provided inspiration for the final solution used to defeat the machine.
Willard Decker	Stephen Collins	TMP	Captain of the USS Enterprise before joining with V'ger, son of Commodore Matt Decker. Decker's basic character outline was originally developed as part of Star Trek: Phase II before that project became The Motion Picture. Some of this character's elements are similar to those of William Riker, the second in command of the USS Enterprise-D in Star Trek: The Next Generation.
Degra	Randy Oglesby	The Xindi (ENT) (recurring thereafter)	Primate representative on the Xindi Council; scientist who supervised construction of the Xindi superweapon.
DeSalle	Michael Barrier	The Squire of Gothos (TOS), This Side of Paradise (TOS), Catspaw (TOS)	Starfleet lieutenant of French descent. DeSalle served as the Enterprise's navigator ("The Squire of Gothos"), botanist ("This Side of Paradise"), and assistant chief engineer ("Catspaw"). In "The Squire of Gothos", DeSalle is part of the landing party that encounters Trelane. In "This Side of Paradise", DeSalle discovers that the colonists on Omicron Ceti III are the only life forms to survive exposure to the planet's Berthold rays. He also performs a quantitative analysis of the crops being grown by the colonists. In "Catspaw", DeSalle commands the Enterprise while Captain Kirk, Commander Spock and Lieutenant Commander Scott are being held prisoner on the surface of Pyris VII. He directs the crew's effort to pierce an alien force field to rescue the landing party. (Conjecture: The Star Trek Concordance, by Bjo Trimble, lists his first name as "Vincent".)
Stefan DeSeve	Barry Lynch	Face of the Enemy (TNG)	Former Starfleet ensign who defected to Romulus. He returns to the Federation after becoming disillusioned with the Romulans. He also relays a message from Ambassador Spock that the Enterprise-D must rendezvous with a Corvallen freighter, which is supposed to be carrying Romulan vice proconsul M'ret and his two top aides, who are defecting to the Federation.
Dickerson	Arell Blanton	The Savage Curtain (TOS)	Security guard; led honor guard detachment to greet the Excalbian projection of President Lincoln.
Dikironium Cloud Creature	None	Obsession (TOS)	Sentient gaseous cloud creature that feeds off iron-based hemoglobin; once decimated the crew of the starship Farragut then years later is encountered by the Enterprise
The Doctor	Robert Picardo	Caretaker (VOY) (recurring thereafter), FCT, Doctor Bashir, I Presume? (DS9)	"The Doctor" was the name given by the crew of the USS Voyager to their Emergency Medical Hologram (alternatively abbreviated as "EMH" or "EMH Mark I") who also served as Chief Medical Officer of the ship in lack of a flesh-and-blood doctor. In FCT Another EHM Mark I had a brief appearance when Dr. Beverly Crusher called him in order to stall The Borg.
Klim Dokachin	Graham Jarvis	Unification (TNG)	Zakdorn; quartermaster and administrator of the Federation Surplus Depot Z15.
Guruk Dolim	Scott MacDonald	The Xindi (ENT) (recurring thereafter)	Reptilian regimental commander and representative on the Xindi Council. He hijacked the Xindi superweapon.
Jose Dominguez	None (Only mentioned, never seen.)	The Man Trap (TOS)	Starfleet officer and "space commander" of the starship base on Corinth IV. He requests information regarding the Enterprise's delay at Planet M-113; he says the starship has "supplies he urgently needs".
Donatra	Dina Meyer	NEM	Romulan commander of the IRW Valdore. She attempts to ingratiate herself to Praetor Shinzon by flirting with him, but he prefers that she demonstrate her allegiance by watching Commander Suran, whose impatience and lack of respect have given Shinzon pause. Donatra fears that a war with the Federation will mark Romulan children for generations to come. She eventually rejects Shinzon and fights with the Enterprise-E against the Reman Warbird Scimitar. Although the Valdore is severely damaged in battle, Donatra is able to offer aid to the ram-damaged Enterprise after the Scimitar is destroyed.
Admiral Dougherty	Anthony Zerbe	INS	A Starfleet admiral working with the Son'a with designs on the Briar Patch
Sarina Douglas	Faith Salie	Statistical Probabilities, Chrysalis (DS9)	Human female whose genetic engineering went wrong and caused her to be cataleptic for several years. Later cured by Dr. Julian Bashir and briefly got romantically involved with him.
Drea	Lezlie Dalton	By Any Other Name (TOS)	Female Kelvan who pilots the Enterprise through the Galactic Barrier on its way to the Andromeda Galaxy.
Duchamps	Michael Dorn	Our Man Bashir (DS9)	An assistant to Dr. Hippocrates Noah in Julian Bashir's secret agent program. Due to a transporter malfunction, Duchamp appeared as Worf.
Skrain Dukat	Marc Alaimo	Emissary (DS9) (recurring thereafter)	Cardassian Gul. Prefect of Bajor during the Cardassian Occupation; Commander of Terok Nor. Father of Tora Ziyal. Briefly a guerilla fighter against the Klingon Empire, afterwards head of the Cardassian Union under The Dominion until Ziyal's death. Later he acts as the "anti-emissary" of the pagh-wraiths.
Duras, son of Ja'rod	Patrick Massett	Sins of the Father, Reunion (TNG); The Mind's Eye (mentioned only)(TNG)	Klingon male. The House of Duras was a notably aggressive and dishonest dynasty of the Klingon Empire. His father was a traitor who betrayed the Khitomer colony to the Romulans. When Ja'rod's treason was discovered post-mortem, High Council-member Duras had the blame placed on Worf's father, Mogh. His House included his two sisters, Lursa and B'Etor, and his illegitimate son, Toral. To spare his brother Kurn and to prevent the Klingon Empire from falling into civil war, Worf accepts discommendation, but calls Duras the son of a traitor and backhands him across the face, a warning that Worf will kill Duras. After Kim'pec dies of poison, Duras tries to become Kim'pec's successor on the Klingon High Council; when Worf's mate K'Ehleyr discovers the truth about the Duras family's treason, Duras kills her. In a duel Worf kills Duras, an event the Klingon High Council approved of.
Duras, son of Toral	Daniel Riordan	Judgment (ENT), Bounty (ENT), The Expanse (ENT)	Klingon male, sent to apprehend Jonathan Archer and destroy the Enterprise.

=== E ===
Character	Actor	Appearances	Description
Amelia Earhart	Sharon Lawrence	The 37s (VOY)	Human female; abducted from Earth in 1937; found cryogenically frozen in the Delta Quadrant by the Voyager crew.
Julius Eaton	Alexander Siddig	Far Beyond the Stars (DS9)	A writer for a 1950s era science fiction magazine in a vision experienced by Benjamin Sisko
Kay Eaton	Nana Visitor	Far Beyond the Stars (DS9)	A writer (who used the pseudonym "K.C. Hunter") for a 1950s-era science fiction magazine in a vision experienced by Benjamin Sisko
Michael Eddington	Kenneth Marshall	The Search (DS9); Our Man Bashir; For The Cause (DS9); For The Uniform; Blaze of Glory	Starfleet lieutenant commander and chief of Starfleet security on Starbase Deep Space 9, beginning in late 2370. He later defected to join the Maquis. Under Eddington the Maquis not only managed to drive Cardassians away from two planets so they could become human colonies but were on the verge of declaring themselves an Indepdendant Nation before he was captured by Benjamin Sisko. In his last appearance, Eddington sacrifices himself so that last five surviving members of the Maquis can be led to safety by Benjamin Sisko (Whom Eddington tricked into helping him)
Ee'Char	Craig Wasson	Hard Time (DS9)	Male; Miles O'Brien's simulated cellmate during his time-compressed simulation of incarceration. Afterwards he returns as a hallucination to haunt O'Brien (who killed him).
Albert Einstein	Jim Norton	The Nth Degree (TNG), Descent, Part I (TNG)	Holographic reproduction for a game of poker with Commander Data.
Ekoria	Ellen Wheeler	The Quickening (DS9)	Teplan female; afflicted by the blight, the first one to believe that Julian Bashir could find a cure to her condition. She died from the blight, but her baby was born perfectly healthy.
Elaan	France Nuyen	Elaan of Troyius (TOS)	Dohlman of Elas. Her planet's Council of Nobles offered her in marriage to the ruler of Troyius, a neighboring planet in the Tellun Star System, to prevent the escalation of hostilities between the two worlds. En route to Troyius on the Enterprise, Elaan stabs Ambassador Petri of Troyius for being in her quarters without permission. Later, when Elaan sheds tears (which act as a "super love potion") because she feels that nobody likes her, Kirk wipes them away and immediately becomes biochemically attracted to her. However, he's able to shake off the effects while in combat with the Klingons. In accordance with his duty, Kirk delivers Elaan to Troyius to be married, although neither is happy at the prospect.
Tam Elbrun	Harry Groener	Tin Man (TNG)	Betazoid male; had unusually great telepathic ability skilled at making contact with non-humanoid sentient life forms.
Elnor	Evan Evagora	PIC	Romulan male; an orphan raised by warrior nuns on Vashti, Qalankhkai to Picard.
Endar	Sherman Howard	Suddenly Human (TNG)	Talarian captain of the Q'Maire whose biological son was killed by humans. In accordance with Talarian customs, he claimed the human boy Jeremiah Rossa as his own son, renaming him Jono. Years later, when Captain Jean-Luc Picard intended to return Jono to his human family, Endar was ready to go to war to retrieve his adopted son.
Enright	James Doohan (voice)	The Ultimate Computer (TOS)	Starfleet commodore on the Watchtower-class space station that serves as headquarters for the M-5 multitronic unit war games.
Eris	Molly Hagan	The Jem'Hadar (DS9)	A female Vorta pretending to be a fellow prisoner when Benjamin Sisko and Quark are taken captive by the Jem'Hadar.
Esoqq	Reiner Schöne	Allegiance (TNG)	A native of the planet Chalnoth, among those held captive (including Captain Picard) in an alien prison/laboratory
Gul Evek	Richard Poe	Journey's End, Preemptive Strike (TNG), Playing God, The Maquis, Tribunal (DS9), Caretaker (VOY)	Cardassian gul and commander of the Vetar. A confrontational opponent, appearing in three Star Trek series.

=== F ===
Character	Actor	Appearances	Description
Kivas Fajo	Saul Rubinek	The Most Toys (TNG)	Zibalian male; kidnapped Data for his collection of priceless artifacts.
Falcon	Mark Yerkes; Colm Meaney	Our Man Bashir (DS9)	Hologram; assassin in Julian Bashir's secret agent holo-program. Due to a transporter malfunction, Falcon's physical parameters were temporarily modeled on O'Brien.
Dr. Farek	Ethan Phillips	Ménage à Troi (TNG)	Ferengi male; crewmember of the Krayton, tried using a mind probe on Lwaxana Troi to learn the secret of Betazed telepathy.
John Farrell	Jim Goodwin	The Enemy Within (TOS), Mudd's Women (TOS), Miri (TOS)	Human male; he served as navigator in TOS: "The Enemy Within" and "Mudd's Women" and as the relief communications officer in TOS: "Miri".
Karen Farris	Courtney Peldon	Valiant (DS9)	Human female; Red Squad cadet appointed First Officer of the USS Valiant after the death of Captain Ramirez.
Ensign Felton	Sheila Franklin	A Matter of Time, New Ground, Hero Worship, The Masterpiece Society, Imaginary Friend (all TNG)	Human female ensign who served as the conn officer on the Enterprise-D (numerous season 5 episodes, on-screen credit for five talking episodes)
Female Changeling	Salome Jens	The Search (DS9) (recurring thereafter)	Nameless ("What use would I have for a name?", DS9 episode Behind the Lines) Changeling and Founder who helps lead the Dominion's invasion of the Alpha Quadrant while teaching the Shapeshifters' ways to Odo in an attempt to lure him back to The Great Link.
Kyril Finn	Richard Cox	The High Ground (TNG)	Terrorist leader on planet Rutia IV who kidnaps Dr. Beverly Crusher to treat his people who are suffering from side-effects of the dimensional-shift transporter they use
Marla E. Finn	Nora Leonhardt	Eye of the Beholder (TNG)	Starfleet ensign assigned to Utopia Planetia shipyards. She was killed by ex-lover Lieutenant Walter Pierce.
Finnegan	Bruce Mars	Shore Leave (TOS)	Starfleet Academy cadet, upperclassman, prankster, and merciless tormentor to a young fellow cadet named James T. Kirk
Fitzgerald	Richard Derr	The Mark of Gideon (TOS)	Starfleet admiral who refuses to give Spock permission to violate the planet Gideon's sovereignty and beam down to locate the missing and allegedly kidnapped Captain Kirk, since Spock cannot prove to him that Kirk's life is in danger.
Fitzpatrick	Ed Reimers	The Trouble with Tribbles (TOS)	Starfleet admiral who ordered Kirk to cooperate fully with Nilz Baris regarding security protection for the quadrotriticale on Deep Space Station K-7.
Flint	James Daly	Requiem for Methuselah (TOS)	Human male; a 6000-year-old immortal, encountered on the planet Holberg 917G. Flint lived as many influential persons in Earth history.
Vic Fontaine	James Darren	His Way (DS9) (recurring thereafter)	Hologram; a holodeck entertainer, used as a counselor by various crewmembers of Deep Space Nine.
Fujisaki	None (Only discussed, never seen.)	Inter Arma Enim Silent Leges (DS9)	Starfleet vice admiral and deputy chief of Starfleet Intelligence until 2374, when he died. Section 31 believed that Koval, the Romulan chairman of the Tal Shiar, was involved in his death, but there was no proof. (Never appears, only talked about.)

== See also ==
- List of Star Trek characters G–M • N–S • T–Z
- List of recurring Star Trek: Deep Space Nine characters • Enterprise • The Next Generation • The Original Series • Voyager
- List of Star Trek episodes
