= The Maquis =

- Star Trek: Deep Space Nine episodes
- Episode nos.: Season 2 Episodes 20 and 21
- Directed by: David Livingston (Part I); Corey Allen (Part II)
- Story by: Rick Berman (Parts I and II); Michael Piller (Parts I and II); Jeri Taylor (Parts I and II); James Cocker (Part I); Ira Steven Behr (Part II)
- Teleplay by: James Cocker (Part I); Ira Steven Behr (Part II)
- Production codes: 440 and 441
- Original air dates: April 25, 1994; May 2, 1994

Guest appearances
- Bernie Casey as Cal Hudson; Richard Poe as Gul Evek; Marc Alaimo as Gul Dukat; Tony Plana as Amaros; Bertila Damas as Sakonna; John Schuck as Legate Parn; Natalija Nogulich as Admiral Nechayev; Michael Bell as Xepolite; Michael A. Krawic as William Samuels; Amanda Carlin as Kobb; Michael Rose as Niles

Episode chronology
← Previous "Blood Oath"	Next → "The Wire"
- Star Trek: Deep Space Nine season 2

"The Maquis" is a two-part episode from the second season of the television series Star Trek: Deep Space Nine.

Set in the 24th century, the series follows the adventures on Deep Space Nine, a space station located near a stable wormhole between the Alpha and Gamma quadrants of the Milky Way Galaxy, in orbit of the planet Bajor. The episode focuses on maintaining a difficult peace between the Bajorans, the Cardassians and the Federation by trying to resolve a conflict that could lead to war.

The two-part episode, which first aired in April and May 1994, introduced the Maquis, a resistance group that would reappear in further episodes of Deep Space Nine and in Star Trek: The Next Generation and Star Trek: Voyager.

Part I was written by James Crocker, Rick Berman, Michael Piller and Jeri Taylor, with the teleplay written by James Crocker, and directed by David Livingston. Part II was written by Rick Berman, Michael Piller, Jeri Taylor and Ira Steven Behr, with the teleplay written by Ira Steven Behr, and directed by Corey Allen.

== Plot ==
=== Part I ===
As a Cardassian transport, the Bok'nor, prepares to depart from Deep Space Nine, a man in a Starfleet uniform surreptitiously adjusts some nearby equipment. Shortly after departing, the vessel explodes, killing everyone on board.

While the crew begins an investigation, Starfleet sends Lieutenant Commander Calvin Hudson, the Federation attaché to the new demilitarized zone along the Cardassian border, to advise and assist. Hudson, an old friend of Commander Sisko and Dax, confides in Sisko his dissatisfaction with his assignment; he believes Starfleet abandoned the colonists, and that their trust in the Cardassians to honor the treaty is naive.

When Sisko returns to his quarters that evening, he finds Gul Dukat waiting for him. Dukat explains that he is there "unofficially", without the knowledge of Cardassian Central Command, to help Sisko find the truth. On Dukat's request, the two take a runabout to the demilitarized zone, where they detect two Cardassian vessels attacking a Federation merchant ship. The attackers ignore Dukat's orders to stand down, but before the runabout can intervene, an unidentified Federation vessel appears and destroys the Cardassians.

Meanwhile, a Vulcan associate of the saboteur, Sakonna, approaches Quark to negotiate a business arrangement, which he is surprised to learn is an attempt to acquire a wide array of weapons. Elsewhere on the station, the saboteur is abducted by unknown assailants.

Sisko and Dukat arrive at a colony in the demilitarized zone to find Hudson and several colonists in a heated debate with Gul Evek, Hudson's Cardassian counterpart. Evek produces a recorded confession from the Bok'Nor saboteur, identified as William Patrick Samuels, then brings in Samuels' corpse, claiming he committed suicide, sparking outrage from the colonists. Hudson later privately concedes that Samuels may have been guilty of the sabotage, but claims that the colonists have a right to defend themselves, and warns Sisko about the Cardassians again. On the way back to DS9, Dukat vehemently denies Hudson's assertion that the Bok'Nor was transporting weapons.

Chief O'Brien confirms that the device that destroyed the Bok'Nor was of Federation origin. Sisko has Dukat's quarters secured as a precaution, but Sakonna and several colonists manage to kidnap him. A group in the demilitarized zone calling itself "The Maquis" claims responsibility. Sisko, Major Kira and Dr. Bashir track the kidnappers to a planet in an area known as the Badlands, where they are captured by armed Maquis members, with Hudson revealing himself as their leader.

=== Part II ===
Sisko demands to see Dukat. Hudson accuses Sisko of siding with the Cardassians over him. Hudson claims the Maquis want only peace, while Sisko characterizes their desire to retaliate simply as revenge. After Sisko declines an offer to join, Hudson and the Maquis stun the group and depart.

Admiral Nechayev is waiting for Sisko when he returns to Deep Space Nine. She refers to the Maquis as "a bunch of irresponsible hotheads" and instructs Sisko to reason with them, seemingly unaware of the true nature of the situation. Legate Parn of the Cardassian Central Command then arrives, and as Sisko prepares to meet him, Odo reports that he has caught "one of the Vulcan's accomplices". Sisko arrives to find Quark in a holding cell.

Quark eventually reveals that he arranged for Sakonna to acquire weapons, unaware of the Maquis at the time, and believes Sakonna is planning an attack within the next few days. Parn then admits that weapons have been smuggled into the demilitarized zone, informing Sisko and Kira that the Cardassian Central Command blames Dukat, claiming he is acting as a renegade, though Sisko and Kira consider it clear they are merely setting him up as a scapegoat.

At a Maquis base, Sakonna attempts to establish a Vulcan mind meld with Dukat, which he easily resists. Sisko, Bashir and Odo arrive and interrupt the interrogation, and try to resolve the situation peacefully, but Dukat grows impatient, triggering a firefight. The Maquis are captured, but Sisko lets one of their leaders go to deliver a message to Hudson imploring him to settle things peacefully. They bring Dukat back to Deep Space Nine, where they inform him of Parn's accusations. With Dukat's help, they catch a Xepolite trader transporting weapons on behalf of the Central Command.

Quark talks Sakonna into revealing to Sisko that the Maquis are planning to blow up a Cardassian weapons depot in the next 52 hours, but she does not know where it is. Dukat promises to find out the depot's location, and in the meantime, Sisko visits Hudson one final time, imploring him to reconsider abandoning his career. Hudson resolutely declines, vaporizing his Starfleet uniform with a phaser.

The DS9 crew is waiting in runabouts when the Maquis arrive at the depot, and as neither Hudson nor Sisko wants to hurt the other, they attempt to disable one another. Finally, only Sisko's runabout and Hudson's raider remain, with Sisko's engines and Hudson's weapons inoperable. Over Dukat's objections, Sisko allows Hudson to escape. Ultimately, Sisko wonders if he has prevented a war or merely delayed the inevitable.

== Production and impact ==
The episodes follow plot elements introduced in the Star Trek: The Next Generation episode "Journey's End", broadcast one month earlier on March 28, 1994, while the two series were running concurrently. In "Journey's End", it was established that the Federation settlers would not be required to leave their colonies that had been annexed into Cardassian territory in the newly created demilitarized zone, despite the potential mistreatment under Cardassian occupation.

The introduction of the Maquis came from a desire by the writers to introduce people that were different from Starfleet, while also creating an opportunity to do cross-overs and enhance franchise continuity. A director of the episode was happy with enhancements to continuity, such as actors reprising their roles as characters with whom the audience was already familiar. The Maquis, and their dissatisfaction with the Federation, would recur in future Deep Space Nine episodes such as "For the Cause", "For the Uniform", and "Blaze of Glory", as well as one appearance in The Next Generation episode "Preemptive Strike".

The Maquis faction became a key component in the launch of the upcoming series Star Trek: Voyager, which used the Federation response to the group in its initial episodes leading to the Voyager and a Maquis' ship getting stranded in the Delta Quadrant. The two crews then had to work together to return to the Alpha Quadrant.

This episode contains numerous special effect sequences including various space battles. It also shows a Cardassian spacecraft, the Bok'Nor, docked at Deep Space Nine, and another unnamed Federation spacecraft.

The episode was directed by David Livingston. Livingston directed many Star Trek episodes in this era, including for Star Trek: The Next Generation (1987-1994), Star Trek: Deep Space Nine (1993-1999), Star Trek: Voyager and Enterprise. Overall, he directed 62 episodes of Star Trek, including 17 for Star Trek: Deep Space Nine.

== Reception ==
Zack Handlen of The A.V. Club wrote: "as is so often the case with two part episodes, it’s hard to judge exactly how well this one works on its own" and while he enjoyed the adventures of Sisko and Dukat he felt there was no real tension in the cliffhanger ending. In his review of the second part, Handlen wrote: "As two-parters go, this serves its purpose, and the second half has some excellent moments. It’s just, without any real consequence" and that the story spends "too much time telling us to care instead of forcing us to" concluding that it was a missed opportunity.

In 2015, Geek.com recommended "The Maquis, Part I" and "The Maquis, Part II" as "essential watching" for their abbreviated Star Trek: Deep Space Nine binge-watching guide. In 2016, USA Today included this episode as must-watch for the entire Star Trek franchise for its introduction of the Maquis story, which would also be an element in Star Trek: Voyager. They note the interesting science fiction story elements of the Federation, Cardassians, Maquis and Bajorans playing off one another to create complex themes centered around Deep Space Nine.

In 2020, Den of Geek listed "The Maquis" as one of the best stories of Star Trek: Deep Space Nine. James Whitbrook of Io9 said this was one of the "must watch" episodes from the series.

== Releases ==
The two part episode was released in two separate LaserDisc releases. A double episode 12 inch optical disc with "Blood Lines" and "The Maquis, Part I" was released on October 6, 1998 in the United States. Another item with "The Maquis, Part II" and "The Wire" was released on October 20, 1998.

On April 1, 2003, Season 2 of Star Trek: Deep Space Nine was released on DVD video discs, with 26 episodes on seven discs.

This episode was released again in 2017 on DVD with the complete series box set, which had 176 episodes on 48 discs.
