= Children of Time =

Children of Time may refer to:

- Children of Time (novel), a 2015 novel by Adrian Tchaikovsky
- "Children of Time" (Star Trek: Deep Space Nine), an episode of the television series
