= Tilt (1979 film) =

1979 film by Rudy Durand

- Theatrical release poster
- Directed by: Rudy Durand
- Written by: Donald Cammell; Rudy Durand
- Produced by: Rudy Durand
- Starring: Brooke Shields; Ken Marshall; Charles Durning; Lorenzo Lamas
- Cinematography: Richard H. Kline
- Edited by: Don Guidice
- Music by: Lee Holdridge
- Distributed by: Warner Bros. Pictures
- Release date: April 1979
- Running time: 111 minutes
- Country: United States
- Language: English
- Budget: $3.5 million

Tilt is a 1979 American comedy-drama film about pinball hustling, starring Charles Durning and Brooke Shields as the young titular lead. It was directed by Rudy Durand.

== Plot ==
The film opens in Texas, where Neil Gallagher (Ken Marshall) challenges obese pinball champion Harold Remmens (Durning), appropriately nicknamed "The Whale," to a $400 match. When Neil gets caught cheating, he heads off to California, where he meets teen runaway Brenda "Tilt" Davenport (Shields), a 14-year-old pinball wizard. Neil watches as Tilt and the owner of Mickey's Bar hustle an unaware gambler in a game of pinball, and immediately decides to team up with her. He tells her that he is a hopeful country and western star and needs to raise money to make a demo tape of his songs. After hearing Neil's musical talent, she's impressed and agrees to help by traveling with him, raising cash with her pinball skills. When the two eventually end up back in his hometown, Neil sets up a $3,500 game between Tilt and the Whale. However, he doesn't realize that Tilt has caught on to his lies and manipulation, and his big plans may not go as he hoped.

== Cast ==
Actor	Role
Brooke Shields	"Tilt" (Brenda Louise Davenport)
Charles Durning	Harold "The Whale" Remmens
Ken Marshall	Neil Gallagher
Lorenzo Lamas	Casey Silverwater
Don Stark	Gary Laswitz
John Crawford	Mickey
Karen Lamm	Hype
Robert Brian Berger	Replay
Harvey Lewis	Henry Bertolino
Geoffrey Lewis	Truck Driver

== Reception ==
Roger Sharpe heavily criticized the film due to it combining pinball and gambling less than 3 years after the New York court hearing where he proved pinball was a game of skill. He said "everyone has to divest themselves of any connection with the film and with the image it represents for the games", with concern of how it might affect repeal of any remaining legislation restricting pinball.

== See also ==
- Tommy - 1975 film with a similar plot
- The Wizard - 1989 film with a similar plot
