= Maquis (Star Trek) =

Fictional terrorist organisation

In the Star Trek science-fiction franchise, the Maquis /mɑːˈkiː/ are a 24th-century paramilitary organization and terrorist group. Their name alludes to the World War II Maquis in the French Resistance and the Spanish Maquis who emerged in the Spanish Civil War. The group first appeared in "The Maquis", a two-part episode of the television series Star Trek: Deep Space Nine that aired in 1994. The episode built on a plot introduced in "Journey's End", an episode of Star Trek: The Next Generation. The group appears in later episodes of those series as well as in Star Trek: Voyager, whose premise is that a Starfleet crew and a Maquis crew are stranded together on the far side of the Galaxy.

The Maquis are also in the comic book saga The Maquis: Soldier of Peace by Malibu Comics, which held the rights to Deep Space Nine comics in the 1990s, and in the book series The Badlands by Susan Wright.

== Concept ==
The concept of the Maquis was introduced by the creators of The Next Generation so that it could play a role in the upcoming Voyager, which was to begin airing in 1995. As Jeri Taylor commented, "We knew that we wanted to include a renegade element in Voyager, and that the show would involve a ship housing both Starfleet people and those idealistic freedom fighters that the Federation felt were outlaws [i.e., the Maquis]." The creators of Star Trek created a backstory for the Maquis in several episodes of Deep Space Nine and The Next Generation, naming them after the French guerrilla fighters of the Second World War. The recurring characters of Michael Eddington (Kenneth Marshall) in Deep Space Nine and Ro Laren (Michelle Forbes) in The Next Generation became members of the Maquis, and Voyager contained Maquis characters such as Chakotay (Robert Beltran), B'Elanna Torres (Roxann Dawson) and Seska (Martha Hackett). While the book by Erdmann links the Maquis to the French Maquis, their history appears more closely to the Spanish Maquis.

In "Caretaker", the pilot episode of Star Trek: Voyager, the titular starship pursues a Maquis ship into the Badlands before being teleported to the Delta Quadrant.

== Storyline ==
According to the storyline of the fictional Star Trek universe, the Maquis were formed in the 24th century after a peace treaty was enacted between the United Federation of Planets and the Cardassian Union, redesignating the demilitarized zone between the two powers, which resulted in the Federation ceding several of their colony worlds to the Cardassians. Although the colonists were offered free relocation to elsewhere in Federation territory, some insisted on remaining on the ceded worlds; effectively becoming subject to the Cardassian Union, which behaves aggressively towards them. Some of these colonists subsequently formed the Maquis to protect themselves from Cardassian aggression, due to a lack of official support from the Federation; who feared breaking the peace treaty with the Cardassians, which would lead to war.

Nonetheless, various Federation members supported the Maquis' cause, and illegally supplied them with weapons and other technology that they could use in their struggle. In several cases, the Federation intervened in the conflict, helping the Cardassians in recognition of the peace treaty. In one case, the Federation ship USS Voyager tracked a Maquis vessel to the Badlands to apprehend it, but an alien force transported both to the Delta Quadrant on the opposite side of the Milky Way Galaxy. The two crews were forced to unite to survive against alien threats such as the Kazon and the Borg. In later years, when the Cardassians joined the Dominion to fight in the Dominion War against the Federation, the Dominion helped the Cardassian military to wipe out the Maquis in a prelude to their war against the Federation and its allies.

The Maquis provide moral challenges to characters such as Quark and Sisko on Deep Space Nine. Quark is lured into selling weapons to the Maquis by an attractive Vulcan woman, showing how his desire for money unwittingly turned him into an illegal-arms dealer. Sisko must navigate the internal politics of the Cardassians and Federation as he tries to uphold the peace treaty, in addition to being tested by his old friend trying to recruit him into the rebellion.

== Episodes ==
Cardassians were introduced on Star Trek The Next Generation in January 1991 with the episode "The Wounded", which lays some of the foundation for the Federation settlements on the Cardassian border. "Ensign Ro" aired in October 1991 introducing the experiences of living in Cardassian-occupied space. Star Trek: Deep Space Nine premiered in January 1993 and is primarily set within former Cardassian-occupied space. The Next Generation's "Journey's End" aired in March 1994 and introduced the results of the Federation-Cardassian peace treaty and establishment of a new demilitarized zone with Federation colonists in Cardassian territory. The Maquis were then formally introduced one month later on Deep Space Nine's two-part episode "The Maquis" and would then be the focus of many episodes of the franchise.

The episode "Learning Curve" used the different operating styles of Maquis and Federation as a plot point when some Maquis were taken aboard as crew on a Federation starship.

=== Maquis-focused episodes ===
- "Journey's End" (TNG, Airdate - March 28, 1994) Federation-Cardassian new border treaty signed, leading to resistance
- "The Maquis, Part I and Part II" (DS9, Airdate - April 24, 1994, and May 1, 1994) First appearance of the Maquis
- "Preemptive Strike" (TNG, Airdate - May 16, 1994)
- "Tribunal" (DS9, Airdate - June 5, 1994)
- "Defiant" (DS9, Airdate - November 21, 1994)
- "Caretaker" (VOY, Airdate - January 16, 1995)
- "Learning Curve" (VOY, Airdate - May 22, 1995)
- "Dreadnought" (VOY, Airdate - February 12, 1996)
- "For the Cause" (DS9, Airdate - May 6, 1996)
- "For the Uniform" (DS9, Airdate - February 3, 1997)
- "Blaze of Glory" (DS9, Airdate - May 12, 1997) The final Maquis conflict in the Alpha Quadrant.
- "Worst Case Scenario" (VOY, Airdate - May 14, 1997)
- "Hunters" (VOY, Airdate - February 11, 1998) Voyager learns of the fate of the Maquis
- "Repression" (VOY, Airdate - October 25, 2000)

== Characters ==
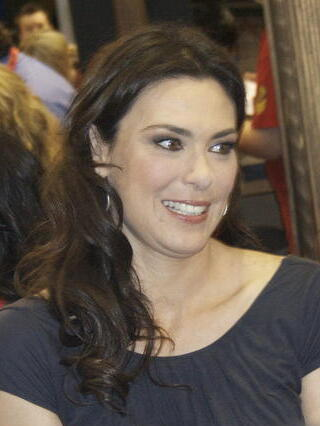
Actress Michelle Forbes played the troubled Starfleet officer Ro Laren.

Various members of the Maquis are characters in TNG, DS9, and Voyager, although membership is sometimes transitory and as revealed by the Maquis saga, for example some are revealed as Federation agents. The reveal of a character's identity is common plot device throughout the story line. Many episodes play on these questions.

- B'Elanna Torres (played by Roxann Dawson)
- Chakotay, captain of a Maquis space vessel. (played by Robert Beltran)
- Calvin Hudson, Maquis leader (played by Bernie Casey)
- Macias, Maquis leader (played by John Franklyn-Robbins)
- Michael Eddington (played by Kenneth Marshall)
- Ro Laren (played primarily by Michelle Forbes)
- Teero (played by Keith Szarabajka)
- Tuvok, Federation agent and Voyager bridge officer (played by Tim Russ)
- Thomas Riker (played by Jonathan Frakes)
- Sakonna (played by Bertila Damas)
- Santos (played by William Thomas Jr.)
- Seska (played by Martha Hackett)

== Fictional spacecraft ==
In the Star Trek science fiction franchise, the Maquis are known to use a diverse mix of older spacecraft from the United Federation of Planets. Three aspects are that the spacecraft are older, as much as several decades, there are a variety of types in service, and finally, they tend to be of Federation design. Although the spacecraft are old, the Maquis are known to upgrade them with advanced weaponry to take on larger Cardassian vessels such as the Galor class.

- The Val Jean in "Caretaker"
- Maquis raider as seen on Star Trek: Deep Space Nine episode "The Maquis, Part II" The Maquis spaceship in this episode was designed by Rich Sternbach, and constructed of fiberglass and resin.
- Dreadnought, former Cardassian weapon commandeered by the Maquis ("Dreadnought")
- Maquis Interceptor/Maquified Peregrine-class

The Maquis Fighter seen in the DS9 episodes ("The Maquis" I & II) was designed by Jim Martin and the model for the special effect shots was built by Tony Meinenger. The fighter/transport used by Ro was also designed by Jim Martin, but that model was built by Greg Jein.

In 2006, the miniature model of the Maquis raider from "The Maquis, Part II" went for 10,800 USD at auction.

== Reception ==
An example of a review of Maquis episode was in 2016; USA Today the episode "The Maquis" as a must-watch for the entire Star Trek franchise for its introduction of the Maquis story, which would also be an element in Star Trek: Voyager. They note the interesting science fiction story elements of the Federation, Cardassians, Maquis, and Bajorans playing off one another to create complex themes centered around the fictional space station Deep Space Nine.

== Broadcast and releases ==
Episodes featuring the Maquis were distributed in many ways because the story was spread out across multiple series. For instance, Star Trek : Deep Space Nine was broadcast in syndication, while Star Trek: Voyager was on the UPN network. Home Video Releases of the television episodes include an array of LaserDisc, VHS, and DVD titles. Relevant Star Trek: Trek The Next Generation titles were also released on Blu-Ray disc in HD.

For example, the two part episode "The Maquis" was released in two separate LaserDisc releases in the United States. A double episode 12 inch optical disc with "Blood Oath" and "The Maquis, Part I" was released on October 6, 1998, in the United States. Another item with "The Maquis, Part II" and "The Wire" was released on October 20, 1998.
