= Niccolò and Maffeo Polo =

Medieval Italian traveling merchant brothers

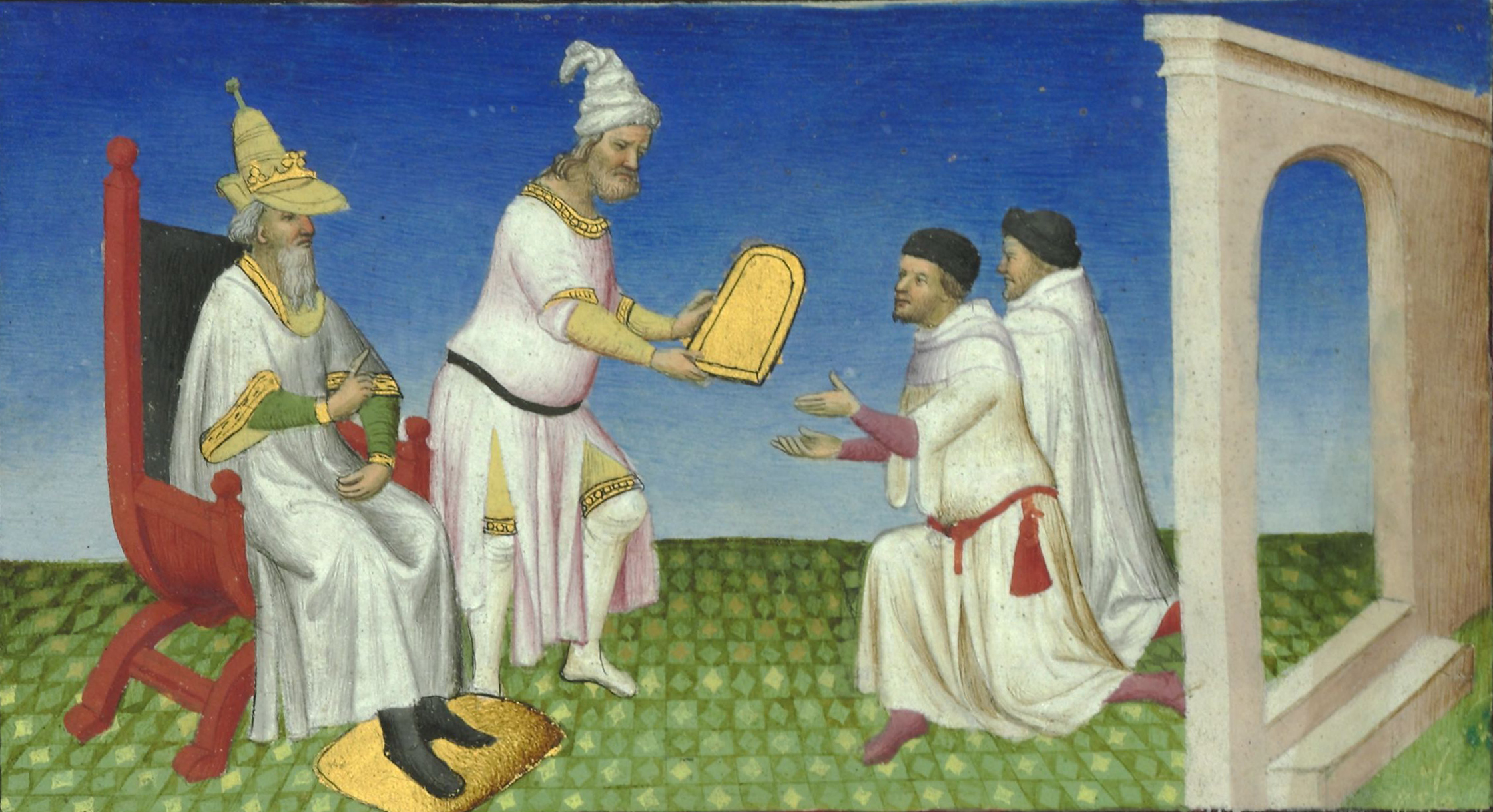
Polo brothers receiving a gold laissez-passer from Kublai Khan, as illustrated in the 1410–1412 illuminated manuscript Livre des merveilles (BnF Fr2810).

Niccolò Polo (Italian: [nikkoˌlɔ pˈpɔːlo], Venetian: [nikoˌɰɔ ˈpolo]; c. 1230 – c. 1294) (Note: Died before 1300.) and Maffeo (Note: Also Matteo (Italian: [matˈtɛːo], Venetian: [maˈtɛo]).) Polo (Italian: [mafˈfɛːo ˈpɔːlo], Venetian: [maˈfɛo ˈpolo]; c. 1230 – c. 1309) (Note: Died before 1318.) were Italian (Note: Though an Italian nation state had yet to be established, the Latin equivalent of the term Italian (italus) had been in use for natives of the region since antiquity.) travelling merchants from the Republic of Venice, best known as the father and uncle, respectively, of the explorer Marco Polo. The brothers went into business before Marco's birth, established trading posts in Constantinople, Sudak in Crimea, and in a western part of the Mongol Empire in Asia. As a duo, they reached modern-day China before temporarily returning to Europe to deliver a message to the Pope. Taking Niccolò's son Marco with them, the Polos then made another journey through Asia, which became the subject of Marco's account The Travels of Marco Polo.

== First voyage ==
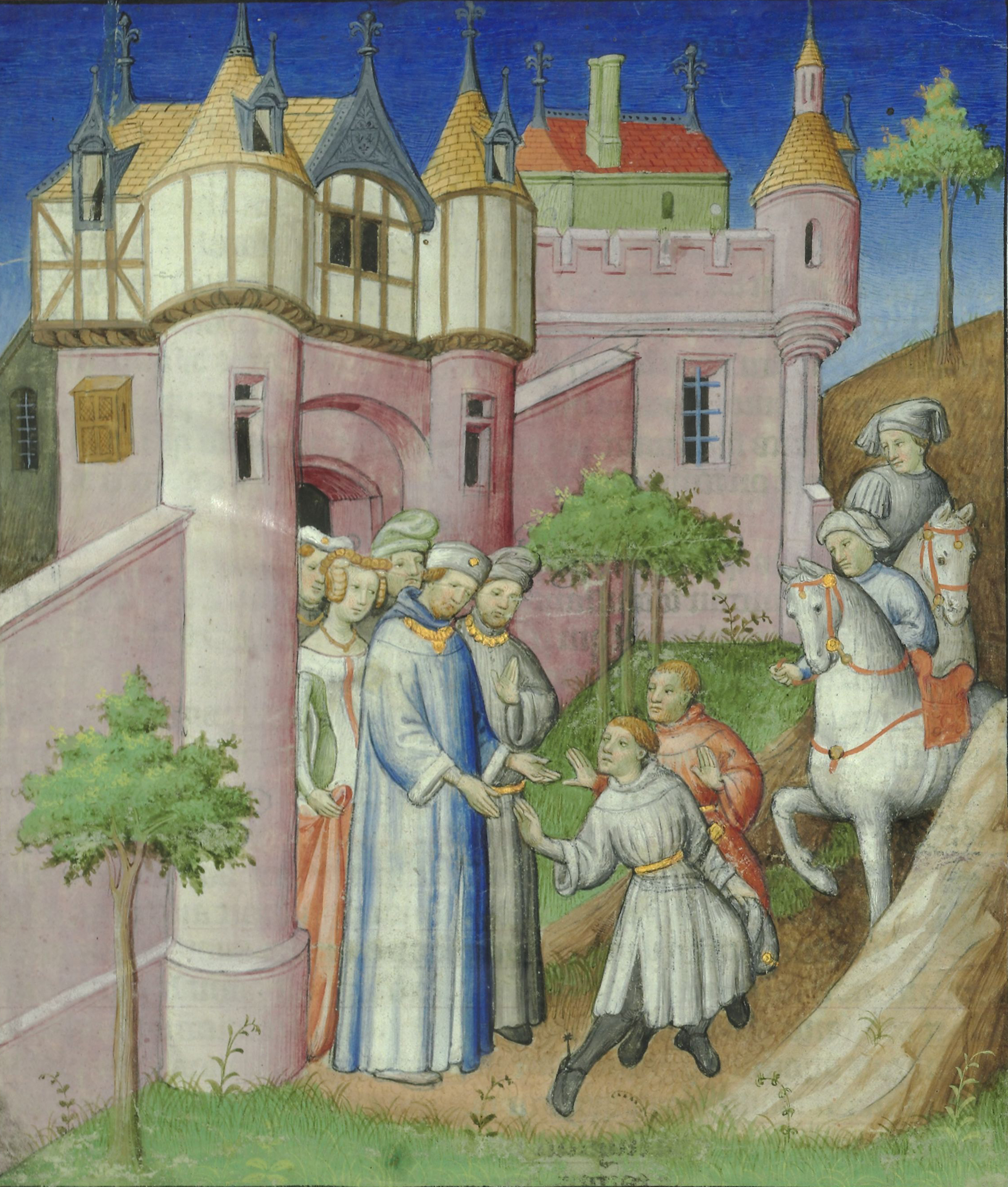
Niccolò and Maffeo Polo leaving Constantinople for the east, in 1259.

Leaving Niccolò's infant son Marco behind, Niccolò and Maffeo left Venice for Constantinople, where they resided for several years. (Note: The exact date of their departure remains unknown.) The two brothers lived in the Venetian quarter of Constantinople, where they enjoyed diplomatic immunity, political chances and tax relief because of their country's role in establishing the Latin Empire in the Fourth Crusade of 1204. However, the family judged the political situation of the city precarious, so they decided to transfer their business northeast to Soldaia, a city in Crimea, and left Constantinople in 1259 or 1260. Their decision proved wise. Constantinople was recaptured in 1261 by Michael Palaeologus, the ruler of the Empire of Nicaea, who promptly burned and razed the Venetian quarter and reestablished the Byzantine Empire. Captured Venetian citizens were blinded, while many of those who managed to escape died aboard overloaded refugee ships fleeing to other Venetian colonies in the Aegean Sea.

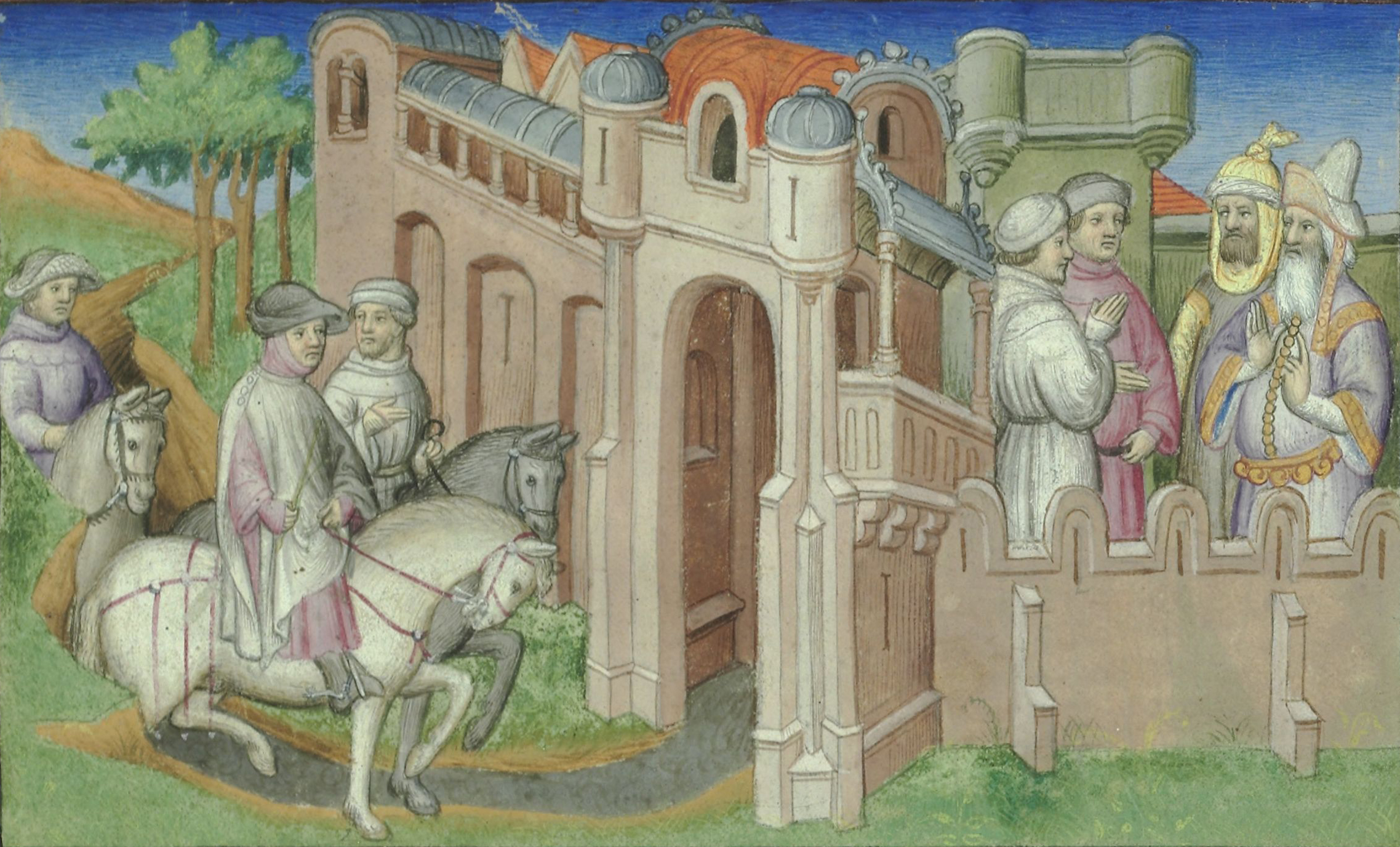
Niccolò and Maffeo in Bukhara, where they stayed for three years. They were invited by an envoy of Hulagu (right) to travel east to visit Kublai Khan.

Their new home on the north rim of the Black Sea, Soldaia (present-day Sudak, Crimea) had been frequented by Venetian traders since the 12th century. When the Polos reached it, it was part of the newly formed Mongol state known as the Golden Horde. Knowing that they could not return west to Constantinople, they planned to venture east and return at a later date. The Polos continued their journey to Sarai, where the court of Berke Khan, the ruler of the Golden Horde, was located. At that time, the city of Sarai was no more than a huge encampment, and the Polos stayed for about a year. The Polo brothers became merchant partners, ortoq, of Berke to sell wares entrusted to them.

Finally, they decided to avoid Crimea, because of a civil war between Berke and his cousin Hulagu or perhaps because of the bad relationship between Berke Khan and the Byzantine Empire. Later, they moved east and crossed the Tigris River, and walked 17 days through the northern end of the Arabian desert where they did not encounter any towns or villages save for a few Tatar nomads with tents and livestock. Eventually, when they reached Bukhara, the brothers realised they could not continue their journey nor return the way they had come from, so they decided to stay here for three years.

While still in Bukhara, Niccolò and Maffeo met a travelling messenger of the Ilkhanate ruler Hulagu. The messenger was on his way to meet Kublai Khan and decided to invite the brothers on his journey. In 1266, they reached the seat of Kublai Khan, the leader of the Mongol Yuan dynasty, at Dadu (present-day Beijing). In the book, The Travels of Marco Polo, Kublai Khan officially received the Polos and sent them back with a Mongol named Koeketei as an ambassador to the pope. They brought with them a letter from the Khan requesting 100 educated people to come and teach Christianity and Western customs to his people and oil from the lamp of the Holy Sepulchre. The letter also contained a paiza, a golden tablet a foot long and 3 inches (7.6 cm) wide, allowing the holder to acquire and obtain lodging, horses and food throughout Kublai Khan's dominion. Koeketei left in the middle of the journey, leaving the Polos to travel alone to Ayas in the Armenian Kingdom of Cilicia. From that port city, they sailed to Acre, capital of the Kingdom of Jerusalem.

The long sede vacante between the death of Pope Clement IV, in 1268, and the election of the new pope in 1271 delayed the Polos' attempts to fulfil Kublai's request. As suggested by Teobaldo Visconti, then papal legate for the realm of Egypt, in Acre for the Ninth Crusade, the two brothers returned to Venice in 1269 or 1270, waiting for the nomination of the new pope. Here Niccolò met up once again with his son Marco, now 15 or 16, who had been living with his aunt and another uncle in Venice since the death of his mother at a young age.

== Second voyage ==
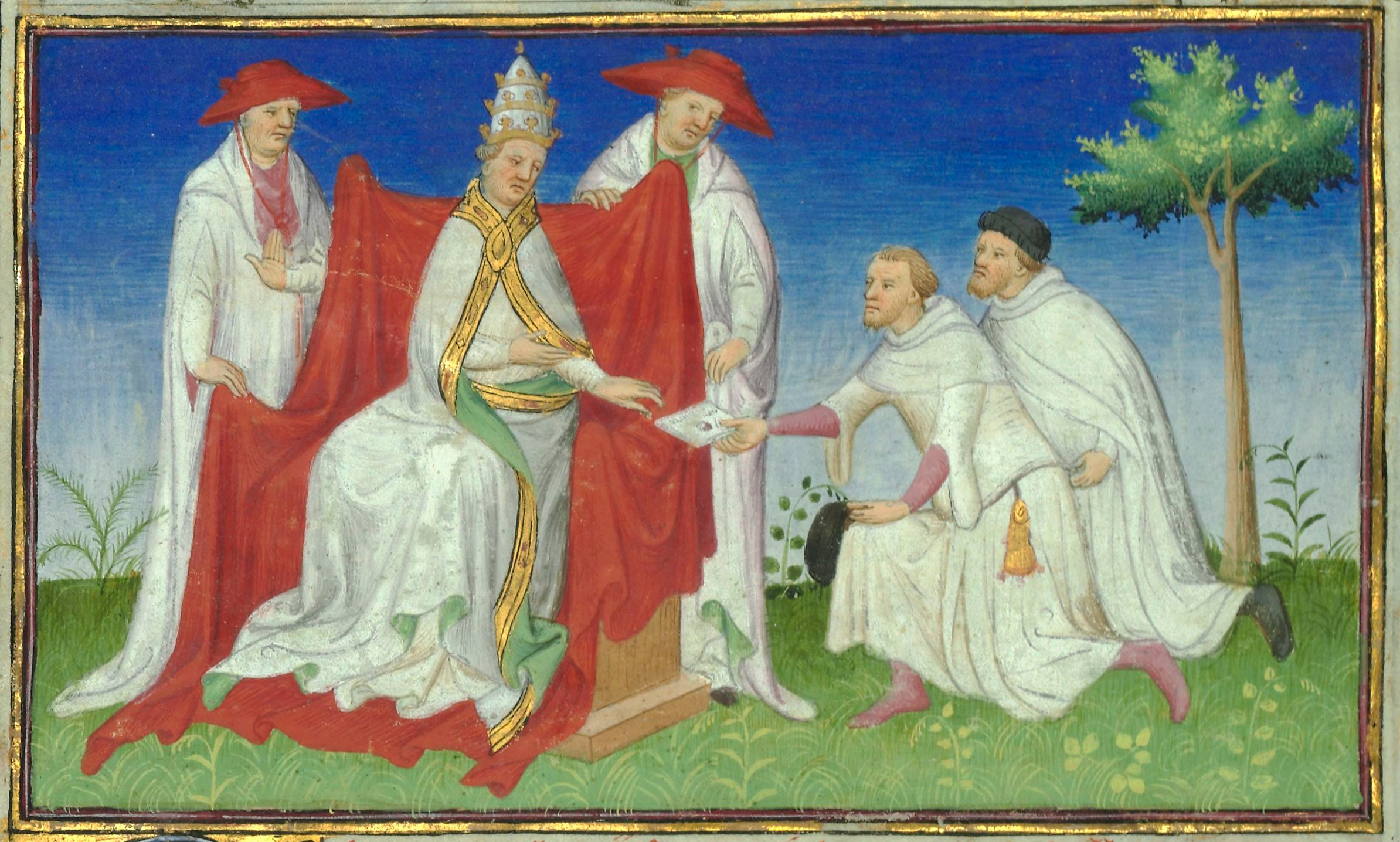
Niccolò and Maffeo Polo remitting a letter from Kublai Khan to Pope Gregory X in 1271.

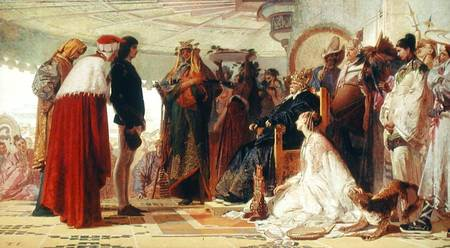
Niccolò, Maffeo and Marco Polo at the court of Kublai Khan, painting by Tranquillo Cremona, 1863

As soon as he was elected in 1271, Pope Gregory X (the former Teobaldo Visconti) received the letter from Kublai Khan, remitted by Niccolò and Maffeo. Kublai Khan was asking for the dispatch of a hundred missionaries, and some oil from the lamp of Jerusalem. The two Polos (this time accompanied by the 17-year-old Marco Polo) returned to Mongolia, accompanied by two Dominican friars, Niccolò de Vicence and Guillaume de Tripoli. The two friars did not finish the voyage due to fear, but the Polos reached Kanbaliq and remitted the presents from the Pope to Kublai in 1274. It is usually said that the Polos used the Northern Silk Road, although the possibility of a southern route has been advanced. The Polos spent the next 17 years in China. According to The Travels of Marco Polo (Il Milione), Kublai Khan took a liking to Marco, who was an engaging storyteller. He was sent on many diplomatic missions throughout his empire. Marco carried out diplomatic assignments but also entertained the Khan with interesting stories and observations about the lands he travelled. According to Marco's travel account, the Polos asked several times for permission to return to Europe, but the Great Khan appreciated the visitors so much that he would not agree to their departure.

Only in 1291 did Kublai entrust Marco with his last duty, to escort the Mongol princess Kököchin (Cocacin in Il Milione) to her betrothed, the Ilkhan Arghun. The party travelled by sea, departing from the southern port city of Quanzhou and sailing to Sumatra, and then to Persia via Sri Lanka and India. In 1293 or 1294, the Polos reached the Ilkhanate, ruled by Gaykhatu after the death of Arghun, and left Kököchin with the new Ilkhan. Then they moved to Trebizond and from that city sailed to Venice.

== Popular culture ==
- Niccolò and Maffeo Polo are featured in the 2011 video game Assassin's Creed Revelations. They are inducted into the Assassin Order by Altaïr Ibn-La'Ahad, who bequeathed them his Codex and five Memory Seals (which can be collected in several secret locations), before the brothers established various Assassins Guilds. Niccolò's journal titled The Secret Crusade is also featured in the game.
- The brothers are also featured in Netflix's historical fiction series, Marco Polo which premiered in 2014.
- Niccolò and Maffeo are characters in the 1982 miniseries Marco Polo, played by Denholm Elliott and Tony Vogel, respectively.
- They are portrayed by Massimo Girotti and Mića Orlović in the 1965 movie Marco the Magnificent.
