= Marco Polo (1982 TV series) =

American-Italian television miniseries

- Poster of Marco Polo
- Genre: Historical drama
- Written by: David Butler; Vincenzo Labella; Giuliano Montaldo
- Directed by: Giuliano Montaldo
- Starring: Kenneth Marshall; Denholm Elliott; Tony Vogel; F. Murray Abraham; Anne Bancroft; John Gielgud; John Houseman; Burt Lancaster; Tony Lo Bianco; Ian McShane; Leonard Nimoy; David Warner; James Hong; Ying Ruocheng
- Composer: Ennio Morricone
- Countries of origin: United States; Italy
- Original language: English
- No. of seasons: 1
- No. of episodes: 8

Production
- Executive producers: Giovanni Bertolucci; Franco Cristaldi; Vincenzo Labella
- Producer: Vincenzo Labella
- Production locations: China; Italy; Mongolia; Morocco
- Cinematography: Pasqualino De Santis
- Editor: John A. Martinelli
- Running time: 545 min.
- Production companies: Vides Cinematografica RAI Radiotelevisione Italiana National Broadcasting Company (NBC) Procter & Gamble Productions (PGP) Tokyo Broadcasting System (TBS)
- Budget: $17 million

Original release
- Network: NBC; RAI
- Release: May 16 – May 19, 1982

Marco Polo is a 1982 American-Italian television miniseries originally broadcast by NBC in the United States and by RAI in Italy. It stars Kenneth Marshall as Marco Polo, the 13th-century Venetian merchant and explorer. The series also features appearances by Denholm Elliott, Anne Bancroft, John Gielgud, Burt Lancaster, Ian McShane, Leonard Nimoy, and others. It was originally broadcast in four episodes, where episodes 1 and 4 were twice as long as episodes 2 and 3. The series is sometimes divided into six equally long episodes.

Set in the 13th century, the series follows the adventures of Marco Polo, who departs with his father and his uncle to China. His journey through Asia lasts three and a half years and leads him through barren deserts and vast steppes. Marco spends several years in Beijing as a guest of the Great Khan, earning the trust of and respect from the Emperor.

== Plot ==
=== Part One ===
Marco Polo accompanies a Venetian merchant fleet as it stops for the night. A raid results in Marco being taken as prisoner.

In the year 1299, in the Italian city of Genoa, Rustichello da Pisa is held in a prison cell and questioned for information about Marco Polo. Marco Polo is revealed to be another prisoner but is accused of lying. The people questioning him are Brother Damien of Milan and Fillipe of Genoa, both members of the Order of Saint Dominic. Both are concerned that the tales of Marco Polo are heretical and will corrupt the minds of people, especially children. As Rustichello narrates, the story shifts to Marco Polo in his youth.

In his youth, Marco Polo was eager to hear merchants tell stories of their travels. As his mother lies on her deathbed, Marco's aunt Flora laments for his father, who has been away since before Marco was born and has sent nothing but items that she sees as idols of another god.

His father Niccolò and uncle Matteo Polo return home. They appear before the Council of the Republic of Venice, hoping for a possible alliance between the Mongols and the Republic. The Polo brothers show the council Mongolian currency and tell stories of the might of the Mongols, but they are quickly rebuked due to the pagan nature of the Mongols. The council has no interest in an alliance with the Mongols. The Doge of Venice however, sees the potential of the Polos' quest and advises them to return to China immediately.

Marco's father and uncle tell him of stories of the great Kublai Khan and his court in the Yuan Dynasty in China. Intrigued, Marco asks them to take him with them, but he is refused.

As Niccolò and Matteo attempt to find a sponsor for their next voyage, the father of a girl Marco earlier attempted to run away with demands compensation for Marco taking her virginity. Niccolò and Maffeo realise that they must take Marco with them on their journey, but only as far as Jerusalem until the heat dies down in Venice. A few days before arriving at Jerusalem, Marco has his first taste of the world when he witnesses a contingent of Crusaders massacre a tribe of Bedouin.

In the city church, the Polos, at the favour of the cardinal of Acre, receive some oil of the Sepulchre via a letter from the Cardinal of Acre. The priest of the church is extremely reluctant to do it but grants it. They then receive a message that the cardinal of Acre wants to see them again. When they return to him he reveals that he has been chosen to be the new pope by the college of Cardinals, and is providing two priests to accompany them so they can tell Kublai Khan about Christianity. In real life, it corresponds with the election of Teobaldo Visconti as Pope Gregory X.

As the Polo family ready themselves to go East again, they are caught up in an ambush that kills Marco's friend Giulo.

=== Part Two ===
As they are taken prisoner, the party is taken before the Bedouin leader. The captor leader is an Italian who converted to Islam after being taken prisoner in Tripoli. He sets the party free.

Back in Genoa in 1299, Rustichello is given a break from the interrogation. They find it hard to believe that the world to the East is full of pagan culture and gods. They do reject it but want more information to consider. Looking at the things he wrote down, the council are impressed by the depth of material. Picking up where he left off in the story, Rustichello says the party reaches Badakshan, Afghanistan in 1273 and hunts for food. Continuing on into winter of the same year, they suffer an avalanche from Muztagh-ata mountain and Marco wakes alone in a mountain temple, which is filled with riches and statues and the people are very welcoming. It is revealed that the temple is a Buddhist temple in Tibet. Here he questions his spirituality at the monks' invitation study Nirvana, an invitation that was difficult to refuse.

By spring of 1275, they reach the steppes of modern-day Gansu province, where they encounter a Mongol tribe. They stay at a Chinese-speaking group who entertain them for the visit. At night, Marco engages in a wrestling match in which he is defeated. They spend a few days there.

Back in 1299, Rustichello's writings end there and the priests demand that he continue writing the stories he kept to himself.

Marco Polo arrives in the city of Shangdu in 1275. They are granted a meeting with Kublai Khan, who greets them generously. His wife is very accommodating and hosts a feast in the Polos' honour.

=== Part Three ===
That night in Shangdu, Marco Polo family is treated by Kublai Khan to a feast plus live entertainment for the night. The next morning, Kublai Khan and his son, Prince Chinkin invite Marco Polo to a private meeting on the waterfront in a lake. He converses with the khan, discussing a lot of things. One of the things he is intrigued by is the devices they have to tell time, that is different from using the solar devices the western employ. The ruler asks for knowledge of other places, a request he responds with fascinated places such as Kashgar and cloths produced with asbestos. Pleasing the ruler with his knowledge, Marco Polo gains favor for his frankness to the ruler. Marco is tasked to update the maps of the empire, a task he eagerly does.

Marco continues to bond with Chinkin, the ruler's son. As they went on a hunting trip, the son has an epileptic seizure and is brought back to Kublai. Marco Polo is appointed at a position in the court of the Kublai Khan. Due to his rise of the power in the court, he is gaining new enemies: the priests led by Saiamon who believe that the Kublai is coming under bad influence from foreigner influence. As Chinkin and Marco arrive at the Great Wall, he learns the Great Wall is constructed by people commanded by the emperor. He is also told of the story of Meng Jiangnu, who cries of the grief of her dead husband, who worked on the great wall, destroyed a portion of the wall so it was unable to be reconstructed.

Later that night, Marco's good Chinese friend is executed because he witnessed the epilepsy of the son of Kublai.

In the autumn, Kublia Khan's subordinate in Persia, Ahmad Fanakati, returns to the Kublai's place, with the news that he has completed the conquest of the empire.

As Ahmad meets Marco Polo, he is planning more conquests to strengthen the presence of the Mongols.

As Marco's father and uncle work on trade routes, Marco is given some time to relax at the imperial complex and shown some of the people and life. He met some of the astronomers of China, then shown typical acupuncture done on the streets. However, it's impossible to avoid the interest of the Chinese who have grown a bit fond of the non-Asian.

That evening, the gathering of leaders introduces rulers from the region, including one who has converted to Christianity. Kublai plans to invade Japan, but the advisers are cautious and believe it is foolish because they are experts on horseback and weak in the sea. Afterwards, Kublai Khan's consort convincingly tells Kublai to forgo invasion of Japan, since the other leaders did not dare to stand up to Kublai due to his fearsome temper.

Marco Polo's father and uncle return to him. After the reunion, Ahmad Fanakati grants the Polo family an audience. He tells Marco of two things to learn. One, Marco is to not trust anyone, especially people who seem friendly. Second, he reveals that he is the master at the financial system of the Empire and wants to send Marco to the region of Yanzhou to help collect taxes to the treasury. Marco is to go out and consort to the person named Talib, who is to be trusted. And no one else.

The next day, Kublai spends time with the Chinkin. Chinkin is to be married and is not welcome to the people who despise Marco Polo. As he bids him farewell, the son leaves. That afternoon, Marco Polo leaves for Yanzhou.

=== Part Four ===
As Marco Polo comes at a river, an assassin fails, having been killed by Jacopo.

Back in 1299 in Genoa, Rustichello da Pisa, is to be summoned to answer for his words. The brothers are deeply resistant and intolerant in the belief of the stories Rustichello has told. They are undignified about it.

As Marco Polo arrives at Talib's place, he is told people know of the attempt on his life, since news travels extremely fast. Arriving into town, he witnesses a short demonstration of protest against the rulers. Meeting the head of the town, Marco is welcomed to the house, seeking his advice. He is warned that the town's secrets are best not be revealed, having a white woman resident accidentally reveals herself. As he goes outside, he meets a villager Wang Zhu preparing a boat for the Dragon Boat Festival. Wang Zhu reveals that corruption occurs greatly and Talib pockets half of the town's tax, sending the other half to the empire's treasury. The next day, Wang Zhu takes the Polos to visit the Immortals, wise men who live in the mountain. One Immortal tells of the yin-yang.

As Marco wants to see his departed father and uncle, the resident foreign lady, Monica wishes to take him to them. As they pause for the night, they find his father and uncle. When they go back, they witness Talib's soldiers raid and ransack the village, having not paid the taxes.

Upon completion of the tax collection, Jacopo decides to stay while Marco and the family leave back to Kublai's court.

In the court of the Kublai Khan, the two commanders in the invasion of Japan report back their defeat. Kublai Khan orders their death.

Rebels sneak into the imperial palace to assassinate Achmed as his corruption is ruining Chinese peasants' lives. The plot is uncovered just in time, and Kublai orders the deaths of everybody involved, including Achmed.

A governor of a region, Nayan has risen up in revolt. Marco reaches out in peace but fails. In a private meeting after a meeting of the most prominent leaders, Marco Polo is asked: "what would you do if you were the great khan?". Mercy is the answer to the rebellious Nayan. However, Kublai Khan declares mercy to be inconsistent to the khans. He leads an army to crush the army but finds none as Nayan has dispersed the troops to avoid much bloodshed.

Years pass and Marco Polo decides to leave. Kublai Khan is disappointed and reluctantly sees him off in one final ride. Two years later in 1294, the great khan dies, never having seen Marco again.

Back in 1299 Genoa, Marco Polo is brought before the court in Genoa. The knowledge is believed to be heretical and different from "current" knowledge. However, Brother Damien confirms the truth by knowledge produced by various travelers and Arab traders. The monks confirm that the knowledge brought back from the East are not heretical, as sailors and traders have confirmed their star charts. Furthermore, they have brought similar stories, thus exonerating Marco Polo who is released as a free man.

== Cast ==
- Kenneth Marshall as Marco Polo
- Denholm Elliott as Niccolò Polo
- Tony Vogel as Matteo Polo
- David Warner as Rustichello da Pisa
- Burt Lancaster as Pope Gregory X
- Vernon Dobtcheff as Pietro d'Abano
- John Gielgud as Doge of Venice
- John Houseman as Patriarch of Aquileia
- F. Murray Abraham as Jacopo
- Anne Bancroft as Marco's Mother
- James Hong as Phags-pa
- Ian McShane as Ali Ben Yussouf
- Leonard Nimoy as Achmet
- Mario Adorf as Giovanni
- Patrick Mower as Brother Damian
- Tony Lo Bianco as Brother Nicholas
- Marilù Tolo as Donna Fiammetta
- Ying Ruocheng as Kublai Khan
- Junichi Ishida as Prince Chinkin
- Tetsurō Tamba as Saiamon
- Gordon Mitchell as Arnolfo
- Sada Thompson as Aunt Flora
- Soon-Tek Oh as Wang Zhu
- Georgia Slowe as Caterina
- Kathryn Dowling as Monica
- Zhengyin Cao as Yanzhou Governor
- Terry Raven as Talib
- Henry O as Astrologer

== Production ==
The miniseries was initially produced by Italian broadcaster RAI together with Procter & Gamble, NBC, Japanese advertising agency Dentsu and the Chinese CCCC organization.

Michael Ontkean was originally cast as Marco Polo but left a week prior to filming. He was replaced by Mandy Patinkin but he too left saying he couldn't cope after less than two weeks of filming. He was replaced by Ken Marshall.

== Reception ==
The miniseries won two Emmy Awards, from nine nominations, at the 34th Primetime Emmy Awards in 1982. For his work in Episode III, Enrico Sabbatini won for Outstanding Costume Design for a Regular or Limited Series, while producer Vincenzo Labella won for Outstanding Limited Series.

== See also ==
- List of historical drama films
- List of historical drama films of Asia
