= Don Guidice =

American film editor (1932–2010)

- Born: Donald Guidice; October 14, 1932; Los Angeles, California, USA
- Died: March 31, 2010 (aged 77); Newport Beach, California, USA
- Occupation: film editor
- Years active: 1963–1992

Don Guidice (October 14, 1932 – March 11, 2010) was an American film editor. He was nominated at the 48th Academy Awards in the category of Best Film Editing (shared with Fredric Steinkamp) for Three Days of the Condor.

== Selected filmography ==
- It Happened at the World's Fair (1963) (uncredited)
- The Greatest Story Ever Told (1965) (assistant editor)
- They Shoot Horses, Don't They? (1969) (assistant editor)
- A New Leaf (1971)
- Jeremiah Johnson (1972) (assistant editor)
- The Yakuza (1974)
- Three Days of the Condor (1975)
- Harry and Walter Go to New York (1976)
- Tilt (1979)
- Hard to Hold (1984)
- Police Academy 2: Their First Assignment (1985)
