= Blaze of Glory (Star Trek: Deep Space Nine) =

- Star Trek: Deep Space Nine episode
- Episode no.: Season 5 Episode 23
- Directed by: Kim Friedman
- Written by: Ira Steven Behr; Robert Hewitt Wolfe
- Production code: 521
- Original air date: May 12, 1997

Guest appearances
- Kenneth Marshall as Michael Eddington; J. G. Hertzler as Martok; Aron Eisenberg as Nog; Gretchen German as Rebecca

Episode chronology
← Previous "Children of Time"	Next → "Empok Nor"
- Star Trek: Deep Space Nine season 5

"Blaze of Glory" is the 121st episode of the television series Star Trek: Deep Space Nine, the 23rd episode of the fifth season. The episode aired on television on May 12, 1997. The episode concludes a three-part storyline started in the episode "For the Cause" and continued in "For the Uniform".

Set in the 24th century, the series follows the adventures of the crew of Deep Space Nine, a Starfleet-run space station near the planet Bajor, as the Bajorans recover from a decades-long occupation by the imperialistic Cardassians. In the middle seasons of the series, the Deep Space Nine crew comes into conflict with the Maquis, a renegade terrorist group who oppose a peace treaty between the United Federation of Planets and the Cardassians. This episode concludes the story of the Maquis and of Michael Eddington (played by Kenneth Marshall), a former Starfleet officer who joined the Maquis, after Cardassia allies itself with a powerful empire known as the Dominion.

== Plot ==
Captain Benjamin Sisko receives a recording of an intercepted message: the few surviving Maquis terrorists who have not been wiped out by Cardassia's Dominion allies have launched a massive retaliatory missile strike against Cardassia. The missiles are believed to be equipped with cloaking devices, and unless they are stopped, Sisko fears the Dominion response will envelop the entire quadrant in all-out war. Sisko goes to the message's intended recipient: Michael Eddington, now in prison. Eddington refuses to tell Sisko how to stop the missiles; so Sisko takes Eddington with him to compel him to help.

Upon entering the Badlands, a dangerous region of space where the Maquis hid out, Eddington is still uncooperative. Sisko traps him into taking over the runabout's controls to evade two pursuing Dominion warships. Eddington finally agrees to help Sisko find the launch site to deactivate the missiles, but vows to kill him afterwards.

Meanwhile, in a side plot back on Deep Space Nine, cadet Nog earns the respect of the Klingon soldiers on the station by learning to stand up to them.

Sisko and Eddington arrive at Athos IV, a tiny, fog-bound planet where the launch site is hidden. Upon landing on the planet, they discover the facility is crawling with Jem'Hadar, the Dominion's soldiers, with many of the Maquis dead. Eddington is shocked and stunned: the Maquis had been on the verge of declaring their colonies an independent nation from both Starfleet and the Cardassians. Sisko admits that Starfleet let the Maquis down.

Sisko and Eddington fight their way to the command center, where Sisko is surprised to find a dozen Maquis prisoners, including Eddington's wife, Rebecca Sullivan. Eddington reveals that there are no missiles at all — Rebecca sent the message as a code to let Eddington know they had fallen back to Athos IV. Eddington knew he would need Sisko's help to evacuate them, and manipulated him in order to reach the location. Sisko is furious at being lied to, but relieved that all-out war is no longer imminent. He and Eddington fight off the Jem'Hadar while directing the prisoners toward the runabout, but Eddington is shot. Insisting Sisko and the others continue without him, Eddington stays behind to fend off the soldiers and is killed.

== Reception ==
In 2014, Keith R.A. DeCandido reviewed the episode for Tor.com. He gave the episode a mixed review, describing it as entertaining to watch and praising the performances of Avery Brooks and Kenneth Marshall as Sisko and Eddington, but characterizing the Maquis storyline as a whole as underdeveloped and unsatisfying. Zack Handlen, reviewing the episode for The A.V. Club, largely praised it, especially the interactions between Sisko and Eddington, and noted how the story is constructed to allow Eddington to fulfill his self-image as a tragic hero.

In 2015, Geek.com recommended this episode as "essential watching" for their abbreviated Star Trek: Deep Space Nine binge-watching guide, as the conclusion of the Maquis story arc.
