= For the Uniform =

- Star Trek: Deep Space Nine episode
- Episode no.: Season 5 Episode 13
- Directed by: Victor Lobl
- Written by: Peter Allan Fields
- Production code: 511
- Original air date: February 3, 1997

Guest appearances
- Kenneth Marshall as Michael Eddington; Eric Pierpoint as Sanders; Aron Eisenberg as Nog

Episode chronology
← Previous "The Begotten"	Next → "In Purgatory's Shadow"
- Star Trek: Deep Space Nine season 5

"For the Uniform" is the 111th episode of Star Trek: Deep Space Nine, the 13th episode of the fifth season. First broadcast on February 3, 1997, the episode's premiere was watched by 5,680,000 viewers. It was written by Peter Allan Fields. It continues the storyline started in the episode "For the Cause". The storyline concludes in the episode "Blaze of Glory".

Set in the 24th century, the series follows the adventures of the crew of the space station Deep Space Nine near the planet Bajor, as the Bajorans recover from a decades-long occupation by the imperialistic Cardassians. In the middle seasons of the series, as the United Federation of Planets maintains an uneasy peace with Cardassia, a recurring plot thread involves the Maquis, a renegade terrorist group of Federation nationals trying to strike back against the Cardassians. In this episode, Kenneth Marshall returns in his recurring role as Michael Eddington, a former Starfleet officer who has defected to the Maquis; he is hunted by Benjamin Sisko, the captain of Deep Space Nine, who holds a grudge against Eddington for his betrayal.

== Plot ==
Sisko encounters Michael Eddington, his former Starfleet Security Chief, who betrayed him and joined the Maquis. Obsessed with capturing the traitor, Sisko pursues him in his ship, the USS Defiant. But when Sisko gives the order to fire, the Defiant experiences a massive computer failure—caused by Eddington. He leaves Sisko angry and humiliated, and facing a long trip home.

The Defiant is towed back to Deep Space Nine by the starship Malinche, and Chief O'Brien begins the massive job of bringing the ship back on-line. Adding insult to injury, Sisko learns that Captain Sanders of the Malinche has been given the assignment to apprehend Eddington, since Starfleet has lost faith in Sisko's ability to do the job. But when he learns that Eddington is attacking Cardassian colonies with a weapon that renders planets uninhabitable to Cardassians, the Malinche is too far away to intercept him. Sisko sees his chance, and although the Defiant is not yet fully repaired, he and his crew take the ship back into space.

The ship lurches out of the station and soon encounters Eddington again. Eddington taunts Sisko by sending him a copy of the novel Les Misérables and comparing Sisko to the obsessive policeman Javert. The captain realizes too late that he was baited to false coordinates. As the crew sets off to find Eddington's real location, a distress call is received from the Malinche—Maquis forces have ambushed and disabled the starship.

Sisko determines Eddington's next planetary target, but is too late to stop him from releasing his weapon into the atmosphere. The Defiant chases after Eddington's fleeing ship, but Eddington cripples a transport vessel evacuating Cardassian civilians, forcing Sisko to break off his pursuit and rescue the helpless Cardassians.

Sisko realizes that Eddington sees himself as a noble hero and Sisko as the obsessed villain. In order to stop Eddington, Sisko decides he must do something truly villainous. He broadcasts a message to the Maquis, threatening to poison the atmosphere of one of their colony worlds with biological weapons in retaliation for their attacks. When Eddington calls his bluff, Sisko carries out the attack, and the Maquis scramble to evacuate. Sisko threatens to do the same to every Maquis colony in the Demilitarized Zone, and Eddington, realizing Sisko is serious, makes the "heroic" gesture of offering himself in exchange. Eddington is captured, and Sisko's vendetta is finally over.

== Reception ==
In 2013, The A.V. Club was impressed by the moral complexity of the plot, and also praised the 'holographic communicator' as a "cool" way to have more scenes between Eddington and Sisko. Keith DeCandido of Tor.com gave the episode 8 out of 10.

In 2018, Vulture.com rated "For the Uniform" the 10th best episode of Star Trek: Deep Space Nine, noting a focus on the story arcs of Michael Eddington and the Maquis.

In 2016, Empire ranked this the 27th best episode out of the top 50 episodes of all the 700+ Star Trek television episodes.
