= Hard Time (Star Trek: Deep Space Nine) =

- Star Trek: Deep Space Nine episode
- Episode no.: Season 4 Episode 19
- Directed by: Alexander Singer
- Story by: Daniel Keys Moran; Lynn Barker
- Teleplay by: Robert Hewitt Wolfe
- Cinematography by: Kris Krosskove; Jonathan West
- Production code: 491
- Original air date: April 15, 1996

Guest appearances
- Rosalind Chao as Keiko; Margot Rose as Rinn; Hana Hatae as Molly; F. J. Rio as Muñiz; Craig Wasson as Ee'char

Episode chronology
← Previous "Rules of Engagement"	Next → "Shattered Mirror"
- Star Trek: Deep Space Nine season 4

"Hard Time" is the 91st episode of the American syndicated science fiction television series Star Trek: Deep Space Nine, the 19th episode of the fourth season.

Set in the 24th century, the series follows the adventures of the crew of the space station Deep Space Nine. In this episode, Deep Space Nine's chief of operations Miles O'Brien attempts to return to his normal life while coping with secrets from his experience of long-term incarceration.

== Plot ==
Chief O'Brien is unjustly convicted of espionage on the planet Argratha. Instead of incarcerating convicts, the Argrathi correctional facility implants them with memories of years of imprisonment in a few hours of actual time. O'Brien experiences twenty years in prison, never doubting the reality of his situation, before the Argrathi declare his sentence complete and release him. The swiftness of the process means that O'Brien is arrested, convicted and serves his sentence before Starfleet even hears about it.

On returning to Deep Space Nine, O'Brien tries to adjust back to life on board the station, but his experiences while imprisoned still trouble him. Although he tells Dr. Bashir that he was alone in prison, flashbacks reveal that he had a cellmate, Ee'char, who taught him how to survive while incarcerated. O'Brien has recurrent hallucinations of Ee'char, and begins to exhibit habitual behaviours that he "picked up" while "incarcerated," such as hoarding food and sleeping on the hard floor instead of his bed.

Over time, O'Brien becomes increasingly irritable and reclusive. He has an argument with Bashir, and assaults Quark when he has to wait to be served at Quark's bar. Captain Sisko later relieves O'Brien of duty, placing him on medical leave and ordering him to attend the counselling sessions that he has been avoiding. After he returns to his quarters, he almost hits his daughter Molly when she tries to get his attention. Instantly filled with shame and fear over what he might end up doing to the people he cares about, he flees to a cargo bay and starts tearing the place apart. Finding a weapons locker, he sets a phaser on maximum, preparing to take his own life.

Bashir follows O'Brien and finds him just in time. O'Brien tells Bashir that he killed Ee'char over a few pieces of bread Ee'char was saving for the both of them, mistakenly thinking Ee'char had been hiding the bread from him; and that the guilt has been eating away at his conscience. O'Brien is convinced he is an animal, but Bashir tells him that if he truly were, he would have felt no regret for killing Ee'char, and so O'Brien is still human deep down inside. Bashir ultimately prescribes a new course of heavy treatment and soon has O'Brien on the way to recovery.

== Reception ==
In 2014, Gizmodo ranked "Hard Time" as the 42nd best episode of Star Trek, out of over 700 ones made by that time.

In 2015, Geek.com recommended this episode as "essential watching" for their abbreviated Star Trek: Deep Space Nine binge-watching guide.

In 2016, Empire ranked this the 47th best out of the top 50 episodes of all the 700 plus Star Trek television episodes.

== See also ==
- Simulated reality
