= Rules of Engagement (Star Trek: Deep Space Nine) =

- Star Trek: Deep Space Nine episode
- Episode no.: Season 4 Episode 18
- Directed by: LeVar Burton
- Story by: Bradley Thompson; David Weddle
- Teleplay by: Ronald D. Moore
- Production code: 490
- Original air date: April 8, 1996

Guest appearances
- Ron Canada as Ch'Pok; Deborah Strang as Admiral T'Lara

Episode chronology
← Previous "Accession"	Next → "Hard Time"
- Star Trek: Deep Space Nine season 4

"Rules of Engagement" was the 90th episode of the science fiction television series Star Trek: Deep Space Nine, the 18th episode of the fourth season. It was directed by LeVar Burton, and features guest star Ron Canada as a visiting Klingon prosecutor. The episode features special effect sequences with the USS Defiant and the Klingon Bird of Prey spaceships.

Set in the 24th century, the series takes place on Deep Space Nine, a fictional space station near the planet Bajor, as the Bajorans recover from a brutal decades-long occupation by the Cardassians. In the fourth season, Cardassia is at war with the Klingon Empire, leading to tensions between the Klingons and the United Federation of Planets. In this episode, Lt. Cdr. Worf, a Klingon who is an officer in the Federation's Starfleet, is charged with destroying a Klingon civilian transport and faces an extradition hearing in which the Klingon Empire seeks to have him tried in Klingon court.

== Plot ==
Worf commands the Defiant on an escort mission to guard Cardassian medical vessels. While under attack from Klingon raiders, a vessel de-cloaks in front of the Defiant. Expecting the vessel to be a Klingon warship, Worf orders it fired upon immediately without visual confirmation. However, the destroyed ship turns out to be a Klingon civilian transport, and the Klingon Empire wants Worf tried in their court.

Admiral T'Lara presides over Worf's extradition hearing aboard Deep Space Nine. Captain Sisko serves as Worf's defense counsel. Ch'Pok, the advocate representing the Klingon Empire, argues that Worf attacked due to uncontrollable bloodlust and was motivated by seeking revenge against the Empire for his family's dishonor, rather than following proper rules of engagement. He calls Worf's friends and acquaintances to testify. Jadzia Dax testifies that, in her experience, Worf is capable of restraining his bloodlust, but that he played a holosuite game before the mission in which he played a warrior who murders civilians. Quark testifies that Worf stated before the mission that he was hoping for an attack. The combat-experienced Chief O'Brien says that he would not have given the order to fire if he had been in command. After Worf testifies that he would never attack an unarmed opponent, Ch'Pok baits Worf into attacking him, contradicting his claim.

In the end, Constable Odo's investigation uncovers evidence that the names of all the 441 people who were reported to have died on the transport were the exact same names of the people who were reported to have crashed on a distant planet three months prior to the battle. Sisko concludes that the entire incident was staged by the Empire to frame Worf for the purpose of smearing the Federation. Despite having no civilian deaths on his conscience, Worf admits that he did accept the mission assignment because he was hoping for vengeance against the Klingon Empire. Sisko reprimands Worf for accepting the mission for that purpose, and for not following Starfleet regulations and identifying the vessel before firing upon it; but he tells him that he will make a fine captain some day.

== Production ==
The episode is very loosely inspired by the 1988 USS Vincennes shootdown of Iran Air Flight 655, a passenger flight. The episode includes a Federation officer accused of performing such an act of recklessly destroying a civilian craft, although differs in that the destruction of the craft was merely a ruse with no lives lost. Early versions of the story considered having it be Captain Sisko who was accused of such an act.

== Reception ==
Zack Handlen wrote a mostly positive review in 2013 for The A.V. Club. He thought the structure of the episode, of flashbacks interspersed with court testimony, worked well to keep the focus on Worf and liven up what could be an overly dry trial otherwise. He thought the reveal that the incident was all a ruse was the least interesting part of the episode, and a sop to TV show conventions that do not allow the status quo to be disrupted. Handlen still ultimately admired the episode for giving some teeth to Worf's decision and progress in his character, notably in Sisko and Worf's final conversation. Even if Worf was ultimately innocent, it was still true that he was a compromised commander, being perhaps over-eager to even the score with the Klingons.

In a 2014 retrospective in Reactor magazine, author Keith R. A. DeCandido criticized the episode as poor, scoring it a 2/10 and the overall worst episode of the fourth season of Deep Space Nine. DeCandido thought that while Avery Brooks did a good job as Sisko in his defense of Worf, the plot of the episode made no sense. The episode directly mentions that the Klingons have no extradition treaty with the Federation (after the events of "The Way of the Warrior"), and that the attempt to frame Worf was strained and weak—hardly a cause for the Federation to throw one of their decorated officers in a cell, even temporarily. Ch’Pok's claim that a civilian ship would be cloaked, come to the site of a battle, and decloak precisely in the path of the Defiant, in the vastness of space, as an innocent coincidence was ludicrous on its face to DeCandido. While more of a nitpick, the question of how the Klingon plotters could have even known that Worf would be commanding the Defiant that day was left unexplored by the episode.

This episode's Nielsen rating during its original airing was 5.8 points.
