= For the Cause (Star Trek: Deep Space Nine) =

- Star Trek: Deep Space Nine episode
- Episode no.: Season 4 Episode 22
- Directed by: James L. Conway
- Story by: Mark Gehred-O'Connell
- Teleplay by: Ronald D. Moore
- Production code: 494
- Original air date: May 6, 1996

Guest appearances
- Kenneth Marshall as Michael Eddington; Penny Johnson as Kasidy Yates; Tracy Middendorf as Ziyal; Andrew J. Robinson as Garak; John Prosky as Brathaw; Steven Vincent Leigh as Reese

Episode chronology
← Previous "The Muse"	Next → "To the Death"
- Star Trek: Deep Space Nine season 4

"For the Cause" is the 22nd episode of the fourth season of the science fiction television series Star Trek: Deep Space Nine. It was first broadcast on May 6, 1996.

Set in the 24th century, the series follows the adventures of the crew of the space station Deep Space Nine near the planet Bajor, as the Bajorans recover from a decades-long occupation by the imperialistic Cardassians. In the middle seasons of the series, as the United Federation of Planets maintains an uneasy peace with Cardassia, a recurring plot thread involves the Maquis, a renegade terrorist group of Federation nationals trying to strike back against the Cardassians.

In this episode, suspicion falls upon civilian freighter captain Kasidy Yates (Penny Johnson), the girlfriend of station commander Benjamin Sisko, as a possible Maquis accomplice, but the true Maquis agent turns out to be a member of Sisko's crew, Lieutenant Commander Michael Eddington (Kenneth Marshall).

== Plot ==
The Federation plans to deliver several replicators through Deep Space Nine to Cardassia following attacks by the Klingons that debilitated the Cardassian industrial base. Eddington briefs DS9's command staff that Starfleet fears that the shipment will be intercepted by the Maquis. Eddington and Security Chief Odo warn Captain Sisko that they believe his girlfriend, Kasidy Yates, is working with the Maquis. Sisko is reluctant to believe them, but after Yates refuses to allow her cargo to be inspected, he instructs Lieutenant Commander Worf to follow Yates' ship, the Xhosa, in the Defiant. Worf confirms that the Xhosa delivered supplies to a Maquis ship in a region of space known as the Badlands.

Eddington tells Sisko he is unwilling to take responsibility for arresting Yates, so Sisko takes command of the Defiant to follow the Xhosa to its next rendezvous with the Maquis. When no Maquis ship arrives, Odo suggests this operation might have been a ruse to lure Sisko away from Deep Space Nine. Sisko confronts Yates on the Xhosa. She claims she has only been delivering medical supplies to the Maquis, and was told that today's delivery was urgent. Fearing deception, Sisko lets Yates go and sets course back to Deep Space Nine.

Meanwhile, in Sisko's absence, Eddington orders Deep Space Nine's security crew to transfer the replicators to a waiting ship. After rendering second-in-command Major Kira unconscious, he removes his badge and flees the station. When Sisko returns, Eddington contacts him to acknowledge his defection to the Maquis and promise further trouble if the Federation aids the Cardassians. Sisko vows to capture and arrest Eddington himself. Later, Yates returns to the station alone, having left her crew in the Badlands, to turn herself in. Sisko and Yates have an emotional embrace before she is taken to the brig.

In a side plot, Tora Ziyal, the half-Bajoran daughter of the former Cardassian prefect of Bajor, Gul Dukat, attempts to befriend the exiled Cardassian spy-turned-tailor Elim Garak. Garak fears that Ziyal has been instructed to kill him, since Garak was responsible for the torture and death of Dukat's father years ago. Ultimately she persuades Garak that she is merely interested in being his friend, as the only other Cardassian on Deep Space Nine.

== Production ==
Writer Mark Gehred-O'Connell was inspired by the Oklahoma City bombing to write this episode. Specifically, he recalled how in the days following the bombing, suspicion fell upon people of Middle Eastern descent as the culprits, when in fact, the true culprit was Timothy McVeigh, a white American. Gehred-O'Connell decided to write a story in which Deep Space Nine was the target of a terrorist attack, after which suspicion fell upon the least likely person, Kasidy Yates, as the prime suspect. As the story evolved, the attack upon the station was dispensed with, and the trust between Kasidy and Sisko became the thematic focus of the episode. The episode's Sisko-Eddington storyline would be continued in the episode "For the Uniform" and concludes in the episode "Blaze of Glory".

After being played by Cyia Batten in "Indiscretion" and "Return to Grace", Ziyal is played in this episode by Tracy Middendorf. This is Middendorf's only appearance in the role, as Melanie Smith later acquires the role permanently in "In Purgatory's Shadow", playing her until the character's final appearance in "Sacrifice of Angels".

The set of the Xhosa bridge was created from pieces previously used as the interior of the Saratoga, on which Sisko had served as First Officer, as seen in the pilot episode, "Emissary".

The mention of Tholian punctuality by Kasidy in the second scene of Act 2 was writer Ron Moore's tribute to the original series episode, "The Tholian Web", in which those aliens first appeared. The reference by Jake Sisko in Act 3 to the 1961 Yankees and the 1978 Red Sox was a tribute by producer Ira Steven Behr to his two favorite baseball teams.

== Reception ==
In 2020, James Whitbrook, writing for io9, included the episode in a list of "must-watch" episodes.
