= Tribunal (Star Trek: Deep Space Nine) =

- Star Trek: Deep Space Nine episode
- Episode no.: Season 2 Episode 25
- Directed by: Avery Brooks
- Written by: Bill Dial
- Cinematography by: Marvin Rush
- Production code: 445
- Original air date: June 6, 1994

Guest appearances
- Rosalind Chao as Keiko O'Brien; Richard Poe as Gul Evek; Caroline Lagerfelt as Makbar; John Beck as Boone; Julian Christopher as Cardassian Voice; Fritz Weaver as Kovat

Episode chronology
← Previous "The Collaborator"	Next → "The Jem'Hadar"
- Star Trek: Deep Space Nine season 2

"Tribunal" is the 25th and penultimate episode of the second season of the syndicated American science fiction television series Star Trek: Deep Space Nine, the 45th episode overall. It was the first episode of the series to air after the conclusion of Star Trek: The Next Generation, the series of which Deep Space Nine was a spinoff.

Set in the 24th century, the series follows the adventures on Deep Space Nine, a space station near the planet Bajor, as the Bajorans recover from a brutal, decades-long occupation by the authoritarian Cardassians. This episode provides a look at the Cardassian judicial system as DS9's operations chief Miles O'Brien (Colm Meaney) is put on trial on Cardassia, where the accused is declared guilty before the trial even begins.

This is the first of nine episodes of Deep Space Nine directed by Avery Brooks, who also played the role of Benjamin Sisko on the series.

== Plot ==
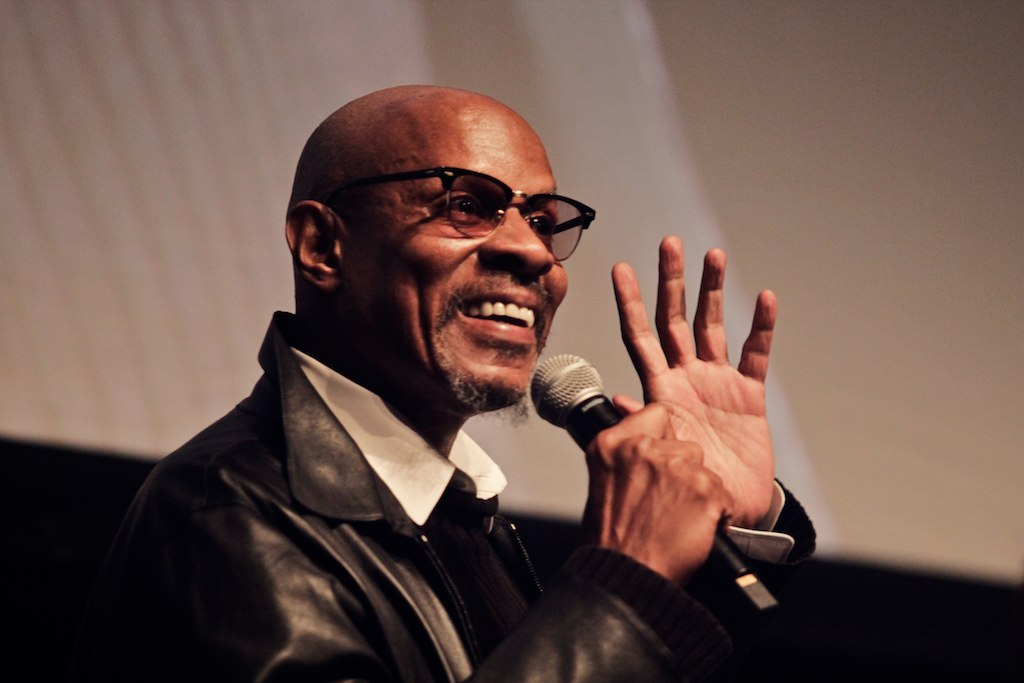
Avery Brooks both directed the episode and played the role of Sisko.

On his way to leave for a vacation with his wife Keiko, Miles O'Brien runs into an old Starfleet crewmate, Raymond Boone, who served with him years earlier in the battle of Setlik III. The two old comrades chat briefly and part ways. Shortly after their departure, the O'Briens' runabout is stopped by Cardassians, who search the ship and arrest Miles.

He is taken to a prison on Cardassia Prime and "processed"; his clothes are torn off and he is injured while resisting the guards. He meets his appointed advocate, Kovat, whose job is not to secure an acquittal but to engineer O'Brien's cooperation so that the people of Cardassia can perceive that justice is being done. No one will tell O'Brien what the charges against him are.

Back on Deep Space Nine, Keiko and Commander Sisko are informed that O'Brien has been declared guilty and sentenced to death, and will have a ceremonial "trial" in which the verdict is read. DS9's security chief Odo uses a legal technicality to get himself appointed to the team representing O'Brien. He and Keiko depart for Cardassia.

Meanwhile, the crew of Deep Space Nine discovers that a number of warheads have been stolen and have probably ended up in the possession of the Maquis, a faction that has been attacking the Cardassians. Major Kira finds a recording of O'Brien's voice requesting access to the warheads, but Lt. Dax finds evidence that the recording is a fabrication. When Odo offers to produce this evidence, the judge refuses to accept it.

The senior officers, working under the assumption that the Maquis stole the warheads, identify Boone as the person O'Brien spoke to prior to departing the station and arrest him. A shadowy figure tells Dr. Bashir that Boone is not a Maquis agent and that the Maquis had nothing to do with the theft of the warheads. The crew finds evidence that Boone exhibited a major personality change about eight years earlier. When Bashir examines him, he finds that the man is not the real Boone, but a Cardassian surgically altered to look like him; the real Boone had been captured at Setlik III and died in captivity. They conclude that the impostor was sent by the Cardassian High Command to steal the warheads and frame O'Brien as a Maquis collaborator, with the goal of forcing the Federation to remove its colonies along the demilitarized zone. As O'Brien's trial is about to conclude, Sisko enters the courtroom with the impostor; knowing that the deception is about to be exposed, the judge releases O'Brien. He and Keiko are finally able to leave for their vacation.

== Reception ==
In 2016, Medium recommended "Tribunal" in their abbreviated watch guide for Star Trek: Deep Space Nine. Tor.com gave it a 6 out of 10 rating.

== Releases ==
This episode, along with "The Jem'Hadar", was released on one VHS cassette in the United Kingdom, Star Trek: Deep Space Nine Vol. 23 - Tribunal/The Jem' Hadar.

This episode was released in 2017 on DVD with the complete series box set.

== See also ==
- "The Wounded" - a fourth season episode of Star Trek: The Next Generation where much of Chief O'Brien's past regarding the Cardassians and his service aboard the Rutledge is first revealed
