= Facets (Star Trek: Deep Space Nine) =

- Star Trek: Deep Space Nine episode
- Episode no.: Season 3 Episode 25
- Directed by: Cliff Bole
- Written by: René Echevarria
- Cinematography by: Jonathan West
- Production code: 471
- Original air date: June 12, 1995

Guest appearances
- Max Grodénchik as Rom; Aron Eisenberg as Nog; Chase Masterson as Leeta; Jefrey Alan Chandler as Guardian

Episode chronology
← Previous "Shakaar"	Next → "The Adversary"
- Star Trek: Deep Space Nine season 3

"Facets" is the 71st episode of the American syndicated science fiction television series Star Trek: Deep Space Nine, the 25th and penultimate episode of the third season, originally airing June 12, 1995.

Set in the 24th century, the series follows the adventures on the space station Deep Space Nine. This episode explores the Trill species, of which DS9 officer Jadzia Dax is a member: Jadzia and Dax are a host and symbiont, respectively, with the symbiont passed from host to host as the previous one dies. In this episode, Jadzia Dax undergoes a ritual that brings her face-to-face with the past hosts of Dax, forcing her to deal with feelings of inferiority as a Dax host herself. Meanwhile, the young Ferengi Nog takes a test as part of his application to Starfleet Academy, much to the dismay of his uncle Quark.

The episode achieved a Nielsen rating of 5.9 points when it debuted on syndicated television in June 1995.

== Plot ==
Jadzia Dax undergoes her Zhian'tara, the Trill rite of closure, in which she has the chance to meet Dax's previous seven hosts by temporarily transferring each one's memories from the symbiont into the minds of her friends. Commander Sisko, Major Kira, Dr. Bashir, Odo, Quark, Chief O'Brien, and Leeta have agreed to participate.

Kira accepts Lela Dax, and Jadzia sees that she is the origin of many of Dax's personality traits, which she herself now exhibits. O'Brien becomes the shy but friendly Tobin Dax. Leeta receives the personality of Emony Dax, a cheerful and talented gymnast. Quark is annoyed by having to take on the personality of the female Audrid Dax, who tells Jadzia about motherhood. Bashir is Torias Dax, an adventurous pilot. Sisko is restrained in a holding cell to receive the personality of Joran Dax, a violent murderer. When Jadzia comes to meet him, he tricks her into lowering the force field between them and tries to strangle her. After a brief struggle, Sisko regains control of his body.

Jadzia expresses anxiety about meeting the next Dax host, Curzon. Curzon Dax trained Jadzia when she was applying to receive a symbiont and recommended that she not be approved for joining. She later reapplied and was accepted, but despite having the Dax symbiont within her, she does not know Curzon's motivations for flunking her.

Odo, a shapeshifter, accepts Curzon Dax, reshaping his face to resemble Curzon. He evades her questions and declares he intends to stay within Odo, leaving Jadzia's self-esteem in tatters. Sisko offers to talk to Curzon, who was his mentor and friend many years ago, but Jadzia resolves to face the Old Man herself. When she demands to hear Curzon's story, he finally admits that he flunked Jadzia because he was in love with her. When Jadzia reassures Curzon that he will always be a part of her, he is satisfied and leaves Odo's body.

Also in this episode, Nog takes the exam that will allow him to later take the Starfleet Academy entrance exam. He is despondent when he learns that he failed, but his father Rom discovers that Quark rigged the exam so that Nog would fail. Furious, Rom confronts Quark for interfering in Nog's choice to enter Starfleet and threatens to destroy Quark's bar if Quark continues meddling. Sisko allows Nog to retake his exam, and this time he passes.

== Reception ==
In 2018, SyFy included this episode on their Jadzia Dax binge-watching guide.

In 2019, Tor.com noted this as an "essential" episode for the character of Odo, remarking that while it is not actually about Odo per se, it allowed the actor's abilities to be demonstrated as he must display different memories of the Dax symbiont. This episode is noted for focusing on the story of the character Jadzia Dax, demonstrating old personalities in the Dax symbiont such as displayed by Odo.

Max Grodenchick who plays Rom, said his favorite line of dialog from the series was from this episode, where he confronts Quark and threatens to burn his bar to the ground if he ever hurts Nog again.

== Releases ==
This episode was released on October 2, 1998 in Japan as part of the half-season LaserDisc box set 3rd Season vol.2. The format included both English and Japanese audio tracks, as well as Japanese captions.

The episode was released on June 3, 2003, in North America as part of the season 3 DVD box set.
