= Children of Time (Star Trek: Deep Space Nine) =

- Star Trek: Deep Space Nine episode
- Episode no.: Season 5 Episode 22
- Directed by: Allan Kroeker
- Story by: Gary Holland; Ethan H. Calk
- Teleplay by: René Echevarria
- Production code: 520
- Original air date: May 5, 1997

Guest appearances
- Gary Frank as Yedrin Dax; Jennifer S. Parsons as Miranda; Davida Williams as Lisa; Doren Fein as Molly

Episode chronology
| ← Previous "Soldiers of the Empire" | Next → "Blaze of Glory" |
- Star Trek: Deep Space Nine season 5

"Children of Time" is the 120th episode of the television series Star Trek: Deep Space Nine, the 22nd episode of the fifth season. In this episode, the crew of Deep Space Nine encounter their own descendants due to a time loop, and are faced with a difficult ethical decision.

== Plot ==
The starship Defiant investigates a planet surrounded by an unusual energy barrier. They find the planet is inhabited by 8,000 descendants of the Defiant's crew. The crew are told that tomorrow, when the Defiant tries to leave the planet, it will be thrown back in time. After the Defiant crashed on the planet 200 years ago, with no hope of contacting the Federation or repairing the ship, the stranded 48-person crew (including Dax, Sisko, O'Brien, Worf, and Dr. Bashir) remained and established a society. Unfortunately, the stranded Major Kira died a few weeks after the crash due to neural damage she incurred when the ship was passing through the energy barrier; Bashir did not have the medical equipment on the Defiant required to treat her.

In addition to their descendants, two members of the original crew of the Defiant still exist on the colony. The Changeling physiology of Odo has given him greater longevity than the rest (along with a more human appearance), while the Trill symbiont Dax continues to live on in a new host, Yedrin. Worf encounters the "Sons of Mogh", colonists who choose to live a Klingon lifestyle. The present-day Odo is trapped in his gelatinous form due to the fluctuations of the atmosphere, during which time the older Odo confesses that he has been in love with Kira since very early in their friendship.

The officers now realize they face a dilemma. If they use the Defiant to safely leave the planet, they will never have traveled back in time and the community on the planet will be erased from existence. But if they allow history to repeat itself by crashing in the past, they will never see their homes and loved ones, and Kira will die in a few weeks. Yedrin shows them a way out by using the quantum bubble to duplicate the ship and crew so that they can make both choices at once. But it turns out to be a trick, as he wants to survive; if they try it, they will just repeat the crash.

After much discussion, and joining in the community's planting festival, they choose to repeat the crash. The crew, however, survives, hypothesizing that Yedrin gave up his timeline for the crew. But Odo reveals to Kira that the older Odo loved Kira so much he would rather prevent her death than allow the 8,000 colonists to survive. He secretly changed their programmed flight plan so that they escape from the bubble—causing the colony to vanish from existence.

== Production ==
The outdoor shots of exoplanet "Gaia" were filmed in California.

== Reception ==
In 2015, Geek.com recommended this episode for their abbreviated Star Trek: Deep Space Nine binge-watching guide.

"Children of Time" was ranked as the fifth best romantic Star Trek episode by ScreenRant in 2017.

In 2018, Nerdist ranked this episode as the tenth most essential episode of the series.

In 2018, SyFy recommend this episode for its abbreviated watch guide for the Bajoran character Kira Nerys. They felt this was a fun episode and also important for the Odo - Kira relationship story.
