= Kenneth Marshall =

American actor (born 1950)

- Born: June 27, 1950 (age 75); New York City, U.S.
- Other name: Ken Marshall
- Education: University of Michigan (BA, MA); Juilliard School (GrDip)
- Occupation: Actor
- Years active: 1974–2003

Kenneth Marshall (born June 27, 1950) is a retired American actor.

== Early life ==
Marshall graduated from Saint Joseph High School in Saint Joseph, Michigan, in 1968.

== Career ==
Marshall was cast for a 1979 production of The Tempest.

In television, he played the title role in Giuliano Montaldo's 1982 television miniseries Marco Polo and portrayed the character Michael Eddington in the television series Star Trek: Deep Space Nine from 1994 until 1997.

Although appearing in such films such as Tilt (1979), The Skin (1981), and Feds (1988), he is perhaps best known for the starring role as Prince/King Colwyn in the fantasy adventure movie, Krull (1983).

In 2019 Marshall was inducted to the SJHS Performing Arts Center Hall of Fame

== Acting credits ==
=== Filmography ===
Year	Title	Role	Notes
1979	How the West Was Won	Pvt. Andrew Willow	Episode: "The Forgotten"
1979	Tilt	Neil Gallagher	
1981	The Skin	Jimmy Wren	
1982–83	Marco Polo	Marco Polo	Title role, miniseries
1983	Krull	Colwyn	
1983	Journey to Krull	Himself / Colwyn	Documentary short film
1983	On Trial	Himself/Guest	Documentary
1988	Feds	Brent Shepard	
1989	Double Exposure: The Story of Margaret Bourke-White	Chappie	TV movie
1989	In the Heat of the Night	Stephen Ainslee	Episode: "Rape"
1989	Baywatch	Chuck	Episode: "The Drowning Pool"
1990	Over My Dead Body	John Stanton	Episode: "No Ifs, Ands or Butlers"
1991	Hunter	Professor Gleason	2 (combined) episodes: "Fatal Obesession Part 1+2"
1991	Quantum Leap	Rodney Owens	Episode: "A Hunting We Will Go"
1992	The Commish	Sullivan Godfrey	Episode: "True Believers"
1993	Berlin '39	Hans	
1993	Message from Nam	Dr. George Andrews	TV movie
1994	On Trial	Himself	Documentary
1994	Oldest Living Confederate Widow Tells All	Ned	TV movie
1994	Empty Nest	Agent #1	Episode: "Mrs. Clinton Comes to Town"
1994	Amberwaves	Dean Deamon	
1994–97	Star Trek: Deep Space Nine	Lt. Commander Michael Eddington	9 episodes
1993, 1997	Silk Stalkings	Bill Marshall, Egan / Babalocia	2 episodes
2000	Dov'è mio figlio	Cameron Ellis	TV movie
2001	JAG	Capt. O'Bryan	Episode: "Liberty"
2001	Shaka Zulu: The Citadel	Henry Francis Fynn	TV movie
2003	The District	Bartender	2 episodes

=== Theatre ===
Year	Title	Role	Notes
1974	Pericles	2nd Pirate/Lord	Delacorte Theater
1975	Hamlet	Stagehand	Delacorte Theater
1977	Shenandoah	Sam	Tour
1979	West Side Story	Tony	Miami, Florida
1980	West Side Story	Tony	Broadway
1986–87	Into the Woods	Cinderella’s Prince	Premiere at The Old Globe Theatre
