= List of Star Trek: Deep Space Nine home video releases =

The entire series of Star Trek: Deep Space Nine was released on Region 1 and Region 2 DVD in 2003. In Region 4, it was released on DVD between May 2003 and May 2004. Slimpack versions (like those released in 2006 for Star Trek: The Next Generation) were released in Region 2 areas on April 30, 2007. An entire series boxed set was released in Region 4 on August 6, 2009.

== Box sets ==
These are box sets, featuring entire seasons, that have been released on Region 1 (North America) and Region 2 (Europe).

=== The Complete First Season ===
This is the first Deep Space Nine box set, released on February 25, 2003 on Region 1, March 24, 2003 on Region 2, and May 9, 2003 on Region 4.

==== Episodes ====
Disc 1:

- "Emissary"
- "Past Prologue"
- "A Man Alone"

Disc 2:

- "Babel"
- "Captive Pursuit"
- "Q-Less"
- "Dax"

Disc 3:

- "The Passenger"
- "Move Along Home"
- "The Nagus"
- "Vortex"

Disc 4:

- "Battle Lines"
- "The Storyteller"
- "Progress"
- "If Wishes Were Horses"

Disc 5:

- "The Forsaken"
- "Dramatis Personae"
- "Duet"
- "In the Hands of the Prophets"

Disc 6:

- Special Features

==== Special Features ====
- Deep Space Nine: A Bold New Beginning
- Crew Dossier: Kira Nerys
- Michael Westmore's Aliens: Season One
- Secrets of Quark's Bar
- Alien Artifacts: Season One
- Deep Space Nine Sketchbook
- Original Deep Space Nine preview
- Photo gallery

=== The Complete Second Season ===
This is the second Deep Space Nine box set, released on April 1, 2003 on Region 1, April 28, 2003 on Region 2, and July 3, 2003 on Region 4.

==== Episodes ====
Disc 1:

- "The Homecoming"
- "The Circle"
- "The Siege"
- "Invasive Procedures"

Disc 2:

- "Cardassians"
- "Melora"
- "Rules of Acquisition"
- "Necessary Evil"

Disc 3:

- "Second Sight"
- "Sanctuary"
- "Rivals"
- "The Alternate"

Disc 4:

- "Armageddon Game"
- "Whispers"
- "Paradise"
- "Shadowplay"

Disc 5:

- "Playing God"
- "Profit and Loss"
- "Blood Oath"
- "The Maquis"

Disc 6:

- "The Maquis (Part II)"
- "The Wire"
- "Crossover"
- "The Collaborator"

Disc 7:

- "Tribunal"
- "The Jem'Hadar"
- Special features

==== Special Features ====
- New Frontiers: The Story Of Deep Space Nine
- Michael Westmore's Aliens: Season Two
- Deep Space Nine Sketchbook: Season Two
- Crew Dossier: Jadzia Dax
- New Station, New Ships
- Quark's Story
- Photo Gallery

=== The Complete Third Season ===
This is the third Deep Space Nine box set, released on June 3, 2003 on Region 1, June 23, 2003 on Region 2, and September 4, 2003 on Region 4.

==== Episodes ====
Disc 1:

- "The Search"
- "The Search, Part II"
- "The House of Quark"
- "Equilibrium"

Disc 2:

- "Second Skin"
- "The Abandoned"
- "Civil Defense"
- "Meridian"

Disc 3:

- "Defiant"
- "Fascination"
- "Past Tense, Part I"
- "Past Tense, Part II"

Disc 4:

- "Life Support"
- "Heart of Stone"
- "Destiny"
- "Prophet Motive"

Disc 5:

- "Visionary"
- "Distant Voices"
- "Through the Looking Glass"
- "Improbable Cause"

Disc 6:

- "The Die is Cast"
- "Explorers"
- "Family Business"
- "Shakaar"

Disc 7:

- "Facets"
- "The Adversary"
- Special features

==== Special Features ====
- The Birth of the Dominion and Beyond
- Crew Dossier: Odo
- U.S.S. Defiant
- Time Travel Files: "Past Tense"
- Sailing Through the Stars: A Special Look at "Explorers"
- Michael Westmore's Aliens, Season Three

=== The Complete Fourth Season ===
This is the fourth Deep Space Nine box set, released on August 5, 2003 on Region 1, August 25, 2003 on Region 2, and November 12, 2003 on Region 4.

==== Episodes ====
Disc 1:

- "The Way of the Warrior"
- "The Visitor"
- "Hippocratic Oath"

Disc 2:

- "Indiscretion"
- "Rejoined"
- "Starship Down"
- "Little Green Men"

Disc 3:

- "The Sword of Kahless"
- "Our Man Bashir"
- "Homefront"
- "Paradise Lost"

Disc 4:

- "Crossfire"
- "Return to Grace"
- "Sons of Mogh"
- "Bar Association"

Disc 5:

- "Accession"
- "Rules of Engagement"
- "Hard Time"
- "Shattered Mirror"

Disc 6:

- "The Muse"
- "For the Cause"
- "To the Death"
- "The Quickening"

Disc 7:

- "Body Parts"
- "Broken Link"
- Special features

==== Special Features ====
- Charting New Territory: Deep Space Nine Season Four
- Crew Dossier: Worf
- Michael Westmore's Aliens, Season Four
- Deep Space Nine Sketchbook
- Robert Blackman's Designs of the Future
- Jim Martin's Sketchbook
- Deep Space Nine Chronicles
- Photo Gallery

=== The Complete Fifth Season ===
This is the fifth Deep Space Nine box set, released on October 7, 2003 on Region 1, October 27, 2003 on Region 2, and January 15, 2004 on Region 4.

==== Episodes ====
Disc 1:

- "Apocalypse Rising"
- "The Ship"
- "Looking for par'Mach in All the Wrong Places"
- "...Nor the Battle to the Strong"

Disc 2:

- "The Assignment"
- "Trials and Tribble-ations"
- "Let He Who Is Without Sin..."
- "Things Past"

Disc 3:

- "The Ascent"
- "Rapture"
- "The Darkness and the Light"
- "The Begotten"

Disc 4:

- "For the Uniform"
- "In Purgatory's Shadow"
- "By Inferno's Light"
- "Doctor Bashir, I Presume?"

Disc 5:

- "A Simple Investigation"
- "Business as Usual"
- "Ties of Blood and Water"
- "Ferengi Love Songs"

Disc 6:

- "Soldiers of the Empire"
- "Children of Time"
- "Blaze of Glory"
- "Empok Nor"

Disc 7:

- "In the Cards"
- "Call to Arms"
- Special features

==== Special Features ====
- Trials and Tribble-ations: Uniting Two Legends
- Trials and Tribble-ations: A Historic Endeavor
- Crew Dossier: Miles O'Brien
- Inside DS9 with Michael Okuda
- Michael Westmore's Aliens: Season 5
- Deep Space Nine Sketchbook
- The Ferengi Culture
- Photo Gallery

=== The Complete Sixth Season ===
This is the sixth Deep Space Nine box set, released on November 4, 2003 on Region 1, December 8, 2003 on Region 2, and March 4, 2004 on Region 4.

==== Episodes ====
Disc 1:

- "A Time to Stand"
- "Rocks and Shoals"
- "Sons and Daughters"
- "Behind the Lines"

Disc 2:

- "Favor the Bold"
- "Sacrifice of Angels"
- "You Are Cordially Invited"
- "Resurrection"

Disc 3:

- "Statistical Probabilities"
- "The Magnificent Ferengi"
- "Waltz"
- "Who Mourns for Morn?"

Disc 4:

- "Far Beyond the Stars"
- "One Little Ship"
- "Honor Among Thieves"
- "Change of Heart"

Disc 5:

- "Wrongs Darker than Death or Night"
- "Inquisition"
- "In the Pale Moonlight"
- "His Way"

Disc 6:

- "The Reckoning"
- "Valiant"
- "Profit and Lace"
- "Time's Orphan"

Disc 7:

- "The Sound of Her Voice"
- "Tears of the Prophets"
- Special features

==== Special Features ====
- Mission Inquiry: "Far Beyond the Stars"
- 24th century wedding
- Crew Dossier: Julian Bashir
- Crew Dossier: Quark
- Deep Space Nine Sketchbook
- Gary Hutzel on "One Little Ship"
- Ferengi Rules of Acquisition: The Beginning
- Ferengi Rules of Acquisition: The Sequel
- Photo Gallery

=== The Complete Seventh Season ===
This is the seventh and final Deep Space Nine box set, released on December 2, 2003 on Region 1, December 22, 2003 on Region 2, and May 6, 2004 on Region 4.

==== Episodes ====
Disc 1:

- "Image in the Sand"
- "Shadows and Symbols"
- "Afterimage"
- "Take Me Out to the Holosuite"

Disc 2:

- "Chrysalis"
- "Treachery, Faith, and the Great River"
- "Once More Unto the Breach"
- "The Siege of AR-558"

Disc 3:

- "Covenant"
- "It's Only a Paper Moon"
- "Prodigal Daughter"
- "The Emperor's New Cloak"

Disc 4:

- "Field of Fire"
- "Chimera"
- "Badda-Bing Badda-Bang"
- "Inter Arma Enim Silent Leges"

Disc 5:

- "Penumbra"
- "'Til Death Do Us Part"
- "Strange Bedfellows"
- "The Changing Face of Evil"

Disc 6:

- "When It Rains…"
- "Tacking Into the Wind"
- "Extreme Measures"
- "The Dogs of War"

Disc 7:

- "What You Leave Behind"
- Special features

==== Special Features ====
- Ending An Era
- The Last Goodbyes
- Crew Dossier: Benjamin Sisko
- Crew Dossier: Jake Sisko
- Special Crew Dossier: Ezri Dax
- Morn Speaks
- Deep Space Nine Sketchbook
- Photo Gallery

== Easter eggs ==
All of the box sets feature easy to find easter eggs. They include interviews with cast members, guest stars and production staff. They are known as "Section 31 files".

== Fan Collectives ==
Several Deep Space Nine episodes feature in the 2006 Star Trek Fan Collective DVDs.

=== Time Travel DVD ===
- "Little Green Men" (with text commentary)
- "Trials and Tribble-ations"

=== Q DVD ===
- "Q-Less" (with text commentary)

=== Klingon DVD ===
- "The Way of the Warrior"
- "The Sword of Kahless"
- "Trials and Tribble-ations"

=== Captain's Log DVD ===
- "Far Beyond the Stars"
- "What You Leave Behind"
- "In the Pale Moonlight"

=== Alternate Realities DVD ===
- "Crossover"
- "Through the Looking Glass"
- "Shattered Mirror"

Participants were also allowed to vote for any of the seven hundred plus Star Trek episodes for inclusion on the DVD. The focus was on episodes such as "Far Beyond the Stars".
