= The Visitor (Star Trek: Deep Space Nine) =

- Star Trek: Deep Space Nine episode
- Episode no.: Season 4 Episode 2
- Directed by: David Livingston
- Written by: Michael Taylor
- Cinematography by: Jonathan West
- Production code: 476
- Original air date: October 9, 1995

Guest appearances
- Tony Todd as Adult Jake; Aron Eisenberg as Nog; Galyn Görg as Korena; Rachel Robinson as Melanie

Episode chronology
← Previous "The Way of the Warrior"	Next → "Hippocratic Oath"
- Star Trek: Deep Space Nine season 4

"The Visitor" is the 75th episode of the American syndicated science fiction television series Star Trek: Deep Space Nine and the second episode of the fourth season. The episode was written by Michael Taylor and directed by David Livingston. It originally aired on October 9, 1995.

Set in the 24th century, the series follows the adventures on Deep Space Nine, a space station located near a stable wormhole between the Alpha and Gamma quadrants of the Milky Way Galaxy. In this episode, an accident leaves Captain Benjamin Sisko frozen in time, leaving his son Jake with a lifelong obsession with rescuing his father, having his resolve tested when they briefly reunite every few decades.

The episode was nominated for a Hugo Award for Best Dramatic Presentation in 1996, but lost to Babylon 5's "The Coming of Shadows". It consistently ranks in polls as one of the most popular episodes of the entire series, often vying for first place with "In the Pale Moonlight" and "Trials and Tribble-ations", with one critic writing that the episode "sums up everything that made DS9 so unforgettable."

== Plot ==
The elderly Jake Sisko (Tony Todd) is visited by Melanie (Rachel Robinson), an aspiring writer, who is curious to learn why Jake gave up writing. Jake tells her his story, revealed as flashbacks in the episode.

When Jake was eighteen, his father Captain Benjamin Sisko took him on the USS Defiant to observe an inversion of the Bajoran Wormhole. The inversion causes a malfunction in the Defiant's warp drive; a bolt of energy strikes Benjamin, causing him to vanish into subspace. Believing him dead, Jake and the crew of Deep Space Nine mourn him; but a few months later, Jake catches sight of his father for a brief moment. A year after the incident, Benjamin appears again, but the crew is unable to return him to the normal flow of time.

When the Klingon Empire assumes control of Deep Space Nine, Jake returns to Earth. He eventually achieves success as an author, marries and settles down. When his father appears again, Jake introduces him to his wife and shows him the books he's published. He apologizes for moving on with his life instead of attempting to save his father, but Benjamin is proud of his son's accomplishments. When Benjamin disappears again, Jake decides to help him; he returns to school to study subspace mechanics, abandoning his writing career and marriage.

Decades later, the wormhole is to undergo another inversion, and Jake attempts to recreate the accident on the Defiant. The attempt briefly sends him into subspace with his father. During this "visit", Benjamin is disappointed that Jake has abandoned his writing and marriage in order to save him, and begs him to return to his true passions and live out his life for his own sake. Jake returns without his father and tries to determine what went wrong with the rescue attempt. But eventually he honors his father's request to rebuild his life by returning to writing.

On the night of Melanie's visit, Jake knows his father will appear again. He has injected himself with a lethal hypospray dose, believing that, by dying when his father is present, it will allow Benjamin to return to a time before the warp core incident. The next morning, Benjamin appears as expected, and Jake tells him that his death will give them both a "second chance". Jake dies in his father's arms; Benjamin finds himself back on the Defiant, and dodges the energy discharge. Confused, young Jake asks what happened. Benjamin tearfully responds, "I guess we were just lucky this time."

== Production ==
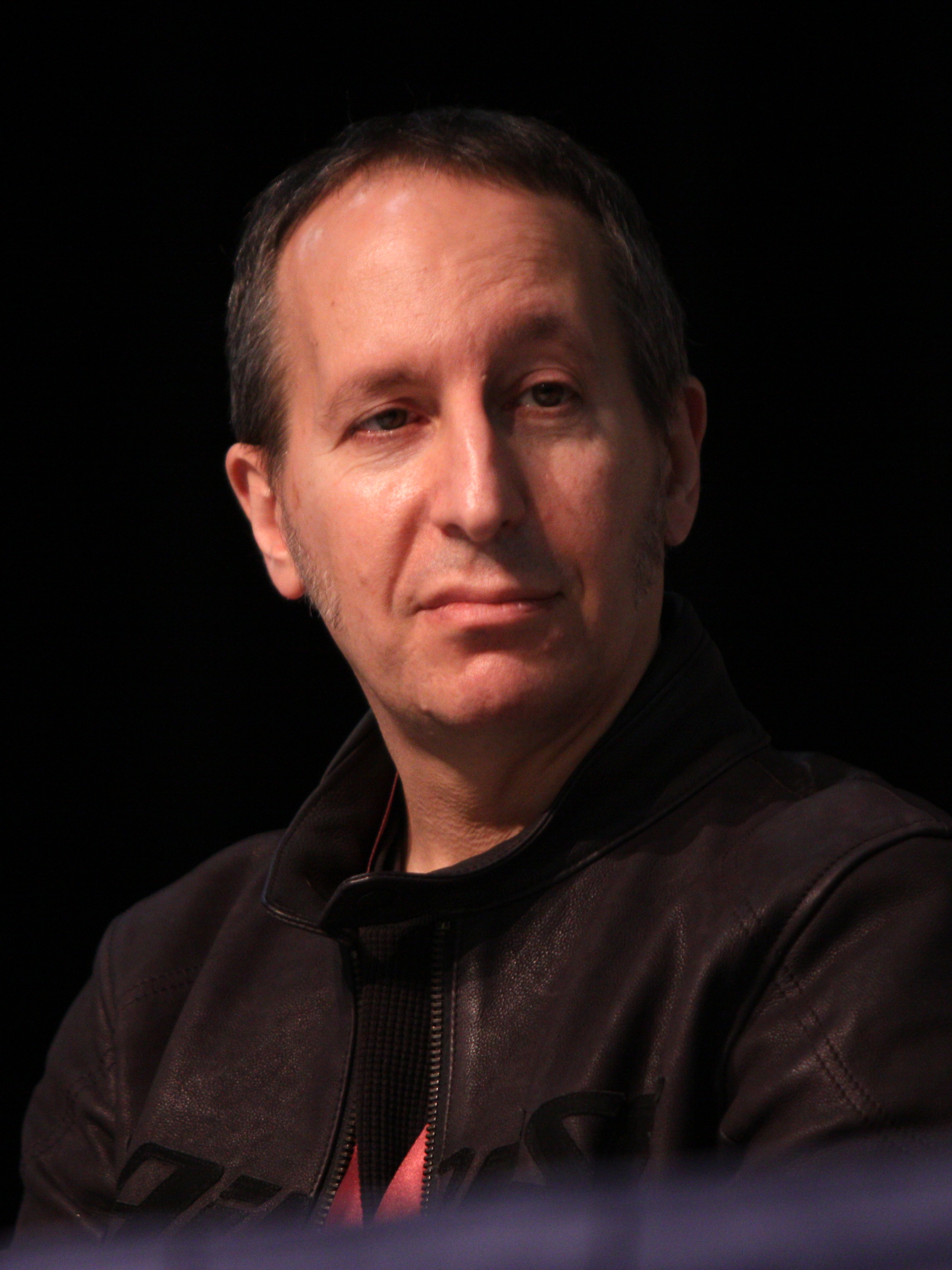
The episode was written by newcomer Michael Taylor

The script was written by Michael Taylor, who would later join the writing staff until Star Trek: Deep Space Nine's conclusion; once finished, he moved on to help write Star Trek: Voyager during its final three seasons. He also co-wrote "In the Pale Moonlight", another critically acclaimed episode of Deep Space Nine. Showrunner Ira Steven Behr noted that the everlasting love in the episode was not a romance, but something altogether more relatable: the devotion of a son to his father.

The episode was directed by David Livingston, a prolific director of Star Trek franchise episodes in the 1990s and 2000s.

Although the episode was always intended to be the second episode of the season, it was filmed third; "Hippocratic Oath" was filmed prior to accommodate Colm Meaney's (Miles O'Brien) schedule on a film. Tony Todd, who guest stars as adult Jake Sisko in this episode, also portrays Worf's brother Kurn in his other appearances in Star Trek: The Next Generation and Star Trek: Deep Space Nine. Melanie, the aspiring writer who listens to Jake's story, is played by Rachel Robinson, daughter of actor Andrew Robinson (Garak). Rachel Robinson also later auditioned for the role of Ezri Dax.

The future Starfleet uniforms and combadges were the same as those seen in the alternate future parts of the Star Trek: The Next Generation series finale "All Good Things...".

Jake starts writing the novel Anslem in the later season 4 episode "The Muse", and was accepted into the Pennington School in a previous season 3 episode "Explorers".

== Reception ==
=== Broadcast ===
"The Visitor" was first shown on October 9, 1995, in broadcast syndication. It was the second episode of the fourth season and received Nielsen ratings of 6.9 percent on the first broadcast.

=== Critical reception ===
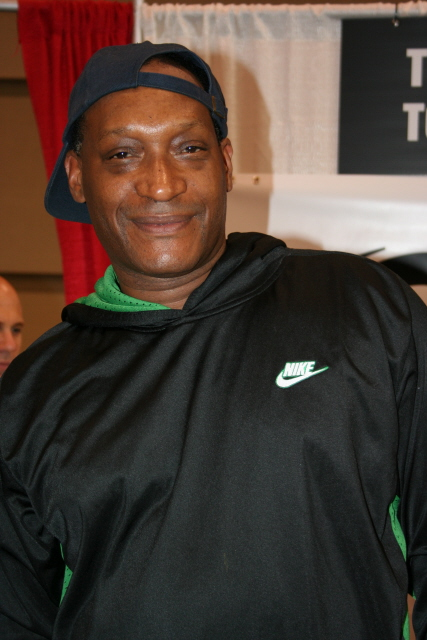
Tony Todd was praised for his performance as the adult Jake Sisko

Writing for Tor.com, Keith DeCandido felt that the episode was among the ten best Star Trek stories and praised the acting of Avery Brooks (Benjamin Sisko), Cirroc Lofton (Jake Sisko), and particularly Tony Todd (adult Jake Sisko). He felt that "Everyone who gets substantive screen time puts in a great performance here", also commending Terry Farrell (Jadzia Dax), Alexander Siddig (Julian Bashir), and Aron Eisenberg (Nog). DeCandido summarized his thoughts on the episode by writing, "Just a great great hour of television. One of the finest there has ever been", and awarded the episode a rating of ten out of ten. Jamahl Epsicokhan of Jammer's Reviews gave the episode 4/4 stars. He felt "The Visitor" was a "moving, thematic tale [that] is one of the most brilliantly realized character pieces I've seen on television." He lauded Michael Taylor's story, David Livingston's direction, the editing and the music. Ending his review, Epsicokhan wrote: "Even if you're grabbing the tissues by the end of this episode (I was) there is no way you can call this story maudlin or melodramatic. It's completely absorbing from the first frame to the last; definitely one of DS9's finest moments. There is true magic working here." The A.V. Club's Zack Handlen reviewed the episode standalone rather than alongside another episode – he had done so similarly in his review for "Duet" – and interspersed his review with memories with his own father. Handlen explained that he was reduced to tears when old Jake woke up to find his father watching him and smiling towards the end of the episode.

Analyzing Star Trek: Deep Space Nine's representation of black fatherhood in America through the characters of Benjamin and Jake Sisko, Vulture's Angelica Jade Bastién wrote how the "beauty of [their] relationship is perhaps never better portrayed than in the season-four episode "The Visitor." [...] Seeing black men cry, grapple with the historical importance of their existence, and remain beautifully, dynamically human is something no other science-fiction series on television has done with such panache." In 2018, the website had rated "The Visitor" the second-best episode of Star Trek: Deep Space Nine.

"The Visitor" was nominated for a Hugo Award for Best Dramatic Presentation in 1996, although Babylon 5's "The Coming of Shadows" won; reviewer Keith DeCandido wrote that he was present at the Hugo Awards in Los Angeles at the time and noted that the clip they showed for the episode cut off before the emotional scene between Captain Sisko and his son – while he liked Babylon 5's "The Coming of Shadows", he felt that this episode was "seriously robbed". It was ranked as the tenth best Star Trek episode for TV Guide's celebration of the franchise's 30th anniversary.

It has consistently ranked in polls as one of the most popular episodes of the entire series. About.com's Nigel Mitchell ranks it at third place (between "In the Pale Moonlight" and "Duet"). Den of Geek's Gem Wheeler considered the episode the best of the series and thought that if one was only going to watch one episode of Deep Space Nine, then this episode should be it, writing, "quite simply, one of the finest hours of Star Trek ever made." In a poll conducted on the official Star Trek website to determine the best episode of Deep Space Nine, "Trials and Tribble-ations" won, leaving the staff to ponder why "remarkable episodes as "The Visitor," "What You Leave Behind," "Duet" and "Far Beyond the Stars"" didn't receive the necessary votes to challenge the winner in earlier rounds.

"The Visitor" has been rated as one of the best Star Trek episodes in the franchise: IGN ranked it the 15th best episode of all Star Trek series; Radio Times ranked it the seventh best episode of Star Trek for those unfamiliar with the franchise; CBR ranked it the sixth best time-travel episode of all of Star Trek; and a binge-watching guide for Star Trek: Deep Space Nine by Wired recommended not skipping this "essential" episode. SyFy said "The Visitor" was "one of most powerful" episodes of the Star Trek franchise, praising it for perfect acting and powerful script. UK science fiction magazine and website SciFiNow ranked this one of the top ten episodes of Star Trek: Deep Space Nine, commenting "Not a dry eye in the house". James Whitbrook of Io9 said this was one of the "must watch" episodes from the series, remarking "be ready to cry".

== Releases ==
On August 5, 1998, "The Visitor" was released on LaserDisc format in Japan, as part of the 4th Season Vol. 1 box set.
