= Hippocratic Oath (Star Trek: Deep Space Nine) =

4th episode of the 4th season of Star Trek: Deep Space Nine

- Star Trek: Deep Space Nine episode
- Episode no.: Season 4 Episode 4
- Directed by: René Auberjonois
- Story by: Nicholas Corea; Lisa Klink
- Teleplay by: Lisa Klink
- Cinematography by: Jonathan West
- Production code: 475
- Original air date: October 16, 1995

Guest appearances
- Scott MacDonald as Goran'Agar; Stephen Davies as Arak'Taral; Jeremy Roberts as Meso'Clan; Marshall Teague as Temo'Zuma; Roderick Garr as Regana Tosh

Episode chronology
← Previous "The Visitor"	Next → "Indiscretion"
- Star Trek: Deep Space Nine season 4

"Hippocratic Oath" is the 76th episode of the syndicated American science fiction television series Star Trek: Deep Space Nine. It is the fourth episode of the fourth season and is directed by castmember René Auberjonois (Constable Odo).

Set in the 24th century, the series follows the adventures on Deep Space Nine, a space station located near a stable wormhole between the Alpha and Gamma quadrants of the Milky Way Galaxy. The Gamma Quadrant is home to the Dominion, a hostile empire that maintains control through its genetically engineered soldiers, the Jem'Hadar. In this episode, which explores the interaction between medical ethics and the duty of a soldier, Dr. Julian Bashir and Chief Miles O'Brien are captured by rogue Jem'Hadar.

== Plot ==
Miles O'Brien (Colm Meaney) and Julian Bashir (Alexander Siddig) crash-land their runabout on a planet that is home to several rogue Jem'Hadar. Their leader, Goran'Agar (Scott MacDonald), takes the two captive and asks Bashir to help cure his men of their addiction to ketracel-white, the drug that makes them loyal to the Founders of the Dominion. Goran'Agar has not needed the drug since he was stranded on the planet four years prior; he has concluded that there must be some substance on the planet that cured him of his addiction.

Bashir and O'Brien devise a plan to escape, but O'Brien's makeshift weapon is discovered. However, Bashir notes that Goran'Agar shows unusual mercy, and his conversations seem to indicate independence of thought and character. He decides he wants to aid Goran'Agar and his men, but O'Brien is convinced the Jem'Hadar will always be brutal killers regardless of whether they are dependent on the drug or not. Bashir eventually orders O'Brien to help him develop a cure by retrieving a piece of equipment from the runabout.

At the runabout, O'Brien escapes his guard. Meanwhile, Bashir concludes that there is nothing special about the planet that cured Goran'Agar of his addiction; through some biological fluke, he was never addicted in the first place. O'Brien finds Bashir, and when Bashir refuses to leave with him, O'Brien sabotages his work. Goran'Agar confronts them, but his merciful ways have lost him the loyalty of his men, and with no hope of a cure, he finds he has no reason to kill O'Brien and Bashir. He leads them to their runabout and asks O'Brien, a former soldier, to explain to Bashir why he cannot abandon his men, even if they would kill him if he stayed. On their way back to Deep Space Nine, O'Brien tries to explain to Bashir that all his efforts were intended to save him.

Meanwhile, Lt. Commander Worf (Michael Dorn) acclimates to living on DS9 and no longer being Chief of Security. He finds Quark dealing with a smuggler, and, frustrated by Constable Odo's apparent refusal to arrest the two, confronts them himself. Odo appears and explains to Worf that he wanted the deal to go ahead so that he could track the smuggler and break down the entire smuggling ring, but Worf's interference has made that impossible. Captain Sisko explains to Worf that life on Deep Space Nine has many grey areas that will take some getting used to.

== Production ==
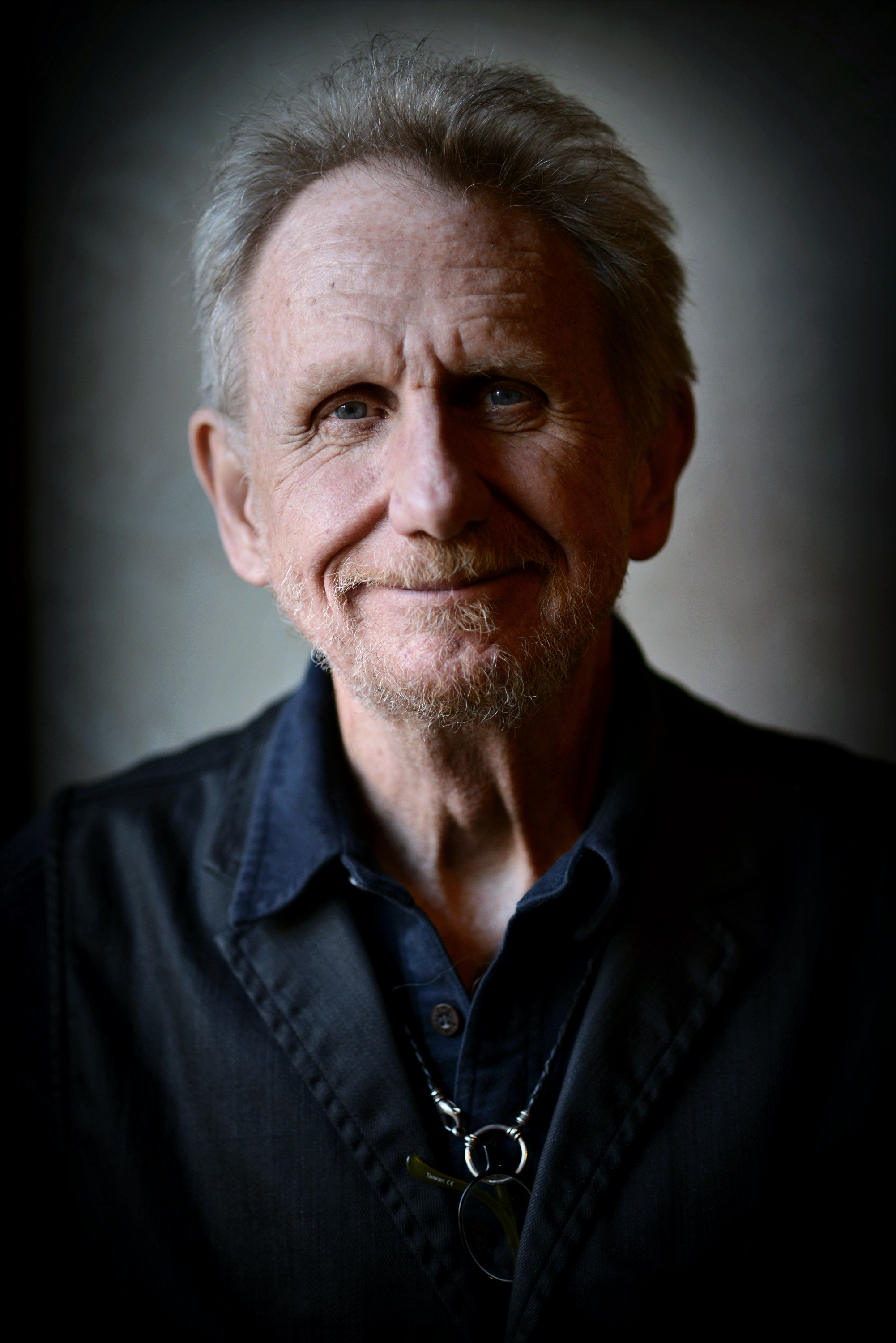
The episode was directed by René Auberjonois, who also played the character Odo

Lisa Klink wrote the first and second drafts, and then Ron Moore did an uncredited rewrite to polish the script and Klink was given full writing credit. Klink had made several unsuccessful attempts to pitch stories to the show, but was lucky enough to get a position as an intern on the writing staff after which she pitched another story. They liked the idea and made the sale but ultimately a brainstorming session changed it completely and since they had gotten to know her she was given the chance to write the script herself. She went on to work as a writer on Star Trek: Voyager.

== Reception ==
In a review in 2013 for The A.V. Club, Zack Handlen was happy with the use of Bashir and O'Brien to explore the moral difficulties of doing the right thing in difficult circumstances. He says of this episode, "This is what you call a back-to-basics hour, the sort of meat and potatoes entry..." and felt the B-plot with Worf adapting life on Deep Space Nine was straightforward. Tor.com rated it 8 out of 10.

Doux Reviews noted this for character studies of Bashir, O'Brien, and Worf negotiating the morally complexities of their situations, and gave it 5 out 6.

== Releases ==
On August 5, 1998, "Hippocratic Oath" was released on LaserDisc format in Japan, as part of the 4th Season vol.1 box set.

== Resources ==
- Star Trek: Deep Space Nine DVD set, volume 4, disc 1, selection 4

== See also ==
- Hippocratic Oath (A Medical oath)
