= Shadows and Symbols =

- Star Trek: Deep Space Nine episode
- Episode no.: Season 7 Episode 2
- Directed by: Allan Kroeker
- Written by: Ira Steven Behr; Hans Beimler
- Production code: 552
- Original air date: October 5, 1998

Guest appearances
- Jeffrey Combs as Weyoun; Casey Biggs as Damar / Dr Wykoff; Barry Jenner as Admiral Ross; J. G. Hertzler as General Martok; Deborah Lacey as Sarah Sisko; Megan Cole as Cretak; Brock Peters as Joseph Sisko

Episode chronology
← Previous "Image in the Sand"	Next → "Afterimage"
- Star Trek: Deep Space Nine season 7

"Shadows and Symbols" is the second episode of the seventh season of Star Trek: Deep Space Nine, the 152nd overall, premiering the week of October 5, 1998. The episode's premiere received Nielsen ratings of 4.2 points corresponding to over 4.1 million viewers. This episode was written by Ira Steven Behr and Hans Beimler, and directed by Allan Kroeker.

Set in the 24th century, the series follows the adventures of the crew of the Starfleet-managed Bajoran space station Deep Space Nine. The station is adjacent to a wormhole leading to the distant Gamma Quadrant; the wormhole is home to powerful alien beings worshiped by the Bajorans as the "Prophets", who have made station commander Benjamin Sisko their "Emissary". The later seasons of the series follow a war between the United Federation of Planets and the Dominion, an expansionist empire from the Gamma Quadrant. This episode resolves Sisko's crisis of faith in the wake of the events of the sixth-season finale, "Tears of the Prophets", and establishes the status quo for the remainder of the seventh season.

== Background ==
In "Tears of the Prophets", the Prophets came under attack by their ancient enemies, the Pah-wraiths, sealing the wormhole and incidentally killing Sisko's friend Jadzia Dax, who was a symbiotic relationship between the sluglike creature Dax and the humanoid Jadzia. The loss of the wormhole, combined with Jadzia's death, caused Sisko to experience a crisis of faith, leading him to take a leave of absence from Deep Space Nine and visit his father Joseph in New Orleans. While visiting his father in the preceding episode, "Image in the Sand", Sisko experienced visions convincing him that he must seek the mysterious "Orb of the Emissary" on the planet Tyree. Meanwhile, Colonel Kira Nerys, left in command on Deep Space Nine, came into conflict with the Romulans, powerful but untrustworthy allies of the United Federation of Planets, as they attempted to install weapons on the Bajoran moon of Derna; Jadzia's husband Worf planned a dangerous mission in order to secure a place for Jadzia in the Klingon afterlife, Sto-Vo-Kor; and the surviving Dax symbiont was transplanted into a new humanoid host, Ezri Dax, who arrived in New Orleans to visit Sisko.

The episode also returns to the scenario of the earlier episode "Far Beyond the Stars", in which Sisko imagined himself as Benny Russell, a science fiction writer in the 1950s.

== Plot ==
The Siskos are surprised by the young woman introducing herself as Ezri Dax, explaining she was the only unjoined Trill aboard the starship transporting the injured Dax symbiont back to Trill when it needed to be implanted immediately to survive. Benjamin Sisko invites Ezri to join him, his father Joseph, and his son Jake as they travel to Tyree to seek the Orb of the Emissary. Back on Deep Space Nine, Kira prepares a blockade to stop the Romulans from arming the weapons they have placed on Derna. Worf is joined by Jadzia's friends Miles O'Brien, Julian Bashir, and Quark on a mission led by the Klingon General Martok to destroy a Dominion shipyard in Jadzia's name.

The Siskos and Ezri arrive on Tyree. Guided by his visions, they begin a long trek across the desert. Eventually, Benjamin stops and digs on a seeming whim, while his father, son, and Ezri can only watch. He eventually unearths the Orb ark, but hesitates from opening it; he experiences visions of Benny Russell confined in a psychiatric hospital, as a doctor tries to persuade him to end the story of Benjamin Sisko. Sisko begins to bury the Orb, but Ezri convinces him that he should open it. When he does, an energy vortex is unleashed which re-opens the wormhole and expels the Pah-wraiths from it. Sisko experiences a vision in which one of the Prophets explains that she merged with Sisko's mother years ago to ensure Sisko's birth and the fulfillment of his destiny.

Against the advice of the Federation's Admiral Ross, Kira blockades Derna with old Bajoran ships, vastly outmatched by the firepower of the Romulans. Neither Kira nor the Romulans appear willing to back down, and seeing the wormhole reopen strengthens Kira's resolve. When he sees that Kira will not surrender, Ross persuades the Romulans to retreat.

On the Klingon ship, Worf is annoyed by the presence of O'Brien, Bashir, and Quark; eventually Martok reminds him to be grateful that Jadzia had such loyal friends, and he apologizes to them. When they reach the Dominion shipyard, they execute a plan to fly dangerously close to the sun and trigger a plasma ejection that will destroy the shipyard and illuminate the gates of Sto-vo-kor for Jadzia. The plan seems to fail when they are unable to trigger the plasma ejection, but they succeed on their second try and demolish the shipyard.

When Sisko returns to Deep Space Nine, the Bajoran people praise him for reopening the wormhole. His crew welcome him back, but are perplexed at the arrival of Ezri Dax.

== Production ==
Outdoor scenes in the desert landscape were filmed at sand dunes in Palmdale, California in the United States.

Guest stars include:

- Casey Biggs as Damar and Wykoff
- Megan Cole as Cretak
- Jeffrey Combs as Weyoun
- Deborah Lacey as Sarah
- J.G. Hertzler as Martok
- Barry Jenner as Admiral Ross
- Brock Peters as Joseph Sisko

Avery Brooks, in addition to Sisko, portrays Benny Russell, introduced in the season 6 episode "Far Beyond the Stars", a 20th-century writer of whose life Sisko has visions. The writing in Benny's cell in Sisko's vision consists of summaries of the first six seasons of Deep Space Nine.

== Bloopers ==
At around 43:05 in the episode, a figure’s head is briefly visible moving behind a rock outcropping in the background, behind Sisko on the right-hand side of the frame.

== Reception ==
In 2015, Geek.com recommended this episode as "essential watching" for their abbreviated Star Trek: Deep Space Nine binge-watching guide.

Keith R.A. DeCandido, reviewing the episode in 2014 for Tor.com, gave it a rating of six out of ten. He felt the episode was a strong follow-up to "Image in the Sand". He felt that the Kira and Worf plots were straightforward, and was happy to see the return of Benny Russell, but felt that the Prophets story was silly. However, he did feel it was a good introduction to Ezri Dax. Zack Handlen, reviewing the episode in the same year for The A.V. Club, also gave it a mixed review; he appreciated the relationship between the episode's three main plot lines and said that the characters' victories felt earned, but found the introduction of Ezri Dax awkward and disliked the focus on the Prophets and Pah-wraiths.

In 2020, Den of Geek listed the three-episode sequence from "Tears of the Prophets" to "Shadows and Symbols" as one of the best stories of Star Trek: Deep Space Nine.
