= Defiant (Star Trek: Deep Space Nine) =

- Star Trek: Deep Space Nine episode
- Episode no.: Season 3 Episode 9
- Directed by: Cliff Bole
- Written by: Ronald D. Moore
- Production code: 455
- Original air date: November 21, 1994

Guest appearances
- Jonathan Frakes as Thomas Riker; Shannon Cochran as Kalita; Marc Alaimo as Dukat; Tricia O'Neil as Korinas; Robert Kerbeck as Cardassian Soldier; Michael Canavan as Tamal

Episode chronology
← Previous "Meridian"	Next → "Fascination"
- Star Trek: Deep Space Nine season 3

"Defiant" is the 55th episode of the television series Star Trek: Deep Space Nine, the ninth episode of the third season. This episode guest stars actor Jonathan Frakes, in the role he had originated on Star Trek: The Next Generation, the predecessor series of Deep Space Nine's. The episode aired in broadcast syndication on November 21, 1994.

Set in the 24th century, the series follows the adventures on the Starfleet-run space station Deep Space Nine near the planet Bajor, as the Bajorans recover from a decades-long occupation by the imperialistic Cardassians. This episode explores the relationship between Cardassia and the United Federation of Planets, as well as the continuing conflict with the Maquis, a renegade group of Federation citizens who oppose the peace treaty between the Federation and Cardassia. In this episode, the Maquis steal the USS Defiant, a Starfleet warship docked at Deep Space Nine.

This episode was written by Ronald D. Moore and directed by Cliff Bole.

== Plot ==
William Riker arrives on Deep Space Nine and proceeds to charm the crew, especially Major Kira. She takes him on a tour of the station and its new ship, the Defiant. Once aboard, he draws a phaser and stuns her, fakes a warp-core breach and steals the ship with Kira aboard.

The station crew soon discovers that the thief is not Will Riker but his duplicate Thomas, who was created in a transporter accident and inadvertently stranded for eight years. Trying to distinguish himself from his more successful doppelgänger, he has joined the Maquis. The heavily armed Defiant under Maquis control now poses a serious threat to Cardassian forces. Commander Sisko is faced with the challenge of retrieving the Defiant intact while avoiding an incident with Cardassia that might start a war. He agrees to travel to Cardassia Prime to cooperate with a Cardassian operation led by Gul Dukat to hunt Riker down. The operation is observed by the Obsidian Order, the feared Cardassian intelligence agency.

After infiltrating Cardassian space and attacking an outpost, Riker takes the Defiant to the Orias system, which he believes contains a secret shipbuilding facility. When Sisko analyzes Riker's movements and realizes that his target is Orias, Dukat, believing the system to be barren and of no value, orders his ships to intercept. His Obsidian Order observer Korinas, however, warns him that any ship, Cardassian or otherwise, that approaches the system will be destroyed.

The Defiant manages to outrun its pursuers into the Orias system, but is confronted by several more Cardassian ships appearing from the system itself. Suspicious, Dukat confronts Korinas, inferring that the ships from the Orias system must belong to the Obsidian Order, who are strictly forbidden from possessing military equipment of any kind. With the Defiant trapped between the two fleets, Sisko arranges a deal with Dukat: In exchange for the Defiant's sensor logs of the system, which will provide evidence of the Obsidian Order's illegal military buildup, the Defiant will surrender to Dukat's lead ship and will be returned along with its crew to the Federation, and Riker will be sentenced to a Cardassian labor camp rather than to death. Kira persuades Riker to accept the terms. The opposing ships approach the Defiant and its Cardassian escorts, but abort the confrontation and return to the Orias system. Riker beams to the Cardassian ship, leaving Kira in control to return to Deep Space Nine.

== Connections to other episodes ==
Thomas Riker was first introduced in "Second Chances", an episode of Star Trek: The Next Generation.

The episode "The Die Is Cast", later in the third season of Deep Space Nine, reveals the purpose of the ships built by the Obsidian Order.

== Reception ==
In 2015, Geek.com recommended this episode as "essential watching" for their abbreviated Star Trek: Deep Space Nine binge-watching guide.

The series never followed up on what happened to Thomas Riker, and in 2020, Screen Rant described his fate as one of the top unresolved plot lines in the series.

In 2020, Den of Geek listed "Defiant" as one of the best stories of Star Trek: Deep Space Nine.

== Legacy ==
In the book Voyages of Imagination: The Star Trek Fiction Companion there is mention of a story called "Promises Made" that is about Kira rescuing Riker from a Cardassian prison camp. The story, Promises Made by David De Lee, appears in Strange New Worlds Book 8.

== Releases ==
On April 10, 1995, this episode and "Fascination" were released on VHS in the United Kingdom. On August 3, 1999, this pair of episodes were released on LaserDisc in the United States.

The episode was released on June 3, 2003 in North America as part of the Season 3 DVD box set. This episode was released in 2017 on DVD with the complete series box set, which had 176 episodes on 48 discs.
