= Al Rodrigo =

American character actor

- Born: New York City, U.S.
- Education: Syracuse University (BFA)
- Occupations: Actor; voice artist
- Years active: 1987–present

Al Rodrigo is an American character actor who has starred in theatre, films and on television since the 1980s.

== Early life and education ==
Rodrigo was born in New York City to Puerto Rican parents. He graduated from the High School of Performing Arts and received a BFA in theatre from Syracuse University.

== Career ==
Some of his film credits include Last Rites, The Glass Shield, Brown's Requiem, The Great White Hype, The Birdcage, and House of Sand and Fog, and others.

Rodrigo has made many guest appearances on TV shows, including Truth Be Told, Mayans MC, Martin, Something Wilder, SeaQuest DSV, Beverly Hills, 90210, ARLI$$, The West Wing, Wanted, High Incident, CSI: Miami, Days of Our Lives, and Supernatural. He also guest starred in Star Trek: Deep Space Nine in the season three two-part episode "Past Tense" as Bernardo Calvera, and numerous others.

He is the voice of Quinlan Vos in season three of Star Wars: The Clone Wars and the 2025 animated series Star Wars: Tales of the Underworld. Among some of his many voice over credits are the animated features Spider-Man: Into the Spider-Verse, Bilal: A New Breed of Hero, Penguins of Madagascar, Mr. Peabody and Sherman, Coco, and others. In video games he is the voice of Padre Sebastian and Gallo in Cyberpunk 2077, Chakravartin in Asura's Wrath, Oscar Diaz in Gears 5, Grand Theft Auto V, Uncharted 4: A Thief's End, Fallout 76, Army of Two: The Devil's Cartel, Tomb Raider, Call of Duty: Black Ops, and Dishonored, and others. He also does extensive work in the ADR community on numerous film and television projects.

== Filmography ==
=== Film ===
Year	Title	Role	Notes
1988	Last Rites	Luis De Vega	Credited as Al Rodriguez
1995	The Glass Shield	Rodrigo	
1996	The Birdcage	Latino Man in Club	
1996	The Great White Hype	Press Member #1	
1998	Brown's Requiem	Sandoval	
2000	Under Suspicion	Singer (voice)	
2001	Osmosis Jones	The Frank Police Department walkie talkie (voice)	
2003	House of Sand and Fog	Torez	
2008	Bachelor Party 2: The Last Temptation	Voice Actor (voice)	
2009	Scooby-Doo! The Mystery Begins	Ezekial Gallows (voice)	Television film
2010	Despicable Me	Chairs Usher (voice)	
2011	A Turtle's Tale: Sammy's Adventures	VW Driver (voice)	
2013	The Heat	Additional voices	
2014	Mr. Peabody & Sherman	Ajax (voice)	
2014	The Book of Life	Additional voices	
2014	Penguins of Madagascar	Penguin Fan (voice)	
2015	Bilal: A New Breed of Hero	Abu Al-Hakam (voice)	
2018	Spider-Man: Into the Spider-Verse	Additional voices	

=== Television ===
Year	Title	Role	Notes
1987	Leg Work	Joaquin	Episode: "The American Dream"
1991	Riders in the Sky	Senor Senor (1991)	2 episodes
1993	Nurses	Diego	Episode: "Bring Me, the Head of Hank Kaplan"
1993	Renegade	Angelo	Episode: "Endless Summer"
1994	seaQuest DSV	Commando	Episode: "Nothing But the Truth"
1995	Star Trek: Deep Space Nine	Bernardo Calvera	Episode: "Past Tense"
1995	Martin	Pico Rivera	Episode: "Swing Thing"
1996	Murder One	Newscaster	Episode: "Chapter Two, Year Two"
1997	The Nanny	Male Hostage	Episode: "The Bank Robbery"
1996–1997	Arliss	Client / Obless Obliche	2 episodes
1997	413 Hope St.	Job Counselor #3	Episode: "Pilot"
1998	Prey	Zendejas	Episode: "Origins"
1998	Beverly Hills, 90210	Detective Caliendo	2 episodes
1999	Charmed	Jaime	Episode: "Wicca Envy"
1998–1999	Air America	Fernando Guerrero	2 episodes
2000	JAG	Jason Kaplan	Episode: "Overdue & Presumed Lost"
2000	The West Wing	Commander Cale	Episode: "Shibboleth"
2002	Hidden Hills	Steve	Episode: "Pilot"
2002	NYPD Blue	Esteban Rojas	Episode: "One in the Nuts"
2003	CSI: Miami	State's Attorney Dante	Episode: "Bunk"
2005	Wanted	Hector Dunham	Episode: "The Promise of Darkness"
2010	Star Wars: The Clone Wars	Quinlan Vos (voice)	Episode: "Hunt for Ziro"
2013	Supernatural	Colonel the Dog (voice)	Episode: "Dog Dean Afternoon"
2016	Lastman	Additional Voices	Episode: "Action!"
2017	Trollhunters	Additional Voices	Episode: "Grand Theft Otto"
2020–2022	Star Trek: Lower Decks	Capitain Durango (voice)	2 episodes
2022–2023	DreamWorks Dragons: The Nine Realms	Ford (voice)	6 episodes
2025	Star Wars: Tales of the Underworld	Quinlan Vos (voice)	Episode: "A Way Forward"

=== Video games ===
Year	Title	Role	Notes
2012	Asura's Wrath	Chakravartin	English Dub
2012	Unit 13	Python	
2012	Dishonored	Slackjaw	
2012	Call of Duty: Black Ops II	Strike Force Soldier	
2013	Tomb Raider	Solarii	
2013	Army of Two: The Devil's Cartel	Cordova	
2013	Grand Theft Auto V	The Local Population	
2016	Uncharted 4: A Thief's End	Additional Voices	
2018	Fallout 76	Additional Voices	
2019	Gears 5	Oscar Diaz	
2020	Cyberpunk 2077	El Gallo, Gang, Sebastian	

=== Adr Loop Group ===
Year	Title	Notes
2002	Getting There	Direct-to-video
2002	Vampires: Los Muertos	Direct-to-video
2003	The Challenge	Direct-to-video
2003	Sinbad: Legend of the Seven Seas	
2004	Employee of the Month	
2004	Dawn of the Dead	
