= Fascination (Star Trek: Deep Space Nine) =

- Star Trek: Deep Space Nine episode
- Episode no.: Season 3 Episode 10
- Directed by: Avery Brooks
- Story by: Ira Steven Behr; James Crocker
- Teleplay by: Philip Lazebnik
- Production code: 456
- Original air date: November 28, 1994

Guest appearances
- Majel Barrett as Lwaxana Troi; Philip Anglim as Bareil; Rosalind Chao as Keiko

Episode chronology
← Previous "Defiant"	Next → "Past Tense, Part I"
- Star Trek: Deep Space Nine season 3

"Fascination" is the tenth episode of season three of Star Trek: Deep Space Nine, the 56th episode overall.

Set in the 24th century, the series follows the adventures of the crew of the space station Deep Space Nine near the planet Bajor. In this episode, residents of Deep Space Nine suddenly become infatuated with one another during a visit from ambassador Lwaxana Troi, played by guest star Majel Barrett. It is very loosely based on Shakespeare's A Midsummer Night's Dream.

The teleplay was written by Philip Lazebnik with a story by Ira Steven Behr and James Crocker; Avery Brooks directs and also plays as Sisko.

== Plot ==
The crew of Deep Space Nine is preparing for the Bajoran Gratitude Festival. As Major Kira is getting ready to perform the opening ceremony, she becomes distracted by the arrival of her boyfriend, Vedek Bareil. Meanwhile, Miles O'Brien welcomes his wife Keiko back to the station during a break from her research job on Bajor.

Lwaxana Troi arrives, and begins looking for Odo, claiming to have developed feelings for him since the last time she was aboard the station. As the festival gets underway, Lwaxana suffers strange headaches that come and go. Each time she experiences one, the people around her seem momentarily disoriented, and then experience lust for another co-worker, friend, or acquaintance. Those affected include Jake Sisko, who professes his love for Major Kira; Vedek Bareil, who pursues Jadzia Dax; and Dax herself attempts to seduce station commander Benjamin Sisko. Major Kira and Julian Bashir seem to be the only people who are affected in such a way that their lust is requited.

Meanwhile, Keiko tells Miles that her job on Bajor has been extended and will last another seven months. Miles asks her to stay on Deep Space Nine, regretting that he helped her find the job in the first place. Offended, Keiko storms away and returns to their quarters. Miles, contrite, follows her home; he apologizes and offers to resign his job if necessary and live with Keiko wherever she prefers. The two reconcile at a party hosted by Commander Sisko that evening.

At the party, Dax becomes annoyed that Bareil's attention is distracting her from her pursuit of Commander Sisko, and as a result, punches him. When Quark arrives with the catering and bumps into Lwaxana, who is having another headache, he is also affected, and grabs Keiko and insists that she be his love. Everyone then realizes that Lwaxana, a telepathic Betazoid, is affecting them somehow.

Bashir cures her Zanthi fever, an illness that makes her project her amorous impulses on the people surrounding her. He announces that everyone else should return to normal soon. Meanwhile, the two who belong together, the O'Briens, have made up and are enjoying each other's company again.

== Production ==
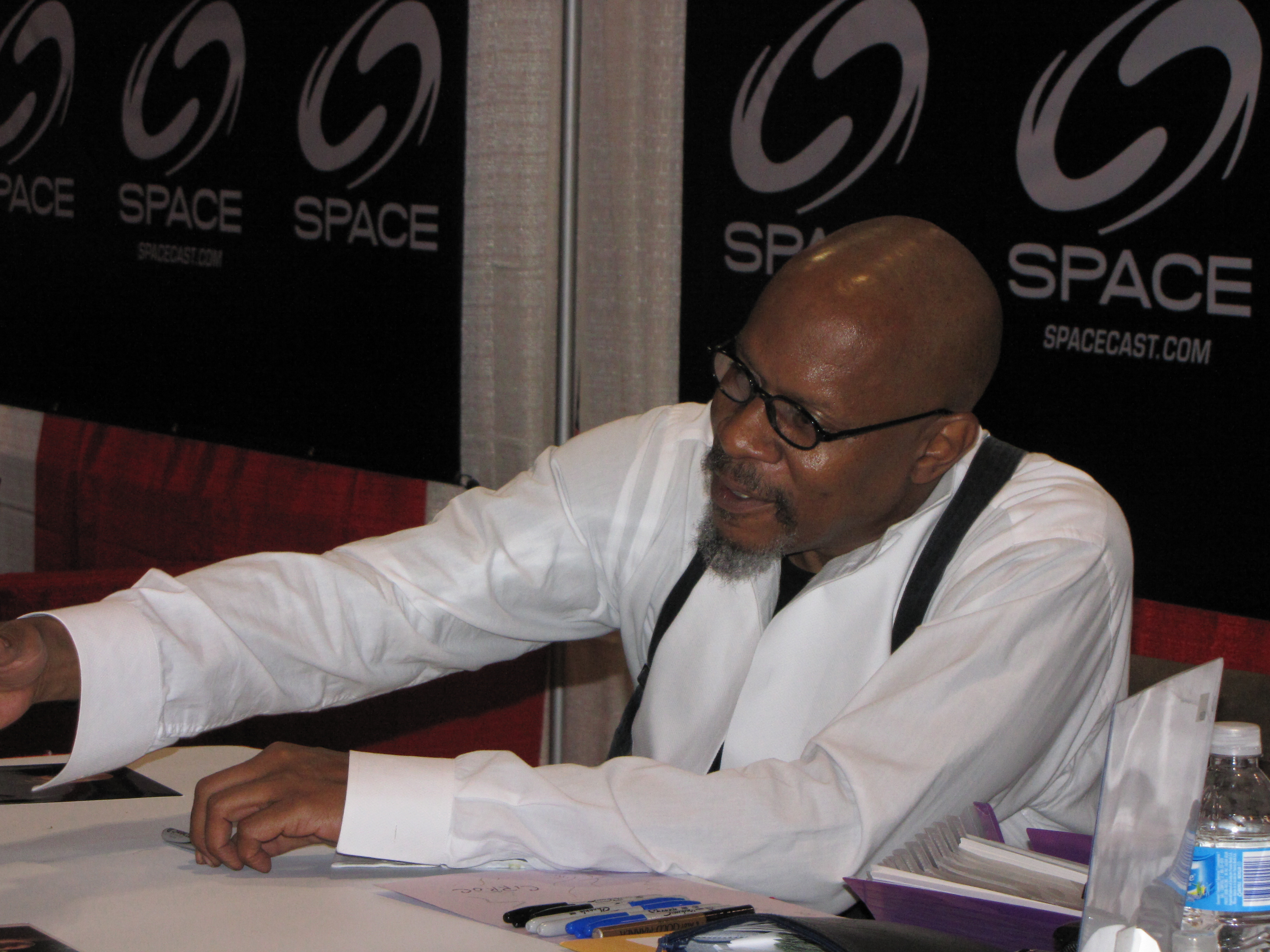
Brooks directs and plays Sisko

This episode was directed by Avery Brooks, who also played Sisko. The teleplay was written by Philip Lazebnik with a story by Ira Steven Behr and James Crocker.

The episode's story was inspired by Shakespeare's A Midsummer Night's Dream. The writing staff watched the 1935 film adaptation of A Midsummer Night's Dream to help prepare for this episode.

The episode features several recurring characters, including Majel Barrett as Lwaxana, Rosalind Chao as Keiko, and Philip Anglim as Bareil.

== Relationship to other episodes ==
This is the second of three meetings of Odo and Lwaxana Troi. She also visits in the episodes "The Forsaken" and "The Muse." The character Lwaxana Troi was previously introduced on the series Star Trek: The Next Generation (1987-1994), of which she appeared in six episodes, as the mother of that series's regular character Deanna Troi.

== Reception ==
In 2018, SyFy included this episode on their binge-watching guide focusing on the character Jadzia Dax.

In 2019, ScreenRant ranked this episode one of the ten worst episodes of Star Trek: Deep Space Nine.

In 2019, Tor.com noted this as "essential" for the character of Odo, remarking on the emotional vulnerability he displays in his interaction with Lwaxana. Keith R.A. DeCandido, reviewing the episode for Tor.com in 2013, gave it a rating of 3 out of 10, calling it "an awful episode".

== Releases ==
On August 3, 1999, this episode and "Defiant" were released on LaserDisc in the United States.

The episode was released on June 3, 2003 in North America as part of the season 3 DVD box set. This episode was released in 2017 on DVD with the complete series 48 disc box set, which had 176 episodes and extra featurettes.
