= One Little Ship =

- Star Trek: Deep Space Nine episode
- Episode no.: Season 6 Episode 14
- Directed by: Allan Kroeker
- Written by: David Weddle; Bradley Thompson
- Production code: 537
- Original air date: February 16, 1998

Guest appearances
- Aron Eisenberg as Nog; Scott Thompson Baker as First Kudak'Etan; Fritz Sperberg as Second Ixtana'Rax; Leland Crooke as Vorta; Christian Zimmerman as Third Lamat'Ukan

Episode chronology
← Previous "Far Beyond the Stars"	Next → "Honor Among Thieves"
- Star Trek: Deep Space Nine season 6

"One Little Ship" is the 138th episode of the television series Star Trek: Deep Space Nine. It is the 14th episode of the sixth season.

Set in the 24th century, the series follows the adventures of the crew of the fictional space station Deep Space Nine, which lies adjacent to a wormhole connecting the Alpha and Gamma Quadrants of the galaxy. The later seasons of the series follow a war against the Dominion, a hostile empire from the Gamma Quadrant. In this episode, a runabout carrying DS9 crew members Jadzia Dax, Miles O'Brien, and Julian Bashir is shrunk to a few centimeters long as a side effect of investigating a spatial anomaly. When the USS Defiant is boarded by the Dominion's genetically engineered Jem'Hadar soldiers, it is up to the shrunken officers to help retake the ship.

The episode received a Primetime Emmy Award nomination for Outstanding Special Visual Effects for a Series.

== Plot ==
The USS Defiant is sent on a mission to investigate a subspace anomaly. When Jadzia Dax, Miles O'Brien, and Julian Bashir take the runabout USS Rubicon into the anomaly, the entire runabout is shrunk to only several centimeters high, but the crew expects to return to normal once they exit.

While the runabout is in the anomaly, the Defiant is attacked by a Jem'Hadar ship, disabled, and boarded by Jem'Hadar soldiers. The Jem'Hadar commander, Kudak'Etan, proclaims the superiority of Jem'Hadar who were born in the Alpha Quadrant, and dismisses the advice of his more experienced, but Gamma Quadrant–born, second in command Ixtana'Rax. Since the Defiant's engines are damaged, Kudak'Etan demands that Captain Benjamin Sisko repair the ship's warp drive. Sisko claims he needs his crew's assistance to do so, and Kudak'Etan grants his request over Ixtana'Rax's objections.

Meanwhile, the Rubicon and its crew escape the anomaly and return to the Defiant, still miniaturized. They enter the ship through a plasma vent and make their way into the engine room, where they discover the Jem'Hadar takeover. The Rubicon crew observe Sisko executing his plan: while Major Kira repairs the warp drive (working slowly to stall for time), Sisko, Worf, and Nog are attempting to regain control of the ship. O'Brien observes that Nog is attempting to override the ship's security codes, and suggests that they take the Rubicon to the bridge to assist them. When Kudak'Etan enters, Sisko complains about Ixtana'Rax's interference, driving an additional wedge between the two. As the Jem'Hadar departs, the Rubicon follows him through the door.

On the bridge, O'Brien and Bashir beam into a computer node to manually bypass the command codes. They manage to reroute the circuitry, granting Sisko control of the ship. Sisko is unable to take advantage of it, however: Ixtana'Rax, having discovered that the warp drive repairs are complete, orders the Defiant crew away from the computer consoles. Kudak'Etan orders that the ship return to a Dominion outpost immediately, ignoring Ixtana'Rax's concerns about sabotage.

The Rubicon returns to engineering and attacks the Jem'Hadar, and it and the full-size crew are able to overcome them. After the Defiant is retaken, the Rubicon re-enters the anomaly and is returned to its normal size.

== Production ==
Screenwriter René Echevarria conceived the "little ship" idea for Star Trek: The Next Generation, Deep Space Nine's predecessor series, and finally got the go-ahead to write the episode late in DS9's run.

In this episode, special visuals were needed to show a runabout shrunk down to tiny size. Model designer Tony Meiniger built a new, 6-inch (150 mm)-long runabout model: although dialogue in the episode specified that the runabout had shrunk to 4 inches (100 mm), a model that small would have had problems with lighting and detail. The model was mounted on a specially built three-axis head, which allowed for easier miniature effect work than with the original filming model.
