= Julianna McCarthy =

American actress

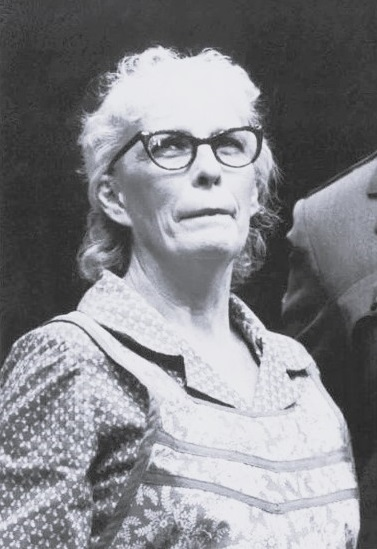
- McCarthy in 1987
- Occupation: Actress
- Years active: 1970–2014
- Known for: Original cast member, The Young and the Restless (as Liz Foster, 1973 to 1986)
- Spouse: Michael Constantine (m. 1953; div. 1972)
- Children: 2

Julianna McCarthy is an American actress.

== Biography and career ==
McCarthy began her career on the New York stage and appeared on Broadway in Inherit the Wind (1955–1957), alongside her husband, Michael Constantine. She and Constantine married on October 5, 1953; they had two children, Thea Eileen and Brendan Neil, before they divorced in 1972.

In 1986, she appeared on stage as the character Berte at the James A. Doolittle Theater in Hollywood, Los Angeles in the Mark Taper Forum production of Hedda Gabler, which was directed by Robert Egan. Starring Egan's then-wife, Kate Mulgrew, as Hedda, the production also included Linda Purl as Mrs. Elvsted.

McCarthy was an original cast member of the soap opera The Young and the Restless, starring as matriarch Liz Foster from 1973 to 1986. She reprised the role in 1993, 2003–2004, and 2008, returning for her most recent appearance in June 2010. While she was taken off of contract in late fall 1982 and didn't make appearances for months, she was brought back on a recurring basis in time for the show's tenth anniversary, appearing semi-regularly for the next couple of years until her character moved to London. She was seen semi-regularly during the show's 30th anniversary when an ailing Liz revealed that her daughter, Jill, had been adopted. Her storyline concerned Jill's determination to find her birth parents. The character of Liz died in June 2010 on-screen.

McCarthy has also appeared in motion pictures including The Last American Virgin, The Distinguished Gentleman, The Frighteners, Starship Troopers and Ted Bundy.

She had a recurring role as Mila in Star Trek: Deep Space Nine, appearing in the episodes "Improbable Cause", "The Dogs of War" and the final episode, "What You Leave Behind". McCarthy also had recurring roles in Paradise and the 1991 remake of Dark Shadows as Mrs. Johnson, the housekeeper. In the show's flashbacks, she played the role of the calculating Collins relative Abigail.

== Filmography ==
=== Film ===
Year	Title	Role	Notes
1980	Seed of Innocence	Sister Nadine	
1988	Bad Dreams	Nurse #1	
1989	Satan's Princess	Mrs. O'Hara	
1990	The First Power	Grandmother	
1993	Striking Distance	Helen Kramer	
1993	Lightning in a Bottle	Wilma	
1994	When the Bough Breaks	Mrs. Voss	
1996	The Frighteners	Old Lady Bradley	
2000	The Girls' Room	Nana	
2009	Herpes Boy	Grananna	
2011	Last Ride on the Midwest Pacific	Nan	
2014	Jack and Julianna	Julianna	Short film

=== Television ===
Year	Title	Role	Notes
1970	Ironside	Mary Dayton	Episode: "Tom Dayton Is Loose Among Us"
1973–86, 1993, 2003–04, 2008, 2010	The Young and the Restless	Elizabeth 'Liz' Foster Brooks	Recurring role
1981	Lou Grant	Augusta	Episode: "Search"
1981	A Gun in the House	Thelma Grine	TV film
1981	Hill Street Blues	Dr. Davis	Episode: "Up in Arms"
1986	The New Mike Hammer	Ruth Bailer	Episode: "Golden Lady"
1986	L.A. Law	Frances Clifford	Episode: "Slum Enchanted Evening"
1987	Stingray	Ruth Daniels	Episode: "Echoes"
1987	Cagney & Lacey	Annie	Episode: "Easy Does It"
1989	Highway to Heaven	Flo	Episode: "The Inner Limits"
1989, 1991	Jake and the Fatman	Vera Rose Delaney, Ida Houck	Episodes: "The Lady in Red", "I Could Write a Book"
1989–1990	Paradise	Margaret	Guest role (seasons 1–2)
1990	Mama's Family	Lucille	Episode: "Pinup Mama"
1990	Working Girl	Mrs. Perkins	Episode: "McJoe's"
1991	Dark Shadows	Abigail Collins	Main role
1991	Matlock	Lillian Abbot	Episode: "The Dame"
1993	Donato and Daughter	Adele Loring	TV film
1994, 2002	ER	Mrs. Raskin	Episodes: "24 Hours", "Orion in the Sky"
1995	A Bucket of Blood	Mrs. Swicker	TV film
1995	Land's End	Susanne Foster	Episode: "Parentnapping"
1995, 1999	Star Trek: Deep Space Nine	Mila	Episodes: "Improbable Cause", "The Dogs of War", "What You Leave Behind"
1996	The Client	Henrietta Gaines	Episode: "Sympathy for the Devil"
1996	Melrose Place	Mabel	Episode: "The Circle of Strife"
1997	The Sleepwalker Killing	Eileen Hunter	TV film
1998	The Magnificent Seven	Jessie	Episode: "Inmate 78"
1998	Poodle Springs	Mrs. D	TV film
1998	Profiler	Agnes McMillan	Episode: "Coronation"
2000	NYPD Blue	Mrs. Kenyon	Episode: "Who Murders Sleep"
2001	Once and Again	Nana	Episode: "The Other End of the Telescope"
2001	Touched by an Angel	Catherine Knight	Episode: "Holy of Holies"
2002	Six Feet Under	Beatrice	Episode: "Out, Out, Brief Candle"
2005	Mystery Woman: Mystery Weekend	Dorothy	TV film
2006	The Unit	Margaret	Episode: "Old Home Week"
2007	Shredderman Rules	Grandma	TV film
2007	Cold Case	Penny Centavo	Episode: "World's End"
2008	Jane Doe: Eye of the Beholder	Hildy Bloome	TV film
2010	NCIS: Los Angeles	Esther Balmore	Episode: "LD50"
