= Who Mourns for Morn? =

- Star Trek: Deep Space Nine episode
- Episode no.: Season 6 Episode 12
- Directed by: Victor Lobl
- Written by: Mark Gehred-O'Connell
- Production code: 536
- Original air date: February 2, 1998

Guest appearances
- Gregory Itzin as Hain; Brad Greenquist as Krit; Bridget Ann White as Larell; Cyril O'Reilly as Nahsk; Mark Allen Shepherd as Morn / Bajoran Officer

Episode chronology
← Previous "Waltz"	Next → "Far Beyond the Stars"
- Star Trek: Deep Space Nine season 6

"Who Mourns for Morn?" is the 136th episode of the television series Star Trek: Deep Space Nine, and the 12th episode of the sixth season.

Set in the 24th century, the series follows the adventures on the space station Deep Space Nine near the planet Bajor. This episode is centered on the character Quark, who manages a bar on Deep Space Nine, and the unexpected death of Morn, one of his regular customers.

== Plot ==
The shocking news arrives that Morn has been killed in an ion storm. Captain Sisko interrupts the memorial service to inform Quark that he has inherited Morn's entire estate, which proves to consist only of a shipment of spoiled produce, a tub of mud, and a painting.

Inspecting Morn's quarters, Quark finds a woman claiming to be Morn's ex-wife, Larell. She tells Quark that Morn had won 1,000 bricks of latinum — a valuable liquid pressed into gold to make it easier to handle — in a lottery. Quark offers Larell a 10% share, but is unable to find the money in Morn's quarters.

Quark is later confronted by two brothers, Krit and Nahsk. Claiming to be Morn's business associates, they tell Quark that Morn owes them all of the latinum. To intimidate him, Nahsk smashes Morn's painting over Quark's head when he tries to bargain with them. The brothers agree to take a 50% share and depart; once they are gone, Quark finds a storage locker claim slip hidden within the remains of the painting.

In the locker, Quark finds one brick of latinum inscribed with an account number for the Bank of Bolias. Larell steals the brick, but Quark has already memorized the number. He hurries back to his quarters to send for the balance, but another stranger, Hain, intercepts him and holds him at gunpoint. Claiming to be a security officer from Morn's home planet, Hain explains that Morn is a prince, and that his latinum is the property of the royal family. When he learns Larell is on the station, he offers Quark a reward for her capture.

Larell, Krit, Nahsk and Hain eventually all converge at Quark's quarters. Quark learns that their stories are lies, and that the money is from a bank robbery they and Morn committed nine years earlier. Morn had betrayed them and fled with the money, but now that the statute of limitations has expired, they have come to collect their shares without fear of prosecution. Quark persuades them to split the money five ways with him, since only he can take delivery of it as Morn's legal heir. Once it arrives, the four criminals turn against one another, each trying to claim it all. Quark runs for cover as a shootout ensues, and Constable Odo soon arrives to arrest the four. Excited at the prospect of being able to keep all the money, Quark examines the gold bricks but discovers that all the latinum has been extracted; the gold itself is worthless.

Resigned to his fate, Quark returns to the bar only to find Morn walking in and taking his usual seat. He had faked his own death, leaving Quark to get the others out of the way so he could keep all the latinum for himself. Revealing that he had swallowed the latinum in order to hide it in his second stomach, he regurgitates a small quantity into a glass (100 bricks' worth, by Quark's estimate) and gives it to Quark as a sign of gratitude.

== Production ==
Morn, played by Mark Allen Shepherd, is a recurring extra on the series; the character has no lines, but frequently appears sitting at Quark's bar. As an extra, Shepherd received no on-screen credit for the role. Morn's presentation as an alien involved Shepherd wearing a thick costume mask and suit; but in this episode, Shepherd also makes an appearance (still uncredited) as a Bajoran mourner at Morn’s memorial service who is invited to sit in Morn's chair, revealing the actor’s normal appearance.

== Reception ==
Keith R. A. DeCandido of Tor.com gave it four out of ten.
