= The Muse (Star Trek: Deep Space Nine) =

- Star Trek: Deep Space Nine episode
- Episode no.: Season 4 Episode 21
- Directed by: David Livingston
- Story by: René Echevarria; Majel Barrett
- Teleplay by: René Echevarria
- Production code: 493
- Original air date: April 29, 1996

Guest appearances
- Majel Barrett as Lwaxana Troi; Michael Ansara as Jeyal; Meg Foster as Onaya

Episode chronology
← Previous "Shattered Mirror"	Next → "For the Cause"
- Star Trek: Deep Space Nine season 4

"The Muse" is the 93rd episode of the television series Star Trek: Deep Space Nine, the 21st episode of the fourth season.

Set in the 24th century, the series follows the adventures on the space station Deep Space Nine. In this episode, budding writer Jake Sisko falls under the spell of a mysterious woman, while Constable Odo helps Ambassador Lwaxana Troi escape her controlling husband.

The episode marks the final appearance of the recurring character Lwaxana Troi. It also marks the final on-screen appearance of Majel Barrett Roddenberry in the Star Trek franchise, though she would continue to provide voiceover work for the franchise until her death in 2008.

== Plot ==
Lwaxana Troi returns to Deep Space Nine seeking Odo's protection. She is pregnant with a son and on the run from her Tavnian husband, Jeyal. He wants to take the baby, upon birth, away from Lwaxana to be raised in an all-male environment. Lwaxana does not want to be separated from her child.

Odo discovers that, according to the specific wording of Tavnian law, the son belongs to the mother's husband, not necessarily the actual father. He proposes that Lwaxana divorce Jeyal and marry Odo, so that Jeyal cannot claim her child. This scheme is complicated when Jeyal invites himself to the marriage ceremony. The Tavnian marriage ceremony requires that all present be convinced of the legitimacy of the feelings of the couple, meaning that Odo will have to convince Jeyal that he is truly in love with Lwaxana in order for the marriage to be legitimate. The plan works; Odo and Lwaxana are married and Jeyal leaves the station.

Meanwhile, Jake Sisko spots an alluring woman arriving on the station. She finds him and invites him to her quarters. Jake backs out of a 3-day trip with his father, Captain Benjamin Sisko, in order to stay on the station and meet with the woman, Onaya. That evening, Jake meets with her and she helps him write by stimulating certain areas of his brain. However, it appears she is also taking something away from Jake.

Jake meets with her several times working on an ambitious novel. His father returns to the station and eventually finds Jake with Onaya and prevents her from killing his son. Onaya justifies her actions by saying that she allows artists to "live forever" through brilliant work that she helps them produce, while she is nourished by the artists' brain energy. When Captain Sisko tries firing his phaser at her, she is unaffected and disappears from the station as a ball of energy.

While Jake is recovering, his father has read the pages that he wrote under the influence of Onaya, and tells Jake he has the beginnings of a good novel. Jake responds that he does not feel that the words were his own. Benjamin assures him that Onaya had only helped him draw out what was already there.

== Relation to other episodes ==
- This is the third of three meetings of Odo and Lwaxana Troi. She also visited in the episodes "The Forsaken" and "Fascination."
- The novel that Jake works on in this episode is titled Anslem. The earlier episode The Visitor portrayed an alternate future in which Jake became a successful writer as an adult after the disappearance of his father; and in that episode Anslem is the novel that propelled him to fame.

== Reception ==
In 2018, Comic Book Resources included "The Muse" on a list of Star Trek episodes that were "so bad they must be seen", calling it "one of the most disappointing episodes" of Deep Space Nine and a waste of Majel Barrett's final appearance. Keith DeCandido of Tor.com gave it four out of ten.

A 2015 binge-watching guide for Star Trek: Deep Space Nine by Wired recommended skipping this episode.

Director David Livingston conceded that of the episodes he directed this episode was not good.
