= Deborah Lacey =

American actress

Deborah Lacey is an American actress.

== Career ==
Lacey had a recurring role in the final season of Star Trek: Deep Space Nine as Sarah Sisko, the mother of Benjamin Sisko. More recently, Lacey had the recurring role of Carla in Mad Men. Lacey has made guest starring appearances in The A-Team, Highway to Heaven, Doogie Howser, M.D., Frasier, Sliders, Cybill, House and Bones.

== Filmography ==
=== Film ===
Year	Title	Role	Notes
1989	African Timber	Victoria St. George	
1991	The Five Heartbeats	Rose	
1991	A Demon in My View	Linthea	
1993	The Meteor Man	TV Housewife	
1994	Exit to Eden	Sophia	
1995	Devil in a Blue Dress	Sophie	
1996	Special Report: Journey to Mars	-	TV movie
1998	Bulworth	Reporter #2	
2000	$pent	Female Cop	
2005	The State of Grace	Grace	Short
2005	Chaos	Justine	
2013	Behind the Candleabra	Gladys - Liberace's Maid	
2015	Whitney	Award Presenter	TV movie
2015	Doors	Bernie Clemmons	Short
2015	Straight Outta Compton	Journalist	
2016	Love Under New Management: The Miki Howard Story	Tressie	
2017	Atone	Margaret	Short
2017	Acceptance	Mom	Short
2019	Hard to Place	Rhonda	Short
2019	Aloha	Camille's Mom	Short
2020	Common Decency	Therapist	Short

=== Television ===
Year	Title	Role	Notes
1979	The White Shadow	Janine/Nancy/Student	3 episodes
1984	The A-Team	Charlotte King	Episode: "The Bells of St. Mary's"
1985	Who's the Boss?	Desiree	Episode: "Paint Your Wagon"
1985	Highway to Heaven	Julie Reynolds	Episode: "As Difficult as ABC"
1986	The Hitchhiker	Tanya	Episode: "The Curse"
1987	Roxie	-	Episode: "You're a Big Girl Now"
1988	21 Jump Street	Lynette Johnson	Episode: "Chapel of Love"
1988	Duet	Joyce	Episode: "Mommy and Me"
1989	1st & Ten	Melissa	Episode: "Heaven Help Me"
1990	New Attitude	Leona	Episode: "The Case of the Missing Toupee"
1991	Home Improvement	Alice	Episode: "Off Sides"
1992	Doogie Howser, M.D.	Denise Caldwell	Episode: "If This Is Adulthood, I'd Rather Be in Philadelphia"
1993	Roc	Mrs. Emerson/Crystal	Episode: "Up in the Attic" & "Time to Move On"
1994	Me and the Boys	Carla	Episode: "We're Off to See the Lizard" & "Oops, There It Is!"
1995	Sliders	Sharon Brown	Episode: "Summer of Love"
1995	Vanishing Son	Marie	Episode: "Jersey Girl"
1995	Frasier	Customer	Episode: "The Innkeepers"
1995	Murder, She Wrote	Olivia Archer	Episode: "A Quaking in Aspen"
1995	The Preston Episodes	Mary Ann	Episode: "The Divorce Ceremony Episode"
1996	Beverly Hills, 90210	Receptionist	Episode: "You Say It's Your Birthday: Part 1"
1996	Moesha	Renee	Episode: "The Whistle Blower"
1997	Cybill	Clerk	Episode: "Mother's Day"
1997	Melrose Place	Matt's Attorney	Episode: "Who's Afraid of Amanda Woodward?: Part 1 & 2"
1997	Fame L.A.	Ellysa	Episode: "The Beat Goes On"
1997	L.A. Heat	Chanice Adams	Episode: "Words Will Never Hurt Me"
1998	Mike Hammer, Private Eye	Erin	Episode: "Dead Men Talk"
1998	Push	Ursula Wenden	Episode: "Walk It Off"
1998-99	Star Trek: Deep Space Nine	Sarah Sisko	Recurring cast: season 7
1999	L.A. Heat	Grace	Episode: "F Is for Framed"
1999	The Pretender	Andrea Blaine	Episode: "The World's Changing"
2000	Any Day Now	-	Episode: "Homegirl"
2000	ER	Det. Tincreed	Episode: "The Visit"
2001	Philly	Green's Bailiff	Episode: "Loving Sons"
2002	That's Life	Professor	Episode: "Gutterball"
2006	House	Lorraine	Episode: "Whac-A-Mole"
2007	Entourage	Rufus' Wife	Episode: "The Prince's Bride"
2007-10	Mad Men	Carla	Recurring cast: season 1-4
2009	Bones	Nurse	Episode: "The Critic in the Cabernet"
2009	The Closer	Mrs. Gray	Episode: "Half Load"
2010	Private Practice	Marsha	Episode: "Best Laid Plans"
2012	House	Lorraine	Episode: "Nobody's Fault"
2013-14	Hart of Dixie	Madame Van Horn	Guest: season 2, recurring cast: season 4
2014-15	The Fosters	Marie	Guest: season 1, recurring cast: season 2
2019-22	A House Divided	Auntie Mae	Recurring cast
