= The Search (Star Trek: Deep Space Nine) =

- Star Trek: Deep Space Nine episodes
- Episode nos.: Season 3 Episodes 1 and 2
- Directed by: Kim Friedman (Part I); Jonathan Frakes (Part II)
- Story by: Ira Steven Behr; Robert Hewitt Wolfe
- Teleplay by: Ronald D. Moore (Part I); Ira Steven Behr (Part II)
- Production codes: 447 and 448
- Original air dates: September 26, 1994; October 3, 1994

Guest appearances
- Martha Hackett as T'Rul; Salome Jens as Female Changeling; John Fleck as Ornithar; Kenneth Marshall as Michael Eddington; Andrew J. Robinson as Garak; Natalija Nogulich as Admiral Nechayev; William Frankfather as Male Changeling; Dennis Christopher as Borath; Tom Morga as Jem'Hadar Soldier; Diaunté as Jem'Hadar Guard; Christoper Doyle as Jem'Hadar Officer; Majel Barrett as Computer Voice

Episode chronology
← Previous "The Jem'Hadar"	Next → "The House of Quark"
- Star Trek: Deep Space Nine season 3

"The Search" is the 47th and 48th episode of the science fiction television show Star Trek: Deep Space Nine.

Set in the 24th century, the series follows the adventures on Deep Space Nine, a space station located near a stable wormhole between the Alpha and Gamma quadrants of the Milky Way Galaxy, near the planet Bajor. During this period, the station commander, Federation Commander Sisko, played by Avery Brooks, is trying to understand the nature of alien forces in the region.

It is a two-part episode, consisting of the first and second episodes of the third season. It has also been linked with the preceding episode "The Jem'Hadar", to essentially form a full three episode trilogy.

It marks the first appearance of the fictional spacecraft USS Defiant, which plays a large role throughout the rest of the series. It also marks the first appearance of the redesigned communicator badge after it was designed for Star Trek Generations.

== Plot ==
=== Part 1 ===
The previous episode marked the first occasion that anyone from the Alpha Quadrant had met the Jem'Hadar and lived to tell the tale, as the Dominion made a very blunt demonstration of both their abilities and their intentions - chiefly by destroying a Galaxy-class starship making its way out of the Gamma Quadrant.

This episode starts with Major Kira leading a discussion in Ops about how best to prepare, should the Dominion launch an attack through the wormhole. While the team comes to the depressing conclusion that Deep Space Nine could only hope to resist being taken over for at best two hours, an unusual starship decloaks three hundred meters from the docking ring. Commander Sisko has returned from Earth in the newly commissioned USS Defiant.

The Commander tells the crew all about the new ship in the conference room. An overpowered prototype originally designed to combat the Borg, the Defiant has been brought out of the warehouse and fitted with a Romulan cloaking device. Sisko introduces two new officers: a Romulan Sub-Commander, there to supervise the proper use of the cloaking device, and Lieutenant Commander Michael Eddington, from Starfleet Security. Odo is immediately suspicious of the high ranking security officer. As the briefing concludes he confronts Sisko and after an antagonistic conversation promises Sisko his resignation as Head of Station Security within the hour.

The command crew, including Doctor Bashir, Chief O'Brien and Lieutenant Dax, as well as Odo and Quark set out in the Defiant the next morning on a mission to find the Founders, leaders of the Dominion, to establish peaceful terms for the Federation's exploration of the Gamma Quadrant. During this mission, Odo develops an apparently inexplicable fascination with the Omarion Nebula. The crew are at first successful with the new cloaking device in evading Dominion patrols, although Jem'Hadar vessels seem capable of detecting something while the Defiant travels at warp speed.

The investigations of the crew lead them to an isolated and apparently undefended communications relay. Chief O'Brien and Lt. Dax are sent on an away mission to learn what they can from the relay's memory banks. As they transmit coordinates of where the relay station sends on 80% of its communications traffic, the pair are assaulted and communications jammed. With three Jem'Hadar ships also on course to intercept, Commander Sisko makes the hard decision to keep the Defiant cloaked and leave his two officers to their fate.

While the crew adjust to this loss, and as Odo's obsession with the Omarion Nebula deepens, a Jem'Hadar patrol manages to detect the Defiant through its cloak, and launch an attack. The crew manage to destroy one of the Dominion vessels before main power is forced offline and the Defiant loses shields. Dozens of Jem'Hadar troops then board the ship. In the ensuing combat, the Romulan Sub-Commander is knocked unconscious and Major Kira apparently shot by a Jem'Hadar beam weapon.

Odo rescues Kira, escaping in a small shuttlecraft. Odo informs Kira that they are currently en route to the Omarion Nebula. She is dismayed, reminding him she did not consent to being placed in her current situation, and arguing that they should have headed straight back to the Alpha Quadrant. Using the vessel's sensors, Kira detects an M-class rogue planet inside the Omarion Nebula. Odo resolves to land on the planet. There, Odo and Kira encounter an apparent lake of shapeshifters, as a group of them solidify and welcome Odo home.

=== Part 2 ===
Odo and Kira have landed on a starless planet in the Omarion Nebula, which they have discovered is Odo's homeworld. A female shapeshifter encourages him to begin the slow process of learning who he is, and discovering the bond they share, known as the "Great Link". Odo is pleased to be reunited with his people, but they don't like Kira because she is a "solid" lifeform. Meanwhile, forced to abandon the Defiant during the Jem'Hadar attack days before, Sisko and Bashir are traveling alone in a shuttle when O'Brien and Dax, who have met the Founders, rescue them. Upon returning to the space station, Sisko learns that the Federation is negotiating a peace treaty with the Dominion, represented by one of the Founders, a Vorta named Borath.

When Sisko finds out that the Romulans have been excluded from the peace talks, he expresses his concern to Admiral Nechayev, but she dismisses his fears. On the other side of the wormhole, Kira is unable to contact Sisko because of interference from a hidden power source, while Odo struggles with his "lessons" at shapeshifting. Later, the female shapeshifter tells Odo that they came to this isolated planet a long time ago, as a result of persecution at the hands of the solids, then reveals he was sent as an infant to explore the galaxy, then return home.

While looking for Odo, Kira discovers a locked door — something for which shapeshifters would have no use. This arouses her curiosity. Back on the space station, a Jem'Hadar soldier starts a fight with O'Brien, in part because the newcomers have been given free rein. Sisko then discovers that the Federation has signed the treaty, agreeing to give control of the Bajoran sector — including the station and the wormhole — to the Dominion. Over Sisko's objections, he and his crew will be reassigned.

A happy Odo tells Kira he has decided to remain with his people, but Kira asks him to help her get to the hidden power source before she departs. He is intrigued when Kira reveals it is behind the locked door she has found. Meanwhile, Jem'Hadar soldiers shoot Romulan officer T'Rul in cold blood, then attack an outraged Sisko. Deciding that matters have gotten out-of-hand, Sisko then bands with Garak, Dax, Bashir, and O'Brien on a suicide mission to steal a runabout, collapse the wormhole, and keep the Dominion on its side of the galaxy for decades.

Garak is shot while Sisko and the others escape. Once aboard a runabout, they fire on the wormhole, collapsing it in a blinding explosion. Meanwhile, Odo unlocks the mysterious door, where he and Kira find Jem'Hadar soldiers waiting. The two are taken to an interrogation room where Sisko and the Defiant crew sit with their eyes closed, devices attached to their heads. Borath is there conducting a virtual reality simulation on the crew to determine how much they will sacrifice to avoid war with the Dominion. The female shapeshifter then arrives, disclosing that her people are the mysterious Founders. Saddened that his own race is responsible for so much death and misery, Odo demands that his friends be released, then chooses to return with them. Surprised that their experiences since the Defiant attack didn't really happen, Sisko and the crew return to the station. Knowing the truth about his people, Odo now knows that even though he may feel like an outsider, his place is with his friends.

== Reception ==
The moment when Sisko decloaks the Defiant spacecraft for the first time was rated as one of the top 35 moments in Star Trek in 2015, by Geek.com, highlighting that it marked a 'great start' to the third season. The episode was also noted by Wired as a pivotal episode for the series, helping to explain the origins of Odo, set the Dominion War saga up, and introduce the Defiant spacecraft, which would be an important plot element in many later episodes.

In 2015, Geek.com recommended this episode as "essential watching" for their abbreviated Star Trek: Deep Space Nine binge-watching guide. They note that the third season marked the arrival of screenwriter Ronald D. Moore, and increased use of longer story arcs.

Wired (United Kingdom edition) recommended "The Search" as one of the best episodes of the franchise, in their review of episodes to watch on a video streaming service.

In 2018, CBR rated "The Search" paired with previous episode "The Jem'Hadar", as the 14th best multi episode story of Star Trek. They note the triple effect of introducing the USS Defiant, establishing the lethality of the Jem'hadar, and linking Odo-related plot connections. In 2020, Io9 said "The Search" (both parts) was one of the "must watch" episodes from the series, it introduces the Defiant and links Odo to the Dominion.

== Release ==
The episode was released on June 3, 2003 in North America as part of the Season 3 DVD box set. This episode was released in 2017 on DVD with the complete series box set, which had 176 episodes on 48 discs.

On July 6, 1999, both parts of "The Search" were released on LaserDisc in the United States. Released by Paramount Home Video, the double side 12" disc had a total runtime of 92 minutes.

This episode was released in the United Kingdom on VHS with parts I & II on one cassette (VHR 4135).

== Novelization ==
"The Search" was novelized by author Diane Carey, and published in 1994. This was one of several episode novelizations, in addition to original stories.

== See also ==
- List of Star Trek: Deep Space Nine novels
