= Improbable Cause =

- Star Trek: Deep Space Nine episode
- Episode no.: Season 3 Episode 20
- Directed by: Avery Brooks
- Story by: Robert Lederman; David R. Long
- Teleplay by: René Echevarria
- Production code: 465
- Original air date: April 24, 1995

Guest appearances
- Andrew J. Robinson as Garak; Paul Dooley as Enabran Tain; Carlos Lacámara as Retaya; Joseph Ruskin as Informant; Darwyn Carson as Romulan; Julianna McCarthy as Mila

Episode chronology
← Previous "Through the Looking Glass"	Next → "The Die Is Cast"
- Star Trek: Deep Space Nine season 3

"Improbable Cause" is the 66th episode of the television series Star Trek: Deep Space Nine, the 20th episode of the third season. It is the first half of a two-part episode, concluded in the following episode, "The Die is Cast".

Set in the 24th century, the series follows the adventures of the crew of the space station Deep Space Nine near the planet Bajor, adjacent to a wormhole connecting the Alpha and Gamma Quadrants of the galaxy, as the Bajorans recover from a decades-long occupation by the imperialistic Cardassians. The Gamma Quadrant is home to a hostile empire known as the Dominion, ruled by the shapeshifting Founders.

In this episode, Deep Space Nine's security chief Odo investigates a bombing at the clothing shop of Cardassian spy-turned-tailor Elim Garak, leading him to discover secret Cardassian maneuvering against the Dominion.

== Plot ==
When Garak's shop explodes, Odo finds that it was destroyed by a bomb set up to make it look accidental. He tracks down a possible suspect but before he can catch up with him, the suspect assassin is killed when his ship blows up.

Odo studies the case further and discovers evidence that the Romulans are behind it. They probably hired the dead suspect, and then killed him to help bury evidence. Odo digs up more information about the incident and finds that it is much more complicated than an assassination attempt on Garak. It seems the Romulans are planning to invade Cardassia and several members of the Obsidian Order, the Cardassian secret police, have been killed in mysterious mishaps recently.

Odo tries to get Garak to admit that he blew up his own shop, because he had spotted the assassin and wanted to disrupt the assassination plan and get Odo to begin an investigation. All of the Cardassians recently killed were close to Enabran Tain, Garak's Obsidian Order mentor. Now that all of his associates are being targeted, Tain may be in danger. Odo and Garak set off to locate him.

En route they are captured by a Romulan starship. When they are brought aboard they find Tain is there. He tells them he ordered Garak's assassination, as well as those of the rest of his former associates. He is wiping his history clean in preparation for a power play. The Tal Shiar, the Romulan intelligence agency, have formed an alliance with the Obsidian Order, and they are planning an attack on the Founders in the Gamma Quadrant. Once the Dominion is taken out, Tain plans to take control of the Obsidian Order. Since his attempt on Garak's life failed, he asks Garak to join him, and Garak immediately agrees.

== Reception ==
In 2015, Geek.com recommended this episode as "essential watching" for their abbreviated Star Trek: Deep Space Nine binge-watching guide, pairing it with the following episode "The Die is Cast". They note this duet of episodes is Garak-centric, and also includes special-effect scenes of space battles.

The Hollywood Reporter rated "Improbable Cause" as the 71st best episode of Star Trek overall, noting its mystery and intrigue. They also ranked it the 20th best episode in Star Trek: Deep Space Nine in 2016.

In 2018, CBR rated "Improbable Cause" coupled with its second part "The Die Is Cast", as the 12th best multi episode story arc of Star Trek.

As a pair with the following episode "The Die Is Cast", "Improbable Cause" was ranked as the sixth best episode of Star Trek: Deep Space Nine by Vulture. They highlight the character of Garak, played by Andrew Robinson. In 2019, Den of Geek also reviewed it paired with "The Die Is Cast", and ranked it among the best 25 (single or paired episodes) of the series.

== Releases ==
This episode was released on LaserDisc in Japan on October 2, 1998, in the half-season collection 3rd Season Vol. 2. The set included episodes from "Destiny" to "The Adversary" on double sided 12 inch optical discs; the box set had a total runtime of 552 minutes and included audio tracks in English and Japanese.

This episode was released on VHS paired with "Through the Looking Glass".
