= Waltz (Star Trek: Deep Space Nine) =

- Star Trek: Deep Space Nine episode
- Episode no.: Season 6 Episode 11
- Directed by: René Auberjonois
- Written by: Ronald D. Moore
- Production code: 535
- Original air date: January 5, 1998

Guest appearances
- Jeffrey Combs as Weyoun; Marc Alaimo as Gul Dukat; Casey Biggs as Damar

Episode chronology
← Previous "The Magnificent Ferengi"	Next → "Who Mourns for Morn?"
- Star Trek: Deep Space Nine season 6

"Waltz" is the 11th episode of the sixth season of the television series Star Trek: Deep Space Nine, the 135th episode overall.

Set in the 24th century, the series follows the adventures on Deep Space Nine, a space station near the planet Bajor, as the Bajorans recover from a long, brutal occupation by the imperialistic Cardassians. This episode is part of the Dominion War storyline, in which the United Federation of Planets is at war with the Dominion, an aggressive empire that has already absorbed Cardassia.

In this episode, former Cardassian leader Dukat, once the prefect of Cardassia's occupation of Bajor and then the orchestrator of its alliance with the Dominion, has been captured by the Federation and is en route to be tried for war crimes; he and Deep Space Nine′s captain Benjamin Sisko end up marooned together on a deserted planet, where Sisko must rely on the increasingly unstable Dukat for his survival.

== Plot ==
The USS Honshu is transporting Dukat to a hearing on his war crimes. Sisko, who is scheduled to testify, is also aboard and visits Dukat in the ship's brig. Dukat, who has been under treatment following a nervous breakdown over the death of his daughter Ziyal, assures Sisko that he has recovered. Suddenly, the ship comes under attack by Cardassian warships. Sisko awakens in a cave, seriously injured, to find that Dukat had managed to get him to a shuttlecraft and escape to a nearby planet, where he tended to Sisko's wounds. Dukat informs him that the shuttle is inoperable, but he is sending out a distress signal.

Unbeknownst to Sisko, Dukat is hallucinating conversations with his former Dominion liaison Weyoun, who mocks him about his mental breakdown, then his aide Damar, who advises him to kill Sisko. Dukat reveals that he intends to — after Sisko shows him the respect he deserves. While Dukat "talks" with his colleagues, Sisko discovers that the communications system is, in fact, not sending out a signal. When Dukat returns, Sisko tests him by asking him to check the system. He does, and tells Sisko the unit is working fine.

Meanwhile, Worf searches for Sisko in the Defiant, but has limited time before he must leave to rendezvous with a convoy of Federation ships. Sisko repairs the communications system while Dukat is away, then plays along as Dukat defends his treatment of the Bajorans. However, when a hallucination of the Bajoran Major Kira taunts him, he becomes angry, firing wildly at the vision with his phaser. Dukat then discovers the distress signal has been repaired, and destroys it, then attacks the defenseless Sisko for his "betrayal".

Bruised and battered after Dukat's attack, Sisko presses Dukat to talk about the Bajorans. Dukat insists on his benevolence and good will towards Bajor, but Sisko berates him for his hypocrisy and self-deception. Enraged, Dukat finally snaps, admitting his hatred of the Bajorans and angrily declaring that he should have killed them all. While Dukat is ranting, Sisko knocks him out and manages to make his way to the shuttle, discovering it to be intact. Dukat recovers, pursues Sisko to the shuttle and overpowers him. Sisko challenges Dukat to kill him, but Dukat instead leaves him behind and takes off in the shuttle, vowing to destroy Bajor. The Defiant crew then picks up a signal from Dukat leading them to Sisko. Dukat, however, escapes, leaving Sisko vowing to defeat him and protect Bajor at all costs.

== Production ==
The episode was directed by cast member René Auberjonois, who directed a total of eight episodes of Deep Space Nine, whilst he portrayed the character of Odo.
