= The Die Is Cast (Star Trek: Deep Space Nine) =

- Star Trek: Deep Space Nine episode
- Episode no.: Season 3 Episode 21
- Directed by: David Livingston
- Written by: Ronald D. Moore
- Production code: 467
- Original air date: May 1, 1995

Guest appearances
- Andrew J. Robinson as Garak; Paul Dooley as Enabran Tain; Kenneth Marshall as Michael Eddington; Leland Orser as Lovok; Leon Russom as Vice Admiral Toddman

Episode chronology
← Previous "Improbable Cause"	Next → "Explorers"
- Star Trek: Deep Space Nine season 3

"The Die Is Cast" is the 67th episode of the television series Star Trek: Deep Space Nine, the 21st episode of the third season. It is the second half of a two-part episode, concluding the story begun in the previous episode, "Improbable Cause". This episode was first televised in broadcast syndication in May 1995.

Set in the 24th century, the series follows the adventures of the crew of the space station Deep Space Nine, adjacent to a wormhole connecting the Alpha and Gamma Quadrants of the galaxy. The Gamma Quadrant is home to a hostile empire known as the Dominion, whose Founders are the shapeshifting Changelings.

In the previous episode, Deep Space Nine's security chief Odo, a Changeling with no allegiance to the Dominion, discovered a planned surprise attack against the Dominion by the intelligence agencies of two Alpha Quadrant empires, the Romulan Tal Shiar and the Cardassian Obsidian Order. In this episode, the exiled former Obsidian Order agent Garak has to interrogate Odo to prove his loyalty to his former mentor, as the Tal Shiar and Obsidian Order begin their ill-fated attack on the Founders.

== Plot ==
Garak and Odo have not been heard from on Deep Space Nine in several days, following their departure in a runabout to investigate an attempt on Garak's life. The crew of Deep Space Nine is alarmed when a large Cardassian–Romulan fleet suddenly de-cloaks and flies through the wormhole to the Gamma Quadrant. The fleet, under the command of Cardassian Enabran Tain and Romulan Colonel Lovok, aims to destroy the homeworld of the Founders of the Dominion. Tain has offered Garak the opportunity to return from exile, and the two reminisce about their past together in the Obsidian Order.

Back on DS9, the senior staff view Tain's message laying out the Obsidian Order and the Tal Shiar's plans to cripple the Dominion. Vice Admiral Toddman admits that while the Federation doesn't condone the plan, they don't intend to stop it either and must simply hope they are successful but plan for the worst; he orders DS9 on full alert and the Defiant and its crew to remain at the station for its protection. Commander Sisko, refusing to abandon his crewmate, launches an unsanctioned mission to take the Defiant into the Gamma Quadrant to rescue Odo.

Tain instructs Garak to interrogate Odo for information about the Founders, using a device that inhibits his ability to shape-shift and prevents him from regenerating. Knowing that Tain will never trust him if he refuses, Garak reluctantly does so. As the device causes Odo great pain, Garak begs him to reveal anything of use, even if it is a lie. Odo confesses his desire to return to his fellow Changelings, and that he loves Major Kira. Garak then deactivates the device. Despite this, Garak claims to Tain that Odo never broke.

When the fleet arrives at the Founders' homeworld, they find little resistance and open fire, but soon realize that the planet is abandoned, and the mission was a trap. Suddenly, Dominion ships appear and engage the fleet, vastly outnumbering them. In the resulting battle, the Cardassian–Romulan fleet is annihilated.

Knowing that the battle is lost, Garak leaves the bridge of his ship to rescue Odo. They encounter Lovok, who reveals himself to be a Founder and assists Odo in escaping. He confesses that the Founders viewed the Tal Shiar and Obsidian Order as threats and helped push Tain's plan forward in order to destroy them, meaning the only threats left are the Federation and the Klingons. He invites Odo to return to the Founders, but Odo declines.

Garak attempts to save Tain, but Tain refuses to leave, and Garak refuses to abandon him, so Odo knocks Garak unconscious and escapes with him on the runabout. Trying to escape the crossfire, they are badly damaged and fearing the end, Garak asks Odo for forgiveness. Odo gives it, understanding Garak's desire to return to his people. The Defiant then rescues them from the battle.

Back on Deep Space Nine, Toddman confirms there are no signs of other survivors from the attack, and subtly commends Sisko by deciding not to court-martial him. Garak, exiled once again, sits mournfully in the wreckage of his shop. Odo arrives and invites Garak to join him for breakfast.

== Reception ==
The A.V. Club in their review in 2012, found the episode "great stuff, thrilling and shocking", elaborating that it was "bold storytelling which makes for great drama."

In 2015, Geek.com recommended this episode as "essential watching" for their abbreviated Star Trek: Deep Space Nine binge-watching guide, pairing it with the previous episode "Improbable Cause".

In 2018, CBR rated "Improbable Cause" coupled with "The Die Is Cast", as the 12th best multi episode story arc of Star Trek. They call it a "fun showcase for Garak", the space station's tailor.

In 2018, reviewed as a pair with the preceding episode "Improbable Cause", "The Die Is Cast" was ranked as the sixth best episode of Star Trek: Deep Space Nine by Vulture.

== Releases ==
The episode was released on VHS, paired with "Explorers".

This episode was released on LaserDisc in Japan on October 2, 1998, in the half-season collection 3rd Season Vol. 2. The set included episodes from "Destiny" to "The Adversary" on double sided 12 inch optical discs; the box set had total runtime of 552 minutes and included audio tracks in English and Japanese.

The episode was released on June 3, 2003 in North America as part of the season 3 DVD box set. This episode was released in 2017 on DVD with the complete series box set, which had 176 episodes on 48 discs.
