= Explorers (Star Trek: Deep Space Nine) =

- Star Trek: Deep Space Nine episode
- Episode no.: Season 3 Episode 22
- Directed by: Cliff Bole
- Story by: Hilary J. Bader
- Teleplay by: René Echevarria
- Production code: 468
- Original air date: May 8, 1995

Guest appearances
- Marc Alaimo as Dukat; Bari Hochwald as Dr. Lense; Chase Masterson as Leeta

Episode chronology
← Previous "The Die Is Cast"	Next → "Family Business"
- Star Trek: Deep Space Nine season 3

"Explorers" is the 68th episode of the television series Star Trek: Deep Space Nine, the 22nd episode of the third season. It premiered May 8, 1995.

Set in the 24th century, the series follows the adventures of the crew of the space station Deep Space Nine near the planet Bajor, as the Bajorans recover from a decades-long, brutal occupation by the imperialistic Cardassians. In this episode, the human station commander Benjamin Sisko, having taken an interest in Bajoran culture, builds a replica of an ancient Bajoran spacecraft.

The episode achieved a Nielsen rating of 6.7 points when it was first broadcast.

== Plot ==
Benjamin Sisko has been studying Bajoran culture, and believes that old legends may hold a grain of truth: ancient Bajorans may have travelled outside their own solar system using solar wind to power small craft—perhaps even reaching as far as the Cardassian homeworld.

Sisko has obtained diagrams of a lightship and decides to build the vessel and retrace the route of the ancient Bajorans. A brief conversation with the Cardassian officer Dukat reveals political undertones to the adventure: a success would mean accepting accomplishments of the ancient Bajorans that the Cardassians have dismissed as "fairy tales". Despite initial reluctance, Sisko's son Jake agrees to accompany him on the voyage.

The trip proves an opportunity for the Siskos to talk. Jake reveals that he has been accepted to the Pennington Institute, a prestigious school in Wellington, New Zealand; but he plans to defer his admission so as not to leave his father alone on Deep Space Nine. He also recommends that his father start dating again.

When the ship flies into a "tachyon eddy", it is accelerated to warp speeds, but the sails and navigation instruments are damaged. Sisko attempts to call for help, but they are unable to contact Deep Space Nine. Soon, however, they are hailed by none other than Dukat, who announces that they have reached Cardassian space. Furthermore, Dukat mentions that their arrival coincides with the discovery of the remains of a similar solar vessel wrecked centuries ago on Cardassia, thus proving the ancient Bajorans made the same voyage. Sisko remarks on the coincidence, intimating that the disclosure may have been a last-minute attempt on the part of the Cardassians to save face. As the travellers soak this information in and celebrate, the Cardassians set off fireworks to celebrate the achievement of Sisko and his son.

A subplot involves Dr. Julian Bashir discovering that his old academic rival from medical school is due to visit Deep Space Nine. Competitive and nervous, Bashir is taken aback by her apparently outright ignoring him at Quark's. After an evening getting drunk with Chief O'Brien, Bashir summons his courage and approaches the rival, who reveals that the envied assignment she took, afforded to her by her superior class rank, turned out uninspiring; furthermore, she failed to recognize Bashir due to thinking he was in fact an Andorian. Meanwhile, she has been following Bashir's work with great enthusiasm and they end the episode discussing their medical research in depth.

== Production ==
The Bajoran lightship was designed by Jim Martin working under production designer Herman Zimmerman. The special effect shots were done using computer generated imagery (CGI) produced by Industrial Light & Magic.

== Reception ==
The episode has been noted for being optimistic, featuring what one review called "an enthusiasm for space exploration". Screen Rant rated it the 13th most hopeful episode of Star Trek television.

In 2020, Io9 said this was one of the "must watch" episodes from the series remarking that it has "emotional, important father-son time between Sisko and his son".

== Releases ==
This episode was released on October 2, 1998 in Japan as part of the half-season LaserDisc box set 3rd Season Vol. 2.

The episode was released on June 3, 2003 in North America as part of the season 3 DVD box set. The DVD includes the featurette "Sailing Through the Stars: A Special Look at 'Explorers'", which featured discussion with the production designer Herman Zimmerman on the design of the lightship, as well as concept art from the episode. The episode was released again in 2017 with the complete series DVD box set, which again included the "Sailing Through the Stars" featurette.

It was released as on VHS tape by Paramount Home Video (catalog number VHR4145), paired with "The Die is Cast" on the same videocassette.

== See also ==
- Spacecraft in Star Trek
- Accession (Star Trek: Deep Space Nine)
