= Far Beyond the Stars =

- Star Trek: Deep Space Nine episode
- Episode no.: Season 6 Episode 13
- Directed by: Avery Brooks
- Story by: Marc Scott Zicree
- Teleplay by: Ira Steven Behr; Hans Beimler
- Cinematography by: Jonathan West
- Production code: 538
- Original air date: February 9, 1998

Guest appearances
- Brock Peters as Preacher / Joseph Sisko; Jeffrey Combs as Kevin Mulkahey / Weyoun; Marc Alaimo as Burt Ryan / Dukat; J. G. Hertzler as Roy Ritterhouse / Martok; Aron Eisenberg as Newsboy / Nog; Penny Johnson Jerald as Cassie / Kasidy Yates

Episode chronology
← Previous "Who Mourns for Morn?"	Next → "One Little Ship"
- Star Trek: Deep Space Nine season 6

"Far Beyond the Stars" is the 137th episode of the syndicated science fiction television series Star Trek: Deep Space Nine, the 13th episode of season 6. The teleplay was written by Ira Steven Behr and Hans Beimler, based on a story by Marc Scott Zicree, and directed by Avery Brooks, who also played the episode's – and series' – central character.

Set in the 24th century, the series takes place on Deep Space Nine, a space station adjacent to the galaxy's only known stable wormhole. In this episode, Captain Benjamin Sisko is worn down by the stress of the Dominion War. During a visit from his father, he experiences dream-like visions of being an African-American science-fiction writer facing racism in mid–20th century New York City. The main cast of the series, along with several recurring cast members, portray 20th-century humans in Sisko's vision; those who play alien characters appear in this episode without their alien costumes and makeup.

The episode received positive reviews and critics have called it one of the best Star Trek episodes of all time. It was novelized by Steven Barnes.

== Plot ==
Distraught by the death of a friend during the Dominion War, Captain Benjamin Sisko experiences a vision of 1953 New York City, where he is Benny Russell, an African-American science fiction writer. Russell works for the magazine "Incredible Tales", where his fellow writers resemble Sisko's crewmates: Albert Macklin (Miles O'Brien), Herbert Rossoff (Quark), and married couple Kay Eaton (Kira Nerys) and Julius Eaton (Julian Bashir). The magazine's illustrator Roy Ritterhouse (Martok) shows them sketches for an upcoming issue; Russell is drawn to one of a space station resembling Deep Space Nine, and offers to write the story for it. Magazine editor Douglas Pabst (Odo) tells Kay (who writes under a gender-neutral name) and Russell they are to be excluded from upcoming staff photos, as the magazine's readers might object to a woman and a "Negro" as science fiction writers.

That night, Russell is harassed by two white police officers, Ryan (Dukat) and Mulkahey (Weyoun). He encounters a street preacher (Joseph Sisko) who implores him to "write those words" in the name of "the Prophets". Russell finishes his story "Deep Space Nine", about the black captain of a space station. His girlfriend Cassie (Kasidy Yates) doubts his ability to earn a living as a writer, but is faithful to him despite flirtation from baseball player Willie Hawkins (Worf). A young hustler, Jimmy (Jake Sisko), laughs at Russell's idea of "colored people on the Moon".

At the magazine, the staff loves his story, including Pabst's secretary Darlene Kursky (Jadzia Dax), but Pabst refuses to print it, claiming that readers won't like a story with a black protagonist. Macklin proposes a compromise: frame the story as a dream, which Pabst reluctantly agrees to. While Russell and Cassie are out celebrating, Jimmy is shot and killed by officers Ryan and Mulkahey. When Russell protests, they beat him savagely.

On his first day back at the office weeks later, Russell is stunned to learn that the owner has pulped this month's issue rather than publish a story featuring a black hero, and Russell is fired. Russell has a mental breakdown and is taken away by an ambulance. The preacher appears and tells him that he is both the dreamer and the dream.

Sisko wakes up back on the station. He is deeply moved by his vision and wonders if somewhere, far beyond the stars, Benny Russell is really out there, dreaming of them.

=== Afrofuturism ===
Although Star Trek has been noted for its commentary on racism and racial relations since its debut in 1966, this episode in particular is considered to have the most "overt discussion of white supremacy and black identity."

== Production ==
=== Conception ===
Zicree – who was not a regular writer for the series – pitched the story with Jake Sisko as the main character, and did not deal directly with racial issues. He originally patterned the Bashir/Kira characters on Henry Kuttner and C. L. Moore, and the O'Brien character on Isaac Asimov. This story was combined with ideas that story editor Robert Hewitt Wolfe had written for a script called "Cold and Distant Stars", a very early draft for the season 3 two-part episode "Past Tense". The story, suggested by Wolfe, featured Sisko as a contemporary homeless man who believes he is a star base captain, but who is diagnosed as schizophrenic and drugged to suppress his visions. At that time, producer Ira Steven Behr had rejected the hallucinatory element in favor of a time-travel story, because it felt too much like a "gimmick". Researcher Allen Kwan wrote that the episode may have originally featured a more positive ending, where instead of showing Benny hospitalized with a breakdown, it would show him on a set, producing an episode of Deep Space Nine; that ending was reportedly not used for fears of breaking the continuity of the franchise.

=== Design ===
The production crew included several references to past Star Trek series and episodes, as well as other science fiction series. For instance, a memo from Pabst to Rossoff is visible in the office, complaining to him that "no one would believe that a cheerleader could kill vampires", a reference to Shimerman's role as Principal Snyder on Buffy the Vampire Slayer.

Much work was put into making the New York City presented look authentic. Brooks, who both directed the episode and played Sisko/Russell, went to great lengths to ensure period authenticity, even during post-production. Brooks went to the music spotting session, and had long discussions about things such as what music Russell would dance to, and the style of the scoring. The only other Star Trek director to attend a music spotting session was LeVar Burton, when working on Star Trek: The Next Generation. Inequality was also portrayed through design; the ambulance which carries Benny was portrayed as dirty and outdated because, as Brooks notes, "that's what they would have sent."

=== Filming and makeup ===
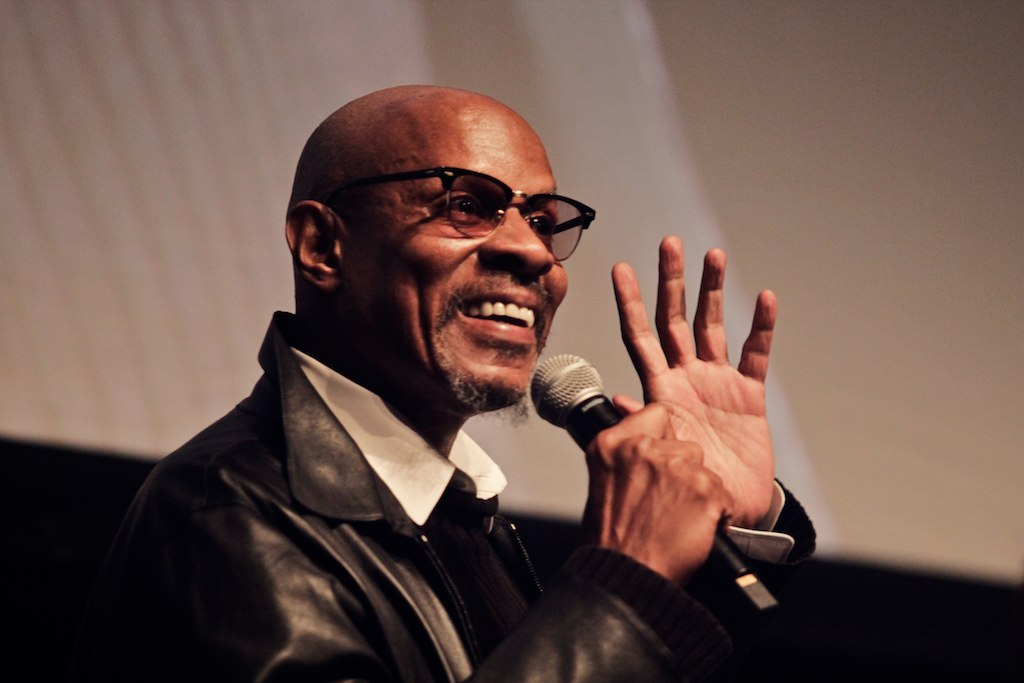
Avery Brooks both directed the episode and played Sisko/Russell.

Brooks was chosen to direct by the production staff because they wanted a director who had personally experienced racism. The scene where Russell collapses and has a breakdown was perhaps more realistic than most fans had realized. Once the assistant director called cut, Brooks did not stop. Brooks was so into the part that, as Lou Race remarked, even if he had stayed for half an hour, Brooks would have "kept on".

The cast had little trouble separating their characters in this episode from the ones they normally played. Ira Stephen Behr, for instance, had been concerned at how René Auberjonois might react to being the only main cast member to play a "bad guy". However, Auberjonois loved the part, and was delighted to play it. Armin Shimerman (Quark/Rossoff) agreed, claiming that Rossoff is not an extension of Quark, as Rossoff, a communist, was "about as far from a Ferengi as you can get". Jeffrey Combs (Weyoun/Mulkahey) had some trouble at first "finding Weyoun" in Mulkahey, but realized that Mulkahey and Weyoun are both "suppressing authority figures" in Sisko's mind, and played the character from that perspective.

With few science-fiction elements, one of the few special effects in the episode was a shot where a drawing of the space station falls out of Russell's hand, and lands near the foot of a police officer. The drawing was attached to a helium balloon which was connected to some monofilament on a fishing line, and had to be "yanked" towards the foot of the officer, and land at the right orientation for the camera. Despite concerns that it could take hundreds of tries, the shot was completed on the second attempt.

Since most characters appeared as humans, only standard makeup was required. Appearing out of costume was an unusual experience for many cast members. Shimerman said that wearing the mask for Quark normally helped him avoid being nervous about how he looked on camera, and that appearing without it was a "very bizarre" experience. J. G. Hertzler had never appeared on Deep Space Nine out of Klingon makeup as Martok, and enjoyed the role of Ritterhouse. Hertzler draws as a hobby, so when Ritterhouse was seen drawing in the episode, the actor was really drawing the cast.

== Reception ==
In 2012, Den of Geek ranked this the fourth-best episode of Star Trek: Deep Space Nine, praising the cast's performances, and called it "a treat" to see the actors such as Michael Dorn and Rene Auberjonois without their alien makeup and prosthetics.

The A.V. Club's Zack Handlen said that by escaping the "trap" of cloaking its concerns in "pure symbol" that some other Star Trek episodes fall into, the episode ends up creating something unique. Empire ranked "Far Beyond the Stars" 4th out of the 50 top episodes of any show Star Trek as of 2016. They also said that seeing the cast out of makeup was an "added bonus". A 2015 binge-watching guide for Star Trek: Deep Space Nine by Wired recommended not skipping this "essential" episode, and said it is probably the best of the series. In 2019, Den of Geek included it among the top 12 best morality plays of the Star Trek franchise.

The Chicago Tribune praised the episode for having the racism it showed be on Earth, and not on some "far-flung planet". They also argued the episode would "shatter whatever remnants of that opposition [to Avery Brooks' casting which still] linger". The Pittsburgh Post-Gazette agreed, and said fans will consider this the "most remarkable episode in the history of Deep Space Nine", and that once Lofton's character (Jimmy) says the "N-word" – a rare departure from the franchise's generally inoffensive language – they knew they were "not on Vulcan any more".

U.K. science fiction magazine and website SciFiNow ranked this one of the top ten episodes of Star Trek: Deep Space Nine in 2020, describing it as "one of the series' most powerful episodes" and commending it for taking on racism.

=== Academic ===
In a paper published by the Bulletin of Science, Technology & Society, Allen Kwan argued that while the episode should be "given credit" for portraying racism more directly than any other episode, the ending in which Russell is institutionalized weakens the moral of the story. Parallels, Kwan claimed, can be drawn from Pabst, the racist magazine editor, to the producers of the Star Trek franchise. Kwan maintains that, like Pabst, the franchise as a whole tends to ignore actual diversity, instead opting to portray a future with only a single cultural and racial norm. Jan Johnson-Smith has noted parallels between Sisko being "the dreamer and the dream" and Martin Luther King Jr's "I Have a Dream" speech.

The storyline of the episode has been compared to a real-life experience of African-American science fiction author Samuel R. Delany, whose novel Nova was rejected by Analog magazine editor John W. Campbell, Jr. in 1967, claiming it was because "he didn't feel his readership would be able to relate to a black main character".

== Home media ==
This was one of the episodes included in the 2007 anthology DVD box set Star Trek Fan Collective: Captain's Log; the set also includes episodes from other series in the Star Trek franchise. The other DS9 episodes included in the set were "In the Pale Moonlight" and "What You Leave Behind", and the episodes include an introduction by Avery Brooks. Brooks chose this episode to be included in the set, and an interview with him is also included.

The full series of Deep Space Nine was released on DVD in 2003, and then re-released in 2017 in a box set format.
