= Past Tense (Star Trek: Deep Space Nine) =

- Star Trek: Deep Space Nine episodes
- Episode nos.: Season 3 Episodes 11 and 12
- Directed by: Reza Badiyi (Part I); Jonathan Frakes (Part II)
- Story by: Ira Steven Behr; Robert Hewitt Wolfe
- Teleplay by: Robert Hewitt Wolfe (Part I); Ira Steven Behr (Part II); René Echevarria (Part II)
- Production codes: 457 and 458
- Original air dates: January 2, 1995; January 9, 1995

Guest appearances
- Jim Metzler as Chris Brynner; Frank Military as B.C.; Dick Miller as Vin; Al Rodrigo as Bernardo; Tina Lifford as Lee; Bill Smitrovich as Michael Webb; Deborah Van Valkenburgh as Preston; Clint Howard as Grady; Richard Lee Jackson as Danny; John Lendale Bennett as Gabriel Bell

Episode chronology
← Previous "Fascination"	Next → "Life Support"
- Star Trek: Deep Space Nine season 3

"Past Tense" is a two-part episode from the third season of science fiction television series Star Trek: Deep Space Nine, the 57th and 58th episodes overall and the last episode to air before the premiere of its spinoff, Star Trek: Voyager. It is also the first episode of Star Trek: Deep Space Nine to not feature any scenes on the DS9 space station, except for the opening credits.

In the episode, a transporter anomaly sends Commander Sisko, Dr. Bashir, and Jadzia Dax back in time to a pivotal moment in Earth's history. The episode received critical acclaim for analyzing American social issues in a science fiction context, but also for addressing various societal issues such as homelessness, poverty, and technology.

== Broadcast ==
This installment of the Star Trek science fiction television show Star Trek: Deep Space Nine aired in two approximately 45-minute episodes on syndicated television in the United States. The first episode aired on January 2, 1995, and the conclusion aired on January 9, 1995.

== Plot ==
=== Part I ===
When Commander Sisko, Dr. Bashir, and Jadzia Dax beam down to Earth from the Defiant, an accident occurs and they materialize in San Francisco on August 30, 2024.

Sisko and Bashir are found by a pair of police officers, who believe them to be vagrants and warn them to get off the streets. They are escorted to one of the city's "sanctuary districts" – walled-off ghettos that are used to contain the poor, the sick, the mentally disabled, and anyone else who cannot support themselves. Sisko realises they have arrived on August 30, 2024, just before Sunday, September 1, when the Bell Riots happen, a violent confrontation in this particular sanctuary district that Sisko recalls as a watershed moment in human history. Dozens will be killed, including a man named Gabriel Bell; the leader of the demonstration. Bell will become a hero because of his self-sacrifice while protecting hostages, and public attitudes toward the disadvantaged will begin to change. Unable to find a building to sleep in, and unwilling to get involved with a nascent movement to air the residents' grievances for fear of altering history, Sisko and Bashir live on the street.

Meanwhile, Dax is found by a prominent businessman, Chris Brynner, CEO of Brynner Information Systems, who arranges accommodations for her. Later, attending an affluent party as his guest, she realizes that Sisko and Bashir may have been taken into the sanctuary district and persuades him to help confirm her suspicions.

Within the district, a fight breaks out when Sisko and Bashir resist attempts to take the ration cards they have been issued. A man who comes to their aid is killed, and Sisko and Bashir discover after the fact that he was Bell. Sisko quickly realizes that due to their presence, the course of history stands to be radically changed, since Bell is no longer present to safeguard the hostages in the historical narrative.

Back in the 24th century, the crew left on the Defiant, Major Kira, Odo, and Chief O'Brien, lose contact with Earth as all traces of the Federation, from Starfleet satellites and terraforming stations on Venus to the Utopia Planitia Fleet Yards, suddenly vanish; Bell's death has radically altered the timeline. O'Brien calculates several possible time periods in which Dax, Sisko, and Bashir might have arrived, and Kira and O'Brien begin transporting to one period at a time in order to search for them.

Back in the past, the district residents begin to riot, and one group storms the processing center and takes the employees hostage. Sisko and Bashir return there, and Sisko assumes Bell's identity and takes leadership of the revolt in an effort to keep the hostages safe through the night.

=== Part II ===
Sisko tries to ensure that no one gets hurt during the standoff, while at the same time understanding that Bell must die at the end of it. Early in the morning of Monday, September 2, 2024, Sisko makes demands to the governor, insisting they be given airtime to express their grievances. He wants the sanctuary districts closed and their residents to be given opportunities to earn an honest living.

Dax watches news coverage of the riots from Brynner's office, knowing Sisko and Bashir are caught in the sanctuary district and are in danger, and heads down to find them. She sneaks along an underground sewer line, but she is caught and delivered to the employment center to explain herself. Sisko and Bashir meet with her in secret to explain why they must stay until the crisis is over. She sneaks back out, certain that Brynner will be able to order a terminal activated at the processing center so that the leaders of the revolt can tell their stories and have them broadcast worldwide, which was the main force that turned public opinion against the sanctuary districts and led to their abolition.

After several fruitless attempts to locate their fellow officers, Kira and O'Brien finally transport themselves to the correct year and contact Dax. They stand by to rescue Sisko and Bashir if they can. Having rejected the hostage-takers' demands, the governor sends in a series of National Guard units to end the riots once and for all. The first unit storms the processing center and kills many rioters, and Sisko is shot while protecting one of the hostages. Bashir finds the wound to be non-fatal, and the two are horrified to see the bodies littering the streets of the sanctuary district as the riots subside. The two police officers who first confronted Sisko and Bashir agree to plant the pair's identification cards on two of the victims, and also to tell the truth about these events. All five Starfleet officers beam back to the Defiant in the 24th century and find that the timeline has been fully restored, except for the fact that Bell's entry in the historical records now shows Sisko's picture instead of his own.

== Development ==
The Attica Prison riot served as a source of inspiration for the Bell Riots from this episode. Another inspiration for the episode were original teleplay writer Robert Hewitt Wolfe's experiences with homeless people in California.

According to the DVD commentary, as this episode was finishing production, an article appeared in the Los Angeles Times describing a proposal by then-mayor Richard Riordan to create fenced-in "havens" for the city's homeless, to make downtown Los Angeles more desirable for business. The cast and crew were shocked that this was essentially the same scenario that "Past Tense" warned might happen in three decades, but was now being seriously proposed in the present.

== Reception ==
In 2015, Geek.com recommended this episode as "essential watching" for their abbreviated Star Trek: Deep Space Nine binge-watching guide.

SyFy ranked "Past Tense" as the seventh best time travel plot in Star Trek, in 2016.

In 2016, The Hollywood Reporter rated "Past Tense" (Parts I & II) the 47th best television episode of all Star Trek franchise television prior to Star Trek: Discovery, including live action and The Animated Series but not counting the movies. Between 1966 and 2005, there were about 726 episodes of Star Trek television.

Ars Technica in 2016, pointed out "Past Tense" as example of how the series had good stories and is "a beacon of hope for people living in dark times." They praise the "dogged Utopianism" and note how the characters try to help the poor.

In 2016, The Hollywood Reporter ranked this episode the 11th best of Star Trek: Deep Space Nine.

In 2016, Empire ranked this the 39th best out of the top 50 episodes of the 700 plus Star Trek television episodes.

The Atlantic reviewed "Past Tense" of Star Trek: Deep Space Nine in 2017, suggesting it was the "most political episode" of all Star Trek. They note that in the two-part episode, Benjamin Sisko travels back in time to early 21st-century Earth aboard the USS Defiant spacecraft. They show this is used as a plot device to explore America's issues with racism, violence, and "apathy toward human suffering".

In 2017, Business Insider listed "Past Tense, Part I" and "Past Tense, Part II" as some of the most underrated episodes of the Star Trek franchise at that time.

In 2018, Vulture rated the pair of "Past Tense" episodes as the 15th best episodes of Star Trek: Deep Space Nine. In 2018, Comic Book Resources ranked the "Past Tense" pair as the 20th best episodic saga of Star Trek overall.

In 2020, Den of Geek listed "Past Tense" as one of the best stories of Star Trek: Deep Space Nine.

In 2020, SciFiNow ranked this one of the top ten episodes of Star Trek: Deep Space Nine.

In 2020, The West Wing Thing, a podcast that normally discusses episodes of the political drama The West Wing, had a one-off episode where the hosts Dave Anthony and Josh Olson renamed their show The Star Trek Thing and discussed "Past Tense, Part I" and "Past Tense, Part II" instead of a West Wing episode because the duo considered "The Long Goodbye", which was The West Wing episode they planned to discuss that week, so boring to watch that they felt it wasn't talking about on their podcast and decided to skip it and just do "Past Tense" instead. Despite the fact the podcast episode was about "Past Tense" and not "The Long Goodbye", the latter was used as the title for that week's episode.

In 2021, Vox compared the vision of the future 2024 San Francisco presented in "Past Tense" with the state of some of the issues touched upon in the episode, such as poverty, riots, and technology. In an interview with one of the writers, Robert Hewitt Wolfe, about this episode, one prediction about the 2020s that they felt was inaccurate was the computer technology. The writer said they were not actually trying to be "predictive" but rather were inspired by their experiences at that time. Ira Behr (another of the episode's writers) said that one of the inspirations for episode were the homeless people in Santa Monica, California.

In 2024, a BBC piece described the similarities between the fictional depiction of homelessness in Past Tense with reality. One person interviewed for the piece, Stephen Pimpare, described the episode as reflecting the attitude that people prefer to "hide the problem, rather than addressing its causes" and that high society is oblivious to the plight of the homeless when they are not visibly present.

== See also ==
- Future history
- Homelessness in the San Francisco Bay Area
