= Benjamin Sisko =

Character from TV series Star Trek: Deep Space Nine

- Star Trek: Deep Space Nine character
- First appearance: "Emissary" (1993)
- Last appearance: "What You Leave Behind" (1999)
- Created by: Rick Berman; Michael Piller
- Portrayed by: Avery Brooks

In-universe information
- Full name: Benjamin Lafayette Sisko
- Species: Human/Prophet
- Occupation: Starfleet officer
- Spouses: Jennifer Sisko; Kasidy Yates
- Children: Jake Sisko
- Origin: New Orleans, Earth

Benjamin Lafayette Sisko is a fictional character in the Star Trek franchise portrayed by Avery Brooks. He was the main character of the television series Star Trek: Deep Space Nine (DS9), which was originally broadcast between 1993 and 1999. The character has also appeared in various books, comics, and video games within the Star Trek franchise.

== Character history ==
Born in 2332 in New Orleans, Louisiana, Benjamin is the son of Joseph Sisko and a human woman named Sarah, who was possessed by a Bajoran Prophet, in order to conceive Benjamin. Sarah disappeared a short time later once the prophet left her body and died in an accident several years later. Joseph eventually met and married another woman, who raised Benjamin as her son. Benjamin remained unaware of these events until well into his adulthood. Sisko loves baseball, a sport that has largely disappeared by the 24th century but is kept alive by a small group of aficionados.

Sisko entered Starfleet Academy in 2350. During his sophomore year, he was in a field-study assignment on Starbase 137. He met a woman named Jennifer in Babylon, New York, on Gilgo Beach, shortly after graduating from the Academy. The two eventually wed and had a son named Jake. As a Starfleet officer coming up through the ranks, Sisko was mentored by Curzon Dax. Sisko served in the Battle of Wolf 359, in which Jennifer is killed.

In 2369, Sisko is assigned to the Bajoran sector to command Deep Space Nine and help Bajor's recovery from the recently concluded Cardassian occupation, shepherding them toward possible membership in the Federation. Upon Sisko's first visit to Bajor, the Kai (Bajor's spiritual leader), Opaka Sulan, labels him "the Emissary of the Prophets" and gives him one of the Bajoran Orbs. By studying the orb and nearby stellar phenomenon Sisko and Jadzia Dax find a stable wormhole within the Bajor system, the other end of which connects to the distant Gamma Quadrant. Sisko and Dax encounter the mysterious entities living within it, named "Prophets" by the Bajorans. Although most Bajorans immediately accept Sisko as their highest spiritual leader, this causes several conflicts with his role as a Starfleet Officer. His personal ideals instilled in him by Starfleet leave him uncomfortable with being viewed as a religious figure, and a number of Bajorans resent the notion that their emissary is not a Bajoran himself.

It eventually is discovered that the Gamma Quadrant is home to the Dominion, an aggressive and expansionist empire. Several years of cold war followed before the outbreak of what would come to be known as the Dominion War. Klingons, Romulans, and even the Cardassians eventually joined forces with the Federation against them. Sisko fulfills the Prophets' destiny for him in the series finale, "What You Leave Behind", by confronting the Kosst Amojan–possessed Gul Dukat. Sisko throws himself and Dukat into the fiery abyss of the Bajoran Fire Caves, and Sisko is pulled into the Prophets' plane of existence to live with and learn from them. Sisko imparts a farewell to his new—and pregnant—wife, Kasidy Yates, informing her that although he does not know when, he will eventually return to her.

In Star Trek: Starfleet Academy, it is revealed that Sisko never returned and his fate remains a mystery. To Starfleet, Sisko went missing in action in the Fire Caves while he is become like a god to the Bajorans. Starfleet Academy cadet SAM attempts to solve the mystery without success, but learns more about Sisko in the process. The instructor teaching the course on the mystery of Sisko is revealed to be Illa Dax, the current host of Sisko's old friend and mentor Dax.

== Reception ==
In 2009, IGN ranked Sisko as the 8th best character of Star Trek overall. In 2012, Paste Magazine rated Sisko as the #9 character of all Star Trek live-action television shows up to that time. In 2016, ScreenRant rated Benjamin Sisko as the fourth best character in Star Trek overall as presented in television and film up to that time. In 2016, Sisko was ranked as the 2nd most important character of Starfleet within the Star Trek science fiction universe by Wired magazine.

In 2017, The Washington Post ranked Sisko as the second best captain of Star Trek, and compared him to the American World War II general and president Eisenhower. They note how he tried to raise his son on the wayward space station despite being widowed, while contending with crew of dubious loyalties. In 2017, Space.com ranked Sisko the fifth-best captain of Star Trek. In 2017, Screen Rant ranked Sisko the third most attractive person in the Star Trek universe, in between Seven of Nine and Nyota Uhura.

In 2019, Cinema Blend ranked Sisko the fourth-best Star Trek Starfleet character of all time. Sisko was rated as one of the top seven time travelers of the Star Trek franchise, according to Nerdist in 2019, especially for his time traveling adventures in "Trials and Tribble-ations" and "Past Tense".

In 2018, CBR ranked Sisko the-third best Starfleet character of Star Trek, in between Janeway and Picard.

== Sources ==
- Okuda, Mike and Denise Okuda, with Debbie Mirek (1999). The Star Trek Encyclopedia. Pocket Books. ISBN 0-671-53609-5.
