= Heart of Stone (Star Trek: Deep Space Nine) =

- Star Trek: Deep Space Nine episode
- Episode no.: Season 3 Episode 14
- Directed by: Alexander Singer
- Written by: Ira Steven Behr; Robert Hewitt Wolfe
- Cinematography by: Jonathan West
- Production code: 460
- Original air date: February 6, 1995

Guest appearances
- Max Grodénchik as Rom; Aron Eisenberg as Nog; Majel Barrett as Computer voice; Salome Jens as Female Changeling

Episode chronology
← Previous "Life Support"	Next → "Destiny"
- Star Trek: Deep Space Nine season 3

"Heart of Stone" is the fourteenth episode of the third season of the American science fiction television series Star Trek: Deep Space Nine, and originally aired on February 6, 1995 in broadcast syndication. The story was written by Ira Steven Behr and Robert Hewitt Wolfe, while the episode was directed by Alexander Singer and the score was created by David Bell.

Set in the 24th century, the series follows the adventures on Deep Space Nine, a space station located near a stable wormhole between the Alpha and Gamma quadrants of the Galaxy; the Gamma Quadrant is home to an empire known as the Dominion, ruled by the shape-shifting Changelings. In this episode, Deep Space Nine's security chief Odo (René Auberjonois), a rogue Changeling who has rejected the Dominion, and Major Kira Nerys (Nana Visitor) are trapped together on a small moon, forcing Odo to admit he is in love with Kira; meanwhile, on the station, the Ferengi teenager Nog (Aron Eisenberg) tries to get Commander Benjamin Sisko's (Avery Brooks) support for his application to Starfleet Academy.

The character arcs launched in this episode, of Nog joining Starfleet and Odo dealing with his feelings for Kira, would be central to the two characters for the remainder of the series. The episode was the fourth most watched episode of the third season, with 8.3 million viewers, and received a mixed critical response.

== Plot ==
On board a runabout, Odo and Kira are in pursuit of a member of the terrorist group known as the Maquis. They follow the Maquis vessel to a small moon. Landing, they find the vessel is empty, and split up to search for the pilot. After a short while, Odo returns to find Kira with her foot caught in an expanding crystal mass that Odo is unable to remove.

As Kira is slowly being covered by the crystal, dangerous seismic tremors increase in the surrounding rock; Kira insists that Odo abandon her and flee to safety. He attempts to free her using an ultrasonic generator, and tells her about his past as they wait for the crystal to shatter. When the generator fails to work, and Kira is nearly engulfed in the crystal, Odo confesses his love for Kira. To his surprise, she says she is in love with him too.

Suspicious of Kira's response, Odo points a phaser at her, demanding to know who she really is. Kira and the crystal suddenly morph into a Changeling, one of the Founders of the Dominion (Salome Jens), who reveals that she stole the Maquis ship in order to try to convince Odo to return to the Dominion. She reveals the real Kira's location and transports away. Odo finds Kira and tells her of the Founder, but not of his feelings for her.

Meanwhile, on Deep Space Nine, Nog attempts to convince Commander Sisko to endorse his application to attend Starfleet Academy. Sisko is doubtful and suspects Nog is engaging in some underhanded scheme, especially since Nog's request was accompanied by the customary bribe Ferengi culture expects when making such requests. To test Nog's resolve, he gives him the task of counting the inventory of a cargo bay. Nog completes the task quickly, but Sisko still has doubts.

Sisko tells Nog that he will not give him a recommendation. Nog confesses that he wants to do it so that he does not end up like his father Rom (Max Grodénchik), whose engineering skills are not valued by Ferengi culture. Sisko, stunned by the young Ferengi's upstanding ambitions, agrees to recommend Nog to the academy.

When Nog tells Rom and his uncle Quark (Armin Shimerman) of his intention to join Starfleet, Quark adamantly forbids it; but Rom, in an uncharacteristic act of courage, stands up to his brother and proudly grants his permission for Nog to join Starfleet.

== Production ==
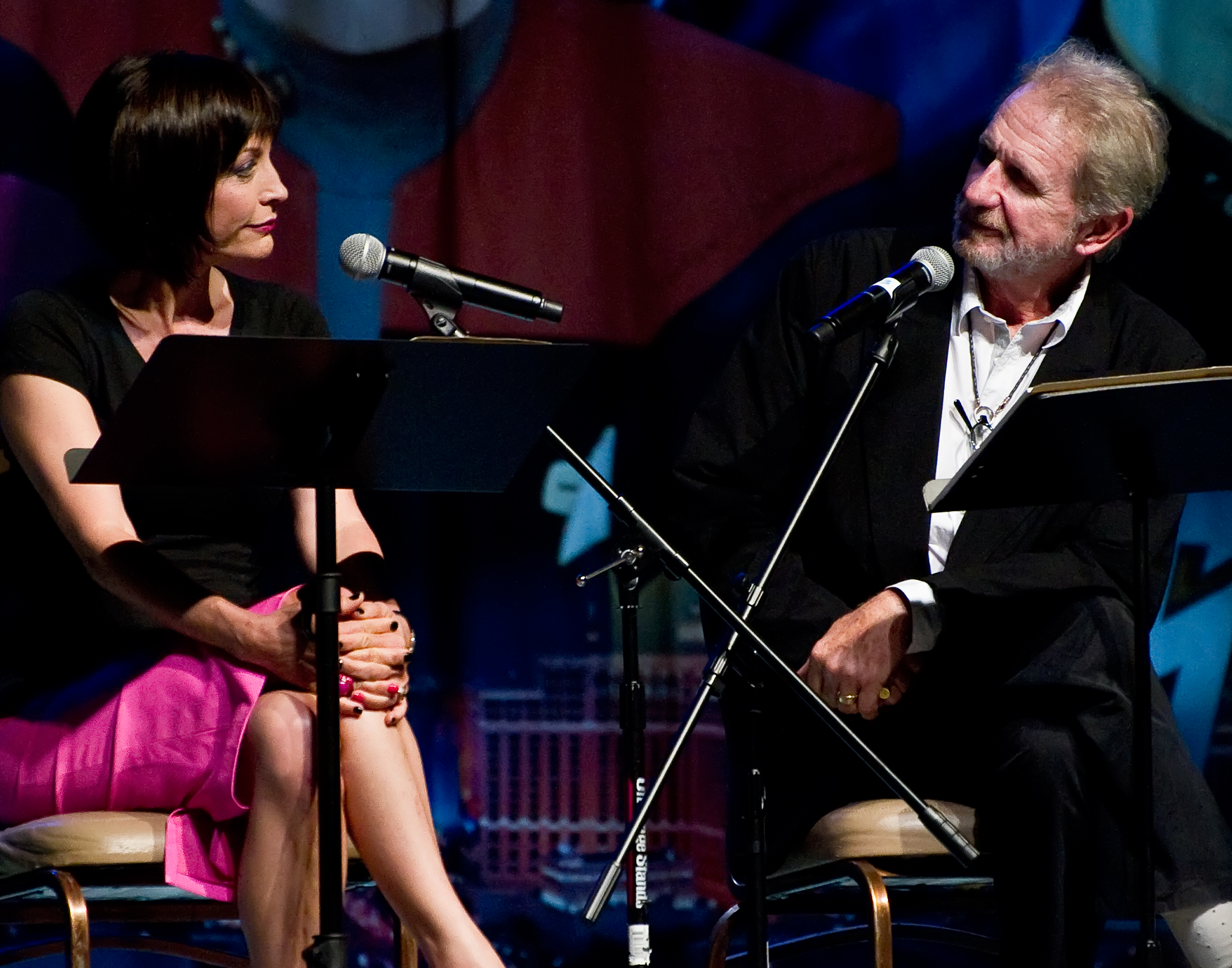
The storyline involving Nana Visitor and René Auberjonois was originally intended by the writers to be the A-Plot of the episode.

Ira Steven Behr and Robert Hewitt Wolfe conceived the story and wrote the script for "Heart of Stone", and intended the Odo/Kira storyline to be the A-Plot. Behr later thought that the performances of Eisenberg and Brooks elevated the Nog/Sisko story to equal status and would result in a better reaction by fans. The idea of having a character trapped was taken from the Ken Kesey novel Sometimes a Great Notion, in which a character is trapped under a log and drowned by rising water. Behr described the same scene in the 1971 film as "a great scene in a not so great movie". The episode was intended to be low budget, but heavy on characterisation. At one point, it was intended for Odo to sing the 1955 Richard Berry song "Louie Louie", which the character described as a sea shanty, but producers couldn't acquire the rights in time.

The cast and crew were unhappy with the rock prop used in the episode. Visual effects supervisor Glenn Neufeld strapped Visitor's feet to the stage in order to ensure that the crystal didn't move. Different versions of the crystal were then applied for different scenes, with the larger versions incorporating a seat for the actress so that she could relax inside the prop between takes. The prop caused problems for Visitor due to her claustrophobia, which was the second time during season three that a Wolfe scripted episode had caused her these types of problems after "Second Skin". She also didn't like how it appeared on screen: "I thought it was going to look like my body turning to stone. Instead I looked like a big old hot fudge sundae, and my head was the cherry on top."

Director Alexander Singer admitted that the prop wasn't what they envisioned, and work was conducted on it post-production to improve it. Post-production was also problematic as there were several morphing scenes involving Odo and the female Founder, which required reactions by other actors. Neufeld said that none of what they were aiming for worked in post-production, but it was saved by the visual effects company VisionArt, who managed to salvage the work. Jens agreed to re-appear as the female Founder she had previously appeared as in "The Search", and for her credit to only appear in the closing credits so as to avoid spoiling the twist in the Odo/Kira plot. Eisenberg was initially panicked by the script that showed Nog going to Starfleet Academy, as he thought the character was being written out of the show, but executive producer Rick Berman assured him that it wouldn't be the case. He later said that the scene where Nog talks to Sisko about his father was his favourite scene in the series.

== Themes ==
Children have been featured in Star Trek as major series characters since Wesley Crusher in Star Trek: The Next Generation. The character of Crusher had attended Starfleet Academy, but left Starfleet in the seventh-season episode "Journey's End", aired in February 1994. Jake Sisko was a minor character in Deep Space Nine, but had expressed a desire to be a writer rather than join Starfleet in the sixth episode of the third season, "The Abandoned". There was a desire to avoid the Crusher "chosen one" type storyline with Sisko, but after "The Abandoned", it was seen that there would no longer be a young character progressing through Starfleet as previously intended. Wolfe said: "Of Wesley, Jake, Alexander, and Nog, wouldn't it be funny if Nog were the one to end up as a Starfleet captain?". Ronald D. Moore agreed with the new character direction, saying: "Somehow, Captain Nog sounds cool".

Nog's progression through Starfleet was followed in later episodes, with the character promoted to the rank of Lieutenant Junior Grade by the time of the series finale, "What You Leave Behind". Odo's unrequited love for Kira had been hinted at throughout season three building up to the reveal in "Heart of Stone", which would be a repeating plot device up until the final episode of the series when Odo departs the crew.

== Reception ==
"Heart of Stone" was first broadcast on February 6, 1995, in broadcast syndication. It received Nielsen ratings of 8.3 million. This placed it in fourth place in the timeslot. This was an increase from the episode aired the previous week, as "Life Support" gained a rating of 8.2 million. It was the fourth most viewed episode of the season on first broadcast after "The Search", "Defiant" and "Meridian".

Several reviewers re-watched the episode after the end of the series. Zack Handlen reviewed the episode for The A.V. Club in October 2012. He had reservations about the episode up until the twist involving the Founder, and thought that Visitor's performance as Kira had been slightly off all episode. He thought that having Kira admit her feelings for Odo was rushed and was disappointed by it and felt it ruined what he had considered to be one of the best episodes of the season. He was pleased that Odo was as suspicious as he was, and the twist was made all the more striking by the performances. He felt that the Nog/Sisko story was just as good, having felt that Nog had been "off-putting" previously but the performance by Eisenberg in "Heart of Stone" was "amazing". He particularly praised Nog's monologue explaining his motives to join Starfleet, and said it was "terrific" as it was "exciting because it's unexpected".

Jamahl Epsicokhan of Jammer's Reviews, felt that the main Odo/Kira plot was "contrived" in that the female Founder stole a Maquis ship and set up the entire situation simply to attempt to convince Odo to return to his people. He said that the Nog and Sisko plot was "lightweight but amiable", and he gave the episode an overall score of 2.5 out of 4. Michelle Erica Green watched the episode for the website TrekNation, and also questioned the main plot. She wrote: "What was the shapeshifter going to do if someone OTHER than Kira was in the runabout with Odo? Did she sit around and wait for the two of them to leave the station together?" She had further concerns about the direction of the Odo and Kira relationship, and described the romance as a "cop-out". She thought that Odo's declaration of his feelings felt forced, and that the plot featuring a crystal creature attacking a crew member reminded her of something from Star Trek: The Original Series.

In 2019, Screen Rant ranked this as one of the top ten episodes for the character Nog, noting how it allowed the character to stop seeming "aimless".

In 2018, SyFy recommended this episode for its abbreviated watch guide for the Bajoran character Kira Nerys. They noted that it focuses on Kira and Odo, as they are stranded together and one is trapped, thus leading to a lot of discussion.

== Home media release ==
The first home media release of "Heart of Stone" was as a two episode VHS cassette alongside "Life Support" in the United Kingdom on June 12, 1995. This was followed in the United States and Canada with a single episode release on October 5, 1999. It was later released on DVD as part of the season three box set on June 3, 2003.

It was released on LaserDisc in the United States on October 26, 1999, paired with "Life Support". The disc was 12 inches with both sides used giving a runtime of 92 minutes, in NTSC format.
