= Two Days and Two Nights =

- Star Trek: Enterprise episode
- Episode no.: Season 1 Episode 25
- Directed by: Michael Dorn
- Story by: Rick Berman; Brannon Braga
- Teleplay by: Chris Black
- Production code: 125
- Original air date: May 15, 2002

Guest appearances
- Kellie Waymire - Crewman Elizabeth Cutler; Dennis Cockrum - Freebus; Geoff Meed - Dee'Ahn Male; Rudolf Martin - Ravis; DonnaMarie Recco - Dee'Ahn Female; Stephen Wozniak - Latia Male; Joseph Will - Crewman Michael Rostov; James Ingersoll - Risan Man; Dey Young - Keyla; Jennifer Williams - Risan Woman

Episode chronology
← Previous "Desert Crossing"	Next → "Shockwave"
- Star Trek: Enterprise season 1

"Two Days and Two Nights" is the twenty-fifth episode (production #125) of the television series Star Trek: Enterprise. The episode won the 2002 Emmy Award for Outstanding Hairstyling For A Series. The television show episode first aired on UPN on May 15, 2002. This episode was directed by Michael Dorn, with the story by Rick Berman and Brannon Braga, and the teleplay by Chris Black.

Captain Archer and the crew of Enterprise take shore leave on Risa. Back on their spacecraft Enterprise (NX-01), the alien Dr. Phlox enters hibernation, while T'Pol keeps an eye on the starship. The episode features numerous guest stars playing the roles of those that the crew of the NX-01 encounters during their visit to the pleasure planet.

== Plot ==
After arriving at planet Risa, half of the Enterprise's crew prepare for shore leave, and Captain Archer organizes lots. Winning a vacation himself, Archer boards a shuttlepod along with Commander Tucker, Lieutenant Reed, and Ensigns Mayweather and Sato. Once the shuttlepod lands on Risa, the crew go their separate ways. Archer notices a beautiful alien woman and her dog on the balcony just below his. Later, he strikes up a conversation, learning her name is Keyla. She claims that the Suliban massacred her entire family. He also learns that she is Tandaran, and when he confronts her with this discovery and asks what she wants, she knocks him out with a shot, and leaves.

Meanwhile, Sato is approached by a handsome alien called Ravis, and the two hit it off. She asks him to teach her his complex native language, and he invites her to the exotic steam pools. The next morning, she awakens happy with Ravis in bed beside her. Elsewhere, Tucker and Reed are in a noisy nightclub filled with exotic female aliens. Two women join them for a drink and invite them to view some nearby subterranean gardens, but when they reach the basement underneath the bar, the "females" suddenly morph into male aliens. Tucker and Reed are helpless as the aliens rob them and knock them out. Waking up the next morning, they escape the club in their underwear.

Meanwhile, in sickbay, Doctor Phlox prepares to take his annual six-day hibernation, but he informs Sub-Commander T'Pol that two days should be sufficient. Some time later, Mayweather contacts Enterprise after a rock-climbing accident, and is unnerved by Phlox's absence, but Crewman Cutler reassures him that she can handle his broken leg. He later has some trouble breathing, forcing Cutler and T'Pol to awaken Phlox. Though disoriented and incoherent, he still manages to formulate a suitable antidote, and collapses back into hibernation. On Risa the next morning, the Enterprise crew travel together in the shuttlepod back to their ship, each with an interesting story to tell, but with none willing to divulge any details.

== Production ==
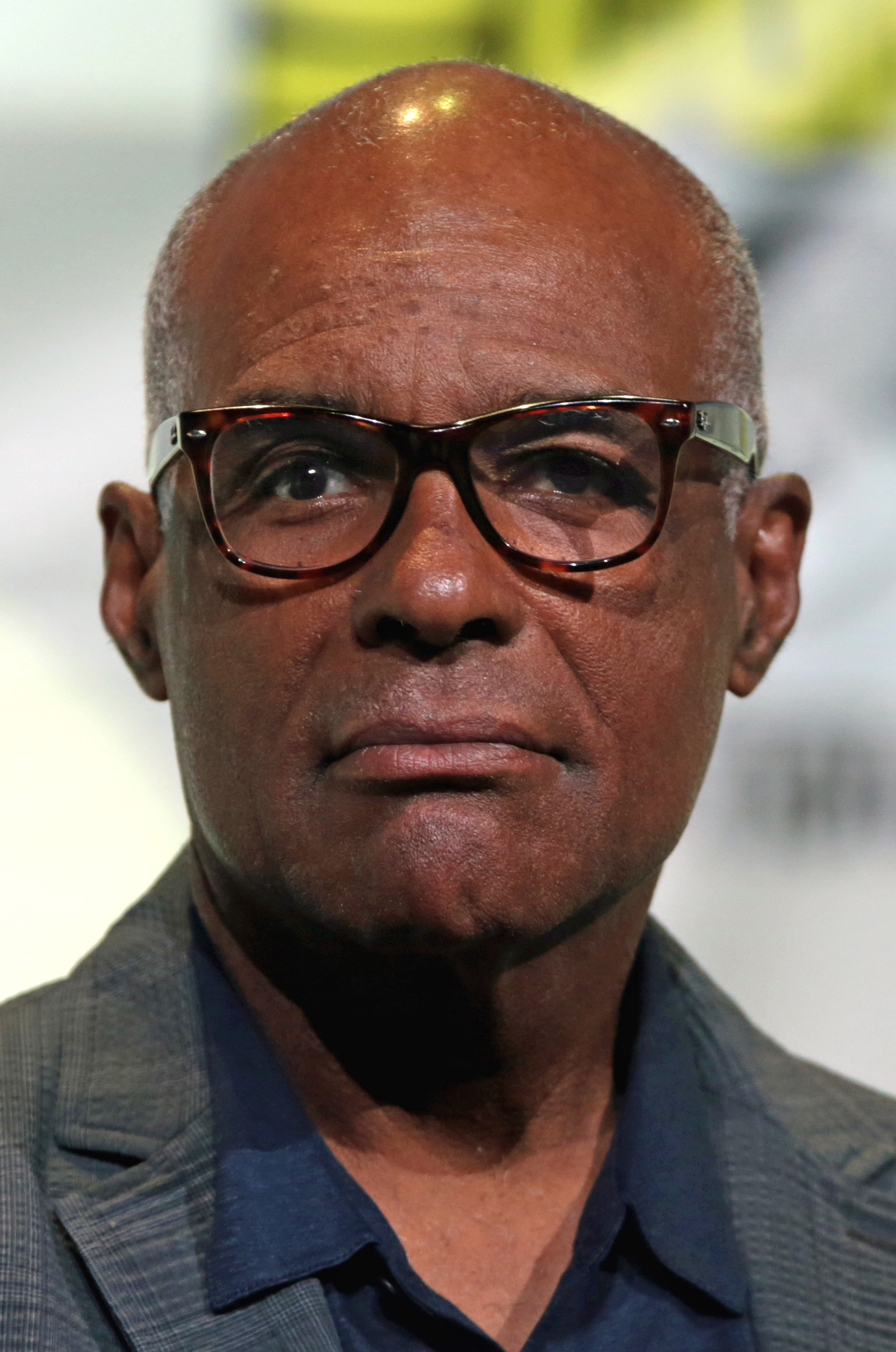
Directed by Michael Dorn.

This episode was directed by Michael Dorn, known for playing Worf in Star Trek: The Next Generation and Deep Space Nine. Before this, he directed three episodes of Deep Space Nine.

As it was near the end of the season, the episode faced serious budget constraints and although there was more they had wanted to do with the pleasure planet Risa they could not afford it. The subplot about Captain Archer received a lot of attention and rewriting; the idea was to have Archer in a mystery, for him to be like a Cary Grant in a Hitchcock film and for Keyla to be his romantic interest like Grace Kelly. Writer Chris Black felt it got a bit bogged down having to explain that backstory of how it connected to the episode "Detained" and, although he liked the episode, he wished it could have been more.

=== Guest stars ===
Guest stars included:

- Kellie Waymire as Crewman Elizabeth Cutler
- Rudolf Martin as Ravis
- Joseph Will as Crewman Michael Rostov
- Dennis Cockrum as Freebus
- Donna Marie Recco as Dee'Ahn female
- Dawn Stern as Latia female
- James Ingersol as Risan Man
- Jennifer Williams as Risan Woman
- Geoff Meed as Dee'Ahn male
- Stephen Wozniak as Latia male
- Dey Young as Keyla

Dey Young had previously appeared in the Star Trek: The Next Generation episode "The Masterpiece Society" and the DS9 episode "A Simple Investigation". The scenes with Dennis Cockrum as Freebus were cut from the final episode. They showed Enterprise exchanging a quantity of dilithium as payment for all costs of their visit.

This was the last of three appearances by Kellie Waymire, as Crewman Cutler. Waymire had a recurring role on Six Feet Under and her character was not used again. The actress died in November 2003, after half of season three had been filmed.

== Reception ==
"Two Days and Two Nights" was first aired in the United States on UPN on May 15, 2002. According to Nielsen Media Research, it received a 3.1/6 rating share among adults. This means it had an average of 5.3 million viewers. Enterprise was fourth in its timeslot, staying ahead of the fifth season finale of Dawson's Creek on The WB, but behind a special episode of Magic's Biggest Secrets on Fox.

Aint It Cool News gave it 3.5 out of five, and said: "The episode is teeming with small virtues" and in particular praised Dr. Phlox. Television Without Pity gave it a grade B+. Keith DeCandido of Tor.com gave it four out of ten, and complained about the general cheapness of the episode. He was critical of the cheap laughs, and compared Reed and Tucker to the characters played by Chris Kattan and Will Ferrell in A Night at the Roxbury. DeCandido noted the cheap production values and frequent references to cool things that are not shown on screen. Hoshi's storyline was the only part of the episode he did like.

A 2016, binge guide by Wired was critical of the episode and recommended skipping it entirely. They suggested it was "unwatchable", and said that it "makes you wonder if the cast were as embarrassed speaking the dialogue as we are listening to it." TechRepublic included the episode on its list of the five worst episodes of Enterprise. They said that the writers failed to establish a "theme, story arcs, or basic coherence" and that unrelated "inane vignettes" only serve to "make the crew appear either adolescent, incompetent, or both".

Linda Park picked this episode as her favorite from season one.

== Awards ==
The 2002 Emmy Award for Outstanding Hairstyling for a Series was won by the following team:

- Laura Connolly (Hairstylist)
- Roma Goddard (Hairstylist)
- Michael Moore (Designer)
- Gloria Pasqua Casny (Hairstylist)
- Cheri Ruff (Hairstylist)

It was Michael Moore's first win, having been nominated twice before for his work on Star Trek: Deep Space Nine and Buffy the Vampire Slayer.

== Home media ==
This episode was released as part of Enterprise season one, which was released in high definition on Blu-ray disc on March 26, 2013; the set has 1080p video and a DTS-HD Master Audio sound track.

== See also ==
- "Captain's Holiday" (TNG S3E19, also set on the fictional Star Trek exoplanet 'Risa')
- "Let He Who Is Without Sin..." (DS9 S5E7, also set on Risa)
- "The Mind's Eye" (TNG S4E24, starts off with Geordi on his way to Risa)
