= Civil defense (disambiguation) =

Civil defense is the protection of citizens from disasters and military attack.

It may also refer to:

- Grazhdanskaya Oborona (Russian for "Civil Defense"), a rock band
- Civil Defense (Star Trek: Deep Space Nine), a TV series episode
