= Wrongs Darker Than Death or Night =

- Star Trek: Deep Space Nine episode
- Episode no.: Season 6 Episode 17
- Directed by: Jonathan West
- Written by: Ira Steven Behr; Hans Beimler
- Production code: 541
- Original air date: March 30, 1998

Guest appearances
- Leslie Hope as Kira Meru; Marc Alaimo as Gul Dukat; David Bowe as Basso Tromac; Wayne Grace as Legate Parek; Tim deZarn as Halb Daier; Thomas Kopache - Kira Taban

Episode chronology
← Previous "Change of Heart"	Next → "Inquisition"
- Star Trek: Deep Space Nine season 6

"Wrongs Darker Than Death or Night" is the 141st episode of the science fiction television series Star Trek: Deep Space Nine, the 17th episode of the sixth season.

Set in the 24th century, the series takes place on Deep Space Nine, a fictional space station near the planet Bajor, as the Bajorans recover from a brutal decades-long occupation by the Cardassians. In this episode, Gul Dukat, the Cardassian former prefect of Bajor, tells Major Kira Nerys, a Bajoran, that her mother was once his lover, and Kira time-travels to the days of the occupation in order to find the truth.

== Production and development ==
"Wrongs Darker than Death or Night" aired in 1998 as the 17th episode of American science fiction television series Star Trek: Deep Space Nine's 6th season. Jonathan West directed the episode, and Ira Steven Behr and Hans Beimler wrote the screenplay. Leslie Hope guest-starred as Kira Meru. Marc Alaimo plays Dukat, and Thomas Kopache portrays Kira Taban. Other guest actors include David Bowe as Basso Tromac, and Wayne Grace as Legate Parek.

The title of the show was developed by Hans Beimler, and it was meant to contrast with prior titles. The phrase is in a passage in Prometheus Unbound by Percy Bysshe Shelley, a drama published in 1820.

To suffer woes which Hope thinks infinite;
To forgive wrongs darker than death or night;
To defy Power, which seems omnipotent;
To love, and bear; to hope till Hope creates

== Plot ==
On the 60th birthday of Kira Nerys's late mother Meru, whom Kira believes to have been a hero who died in a refugee camp, recurring Cardassian antagonist Dukat sends a message to Kira telling her that Meru was his lover. Kira obtains station commander Benjamin Sisko's permission to consult the Bajoran Orb of Time to find out the truth.

The Orb sends Kira into a vision of the past. Kira appears in a refugee center where her family once lived. There she befriends Meru, using the name "Luma Rahl". "Luma" and Meru are taken from the camp to become "comfort women" for Cardassian troops. On the space station Terok Nor—the future Deep Space Nine—Meru is overwhelmed by the bounty of food and other comforts. Dukat singles her out for special attention, and she eventually becomes Dukat's mistress. Nerys is thrown out into the station's Bajoran ghetto, where she is recruited by Halb, a member of the Bajoran resistance.

The next time Nerys sees her mother, Meru praises Dukat; Nerys angrily reminds her that Dukat is not only responsible for killing innocent Bajorans, but also for separating her from her family. Meru explains that Dukat has promised to provide her family with food and medical supplies. Nerys calls Meru a collaborator and storms out, hatching a plan with Halb to smuggle a bomb into Dukat's quarters. Meru could be killed in the blast, but Nerys no longer cares. Pretending to have had a change of heart, Nerys returns to Dukat's quarters to apologize to Meru, then secretly hides the bomb.

Nerys then sees Meru receive a message from her husband Taban. He thanks his wife for the resources her companionship to Dukat has afforded for their family: they have been released from the refugee camp, allowed to return home, and provided with extra food. Nerys, realizing that she owes her survival as a child to her mother, has a change of heart and warns Dukat and Meru about the bomb, and they escape just before it detonates.

The vision ends, and Kira returns to the present. She learns that her mother lived another seven years as Dukat's mistress, dying in a Cardassian hospital. The episode resolves ambivalently; Kira concludes that despite how outraged she feels at Meru's collaboration with the Cardassians, "no matter what she did, she was still my mother".

== Interpretation ==
Academics have commented on the episode's psychological meanings. "Wrongs Darker than Death or Night" is the final episode in what cultural geographer David Seitz called "the Kira parental grief trilogy", the other episodes in this informal trilogy being "Second Skin" and "Ties of Blood and Water", which focused on Kira's relationships to paternal figures, including her dead father Taban. In this trilogy, and in "Wrongs", Deep Space Nine depicts Kira as having a tremendous "capacity to empathize" by "integrat[ing] love and aggression", in Seitz's words: building on the theory of psychoanalyst Melanie Klein, Seitz argues that without forgiving Meru for her collaboration or forgetting her outrage at Cardassian colonial atrocities, Kira nevertheless "learns to live with ambivalence" and recognize that life involves complicated interrelationship. Psychologist Sherry Ginn argued that "Wrongs Darker than Death or Night" evokes the first stage of psychoanalyst Erik Erikson's stages of psychosocial development, trust and mistrust, as although Kira's "trust in the reality of her childhood is shaken", witnessing her mother go to great lengths to ensure Kira's survival justifies "the trust she developed with respect to her parents as a young child".

== Reception ==
This episode had Nielsen ratings of 4.6 when it was broadcast in 1998, which equates to about 4.5 million viewers. Tor.com gave the episode a 7 out of 10 rating. Comic Book Resources ranked "Wrongs Darker than Death or Night" as the 6th darkest Deep Space Nine episodes. In 2018, SyFy recommend this episode for its abbreviated watch guide for the Bajoran character Kira Nerys.

== Bibliography ==
- Ginn, Sherry (2022). "Trauma, Psychological Development, and the Triumph of Kira Nerys". In Ginn, Sherry; Cornelius, Michael G. (eds.). To Boldly Stay: Essays on Star Trek: Deep Space Nine. McFarland & Company. pp. 67–85. ISBN 978-1-4766-8540-3.
- Grech, Victor (October 2017). "Crime and Punishment in Star Trek: Genocide and War Crimes" (PDF). The New York Review of Science Fiction. Vol. 29, no. 7. pp. 1, 10–18.
- Hark, Ina Rae (2023). "Occupied Space: The Contested Habitation of Terok Nor/Deep Space Nine". In Hawkes, Joel; Christie, Alexander; Nienhuis, Tom (eds.). American Science Fiction Television and Space: Productions and (Re)configurations (1987–2021). Palgrave Macmillan. pp. 5–20. doi:10.1007/978-3-031-10528-9. ISBN 978-3-031-10527-2.
- Seitz, David K. (December 2017). "Second Skin, White Masks: Postcolonial Reparation in Star Trek: Deep Space Nine". Psychoanalysis, Culture & Society. 22 (4): 401–419. doi:10.1057/s41282-017-0043-2.
