= ITPM =

ITPM can stand for:

- In the Pale Moonlight
- IT portfolio management
