= List of games in Star Trek =

The fictional Star Trek universe includes a variety of sports, games, and other pastimes. Some of these fictional recreational activities are closely associated with one race, although they may have gained adherents from other backgrounds. Others thrive on the interaction of different species.

Some of the games below were central to the plot of a single episode, while others were recurring plot elements spanning multiple television series of the Star Trek franchise.

== Holodeck games ==
The holodeck is a facility designed to simulate reality by replicating a wide range of environments. It is commonly found on starships and starbases in the Star Trek series set in the 24th century, i.e. Star Trek: Voyager. While the holodeck is often used for research and training, it is frequently depicted as a source of entertainment.

Some programs depicted in the various Star Trek shows include a Klingon calisthenics program, used heavily by Lieutenant Commander Worf; a park-like setting where Riker first encounters Data in "Encounter at Farpoint"; various 'social' programs, such as a mud-bath and a pool hall; and Jean-Luc Picard's Dixon Hill holonovels.

In Voyager, Seven of Nine is often frustrated by Kathryn Janeway's superior skill at Velocity, a game played in a racquetball-like arena. In this game, players compete to be the first to capture and shoot a flying disc. Points are scored each time a player fails to capture the disc and is hit by it, with the game continuing until one player reaches ten points.

== Sports ==
=== Ice hockey ===
Tom Paris and Harry Kim are seen walking out of the holodeck with hockey skates slung over their shoulders. Paris warns Kim, "Watch out for those Nausicaans—they're tough.

=== Baseball ===
The Earth game baseball suffered from a decline in popularity that culminated in the final World Series, which was played in 2042 before a crowd of 300 and won by legendary player Buck Bokai. By the 24th century, the now-obscure game was appreciated by a relatively small number of aficionados including Benjamin Sisko, Jake Sisko, Kasidy Yates and astrophysicist Dr. Paul Stubbs. The only organized baseball mentioned is a six-team league on Cestus III. A Vulcan Starfleet crew formed a team under the leadership of their captain and challenged a team led by Captain Sisko in 2375.

=== Parrises Squares ===
Parrises Squares is a vigorous athletic game, mentioned in several episodes of Star Trek: The Next Generation and Voyager.

It is often implied that the game involves a high risk of serious personal injury; nevertheless, much to the concern of parents, the game was quite popular with teenagers during the 24th century. The game involves the use of a piece of equipment called an ion mallet and a ramp, and players often wear special padded uniforms.

When the Doctor created a holographic family for himself in 2373, his 'daughter' Belle was on her school's Parrises Squares team. This worried her 'parents', because Parrises Squares can be a dangerous game for someone her age. It later turned out their worries were justified, as she later 'died' from injuries sustained in Parrises Squares.

While in Starfleet Academy, Harry Kim played Parrises Squares, and was the Academy champion three times.

Parrises Squares is mainly mentioned as a game played by humans, but other species participate. M'Kota R'Cho was the first Klingon to play the game, participating in the Championship Finals of 2342.

=== Springball ===
Springball is a sport played by Bajorans and is somewhat similar to the human sport of handball. A game is shown during the Star Trek: Deep Space Nine episode "For the Cause."

=== Racquetball ===
Racquetball is a game played inside a room where the players use racquets to hit a small ball. In Star Trek: Deep Space Nine, Miles O'Brien and Julian Bashir enjoy the sport. Bashir was captain of the Starfleet Medical Academy racquetball team in 2368, when he led the team to victory in the sector championships.

=== Tennis ===
Tennis is clearly known and played in the Star Trek universe. In the Star Trek: The Next Generation episode "Suspicions", Guinan comes to Dr. Beverly Crusher complaining of tennis elbow. Later in the episode, the doctor gives Guinan a new, state-of-the-art tennis racket, which she is sure will alleviate her elbow problems. Guinan was lying about playing tennis, but nonetheless the game is clearly known by the both of them, and the racket is real.

In Star Trek: Deep Space Nine, Julian Bashir briefly considered becoming a professional tennis player (DS9, episode 173, "Melora"). It is revealed that he was good enough to play at professional level; however, he chose medicine as his profession.

=== Water polo ===
Captain Jonathan Archer from Star Trek: Enterprise had a passion for water polo, a sport he enjoyed playing during his time on Earth. In the episode "Catwalk," Archer is shown watching a water polo match on a portable viewing device as he tries to fall asleep. On several occasions, he is also seen bouncing a water polo ball off the wall in his quarters.

=== Basketball ===
In the Star Trek: Enterprise episode "The Forge", the bridge crew (except T'Pol) is briefly seen playing basketball.

=== Soccer/Football ===
In the Star Trek: Enterprise episode "Minefield", it is stated that England participated in the World Cup Final of 2152.

=== Darts ===
O'Brien and Bashir are frequently seen playing darts at Quark's bar in Deep Space Nine.

=== Volleyball ===
Harry Kim and Tom Paris are never seen playing, but in the episode "Warlord", Kim adds to an existing holodeck program three holographic characters he says he practices with—a championship team of three women. Paris remarks that now he knows why Kim has been playing better.

== Martial arts ==
=== Gladiatorial combat ===
In the Original Series episode "The Gamesters of Triskelion", Captain Kirk and some of his crew are forced to participate as gladiators in combat against other humanoids, for the entertainment of unseen masters who wager on the outcome in the arena.

=== Anbo-jitsu ===
Anbo-Jitsu (or anbo-jyutsu) is a fictitious Japanese sport shown in Star Trek: The Next Generation. In it, two armored opponents facing each other wear a solid visor, rendering them blind, and fight with a large staff. One end of the staff contains a proximity sensor, alerting each contender to their opponent's location with an audio signal. The other end of the staff is rounded and padded and used for direct blows. The staff itself can be used for sweeping attacks. The opponents dress in armor and helmets to protect them from injury. Ceremonial Japanese chants are used to greet the opponent, initiate combat and yield if necessary. It is called "the ultimate evolution in the martial arts" in the context of the show.

William Riker and his father settled a long-standing grudge with this game in the episode "The Icarus Factor".

=== Tsunkatse ===
Tsunkatse is a form of martial arts, similar to kickboxing and some Japanese sports. Each opponent wears a round device on both the front and back of their harness which sends the wearer a shock when it is touched by an opponent's counterpart, worn on the feet and hands. Each match is designated by a color code, red meaning to the death, blue meaning until one opponent is defeated.

The sport is practiced by various species in the Delta Quadrant. In the Voyager episode of the same name, Seven of Nine is kidnapped and forced to compete in the sport.

=== Fencing ===
Captain Jean-Luc Picard engages in fencing matches on at least two occasions. First, in the episode "We'll Always Have Paris", Picard is in a match against an unnamed crew member. Picard scores a touch, and then the match is cut short because of a strange time loop (which serves as the plot for the main story). Second, he matches against Guinan in the episode "I, Borg". Guinan feigns injury and Picard lowers his guard to help, at which time she strikes for an easy point. She does this to warn Picard against feeling sorry for the injured Borg that the crew has saved.

In a flashback scene in Star Trek: Picard, Picard is shown reading part of The Three Musketeers to a young Romulan boy, Elnor. He then teaches Elnor the basics of fencing, as depicted in the book. In the present time of the show, Elnor has become a skilled swordsman.

Hikaru Sulu in the original series is known to be a fencer, as demonstrated in the episode "The Naked Time". In the 2009 film, Sulu mentions he has combat training, which he later tells Kirk is "fencing." He carries a retractable sword during the space jump to the mining probe over Vulcan, and proves to be a formidable swordsman against his Romulan opponents.

== Games of chance ==
=== Chula ===
Chula is a game played by the Wadi race that places real people into a game who face a series of challenges based on dice rolls and decisions made by an outside player. Wagers are placed on the survival of the in-game players. It was the plot of the Deep Space Nine episode "Move Along Home". It would appear again as a major subplot in the Star Trek: Lower Decks episode "In the Cradle of Vexilon."

=== Dabo ===
Dabo (/ˈdɑːboʊ/ DAH-boh) is a Ferengi game of skill and chance. The game relies on the spinning of a "dabo wheel" similar to a roulette wheel. During various betting hands (similar to poker) each player either "buys" or "sells" or "converts" their gold-pressed latinum (money) in preparation for the next spin of the dabo wheel. About ten players can sit around the dabo wheel.

In the online role-playing game Star Trek Online, players can play a version of dabo with in-game currency. The wheel has three concentric rings that rotate independently; the players win based on how the symbols align after each spin.

==== Dabo girls ====
Dabo girls are women of various species who run the games in Ferengi establishments. Leeta (Chase Masterson), who was a dabo girl in Quark's bar, maintained that dabo girls not only had to look appealing enough to lure customers to play, but also be able to quickly calculate odds and ensure a house victory in the long run, typically by enticing gamers to stay until they lose.

The character therefore turns around the stereotype of the dumb blonde or bimbo; while dabo girls may be intentionally giving that impression to customers, they take advantage of those who view a dabo girl as no more than that. In the DS9 episode "The Abandoned", Jake Sisko's dabo girlfriend Mardah (Jill Sayre) was quoted as saying "The first rule of Dabo is watch the wheel, not the girl", and she makes a good impression on Benjamin Sisko during a private dinner he hosted for her and his son.

While the character Leeta made the role of dabo girl significant in Star Trek fandom, other dabo girls who appeared or were referred to in multiple episodes include Mardah and M'Pella (Cathy DeBuono). The sweet and hard working Aluura (Symba Smith), had a central role in the episode "Profit and Lace".

In the non-canon Star Trek novel series Mission Gamma, one of Quark's dabo girls hires Hetik, an Orion male, as the first ever dabo boy in the game's history. Quark is initially dubious about the introduction of a dabo boy, but Hetik soon becomes popular among female patrons.

=== Tongo ===
Tongo is a card game played predominantly by the Ferengi. The game centers around a roulette-type wheel with an elevated pot in the middle. On each turn the wheel is spun, and the player has the choice to "evade", "confront", "acquire", or "retreat". Each choice has its purchase price, sell price, and its risk, all of which are interrelated.

A Global Tongo Championship is held each year on Ferenginar.

=== Poker ===
Poker is a card game played on many TNG episodes. The crew of the Enterprise (NCC 1701-D) plays dealer's choice, usually five-card stud, which is one of the more rare variants of poker by 20th and 21st century standards. Draws have also been picked as well as an unknown variation on 5 card stud, as well as 7 card stud. William Riker, a highly skilled player, hosts regular games for the senior officers; in the series finale "All Good Things...", Jean-Luc Picard joins in for the first time.

=== Fizzbin ===
Fizzbin is a fictional card game created by James T. Kirk in the Original Series episode "A Piece of the Action". While being held hostage on Sigma Iota II with Spock and Leonard McCoy, he spontaneously invents the game to distract the henchmen guarding them.

The rules are intentionally complex. Each player gets six cards, except for the player on the dealer's right, who gets seven. Simultaneously, the first and second card are turned up, except on Tuesdays, when the first card alone is turned up. Kirk deals the henchman two like cards (jacks), which are a "half-fizzbin". When the henchman states that he needs another jack, Kirk warns that a third jack is a "shralk" and is grounds for disqualification. With a half-fizzbin, one wants a king and a deuce, except at night, when one wants a queen and a four.

At this point, Kirk deals a third jack. To keep the ruse going, he ignored the disqualification rule he had just made up. He explained that, had a king been dealt instead of a jack, the player would get another card, except when it is dark, in which case he would have to give it back. The top hand is a "royal fizzbin", consisting of a king, a two, a jack, a six, two queens and two aces during the day, and a queen, a four, an ace, an eight, two kings, and two jacks at night; however, the odds against getting one are extremely high. He asked Spock what the odds of such a thing were, to which Spock replied that he had never calculated them.

Kirk called the last card a "kronk", which is two like cards and either a king, queen, jack, ace, two, four, six, or eight (time of day applicable), and then purposely dealt a card such that it fell on the floor.

In the Deep Space Nine episode "The Ascent", Quark mentioned the game as a way for him and Odo to while away the time while traveling on a runabout; whether it had become a real game or if it had been a reference was not explained. Playable versions of the game have been invented, and it featured in the episode "Nantucket Sleighride" of the animated series Starcom.

== Games of strategy and logic ==
=== Dom-jot ===
Dom-jot was featured in the episode "Tapestry". It appears to be a futuristic version of bumper pool. Jean-Luc Picard (as a Starfleet cadet) was stabbed in the heart by a Nausicaan after a fight that ensued because his friend rigged a Dom-jot table to thwart a cheating Nausicaan. In the DS9 episode "The Abandoned", Jake's girlfriend, a dabo girl, informs Benjamin Sisko that the boy is a skilled hustler at the Dom-jot table.

=== Kadis-kot ===
Kadis-kot is a board game played on a six-sided board with three sets of colored tiles: red, green, and orange. Visually, the game appears to be a variant of Reversi. It appears to be a game of logic and strategy for 2 players, but as many as 5 players have been shown playing together.

=== Kal-toh ===
Kal-Toh (kal-toe) is a Vulcan game of logic. According to Tuvok, "Kal-Toh is to chess as chess is to Tic-Tac-Toe". Its goal, according to him, "[i]s not about striving for balance [but] about finding the seeds of order even in the midst of profound chaos." It first appeared on Star Trek: Voyager, often played by Tuvok and a partner.

The game itself involves a large number of small gray holographic rods called t'an, generated from a platform below. They are arranged in a specific manner, which eventually produces the shape of two nested icosidodecahedra connected by the center points of their edges. Kal-Toh can be played singly or against an opponent, each taking a turn to place a piece.

=== Kotra ===
Kotra is a Cardassian board game, seen played only once in the entire franchise, in the Star Trek: Deep Space Nine episode "Empok Nor". It is shown on the table in the Star Trek: Deep Space Nine episode "Wrongs Darker than Death or Night".

=== Strategema ===
Strategema is a game central to the episode "Peak Performance" of Star Trek: The Next Generation.

Strategema is a strategy game played on a holographic board. The object of Strategema is to manipulate circular icons to gain control of your opponent's territory while defending your own.

Strategema is generally played on a specially designed computer. Both players sit at the computer-controlled Strategema table, facing each other, with the board continuously rotating in the middle. The game is controlled with metal thimbles placed on the players' fingers. Electronics in these thimbles then calculate the movement of the fingers and send the information to the computer.

The duration of a Strategema game depends on the competence of the players. Generally, games last only a hundred moves at most. However, experienced master players can achieve games of well over a thousand moves.

=== "The Game" ===
In the Star Trek: The Next Generation episode "The Game", an undesignated virtual reality game was introduced to the crew of the Enterprise in which players wore an optical headset and used mental commands to manipulate holographic funnels to catch virtual disks. The Game was eventually revealed to be deliberately addictive, stimulating the pleasure centers of the players' brains, and was designed by aliens called the Ktarians, as a stratagem to take control of the Enterprise.

=== Tri-dimensional chess ===
The game of tri-dimensional chess (tri-d chess) can be seen in many Star Trek episodes and films, most notably played by Spock against James T. Kirk or Leonard McCoy on the Original Series.

Rules for the game were never explained within the series; in fact, the boards are sometimes not even aligned consistently from one shot to the next within a single episode. The Tri-D chessboard set was made popular by its inclusion in The Star Trek Star Fleet Technical Manual by Franz Joseph, who invented starting positions for the playing pieces and short additional rules. With his approval, Andrew Bartmess first developed the Standard Rules in 1976.

=== Go ===
Go can be seen on Star Trek: Enterprise, in the episode "Cogenitor".

=== Terrace ===
Terrace is a board game introduced in 1992, and was subsequently featured on Star Trek: The Next Generation as a permanent prop.

=== Durotta ===
Durotta is a board game played by Paris and Torres in the Star Trek: Voyager episode "Night".

The props used were from the real world game Quarto.

=== Pair Match ===
Pair Match, manufactured by Bandai in 1984, appeared in several Star Trek: The Next Generation episodes.

== See also ==
- History of Star Trek games
