= A Simple Investigation =

- Star Trek: Deep Space Nine episode
- Episode no.: Season 5 Episode 17
- Directed by: John T. Kretchmer
- Written by: René Echevarria
- Production code: 515
- Original air date: March 31, 1997

Guest appearances
- Dey Young as Arissa; John Durbin as Traidy; Nicholas Worth as Sorm; Randy Mulkey as Idanian

Episode chronology
← Previous "Doctor Bashir, I Presume?"	Next → "Business as Usual"
- Star Trek: Deep Space Nine season 5

"A Simple Investigation" is the 115th episode of the television series Star Trek: Deep Space Nine, the 17th episode of the fifth season. Actress Dey Young guest stars as the mysterious stranger Arissa.

Set in the 24th century, the series follows the adventures of the crew of the Starfleet-managed Bajoran space station Deep Space Nine. In this episode, Odo becomes romantically involved with Arissa while helping her deal with the Orion Syndicate.

More than five million viewers were estimated to have watched "A Simple Investigation" when it premiered.

== Plot ==
In Quark's, Odo meets a beautiful woman named Arissa and is impressed by her powers of observation. Later, he is surprised when the same woman is arrested for trying to break into the station's computer. Odo questions her about the man she was waiting for in Quark's — an Idanian named Tauvid Rem. Arissa tells Odo that Tauvid has information about the daughter she gave up fifteen years before. Odo takes her to Tauvid's quarters, where they discover he has been killed.

Soon afterward, Odo catches Arissa retrieving a datacrystal Tauvid hid. She admits to Odo that she doesn't really have a daughter, and tells him that she came to meet Tauvid because she wants to escape working for the Orion Syndicate — a notorious criminal organization. Her boss, a man named Draim, probably had Tauvid killed to keep her from getting the unknown information contained in the crystal.

Odo hides Arissa in his quarters as he begins an investigation, while Dax and O'Brien attempt to access the heavily protected datacrystal. Arissa tells Odo how she began to work for Draim, only to want out when she learned the deadly consequences her assignments meant for others. Odo encourages her to testify against Draim and take back her life. That night, he returns to his quarters, where the two of them give in to their growing attraction to each other.

After spending a passionate night with Odo, Arissa sends a message to Draim proposing an exchange — the crystal for her life. Draim agrees, but instructs his hit men, Traidy and Sorm, to kill her after the crystal is retrieved. Meanwhile, an Idanian official arrives, informing Odo that Arissa is not who she appears to be, but actually an Idanian agent given a new identity in order to infiltrate Draim's organization. Even Arissa does not know this, since her memory has been erased. The crystal contains all of her real memories. The Idanian asks to be taken to Arissa, and Odo quickly complies — only to find both the woman and the crystal missing.

Arissa prepares to give Traidy the crystal in exchange for her life. But just as he and Sorm are to kill her, Odo and the Idanian save Arissa. Later, her memories and true appearance are restored. She and Odo then meet one last, painful time, after which Arissa returns to her married life — and Odo is left broken-hearted.

== Production ==
Guest star Dey Young previously appeared in the Star Trek: The Next Generation episode "The Masterpiece Society" and would later appear in the Star Trek: Enterprise episode "Two Days and Two Nights". John Durbin previously appeared in the Star Trek: The Next Generation episode "Chain of Command" as the Cardassian Gul Lemec.

Auberjonois enjoyed working with Director John Kretchmer and appreciated that the scenes were relatively long for an hour of episodic television. He praised his co-star saying that "Dey Young was terrific" and told his wife that he had a crush on Young. The script described the love scene as Odo morphing around Arissa and her becoming a shimmering figure, but the scene was never realized. Not because the effect would have been too expensive, but because executive producer Ira Stephen Behr said that "no one could convince me it was going to look as beautiful as I imagined" and he did not want to risk it looking awful.

== Reception ==
Tor.com gave it five out of ten. Zack Handlen of The A.V. Club found the romantic premise of the story compelling, but said it was "hamstrung by a tepid guest star and a story that understands its clichés without embracing them enough to transcend them." He thought that the episode would have worked better in earlier seasons, but that it lacked "the larger implications or complexity we've come to expect." Cinefantastique magazine rated it 2.5 out of 5, and wrote: "Odo finally meets someone who can recognize the needy, caring person under his gruff exterior. This episodic television, and of course Odo doesn't get to keep this relationship but the experience has changed him."
