= Doctor Bashir, I Presume? =

- Star Trek: Deep Space Nine episode
- Episode no.: Season 5 Episode 16
- Directed by: David Livingston
- Story by: Jimmy Diggs
- Teleplay by: Ronald D. Moore
- Cinematography by: Jonathan West
- Production code: 514
- Original air date: February 24, 1997

Guest appearances
- Brian George as Richard Bashir; Max Grodénchik as Rom; Chase Masterson as Leeta; Fadwa El Guindi as Amsha Bashir; J. Patrick McCormack as Adm. Bennett; Robert Picardo as Dr. Lewis Zimmerman

Episode chronology
← Previous "By Inferno's Light"	Next → "A Simple Investigation"
- Star Trek: Deep Space Nine season 5

"Doctor Bashir, I Presume?" is the 114th episode of the syndicated American science fiction television series Star Trek: Deep Space Nine, the 16th episode of the fifth season. This episode guest stars actor Robert Picardo, who played the role of the Emergency Medical Hologram on Star Trek: Voyager; in this episode, Picardo portrays both its creator, Dr. Lewis Zimmerman, and briefly the EMH itself. The episode also features guest performances by Brian George and anthropologist Fadwa El Guindi as the parents of Dr. Julian Bashir.

Set in the 24th century, the series follows the adventures of the crew of the Starfleet-managed Bajoran space station Deep Space Nine. In this episode, Dr. Lewis Zimmerman comes to DS9 to create a medical hologram based on Dr. Bashir, leading to the revelation that Bashir was genetically modified as a child.

The episode's title refers to the famous quotation attributed to Henry Morton Stanley on encountering the medical missionary and explorer, Doctor Livingstone.

== Plot ==
Hologram engineer Lewis Zimmerman comes to Deep Space Nine to use Dr. Bashir's likeness as the template for a holographic program designed to provide medical treatment. To make the program as robust as possible, Zimmerman needs a personality profile on Julian. Against Julian's wishes, Zimmerman invites his estranged parents, Amsha and Richard Bashir, to the station to be interviewed. Julian implores his parents not to reveal to Zimmerman anything about a secret from his childhood.

Julian's parents go to the infirmary to try to assuage their son's fears, stating emphatically that they will not tell Zimmerman that they had Julian illegally genetically modified when he was a child. However, they are unaware that they are speaking to Zimmerman's new hologram rather than to their son. Zimmerman and Chief O'Brien overhear their words.

O'Brien informs Julian of what he heard. Julian confirms that he was genetically modified. He was a poor student, potentially had a learning disability, and was below average in height and weight. Shortly before his seventh birthday, his parents sent him to a clinic for a series of genetic enhancements that improved his physical and mental abilities. When he was fifteen, he learned what had been done to him and stopped using his birth name, Jules. With Zimmerman about to report his discovery to Starfleet, Julian sees no alternative but to resign, as their regulations bar genetically enhanced individuals from serving or holding a licence to practice medicine.

Julian accuses his parents of giving up on his original self, but they tell him that they put him through the treatments out of love for him and worry over seeing him struggle. Before he can tender his resignation, his parents tell Captain Sisko everything and make a deal with the Judge Advocate General of Starfleet. Richard will plead guilty to illegal genetic engineering and serve a two-year sentence at a minimum-security prison, while Julian will be allowed to retain his commission and medical license. Grateful for his father's sacrifice, Julian makes some peace with his parents before they depart for Earth.

Meanwhile, Zimmerman pursues the affections of Julian's ex-girlfriend Leeta, asking her to accompany him back to Jupiter Station. Shy Rom is too scared to say anything to convince her to stay, although Leeta would welcome any reason to stay with him. She is on the verge of leaving with Zimmerman when Rom tells her that he loves her. Touched, she remains on the station. Zimmerman concedes to true love, then immediately tries to chat up one of his fellow passengers.

== Production ==
The episode began as a way to bring actor Robert Picardo and his character the Emergency Medical Hologram to Deep Space Nine.

Amsha Bashir is portrayed by Fadwa El Guindi, an anthropologist with no previous screen acting experience, at the time a professor at UCLA. She was invited to audition for the role by Ron Surma, who saw her community theatre performance in Mahjar, a play she co-wrote and co-directed.

== Reception ==
Keith DeCandido of Tor.com rated the episode seven out of ten. Cinefantastique gave it 2.5 out of 5.

In 2012, Den of Geek ranked this the ninth best episode of Star Trek: Deep Space Nine.
