= Antican =

Antican may refer to:

- Antican (Star Trek), a fictional race in the Star Trek series
- Antican, a fictional race in the video game Final Fantasy XI
