= John Durbin =

American actor

John Durbin is an American actor. He is best known for playing Gul Lemec in the Star Trek: The Next Generation 2-part episode "Chain of Command".

== Filmography ==
- Take Out (2005) ... as Hershel Kammer
- Sabrina, the Teenage Witch
  - episode I Fall to Pieces ... as Ed
- Angel
  - episode "Quickening" ... as Dr. Fetvanovich
- The Breed (2001) ... as Boudreaux
- Star Trek: Voyager
  - episode Critical Care ... as Alien Miner
- The Huntress
  - episode Scattered ... as Thin Man
- Tully (2000) ... as Marshall
- Providence
  - episode The Kiss ... as Shopkeeper
- Ride with the Devil (1999) ... as Skaggs
- Dead Dogs (1999) ... as Gordon
- A Will of Their Own (1998) ... as Sweatshop Foreman
- Executive Power (1997) ... as Mr. Shank
- The Shining ... as Horace 'Harry' Derwent
- A Deadly Vision (1997) ... as Music store clerk
- Star Trek: Deep Space Nine
  - episode A Simple Investigation ... as Traidy
- Kansas City (1996) ... as Gas Station Attendant
- Gone in the Night (1996) ... as Psychic
- Melrose Place
  - episode Dial M for Melrose ... as Mark Paul
  - episode Let the Games Begin ... as Mark Paul
- Truman (1995) ... as Producer
- Witch Hunt (1994) ... as Brackett
- Mr. Jones (1993) ... as Patient
- And the Band Played On (1993) ... as 6th Man
- King of the Hill (1993) ... as Mr. Sandoz, Artist
- Heart and Souls (1993) ... as Stage Manager
- Perry Mason: The Case of the Telltale Talk Show Host (1993) ... as Armstrong
- I Can Make You Love Me (1993) ... as Lawrence Kane
- Cyborg 2 (1993) ... as Tech #1 - Observation Room
- Star Trek: The Next Generation
  - episode Chain of Command: Part 2 ... as Gul Lemec
  - episode Chain of Command: Part 1 ... as Gul Lemec
  - episode Lonely Among Us ... as Ssestar
- The Burden of Proof (1992) ... as Remo
- O Pioneers! (1992) ... as Father Duchesne
- Dollman (1991) ... as Fisher
- The Killing Mind (1991)
- Ain't No Way Back (1990) ... as Zebediah Campbell
- Checking Out (1989) ... as Spencer Gillinger
- Mutant on the Bounty (1989) ... as Manny
- Brothers in Arms (1989) ... as Henry
- Dr. Caligari (1989) ... as Gus Pratt
- Dead Solid Perfect (1988) ... as Man
- Tricks of the Trade (1988)
- Demonwarp (1988) ... as Minister
- Dead Man Walking (1988) ... as Bartender
- Tapeheads (1988) ... as Hitman #3
- Max Headroom
  - episode Lessons ... as Dragul
- The Blue Iguana ... as Louie Sparks
- Hooperman
  - episode Aria da Capo
- Number One with a Bullet ... as Transvestite
- Crime Story
  - episode The Pinnacle ... as Accountant
- Hunter
  - episode The Contract ... as Kirschbaum
- The A-Team
  - episode Firing Line
  - episode Dishpan Man ... as Ramon Soulay
- Annihilator (1986) ... as Trucker
- Moonlighting
  - episode North by North DiPesto
- The Return of the Living Dead ... as Radio Corpse #1
