= Antica =

Antica may refer to:

- Ostia Antica, an archaeological site that is the location of the harbour city of ancient Rome
- Via Appia Antica (Appian Way), one of the earliest and strategically most important Roman roads of the ancient republic
- Carpano Antica Formula, a brand of sweet vermouth
- A fictional location in the Star Trek episode Lonely Among Us
