= Inquisition (Star Trek: Deep Space Nine) =

- Star Trek: Deep Space Nine episode
- Episode no.: Season 6 Episode 18
- Directed by: Michael Dorn
- Written by: Bradley Thompson; David Weddle
- Production code: 542
- Original air date: April 6, 1998

Guest appearances
- William Sadler as Luther Sloan; Jeffrey Combs as Weyoun; Samantha Mudd as Chandler; Benjamin Brown as Kagan

Episode chronology
← Previous "Wrongs Darker Than Death or Night"	Next → "In the Pale Moonlight"
- Star Trek: Deep Space Nine season 6

"Inquisition" is the 142nd episode of the television series Star Trek: Deep Space Nine. It is the 18th episode of the sixth season. This episode introduces Starfleet's secretive intelligence agency, Section 31, which would go on to be featured in future Star Trek television series and films.

Set in the 24th century, Deep Space Nine follows the adventures of the crew of the fictional space station Deep Space Nine, which lies adjacent to a wormhole connecting the Alpha and Gamma Quadrants of the galaxy. The later seasons of the series follow a war between the United Federation of Planets and the Dominion, a hostile empire from the Gamma Quadrant. In this episode, Deep Space Nine's chief medical officer Dr. Julian Bashir is accused of being a spy for the Dominion; the accusations turn out to be a tool to recruit Bashir to join Section 31.

"Inquisition" is one of several espionage stories featured in the later seasons of Deep Space Nine, stemming from a desire to add greater moral ambiguity to the fictional universe of Star Trek.

== Plot ==
One evening, Dr. Bashir treats Chief O'Brien's dislocated shoulder. The next morning, Deep Space Nine is visited by Luther Sloan, an agent from Starfleet Internal Affairs. Sloan suspects that one of DS9's senior staff is a Dominion spy; he confines them to quarters and tells them to await interrogation. At Bashir's interview, Sloan treats him cordially while asking a few light questions. Later, O'Brien tells Bashir that his own interrogation with Sloan lasted hours and focused on Bashir.

Bashir is brought back to the now hostile Sloan, who points out events from Bashir's past that seem to indicate disloyalty or dishonesty. Sloan proposes that, when Bashir was imprisoned by the Dominion the previous year, he was persuaded to become a Dominion spy but repressed his memories of the choice, allowing him to believe he was a loyal Starfleet officer. Bashir refuses to accept Sloan's theory, but Sloan has him detained. Captain Sisko attends Bashir's next interrogation, pointing out holes in Sloan's arguments, but privately suggests to Bashir that Sloan's theories are plausible.

The next day, Bashir is beamed to a Dominion ship, where he is greeted warmly by the Dominion representative Weyoun. Weyoun tells Bashir he made a moral choice to help the Dominion in order to end the war quickly. Bashir, wondering why Weyoun and Sloan are trying to convince him of the same thing, concludes that Sloan is the traitor.

Bashir is rescued by the DS9 crew, but they refuse to listen to his claim of innocence. Desperate, Bashir grabs O'Brien, who pulls his arm away. Bashir, suspicious that O'Brien's injury has apparently already healed, tricks him into revealing he is unaware of the cause of the injury. Bashir realizes he has been in a holodeck simulation since the previous morning.

Sloan ends the simulation and informs Bashir that his loyalty was being tested. Sloan explains that he is a member of Section 31, a secretive autonomous intelligence agency. Bashir questions the legality and ethics of the operation, but Sloan justifies their actions as necessary to protect the Federation. He attempts to recruit Bashir, but Bashir refuses and threatens to expose them.

On DS9, Sisko reports that Starfleet Command neither confirms nor denies Section 31's existence. He predicts that Sloan will try to recruit Bashir again, and orders him to accept, so they can learn more.

== Reception ==
On first broadcast, the episode received Nielsen ratings of 4.7 points corresponding to about 4.6 million viewers.

In 2015, Geek.com recommended this episode as "essential watching" for their abbreviated Star Trek: Deep Space Nine binge-watching guide.

Writing for Tor.com, Keith DeCandido described William Sadler's performance as Sloan as "magnificent". Jammer's Reviews called the episode "...a mysterious, intriguing look at the 'other side' of Starfleet" and compared it to the fourth season's episodes "Homefront" and "Paradise Lost".

In 2016, The Hollywood Reporter ranked "Inquisition" as the 12th best of Star Trek: Deep Space Nine. They rated the episode the 49th best episode of all Star Trek episodes to-date.

In 2018, Nerdist ranked this episode the 12th most essential episode of the series.
