= Change of Heart (Star Trek: Deep Space Nine) =

- Star Trek: Deep Space Nine episode
- Episode no.: Season 6 Episode 16
- Directed by: David Livingston
- Written by: Ronald D. Moore
- Production code: 540
- Original air date: March 2, 1998

Guest appearance
- Todd Waring as Lasaran

Episode chronology
← Previous "Honor Among Thieves"	Next → "Wrongs Darker Than Death or Night"
- Star Trek: Deep Space Nine season 6

"Change of Heart" is the 16th episode of the sixth season of Star Trek: Deep Space Nine, the 140th episode overall. The episode was written by Ronald D. Moore and directed by David Livingston; it aired in broadcast syndication the week of February 28, 1998.

Set in the 24th century, the series follows the adventures of the crew of the fictional space station Deep Space Nine; in the later seasons of the show, the station is of strategic importance in a war against a hostile empire known as the Dominion, which has already absorbed the nearby planet of Cardassia. In this episode, newlywed DS9 crew members Jadzia Dax and Worf are sent on a mission to rendezvous with a Cardassian defector. Dax is wounded, and Worf has to make the choice between saving his wife or completing his mission. It is the first episode since their wedding to focus on them, and explores spousal relationships and duty to the service.

This episode had a Nielsen rating of 5.5 points, corresponding to about 5.4 million viewers when it premiered.

== Plot ==
Dax and Worf are sent to meet with Lasaran, a Cardassian double-agent who wishes to defect to the Federation. Lasaran has valuable military intelligence, but will share no information until he is extracted by Dax and Worf. In three days, he plans to walk into the jungle on the planet Soukara; seeing no alternative, they agree to rendezvous with him there.

Once Dax and Worf land their runabout on Soukara, they have two days to reach the rendezvous point. They must trek through 20 kilometers of dense jungle, and will have to evade the Dominion's surveillance and patrols. They hike the entire day, finally stopping to make camp after night falls. Despite the difficulty of the journey, it is almost like a honeymoon for the newlyweds, who enjoy talking and joking together. However, they soon realize they are in the path of a patrol of Jem'Hadar, the Dominion's soldiers. They manage to kill all three Jem'Hadar, but Dax is shot with a disruptor that leaves an anti-coagulant in her wound — meaning the bleeding cannot be stopped.

With the help of painkillers and regular plasma transfusions, they continue their trek, but Dax's injuries impede their progress, and eventually she loses the ability to walk. Since they cannot abandon their mission, Dax and Worf agree Worf must keep going, leaving Dax behind to die. The newlyweds share a kiss goodbye, and Worf heads off into the jungle. But as he gets farther away, Worf realizes he cannot complete the mission. Instead, he rushes back to the now-unconscious Dax, reaching her just in time to save her life.

Back on Deep Space Nine, he learns she will recover, but their mission is a complete loss: Lasaran has been killed. Captain Sisko informs Worf that, as captain, he must issue a formal reprimand, lessening the possibility of Worf ever getting his own command, and prohibit any further missions with Worf and Dax as a team—but as a man and a husband, he would have done the same thing.

In a side plot, Miles O'Brien tries to coach Julian Bashir to win a game of Tongo, a Ferengi gambling game, and break Quark's winning streak; Quark wins by reminding Bashir of his former infatuation with Dax, leaving him too distracted and glum to focus on the game.

== Writing ==
The episode's B-plot was originally going to be a "low-brow comedy" centered on the Ferengi characters Nog and Rom, featuring a visit by Rom's ex-wife, Nog's mother, to Deep Space Nine. Livingston felt this storyline would be "hilarious" and contrast with the high-tragedy plot; however, the showrunner, Ira Steven Behr, disliked the concept, and Livingston replaced it with the Tongo subplot. Moore deliberately had the Tongo subplot end relatively early in the episode so as not to distract from the serious drama of Worf and Dax.

By the time this episode was made, actress Terry Farrell, who played Jadzia Dax, had already declined to renew her contract, meaning the character of Jadzia would have to be killed off by the end of the sixth season. Farrell suggested having Jadzia die in this episode, with Worf completing the mission, but in the end, Jadzia survived the episode and died in the season finale, "Tears of the Prophets".

== Production ==
This episode includes a sequence that depicts a runabout traversing an asteroid field, then landing on a planet. This was the first episode in which runabout sequences were done completely with computer-generated imagery: complex scenes where the ship weaved through the dense asteroid field were achieved without weeks of miniature effect work, and camera movements during the landing sequence allowed the runabout to be shown from multiple angles in the same scene, as there was no need to conceal a 'mounting point' for the miniature. The CGI model for the Danube class was developed by Digital Muse.

The effects coordinator for the episode was Adam Buckner.

== Reception ==
In 2017, ScreenRant rated "Change of Heart" the 4th best romantic episode of Star Trek.

In 2018, SyFy included this episode on their Jadzia Dax binge-watching guide for this character.
