= Conflict of Interest (film) =

- Directed by: Gary Davis
- Written by: Gregory Miller; Michael Angeli
- Produced by: Tony Amatullo
- Starring: Christopher McDonald; Judd Nelson; Alyssa Milano
- Cinematography: Bryan England
- Edited by: Marcus Manton
- Distributed by: Moviestore Entertainment; HBO
- Release date: March 4, 1993
- Running time: 88 minutes
- Country: United States
- Language: English

Conflict of Interest is a 1993 independent crime action film directed by Gary Davis.

== Plot ==
In Los Angeles, Mickey Flannery's wife Patty is killed in front of their young son, Jason. Seven years later, he returns to his job at the police department in homicide, working under Captain Garland. He has investigated a car ring deal, but the captain has no interest in it, because it has no connection to homicide. Mickey is in a relationship with Vera and looks forward to meeting with his son after years apart. Jason has grown up with his grandparents, and is not enthusiastic to reunite with his father. While joining him on lunch, Mickey is startled when he hears gunshots after two cars drive by. Car repair shop and heavy metal club owner Gideon and his muscled companion Casey are the killers, who shot Trasher in cold blood.

Jason catches the eye of Eve, a tough heavy metal girl who takes Jason to Gideon's heavy metal club, where she reveals herself to be his girlfriend, even though she is in high school. After being introduced to Gideon and Casey, he goes home with Gloria, a club co-worker whom he has sex with. Back at home, he confronts his father with having abandoned him, though Mickey explains that he could not take care of him because he was mourning and became an alcoholic - without a job. Mickey is called to the job to investigate the death of Gloria. He finds a letter signed by Jason in her room, and realizes that his son is involved and hides this piece of evidence from his colleagues. He rushes to San Pedro High School to get an explanation from his son, but Gideon interrupts them, warning Mickey to leave "his friend" alone. Gideon then offers Jason a job as a sound engineer in his club, which Jason accepts. As Gideon drives off, Mickey recognizes his car as the same one that drove off after the killing of Trasher.

Mickey follows Gideon to his home and, after cuffing him, confronts him with the murder as well as warning him to stay away from his son. He is interrupted by his captain, who lashes out at Mickey for breaking the police rules by having visited Gideon on his own, and informs him that Gideon has an alibi for the night that Gloria was murdered. Gideon, in fact, has provided an alibi for every worker in the club, and sends Shannon to pleasure Jason, in order to distract him from thinking that he might look suspicious. Gideon notices that Eve does not like this, for she has become infatuated with Jason. Jason blacks out during sex with Shannon and later finds her shot to death. As Mickey arrives, Gideon shows him Shannon's body and informs him that his son is responsible. When a report is made of Shannon's death, the captain becomes suspicious and infuriated when he learns from Gideon that Mickey showed up at the scene of the crime only moments after her death, prompting him to think that Jason killed both women: Mickey is fired on the spot.

Jason remembers that Gideon shot Shannon and is trying to frame him. He convinces Eve that they should get out as soon as possible, but are stopped by Gideon's men. With the help from his old friend Ray Dureen and colleague Oakes, Mickey steps outside the book to prove that Gideon is framing his son. He suspects that Detective Falcone, who has been harassing Mickey whenever he exclaimed suspicion of Gideon, might have something to do with the entire ring, and decides to follow him. Falcone drives to Gideon's place at the dock, where he is planning on finishing off Jason and Eve. After rescuing them, Mickey is captured by one of Gideon's men. He witnesses Gideon using his gun to kill Falcone and then prepares to kill him, when Jason comes to the rescue. After killing Gideon in an explosion, Mickey finds out that Ray was involved with the car deal ring and Ray admits that he had Patty killed because she found out about his criminal activities. Mickey considers killing Ray, but, encouraged by Jason, turns him in to the police.

== Cast ==
- Christopher McDonald as Mickey Flannery
- Judd Nelson as Charles "Gideon" Morningside
- Alyssa Milano as Eve
- Zia Harris as Jason Flannery
- Lee de Broux as Ray Dureen
- Jay Acovone as Detective Bob Falcone
- Clifton Powell as Detective Oakes
- Harrison Page as Captain Garland
- Dey Young as Vera
- Cole Stevens as Casey
- Kelli Brook as Gloria
- Lynette Howe as Shannon
- Heather Elizabeth Parkhurst as Francesca
- Vincent Klyn as Mueller
- Tabby Hanson as Patty Flannery
- Joey Katz as Young Jason Flannery
- Alex Chapman as Trasher

== Production ==
The film was shot between July 9 and August 5, 1992.
