= Ties of Blood and Water =

- Star Trek: Deep Space Nine episode
- Episode no.: Season 5 Episode 19
- Directed by: Avery Brooks
- Story by: Edmund Newton; Robbin L. Slocum
- Teleplay by: Robert Hewitt Wolfe
- Cinematography by: Jonathan West
- Production code: 517
- Original air date: April 14, 1997

Guest appearances
- Lawrence Pressman as Tekeny Ghemor; Marc Alaimo as Gul Dukat; Thomas Kopache as Taban; William Lucking as Furel; Jeffrey Combs as Weyoun

Episode chronology
← Previous "Business as Usual"	Next → "Ferengi Love Songs"
- Star Trek: Deep Space Nine season 5

"Ties of Blood and Water" is an episode of the syndicated American science fiction television series Star Trek: Deep Space Nine, the nineteenth episode of the fifth season.

Set in the 24th century, the series follows the adventures of the crew of the space station Deep Space Nine near the planet Bajor, as the Bajorans recover from a decades-long occupation by the imperialistic Cardassians. The station is adjacent to a wormhole connecting Bajor to the distant Gamma Quadrant, which is home to an empire known as the Dominion; in the fifth season, the Dominion annexes Cardassia, fomenting new conflict with the United Federation of Planets. In this episode, the Bajoran Major Kira Nerys (Nana Visitor) copes with her feelings about the impending death of Tekeny Ghemor (Lawrence Pressman), a Cardassian dissident she has become close to, while Cardassia's new Dominion government attempts to co-opt his legacy.

== Plot ==
Tekeny Ghemor, the Cardassian who Kira befriended when she was kidnapped by the Obsidian Order to expose him as a dissident, arrives on Deep Space Nine. Kira hopes he will be the face of the resistance against the Dominion-controlled puppet government of Cardassia, but he tells her that he is dying. He wishes to participate in the ritual of shri-tal, a Cardassian tradition in which a dying person reveals their secrets to the rest of the family for use against their enemies. He chooses Kira to interview him, since he regards her as family. Captain Sisko (Avery Brooks) encourages her to participate, as Ghemor's information could greatly aid the Federation and Bajor. Kira is hesitant at first, remembering the injuries that her father suffered at the Cardassians' hands during the occupation of Bajor. However, she agrees to hear Ghemor's secrets and use them for good.

Gul Dukat (Marc Alaimo), the head of Cardassia's Dominion government, requests Ghemor's extradition to Cardassia, but Sisko brusquely rebuffs him, citing the Federation neither recognises his government's legitimacy nor has an extradition treaty with Cardassia. Refusing to take no for an answer, Dukat and his Dominion liaison Weyoun visit the station, intent on taking Ghemor with them. Dukat first offers to reunite Ghemor with his long-lost daughter, and then gives Kira information implying Ghemor participated in a massacre of Bajoran civilians during the Cardassian occupation. Finally, he delivers a bottle of poisoned liquor to Ghemor's quarters, but Sisko intercepts it.

Kira becomes furious at Ghemor for hiding his past from her and spends as little time caring for him as possible. However, she later learns from security chief Odo that Ghemor was only nineteen at the time of the massacre, an inexperienced foot soldier, and there is no evidence he killed anyone there. Kira recalls that when her own father was badly injured, she chose to participate in a counterattack rather than stay with him, and missed his death by minutes. Realizing that she used the counterattack because she couldn't bear to watch her father die, she decides not to make the same mistake with Ghemor. She returns to his bedside and stays until he dies. Dukat insists Sisko release Ghemor's body to him so Ghemor can be granted a military funeral on Cardassia as part of Dukat's intentions to tell the public that Ghemor recanted his opposition to the Dominion on his deathbed. Sisko rejects the request and instead allows Kira to bury Ghemor on Bajor beside her father's grave.

== Reception ==
In 2018, SyFy recommend this episode for its abbreviated watch guide for the Bajoran character Kira Nerys. Tor.com gave it six out of ten.
