= Life Support (Star Trek: Deep Space Nine) =

- Star Trek: Deep Space Nine episode
- Episode no.: Season 3 Episode 13
- Directed by: Reza Badiyi
- Story by: Christian Ford; Roger Soffer
- Teleplay by: Ronald D. Moore
- Cinematography by: Jonathan West
- Production code: 459
- Original air date: January 30, 1995

Guest appearances
- Louise Fletcher as Kai Winn; Philip Anglim as Bareil Antos; Aron Eisenberg as Nog; Lark Voorhies as Leanne; Andrew Prine as Legate Turrel; Ann Gillespie as Nurse Jabara

Episode chronology
← Previous "Past Tense, Part II"	Next → "Heart of Stone"
- Star Trek: Deep Space Nine season 3

"Life Support" is the 59th episode of the syndicated American science fiction television series Star Trek: Deep Space Nine, the 13th episode of the third season and the first episode to air following the premiere of its spinoff, Star Trek: Voyager.

Set in the 24th century, the series follows the adventures on Deep Space Nine, a space station near the planet Bajor, as the Bajorans recover from a brutal, decades-long occupation by the imperialistic Cardassians. In this episode, Vedek Bareil (Philip Anglim), a Bajoran cleric who is the lover of Deep Space Nine's first officer Kira Nerys (Nana Visitor), is severely injured during pivotal negotiations with the Cardassians.

== Plot ==
A ship carrying Vedek Bareil and the Bajoran spiritual leader Kai Winn (Louise Fletcher) to Deep Space Nine for peace negotiations with the Cardassians suffers a mishap, and Bareil is left gravely injured. Dr. Bashir (Alexander Siddig) finds that Bareil is braindead and tries to console Kira.

During the autopsy, Bashir discovers that Bareil's nervous system still shows signs of activity. He manages to revive Bareil by regenerating his brain. Kai Winn is pleased and wants Bareil to continue managing the negotiations, given his greater experience and diplomatic skill.

Bashir soon discovers that the revival is damaging Bareil's internal organs. He advises Bareil to go into stasis so that Bashir can find a solution, but Bareil refuses; he insists that he must finish the negotiations and create peace for his people. Bashir considers giving Bareil the experimental drug Vasokin, which would increase the blood flow to his organs and allow him to resume negotiations, but would ultimately damage his internal organs further.

The talks resume, but Bareil's condition continues to deteriorate, especially with Kai Winn continuing to probe him for advice when he should be recovering. Eventually, the Vasokin treatments begin to inflict brain damage, and Bareil falls unconscious again. Winn insists on keeping Bareil alive at all costs; Bashir accuses her of only wanting him alive so he can be a scapegoat in case the negotiations fail.

Bashir replaces the damaged part of Bareil's brain with a positronic matrix. The surgery is a success, but Bareil is still severely brain-damaged with a life expectancy of only a few months, just enough time to possibly conclude his negotiations with the Cardassians. Kira speaks with him, but he barely recognises her and is no longer the man she fell in love with.

Bareil is kept alive long enough to aid in completing the negotiations, and the treaty is signed between Bajor and Cardassia. As Bareil's condition worsens, Kira asks Bashir to replace the remainder of his damaged brain with positronic matrices, but Bashir refuses on the grounds that it will remove any 'spark of life' that Bareil has left. Winn agrees that it is time to allow Bareil to die. The episode closes with Kira at Bareil's bedside, recounting for a slowly dying Bareil how she first fell in love with him.

In a side plot, Jake Sisko (Cirroc Lofton) must confront his Ferengi friend Nog (Aron Eisenberg)'s misogynist attitudes toward women and dating.

== Reception ==
Reviewing the episode for Tor.com in 2013, Keith R.A. DeCandido gave the episode a rating of five out of ten; he praised the performances of Siddig, Fletcher and Visitor and the dynamics developed between their characters, but found Anglim's performance as Bareil "wooden", and the side plot involving Jake and Nog "out of place". Zack Handlen, reviewing the episode for The A.V. Club in 2012, praised the episode's commitment to taking Bareil's death seriously, and appreciated the character development it illustrated for Winn and Bashir, but found the contrast between the main plot and the side plot "grating" and "inane", and criticized the side plot in that Jake was encouraged to condone Nog's misogyny.

In 2018, SyFy recommend this episode for its abbreviated watch guide for the character Kira Nerys. In 2020, io9 listed this as one of the "must-watch" episodes of the series.

== Releases ==
This episode was released on VHS paired with "Heart of Stone".

It was released on LaserDisc in the United States on October 26, 1999, paired with "Heart of Stone". The disc was 12 inches with both sides used giving a runtime of 92 minutes, in NTSC format.
