= Thomas Kopache =

American actor (born 1945)

- Born: October 17, 1945 (age 80); Manchester, New Hampshire, U.S.
- Occupation: Actor

Thomas Kopache (born October 17, 1945) is an American actor.

== Career ==
Kopache was born in Manchester, New Hampshire, the son of Dorothy E. (née Sterling). He is known for his roles as Assistant Secretary of State Bob Slattery in The West Wing and for various roles in the Star Trek franchise. He has also appeared in the stage productions of As You Like It as the banished Duke and in Antigone as Creon.

He has appeared in three of the Star Trek series and, along with Jeffrey Combs, Vaughn Armstrong, J. G. Hertzler and Randy Oglesby, is one of only five actors to portray as many as seven characters. Kopache played a Romulan in the Star Trek: The Next Generation episode "The Next Phase", a hologram in "Emergence" and a Starfleet officer in Star Trek Generations. On Star Trek: Deep Space Nine he played Kira Taban, the father of Kira Nerys (Nana Visitor), in "Ties of Blood and Water" and "Wrongs Darker Than Death or Night". On Star Trek: Voyager he played the planner of an alien settlement discovered to be in stasis by the Voyager crew. In 1994, he portrayed Tu'Pari in the Babylon 5 episode "The Parliament of Dreams".

Kopache made a brief appearance in No Country For Old Men as a boot and western wear salesman. Kopache guest starred as Vic Feldspar, Craig Feldspar's lisping, Jack LaLanne-like father in "Living Will", a sixth-season episode of Malcolm in the Middle. He briefly appeared as blackjack player Borsalino Cap in "The Contingency", the second-season premiere of the TV series Person of Interest.

=== "Catheter Cowboy" ===
In 2017, Kopache appeared on the HBO show Last Week Tonight as the "Catheter Cowboy", a character based on a commercial that aired on networks such as Fox News. Kopache's character would star in a similar-looking commercial and initially appear to talk about pain involving catheter use, but would then explain subjects such as the nuclear triad and the problems the American Health Care Act of 2017 offered. John Oliver bought commercial airtime in the Washington D.C. area and aired Kopache's segment live on stations such as Morning Joe and Fox & Friends in an attempt to send a message to President Donald Trump, as he was aware that Trump watched these shows.

== Selected filmography ==
=== Film ===
Year	Title	Role	Notes
1983	Without a Trace	Police officer	
1991	Liebestraum	Dr. Parker	
1993	This Boy's Life	Geiger Counter Vendor	
1994	Mr. Jones	Mr. Wilson	
1994	Star Trek Generations	Com Officer	
1995	Leaving Las Vegas	Mr. Simpson	
1996	Ghosts of Mississippi	Thorn McIntyre	
1997	Breakdown	Calhoun	
1997	One Night Stand	Merv	
1998	Recoil	Captain Trent	
1999	Stigmata	Father Durning	
2002	Catch Me If You Can	Principal Evans	
2003	A Man Apart	Chief Neal	
2005	Adam & Steve	Joe	
2006	Ten 'til Noon	Mr. Duke	
2007	Zodiac	Copy Editor #1	
2007	No Country for Old Men	Boot Salesman	
2007	Trust Me	Amos Sands	
2015	The App	Psychotic Man	
2015	Chasing Eagle Rock	Sam	
2016	37	George Bernstein	
2017	The Sounding	Seth	

=== Television ===
Year	Title	Role	Notes
1993	For Their Own Good	Dr Mason	Television movie
1994	Star Trek: The Next Generation	The Engineer	Episode: Emergence
1995	The X-Files	General Callahan	Episode: The Walk
1996	Star Trek: Voyager	Viorsa	Episode: The Thaw
1997	Star Trek: Deep Space Nine	Kira Taban	Episode: Ties of Blood and Water
1998	Star Trek: Deep Space Nine	Kira Taban	Episode: Wrongs Darker than Death or Night
2001	CSI: Crime Scene Investigation	Mr. Willoughby	Episode: You've Got Male
2001	Star Trek: Enterprise	Vulcan Attaché Tos	Episode: Broken Bow
2002–2005, 2020	The West Wing	Bob Slattery	15 episodes
2003	Stargate SG-1	Ellori	1 episode
2004	Boston Legal	Judge Dale Wallace	1 episode
2004	Star Trek: Enterprise	The Alien	Episode: Harbinger
2005	Malcolm in the Middle	Vic Feldspar	1 episode
2006	Close to Home	Judge Salter	4 episodes
2007	Psych	Leonard Sirtis	1 episode
2010	Castle	Abe Sandrich	Season 3, Episode 4
2010	Bones	Gregory Gering	Season 6, Episode 4
2015	Jessica Jones	Dr. Kozlov	2 episodes
2016	MacGyver	O'Brian	1 episode
2017–2018	Last Week Tonight with John Oliver	Catheter Cowboy	5 episodes
2018	The Tick	Nabakov	2 episodes
2018	House of Cards	Earl Hanna	1 episode
2020	Messiah	Judge Harold Pleva	1 episode
