= Business as Usual (Star Trek: Deep Space Nine) =

- Star Trek: Deep Space Nine episode
- Episode no.: Season 5 Episode 18
- Directed by: Siddig El Fadil
- Written by: Bradley Thompson; David Weddle
- Production code: 516
- Original air date: April 7, 1997

Guest appearances
- Lawrence Tierney as Regent; Steven Berkoff as Hagath; Josh Pais as Gaila; Tim Halligan as Farrakk

Episode chronology
← Previous "A Simple Investigation"	Next → "Ties of Blood and Water"
- Star Trek: Deep Space Nine season 5

"Business as Usual" is the 116th episode of the television series Star Trek: Deep Space Nine, the 18th episode of the fifth season.

Set in the 24th century, the series follows the adventures on Deep Space Nine, a space station near the planet Bajor, as the Bajorans recover from a decades-long, brutal occupation by the imperialistic Cardassians. In this episode, despondent over his mounting financial woes, the Ferengi bartender Quark allows his cousin Gaila to talk him into getting involved in the arms dealing business. Meanwhile, Chief O'Brien juggles fatherhood, work and social life as he cares for his son Yoshi.

This episode was one of two directed by Alexander Siddig, who also played the role of Doctor Julian Bashir on the show.

== Plot ==
Quark is in dire straits; having amassed several large debts from deals that soured that he cannot possibly pay off, with the bar already put up as collatoral against multiple loans, he is officially bankrupt. Suddenly his cousin Gaila arrives on the station and offers him a chance to pay off his debts by participating in an arms dealing scheme. Despite his misgivings, Quark decides he has nothing left to lose and accepts. Since Constable Odo will confiscate any actual weapons brought aboard Deep Space Nine, Quark will use the holosuites in his bar to simulate the weapons for potential customers. The merchandise will be supplied by Gaila's associate, the suavely sinister Hagath, and all transfers of cargo will occur off the station. Quark agrees to the deal, enticed by the prospects of settling his debts, getting his business licence back and even turning a profit. Hagath arranges for Quark's percentage of the proceeds to go immediately to his creditors until his debts are fully paid.

Quark is a natural at selling weapons and the scheme becomes quite profitable. The Bajoran government prevents Odo from arresting Quark, citing Hagath's sale of weapons to the Bajoran resistance during the Cardassian occupation. However, Quark soon finds himself ostracized by his friends, particularly Jadzia Dax, who is disgusted that Quark has sunk so low. Gaila warns Quark not to cross Hagath, bringing news that an associate who did so has been killed. The group's latest client is the Regent of Palamar, who wants to make a purchase that will kill millions of followers of his opponent, General Nassuc. Gaila and Hagath take the matter lightly, but Quark is horrified at the idea of being responsible for so much death.

Having now paid off his debts, Quark realizes he must find a way to escape with his life and avoid being part of a genocide program. He invites Nassuc to the station, on the pretense of supplying weapons to both sides, and arranges for Nassuc and the Regent to encounter each other in a cargo bay. A firefight ensues between the two leaders, and they pursue Gaila and Hagath off the station, believing the pair to be responsible for the double-cross. The Regent is later killed by Nassuc's forces, preventing his genocidal plan. Quark's friendship with Jadzia is renewed, but he ends up in debt once again when Captain Sisko makes him pay for the damage caused by the firefight.

Meanwhile, O'Brien has trouble caring for his new son Kirayoshi, who cries incessantly unless O'Brien holds him. He carries Yoshi around all day, even at work and while playing darts in the bar. The baby finally settles down when Worf holds him, allowing O'Brien to get some much-needed rest.

== Reception ==
In 2017, Business Insider listed "Business as Usual" as one of the most underrated episodes of the Star Trek franchise. They note that a speech from the character Gaila on the insignificance of one star or planet among countless others is a re-interpretation of a famous monologue by Orson Welles in the 1949 film The Third Man and that, while Ferengi are usually played for comic relief on the series, they adopt a more serious tone in this episode as Quark struggles with the morality of a lucrative arms deal which might lead to the death of millions. Tor.com gave it six out of ten. Zack Handlen of The A.V. Club thought that "a Quark-centric story that isn't broadly comedic is a welcome change of pace". He found the story too simplified for his tastes and thought that the subject of arms could have done with more than one episode, suggesting: "The brevity of all this puts it into after-school special territory, and it might’ve been more effective to have Quark’s corruption happen more gradually, thus giving his redemption actual stakes".
