= Destiny (Star Trek: Deep Space Nine) =

- Star Trek: Deep Space Nine episode
- Episode no.: Season 3 Episode 15
- Directed by: Les Landau
- Written by: David Steve Cohen; Martin A. Winer
- Production code: 461
- Original air date: February 13, 1995

Guest appearances
- Tracy Scoggins as Gilora; Wendy Robie as Ulani; Erick Avari as Vedek Yarka; Jessica Hendra as Dejar

Episode chronology
← Previous "Heart of Stone"	Next → "Prophet Motive"
- Star Trek: Deep Space Nine season 3

"Destiny" is the 61st episode of the science fiction television series Star Trek: Deep Space Nine, the 15th episode of the third season.

Set in the 24th century, the series follows the adventures on Deep Space Nine, a space station near the planet Bajor, as the Bajorans recover from a brutal, decades-long occupation by the imperialistic Cardassians. The station is adjacent to a wormhole connecting Bajor to the distant Gamma Quadrant; the wormhole is inhabited by powerful beings worshipped by the Bajorans as "the Prophets". In this episode, a collaboration between the United Federation of Planets and Cardassia to establish a communications relay on the other side of the wormhole is complicated by an ancient Bajoran prophecy of doom.

== Plot ==
A team of Cardassian scientists arrive at Deep Space Nine to help build a relay that will allow communication through the Bajoran wormhole. A Bajoran priest, Vedek Yarka, tells the station's human commander Benjamin Sisko that an ancient prophecy predicts that this project will destroy the wormhole: "three vipers" (the Cardassians) will cause the "temple gates" (the wormhole) to be cast open and burned. Yarka is treated with skepticism, especially when it is learned that only two Cardassian scientists (Ulani and Gilora) are expected, not three. When they arrive, however, they explain that a third scientist will arrive later. This information makes Major Kira, Sisko's devout Bajoran second-in-command, begin to believe the prophecy. Yarka confronts Kira about her faith and her duty to help Sisko, whom Bajorans believe to be the Emissary of the Prophets.

When the third scientist, Dejar, arrives, she is greeted coldly by Ulani and Gilora. While Chief O'Brien and Gilora work on the station (complicated by the fact that Gilora misinterprets O'Brien's hostility towards her as a romantic overture), Sisko takes Ulani and Dejar through the wormhole in the Defiant to set up the relay. They discover a comet, which Kira believes to be the "sword of stars" mentioned in the prophecy. She discusses the prophecy with Sisko, but he chooses his role as a Starfleet officer over that of Emissary.

The relay is deployed and the test begins. A particular carrier wave causes the comet to change course and head towards the wormhole. If the comet enters the wormhole, a substance in its core, silithium, will cause the wormhole to be destroyed. O'Brien proposes modifying the Defiant's phasers to be able to vaporize the comet. Sisko, despite starting to believe in the prophecy, goes ahead with the plan.

Instead of vaporizing it, the phasers fire a standard burst that breaks the comet into three fragments; O'Brien's modifications never came online. Gilora accuses Dejar of sabotaging the phasers, which turns out to be true: Dejar was sent by the Cardassians' intelligence agency, the Obsidian Order (which opposes collaboration between Cardassia and Bajor), to sabotage the mission. To prevent the silithium from destroying the wormhole, Sisko and Kira guide the fragments through with a shuttlecraft. Some of the silithium nevertheless leaks out and reacts with the wormhole; the reaction enables the communications link to be established. Kira and Sisko realize that the prophecy has come true: the three vipers were the comet fragments, and the silithium ignited the wormhole, "casting open the temple gates" to allow communication through them.

== Production ==
The episode concept was pitched by David S. Cohen and Martin A. Winer. The original idea involved Starfleet being uncomfortable with Sisko being seen as a religious figure by the Bajorans and deciding he needs to be relieved from his post. A prophecy gives them the chance to prove that Sisko is not the Emissary, but everything he does only serves to fulfil the prophecy.

Tracy Scoggins plays the Cardassian Scientist Gilora. Scoggins had such a good time making this episode that, during breaks in filming, she took to wandering around the Paramount lot in full makeup taking the opportunity to scare schoolchildren on buses, to the extent that the security called the DS9 set, and asked them to "do something about keeping your aliens contained over there?" Scoggins later became better known for her role as Captain Elizabeth Lochley in Babylon 5. Erick Avari plays Vedek Yarka, previously appeared in the Star Trek: The Next Generation episode "Unification". He later became known for his role in the film Stargate and the television series. Avari noted the long working days and his tendency to giggle when tired, but he said he had such a great time laughing with makeup artist Nina Kraft that he was able to keep a straight face when it came time to deliver his doom and gloom prophecies.

== Reception ==
Zack Handlen of The A.V. Club was skeptical of the episode saying: "Prophecy is a lousy way to tell a story" but optimistic that the show would "find some interesting things to say about all of this". He is glad the episode wasn't over-dramatic but found it "curiously low stakes" and lacks suspense. Tor.com gave it five out of ten.

== Releases ==
This episode was released on LaserDisc in Japan on October 2, 1998, in the half-season collection 3rd Season Vol. 2. The set included episodes from "Destiny" to "The Adversary" on double sided 12 inch optical discs; the box set had total runtime of 552 minutes and included audio tracks in English and Japanese.

== Bibliography ==
- Cohen, David S. (February 10, 2009). Screen Plays: How 25 Scripts Made it to a Theater Near You - For Better or Worse. HarperCollins. ISBN 9780061431579.
