= Dey Young =

American actress (b. 1955)

- Born: July 28, 1955 (age 71)
- Occupation: Actress
- Years active: 1979–present
- Known for: Pretty Woman; The Masterpiece Society; Rock 'n' Roll High School; Spaceballs; A Simple Investigation

Dey Young (born July 28, 1955) is an American actress who has appeared in over 100 movies and television shows.

== Career ==
Among Young's acting credits is the part of Kate Rambeau in Rock 'n' Roll High School, a character she re-visited in the 1994 film Shake, Rattle and Rock!. She has also appeared in films such as Strange Behavior, The Running Man, The Serpent and the Rainbow, Spontaneous Combustion, Pretty Woman, No Place to Hide, Conflict of Interest, National Lampoon's Barely Legal and Flicka.

Young has performed in several guest roles in the Star Trek franchise, as Hannah Bates on the Star Trek: The Next Generation episode "The Masterpiece Society", Arissa on the Star Trek: Deep Space Nine episode "A Simple Investigation" (two seasons before her sister guested in an episode), and Keyla on the Star Trek: Enterprise episode "Two Days and Two Nights". Her science fiction credits also extend to playing a waitress in the 1987 Mel Brooks comedy Spaceballs. In 1995 she appeared in the TV series Extreme based on a Rocky Mountain Search and Rescue team. She appeared in a two part episode of Diagnosis Murder "Fatal Impact" in 1997. On May 23, 2008, Young appeared on The Young and the Restless as Elizabeth Hartford, the ex-wife of character David Chow.

== Selected filmography ==
- Rock 'n' Roll High School (1979) - Kate Rambeau
- Strange Behavior (poVhp 1981) - Carol
- Strange Invaders (1983) - Teen Girl (Prologue)
- Young Lust (1984)
- Doin' Time (1985) - Vicki Norris
- Spaceballs (1987) - Waitress
- Zärtliche Chaoten (1987) - Rosi
- The Running Man (1987) - Amy
- The Serpent and the Rainbow (1988) - Mrs. Cassedy
- Starke Zeiten (1988) - Jessica Norman
- Not Quite Human II (1989, TV Movie) - Prof. Victoria Gray
- Spontaneous Combustion (1990) - Rachel
- Pretty Woman (1990) - Snobby Saleswoman
- Frankie and Johnny (1991) - Johnny's Ex-Wife
- Back in the USSR (1992) - Claudia
- No Place to Hide (1992) - Karen
- Conflict of Interest (1993) - Vera
- In the Shadows, Someone's Watching (1993) - Lydia Holroyd
- Shake, Rattle and Rock! (1994, TV Movie) - Kate Rambeau Sr
- Extreme - Marnie Shepard
- Pie in the Sky (1995) - Mrs. Tarnell
- Executive Decision (1996) - Gail
- Shadow Conspiracy (1997) - Janet
- Last Chance Love (1997) - Elke
- True Heart (1997) - Wanda
- The Rat Pack (1998, TV Movie) - Jeanne Martin
- A Chance of Snow (1998, TV Movie) - Katherine Parker
- The Mod Squad (1999) - Mrs. Cochrane
- Shiloh 2: Shiloh Season (1999) - Mrs. Howard (uncredited)
- Guardian (2001) - Lt. Van Buren
- National Lampoon's Barely Legal (2003) - Mrs. Lewis
- Red Eye (2005) - Dallas Gate Agent
- Flicka (2006) - Esther Koop
- Protecting the King (2007) - Dee
- What Just Happened (2008) - Ben's First Wife
- The Northern Kingdom (2009) - Sandra
- The Wayshower (2011) - Dr. Olivia
- Tarot: A Documentary Love Story (2014) - Mona Morris
- Ovation (2015) - Annabelle D'Angelo - Rick's Wife
- Unbridled (2015) - Karen Miller
- The American Connection (2017) - State of Dept 2
- The Final Wish (2018) - Alice
- The Chain (2019) - Vilma
- Amsterdam (2022) - Alvelia Vandenheuvel
