= Fadwa El Guindi =

Egyptian-American anthropologist

- Born: 1941 (age 84–85); Egypt
- Citizenship: Egypt, United States
- Occupations: Anthropologist, Actor

Fadwa El Guindi (born 1941) is an Egyptian-American anthropologist and former professor of anthropology at Qatar University. She is the author of several ethnographies, including The Myth of Ritual: A Native's Ethnography of Zapotec Life-Crisis Rituals (1986) and By Noon Prayer: The Rhythm of Islam (2008).

== Early life and education ==
El Guindi was born in Egypt. After graduating in 1960 with a BA in political science from the American University in Cairo, she obtained a PhD in anthropology in 1972 from the University of Texas at Austin.

== Career ==
El Guindi held positions as assistant professor of anthropology at the University of California, Los Angeles from 1972 to 1981 and adjunct professor at the University of Southern California from 1982 to 2004. In 2006 she became a professor at Qatar University, where she served as head of the department of social services from 2007 to 2010.

El Guindi sat on the editorial board of the journal Field Methods and on the international advisory board of Signs: Journal of Women in Culture and Society.

El Guindi has one director's credit and one actor's credit. In 1986, she made the film El Sebou': Egyptian Birth Ritual, which was sponsored by the Office of Folklife Programs at the Smithsonian Institution. In 1997, El Guindi guest-starred as Amsha Bashir, mother of Julian Bashir, in the Star Trek: Deep Space Nine episode "Doctor Bashir, I Presume?".

== Selected works ==
- The Myth of Ritual: A Native's Ethnography of Zapotec Life-Crisis Rituals. Tucson, Arizona: University of Arizona Press, 1986.
- Veil: Modesty, Privacy, Resistance. Berg Publishers. 1999.
- Visual Anthropology: Essential Method and Theory. Altamira Press, Walnut Creek, California, 2004.
- By Noon Prayer: The Rhythm of Islam. Berg Publishers. 2008.
- "Veiling Infitah with Muslim Ethic: Egypt's Contemporary Islamic Movement". Social Problems 28(4): 465–485 (1981).
- "From Pictorializing to Visual Anthropology". In Handbook of Methods in Cultural Anthropology. H. Russell Bernard, editor. Altamira Press, Sage Publications, 459–511, 1998.
