= In the Pale Moonlight =

- Star Trek: Deep Space Nine episode
- Episode no.: Season 6 Episode 19
- Directed by: Victor Lobl
- Story by: Peter Allan Fields
- Teleplay by: Michael Taylor
- Cinematography by: Jonathan West
- Editing by: Michael Westmore, Jr.
- Production code: 543
- Original air date: April 13, 1998
- Running time: 45 minutes

Guest appearances
- Andrew Robinson as Elim Garak; Stephen McHattie as Vreenak; Howard Shangraw as Grathon Tolar; Jeffrey Combs as Weyoun; Casey Biggs as Damar

Episode chronology
← Previous "Inquisition"	Next → "His Way"
- Star Trek: Deep Space Nine season 6

"In the Pale Moonlight" is the 143rd episode of the American science fiction television series Star Trek: Deep Space Nine, the 19th of the sixth season. It originally aired on April 15, 1998, in broadcast syndication.

Set in the 24th century, Deep Space Nine follows the adventures of the crew of the fictional space station Deep Space Nine; the later seasons of the series follow a war between the United Federation of Planets and the Dominion, a hostile alien empire that has formed an alliance with the nearby Cardassian Union. In this episode, Captain Benjamin Sisko (Avery Brooks) works with former spy Elim Garak (Andrew Robinson) to trick the Romulans into joining the war against the Dominion.

The episode received Nielsen ratings of 4.8 points corresponding to nearly 4.7 million viewers, and is widely regarded as one of the franchise's greatest episodes.

== Plot ==
The episode is told in flashback, as Sisko records a personal log entry on the events of the past two weeks.

As the Federation's losses in the Dominion War mount, Sisko decides that he must bring the Romulans into the war on the Federation's side no matter the cost. Sisko enlists Garak's help to find evidence that the Dominion is planning to attack the Romulans, but all of Garak's contacts in Cardassian territory end up dead shortly after communicating with him. Garak suggests forging the evidence instead. Hesitant, but motivated by the Dominion's recent conquest of Betazed, Sisko obtains permission from Starfleet to proceed.

At Garak's request, Sisko secures the release of a forger named Grathon Tolar from a Klingon prison. To obtain an authentic Cardassian data rod, he is forced to trade a large quantity of bio-mimetic gel, a rare, dangerous and strictly regulated material, over Dr. Bashir's protests. When Tolar stabs Quark in a drunken altercation, Sisko bribes Quark to drop the matter. Tolar forges a holographic record of a meeting between Dominion leaders discussing plans to invade Romulus. On Garak's advice, Sisko arranges a secret meeting with Vreenak, an influential Romulan senator. Sisko gives Vreenak the recording but the senator discovers the forgery and vows to expose the deception. As Sisko faces the possibility that his actions may drive the Romulans to side with the Dominion, he learns that Vreenak's ship was destroyed en route home.

Sisko confronts Garak, who admits he planted a bomb on Vreenak's ship. Garak explains that when the Romulans search the wreckage and find the rod, any imperfections will be attributed to damage from the explosion and the Romulans will assume that the Dominion assassinated Vreenak to prevent him from bringing the rod back. The recording will implicate the Dominion as planned; Garak tells Sisko he can ease his conscience with the knowledge that the Alpha Quadrant may have been saved, at the cost of the lives of Vreenak and Tolar (whom Garak has also killed) and Sisko's self-respect—which Garak calls a bargain. Soon, the Romulans declare war on the Dominion.

At the end of his log entry, Sisko wrestles with having condoned forgery, selling prohibited materials, bribery, and murder for the good of the Alpha Quadrant. After thinking about it, Sisko declares that he can live with it, and that—if he had to—he would do it all again. He then deletes the log.

== Production ==
=== Writing ===
"But the most damning thing of all... I think I can live with it. "

— Sisko

The episode has origins in a discussion the writing staff had about the Vietnam War, which quickly moved onto the Watergate scandal. They began working on an idea in which Jake Sisko discovered some incriminating information regarding Shakaar, the leader of the Bajoran government. If revealed, it would bring down the government during a time of war, which would force Sisko to prevent his son from revealing the information. At this point, the episode was called "Patriot". The plot then evolved to focus on Sisko instead. Writer Michael Taylor wrote a screenplay which saw Jake Sisko attempting to interview Garak, but following the evasiveness of the Cardassian, he realises that something is amiss. Sisko tells him to back off from Garak, but Jake's investigation reveals that the duo were attempting to bring the Romulans into the war against the Dominion. Sisko would tell his son that he would prevent the publishing of the story, but the writing team did not buy into the conflict between those characters.

Ronald D. Moore began working with Taylor to revise the screenplay, dropping Jake from the plot entirely. They were having trouble with the pacing of the story, but Moore realised while drinking late at night that it would work if it was told in flashbacks. He pitched the idea the following morning, and it was accepted by the writing team. The screenplay was entirely re-written. Taylor called the final version "brilliant" but admitted that it had mostly been written by Moore. Moore explained that the story needed something of weight in order to push Sisko along. The writing team discussed having the Dominion take one of the well-known planets of the Federation. Vulcan was considered, but it was felt to be too important and so Betazed was chosen instead. Ira Steven Behr added the final line of the episode, "I can live with it", as a reference to the 1962 film The Man Who Shot Liberty Valance. The title of the episode came from the line in the 1989 Batman film: "Have you ever danced with the devil in the pale moonlight?", but Moore did not know it was original to the film; he assumed it was an old folk saying.

=== Direction and casting ===
Director Victor Lobl also planned out the mannerisms shown by Brooks as Sisko where he talks directly to the camera. He praised the actor, saying that he delivered exactly what Lobl's written direction had described. All of those sequences were shot almost in direct continuity to ensure that the audience believed that it was a single log recording. Lobl had those filmed very tightly, and so there were not many options available in editing as only two angles were filmed for those sequences. The script had called for Sisko to get more and more drunk during those sequences as he descends into the flashbacks; Lobl had expected the studio to pull that idea before filming, but they did not. Lobl also had Sisko begin to remove various parts of his uniform at the same time, which he felt demonstrated that the character was baring his soul about the story.

"In the Pale Moonlight" featured several recurring characters and actors, with Combs as Weyoun, Biggs as Damar and Robinson as Garak. Joining them was McHattie, portraying Senator Vreenak. He made a second appearance in the Star Trek franchise in the Star Trek: Enterprise episode "The Xindi" as an alien foreman.

== Themes ==
Executive producer Rick Berman said that when creating Star Trek: Deep Space Nine, he had to obey the rules as set out by franchise creator Gene Roddenberry, and compared the behavior of normal Starfleet officers to that of Boy Scouts. Berman suggested that "In the Pale Moonlight" was the exception. Taylor said that the episode "pushes the boundaries in a realistic way". In an interview in 2011, when talking about "In the Pale Moonlight", Robinson compared Starfleet to Americans in general. He said: "we're not really willing to take the consequences of our actions, and sometimes we have to do very dirty things, and we have to hurt people, and we pretend that that doesn't exist, that Americans would never do that. We dealt with issues like that and I don't think... you know... the other shows really went as far as we did."

== Reception ==
=== Broadcast ===
"In the Pale Moonlight" was first broadcast on April 15, 1998, in broadcast syndication. It received Nielsen ratings of 4.8 percent, placing it in 14th place overall in its timeslot. Among first-run syndication series, it was placed second for the week behind Xena: Warrior Princess, but ahead of Hercules: The Legendary Journeys. This was higher than the share received by "Inquisition", broadcast in the week prior with a 4.7 percent share and "His Way" in the week afterwards with 4.3 percent.

=== Critical reception ===
"In the Pale Moonlight" has been one of the best received episodes of the series by fans. A survey conducted by Syfy at the end of the series placed the episode as the fans' favourite, while members of the Official Star Trek Fan Club have ranked it among the top ten. Jay Garmon at TechRepublic listed it as the best episode of the series in 2012, describing it as being when Deep Space Nine stood apart from the other series in the franchise and "found a whole new layer of storytelling, depth, and relevance". Charlie Jane Anders listed "In the Pale Moonlight" as the seventh best episode of the entire franchise, in a list of the top 100 episodes for io9 in 2014, having placed it in the same position in a top ten of the franchise in 2011. Lexi Watson ranked "In the Pale Moonlight" in first place out of the whole franchise for Digital Spy in 2016, saying: "Do [Sisko's] good intentions matter? Does the end always justify the means? Everyone will take something different from this episode and ultimately there may not be a right answer. You don't get that on Downton Abbey."

Most critics also responded positively to the episode. The review of the VHS release in Dreamwatch described the episode as "probably the strongest of the season" and among the best episodes of Deep Space Nine. It called the plot "original", "daring" and "unexpected". Frank M. Robinson in his 1999 book, Science Fiction of the 20th Century, describes "In the Pale Moonlight" as: "Captain Sisko is forced to betray his ideals to save the lives of millions on a galactic scale at the cost of one petty criminal and one ambassador of an unfriendly nation. On the surface, no contest but Brooks (Sisko) played the role with depth and feeling unusual in a science-fiction series." He added that the TV Guide had described it as one of the best dramatic episodes of the season. Keith DeCandido reviewed the episode for Tor, giving it a rating of ten out of ten. He called the fall of Betazed a "masterstroke" because it made the viewer invested in the conflict. He praised the suffering Sisko had for doing what he did, and said that both Brooks and Robinson were "at their best" with two "bravura performances". In 2003, Mark Jones and Lance Parkin said in Beyond the Final Frontier: An Unauthorised Review of Star Trek that the episode was "good" but "not half as shocking and dangerous as some fans would have you believe". They suggested that similar ideas were used on a number of police procedurals, and were the standard on Mission: Impossible.

In 2013, Zack Handlen, in his review for The A.V. Club, suggested that the most shocking aspect of "In the Pale Moonlight" was that Sisko's actions were not shocking but only provided a twist. He said that the script "never overplays Sisko's deepening sense of crisis", and avoided presenting any choices as right or wrong.

In 2013, The Guardian recommended this episode as an example of a "smarter version" of Star Trek than the film Star Trek Into Darkness, noting this episode shows the darker side of the franchise.

In 2015, Geek.com recommended this episode as "essential watching" for their abbreviated Star Trek: Deep Space Nine binge-watching guide.

In 2016, Radio Times ranked the Sisko's deletion of his logs the 27th greatest moment of all Star Trek film and television. They note this as case where Sisko gives up his principles, and note it as an example of the moral complexities presented in the show; he tries to weigh his actions against the goal of a victory in the Dominion war.

The episode has been frequently ranked as one of the best episodes of Deep Space Nine and of the Star Trek franchise as a whole. In 2016, The Hollywood Reporter ranked this episode as the #1 best of Star Trek: Deep Space Nine. In 2018, Vulture ranked this episode the third best of Star Trek: Deep Space Nine. In 2018, Nerdist ranked this episode the 11th most essential episode of the series. SciFiNow ranked this one of the top ten episodes of Star Trek: Deep Space Nine, remarking that "This could be the show’s finest hour".

In 2007, DVD Talk said of the episode: "Everything from the directing to the writing, to the acting hits all of the right notes. This is an example of Star Trek at its best." In 2009, Time rated "In the Pale Moonlight" as one of the top ten moments of Star Trek. They called it "chilling", as Sisko slowly gives up his principles as the war gets more desperate. In 2013, Slate ranked "In the Pale Moonlight" one of the ten best episodes in the Star Trek franchise. In 2016, The Washington Post ranked "In the Pale Moonlight" the fourth best episode of all Star Trek. Empire ranked "In the Pale Moonlight" 13th out of the 50 top episodes of all Star Trek in 2016. In 2016, IGN ranked this the sixth best episode of all Star Trek series. In 2017, Space.com rated "In the Pale Moonlight" as the fifth best Star Trek episode overall out of its 700+ episodes, behind "The Measure of a Man" (#1), "The Trouble with Tribbles" (#2), "The Menagerie"(#3) and "The Best of Both Worlds" (#4). In June 2019, it was rated the fifth best episode up to that time, by Screen Rant. Io9 ranked it as the seventh best episode of all Star Trek episodes up to 2011. In 2015, Geek.com rated the moment when the Romulans announce to Sisko they determined the data rod was a fake, the 13th best moment in all Star Trek. In 2020, ScreenRant ranked "In the Pale Moonlight" the tenth best episode of all Star Trek franchise television episodes up to that time.

In 2019, Screen Rant ranked a character introduced in this episode, Vreenak, as the third most important Romulan of the Star Trek franchise.

In 2020, SyFy also recommended watching "In the Pale Moonlight" as background on the Romulans for Star Trek: Picard.

== Home media release ==
"In the Pale Moonlight" was released as part of a two-episode VHS release in the United Kingdom in November 1998. The other episode featured on the tape was "His Way". It was released on DVD as part of the season six box set on November 4, 2003. It is also featured on the Star Trek Fan Collective – Captain's Log DVD box set as one of three Deep Space Nine episodes featured, along with the series finale "What You Leave Behind" and "Far Beyond the Stars", with an introduction by Avery Brooks. This was released on July 24, 2007.

This episode were released in 2017 on DVD with the complete series box set, which had 176 episodes in a 48 disc set.
