= Meridian (Star Trek: Deep Space Nine) =

- Star Trek: Deep Space Nine episode
- Episode no.: Season 3 Episode 8
- Directed by: Jonathan Frakes
- Story by: Hilary Bader; Evan Carlos Somers
- Teleplay by: Mark Gehred-O'Connell
- Production code: 454
- Original air date: November 14, 1994

Guest appearances
- Brett Cullen as Deral; Christine Healy as Seltin; Jeffrey Combs as Tiron

Episode chronology
← Previous "Civil Defense"	Next → "Defiant"
- Star Trek: Deep Space Nine season 3

"Meridian" is the 54th episode of the television series Star Trek: Deep Space Nine, the eighth episode of the third season and the last episode to air before the release of Star Trek Generations.

Dax falls in love with a man whose world is in a state of flux; Quark tries to create a holographic pleasure program "starring" Major Kira.

== Plot ==
While aboard the Defiant in the Gamma Quadrant, the DS9 crew is surprised to see a planet suddenly materialize right in front of them. The inhabitants of the planet invite the crew down for a visit.

The planet is called Meridian, and it spends most of its time in another phase of existence, where its people exist only as consciousness, with no physical being. The planet is in this dimension for a very short time. In twelve days it will disappear for sixty years. Each time it returns, the planet will have less time in this universe, and eventually will stop appearing.

The crew offer to help stabilize the planet so that it will not disappear forever. Jadzia Dax is distracted from her analysis of the problem by one of the Meridian people, a man named Deral (played by Brett Cullen). They have begun to fall in love. He tells her he will leave the planet and come with her instead of returning to the other phase. His people are not happy to hear this, because they have a very small population and cannot lose a member. To help them, Dax decides to stay on Meridian. She works quickly to find a way to alter her molecular structure so that she can slip into the other dimension along with the planet and its people. She is also able to help the crew stabilize the planet enough so that although it will still shift phases, next time it will stay in this universe for 30 years.

Time runs out, and Dax bids a tearful goodbye to her crewmates aboard the Defiant. She returns to Deral and waits with him for the phase shift. As the planet begins to shimmer out of the universe, she is wrenched by a force. Her body is not pulled out of phase with Deral's. She is stuck between dimensions, and, worse, is holding the entire planet there with her.

The crew beams her back to the ship, saving her life. Meridian slips safely into its other dimension. Dax returns to her bunk to be alone and mourn the 60 years she must wait before seeing Deral again.

Meanwhile, a DS9 visitor called Tiron employs Quark to make him a custom holosuite program featuring a holographic Kira. Quark tries multiple times to get enough data on Kira to make the hologram, and eventually breaks into secure files to accomplish this. Odo and Kira discover the security breach, and have a little fun at Quark's expense. They replace the holographic Kira's head with that of Quark, thereby infuriating Tiron and depriving Quark of his promised payment.

== Production ==
This episode features Jeffrey Combs as Tiron, in the first of many Star Trek appearances.

The episode is based on Brigadoon, a musical about a town that periodically disappears.

== Legacy ==
In 2016, "Meridian" was remarked as a Star Trek episode that did not have a traditional villain. In this man against nature plot the crew try to save a group of aliens from a natural phenomenon.

In 2018, SyFy noted this episode was remembered for featuring a one and done romance for Jadzia Dax, noting that although she develops feelings for the alien, their physiology and world events keep them apart.

In 2019, ScreenRant ranked this episode one of the ten worst episodes of Star Trek: Deep Space Nine. They note that at that time it had a rating of 5.7/10 based on user rankings on the site IMDB.

== Release ==
The episode was released on June 3, 2003 in North America as part of the season 3 DVD box set. "Meridian" was released in 2017 on DVD with the complete series box set, which had 176 episodes on 48 discs.
