= Civil Defense (Star Trek: Deep Space Nine) =

- Star Trek: Deep Space Nine episode
- Episode no.: Season 3 Episode 7
- Directed by: Reza Badiyi
- Written by: Mike Krohn
- Production code: 453
- Original air date: November 7, 1994

Guest appearances
- Andrew J. Robinson as Garak; Marc Alaimo as Dukat; Danny Goldring as Legate Kell

Episode chronology
← Previous "The Abandoned"	Next → "Meridian"
- Star Trek: Deep Space Nine season 3

"Civil Defense" is the 53rd episode of the television series Star Trek: Deep Space Nine, the seventh episode of the third season. The episode originally aired on television in syndication on November 7, 1994.

Set in the 24th century, the series follows the adventures on Deep Space Nine, a space station located near a stable wormhole between the Alpha and Gamma quadrants of the Milky Way Galaxy, near the planet Bajor, as the Bajorans recover from a long, brutal occupation by the imperialistic Cardassians. In this episode, the station goes on lockdown as a result of a security program dating back to the days when it was a Cardassian-controlled mining station.

This episode was written by Mike Krohn and directed by Reza Badiyi.

== Plot ==
While renovating the station's old ore processing unit, Chief O'Brien and Jake Sisko accidentally trip an old Cardassian security program, which was set to put the station on lockdown in the event of a Bajoran uprising during the occupation.

O'Brien, Jake, and Commander Sisko are trapped in the ore processing unit. Fail-safes in the system prevent the rest of the crew from accessing the area or beaming out the trapped people. When Jake enables himself, his father, and O'Brien to escape by crawling through an ore chute, a recording of Gul Dukat, the station's Cardassian former prefect, announces that the rioting Bajorans have escaped, and the entire station locks down. Major Kira, Dr. Bashir, and Lt. Dax are trapped in the operations center. Security chief Odo is dismayed to find himself locked in his office with Quark.

As the crew works to lift the lockdown program, another fail-safe is tripped. The Dukat recording warns the crew that the whole habitat ring will soon be flooded with poisonous gas. Cardassian ex-spy Garak advises the crew to shut off the life support system, which will prevent the release of the poison gas. When they do so, the Dukat recording announces that the station will self-destruct in two hours. When Garak tries to hack into the computer, impersonating Dukat's credentials, yet another fail-safe constructs a disruptor that fires random blasts around Ops, requiring the crew to take shelter.

Suddenly, the real Dukat beams into Ops. He teases the crew about their predicament before deactivating the disruptor. Dukat attempts to use his leverage to get Major Kira to agree to having a Cardassian garrison placed on the station, but she refuses. Dukat is prevented from beaming away by a new security program, from his superiors, designed to prevent Dukat from abandoning his post as an act of cowardice during a worker revolt. Furthermore, his access codes are now revoked. Now, no one—not even Dukat—will be allowed to leave the area before the self-destruct.

O'Brien and the Siskos have managed to blast their way out of the ore-processing unit by detonating leftover ore. From Ops, Dax manages to shut down the force fields set up in all the station's halls. With ten minutes left, Sisko makes his way to the computer that controls the station's shielding, and fortifies the shields just enough to absorb the energy of the station's self-destruct system, saving the station.

== Reception ==
In a 2014 review of this episode, The A.V. Club called it a "fine hour of television" and praised it as a "thrilling, intelligent story which satisfies genre expectations...." Keith R.A. DeCandido, of Tor.com, gave the episode a rating of 6 out of 10.

In 2016, Vox included this episode among 25 potential entry points into the Star Trek universe.

== Release ==
The episode was released on June 3, 2003 in North America as part of the season 3 DVD box set. The episode was also released in 2017 on DVD with the complete series 48-disc box set, which has 176 episodes from the series.
