= The Abandoned (Star Trek: Deep Space Nine) =

- Star Trek: Deep Space Nine episode
- Episode no.: Season 3 Episode 6
- Directed by: Avery Brooks
- Written by: D. Thomas Maio; Steve Warnek
- Production code: 452
- Original air date: October 31, 1994

Guest appearances
- Bumper Robinson as a Jem'Hadar; Jill Sayre as Mardah; Leslie Bevis as Boslic captain

Episode chronology
← Previous "Second Skin"	Next → "Civil Defense"
- Star Trek: Deep Space Nine season 3

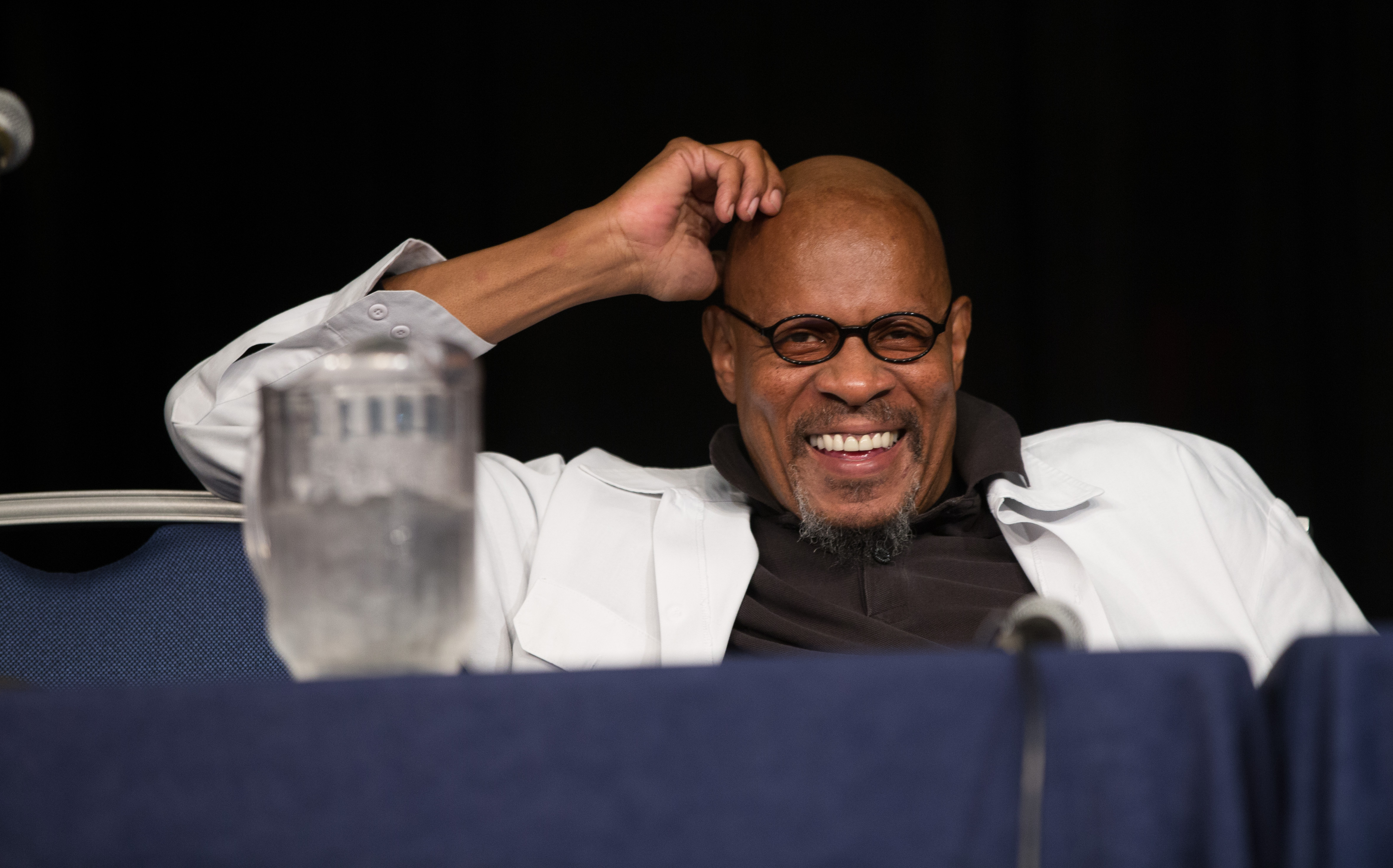
Avery Brooks both directs, and plays the role of Sisko in this episode

"The Abandoned" is the 52nd episode of the syndicated American science fiction television series Star Trek: Deep Space Nine, the sixth episode of the third season. It is directed by cast member Avery Brooks, who portrays Commander Benjamin Sisko. Brooks directed nine television episodes in this series overall. It was written by D. Thomas Maio and Steve Warnek, and aired on October 31, 1994 in syndication.

Set in the 24th century, the series follows the adventures on Deep Space Nine, a space station located near a stable wormhole between the Alpha and Gamma quadrants of the Milky Way Galaxy, near the planet Bajor. The Gamma Quadrant is home to the Dominion, a hostile empire ruled by the shape-shifting Changelings, which maintains control through its genetically-engineered soldiers, the Jem'Hadar. In this episode, an abandoned unknown alien infant found aboard the station grows into an adult Jem'Hadar (played by Bumper Robinson).

== Plot ==
An infant is found in the wreckage of a ship that the bartender Quark (Armin Shimerman) buys as salvage. The boy grows at a phenomenal rate, developing in appearance to an eight-year-old in only a few hours. Dr. Bashir (Alexander Siddig) determines that the child is the result of genetic engineering. As the boy continues to develop, his aggression, evolving appearance, and reverence for security chief Odo (a rogue Changeling) reveal that he is Jem'Hadar.

Odo (René Auberjonois) convinces Commander Sisko (Avery Brooks) that the boy should not be sent to Starfleet Command as a specimen to be studied. He believes that he can control the boy because Jem'Hadar are bred to serve the Changelings. Odo tries to show the boy, physically now a teenager, options for his life besides violence, but the boy's only drive seems to be to fight. When it is discovered that Starfleet has sent a ship to take the Jem'Hadar by force, the teen pulls a phaser and refuses to go along. Odo insists on returning the boy to the Gamma Quadrant and Sisko reluctantly agrees.

In a side plot, Commander Sisko's son Jake (Cirroc Lofton) is dating an older woman named Mardah (Jill Sayre), who is a Dabo girl at Quark's bar. Commander Sisko is very concerned and invites Mardah to dinner. Though originally intending to intervene and end the relationship, the Commander discovers through Mardah a hidden side to his son he realizes must be allowed to flourish.

== Reception ==
Reviewing the episode for Tor.com in 2013, Keith R.A. DeCandido gave it a rating of 7 out of 10, saying Brooks "directed beautifully". He described the B-plot with Jake and Mardah as "compelling" and praised Cirroc Lofton and Jill Sayre's acting performances.

== Release ==
The episode was released on June 3, 2003 in North America as part of the season 3 DVD box set. This episode was released in 2017 on DVD with the complete series 48 disc box set, which had 176 episodes and additional featurettes.

The episode was released on August 3, 1999 in the United States on LaserDisc, paired with "Second Skin". The double sided optical disc had a total runtime of 92 minutes of NTSC video.

"Second Skin" and "The Abandoned" were released on VHS in the United Kingdom on one cassette, Star Trek: Deep Space Nine 3.3 - Second Skin/The Abandoned.

== See also ==
Star Trek episodes exploring the same theme of a lone, young, alien being growing up amongst the crew:

- "The Child (Star Trek: The Next Generation)"
- "Drone (Star Trek: Voyager)"
- "I, Borg (Star Trek: The Next Generation)"
