= The Masterpiece Society =

- Star Trek: The Next Generation episode
- Episode no.: Season 5 Episode 13
- Directed by: Winrich Kolbe
- Story by: James Kahn; Adam Belanoff
- Teleplay by: Adam Belanoff; Michael Piller
- Production code: 213
- Original air date: February 10, 1992

Guest appearances
- Ron Canada - Martin Benbeck; John Snyder - Aaron Conor; Dey Young - Hannah Bates; Sheila Franklin - Felton

Episode chronology
← Previous "Violations"	Next → "Conundrum"
- Star Trek: The Next Generation season 5

"The Masterpiece Society" is the 113th episode of the American science fiction television series Star Trek: The Next Generation, the 13th episode of the fifth season.

Set in the 24th century, the series follows the adventures of the Starfleet crew of the Federation starship Enterprise-D. In this episode, the crew of the USS Enterprise saves an isolated, genetically-engineered society from immediate destruction; the cultural contamination resulting from their interaction may still ultimately doom the colony.

== Plot ==
The Enterprise has been assigned to the Moab sector to track a stellar core fragment from a disintegrated neutron star. They find the fragment is due to pass near Moab IV, threatening a human colony on the planet. On contacting the colony to arrange for evacuation, its leader Aaron Conor (John Snyder) refuses, though he allows an away team to visit to discuss the matter. Conor explains that the colony was formed 200 years prior to create a perfect society using genetic engineering and selective breeding, and he and the other leaders feel that evacuation would destroy the perfect order they have achieved. They discuss other alternatives and Enterprise Chief Engineer Geordi La Forge is introduced to Hannah Bates (Dey Young), a scientist. Bates proposes using a multi-phase tractor beam, powered by the Enterprise's warp core, to push the fragment from its path, which La Forge agrees would be a possible solution. After some deliberation, Bates is allowed to leave the colony to the Enterprise to oversee the process. Meanwhile, Deanna Troi and Conor start to develop a romantic attraction as they try to convince the other leaders that evacuation is the best option.

Aboard the Enterprise, Bates' solution is found to be effective, but the equipment required is damaged too quickly to be used. La Forge recognizes her solution could be augmented with similar technology that enables his VISOR to operate, allowing the equipment to last long enough to manipulate the fragment safely away from Moab IV. La Forge comments that this solution wouldn't be possible in the current colony's manner of perfection as imperfections like blindness would have been outright eliminated. As they continue simulations, they find that the solution is not perfect, but La Forge suggests that they reinforce the colony's shielding during the fragment's passing, allowing the colony to survive the fragment's passage. Conor initially refuses as this would require more Enterprise personnel to transport to the colony, and he fears cultural contamination, but relents when Bates convinces him this is the only solution. The Enterprise is able to push the fragment far enough that the colony appears to be safe.

As the other Enterprise crew return to the ship, La Forge and Bates check on the status of the colony’s shielding. Bates reports there are microfractures that will soon fail, and recommends full evacuation. La Forge, having not seen these on his VISOR, recognizes that Bates falsified the readings, as she wishes to leave with the Enterprise, recognizing that the colony has languished behind the technological improvements of the Federation. Admitting her lie, she requests asylum aboard the Enterprise. Several other colonists express their desire to leave. Troi brings Captain Picard to the colony to discuss the matter with Conor. Though Picard recognizes that the colony's society will be altered by agreeing to asylum, he cannot refuse this request as a fundamental right of human free will. Conor reluctantly agrees, and allows Bates and 22 other colonists to leave with the ship. As they leave orbit, Picard comments how this affair is a clear example of the necessity of the Prime Directive; the intervention of the Federation to save the colonists may have, in the end, proved just as dangerous to the colony as any core fragment could ever have been.

== Reception ==
In 2011, this episode was mentioned by Forbes in a review of Star Trek episodes that explore the implications of advanced technology, and this episode was noted for a depiction of a "genetically engineered society".
