= Second Skin (Star Trek: Deep Space Nine) =

- Star Trek: Deep Space Nine episode
- Episode no.: Season 3 Episode 5
- Directed by: Les Landau
- Written by: Robert Hewitt Wolfe
- Production code: 451
- Original air date: October 24, 1994

Guest appearances
- Andrew J. Robinson as Garak; Gregory Sierra as Corbin Entek; Lawrence Pressman as Tekeny Ghemor; Tony Papenfuss as Yeln; Cindy Katz as Yteppa; Billy Burke as Ari

Episode chronology
← Previous "Equilibrium"	Next → "The Abandoned"
- Star Trek: Deep Space Nine season 3

"Second Skin" is the 51st episode of the television series Star Trek: Deep Space Nine, the fifth episode of the third season.

Set in the 24th century, the series follows the adventures on Deep Space Nine, a space station near the planet Bajor, as the Bajorans recover from a decades-long, brutal occupation by the imperialistic Cardassians. In this episode, Bajoran officer Kira Nerys is kidnapped by the Cardassians and told she is an undercover Cardassian agent.

== Plot ==
Major Kira is contacted by Alenis Grem, a Bajoran archivist who has discovered a computer record of Kira's time in a Cardassian prison camp; Kira is naturally skeptical, as she was never in Cardassian detention, but the records appear authentic. Kira arranges a meeting with Alenis to examine the files personally and leaves for Bajor, but Alenis soon contacts the station to report that Kira never arrived. Cardassian ex-spy Garak receives information that Kira is in the custody of the Obsidian Order, the feared Cardassian intelligence agency, and passes it on to Commander Sisko.

Awakening in a darkened room, Kira is warmly welcomed "home" by Entek, a Cardassian official. When she looks in a mirror, she is shocked to see that she has been surgically altered to appear Cardassian. She furiously rejects the idea that she is Cardassian, but is introduced to Legate Tekeny Ghemor, an officer of Cardassian Central Command, who claims that she is his daughter Iliana. Entek explains that she is a sleeper agent, altered to appear Bajoran and embedded in Bajor as part of a long-term covert operation.

Ghemor is upset that his "daughter" doesn't remember him, but is reassured by Entek that her memory will return, given time. Kira is upset and incredulous, especially when she is shown the preserved body of the "real" Kira Nerys. She declares the dead girl's body a fake, but begins to doubt her own memories, especially after viewing a video message recorded by Iliana before her mission.

After several escape attempts, she is interrogated by the Obsidian Order, but she refuses to provide them with information. Eventually, Ghemor, still believing her to be his daughter, offers to help her escape the harsher interrogation she will certainly suffer at the hands of the Order, revealing himself as a member of Cardassia's underground dissident movement. In a moment of insight, Kira realizes that the entire affair — her abduction, her "Cardassian" identity, her supposedly blocked memories — were all staged in an attempt to reveal Ghemor as a dissident.

Odo, Garak, and Sisko arrive in time to prevent the Order from taking Kira and Ghemor away for punishment. Garak shoots Entek, after remarking that "treason is in this eye of the beholder." Back at Deep Space Nine, tests reveal that Kira is definitely Bajoran. Ghemor understands that she is not really Iliana, but declares that he will never stop hoping that Iliana is alive and will return to him.

== Reception ==
In 2018, Vulture rated "Second Skin" the seventh best episode of Star Trek: Deep Space Nine.

In 2018, SyFy recommend this episode for its abbreviated watch guide for the Bajoran character Kira Nerys. They note this episode for its focus on Kira and her relations with the Cardassians; she awakes to find herself captive of these aliens and also looking like one. They also note this introduces the character Tekeny Ghemor.

== Release ==
The episode was released on June 3, 2003, in North America as part of the Season 3 DVD box set. This episode was released in 2017 on DVD with the complete series box set, which had 176 episodes on 48 discs.

The episode was released on August 3, 1999, in the United States on LaserDisc, paired with "The Abandoned". The double sided optical disc had a total runtime of 92 minutes.

"Second Skin" and "Abandoned" were released on VHS in the United Kingdom on one cassette, Star Trek: Deep Space Nine 3.3 - Second Skin/The Abandoned.

== See also ==
- "Face of the Enemy (Star Trek: The Next Generation)" (S6E14, February 8, 1993; Deanna Troi in a similar situation but with the Romulans)
