= Runabout (Star Trek) =

Small starships/large shuttles in the sci fi franchise

Danube class
- The USS Yangtzee Kiang, a Danube-class runabout
- First appearance: "Emissary"
- Last appearance: "What You Leave Behind"

Information
- Affiliation: United Federation of Planets; Starfleet

General characteristics
- Armaments: 6 Type VI Phasers; 2 micro Photon torpedo launchers. (variable)
- Defenses: Deflector shields
- Propulsion: Warp drive & Impulse engines

Runabouts ("Danube-class" vessels) are a fictional class of small, multi-purpose starships appearing in the Star Trek science-fiction franchise, primarily the television series Star Trek: Deep Space Nine, which aired on syndicated television between 1993 and 1999. They served as a means of transport for the crew of the fictional space station Deep Space Nine, in the early seasons of the series enabling storylines taking place away from the station.

This spacecraft design was created primarily by Herman Zimmerman, Rick Sternbach and Jim Martin in the 1990s for Star Trek: Deep Space Nine, and later used throughout the franchise such as in books, comics, and games.

== Role in Deep Space Nine ==
The idea for a ship based on a runabout was prompted by the need to provide a way for characters to travel away from Deep Space Nine, allowing the series to feature Star Trek's themes of exploration and discovery despite being set on a stationary space station. In order to help the new show establish its own identity separate from The Next Generation, the decision was made to have something larger and more capable than the shuttlecraft seen in previous series of Star Trek.

The series bible describes the Danube-class vessels as "the symbol of the Federation presence in [Deep Space Nine's] sector". The Starfleet design elements were intended as a touch of familiarity for the characters (and in turn, the viewers) in environments dominated by alien designs and structures, specifically those of the Cardassians and Bajorans.

From the third season of DS9 onwards, much of the exploration aspect of the series was facilitated by the starship USS Defiant, which took over much of the runabouts' previous role in allowing characters to move off the station. Defiant was introduced because the producers wanted the series to enable more than two or three characters to travel away from Deep Space Nine at once, while the introduction of the Dominion as an antagonist during the second season created the in-universe requirement for a more powerful and combat-capable starship based at Deep Space Nine.

== Design and depiction ==
Overall design of the runabout was supervised by Herman Zimmerman, with Rick Sternbach and Jim Martin responsible for the design work. According to Sternbach, initial designs for the Danube class were based on the 'Spacedock Ferry' that appeared in the film Star Trek VI: The Undiscovered Country.

The Danube-class vessels are larger than shuttlecraft seen in previous series of Star Trek, but significantly smaller than previously depicted starships. The runabouts are usually named after rivers on Earth.

The hull of the Danube-class runabout is shaped roughly like a long, rectangular box. A downward-curving 'wing' is located on each side of the vessel; these start near the top of the hull, and curve down to the warp nacelles. The runabout's impulse drives are located between the wings and the vessel's body. The Deep Space Nine Technical Manual gives the runabout's dimensions as 23.1 metres (76 ft) long, 13.7 metres (45 ft) wide, and 5.4 metres (18 ft) high.

The runabouts have a two-person flight crew, and can carry two other crew. They are fitted with a two-person transporter and accommodation bunks for long missions. According to the first season episode "Dax", they were capable of speeds up to Warp 5. Although not explored in the series, background materials indicate the runabout had a modular mission payload system, where the middle section of the runabout could be swapped out for modules carrying different equipment.

=== Sets ===
The cockpit set was designed by Joseph Hodges, and constructed over a nine-week period. The set was laid out with the two flight crew facing forward and out the windows, while consoles for the two other crew have them facing the sides of the runabout. The runabout's transporter was located in the centre rear of the compartment.

A remodeling of the set occurred between the second and third seasons, with the primary change being new computer consoles around the cockpit. Another major overhaul occurred between seasons four and five, with the transporter bay moved aft behind a large door (which was usually kept open), and a free-standing console added in its place.

The set was redressed on four occasions to serve as the control areas of other vessels: a Maquis raider during "Caretaker", the pilot episode of Star Trek: Voyager, mirror universe ships in DS9 season three episode "Through the Looking Glass" and season four episode "Shattered Mirror", and a shuttlecraft from USS Enterprise-E in the film Star Trek: Insurrection.

A set for the runabout's aft living quarters was built for "Timescape", an episode in the sixth season of The Next Generation (running concurrently with DS9's first season). The set was designed by Richard James, and was funded from The Next Generation's budget, in order to take pressure off DS9's finances. Unlike the cockpit construction, design and fabrication of the aft set had to be completed in nine days. This was the only appearance of the Danube class outside of DS9, and although the set was intended for use on DS9, it was never used again to depict a runabout's interior.

=== Filming models ===
The filming model was built by Tony Meininger. Filming of the runabout was done by Image G, along with all other miniature effect work for the series.

One runabout, USS Ganges, appeared in season one episode "Past Prologue" with a 'roll-bar' mounted over the top of the ship. This roll-bar, described as containing sensor equipment, was added to the model to help viewers distinguish between Ganges and the runabout USS Yangtzee Kiang during a chase sequence.

Eight subsequent episodes of DS9 show Danube-class ships with roll-bars, including second season episode "The Maquis, Part II", where two runabouts with roll-bars are depicted flying alongside a third, without the roll-bar. A prototype for an updated runabout design, the Yellowstone class, appears in an alternate timeline depicted in the Voyager episode "Non Sequitur". This episode used stock footage from various DS9 episodes; incongruously, the runabout's destruction depicts the vessel with a roll-bar, while all previous scenes show the vessel without one.

Season six episode "One Little Ship" had a runabout carrying Jadzia Dax (Terry Farrell), Julian Bashir (Alexander Siddig), and Miles O'Brien (Colm Meaney) shrunk down to tiny size, then having to rescue the rest of the cast when Defiant is captured by the Dominion. Screenwriter René Echevarria conceived the 'little ship show' idea as a comedic filler episode early in The Next Generation's run, but despite suggesting it multiple times, did not receive the chance to go ahead until late in DS9's run. Meiniger built a new, 6-inch (150 mm)-long runabout model: dialogue in the episode specified that the runabout had shrunk to 4 inches (100 mm), but a model that small would have had problems with lighting and detail. The model was mounted on a specially built three-axis head, which allowed for easier miniature effect work than with the original filming model.

=== Computer-generated imagery model ===
The first CGI ship ever used in the Star Trek franchise was created by Dennis Blakey and Dorene Haver at VisionArt. It was a 3D computer model of the "Runabout" shuttle for Star Trek: The Next Generation. Previously, Star Trek had exclusively used physical models, which at the time were composited by Adam Howard and Steve Scott at Digital Magic. VisionArt's 3D model of the Runabout was primarily used for the stretching effect when it jumped to warp.

Star Trek: Deep Space Nine season six episode "Change of Heart" later depicted a runabout traversing an asteroid field, then landing on a planet. This was the first episode in which runabout sequences were done completely with computer-generated imagery: complex scenes where the ship weaved through the dense asteroid field were achieved without weeks of miniature effect work, and camera movements during the landing sequence allowed the runabout to be shown from multiple angles in the same scene, as there was no need to conceal a 'mounting point' for the miniature. The CGI model for the Danube class was developed by Digital Muse.

== Appearances ==
=== Danube class ===
Named ships not known to be destroyed are in boldface

Name	Registry	Depiction	Fate	Named for
**USS Danube**	NX-72003	First ship of the class. Mentioned in Star Trek: Deep Space Nine Technical Manual.		Notable river in Central Europe.
USS Gander	NCC-73624	Taken by Ezri Dax to search for Worf.	Destroyed by the Jem'Hadar.	River in Canada or river in France
USS Ganges	NCC-72454	Captured Tahna Los. Rescued Vash from the Gamma Quadrant.	Destroyed by a T'Lani Munitions Cruiser.	Notable river in India
USS Mekong	NCC-72617	Helps rescue Benjamin Sisko from the Jem'Hadar.	Abandoned during the Obsidian Order/Tal Shiar attack on the Founder's homeworld in the Omarian Nebula, presumably destroyed.	Notable river in Southeast Asia
USS Orinoco	NCC-72905	Helps rescue Benjamin Sisko from the Jem'Hadar.	Destroyed by the Cardassian terrorist group The True Way.	River in South America
**USS Rio Grande**	NCC-72452	Vessel aboard which Jadzia Dax and Benjamin Sisko discover the Bajoran wormhole. Later located the missing Sword of Kahless. Helps rescue Sisko from the Jem'Hadar.	Longest surviving DS9 runabout.	Major river in North America
USS Rubicon	NCC-72936	Added to Deep Space Nine's fleet in episode ”Family Business” to replace Mekong. Shrunk to 6.5 centimeters in episode ”One Little Ship”.	Abandoned, and presumably destroyed, in episode ”The Die is Cast”.	River in Italy famous as boundary crossed by Julius Caesar on his march to Rome
USS Shenandoah	NCC-73024	Taken by Jadzia Dax and Worf to rescue a Cardassian informant from the Dominion.	Severely damaged by the Jem'Hadar, and presumably destroyed, en route to deliver diplomatic message to Grand Nagus Zek.	Eponymous river of the Shenandoah Valley in the United States
**USS Volga**	NCC-73196	Participates in botanical survey of Torad IV.	unknown	Longest and largest river in Europe
USS Yangtzee Kiang	NCC-72453	Hijacked by Bajoran terrorist Tahna Los.	Became the first DS9 runabout to be destroyed when it crashed on a moon in the Gamma Quadrant.	Longest river in Asia
USS Yukon	NCC-74602	Stolen by Founder in failed attempt to destroy the Bajoran sun.	Destroyed by USS Defiant.	Major river in northwestern North America
Unknown	Unknown	Transports Enterprise-D staffers to and from conference.	Destroyed blocking power transfer between Enterprise and a Romulan warbird.	
Unknown	Unknown	-	Destroyed in orbit of Torga IV with the loss of all hands.	
Unknown	Unknown	-	Destroyed on Ajilon Prime during the Klingon bombardment of the Federation colony.	
Unknown	Unknown	-	Destroyed by a Cardassian soldier at Empok Nor.	
Unknown	Unknown	Used by the Cardassian Liberation Front en route to stealing a Breen weapon.	unknown	

=== Yellowstone class (alternate reality) ===
Name	Registry	Depiction	Fate	Named for
USS Yellowstone	NX-74751	Prototype for an advanced runabout designed in large part by Ensign Harry Kim and Lieutenant Laska in an alternate timeline.	Destroyed by antimatter containment loss.	A river in the western United States, also the first national park and a volcano

== Disposability ==
A large number of runabouts are damaged or destroyed over the course of the series. In the third-season episode "Family Business", Kira Nerys (Nana Visitor) quips, "The rate we go through runabouts, it's a good thing the Earth has so many rivers" (referencing the naming tradition of the Danube-class vessels), and in Star Trek 101, authors Terry Erdmann and Paula Block comment that the series "goes through runabouts like potato chips".

The show's art department joked that any runabout travel should be done on the USS Rio Grande, referring to its distinction as the only Danube-class ship to survive the entire seven-season run of DS9, and therefore the safest one. It appeared in the series pilot "Emissary", the final episode "What You Leave Behind", and eighteen other episodes in between.

== Merchandise ==
- In 1993, AMT/Ertl released a 1:72 scale model kit for the runabout USS Rio Grande. During the filming of season two, one of these models was put together by the show's art department for a miniature effect shot where a runabout exploded, instead of having to assemble, then destroy, a more-expensive filming model. Later, the company released a 1:2500 scale model of Deep Space Nine itself, which included three runabouts to place on the station's landing pads.
- In 1994, Playmates Toys released a "Runabout Orinoco" playset, in which two of Playmates' 4.5 inches (110 mm) action figures could be seated.
- A runabout was amongst the Star Trek Micro Machines produced by Galoob. As well as the standard toy, bronzed and silvered versions have been released in collectors' sets.
- Several 'ship' cards from Decipher, Inc.'s Star Trek Customizable Card Game depicted Danube-class ships. A generic Runabout card (based on the appearance in The Next Generation) was included in the original set, with named runabouts appearing in subsequent sets.
- Runabouts appear in several incarnations in the Star Trek Online massively multiplayer online role-playing game. Danube and Yellowstone classes appear as both playable 'small craft' starships and as decorative non-combat pets to be displayed when using larger starships. The Danube-class starship and pet correspond to the DS9 appearance, with the roll bar equipped. However, the Yellowstone runabouts have a different visual design to the ship's appearance in Star Trek: Voyager.

== Reception ==
In 2017, CBR ranked the runabout the fifteenth most powerful spacecraft of Star Trek: Deep Space Nine. They note they were an important vessel in the television show early on before the arrival of the USS Defiant spacecraft. They felt they were a big upgrade over smaller shuttlecraft of the period, and while they land the occasionally lucky shot against larger starships, they were no match for them in general.

== See also ==
- Star Trek: The Next Generation
- Star Trek: Deep Space Nine
- Star Trek: Voyager
