= Evil twin =

Archetype

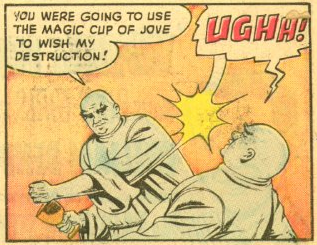
Mr Keeper fights his evil twin in a 1948 Kid Eternity comic

The evil twin is an antagonist found in many different genres of fiction. The twin is physically nearly identical to the protagonist, but with a radically inverted morality. In films, they may have a symbolic physical difference from the protagonist—such as a goatee, eyepatch, scar, distinctive clothing, or a more muscular build—which makes it easy for the audience to visually identify the two characters. Sometimes, however, the physical differences between the characters will be minimized, so as to confuse the audience. Both roles are almost always played by either the same actor or the actor's actual twin (if the actor has one).

Though there may be moral disparity between actual biological twins, the term is more often used figuratively: the two look-alikes are not actually twins, but physical duplicates produced by other phenomena (e.g. alternate universes). In other cases, the so-called "evil" twin is a dual opposite to their "good" counterpart, possessing at least some commonality with the value system of the protagonist.

== Origins ==
=== Mythologic precursors ===
The concept of evil twins is ancient and mythical. One of the earliest may be in the Zurvanite branch of Zoroastrianism. This sect distilled the general abstract duality of Zoroastrianism into a concept of manifest twins "born" of a monist (first) principle Zurvan (Time). In this cosmological model, the twins—Ahura Mazda (Ormuzd) and Angra Mainyu (Ahriman)—were co-eternal representatives of good and evil. Ahura Mazda, representing good, was eventually expected to win the battle. The doctrinal foundation of Zurvanism lies in its interpretation of the Zoroastrian precepts of Free Will: Like Mazdaism (the other, and still extant branch of Zoroastrianism), Zurvanism emphasized that mortals always "have a choice between good and evil, and that one is always free to make the choice one way or the other." Zurvanism took this one step further and considered Angra Mainyu "evil" by choice, rather than by nature. This characterization is important to modern uses of the "evil twin", as most examples are in fact opposites of their "good twin", rather than wholly evil.

Amongst the Mandika of southern Mali, the origin of the world is also attributed to twins, albeit fraternal ones. According to this legend, Mangala, or God, twice tried to create the world with seeds. The first attempt failed because he had but one seed. On his second attempt, Mangala used four sets of twin seeds. This experiment was more satisfactory, and soon a universe was growing within a cosmic egg. Ultimately, however, one of the male twins, Pemba, grew tired of being confined. In attempting to escape, he proved himself treacherous. The rip he caused in the cosmic egg begat the Earth. It also compelled Mangala to seek a sacrifice of atonement. For this, Mangala killed Pemba's innocent fraternal twin, Faro. When Faro's remains were scattered on the newly formed Earth, fertile land was formed. Thus the Earth as we know it is the result of the treason of the evil twin and the sacrifice of the good one.

Many Native American creation myths likewise provide for the role of dualistic twins.

=== Early fictional appearances ===
==== Literature ====
In literature, Beowulf has been cited as an early example of the evil twin story. Although it does not feature biological twins or even characters that seem to have similar appearances, the precise parallel language suggests that the monsters are evil reflections of the hero.

==== Film ====
A notable early use of the modern concept of evil twins in film is 1939's The Man in the Iron Mask. This adaptation of a part of the novel The Vicomte de Bragelonne by Alexandre Dumas made a key change to the source material by suggesting that the plot's central twins were in fact opposites of each other. Louis XIV is portrayed as the evil twin of Philippe, a boy raised by d'Artagnan and The Three Musketeers. The movie contains many of the common tropes of the evil twin plot, such as the fact that Phillippe is unaware of his twin's existence, differences in upbringing being important to the twins' adult temperaments, facial hair as a way for the audience to distinguish between the twins, one twin impersonating the other, and the eventual triumph of the good twin.

Evil twins were also staples of serial films. They were crucial plot devices in the initial 1937 Dick Tracy storyline and the 1941 Jungle Girl serial. In the 1937 serial, Gordon Tracy was introduced as Dick's twin brother. Gordon underwent an evil scientist's procedure which rendered him evil and physically transformed. For the majority of the story he and Dick were played by different actors, but it is understood that he was intended as a twin. In the case of Jungle Girl, it is not the titular character who has the twin, but her father. She is raised in the wilds of Africa, according to the narrative, because her uncle drives her father into exile there when she is a young girl. Later, after she has grown into a young woman, she stops her uncle's plan to illegally remove diamonds from the continent.

However, just as in the modern era, early film usages were not confined to action-adventure stories. Charlie Chaplin's The Great Dictator was a 1940 comedic evil twin story that worked on two levels. In the narrative itself, Chaplin played both a good, simple barber and his evil counterpart, a Hitler-esque dictator. But it was also born of the notion that Chaplin himself actually looked like Hitler. As a modern reviewer has noted:

The notion of these two brilliant and spectacularly successful monomaniacal over-achievers existing simultaneously like some Good Twin/Evil Twin duality, watching each other ascend to dominance as living iconic images, then "meeting" in a David-Goliath match playing on movie screens internationally ... you couldn't pitch that story line to Hollywood even as an X-Men flick.

— Mark Bourne, in his review of the 2003 DVD release of The Great Dictator

==== Comic books ====
Comic books contain some other early appearances of evil twins. One example, still available on the market today, is King Ottokar's Sceptre by Hergé which originally was published in 1938–39. Tintin is hired as Professor Alembick's secretary and flies with him to Syldavia. The real Alembick has been abducted in the beginning of the story, and unknown to Tintin replaced by an antagonist, in a plan to steal the sceptre. In the end of the story Tintin understands the impostor was the evil twin of the professor.

Another example is found in September 1948's Kid Eternity #11. The final story in the work revolves around "Handsome Harry", the evil twin of Kid Eternity's mentor, Mr. Keeper. Handsome Harry is the archetypal evil twin in that he is both evil and a biological twin.

The cover of 1968's Wonder Woman #175, which explicitly references the "Evil Twin".

The concept was brought to the more iconic superhero, Superman, about a decade later. 1958's Bizarro was at first Superboy's evil twin. This twin was easily distinguishable both in deformed physical appearance and manner of speech. Bizarro, more anti-Superman than evil, nevertheless "represented Superman's Jungian shadow, his dark side". In DC Comics, evil doppelgangers of various superheroes reside on Earth-Three, such as Superman and Batman's evil counterparts, Ultraman and Owlman, respectively.

Although the Kid Eternity story has had the term retroactively applied to it, none of these examples originally used words "evil twin" explicitly. 1968's Wonder Woman #175 is thus important for being an early case of the term appearing on a comic cover.

==== Television ====
While evil twins are inextricably linked to the soap opera (one particularly long-running "evil twin" soap opera storyline was on All My Children, where David Canary played evil twin Adam Chandler and good twin Stuart Chandler for nearly 30 years), they have appeared in most televised genres. Some of the earliest usages were in fact in westerns. Two episodes entitled “Deadly Image” appeared within a year of each other on two different westerns. Maverick's version appeared in March 1961, followed swiftly by The Rifleman's take in February 1962. Beyond the coincidence of name, both offered similar plots: the hero becomes confused with a look-alike criminal, and the guilt of the hero must be cleared by demonstrating that the evil twin is a separate individual.

== Tropes ==
The evil twin has now been used with great enough frequency to become viewed with cynicism as a hackneyed concept. As the character of Kate Austen remarked in a deleted scene from Lost: "It's not a soap opera until somebody's evil twin shows up." However, within the concept of the evil twin there are characteristics which are themselves tropes.

=== The goatee ===
The biggest of these distinguishing traits is the goatee. Famously used by the "Mirror Universe" version of Star Trek character Spock, in the episode "Mirror, Mirror", it was an easy way for audiences to tell "good" Spock from "evil" Spock (the character, while more ruthlessly logical than his counterpart, is far from evil). The presence of a goatee on a familiar character is now seen as an immediate clue that the character is an evil twin. Even writers not discussing evil twins in their literary sense have occasionally made reference to the goatee through quick metaphor:

You can't go to the evil twin school of plotting very often if you're hack writing your way through Hollywood, but once you do it's thankfully easy. You slap a goatee on somebody (evil Spock, Evil David Hasselhoff) and voila: evil twin goodness. The rest of the story, I am told, writes itself. So if you're a Hollywood writer and you can only go to the well once or twice in the life of the show, how come Microsoft can be evil and Apple be angelic ALL of the time? And even worse, why is Microsoft defying convention and refusing to use a Mac logo with a goatee?

— Chris Seibold, writing about the relationship between Apple and Microsoft.

The Evil Overlord List refers to it with Item 35: "I will not grow a goatee. In the old days they made you look diabolic. Now they just make you look like a disaffected member of Generation X."

== General usage ==
=== Type of doppelgänger ===
In modern use, evil twin and one sense of the word doppelgänger have come to be virtually interchangeable. While "evil twin" does not connote the sense of "supernatural harbinger of death", it can be used to mean "a physical copy of one's self who has an altered morality".

If you watch enough daytime soap operas, then you already know the horrifying truth: Everyone on earth has an evil twin (or doppelgänger, if you will) roaming around and acting like a jerk. These doppelgängers are the ones who sleep with your best friend's boyfriend, steal prescription medication out of your bathroom cabinet, and spread vicious (and only partially true) rumors about your sexual proclivities. You have a doppelgänger, your dog has a doppelgänger, and your mom has a doppelgänger. Everybody has a doppelgänger—except for me. As it turns out, I'm someone else's doppelgänger.

— Steven Humphrey, in an article from Seattle-based The Stranger

=== As metaphor ===
The term evil twin has also passed into general usage in a variety of different contexts. In computer technology, it describes a faked wireless access point designed to appear like a genuine one, for the purpose of phishing information from unsuspecting users. The term is further used in contemporary journalism and non-fiction as a convenient label. In astronomy, Venus is often called Earth's "evil twin", in reference to the similarity, yet opposition, of the two bodies.
