= Crossover (Star Trek: Deep Space Nine) =

- Star Trek: Deep Space Nine episode
- Episode no.: Season 2 Episode 23
- Directed by: David Livingston
- Story by: Peter Allan Fields
- Teleplay by: Peter Allan Fields; Michael Piller
- Production code: 443
- Original air date: May 16, 1994

Guest appearances
- Andrew J. Robinson as Garak; John Cothran Jr. as Telok

Episode chronology
← Previous "The Wire"	Next → "The Collaborator"
- Star Trek: Deep Space Nine season 2

"Crossover" is the 43rd episode of the science fiction television series Star Trek: Deep Space Nine, and the 23rd episode of the second season. This episode was written by Peter Allan Fields and Michael Piller, and directed by David Livingston. It aired on broadcast television on May 16, 1994.

Set in the 24th century, the series follows the adventures on Deep Space Nine, a space station located adjacent to a stable wormhole between the Alpha and Gamma quadrants of the Milky Way Galaxy, near the planet Bajor. In this episode, first officer Kira and Doctor Bashir have an adventure in Star Trek's Mirror Universe, a parallel universe setting introduced in the episode "Mirror, Mirror" of the original Star Trek series. It is the first of five Deep Space Nine episodes to involve the Mirror Universe.

== Plot ==
After experiencing operational difficulties while traveling through the wormhole, Major Kira and Dr. Bashir find themselves in an alternate universe populated by exact doubles of the people in their own universe. In this universe, the wormhole is unknown, and Terrans (i.e., humans) are slaves; Deep Space Nine is a mining station run by the Intendant, Kira's counterpart, with Garak as her second in command and Odo overseeing the Terran slaves. As Bashir is sent to work in ore-processing, the Intendant tells Kira about James Kirk's visit to this universe a century ago; that incident led to the formation of a powerful alliance between the Klingons, Cardassians and Bajorans, and the eventual conquest of the Terrans.

Bashir tries to talk Miles O'Brien, a fellow slave, into configuring the transporters to help Kira and Bashir return home, but the beaten, put-upon O'Brien is unwilling to risk the wrath of his superiors. Meanwhile, Kira almost succeeds in securing help from the bartender Quark, but he is arrested and executed by Garak for helping Terrans escape the station. Kira meets Benjamin Sisko's Mirror Universe counterpart, who receives better treatment than the other Terrans for carrying out piracy on behalf of the Klingon-Cardassian alliance.

The Intendant assures Kira that she has nothing to fear, and suggests they should become closer. Later, Garak tells Kira that he intends to kill the Intendant, and that he will let Kira and Bashir escape if she impersonates the Intendant and yields power to Garak; Bashir will be killed if she does not comply.

Kira tells Bashir they must find a way back to their runabout and make their escape through the wormhole. She tries to recruit Sisko's aid, but he is unmoved. That night, Garak prepares to put his plan into effect at a lavish party thrown by the Intendant. Meanwhile, an accident at the ore-processing plant gives Bashir the opportunity to escape, killing Odo in the process.

Bashir convinces O'Brien to help, but the two are captured and brought to face the Intendant, who sentences them to death. O'Brien makes an impassioned speech, telling the assembled crowd what Bashir has revealed about a universe where Terrans have respect and dignity. His words move Sisko, who turns on the Intendant and helps Kira and Bashir to escape. The two return to their universe, leaving Sisko and O'Brien's counterparts to fight for the rights of Terrans in their own world.

== Continuity ==
This was the first of five mirror universe episodes of Star Trek: Deep Space Nine: "Crossover", "Through the Looking Glass", "Shattered Mirror", "Resurrection", and "The Emperor's New Cloak".

The mirror universe version of Odo wears a belt on his uniform. Rene Auberjonois liked the effect so much that he began wearing the belt while playing regular Odo as well.

== Reception ==
A 2015 binge-watching guide for Star Trek: Deep Space Nine by Wired recommended not skipping this essential episode.

In 2016, The Hollywood Reporter rated "Crossover" the 78th-best episode of all Star Trek episodes. They note that this episode references the events in the Mirror Universe that occurred in the episode "Mirror, Mirror" and that this enhances the episode.

In 2017, SyFy ranked this the second best Mirror Universe episode of Star Trek of the seven that had aired at the time.

In 2020, io9 listed this as one of the "must-watch" episodes of Star Trek: Deep Space Nine.

In 2020, the U.K. science fiction magazine and website SciFiNow ranked this one of the top ten episodes of Star Trek: Deep Space Nine, noting that actress Nana Visitor seemed to have fun playing her evil twin from the mirror universe.

== Releases ==
This was released on VHS with "Collaborator" on one VHS cassette, Star Trek: Deep Space Nine Vol. 22 - Crossover/The Collaborator.

On April 1, 2003, Season 2 of Star Trek: Deep Space Nine was released on DVD video discs, with 26 episodes on seven discs.

This episode was part of the Alternate Realities Fan Collective, and included a commentary by episode director David Livingston.

This episode was released in 2017 on DVD with the complete series box set, which had 176 episodes on 48 discs.
