= Star Trek: Shattered Universe =

2004 video game

- Developer: Starsphere Interactive
- Publisher: TDK Mediactive
- Designers: Andrew Iverson; Henrik Markarian; Thomas Howell
- Composers: Barry Fasman; John O'Kennedy
- Platforms: PlayStation 2, Xbox
- Release: NA: January 13, 2004 (PS2); NA: January 14, 2004 (Xbox); PAL: April 30, 2004
- Genre: Space combat simulator
- Mode: Single-player

Star Trek: Shattered Universe is a space-combat simulator video game by American studio Starsphere Interactive set in the Star Trek Mirror Universe, as portrayed in the original series episode "Mirror, Mirror". Originally intended to be one of the last Star Trek titles released by Interplay Entertainment, it sat for 2 years before being completed by TDK Mediactive; it was released for the Xbox and PlayStation 2. The player takes control of one-man fighter spacecraft and engages in several missions.

== Plot ==
In the game, Captain Hikaru Sulu and the crew of the USS Excelsior swap places with the crew of the mirror universe ISS Excelsior as a result of a localized stellar ion storm. They are hunted by Mirror-Chekov, who commands the ISS Enterprise-A, and assisted by the Klingons and Romulans. During their trek home, the Excelsior crew encounter mirror universe variations of the original series' missions, including the M5 multitronic computer (The Ultimate Computer), Balok (The Corbomite Maneuver), the giant space amoeba (The Immunity Syndrome), and the Planet Killer (The Doomsday Machine). This trek across the mirror universe culminates with a battle against Mirror Sulu who went through a similar journey in the Prime universe with less than stellar results.

=== Time frame ===
While the game takes place at some point during the era of the Star Trek films, it is unclear exactly when. The Enterprise-A has not yet been decommissioned (despite the fact that the order to return to Spacedock for decommissioning was given on Stardate 9529.1-this is in the short scene in 'our' universe-and Sulu's first log was on Stardate 9585.9), but Sulu is in command of the Excelsior, placing the game somewhere in the time frame after Star Trek VI: The Undiscovered Country (Sulu does reference the events of the film in one of the cutscenes, placing the game after the film). However, in the mirror universe, Spock has not yet completed his coup d'état—the Empire contacts Mirror-Chekov several times during his mission to capture Sulu—but there is still much time for that to occur in the mirror universe timeline. Additionally, James T. Kirk is nowhere to be seen.

== Reception ==
Reception

Aggregate score
Aggregator	Score	
Aggregator	PS2	Xbox
Metacritic	42/100	41/100

Review scores
Publication	Score	
Publication	PS2	Xbox
Computer Games Magazine	1/4	1/4
Electronic Gaming Monthly	3/10	3/10
Game Informer	N/A	5.5/10
GameRevolution	F	F
GameSpot	4.4/10	4.4/10
GameSpy	1/5	1/5
GameZone	7.4/10	5.5/10
IGN	3.9/10	3.9/10
Official U.S. PlayStation Magazine	2/5	N/A
Official Xbox Magazine (US)	N/A	6/10
X-Play	N/A	1/5

The game received "generally unfavorable reviews" on both platforms according to the review aggregation website Metacritic. It has twice been ranked as one of the worst Star Trek games ever, first by Kotaku in 2009, and by Den of Geek in 2016.
