= Felecia M. Bell =

American actress

Felecia Bell
- Occupation: Television actress
- Years active: 1988–2007
- Known for: Jennifer Sisko (Star Trek: Deep Space Nine); Glynnis Turner (Days of Our Lives); Simone Hardy (General Hospital)

Felecia M. Bell is a former American actress best known for her roles in Days of Our Lives and General Hospital, as well as her portrayal of Jennifer Sisko in Star Trek: Deep Space Nine. She also starred in the first season of the series Night Man. After retiring from acting in 2007, Bell became a holistic nutritionist.

== Life and career ==
Bell's first role was in a 1988 episode of Hunter. Following Hunter, Bell next was seen in the TV miniseries The Great Los Angeles Earthquake as Matubu's secretary. Later on in 1990, she would land the role of Glynnis Turner on Days of Our Lives. From December 1993 to July 1996, Bell was the third – and final – actress to play Dr. Simone Hardy on General Hospital In 1994, Bell appeared in Babyfever, her only feature film role. Bell would later go on to have roles in several different series, including three episodes of Star Trek: Deep Space Nine as Jennifer Sisko. She starred as Jessica Rodgers in the first season (1997–98) of the superhero series Night Man. Her last role was in a 2007 episode of Law & Order.

As of May 2011, Bell was a holistic nutritionist, operating a service called Walk In Health, in Bayonne, New Jersey.

== Filmography ==
=== Film ===
Year	Title	Role
1994	Babyfever	Carla

=== Television ===
Year	Title	Role	Notes
1988	Hunter	Carol Winters	Episode: "Naked Justice, part 1" (S 4:Ep 14)
1990	The Great Los Angeles Earthquake	Motubu's Secretary	Miniseries
1990–1992	Days of Our Lives	Glynnis Turner	Recurring
1991	Family Matters	Woman	Episode: "Busted" (S 2:Ep 19)
1993–1996	General Hospital	Dr. Simone Hardy	Contract Role
1993	Star Trek: Deep Space Nine	Jennifer Sisko	Episode: "Emissary" (two-part series premiere)
1995, 1996	Star Trek: Deep Space Nine	Mirror Universe Jennifer Sisko	Episodes: "Through the Looking Glass", "Shattered Mirror"
1996	Every Woman's Dream	Lauren, Liz's Flatmate	TV movie (as Felicia Bell)
1997–1998	Night Man	Jessica Rodgers	Main cast (season 1)
1997	Sparks	Guest Star	Episode: "Won't You Be My Neighbor" (S 1:Ep 15)
1998	ER	Janna Mikami	Episode: "The Miracle Worker" ( S 5:Ep 10)
1999	Any Day Now	Trina	Episode: "It's A Man's World" ( S 2:Ep 3)
2001	JAG	Katherine Tindle	Episode: "Past Tense" ( S 6:Ep 21)
2002	The Agency	Angela	Episode: "French Kiss" (as Felecia Bell-Schafer)
2004	Smallville	Judge Abigail Ross	Episode: "Whisper" (as Felecia Bell-Schafer)
2006	Law & Order: Special Victims Unit	Mrs. Oliver	Episode: "Fault" (S 7:EP 19)
2007	Law & Order	Dr. Maggie Havens	Episode: "Remains of the Day" (S 17:Ep 11)
