= Through the Looking Glass (Star Trek: Deep Space Nine) =

- Star Trek: Deep Space Nine episode
- Episode no.: Season 3 Episode 19
- Directed by: Winrich Kolbe
- Written by: Ira Steven Behr; Robert Hewitt Wolfe
- Production code: 466
- Original air date: April 17, 1995

Guest appearances
- Felecia M. Bell as Jennifer Sisko; Andrew J. Robinson as Garak; Tim Russ as Tuvok; Max Grodénchik as Rom

Episode chronology
← Previous "Distant Voices"	Next → "Improbable Cause"
- Star Trek: Deep Space Nine season 3

"Through the Looking Glass" is the 65th episode of the television show Star Trek: Deep Space Nine, the 19th episode of the third season.

Set in the 24th century, the series follows the adventures of the crew of the space station Deep Space Nine. This episode takes place mostly in the Mirror Universe, a parallel universe that is home to more aggressive, mistrustful, and opportunistic doppelgangers of the regular characters of the Star Trek universe, governed by a brutal alliance of the Cardassian and Klingon races. In this episode, Deep Space Nine's captain Benjamin Sisko must assume the role of his dead counterpart in order to save the mirror version of his late wife.

== Plot ==
Sisko is abducted and taken to the Mirror Universe, which Kira Nerys and Julian Bashir visited the year before, by Miles O'Brien's Mirror Universe counterpart. This O'Brien explains that Sisko's counterpart, the leader of the Terran (i.e., human) rebellion against the Klingon–Cardassian Alliance, has been killed. Jennifer Sisko, the Mirror counterpart of Sisko's late wife, is a scientist working for the Alliance, building a device that will allow the Alliance to discover the rebels' headquarters; Sisko must impersonate his counterpart and convince Jennifer to join the rebels, or the rebels will have to kill her. Unwilling to let Jennifer die again, Sisko agrees to intervene. He meets the rebels, including Mirror counterparts of Bashir, Rom, Jadzia Dax, and Tuvok.

Terok Nor, the Mirror Deep Space Nine, is a brutal Alliance mining station run on Terran slave labor, ruled by Intendant Kira. Jennifer Sisko, who despises her ex-husband, is working under Kira's supervision, believing that the bloodshed against the Terrans will end once her device is completed. Rom, seemingly betraying the rebellion, informs Kira that Benjamin Sisko is alive, enabling Alliance forces to capture him and O'Brien and take them to Terok Nor.

Kira sends O'Brien to ore processing with the slaves, and takes Sisko to her quarters. When Sisko meets Jennifer, he apologizes for his counterpart's past treatment of her, and tries to convince her that the Alliance is her real enemy. Sensing he may be winning her confidence, Sisko signals O'Brien using communicators concealed under their skin. In ore processing, O'Brien receives the signal and causes a malfunction that allows him and the Terran slaves to escape. Meanwhile, Jennifer agrees to leave with Sisko; they meet O'Brien and head for a waiting ship.

Before they can escape, however, they are cornered by Kira and her troops, who have killed Rom upon realizing that he was a double agent working for Sisko. Sisko and his group retreat to the ore processing center and seal themselves within. When Kira and her soldiers force their way in, Sisko tells her that he has activated the station's self-destruct sequence, which only he can stop. Kira reluctantly agrees to let Sisko, Jennifer, O'Brien, and the Terrans go free in order to halt the imminent destruction. Back at the rebel encampment, Jennifer admits to having realized that he's not really her husband. She kisses Sisko goodbye before he returns to his universe.

== Continuity ==
The Mirror Universe was first introduced to Star Trek in "Mirror, Mirror", an episode of Star Trek: The Original Series which aired on October 6, 1967.

"Through the Looking Glass" is the second of five Mirror Universe episodes of Star Trek: Deep Space Nine; the others are "Crossover", "Shattered Mirror", "Resurrection", and "The Emperor's New Cloak". The mirror Jennifer Sisko returns in "Shattered Mirror".

== Reception ==
Reviewing the episode for Tor.com in 2013, Keith R.A. DeCandido gave the episode a rating of 6 out of 10; he described the episode as "fun to watch", but found Felecia M. Bell's performance as Jennifer disappointing, which in his opinion weakened the emotional impact of the story. Zack Handlen, reviewing the episode for The A.V. Club in 2012, similarly described the episode as "fun", but found the Mirror Universe as a concept to be "wearing a bit thin", and also considered Bell's performance bland.

In 2017, SyFy ranked this the third best Mirror Universe episode of Star Trek.

== Releases ==
This episode was released on LaserDisc in Japan on October 2, 1998, in the half-season collection 3rd Season Vol. 2. The set included episodes from "Destiny" to "The Adversary" on double sided 12 inch optical discs; the box set had a total runtime of 552 minutes and included audio tracks in English and Japanese.

This episode was released on VHS paired with "Improbable Cause".

== See also ==
- "Shattered Mirror" (Continues the Mirror Universe narrative)
