= Shattered Mirror (Star Trek: Deep Space Nine) =

- Star Trek: Deep Space Nine episode
- Episode no.: Season 4 Episode 20
- Directed by: James L. Conway
- Written by: Ira Steven Behr; Hans Beimler
- Production code: 492
- Original air date: April 22, 1996

Guest appearances
- Andrew J. Robinson as Garak; Aron Eisenberg as Nog; Felecia M. Bell as Jennifer Sisko; Carlos Carrasco as Klingon Officer

Episode chronology
← Previous "Hard Time"	Next → "The Muse"
- Star Trek: Deep Space Nine season 4

"Shattered Mirror" is the 92nd episode of the television series Star Trek: Deep Space Nine, the 20th episode of the fourth season. It was written by Ira Steven Behr and Hans Beimler and achieved a Nielsen rating of 6.5 points when it originally premiered.

Set in the 24th century, the series follows the adventures of the crew of the space station Deep Space Nine. This is one of several episodes of the series to feature the Mirror Universe, a parallel universe that is home to more aggressive, mistrustful, and opportunistic doppelgangers of the regular characters of the Star Trek universe, governed by a brutal alliance of the Cardassian and Klingon races. This episode follows up on the events of the third season's "Through the Looking Glass", in which Deep Space Nine's captain Benjamin Sisko met the Mirror Universe double of his late wife Jennifer; in this episode, Jennifer takes Benjamin's son Jake to the Mirror Universe to lure Benjamin back there as well.

Actress Felecia M. Bell returns to play Jennifer. This episode marks the first appearance of the Mirror Universe counterpart of Worf, played by Michael Dorn, who was added to the Deep Space Nine cast at the beginning of the fourth season.

== Plot ==
Jake Sisko is astonished to find that the Mirror Universe doppelganger of Jennifer Sisko, his late mother, is visiting Deep Space Nine. Jennifer kidnaps Jake back to the Mirror Universe, and Captain Benjamin Sisko must travel there to retrieve his son. Benjamin learns that he was lured to the Mirror Universe to help the Mirror Miles O'Brien prepare their version of the starship Defiant for battle against the Klingon-Cardassian Alliance, in what could mean freedom for the enslaved Terrans (i.e., humans). By this time, the Terrans have taken Terok Nor (the Mirror DS9), and captured the Intendant (Mirror Kira Nerys). They are preparing to defend against a recapture by the Alliance forces led by the Regent (Mirror Worf). Meanwhile, Jake bonds with Jennifer, seeing her as a second chance to have a relationship with his mother. With Benjamin Sisko in command, the rebels' Defiant wins the battle and forces the Regent to retreat. However, during the fight, the Intendant is released by Mirror Nog. In her escape, she kills Mirror Nog and Mirror Jennifer, leaving Jake beside her body, and the Siskos, father and son, must grieve the loss of Jennifer once more.

== Continuity ==
The Mirror Universe was first introduced to Star Trek in "Mirror, Mirror", an episode of Star Trek: The Original Series which aired on October 6, 1967.

"Shattered Mirror" is the third of five Mirror Universe episodes of Star Trek: Deep Space Nine; the others are "Crossover", "Through the Looking Glass", "Resurrection", and "The Emperor's New Cloak".

== Reception ==
In 2017, SyFy ranked this the fourth best of the seven Mirror Universe episodes of the Star Trek franchise aired by that date.
