= Mirror, Mirror (Star Trek: The Original Series) =

- Star Trek: The Original Series episode
- Episode no.: Season 2 Episode 4
- Directed by: Marc Daniels
- Written by: Jerome Bixby
- Cinematography by: Jerry Finnerman
- Production code: 039
- Original air date: October 6, 1967

Guest appearances
- BarBara Luna (credited as Barbara Luna) – Lt. Marlena Moreau; John Winston – Transporter Chief Kyle; Vic Perrin – Tharn; Eddie Paskey – Lt. Leslie; William Blackburn – Lt. Hadley; Roger Holloway – Lt. Lemli; Pete Kellett – Kirk's Henchman; Garth Pillsbury – Wilson; Bob Bass – Chekov's Henchman; Bobby Clark – Chekov's Henchman #2

Episode chronology
← Previous "The Changeling"	Next → "The Apple"
- Star Trek: The Original Series season 2

"Mirror, Mirror" is the fourth episode of the second season of the American science fiction television series Star Trek. Written by Jerome Bixby and directed by Marc Daniels, it was first broadcast on October 6, 1967.

The episode involves a transporter malfunction that swaps Captain Kirk and his companions with their evil counterparts from a parallel universe (later dubbed the "Mirror Universe").

"Mirror, Mirror" is one of the most celebrated episodes of the original Star Trek series, and the Mirror Universe was revisited in episodes of later Star Trek series.

== Plot ==
After failing to persuade the Halkan Council to allow the Federation to mine dilithium crystals on their planet, Captain Kirk, along with Chief Medical Officer Dr. McCoy, Chief Engineer Scott, and Communications Officer Uhura, attempt to beam back to the USS Enterprise during an ion storm, and find themselves on a dramatically different Enterprise designated "ISS Enterprise." First Officer Spock now has a mustache and goatee, sidearms are standard issue, and the ship belongs to an empire rather than the Federation. After inquiring about the status of the mission, Spock orders the bridge crew to prepare a phaser barrage on the Halkans for their refusal to cooperate, then uses an "agonizer" to punish Transporter Chief Kyle for an error.

Kirk orders the landing party to sick bay so that they can assess their predicament in private. He deduces that the ion storm must have opened a barrier between parallel universes, causing the landing parties in each universe to switch places. They decide to impersonate their counterparts until they can find a way home. Uhura ascertains that Starfleet has ordered the Halkans' destruction unless the Empire's demands for dilithium are met. Kirk orders a twelve-hour delay, which Spock reports to Starfleet. Kirk heads for his quarters and is nearly murdered by Chekov and his henchmen, one of whom betrays Chekov and saves Kirk's life.

Kirk's bodyguards arrive and take Chekov to the "Agony Booth" for punishment. When Scott and McCoy join him in his quarters the computer confirms Kirk's hypothesis and provides a procedure to reproduce the transporter accident and return them to their home universe. Kirk also learns that in this universe, his counterpart took command of the ISS Enterprise by assassinating Captain Christopher Pike, and has since committed numerous atrocities. Meanwhile, aboard the USS Enterprise, Spock places their mirror-universe counterparts in confinement, but has not yet determined how to send them home.

On the ISS Enterprise, Scott and McCoy secretly begin work on the engines and transporter. Spock warns Kirk that despite their relationship he cannot support Kirk's aberrant behavior. Kirk defies the warning, releases Chekov from the Agony Booth, and returns to his quarters. There he finds a female officer, Marlena, the "captain's woman"; she assumes his unusual behavior is part of a plot, as their relationship has been cooling of late. Spock interrupts to inform Kirk that he has been ordered to kill him and take command unless Kirk carries out their mission within four hours. Marlena suggests using the Tantalus Field, a weapon concealed in Kirk's quarters. She focuses the device on Mr. Spock, lamenting his imminent demise, but Kirk prevents her from activating it. He reassures her that she is still the captain's woman as he leaves.

In his own quarters, Spock, already suspicious of the landing party, queries the computer about the "classified research" being conducted in Engineering, and decides to confront Kirk again. On the bridge, Uhura distracts Sulu, the security chief as well as the second officer (third-in-command) in this universe, from his security board when it signals Scott's connection of warp power to the transporter. Spock intercepts Kirk in the transporter room and leads him at phaser-point to Sickbay, where Scott, McCoy, and Uhura have been waiting. A fight ensues, in which Spock is knocked out by Kirk. McCoy insists on treating Spock, and before they can leave, Sulu arrives with three security guards. Sulu tells them he intends to assassinate Kirk and make it look like Kirk and Spock killed each other, but Marlena intervenes from Kirk's quarters, using the Tantalus Field to vaporize Sulu's henchmen. Kirk renders Sulu unconscious, and Uhura, Kirk, and Scott head for the transporter room, leaving McCoy to follow after tending to Spock. Spock suddenly awakens and forces McCoy into a Vulcan mind meld to learn why the captain spared his life.

Kirk, Scott, and Uhura reach the transporter room to find Marlena waiting. She asks Kirk to take her with them, but Kirk explains that the transporter is set for four people. Marlena points a phaser at Kirk, but Uhura disarms her. They discover power to the transporter has been cut, and Scott can only reset the controls to allow manual operation, requiring one of them to stay behind. Spock arrives and announces he will operate the controls. Kirk uses the time remaining before the landing party must transport out to argue for the overthrow of the Empire, which Spock agrees is inevitable in 240 years. He urges Spock to take command of the Enterprise and find a way to save the Halkans. When Spock reminds him of the necessity of power, Kirk reveals the existence of the Tantalus Field. As he transports them out, Spock promises to consider what Kirk has said.

Kirk, McCoy, Scott, and Uhura beam out, and find themselves back in the Federation universe. Spock reports he found the ruthless attitude of their counterparts refreshing, sarcastically calling them "the very flower of humanity." Kirk is startled by the appearance of Lieutenant Marlena Moreau from his own universe, recently transferred to the Enterprise, with a report for his signature. In answer to Spock's inquiry, Kirk says only that Moreau "seems like a nice, likable girl" and that perhaps they could become "friends".

== Mirror universe in Star Trek ==
The Star Trek mirror universe concept was revisited in five episodes of Star Trek: Deep Space Nine: "Crossover", "Through the Looking Glass", "Shattered Mirror", "Resurrection" and "The Emperor's New Cloak".

In Star Trek's internal chronology, the earliest appearance of the Mirror Universe is in the prequel series Star Trek: Enterprise. The two-part episode "In a Mirror, Darkly", which is a sequel to the Original Series episode "The Tholian Web", reveals the fate of the USS Defiant.

The Mirror Universe played a large role in the first season of Star Trek: Discovery and was visited in "Despite Yourself", "The Wolf Inside", "Vaulting Ambition", and "What's Past Is Prologue".

The 2014 episode "Fairest of Them All" in the non-canonical fan series Star Trek Continues shows the events in the mirror universe following the original series episode, "Mirror Mirror".

== Reception ==
For the franchise's 30th anniversary in 1996, TV Guide ranked "Mirror, Mirror" No. 3 on its list of the 10 best Star Trek episodes from all series. In 2016, Newsweek ranked "Mirror, Mirror" as one of the best episodes of the original series. In 2016, IGN ranked "Mirror, Mirror" the 3rd best episode of the original series. IO9 ranked "Mirror, Mirror" as the tenth best episode of all Star Trek episodes up to 2011.

In 2012, The A.V. Club ranked this episode as one of their top ten "must see" episodes of the original series.

In 2012, Christian Science Monitor ranked this the fifth best episode of the original Star Trek.

In 2015, New York Public Library suggested this episode as having Spock's fifth best scene in the show.

In a 2016 article highlighting the best episode from each Star Trek series, Digital Trends gave "Mirror, Mirror" an honorable mention. In 2016, Business Insider ranked "Mirror, Mirror" the 6th best episode of the original series. In 2016, IGN ranked "Mirror, Mirror" number 3 in a top ten list of original series episodes.

Empire ranked "Mirror, Mirror" 12th out of the 50 top episodes of all Star Trek in 2016. At that time, there were roughly 726 episodes and a dozen films released.

In 2015, SyFy ranked this episode as one of the top ten essential Star Trek original series Spock episodes.

2016 was the 50th anniversary of the first broadcast of Star Trek, which triggered a large amount of press including TV Guide's review of top original series episodes. They ranked "Mirror, Mirror" the fourth best episode of the series.

In 2016, SyFy noted this episode for actress Nichelle Nichols presentation of Uhura, as having her fourth best scene in Star Trek.

In 2017, SyFy ranked this the best mirror universe episode of Star Trek.

In 2017, Comic Book Resources ranked a character in this episode, Marlena Moreau of the mirror universe, the 8th "fiercest" female character of the Star Trek universe.

In 2017, Vulture listed "Mirror, Mirror" as one of the best episodes of the original show, noting the episode's trip to the darker mirror universe.

In 2018, Collider ranked this episode the 4th best original series episode.

In 2018, PopMatters ranked this the 13th best episode of the original series.

A 2018 Star Trek binge-watching guide by Den of Geek recommended this episode as one of the best of the original series.

In 2019, Comic Book Resources ranked this episode as one of the top 8 most memorable episodes of the original Star Trek.

In 2021, Screen Rant ranked it the best episode of the original Star Trek series to re-watch.

In 2024 Hollywood.com ranked Mirror Mirror at number 3 out of the 79 original series episodes.

== See also ==
- "Fairest of Them All"; a 2014 non-canon, fan-produced, direct continuation of "Mirror, Mirror"
