= Dark Mirror (Duane novel) =

Star Trek novel

- First edition
- Author: Diane Duane
- Cover artist: Keith Birdsong
- Genre: Science fiction
- Publisher: Pocket Books
- Publication date: 1994
- Media type: Print
- Pages: 337
- ISBN: 0-671-79438-8
- OCLC: 28723349

Dark Mirror is a science fiction novel by American writer Diane Duane, part of the Star Trek saga. It is set in the Mirror Universe, and offers an explanation of its more violent culture.

== Plot ==
In Dark Mirror, the Mirror-Spock left the Enterprise and rose through the ranks and spearheaded an effort to reform the Empire. However, the Mirror-Kirk framed him for treason, which resulted in Spock's execution. Soon afterwards Mirror-Sarek was assassinated by another Vulcan seeking his job. As a result, Spock's attempted reforms died with him and the Empire is still alive and powerful. The Klingons are a conquered race, forced into slavery by the Empire after their defeat. The Romulans have also been defeated by the Empire, but committed suicide en masse rather than submit to Terran rule.

Dark Mirror tells how Captain Jean-Luc Picard and the crew of the Enterprise-D are forced to deal with their counterparts. Like the Original Series episode Mirror, Mirror, their counterparts are brutal and savage. For example, the Mirror-Captain Picard had murdered the Mirror-Jack Crusher so as to claim his wife, Beverly Crusher, for himself. Crusher is further forced to build biologically based weaponry. The Mirror-Deanna Troi is a security officer who freely uses torture. The missions of the crew of the Mirror-Enterprise-D's are filled with brutality and even genocidal activities. Personal communicators are intentionally not used in the mirror Starfleet; due to the prevalence of assassinations, they make crewmembers too easy to track down and kill.

When the Enterprise-D crew meet with their alternates, they discover that the Empire is planning to cross into and invade the Federation's universe. The first step of the plan is to capture that universe's Enterprise, kill the crew, and use the vessel as an infiltrator. However, the crew of the Enterprise is able to foil their plans, and find a means to prevent the Empire from invading the Federation.

Captain Picard found that the Mirror Universe Empire had almost reached the limits of what it was presently capable of expanding to. Picard comes to believe they plan to invade the 'main' universe, simply because they have no other choice. He also finds that the seeds of the Mirror Universe's brutality lie in Khan Noonien Singh winning the Eugenics Wars. Toward the book's end, Picard speaks to Mirror-Worf and explains that soon the Empire will be too far spread to maintain control over the worlds it controls that it will collapse, and Worf should inform his people so they can be ready when this day comes.

== Reception ==
Craig Hinton of TV Zone said the previous work of Diane Duane had been "exceptional" but that the book does not live up to expectations. Hinton praises the writing and the characterization but criticize the plot saying it "fails to deliver anything meaty or original."
