= Galactic quadrant =

One of four circular sectors of the Milky Way galaxy

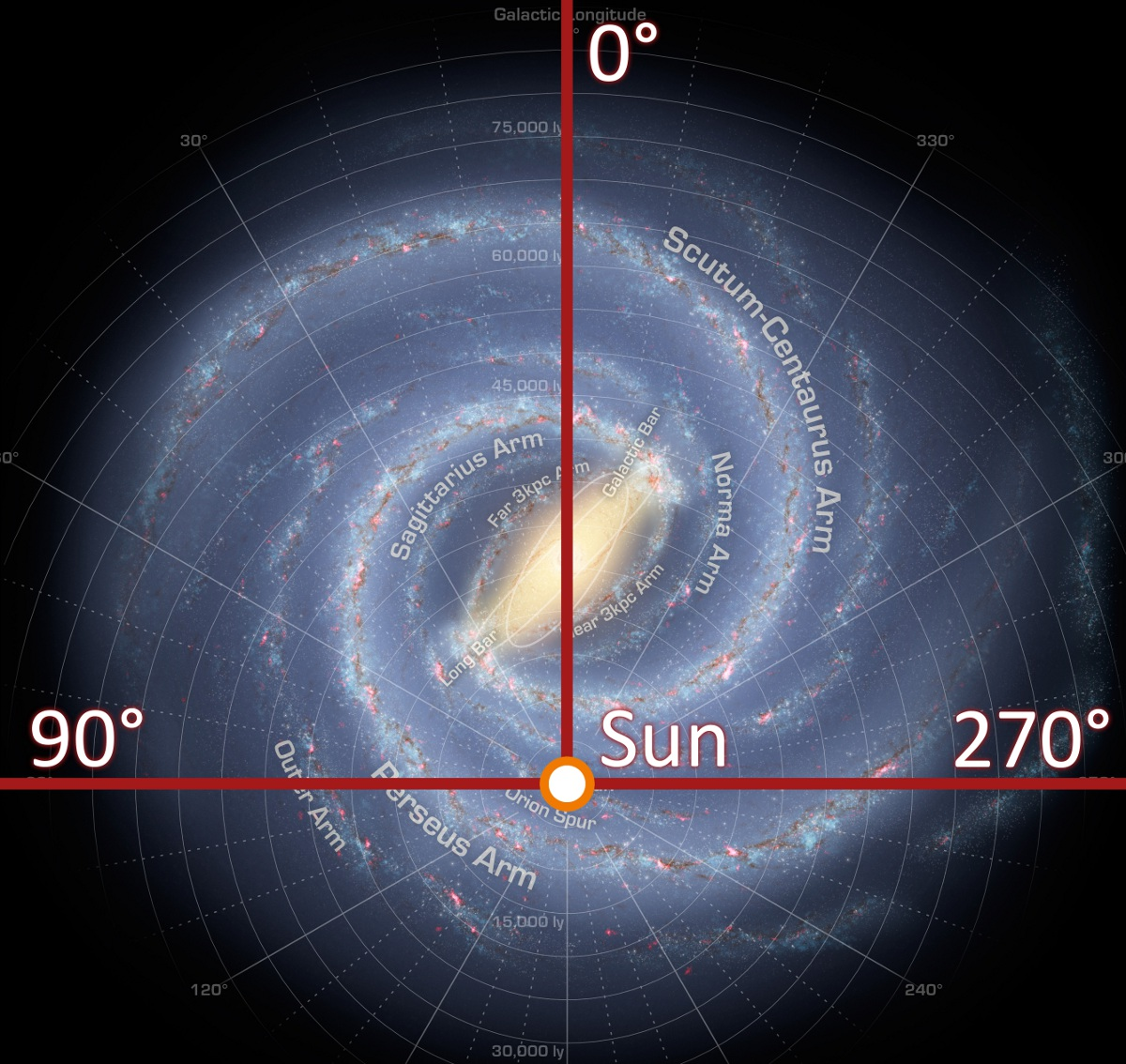
Longitudinal lines of the galactic coordinate system.

In stellar cartography, a galactic quadrant, or quadrant of the Galaxy, is a major region of space encompassing a portion of a galaxy. The Milky Way Galaxy is divided into four circular sectors of such quadrants.

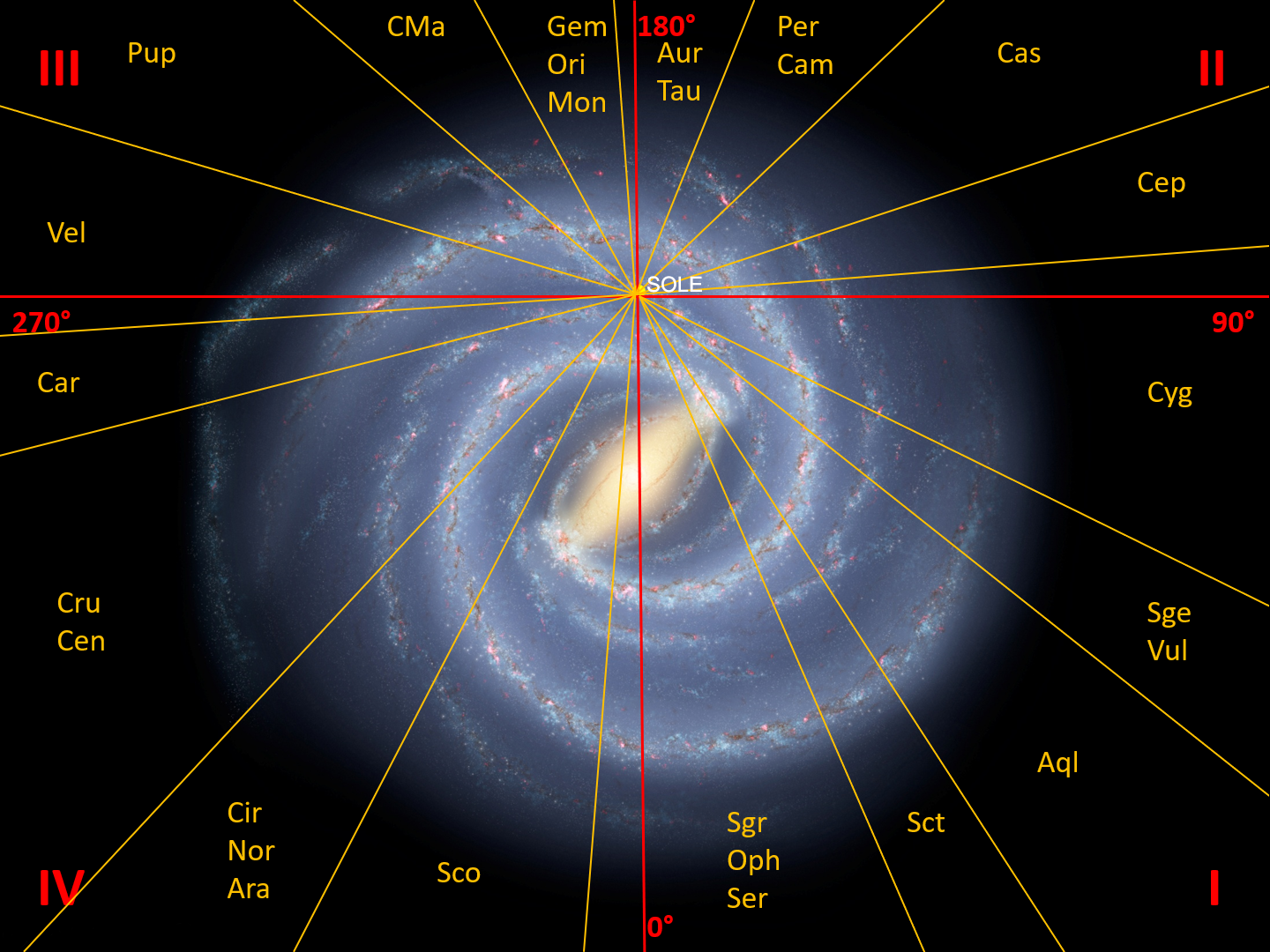
Numbered galactic quadrants and sectors of constellations.

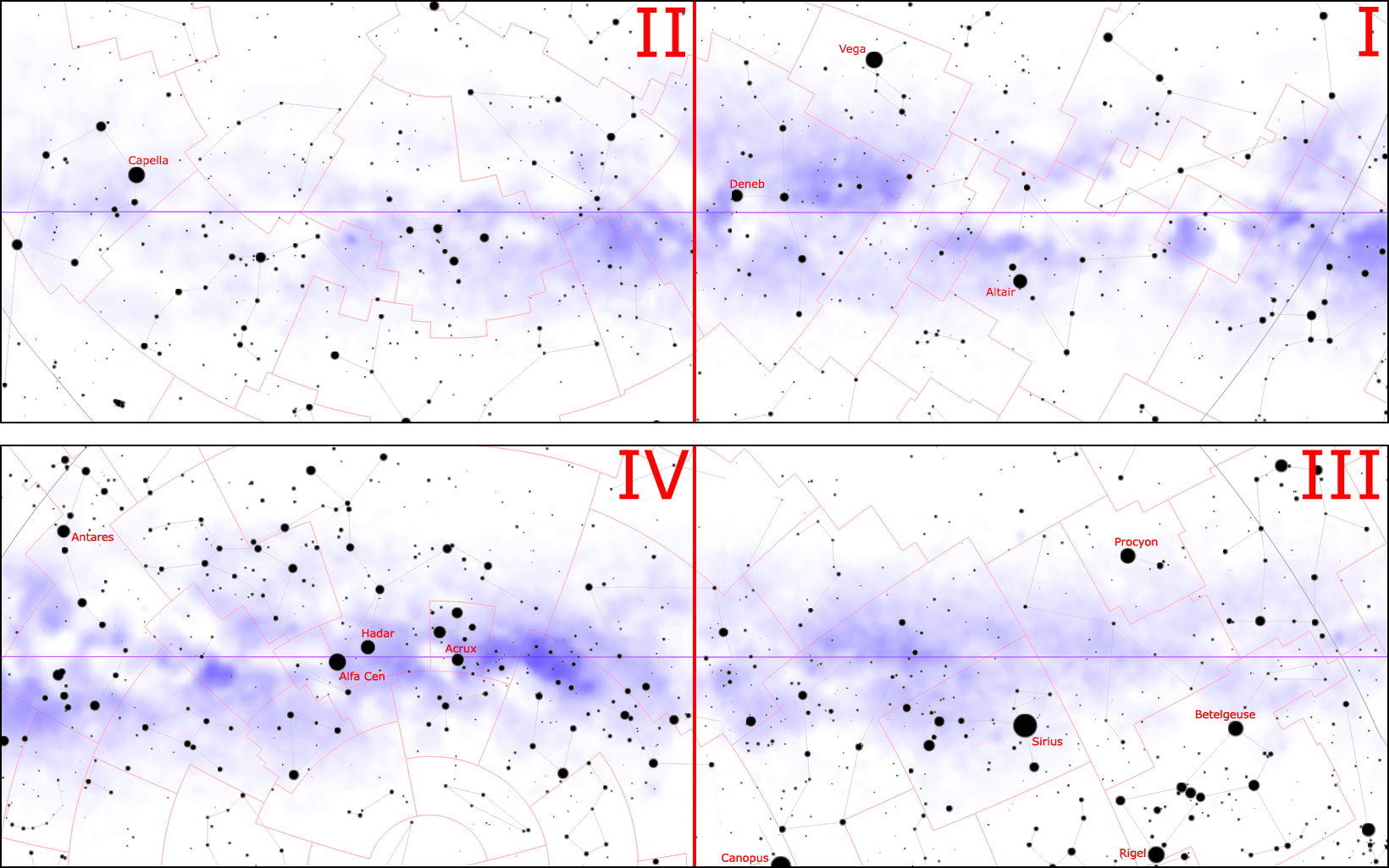
Galactic quadrants as starcharts, with most prominent stars marked.

== Quadrants in the galactic coordinate system ==
In actual astronomical practice, the delineation of the galactic quadrants is based upon the galactic coordinate system, which places the Sun as the pole of the mapping system. The Sun is used instead of the Galactic Center for practical reasons since all astronomical observations (by humans) to date have been based on Earth or within the Solar System.

=== Delineation ===
Quadrants are described using ordinals—for example, "1st galactic quadrant", "second galactic quadrant", or "third quadrant of the Galaxy". Viewing from the north galactic pole with 0 degrees (°) as the ray that runs starting from the Sun and through the galactic center, the quadrants are as follows (where l is galactic longitude):

- 1st galactic quadrant – 0° ≤ l ≤ 90°
- 2nd galactic quadrant – 90° ≤ l ≤ 180°
- 3rd galactic quadrant – 180° ≤ l ≤ 270°
- 4th galactic quadrant – 270° ≤ l ≤ 360°

== Constellations grouped by galactic quadrants ==
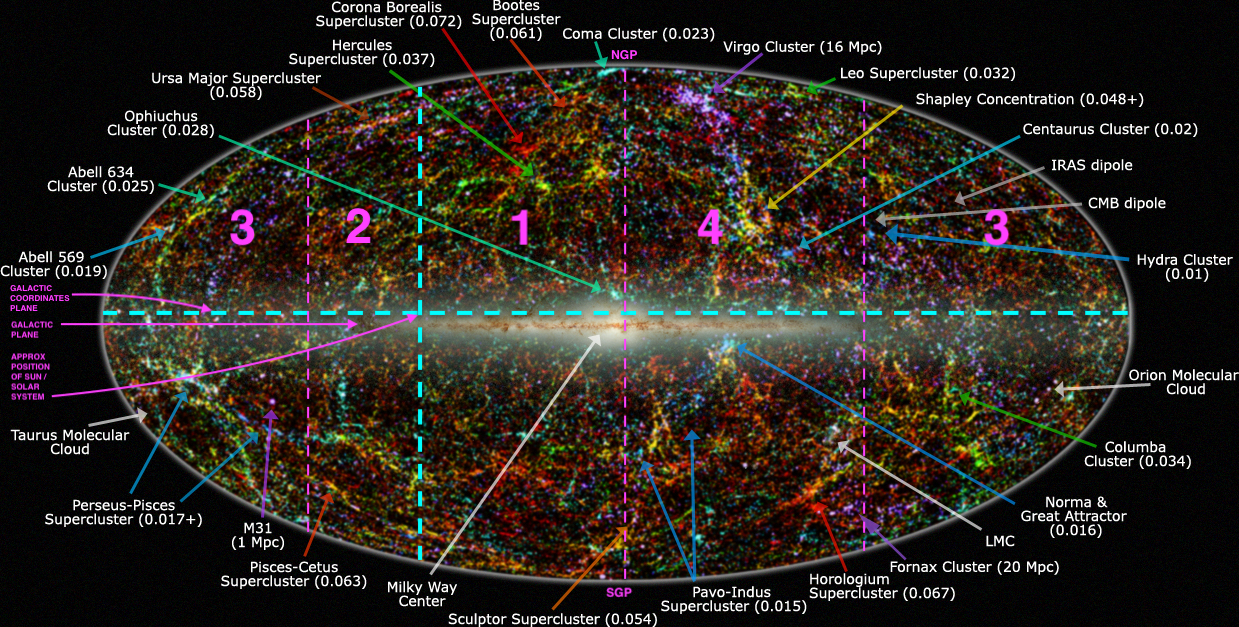
Galactic quadrants (NGQ/SGQ, 1–4) indicated vis-a-vis Galactic poles (NGP/SGP), Galactic Plane (containing galactic centre) and Galactic Coordinates Plane (containing the Sun)

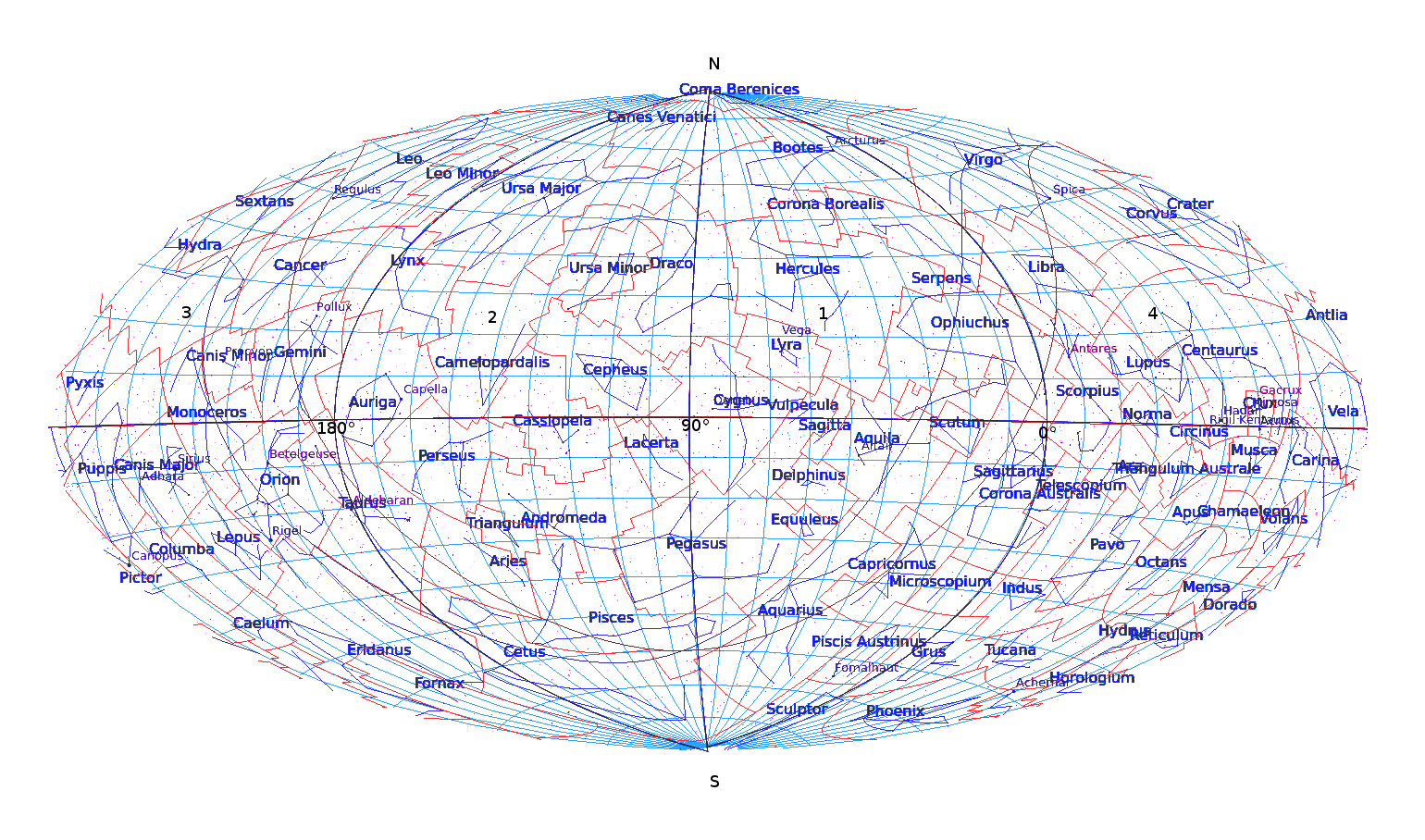
Constellations grouped in galactic quadrants (N/S, 1–4) - this image depicts as a hollow concave face

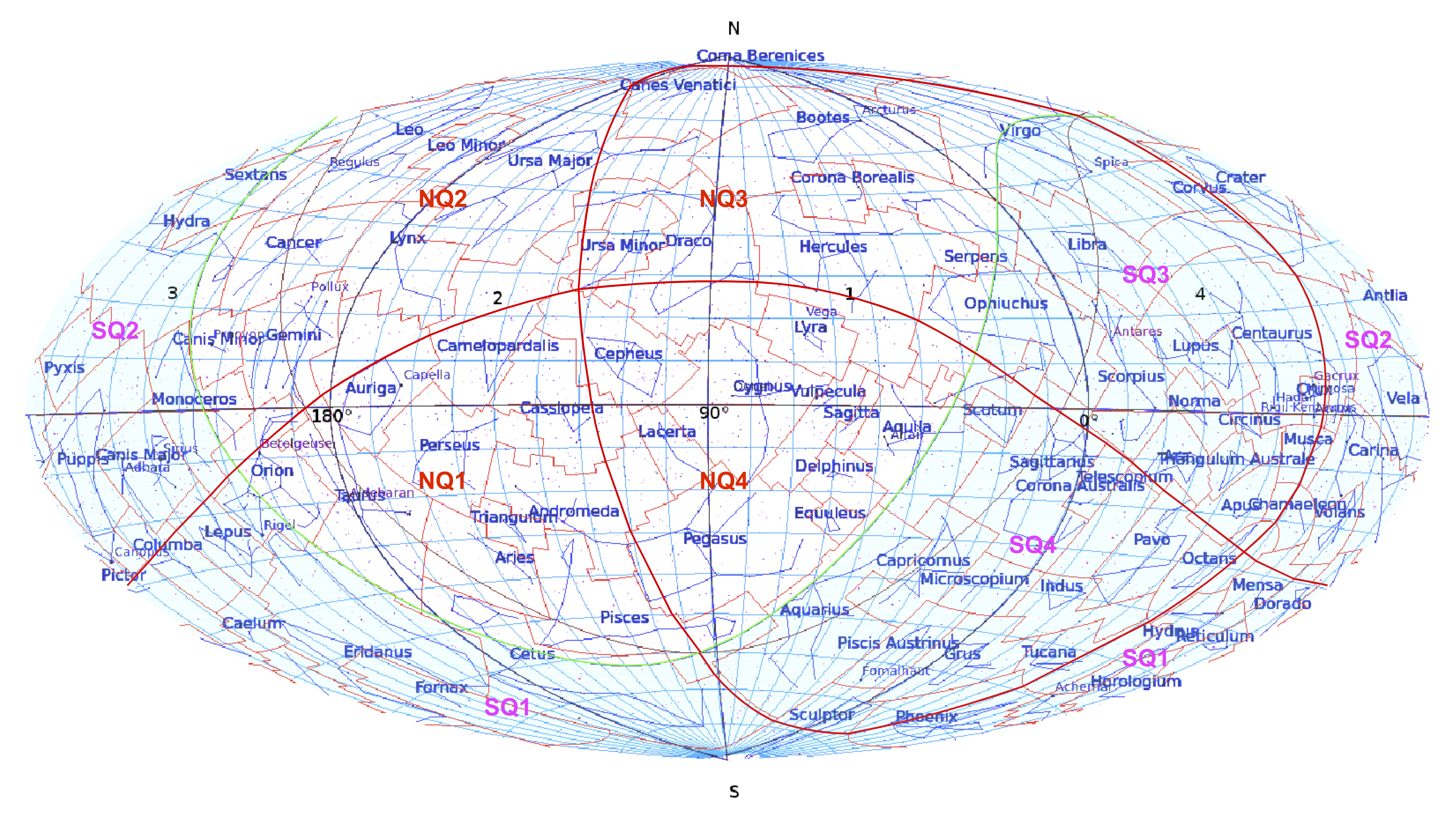
Constellations grouped in galactic quadrants (N/S, 1–4) - their approx divisions vis-a-vis celestial quadrants (NQ/SQ)

Quad	Constellations (Zodiacal constellations in bold)
NGQ1	7 (Lyra, Hercules, Serpens, Corona Borealis, Ophiuchus, Cygnus, Boötes)
SGQ1	11 (**Sagittarius**, **Capricornus**, **Aquarius**, Equuleus, Delphinus, Sagitta, Aquila, Vulpecula, Microscopium, Scutum, Piscis Austrinus)
NGQ2	8 (Cepheus, Draco, Ursa Minor, Canes Venatici, Ursa Major, Lynx, Camelopardalis, Auriga)
SGQ2	10 (**Pisces**, **Aries**, **Taurus**, Andromeda, Cassiopeia, Cetus, Perseus, Triangulum, Lacerta, Pegasus)
NGQ3	9 (**Gemini**, **Cancer**, **Leo**, Canis Minor, Sextans, Hydra, Monoceros, Pyxis, Leo Minor)
SGQ3	9 (Orion, Eridanus, Caelum, Lepus, Pictor, Columba, Canis Major, Puppis, Fornax)
NGQ4	12 (**Virgo**, **Libra**, **Scorpius**, Coma Berenices, Corvus, Crater, Lupus, Centaurus, Norma, Crux, Antlia, Vela)
SGQ4	22 (Circinus, Musca, Telescopium, Triangulum Australe, Apus, Chamaeleon, Corona Australis, Pavo, Indus, Grus, Octans, Sculptor, Phoenix, Reticulum, Dorado, Mensa, Tucana, Volans, Carina, Ara, Hydrus, Horologium)

=== Visibility of each galactic quadrant ===
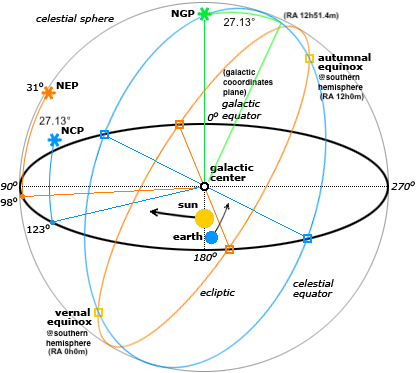
Orientation of the galactic, ecliptic and equatorial coordinate systems, projected on the celestial sphere.

Due to the orientation of the Earth to the rest of the galaxy, the 2nd galactic quadrant is primarily only visible from the Northern Hemisphere while the 4th galactic quadrant is mostly only visible from the Southern Hemisphere. Thus, it is usually more practical for amateur stargazers to use the northern or southern celestial hemisphere quadrants. Nonetheless, cooperating or international astronomical organizations are not so bound by the Earth's horizon.

Based on a view from Earth, one may look towards major constellations for a rough sense of where the borders of the galactic quadrants are: (Note: by drawing a line through the following, one can also approximate the galactic equator.)

- For 0°, look towards the constellation Sagittarius. (The galactic center)
- For 90°, look towards the constellation Cygnus.
- For 180°, look towards the constellation Auriga. (The galactic anticenter)
- For 270°, look towards the constellation Vela.

== Traditional fourfold divisions of the skies (celestial quadrants) ==
A long tradition of dividing the visible skies into four celestial quadrants precedes the modern definitions of four galactic quadrants.

Ancient Mesopotamian formulae spoke of "the four corners of the universe" and of "the heaven's four corners", and the Biblical Book of Jeremiah echoes this phraseology: "And upon Elam will I bring the four winds from the four quarters of heaven" (Jeremiah, 49:36). Astrology too uses quadrant systems to divide up its stars of interest.

The astronomy of the location of constellations uses the Northern and Southern celestial hemisphere divisions into four celestial quadrants each with the entire sky comprising a total of eight regions of equal size and shape - four northern celestial quadrants and four southern celestial quadrants.

Each hemisphere's four quadrants span six of the twenty-four hours of right ascension - hence, the first quadrant runs from 0h00 to 6h00 RA, the second from 6h00 to 12h00 RA, and so on and each quadrant is labelled using NQ or SQ respectively : as an example, "SQ3" would identify Southern Celestial Quadrant 3, the area between 12h00 and 18h00 right ascension in the southern celestial hemisphere.

== In fiction ==
=== Star Trek ===
"Galactic quadrants" within Star Trek are based around a meridian that runs from the center of the Galaxy through Earth's Solar System, which is not unlike the system used by astronomers. However, rather than have the perpendicular axis run through the Sun, as is done in astronomy, the Star Trek version runs the axis through the galactic center. In that sense, the Star Trek quadrant system is less geocentric as a cartographical system than the standard. Also, rather than use ordinals, Star Trek designates them by the Greek letters Alpha, Beta, Gamma, and Delta.

The Canadian Galactic Plane Survey (CGPS) created a radio map of the Galaxy based on Star Trek's quadrants, joking that "the CGPS is primarily concerned with Cardassians, while the SGPS (Southern Galactic Plane Survey) focuses on Romulans".

=== Star Wars ===
"Galactic quadrants" within Star Wars canon astrography map depicts a top-down view of the galactic disk, with "Quadrant A" (i.e. "north") as the side of the galactic center that Coruscant is located on. As the capital planet of the Republic and later the Empire, Coruscant is used as the reference point for galactic astronomy, set at XYZ coordinates 0-0-0. Standardized galactic time measurements are also based on Coruscant's local solar day and year.

=== Warhammer 40,000 ===
The Imperium of Man's territory in the Milky Way Galaxy in Warhammer 40,000 is divided into five zones, known as "segmentae". Navigation in the Milky Way is also identified with cardinal directions, indicating distance from the Sol System: for example, Ultima Segmentum, the largest segmentum in the Imperium of Man, is located to the galactic east of the Sol System. The 0° "north" in Imperial maps does not correspond to the 0° in the real-world.

== See also ==
- Astronomical coordinate systems
- Galactic coordinate system
