= The Tholian Web =

- Star Trek: The Original Series episode
- The Tholians weave an energy web around the Enterprise.
- Episode no.: Season 3 Episode 9
- Directed by: Herb Wallerstein; Ralph Senensky (uncredited)
- Written by: Judy Burns; Chet Richards
- Cinematography by: Al Francis
- Production code: 064
- Original air date: November 15, 1968

Guest appearances
- Sean Morgan – Lt. O'Neil; Barbara Babcock – Voice of Loskene (Tholian commander); Paul Baxley – Defiant Captain; Frank da Vinci – Lt. Brent; Robert Bralver – Crazed Engineer; Jay D. Jones – Dizzy Engineer; Lou Elias – Crazed Crewman; William Blackburn – Lt. Hadley; Roger Holloway – Lt. Lemli

Episode chronology
← Previous "For the World Is Hollow and I Have Touched the Sky"	Next → "Plato's Stepchildren"
- Star Trek: The Original Series season 3

"The Tholian Web" is the ninth episode of the third season of the American science fiction television series Star Trek. Written by Judy Burns and Chet Richards and directed by Herb Wallerstein, it was first broadcast on NBC on November 15, 1968.

In the episode, Captain Kirk is caught between dimensions while the crew of the Enterprise works to retrieve him. All the while, the Tholians are weaving a destructive energy web around the Enterprise.

== Plot ==
The starship USS Enterprise searches for the USS Defiant. Sensors detect fractures in space, and a power loss affects all systems. Defiant is found adrift, and Captain Kirk, First Officer Spock, Chief Medical Officer Dr. McCoy, and Navigator Ensign Chekov transport over wearing environmental suits. Aboard Defiant, they find the crew dead, apparently having killed one another.

The boarding party discovers that Defiant is fading out of our universe. With limited transporter functionality due to the malfunctions, Kirk orders his men to return to Enterprise. As Chief Engineer Scott tries to beam Kirk aboard, Defiant vanishes.

Spock determines that the local space is experiencing periods of "interphase", when two parallel dimensions merge. He believes Kirk will reappear during the next interphase. As he explains the situation, Chekov lashes out in anger, a symptom McCoy believes is due to their proximity to Defiant. Spock refuses to move the ship, fearful of disrupting local space and losing the Captain.

A view of Loskene, one of the Tholian aliens

With two hours until the next interphase, the Enterprise is approached by an unfamiliar ship. Its captain, Commander Loskene of the Tholian Assembly, asserts that Enterprise has violated Tholian space and must leave. Spock persuades Loskene to wait one hour and fifty-three minutes. When the time is up, Kirk does not reappear; Spock concludes that the arrival of the Tholian ship disrupted the interphase.

When the Enterprise is attacked by Loskene, McCoy again urges Spock to leave, believing Kirk lost. Spock returns fire and the Tholian ship is disabled, but the Enterprise takes damage and begins drifting. A second Tholian ship joins the first, and the two begin weaving an energy web that will cage the Enterprise.

Spock and McCoy view a tape left by Kirk, to be played in the event of his death, which implores the two of them to work together. Lieutenant Uhura and Scott both report seeing ghostly manifestations of Kirk. Finally, the apparition is seen on the bridge; Kirk is still in his environmental suit.

With the Tholian web nearly complete, McCoy dispenses an antidote to the effects of the local space, and Spock determines the time of Kirk's next appearance. They lock onto Kirk's coordinates, and Spock orders the activation of the ship's engines, which carries them through the spatial rift. Kirk is brought along by the transporter lock, and beamed aboard just as his oxygen runs out.

On the bridge, Kirk questions Spock and McCoy about their handling of the emergency, particularly concerning the tape. McCoy falsely claims they did not have time to watch it, Spock confirms they were very busy, and Kirk accepts their answers.

== Subsequent appearances ==
The completed Tholian web around the alternate universe ISS Enterprise (NX-01) from Star Trek: Enterprise.

In a two-part episode of Star Trek: Enterprise called "In a Mirror, Darkly", it is revealed that the Defiant has reappeared in the Mirror Universe of Archer's time, where it is first salvaged by the Tholians and then stolen by the Terran Empire.

== Reception ==
In 2015, SyFy ranked this episode as one of the top ten essential Star Trek original series Spock episodes.

In 2016, The Hollywood Reporter rated "The Tholian Web" the 75th best television episode of all Star Trek franchise television shows prior to Star Trek: Discovery.

== Popular culture ==
In 1997 it became known that United States Customs investigators had used the name Tholian Web for a sting operation designed to root out and arrest child porn criminals. By 1997 it had triggered hundreds of prosecutions.

In 2010 Gerry W. Beyer, of the Texas Tech University School of Law, cited a video recording introduced in this episode, which Captain Kirk, Captain of the starship Enterprise, had left for his two most senior officers to play in the event of his death, urging them to overcome their personal animosity. Beyer described this fictional recording as one of the first recorded instances of what he called a video-will.

Political scientists have compared the metaphor of the entrapment in this episode with the deep challenges politicians and administrators feel when confronted with competing factions and lobby groups.

== Home video ==
"The Tholian Web" was released in 1988 on LaserDisc in the United States. It was published by Paramount Home Video, and was released as a pair with "For the World Is Hollow and I Have Touched the Sky". Star Trek titles were popular on the growing home video market in the 1980s, and the Star Trek II film had helped establish the home video market.

This episode was released in Japan on December 21, 1993, as part of the complete season 3 LaserDisc set, Star Trek: Original Series log.3. A trailer for this and the other episodes was also included on an additional disc, and the episode had English and Japanese audio tracks. The cover script was スター・トレック TVサードシーズン for the set.
