= Resurrection (Star Trek: Deep Space Nine) =

- Star Trek: Deep Space Nine episode
- Episode no.: Season 6 Episode 8
- Directed by: LeVar Burton
- Written by: Michael Taylor
- Production code: 532
- Original air date: November 17, 1997

Guest appearances
- John Towey as Vedek; Philip Anglim as Bareil Antos

Episode chronology
| ← Previous "You Are Cordially Invited" | Next → "Statistical Probabilities" |
- Star Trek: Deep Space Nine season 6

"Resurrection" is the eighth episode of the sixth season of the science-fiction television series Star Trek: Deep Space Nine, the 132nd episode overall. It aired on November 17, 1997. Major Kira must come to terms with her feelings when a man arrives on the Station that bears an uncanny resemblance to someone from her past.

This episode was directed by LeVar Burton and written by Michael Taylor.

The episode premiered to Nielsen ratings of 5.1 points.

== Plot ==
The Mirror Universe version of Vedek Bareil arrives on DS9 in the Operations transporter, taking Major Kira Nerys hostage in exchange for a ship he can use to flee the station. Captain Sisko allows them to go, but signals Odo in the guise of an authorization code. Bareil and Kira arrive at the landing pad, but fight when Kira notices his weapon is non-functional; Bareil is knocked unconscious, and arrested when Odo and a security team arrive.

While in the holding cell, Bareil convinces Kira that he means no harm, and is merely fleeing the tyrannical Alliance. He begs her to destroy his transporting device so he cannot be taken back to his own universe. Kira tells Sisko that she does not want to press charges. Sisko releases Bareil, but warns Kira to remember that this man is not the same Bareil she once knew.

Mirror Universe Bareil attends a Bajoran religious ceremony with Kira, who has agreed to help him adjust to life in the Prime Universe. Kira then invites Bareil to dinner with Commanders Worf and Jadzia Dax; afterwards, the couple goes to Kira's quarters, where Bareil claims his partner is dead, and they spend the night together.

The following day, Kira takes Bareil to the Bajoran temple to have an experience with the Orb of Prophecy at his request. When Bareil returns to his quarters alone, the Intendant (Kira's Mirror Universe counterpart) appears from where she has been hiding, revealing they both are involved in an elaborate plot to steal the Orb of Prophecy; this would help them rule their own people in the Mirror Universe and forcibly overthrow the Alliance.

After a suspicious interaction with Bareil, Quark warns Major Kira that Bareil likely intends to rob the Temple. Going there, she catches him unlocking the safe where the Orb is housed. Kira is ambushed by the Intendent, who holds her at gunpoint, gloating that Bareil never cared for Kira and was only using her these last two days. Bareil turns on and stuns the Intendent, having had a change of heart after seeing a possible future of a life with Kira in the Orb of Prophecy. However, he knows that this cannot be, as he is an inveterate thief and liar who would somehow foul things up. He transports himself and the unconscious Intendent back to their own universe, leaving Kira and the Orb behind.

== Reception ==
The episode premiered to Nielsen ratings of 5.1 points.

In 2018, CBR included this episode in a list of Star Trek episodes that are "so bad they must be seen". They note this as one of Star Trek's mirror universe themed episodes.

In 2017, SyFy ranked this as the worst mirror universe episode of Star Trek, but did praise some of the character interactions.

In 2019, Screen Rant ranked this episode one of the ten worst episodes of Star Trek: Deep Space Nine. They note that at that time it had a rating of 5.9/10, based on user rankings on the site IMDB.

== See also ==
- Mirror, Mirror (Star Trek: The Original Series) (Star Trek, October 6, 1967); this is the first Star Trek mirror universe episode
