= Image G =

American visual effects company specializing in motion control

Image G, Inc.
- Type: Private
- Industry: Visual effects, motion control photography
- Founded: 1984
- Founder: Thomas Major Barron
- Headquarters: Valencia, California, United States
- Key people: Thomas Major Barron (founder), Walter Hart (CEO)
- Website: imageg.com

Image G, Inc., also credited as Image "G" and IMAGE, is an American visual effects company specializing in motion control photography. It was founded in 1984 by Thomas Major Barron, a former engineer at Robert Abel and Associates. The company built and operated large camera motion-control cranes, most notably the Bulldog, and supplied motion control photography to the Star Trek television franchise from The Next Generation through Deep Space Nine and Voyager. Image G received a Technical Achievement Award from the Academy of Motion Picture Arts and Sciences for the design of the Bulldog crane in 2002.

== History ==
=== Founding ===
Barron founded Image G in 1984 to serve his own projects in visual effects. He had previously worked at Robert Abel and Associates, where, according to the company, he developed early computer-controlled camera systems used on several of Abel's Clio-winning commercials. The company's motion control equipment was used on film and television productions including The Addams Family, Stargate, Waterworld, and the television series Lois & Clark: The New Adventures of Superman.

=== Star Trek ===
Image G's association with the Star Trek franchise began after the production of the pilot "Encounter at Farpoint", when Robert Legato, a former Image G employee who had become visual effects supervisor for Star Trek: The Next Generation, brought a studio model to the company and asked it to shoot footage for him. The company subsequently became the regular supplier of motion control photography for the franchise, working on The Next Generation, Deep Space Nine, Voyager, and the feature film Star Trek Generations.

Barron said the company also acted as an informal repository for the franchise's physical studio models, at one point storing them on a folding table at its unsecured Hollywood facility while awaiting a formal arrangement with Paramount Television. Visual effects supervisor Dan Curry, in a 2017 interview, described the Image G motion-control stage as the site of much of the franchise's practical-model effects work, and said the physical limitations of the rigs—track length, tower height, and boom reach—gave the spacecraft shots a realism that unrestricted computer-generated camera moves lacked. VFX Voice likewise reported that The Next Generation's ships were "physical miniatures filmed on Image G's motion-control stage in Hollywood."

The company earned three Emmy Awards for its effects work on Star Trek: The Next Generation and Star Trek: Deep Space Nine.

As the Star Trek productions shifted to computer-generated imagery (CGI) in the late 1990s, demand for physical-model motion control photography declined.

=== Later years ===
The company later incorporated computer techniques into its motion control work, combining Kuper Controls with Maya CGI software to produce repeatable camera moves from stop motion to high-speed live action, and distributing rig specifications and camera paths as kinematic Maya models and PDF documentation. It remains in operation, located in Valencia, California.

== Bulldog ==
The Bulldog is a trailer-mounted motion-control camera crane that Image G first built in 1988 and has continuously upgraded. According to the company, the original sat on 64 feet (20 m) of track with a 20-foot (6.1 m) boom, moved by stepper motors originally designed for industrial robots. Later configurations, Image G states, support boom arm lengths up to 32 feet (9.8 m), pivot heights up to 14 feet (4.3 m), and track extendable in 16-foot (4.9 m) sections to over 100 feet (30 m).

At the 74th Scientific and Technical Awards in 2002, the Academy presented the Bulldog with a Technical Achievement Award (Academy Certificate) to "Thomas Major Barron for the overall concept and design; Charles Smith for the structural engineering; and Gordon Seitz for the mechanical engineering of the Bulldog Motion Control Camera Crane," citing its "unprecedented combination of long reach, high-speed and a novel approach to its transport." The award was reported by Variety.

The crane has been used to combine live-action, miniature, and computer-generated elements by running matched, scaled moves. For one commercial featuring Lady Gaga, Image G operated two Bulldogs on separate stages—a 32-foot (9.8 m) boom arm on one photographing small-scale figures while a nodalized lens on the other filmed the performer at full size—and combined the elements in post-production. According to the company, the Bulldog was also used with a still camera for the Nissan Altima corporate website, photographing frames at 72 positions to produce a QuickTime VR panorama.

Image G also operates a second named rig, the Hyena, which was used alongside the Bulldog for location filming of commercials for Ford in the Middle East.

== Awards ==
Year	Award	Category / recipient	Result
Academy of Motion Picture Arts and Sciences
2002	Technical Achievement Award (Academy Certificate)	Bulldog Motion Control Camera Crane — concept and design by Thomas Major Barron; structural engineering by Charles Smith; mechanical engineering by Gordon Seitz| style="background: #9EFF9E; color: #000; vertical-align: middle; text-align: center; " class="yes table-yes2 notheme"|Won	
Primetime Emmy Awards
—	Emmy Award	Visual effects (three awards) for Star Trek: The Next Generation and Star Trek: Deep Space Nine| style="background: #9EFF9E; color: #000; vertical-align: middle; text-align: center; " class="yes table-yes2 notheme"|Won	
Clio Awards
—	Clio Award	style="background: #9EFF9E; color: #000; vertical-align: middle; text-align: center; " class="yes table-yes2 notheme"|Won	
—	Clio Award	style="background: #9EFF9E; color: #000; vertical-align: middle; text-align: center; " class="yes table-yes2 notheme"|Won	

== Selected credits ==
- Star Trek: The Next Generation
- Star Trek: Deep Space Nine
- Star Trek: Voyager
- Star Trek Generations
- The Addams Family
- Stargate
- Waterworld
- Lois & Clark: The New Adventures of Superman
- Commercials for Pepsi, Nissan, and Ford

== See also ==
- Motion control photography
- Robert Abel and Associates
- Robert Legato
