= Mirror Universe =

Fictional universe within the Star Trek multiverse

The Mirror Universe is the setting of several narratives in the Star Trek science fiction franchise, a parallel universe existing alongside, but separate from, the fictional universe that is the main setting of Star Trek. It resembles the main Star Trek universe, but is populated by more violent and opportunistic doubles of its people. The Mirror Universe has been visited in one episode of Star Trek: The Original Series, five episodes of Star Trek: Deep Space Nine, a two-part episode of Star Trek: Enterprise, a storyline woven through the first season of Star Trek: Discovery (continuing with a Mirror Universe character in the main cast of seasons 2 and 3), and several non-canon Star Trek tie-in works. It is named after "Mirror, Mirror", the Original Series episode in which it first appeared.

== Characteristics ==
The characters in the Mirror Universe are aggressive, mistrustful and opportunistic in personality. Whereas the Star Trek universe depicts an optimistic future in which the Earth-based democratic United Federation of Planets values peace, co-operation and exploration, episodes set in the Mirror Universe feature the human-dominated totalitarian Terran Empire which values war, despotism and conquest instead. Humans in the Mirror Universe are typically referred to as "Terrans".

In Star Trek: Discovery, it is stated that humans from the Mirror Universe suffer from photophobia (a sensitivity to light).

== Television appearances ==
=== The Original Series ===
The Mirror Universe was first introduced in the original Star Trek episode "Mirror, Mirror", which featured a brutal Empire, managed by humans and their Vulcan allies, in place of the United Federation of Planets. The Mirror Captain Kirk of the ISS Enterprise was a mass murderer who was promoted to Captain after assassinating Captain Christopher Pike. Discipline aboard starships was enforced through agony booths and agonizers carried by crewmembers. Officers were barbaric in behavior and advanced in rank by killing superiors who they thought were incompetent. Nazi-style salutes were used by crewmembers to show loyalty to their captain. Spock's double wore a goatee, which became a popular culture trope as a visual marker for an evil version of a character.

==== Episodes ====
Series	#	Title	Overview
TOS	204	"Mirror, Mirror"	Four crewmembers from the USS Enterprise switch places with their Mirror Universe counterparts and must get home while avoiding being discovered by the Mirror Universe crew of the Enterprise.
TOS	309	"The Tholian Web"	The USS Defiant (NCC-1764) is trapped in Interphase in Tholian space and vanishes. No elements from the Mirror Universe are shown or mentioned in this episode, but its connection with the Mirror Universe was established retroactively by the Star Trek: Enterprise episode "In a Mirror, Darkly".

=== Deep Space Nine ===
The Mirror Universe was later revisited in the Deep Space Nine second-season episode "Crossover"; it was turned into a story arc that spanned into the final season, with five Mirror Universe episodes over the course of five seasons. The series reveals that when exposed to individuals from the normal universe, the Terran Empire began to reform itself for the better, but was overthrown in the 23rd century by an alliance of alien species who took advantage of the Empire's self-weakening and conquered it, enslaving humans and Vulcans in the process.

==== Episodes ====
Series	#	Title	Overview
DS9	223	"Crossover"	Dr. Bashir and Major Kira are transported to the Mirror Universe 100 years after the events of "Mirror, Mirror". They find that the Terran Empire has fallen and been replaced by an Alliance of Klingons, Cardassians and Bajorans and that humans are slaves.
DS9	319	"Through the Looking Glass"	The Mirror O'Brien kidnaps Captain Sisko (whose Mirror counterpart is dead), and Sisko must impersonate his late counterpart in order to save the Mirror version of his late wife.
DS9	420	"Shattered Mirror"	After the Mirror Jennifer Sisko kidnaps Jake, Captain Sisko must travel to the Mirror Universe to retrieve his son. While there, the Mirror O'Brien wishes for Sisko to help him prepare their version of the Defiant for battle against the Alliance in what could mean freedom for the humans.
DS9	608	"Resurrection"	The Mirror version of Vedek Bareil arrives on DS9 as he flees from the Alliance. His real reason for being in their universe is to steal the Bajoran Orb of Prophecy and Change for the Intendant, the Mirror Kira. However, before he can complete this mission, he has a change of conscience, convinced by Kira, leaving the Orb behind and returning to the Mirror Universe with the Intendant.
DS9	712	"The Emperor's New Cloak"	Grand Nagus Zek, financial leader of the Ferengi Alliance, travels to the Mirror Universe to seek out more financial opportunities for the Ferengi Alliance and is captured by Regent Worf and the Intendant Kira. Quark and Rom must pay a ransom of a cloaking device to free Zek, but Regent Worf imprisons them all in his quest to crush the rebels. They ultimately escape with the help of Mirror Ezri, and the Terrans and their alien allies capture Regent Worf, all but securing victory for their rebellion.

=== Enterprise ===
A two-part episode of Star Trek: Enterprise, entitled "In a Mirror, Darkly", introduces the early developments of the Mirror Universe. This is the first episode which takes place entirely in the Mirror Universe, and in which no Prime Universe characters appear.

==== Episodes ====
Series	#	Title	Overview
ENT	418	"In a Mirror, Darkly"	The crew of the ISS Enterprise (NX-01) discover that the USS Defiant, a ship from 100 years in the future of an alternative universe and last seen in the original series episode "The Tholian Web", has travelled to their universe through a rip in space. The Enterprise is destroyed, but its surviving crew uses the improved technology of the Defiant to chase away their attackers.
ENT	419	"In a Mirror, Darkly Part II"	The Mirror Enterprise crew find the Defiant littered with the corpses of its former crew who murdered each other due to the effects of "interphase". Mirror Archer plots to use the Defiant to take control of the Terran Empire. However, it is the Mirror Hoshi Sato who ultimately threatens to use the Defiant's weapons on the Emperor of the Terran Empire and replace him as Empress.

=== Discovery ===
The first season of Star Trek: Discovery has a storyline involving the Mirror Universe. Captain Gabriel Lorca, commander of the USS Discovery, is discovered to be an inhabitant of the Mirror Universe on account of his intolerance to bright light, a genetic trait common to all humans from the Mirror Universe.

In 2018, Comic Book Resources rated Discovery's Mirror Universe saga as the 18th best multi-part episode story of Star Trek.

==== Episodes ====
Series	#	Title	Overview
DSC	109	"Into the Forest I Go"	In the final scene of the episode the USS Discovery finds itself in the Mirror Universe following an apparent malfunction of its experimental spore drive.
DSC	110	"Despite Yourself"	The crew disguise their ship as its Mirror Universe counterpart, the ISS Discovery. They also discover records of the USS Defiant and hope to use that information to find a way back home. They are approached by the ISS Shenzhou - the Mirror Universe version of Michael Burnham's old ship - which Burnham goes aboard in an effort to obtain more information about the USS Defiant.
DSC	111	"The Wolf Inside"	In the guise of her Mirror self, Burnham meets the Mirror versions of Voq and Sarek, who are resistance leaders. The ISS Shenzhou is met by the Terran Emperor, who is revealed to be the Mirror version of Burnham's deceased mentor and former captain, Philippa Georgiou.
DSC	112	"Vaulting Ambition"	Burnham brings Captain Gabriel Lorca (both in the apparent guise of their Mirror counterparts) to Mirror Georgiou on board the ISS Charon, the Terran flagship. Burnham notices Emperor Georgiou squinting in bright light. It is revealed that humans in the Mirror Universe are more averse to bright light than their Prime Universe counterparts. Burnham realises that "Lorca" is in fact from the Mirror Universe, and that he has been manipulating her and the rest of the Discovery crew all along.
DSC	113	"What's Past Is Prologue"	Lorca and Georgiou battle for control of the Charon and the Terran Empire. Lorca is killed and Emperor Georgiou escapes to the Discovery with Burnham.
DSC	114	"The War Without, The War Within"	Discovery makes it back to the Prime Universe, but overshoots the point in time when they left by nine months, during which the Federation has nearly completely been overwhelmed by Klingons. A Starfleet admiral authorizes Emperor Georgiou's proposal to use volcanic tunnels to destroy the Klingon homeworld. Passed off as the Prime Universe's own Captain Georgiou miraculously found alive, the Emperor takes command of Discovery.
DSC	115	"Will You Take My Hand?"	Burnham prevents Emperor Georgiou from carrying out her plans and peace is made with the Klingons. In a bonus scene revealed at a convention after the episode's broadcast, Emperor Georgiou is shown being recruited into Section 31.
DSC	309	"Terra Firma, Part 1"	Seeking a cure to an illness caused by her temporal and dimensional displacement, Georgiou encounters a being named Carl who directs Georgiou to a door. On the other side, she finds herself back in the Mirror Universe during her reign as Emperor of the Terran Empire. Georgiou finds that her time with Discovery has changed her, and she uses her knowledge of the past to alter certain events.
DSC	310	"Terra Firma Part 2"	Georgiou hopes to lead an improved Terran Empire with Burnham by her side, with them working together to hunt Burnham's former lover Gabriel Lorca, but this is a ruse and Burnham soon turns on Georgiou. After a fight, Georgiou kills Burnham before dying herself in Saru's arms. She returns to Dannus V, where Carl reveals himself to be the Guardian of Forever. He says that he had to test her first and was happy to see her attempt to change the fate of the Terran Empire, creating an alternate timeline of the Mirror Universe. Georgiou says goodbye to Burnham before traveling through the Guardian's portal. He sends Georgiou to another time and place where she will survive.
DSC	505	"Mirrors"	The ISS Enterprise is found trapped in a wormhole in the 32nd century by the crew of the Discovery. According to a plaque on the ship, the Terran High Chancellor was killed after his reforms failed and the Enterprise crew mutinied and fled to the prime universe with refugees looking for a new life. The crew subsequently abandoned ship after it became trapped in the wormhole. Burnham and Cleveland Booker find the next clue on their treasure hunt on the ship and pull the Enterprise out of the wormhole with Discovery's help. Burnham subsequently has the ISS Enterprise sent to Federation Headquarters for storage and reveals to Booker that according to Federation databases, most of the crew survived and found new lives in the prime universe. The Enterprise's junior science officer Dr. Carmen Cho joined Starfleet and rose to the rank of branch Admiral, becoming the person to leave the clue on board the long-abandoned ship.

=== Prodigy ===
In the second season of Star Trek: Prodigy, the crew of the USS Protostar wind up in the mirror universe after an interphasic rift splits the USS Voyager-A into a number of alternate realities.

Series	#	Title	Overview
PRO	214	"Cracked Mirror"	In 2384, the USS Protostar accidentally creates an interphasic rift, splitting the USS Voyager-A into a number of alternate realities. The bridge level is located on the ISS Voyager-A in the mirror universe which is commanded by the counterpart of Vice Admiral Kathryn Janeway with Chakotay as her first officer. By this point, the Terran Rebellion has succeeded in overthrowing the Klingons and the Cardassians and creating an independent Terran state. With the Loom invading the mirror universe as well, Janeway reluctantly allows the Protostar's crew to use the deflector dish on her ship to seal the anomaly, restoring everything to normal.

== Appearances in other media ==
In addition to the television episodes, a number of ancillary tie-in works make use of the Mirror Universe setting. These works may contradict continuity as established in the television episodes, and are not considered canon.

=== Novels ===
==== Star Trek: Stargazer ====
The Star Trek: Stargazer novel Three by Michael Jan Friedman features the Mirror Universe.

==== Dark Mirror ====
The Star Trek: The Next Generation book Dark Mirror, written by Diane Duane, offers another explanation of what happened after Captain Kirk and three of his crew encountered the Mirror Universe. In the novel, the Empire is still in existence in the 24th century. The point of divergence initially appears to be the Eugenics Wars where the genetic supermen were not defeated and eventually turned on each other resulting in atomic war, but works dating back to the days of ancient Greece supporting the Empire's current mindset are noted.

==== Shatnerverse ====
Various novels have been set in the Deep Space Nine version of the Mirror Universe, including a trilogy by William Shatner, which reveals the Mirror Kirk (or "Emperor Tiberius" as he calls himself) is still alive and plotting to reconquer the Empire.

==== Star Trek: Mirror Universe ====
Two collections of Mirror Universe stories were published in 2007: the first, Glass Empires, involves Mirror Enterprise, TOS and TNG and the second, Obsidian Alliances, features Mirror DS9, Voyager and New Frontier. The Sorrows of Empire, a novel-length expansion of David Mack's story of the same name in Glass Empires, was published in 2009.

A third collection, Shards and Shadows, was released in January 2009. The Mirror Universe storyline was concluded in the novel Rise Like Lions, released in November 2011. A further story taking place in the Mirror Universe, Section 31 - Disavowed, was released in October 2014.

=== Games ===
A number of Star Trek games take place in the Mirror Universe or reference it. Among them, the first-person shooter Star Trek: Voyager – Elite Force, the massively multiplayer online game Star Trek Online, the battle simulator Star Trek: Shattered Universe which is entirely set in the Mirror Universe, Decipher's Star Trek Roleplaying Game and Star Trek: Attack Wing.

=== Comics ===
The concept of a morally inverted universe had been pioneered by DC Comics in 1964, three years before Star Trek adopted the idea, in the Justice League of America story "Crisis on Earth-Three" written by Gardner Fox. The Mirror Universe Saga is a trade paperback that reprints eight issues of DC Comics' Star Trek comic book (issues #9-16) chronicling an encounter between the Mirror Universe and the Prime Universe. It is set immediately after the events of Star Trek III: The Search for Spock. The series was written by Mike W. Barr and drawn by Tom Sutton & Ricardo Villagrán. This version postulates the divergence of history to start at the time of the Earth-Romulan War, with the conquest of Earth by the Romulans; after Earth's liberation, the resistance became an empire-building government.

From 2017 to 2018, IDW Publishing published three limited series set in the Mirror Universe: Mirror Broken (2017), Through the Mirror (2018), and Terra Incognita (2018). These series focused on Jean-Luc Picard and the crew of the ISS Enterprise. A new limited series, entitled Mirror War, was first published in 2021. It follows Picard's ongoing galactic conquest which draws the attention of the Klingon-Cardassian Alliance.

=== Web series ===
The fan-produced web series Star Trek Continues included an episode set in the Mirror Universe called "Fairest of Them All".
