= Bob Trendler =

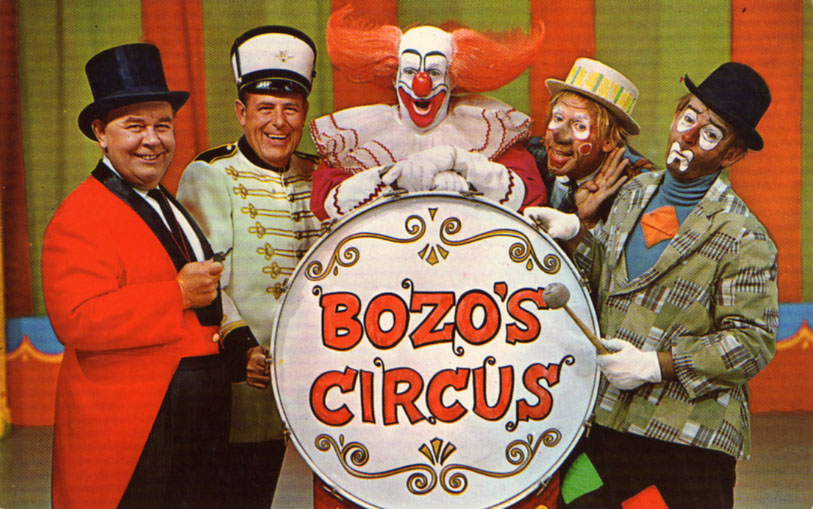
The cast of Bozo's Circus in 1967. From left: Ned Locke, Bob Trendler, Bob Bell, Ray Rayner and Don Sandburg

Robert Trendler (May 11, 1912 – July 18, 2011) was an American bandleader, songwriter, and musical director of the WGN Orchestra from 1956 till 1975. Trendler was known in Chicago as Mr. Bob the bandleader of Bozo's Big Top Band, on Bozo's Circus, a television program for children home from school for lunch.

Robert Trendler Sr. was born in Cincinnati, Ohio on May 11, 1912, the only child of John & Kathryn Trendler, both European immigrants. Trendler's early life was centered on music and broadcasting. He began playing the piano at age 6, and spent many childhood hours in radio stations, as his mother was the music director of Cincinnati's WLW. When his mother, an opera soprano, toured Europe, the young boy was accomplished enough to accompany her on the piano. At age 21, Trendler went to work for the station as an accompanist and music arranger. Trendler's music arranging took him to New York City, where he worked with George Gershwin, Cab Calloway and Duke Ellington. Working with people like Eddie Duchin taught him about jazz. A job playing the piano at the Century of Progress exposition brought him to Chicago; a short time after arriving in the city, Trendler went to work for WGN Radio.

By 1941, Trendler had become the director of the WGN Dance Band and was also the WGN Choral Director. Trendler also did occasional work with the Chicago Symphony Orchestra; he was named director of the WGN Orchestra in 1956. While Trendler worked on seven WGN radio programs at one time, he became well-known to many in the Chicago area when, as "Mr. Bob", he led a 13-piece band on the weekday Bozo's Circus children's television program at WGN-TV. He was remembered as a willing participant in the show's jokes and clowning skits; Trendler never minded a pie in the face any more than those doing the clowning.

He met his wife, Annette, at Chicago's La Salle Hotel; she was a member of a vocal trio, The Three Graces. The group was performing with Rudy Vallée at the time. Trendler and his wife raised their two sons in Lake Forest, Illinois in a home surrounded by flowers and Trendler's 1.5 acre vegetable garden. His interests away from the job included photography, a large model railroad outfit and cycling. He gave up his speedboat racing hobby after his sons were born. Trendler retired from WGN in 1975; upon Trendler's retirement, the 13-piece band he had led was reduced to a band with only three members. He and his wife Annette retired to Florida. Upon relocating to Florida, Trendler was an active member of the Sarasota Broadcasting Club. In 2010, Trendler had a perfect attendance record for the club's meetings.

Robert Trendler died of natural causes on July 18, 2011 in Ellenton, Florida at the age of 99. His wife Annette died in 2002.

== Songs ==
- "Kiss Me", a song recorded by Lisa Kirk, written by Trendler and Redd Evans 1949, covered by Claire Hogan 1959, Billie Laine 1961
