= Frazier Thomas =

American television personality (1918–1985)

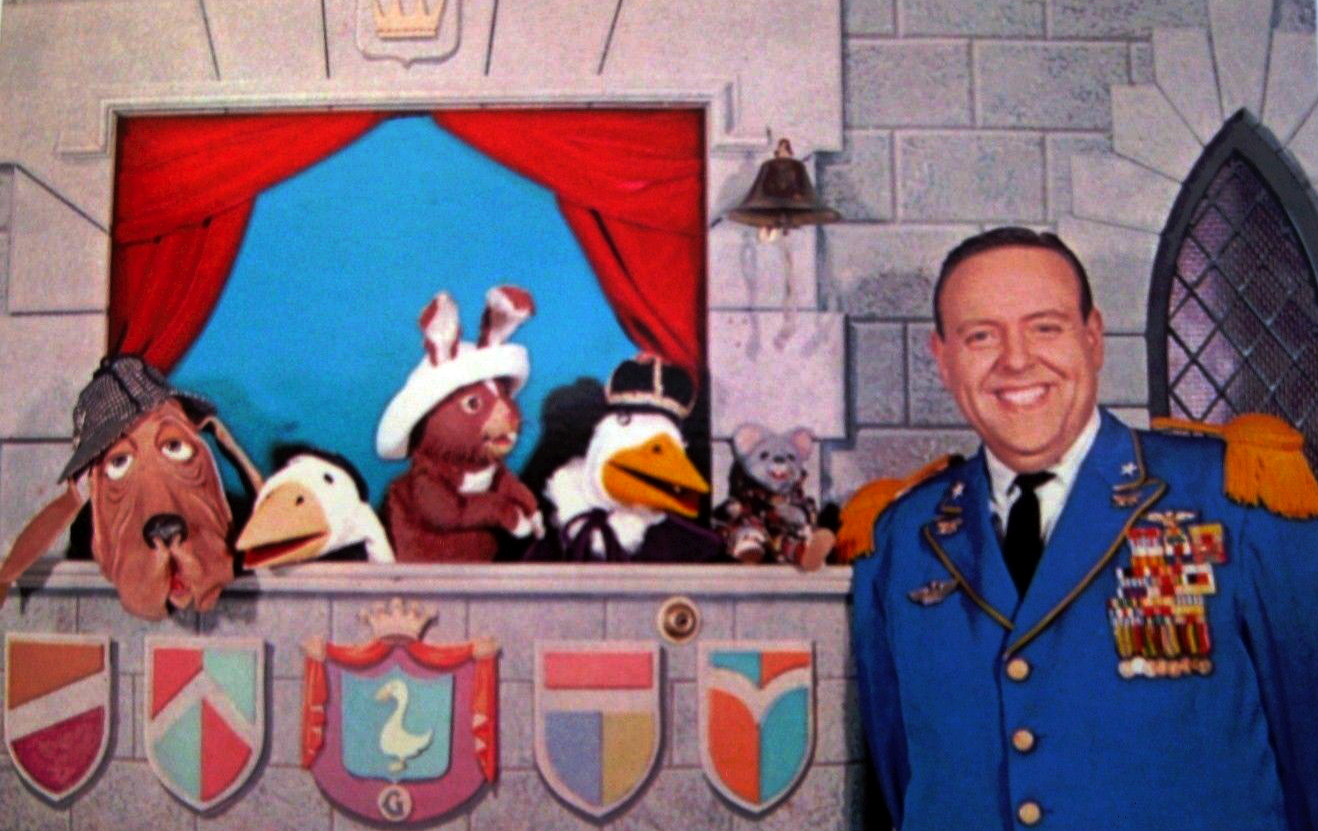
- Thomas on Garfield Goose and Friends
- Born: William Frazier Thomas; June 13, 1918; Rushville, Indiana
- Died: April 3, 1985 (aged 66); Chicago, Illinois
- Spouse: Ann Deeds Thomas
- Children: 2
- Presenting career
- Show: I Cover the Movies; Inside Radio; BC Battle of the Bands; Collect Calls From Lowenthal; Morning Matinee; The 50 Club; What's The Answer; Shopper's Special; Meet the Little People; The Frazier Thomas Show; Musical Nite-cap; Petticoat Party; Garfield Goose and Friend; Garfield Goose and Friends; Family Classics; Bozo's Circus
- Stations: WLW, WLWT and WKRC-TV, Cincinnati; WBKB/WBBM-TV, WBKB-TV/WLS-TV and WGN-TV, Chicago

William Frazier Thomas (June 13, 1918 – April 3, 1985) was a Chicago television personality. Although Thomas wrote nine children's books, he was best known for creating, hosting, writing and producing the long-running children's television program Garfield Goose and Friends on WGN-TV.

== Magic and broadcasting ==
Thomas began performing as a magician at age 12 in his home town of Rushville; he was just a teenager when he wrote a book about magic. As "Thomas the Magician and Company" he performed "the Mystic Revue, a full evening of magic, mirth, music and mystery" throughout the US. By 1935, he was writing a weekly syndicated newspaper column for children about magic, at first as "Thomas the Magician" and later as Frazier Thomas. The tips and tricks Thomas covered in his column were simple enough for young readers to perform successfully. His column appeared in newspapers from 1935 to 1940. Thomas was a member of the Society of American Magicians and attended their national conferences. By 1936, Thomas had an additional interest: radio; he became the host of a summer replacement show about movies for Cincinnati radio station WLW. A year later, he interviewed Edgar Bergen and became interested enough in ventriloquilism and dummies to visit the Chicago workshop of the man who produced Charlie McCarthy.

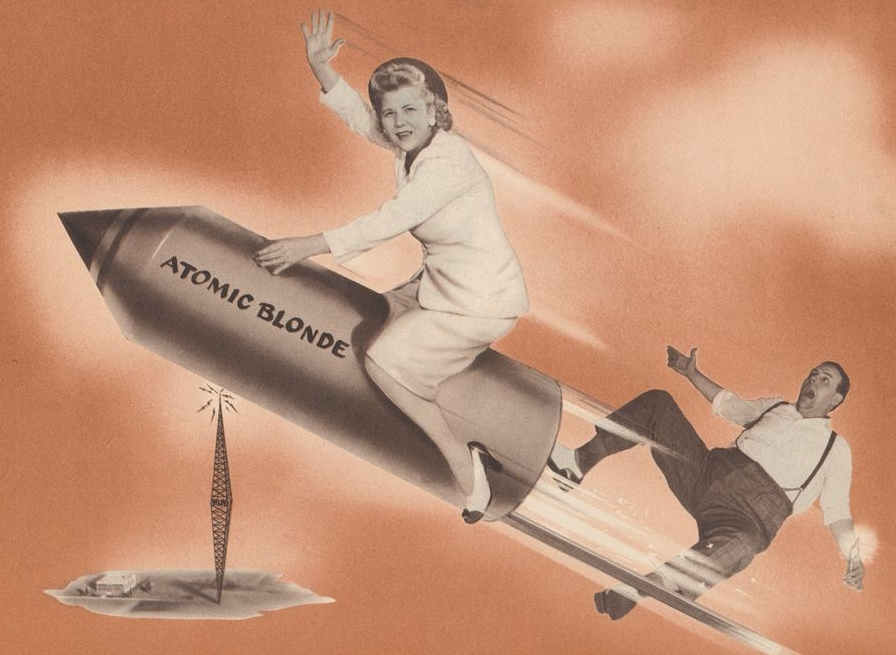
Thomas and Ruth Lyons at WLW Radio's Morning Matinee, 1948. Taken from a station-issued promotional calendar.

He continued working at WLW, writing and creating his own shows: I Cover the Movies and Inside Radio and as a disk jockey for others, such as BC Battle of the Bands. He was then teamed with Ruth Lyons for Collect Calls From Lowenthal. Still at WLW, the pair moved to a morning radio show, Morning Matinee (later called The 50 Club), which Thomas co-hosted with Lyons for eight years. During this time he also did personal appearances with other WLW air personalities, serving as the announcer and as a magician. In 1949, he announced he would leave Morning Matinee to establish his own radio and television production firm. He married Ann Deeds, a commercial artist for WLWT, and together the couple hosted one of the station's first television shows: Shopper's Special. Thomas then moved to Cincinnati's WKRC-TV, where he hosted his first children's program, Meet the Little People. In 1950, Frazier and Anne Thomas were among the top local television personalities in Cincinnati. Garfield Goose made his first television appearance in Cincinnati.

== Garfield Goose ==
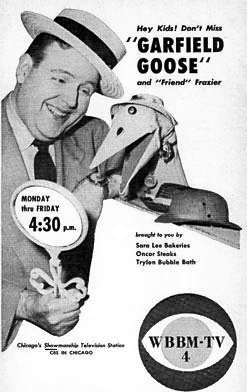
Advertisement for Garfield Goose on WBBM-TV, from 1953.

Thomas had the idea for Garfield Goose from attending bazaars as a boy. The local Catholic nuns used a sock puppet made into the form of a goose to ask children for charity donations. The children would "feed" the goose their pennies. He came up with the idea to use a goose puppet on his television show for giving prizes to children. The name of the goose was taken from the telephone number of the television station; at the time, all telephone exchanges had names as well as numbers. The name of the telephone exchange for the television station was Garfield.

In 1951, Thomas was hired by Chicago television station WBKB for an afternoon variety show initially called The Frazier Thomas Show. He also put in some time as the host of an evening music program, Musical Nite-cap. Thomas' afternoon show was renamed Petticoat Party; his announcer for it was Ray Rayner. Garfield Goose made his Chicago debut on Petticoat Party. It was not long before the station saw that Thomas and his goose puppet were the most popular parts of the program. On September 29, 1952, Frazier and Garfield went on their own in a show called Garfield Goose and Friend; the show went on the air directly opposite NBC's Howdy Doody.

This was a time of great transition in Chicago television. WBKB was acquired by CBS in February 1953 and renamed WBBM-TV. The WBKB call letters were then picked up by what was previously WENR-TV, owned by ABC. A clause in the contract for the WBKB sale to CBS called for all programs currently on the station to remain on the air for one year after the sale. Before the transition period was over, Thomas and his goose moved to the new WBKB (now WLS-TV), now under ABC's management. One year later, in 1955, the pair found their permanent television home at WGN-TV, where they would be joined by the other characters, making it Garfield Goose and Friends.

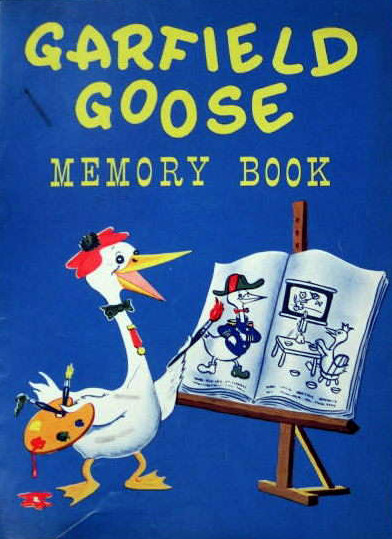
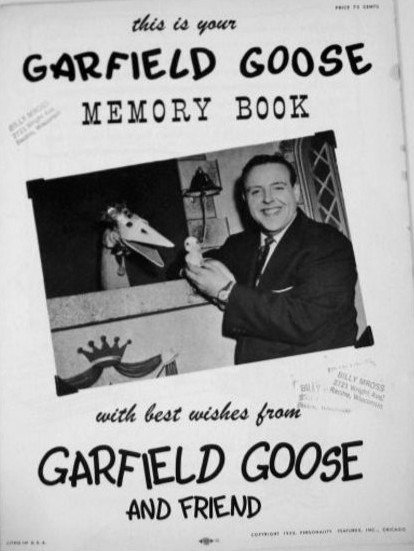
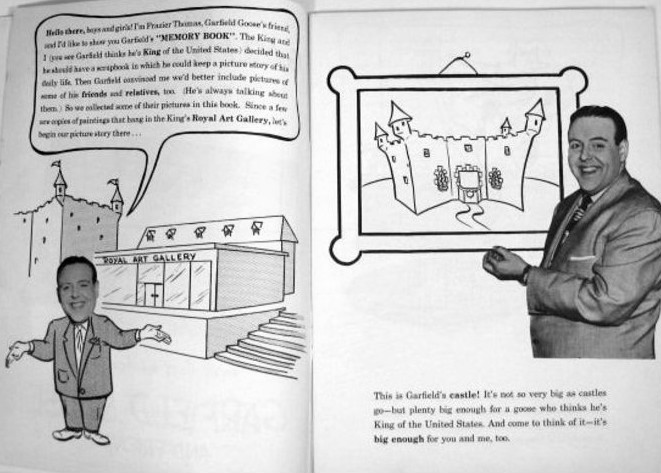

With the show's popularity among young viewers in the Chicago area by 1953, Thomas produced a book for them, Garfield Goose Memory Book. Thomas told the story of Garfield Goose from his youth, including information about his family and his average day in the castle. Roy Brown illustrated the 32-page booklet, which was also intended to be used as a coloring book.

In addition to entertaining, Thomas also educated his young viewers, but never with a heavy hand. His guests were people like Dr. Lester Fisher of Chicago's Lincoln Park Zoo and J. Bruce Mitchell of the Museum of Science and Industry whose visits were both fun and informative. Thomas also had a Hobby Corner feature where children would talk about and display things they were interested in.

There were also subtle moral messages when Thomas needed to explain to Garfield why something he had done or wanted to do was wrong. During the holidays, Thomas sang "Jingle Bells" in Latin, teaching the words and their meaning to his television audience. Children and their parents were invited to write for a copy of the words; it took Thomas weeks to mail all the replies. On occasion, Thomas would take his Jew's harp from his pocket and begin to play. His goose friend would respond to the music by either retreating to another part of his castle or hitting Thomas on the head with his beak. He also visited local schools to perform magic shows. The Chicago chapter of the National Academy of Television Arts and Sciences did not begin awarding local Emmys until 1958; Thomas was the first winner of the award for Male Best Children's Performer, and won the award again in 1964 for his work with Garfield Goose and Friends and Family Classics.

== Family Classics and other work ==
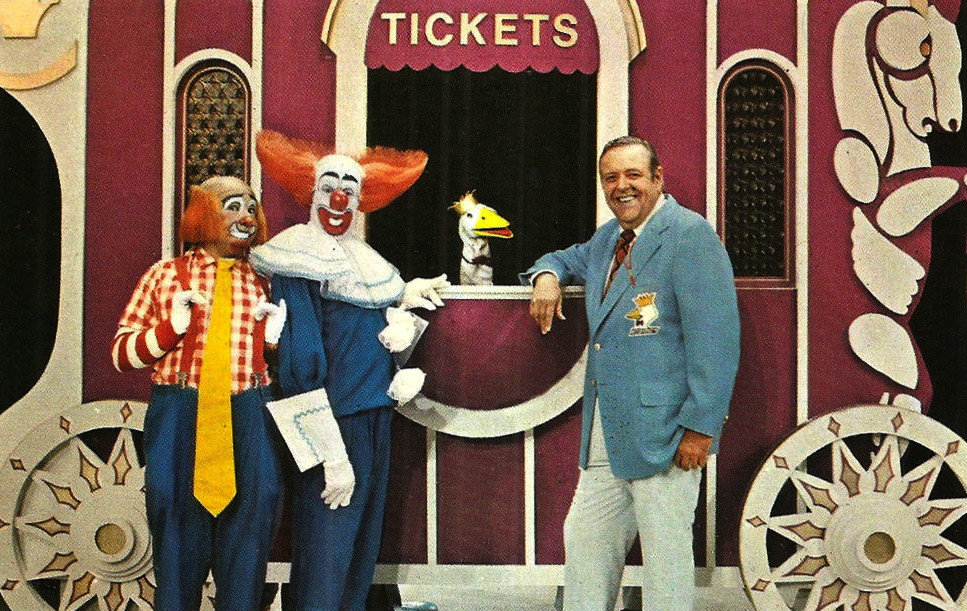
Frazier and Garfield join Bozo's Circus in 1976. Roy Brown (Cooky the Clown) and Bob Bell (Bozo) are also pictured.

In 1961, WGN-TV had an extensive library of films which were suitable for family viewing, but were rarely aired. Fred Silverman, who was a WGN executive at the time, came up with an idea for putting the films to use. He wanted to air them when children and their parents could watch and enjoy them with Frazier Thomas as the show's host. Thomas agreed to host the program provided he had editing rights on the films, was able to choose them himself and also to refuse any titles he believed were not suitable for the show. A set designed by Thomas that resembled a cozy home library complete with a Roy Brown painting of Garfield Goose was built and he began his Family Classics weekly show on Friday evenings. Family Classics became so successful, it was beating many of the network programs in the Chicago market. The networks responded by purchasing new movies to air in the same time slot; this made it necessary for the program to move to Sunday afternoons. The Family Classics set is now part of the Museum of Broadcast Communications' collection.

Thomas also brought a movie camera on his vacations and the footage he shot became specials for the station. The Thomas family's vacation on an 85-foot (26 m) schooner became Sailing the Seas of Columbus and their trip to England resulted in The Legend of Arthur, the Phantom King.

By the 1970s the way Chicago children watched television had changed, and Garfield Goose and Friends moved to mornings on WGN. When Ned Locke, ringmaster of Bozo's Circus retired in 1976, Thomas was asked to become his replacement. This meant that the show would combine with Bozo's Circus; Garfield Goose and Friends last aired on September 10, 1976. Frazier's friends were off the air permanently on January 26, 1981, after changes to the Bozo program. He continued to work on the show as the circus manager and to host Family Classics.

== Death ==
Thomas suffered a stroke at the WGN-TV studios on April 1, 1985, and died on April 3, 1985. He had hosted the local Easter Seals telethon the day before he was stricken. He was survived by his wife, Ann, his daughter, Kitty, and his son, Jeff. Thomas received the Chicago Academy of Television Arts and Sciences' Governors' Award for his television work posthumously in 1985. The Thomas family donated Garfield and the rest of the puppets, along with Thomas' uniform, to the Museum of Broadcast Communications. The 2500 block of West Bradley Place in Chicago in front of WGN-TV's studios is honorarily named "Frazier Thomas Place" in his memory. In 2005, the Museum of Broadcast Communications awarded WGN-TV's Studio 1 a plaque to commemorate the forty years of children's television broadcast from the studio. Garfield Goose and Friends with a likeness of Thomas and Garfield, is on the plaque along with Ray Rayner with Ray Rayner and Friends and Bob Bell and Bozo's Circus.

== Bibliography ==
- Hollis, Tim (2001). Hi There, Boys and Girls! America's Local Children's TV Programs. University Press of Mississippi. ISBN 978-1-578-06396-3. via Project MUSE (subscription required)
- Okuda, Ted; Mulqueen, Jack (2004). The Golden Age of Chicago Children's Television. Lake Claremont Press. ISBN 978-1-893-12117-1.
