= Garfield Goose and Friends =

Chicago children's television show (1952-1976)

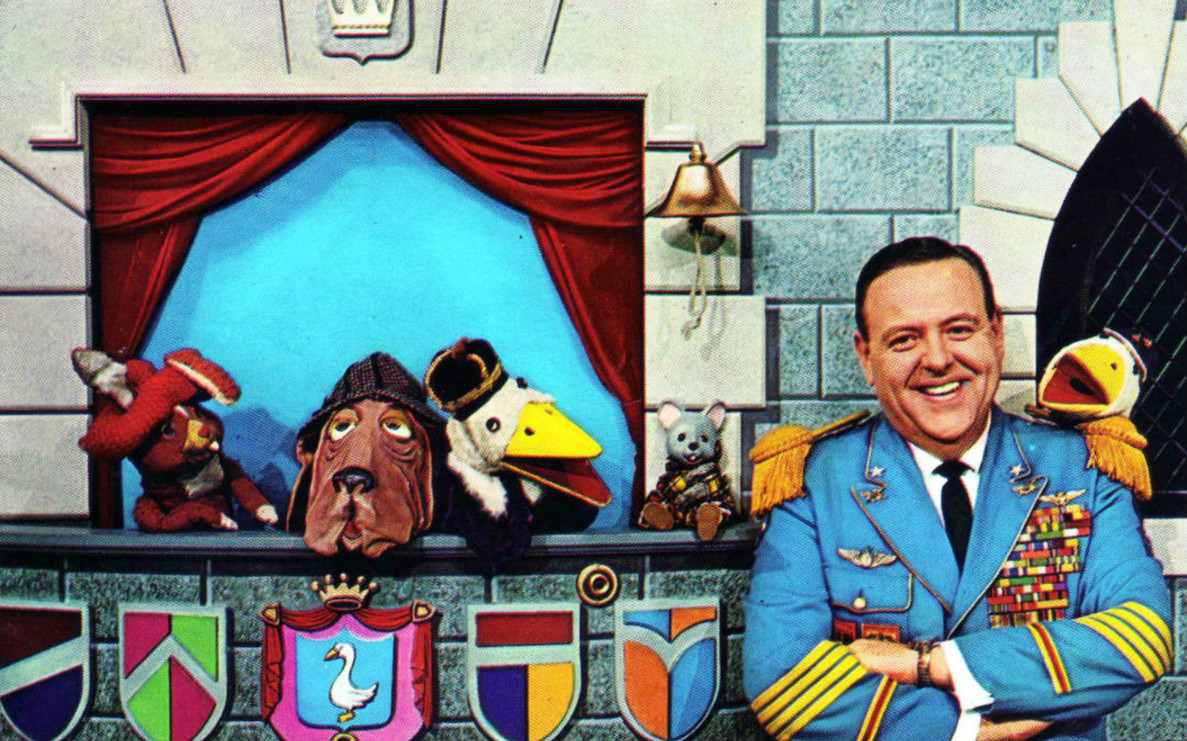
- Romberg Rabbit, Beauregard Burnside III, Garfield Goose, Mackintosh Mouse, Frazier Thomas and Chris Goose on Garfield Goose and Friends.
- Also known as: Garfield Goose and Friend
- Genre: Children's program
- Created by: Frazier Thomas
- Written by: Frazier Thomas
- Directed by: Ron Weiner
- Starring: Frazier Thomas; Roy Brown
- Theme music composer: Ethel Smith
- Opening theme: "Monkey on a String"; Trumpets heard are from "Cinderella" and were added through editing.
- Ending theme: "Monkey on a String"
- Country of origin: United States
- Original language: English
- No. of seasons: 24 (2 on WBKB/WBBM, 1 on WBKB (now WLS), 21 on WGN)

Production
- Producer: Frazier Thomas

Original release
- Network: WBKB-TV/WBBM-TV (1952–1954) WBKB-TV (now WLS-TV) (1954–1955) WGN-TV (1955–1976)
- Release: September 29, 1952 – October 1, 1976

Garfield Goose and Friends is a children's television show produced by WGN-TV in Chicago, Illinois, United States, from 1955 to 1976. The show was known as Garfield Goose and Friend from 1952 to 1955 when it aired on WBKB and WBBM-TV. It was the longest running puppet show on television until Sesame Street broke that record. The host of the show was Frazier Thomas, who did all of the talking. The show centered on a clacking goose puppet named Garfield Goose, who considered himself "King of the United States." There were many other puppet characters such as Romberg Rabbit, Macintosh Mouse, Chris Goose (Garfield's nephew who was born on Christmas, hence "Christmas Goose") and a sleepy bloodhound called Beauregard Burnside III (whose name happened to be a mix of two American Civil War generals). The show used a "Little Theater Screen", upon which the camera would zoom before cartoons such as Total Television, The Funny Company, Clutch Cargo, The Pink Panther, Jay Ward, Hanna-Barbera, Space Angel and The Mighty Hercules were broadcast.

== History ==
=== Cincinnati ===
Thomas created Garfield Goose for a local television program he hosted in Cincinnati. Thomas, who was an Indiana native and had worked on Cincinnati local radio since before World War II, said he got the idea when he saw Catholic nuns with a sock puppet in the form of a goose, with which they invited children to "feed the goose" with donations for charity. He wanted to do something special to award prizes to children on his television show, so he created a Garfield Goose puppet for that purpose. "Garfield" was the television station's telephone exchange. In Cincinnati, Garfield Goose lived in a cuckoo clock, since he had always wanted to be a cuckoo bird.

=== Chicago and WBKB ===
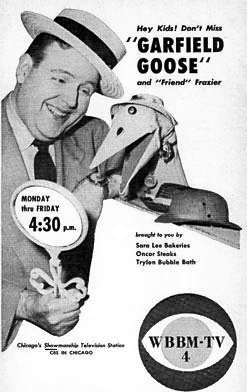
Ad for the show before July 1953 when WBBM-TV began to broadcast as Channel 2.

In 1951 Thomas and Garfield Goose moved to Chicago and CBS affiliate WBKB-TV, which was then on Channel 4. At first, the goose was a character on Petticoat Party, a variety show hosted by Thomas. Later, when the character was thought to have enough appeal for a show of its own, Garfield Goose and Friend debuted on September 29, 1952 with Chicago puppeteer Bruce Newton. The actual first puppeteer for Garfield was a WBKB secretary, Lee Ann Prineas, who left her clerical duties while the show was on the air. The show aired directly opposite NBC's Howdy Doody. In early broadcasts, Thomas hosted the show in a suit and tie, but on October 16, 1952, Garfield appointed him Admiral of his navy and his Prime Minister. making it necessary for Thomas to wear the uniform he is most remembered in. The uniform is now part of the Museum of Broadcast Communications collection.

At the time the show began, the American Federation of Radio Artists union began to recognize those working in television, becoming the American Federation of Television and Radio Artists. This made it necessary for television performers to become members of the union and to receive at least union scale wages for their work, which was above current station salaries in many cases. Those who appeared on camera or who had voice roles were now subject to union regulations. The television station indicated that it was only willing to pay a union-scale wage for one performer on the Garfield Goose program. This obviously was Frazier Thomas, and it meant that any role played by Bruce Newton would be paid as non-union scale; he had to stay off-camera and could not speak.

Newton had Garfield Goose communicate with Thomas through an off-screen typewriter but Newton was soon replaced by Roy Brown; Brown later created the rest of the show's puppet characters. Newton's own account in an interview for The Golden Age of Chicago Children's Television has him quitting the show and suggesting Thomas contact the Chicago Academy of Fine Arts for a replacement. Thomas did just that and became connected with Roy Brown in this way.

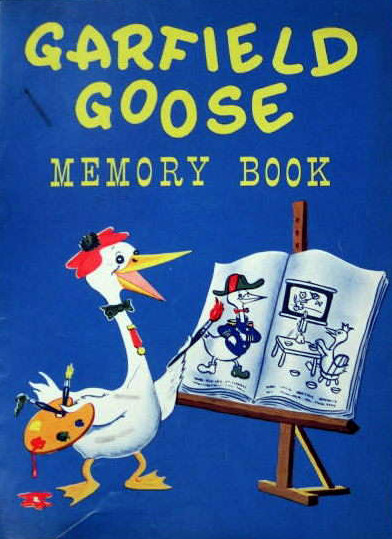
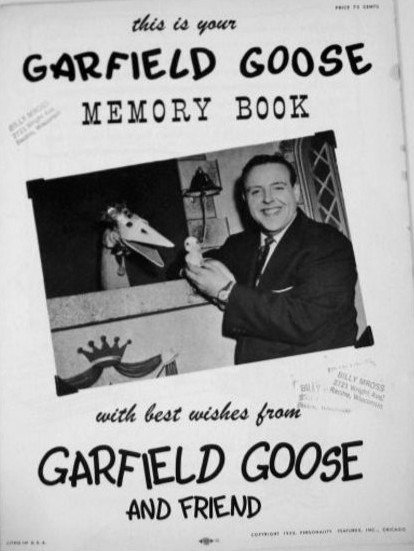
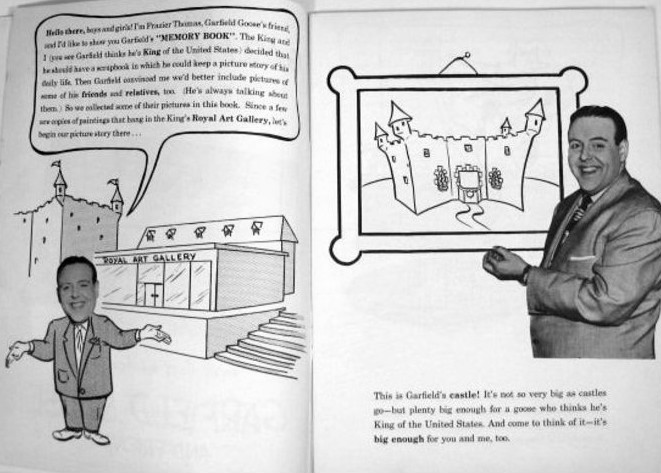

Roy Brown became the graphic artist for the show; he and Thomas quickly redesigned the Garfield puppet. Although Brown was still an art student and had no previous experience as a puppeteer when Thomas hired him for the show, Brown's talents for this type of work were quickly visible. Years after the program had left the air, Brown talked about his time working with Thomas, whom he described as a perfectionist. During those years of working together, Thomas granted Brown the ability to be creative with the show's characters; Brown discovered a slight hand movement which made it appear as if Garfield Goose was smiling. Thomas was able to converse with the show's characters as if they were friends or neighbors, and to talk with his young audience without talking down to them. It was the working chemistry between the two men which made the show memorable and allowed it to become the longest-running puppet show on television.

The program was popular enough with Chicago area children in 1953 to inspire Frazier Thomas and Roy Brown to collaborate for a book, Garfield Goose Memory Book, with Thomas writing the story of Garfield Goose and Brown doing the illustrations for it. In it, Thomas detailed information such as the names of Garfield's parents, Georgia (born in the state), and Godfrey, that he had a sister, Gloria, a brother in law, Gilbert, and a young nephew, Christmas. This branch of the Goose family spent summers in Goosejaw, Saskatchewan, and wintered in Goose Bay, Florida. Thomas and Brown also provided a picture of Garfield's average day in his castle along with information about his younger years. The book was also able to be used as a coloring book.

The first addition to the cast came when the show was just over a year old. The storyline was that Garfield had hired a butler without the knowledge of Frazier, who learned of it through a phone call from the employment agency. He arrived on Thanksgiving Day 1953, and was a capuchin monkey named Geronimo. Geronimo was with the show even after it moved to WGN-TV. The next new cast member appeared on Christmas Day after some confusion. Garfield gave Frazier a note saying he would be having Christmas Goose for the holidays. Thomas was aghast at the thought of roast goose being served. Garfield's hastily typed reply said that Christmas Goose, his nephew, was staying with his uncle for the holidays.

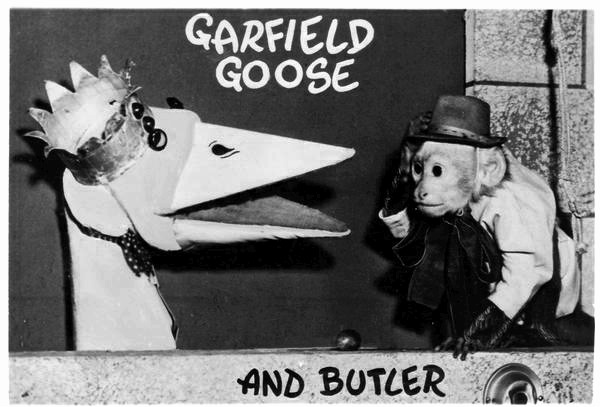
Geronimo, the butler, arrives: Thanksgiving Day, 1953.

WBKB-TV was sold in February 1953 and became WBBM-TV, the CBS owned-and-operated station, which moved to Channel 2. The initial sale contract for WBKB to CBS called for a one-year period where the new ownership agreed to keep all present programs on the station. Before the transition period was over, Garfield Goose and Friend moved to the new WBKB-TV, an ABC owned-and-operated station which jumped to channel 7. During this period, the show was briefly carried nationally on the ABC network. At the time, Chicago did not have a Thanksgiving Day parade to usher in the beginning of the Christmas holiday season. The State Street Council produced a television show instead, featuring popular local children's shows. Shown on both WBKB and WGN-TV in 1954, Garfield Goose was part of the broadcast. On the show's last day on WBKB in 1955, Garfield said he would drive the castle away, while Thomas tried telling him it was impossible. The castle then rolled out of camera range, thanks to casters installed by the stage crew. The show began airing on its permanent television home, WGN-TV, the next day.

=== WGN ===
Roy Brown created, built, and/or performed numerous puppet characters for other WGN-TV children's shows; one of the first of Brown's new characters to be introduced to Garfield Goose was Romberg Rabbit, after the show moved to WGN-TV. Romberg had been featured on another children's show, Quiet Riot (hosted by Buddy Black) and after that show left the air, Romberg joined Garfield Goose, where he was introduced as an "unemployed magician's assistant." With the addition of Romberg Rabbit, Thomas began calling the program Garfield Goose and Friends (pluralizing the title) and Romberg began "translating" for Garfield.

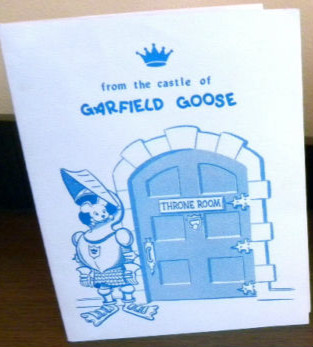
Roy Brown created items like this greeting card for young viewers.

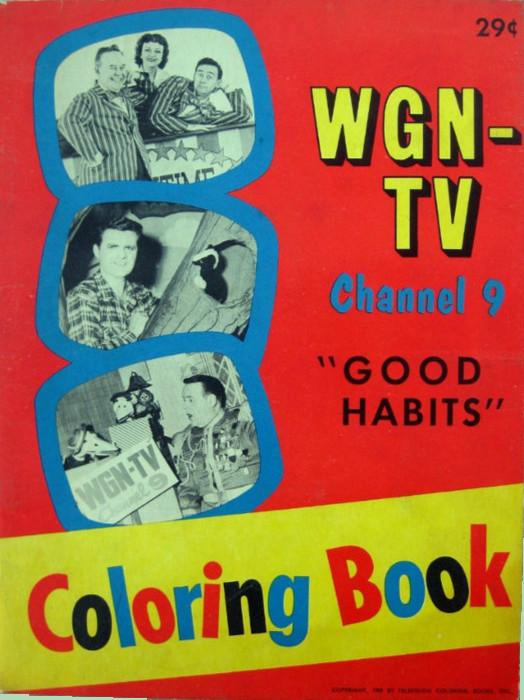
WGN-TV coloring book, 1959. Garfield, Frazier and friends.

Other characters were also introduced. They included: bloodhound Beauregard Burnside III, who was the chief of Garfield's secret service and who readily fell asleep, prompting Thomas to pick up one of Beau's ears and call out "hot dogs, hamburgers, spaghetti and meatballs!" to rouse him; Macintosh Mouse, who was in charge of the castle's mailroom. Some of Garfield's relatives visited regularly, including nephew Christmas "Chris" Goose and seasonal visitor "Mama" Goose (actually the Garfield Goose puppet with a wig and granny glasses). Since only Thomas could understand what Romberg and the other characters communicated, Thomas would repeat what the puppets "said" for viewers to understand. Garfield would also go down into his castle and type a note (viewers would hear the sound of a typewriter), bringing it up for Thomas to read aloud.

The program was both entertaining and subtly educational. Guests from the Museum of Science and Industry, Lincoln Park Zoo, and the show's own viewers with their hobby projects made learning interesting and also fun. In 1968, the understated educational aspect of the program saved a four-year-old boy's life. He and his older brother had fallen through ice at a creek near their home. The boys' mother responded to her older son's cries for help; after rescuing them, her younger son was not breathing. The mother knew how to respond to this emergency because of a Garfield Goose segment about scouting where a short film about life saving was shown. Remembering what she had seen in the film when she watched the program with her sons, she was able to revive her four-year-old. The show also had a quiet moral tone, as Thomas would explain to Garfield why something he had done or wanted to do was wrong.

Thomas' performances with a Jew's harp either drove the King of the United States to find a place in his castle out of earshot or to simply hit his Prime Minister and Admiral of his navy on the head. When Thomas sang "Jingle Bells" in Latin on the program during the holidays, he explained the meaning of the words to his young audience, and offered to send copies of the words to anyone who wrote to him. He was inundated with requests; it took weeks to deal with sending all the replies. In addition to hosting the weekday show, Thomas wrote all the scripts and produced the program. The local chapter of the Academy of Television Arts and Sciences did not begin awarding Emmys until 1958; the first recipient of the Best Male Children's Performer was Thomas; he won another award in 1964.

The show remained on WGN-TV (channel 9), which bought the rights in 1955, for over two decades, most of this time running in the late afternoon after children had come home from school. In 1957, Pat Weaver, who created the Today and Tonight shows for NBC, had hopes of starting a fourth network. WGN-TV also hoped to be able to syndicate some of its more popular programs through it; one of them was Garfield Goose and Friends. During the early 1970s, the program slowly lost viewership to competition and was moved to weekday mornings. The show's long run ended on September 10, 1976.

=== Bozo's Circus ===
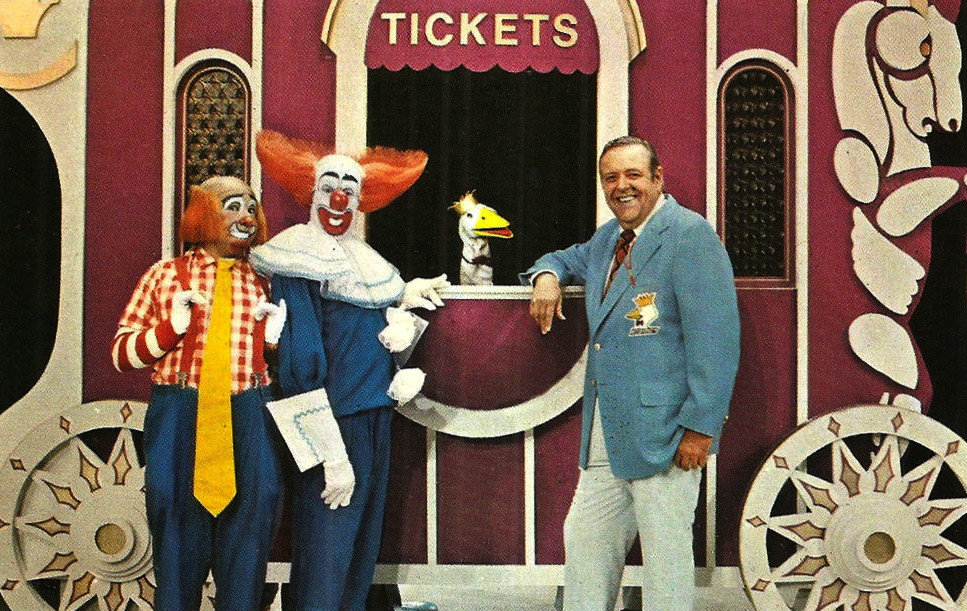
Frazier and Garfield join Bozo's Circus in 1976. Roy Brown (Cooky the Clown) and Bob Bell (Bozo) are also pictured.

Frazier Thomas had taken the role of "circus manager" on WGN-TV's longtime hit program Bozo's Circus after the retirement of Ringmaster Ned Locke in 1976. Thomas kept his puppets on the air with a storyline in which Garfield "bought" Bozo's Circus. The puppets made daily appearances until 1981. Thomas worked on Bozo's Circus, later retitled The Bozo Show, until his death in 1985. In 1987, the puppets were donated to The Museum of Broadcast Communications in Chicago. The display initially included Garfield Goose, Romberg Rabbit, Macintosh Mouse, Beauregard Burnside III, Christmas Goose, and Ali Gator (the latter a character who appeared only briefly in a serialized adventure during the show's early years). Ali Gator was later removed from the museum's display.

== Aftermath ==
After quitting the show early on and against Frazier Thomas and Roy Brown's wishes, Bruce and Claire Newton mounted a live, traveling Garfield Goose Telepuppets show at neighborhood events for many years after the series had gone off the air, alongside other non-Garfield Goose puppets built and performed by the pair for other shows. To Thomas and Brown's chagrin, WGN-TV management chose not to pursue the matter. Although Bruce Newton would later claim his traveling show featured the first Garfield Goose puppet used on WBKB-TV, a 1991 news story described this puppet as a prototype. After Thomas' death, Newton attempted to claim that Garfield Goose was entirely his idea. The general manager of WBKB-TV at the time the program first went on the air, Sterling "Red" Quinlan, says it was Frazier Thomas who came up with the concept of Garfield Goose.

As often happened during the 1950s and early 1960s (such as with The Tonight Show Starring Johnny Carson or the first Super Bowl game), Garfield Goose and Friends aired live for much of its history. WGN did not keep many tapes of its local productions, including Garfield Goose And Friends. Rather, since the reels of videotape were very costly, they were thriftily recycled. Station management did not foresee how valuable recordings of these broadcasts would have become. Only four complete episodes were preserved: March 14–15, 1974, and September 9–10, 1976 (the latter two being the final two shows aired in the series).

In December 2005, WGN-TV ran a primetime special called Bozo, Gar and Ray: WGN TV Classics, which carried the earliest known saved clip of the show, wherein Garfield Goose had "luckily" gotten hold of tickets to the 1959 World Series at Chicago's Comiskey Park. As it happened at the time of this 2005 broadcast, the White Sox had won the 2005 World Series, which moreover was their first World Series appearance since 1959. Additional color kinescope footage from 1965 came from a vintage WGN-TV sales film which also includes some scenes from Bozo's Circus. The broadcast garnered #1 ratings in the Chicago market and is rerun annually during the holiday season.

In 2005, the Museum of Broadcast Communications awarded WGN-TV's Studio 1 a plaque to commemorate the forty years of children's television broadcast from the studio. Garfield Goose and Friends with a likeness of Frazier Thomas and Garfield, is on the plaque along with Ray Rayner for Ray Rayner and Friends and Bob Bell with Bozo's Circus.

== Bibliography ==
- Hollis, Tim (2001). Hi There, Boys and Girls! America's Local Children's TV Programs. University Press of Mississippi. ISBN 978-1-578-06396-3 – via Project MUSE.
- Okuda, Ted; Mulqueen, Jack (2004). The Golden Age of Chicago Children's Television. Lake Claremont Press. ISBN 978-1-893-12117-1.
