= Don Sandburg =

American writer, actor, and producer (1930–2018)

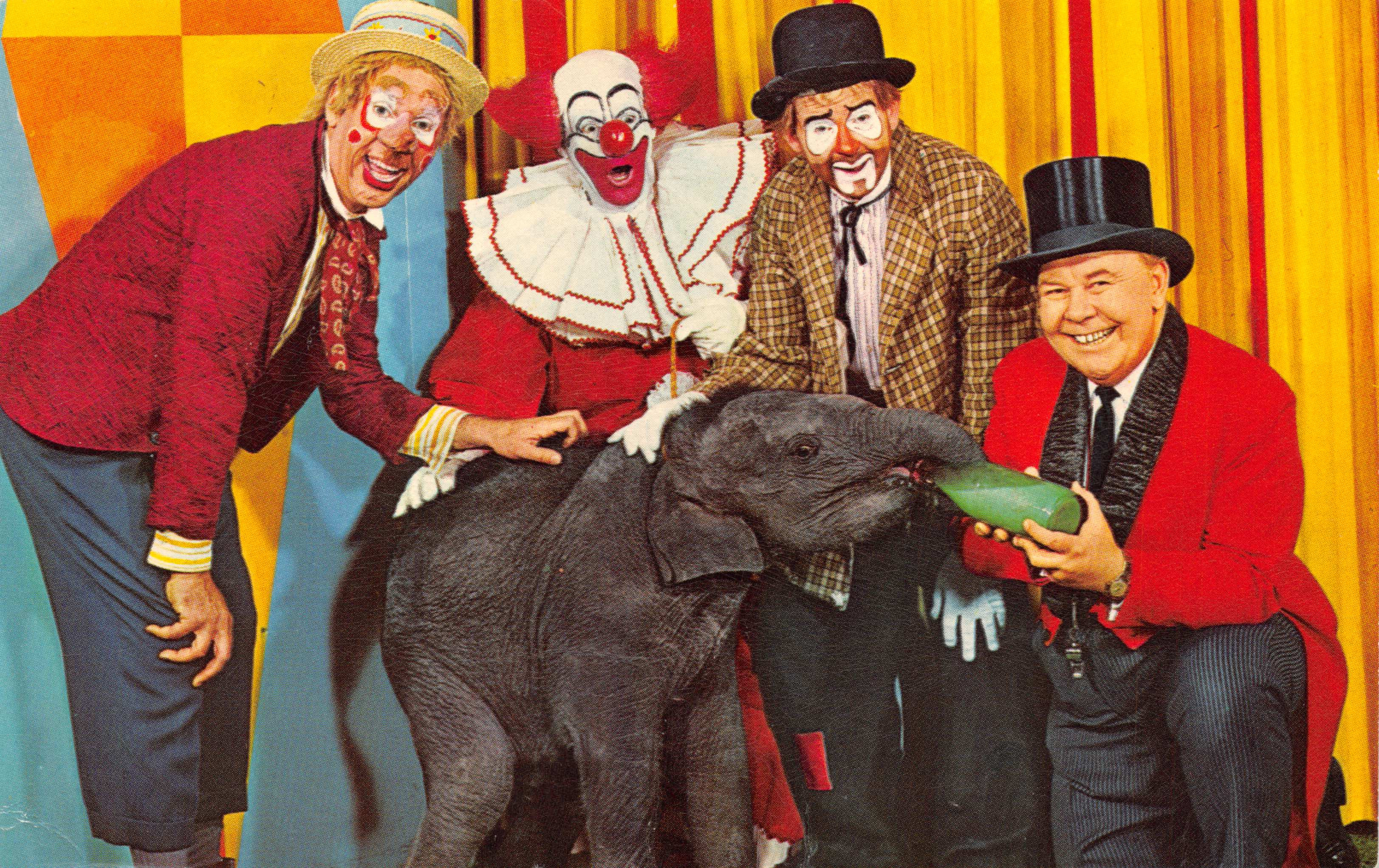
Photo postcard of Oliver O. Oliver (Ray Rayner), Bozo the Clown (Bob Bell), Sandy the Clown (Don Sandburg), and Ringmaster Ned (Ned Locke) on Bozo's Circus on WGN-TV.

Don Sandburg (1930 – October 6, 2018) was an American writer, actor, and producer who worked in television, most notably as producer of The Banana Splits for Hanna-Barbera as well as WGN-TV's Bozo's Circus.

== Career ==
=== Early career ===
Sandburg started in television on WCPO in Cincinnati, Ohio when he was 21. He was initially a prop manager but later became production supervisor for The Paul Dixon Show. He left after a year, hoping to get work in Denver, Colorado but ended up doing a series of other jobs until returning to Cincinnati with WLW Radio and WLWT-TV in 1953, where he joined Wally Phillips and Bob Bell to produce, direct and write The Walt Phillips Show. When WLW and WLWT's executive vice president moved to WGN Radio and Television, he brought Phillips, Bell and Sandburg along.

=== Bozo's Circus ===
When WGN-TV started Bozo in 1960, Sandburg was not involved with the show until after it went to an hour format as Bozo's Circus in 1961. He was approached by station management to write for the program – he already wrote material for a morning program, Breakfast With Bugs Bunny, that evolved into Ray Rayner and His Friends – but refused, suggesting instead that he be hired to appear as a character on air, offering to write material for the show at no extra charge (union pay rates for on-air talent were higher than for writing). WGN agreed, and the character Sandy the Tramp was born. Sandy was a mute clown reminiscent of silent film comedians, although Sandburg said he primarily based the character on Harpo Marx. Eventually, Sandburg would be named the show's producer as well. He was instrumental in the creation of the "Grand Prize Game". By 1965, Larry Harmon added Sandburg's "Sandy" and Ray Rayner's Oliver O. Oliver to Bozo the Clown coloring books. In 1967, Sandburg appeared in local McDonald's ads as Ronald McDonald.

=== After Bozo ===
Sandburg left the show in 1969, deflated by the pace of four jobs on the show as performer, writer and producer. He left for Los Angeles hoping to find work at the Disney studios, where he had a friend. When the Disney job didn't pan out, he called on an old friend and former WGN-TV programming executive, Fred Silverman, who got him the job as producer of The Banana Splits.

Afterward Sandburg worked as a writer on New Zoo Revue, and for various stations and studios in Los Angeles, including Paramount where he worked on the Star Trek animated series. He also worked at Marineland and as a theater director in the U.S. Virgin Islands, where he periodically produced variety shows, featuring some of the same entertainers he previously had booked to appear on Bozo's Circus. Magician Marshall Brodien (a former WGN colleague) participated in some of these shows, which Sandburg hosted in character as Sandy (with his secretary playing his sister, Samantha). For these shows, the Sandy character spoke; Sandburg described the voice as being somewhere in between Roy Brown's voice as "Cooky" and Bob Bell's voice as "Bozo."

Sandburg returned to WGN-TV to play Sandy on The Bozo 25th Anniversary Special (telecast live September 7, 1986); he also came back to play Sandy while Roy Brown was ill. Sandburg was part of The Bozo Show 30th Anniversary Special (aired September 8, 1991), and on the final episode of Bozo: the WGN-TV special Bozo: 40 Years Of Fun, aired July 14, 2001. One of his Sandy costumes is part of the collection of Bozo's Circus artifacts at the Museum of Broadcast Communications.

== Personal life ==
Sandburg and his wife lived in retirement in Oregon. He died of complications of Alzheimer's disease on October 6, 2018, at the age of 87.
