= TV Powww =

Television series

TV Powww (often stylized as TV POWWW) is a franchised television game show format, in which home viewers controlled a video game via telephone in hopes of winning prizes.

== History ==
The TV Powww format, produced and distributed by Florida syndicator Marvin Kempner, debuted in 1978 on Los Angeles station KABC-TV as part of A.M. Los Angeles, and by the start of the next decade was seen on 79 local television stations (including national superstation WGN as part of Bozo's Circus) in the United States, as well as several foreign broadcasters. While most stations had dropped TV Powww by the mid-1980s, stations in Australia and Italy were still using it as late as 1990.

Stations were originally supplied with games for the Fairchild Channel F console, but following Fairchild's withdrawal from the home video game market, Intellivision games were used. Kempner later unsuccessfully attempted to interest both Nintendo and Sega in a TV Powww revival.

While the underlying technology was standardized across participating stations, the format of TV Powww's presentation varied from market to market. Many presented TV Powww as a series of segments that ran during the commercial breaks of television programming (a la Dialing for Dollars), while some (such as KTTV in Los Angeles) presented TV Powww as a standalone program.

== Gameplay ==
In the video game being featured, the at-home player would give directions over the phone while watching the game on their home screen. When the viewer determined that the weapon was aiming at the target, they said "Pow!", after which that weapon would activate.

Accounts vary as to what kind of controller technology was involved. Some sources state that the gaming consoles sent to the stations were modified for voice activation., while a 2008 WPIX station retrospective reported that stations without the special voice-activation-equipped consoles would have an employee in the control room manually hit the fire button when the caller said "Pow!" (or "Pix" (pronounced picks) in WPIX's case).

One of the pitfalls of the gameplay was that, due to broadcasting technicalities, there was significant lag in the transmission of a television signal. The player would experience this lag when playing at home, which likely made playing the game somewhat more difficult. (For similar reasons, such a game would be impossible in digital television without the use of a second video chat feed for the player, due to the time it takes to process and compress the video stream; most stations also mandate a seven-second delay to prevent obscenities from reaching the air.)

== Featured games ==
=== Channel F ===
There is video evidence for the following Fairchild Channel F games being played on TV Powww:

- Baseball
- Bowling
- Quadra-Doodle (used as a background)
- Shooting Gallery

Kempner marketing documentation also supports the following games being used:

- Dodge' It
- Maze
- Tic-Tac-Toe

=== Intellivision ===
There is video evidence for the following Intellivision games being played on TV Powww:

- Football
- Slots
- Soccer
- Single player Space Battle
- Two player Space Battle

Kempner marketing documentation and Marvin Kempner's autobiography suggest the following games were available or under development:

- Astrosmash
- Baseball
- Basketball
- Boxing
- Frog Bog
- Horse Racing
- Skiing
- Space Hawk
- Word Fun - Word Rockets
- Unspecified Intellivoice games

The Intellivision title Sharp Shot reportedly comprised four TV Powww games, implying that the simplified versions of the following titles found on this cartridge were also available to TV Powww customers:

- Advanced Dungeons & Dragons
- Sea Battle

== TV Powww variants ==
| City/Market | Local name | Host | Show Featured on | Network | Air dates |
|---|---|---|---|---|---|
| Boston, MA | TV Powww! | Unknown | Unknown | WXNE-TV | Unknown |
| Baltimore, MD | TV Powww! | Stu Kerr | Unknown | WMAR | Unknown |
| Battle Creek, MI | TV Powww! | Unknown | Star Blazers | WUHQ | Unknown |
| Calgary, Alberta | Switchback | Unknown | Unknown | CBRT | 1985 |
| Chicago, IL (Nationwide Cable) | Ray's TV Powww!, Bozo's TV Powww! | Ray Rayner, Frazier Thomas | Ray Rayner and His Friends, Bozo's Circus | WGN; Superstation WGN | 1979-1980 |
| Cleveland, OH | TV Powww! | Bob Zappe | Zap! | WKYC-TV | 1978–1979 |
| Cleveland, OH | TV Powww! | Candy Cramer | Video Arcade | WCLQ | 1982–1984 |
| Columbus, GA | TV Powww! | Unknown | Unknown | WYEA | Unknown |
| Dallas, TX | TV Powww! | B.J. Cleveland | Unknown | KXTX | Unknown |
| Dayton, OH | TV Powww! | Unknown; Unknown | Clubhouse 22 (children's version); Evening (adult version) | WKEF | Unknown; Unknown |
| Flint, MI | TV Powww! | Unknown | Unknown | WEYI | Unknown |
| Green Bay, WI | Clubhouse Powww! | Gerald "Uncle Jerry" Drake "Barney" | Weekday afternoons | WLUK-TV | c. 1979–1981 |
| Greensboro, NC | TV Powww! | Unknown | Captain Triad | WGGT | Unknown |
| Hartford, CT | TV Powww! | Unknown | Unknown | WTXX | Unknown |
| High Point, NC | TV Powww! | Unknown | Unknown | WGHP | Unknown |
| Hobart, Tasmania | TV Powww | "Jim Shoes" | Saturday Fun Show | TVT6 | 1980s |
| Honolulu, HI | TV Powww! | Fred "Professor Fun" Ball (children's version); Ron Wiley (adult version) | Unknown | KIKU | Unknown |
| Houston, TX | TV Kid POWWW | Unknown | Unknown | KHTV | Unknown |
| Jacksonville, FL | TV Powww! | Gary Rogers | Unknown | WAWS, WXAO/WNFT | 1981–1983, 1983–1984 |
| Kingsport, TN; Knoxville, TN | TV Powww! | Frances Eden | Unknown | WKPT; WTVK-TV | 1981 |
| Los Angeles, CA | TV Powww! | Regis Philbin | A.M. Los Angeles | KABC | 1978–? |
| Los Angeles, CA | TV Powww! | John Rovick | TV Powww | KTTV | 1979 |
| Los Angeles, CA | TV Powww! | Unknown | TV Powww | KCOP | Unknown |
| New York, NY | TV Pixxx | Ralph Lowenstein | N/A | WPIX | 197?–1982 |
| Newport News, VA | TV Powww! | Unknown | TV Powww! | WAVY-TV | Unknown |
| Oakland, CA (SF Bay Area) | TV Powww! | Pat McCormick | Spider-Man and Tom and Jerry | KTVU | 1970s–1980s |
| Regional & Remote Western Australia | TV Powww | Chris Mills | N/A | GWN7 | 1980s |
| Philippines | TV Powww | Various | N/A | BBC-2 | 1970s–1980s |
| Phoenix, AZ | TV Powww! | Unknown | Unknown | KPNX | Unknown |
| Raleigh, NC | TV Powww! | "Barney" | Barney's Army | WPTF-TV | 1979–1982 |
| Rochester, NY | TV Powww! | "Ranger Bob" | Ranger Bob’s Buckeroo Club | WUHF | 1981 |
| Rockhampton, Queensland | TV Powww | Unknown | Unknown | Unknown | Early 1980s |
| Sacramento, CA | TV Powww! | Mitch Agruss | Cap'n Mitch | KTXL | 1980 |
| San Diego, CA | TV Powww! | Unknown | Unknown | KCST | Unknown |
| São Paulo, Brazil | TV Powww! | Luis Ricardo; Mara Maravilha; Paulo Barboza; Gugu Liberato; Sérgio Mallandro; Tânia Alves; Christina Rocha | Show Maravilha | SBT | 1984–1989 |
| Salt Lake City, UT | TV Powww! | Unknown | Daily Movie | KSL-TV | Unknown |
| Spokane, WA | Q6 Powww! | Cal Fankhouser | Unknown | KHQ-TV | Unknown |
| United Kingdom | TV Powww | Peter Powell; Mark Curry | Get Set for Summer | BBC1 | 1982 |
| Wagga Wagga, New South Wales | TV Powww | Unknown | Unknown | RVN2 | Unknown |
| Waterbury, CT | TV Powww! | Unknown | Unknown | WTXX | Unknown |
| Wodonga, Victoria | TV Powww | Unknown | Unknown | AMV4 | Unknown |
| Youngstown, OH | TV Powww! | Unknown | Unknown | WYTV | Unknown |

=== TV Pixxx ===
One notable version of TV Powww was used by New York based television station WPIX, called TV-Pixxx (a play on the station's call letters). Hosted by station staff announcer Ralph Lowenstein, it was aired during the traditional weekday afternoon slot of children's TV as an interlude. Participants would be called at home to play a videogame that appeared on their screen.

Participants interacted with the game by saying the word "Pix" to perform game-related actions. Prizes included T-shirts and $10 U.S. savings bonds. They could double their prize or win a bonus prize (such as advance tickets to see upcoming films) by guessing a "Magic Word" (originally common everyday words, later in the last two years one of the 50 U.S. states). For a chance at playing, children could send a postcard with their name, address, and phone number to TV Pixxx.

WPIX's program lasted until 1982; for many New York viewers, TV Pixxx was their first glimpse of the Intellivision home game system.

In the Beastie Boys Book, Adam Horovitz claimed to be a regular viewer of the program, but was never picked to play the game, nor saw anyone actually win.

=== Switchback ===
Switchback aired on CBC Television station CBRT in Calgary, Alberta in 1985, also including Intellivision games.

=== Zap ===
In Cleveland, Ohio, Zap (named after host Bob Zappe) aired in the mornings from 1978 to 1979 on NBC station WKYC which had a feature similar to TV Powww.

=== International versions ===
==== Australia ====
In the early 1980s, Golden West Network (GWN) had a version called TV Powww (or possibly TV Pow), hosted by Chris Mills. There was a spaceship game, a boxing game and a soccer/football game.

A basic version of Space Invaders was broadcast daily after school hours in Rockhampton, north-east coast of Australia during the early 1980s. Children would yell "Pow!" over the telephone, with the host pressing the fire button in the studio. Reaction time varied with the mood of the host. The game was often chaotic, with contestant rapid firing, and sync abandoned when the host was unable to keep up.

WIN4 in Wollongong [WIN (TV station) - Wikipedia] built a spaceship set and had kids come into the studio to play TV Powww in the early eighties.

==== Brazil ====
The game premiered on SBT in August 1984 and its first host was Paulo Barboza. Shortly thereafter, other hosts like Tânia Alves, Mara Maravilha, Luís Ricardo, Sérgio Mallandro, Gugu Liberato and Christina Rocha presented the game. TV Powww! became a segment of the Bozo show in 1986 and continued until 1989.

The block also included foreign content, often cartoons the network had the rights to air, as fillers. On August 24, 1984, an episode of El Chavo del Ocho aired during the program, marking the arrival of the series on Brazilian television.

==== United Kingdom ====
The game had a 12 episode run as part of the BBC Saturday morning children's show Get Set For Summer between April 1982 and July 1982.

==== Colombia ====
In 1982 there was a variation of Tv Powww called Telectronico hosted by Reynaldo More (RTI TV on Inravisión Cadena 2). Children could participate by sending coupons from newspaper and waiting for the right phone call. Show took place Monday to Friday at 5:30 p.m.
