= Ray Rayner =

American television presenter

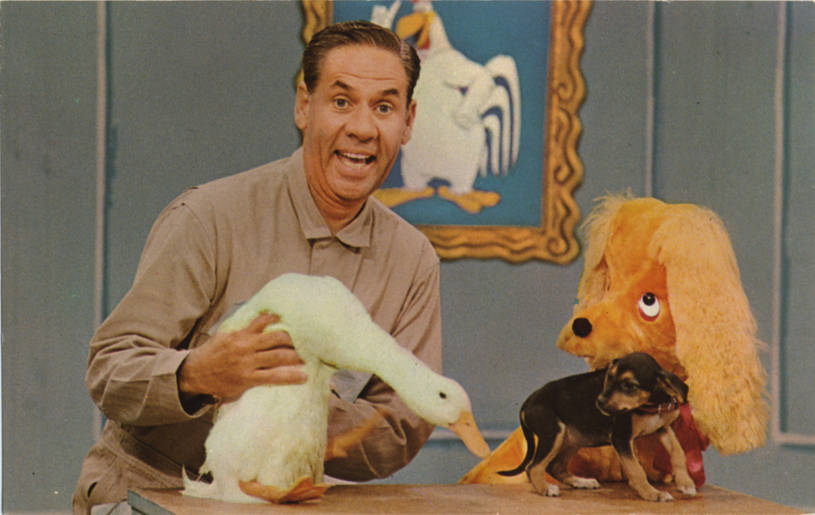
- Rayner with Chelveston and Cuddly Dudley on Ray Rayner and His Friends in 1968
- Born: Raymond M. Rahner; July 23, 1919; Queens, New York, U.S.
- Died: January 21, 2004 (aged 84); Fort Myers, Florida, U.S.
- Education: College of the Holy Cross; Fordham University; University of Chicago
- Spouses: Jeanne Rahner (m. 1949; died 1995) Marie Rahner (m. 1997)
- Children: 2
- Presenting career
- Show: Rayner Shine; The Ray Rayner Show; The Little Show; Popeye's Firehouse; The Dick Tracy Show; Ray Rayner and His Friends; Rocket to Adventure; Bozo's Circus
- Stations: WGGB; WOOD (AM); WBKB-TV (later WLS-TV); WBBM-TV; WGN-TV; KGGM-TV
- Country: US

Ray Rayner (born Raymond M. Rahner; July 23, 1919 – January 21, 2004) was an American television presenter, actor and author. He was a staple of Chicago children's television in the 1960s and 1970s on WGN-TV.

== Early life and education ==
Rayner (the name was initially spelled "Rahner" but pronounced "Rayner") grew up in Queens, New York. He attended the College of the Holy Cross in Worcester, Massachusetts. Rayner's first media job was for WGBB radio in Freeport on Long Island while he was attending night school at Fordham University.

== World War II service ==
He enlisted in the Army Air Forces, serving as the navigator of a B-17 during World War II, when he was shot down over France on April 3, 1943. During 2 1/2 years as a POW in Stalag Luft III, he helped prepare the escape depicted in the film The Great Escape—though he was transferred to another camp before the escape took place. It was during his time as a POW that he discovered his talent for entertaining, namely through his fellow prisoners and his German captors. He was interviewed in a documentary titled "Stalag Luft III", produced by RDR Productions of Glenview, Illinois.

== Chicago ==
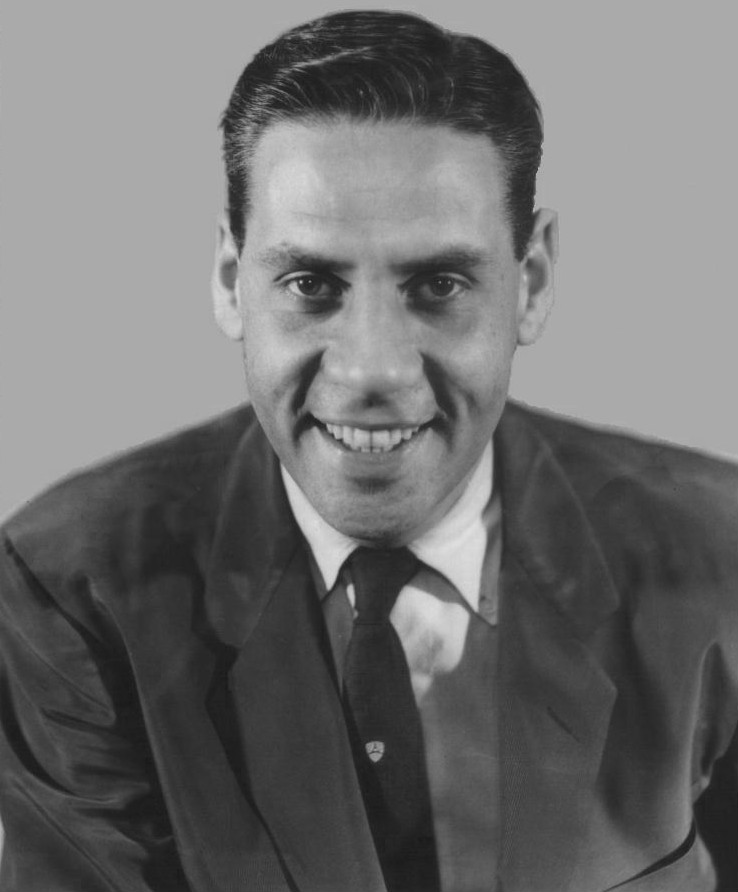
Rayner circa 1960

After briefly working in radio at WOOD in Grand Rapids, Michigan, as well as in New York and Dayton, Ohio following the war, Rayner joined what was then WBKB, later to become WBBM-TV in Chicago as a staff announcer; he also worked on a local morning program called Rayner Shine in 1953. This was Rayner's first work with puppets, who were provided for the show by the Mulqueens. He got a noontime program called The Ray Rayner Show in 1953, he and his co-host Mina Kolb hosted a somewhat free-form show that featured music, comedy skits, dance and pantomime. The show, geared towards teens, ran for five years.

WBBM asked Rayner to switch to a children's program in 1958, though reluctant at first, he did so with The Little Show, which was very much like Ray Rayner and His Friends; on this version, the duck he worked with had the name of Havelock. It ran two years; he also hosted Popeye's Firehouse (as Chief Abernathy) for another two. He moved to WGN-TV in 1961.

== WGN-TV Channel 9 ==
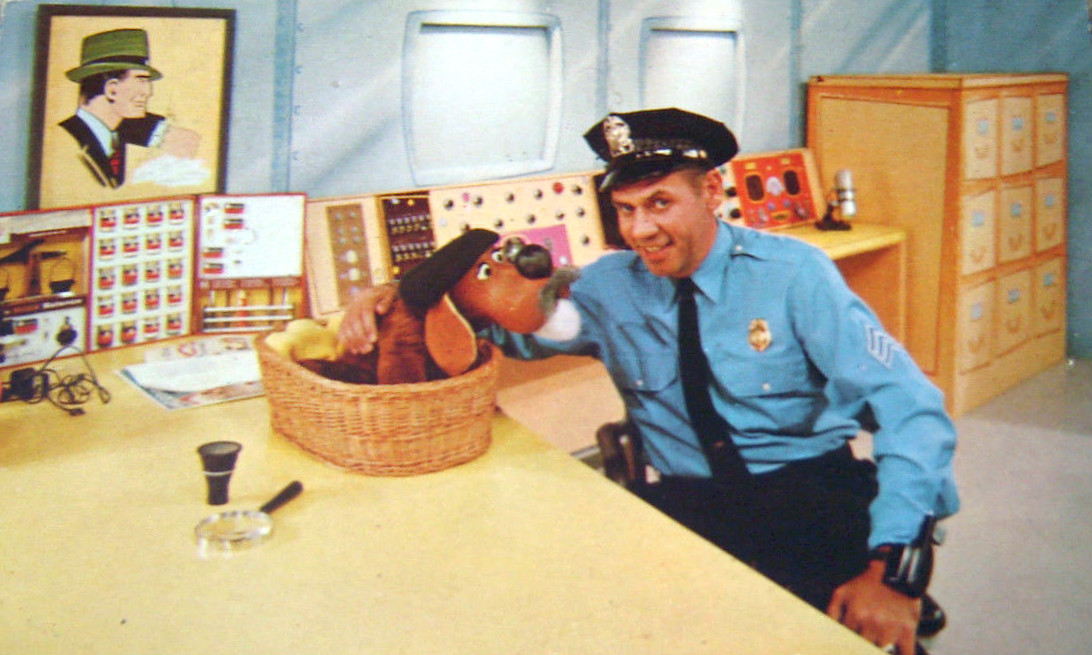
Rayner as Sergeant Pettibone, with Tracer puppet, circa 1961–1967

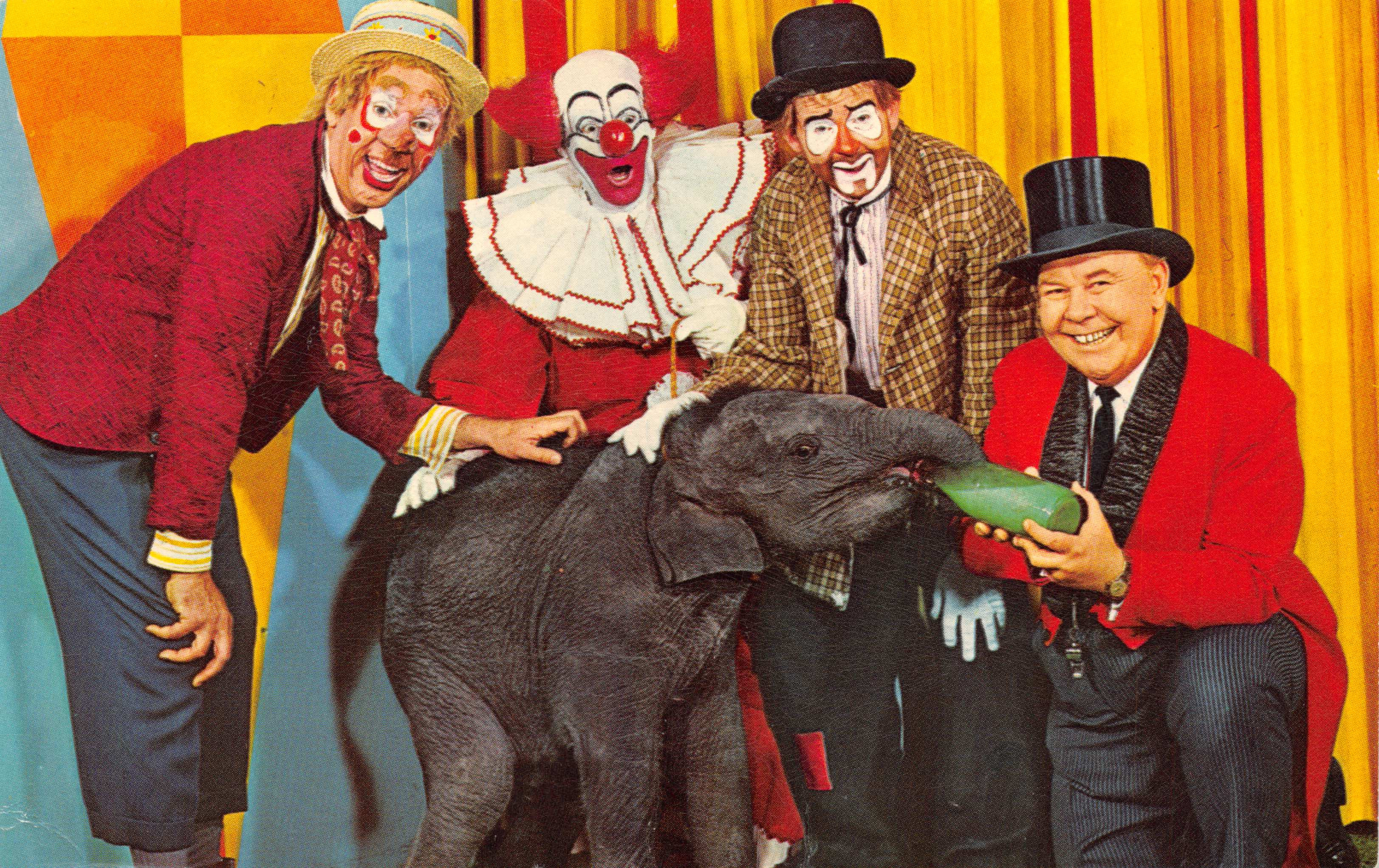
Rayner at left as Oliver O. Oliver on Bozo's Circus in 1966

His first role on WGN was as Sergeant Pettibone, the host of The Dick Tracy Show. He joined the cast of Bozo's Circus as country bumpkin clown Oliver O. Oliver. By 1965, Rayner's clown character, along with "Sandy", played by Don Sandburg, were added to Larry Harmon's Bozo coloring books. Rayner left the show in 1971 because he wanted more time for other projects. After that, he occasionally appeared on the show as Oliver and filled in for Ned Locke as "Mr. Ray" when needed. Following the cancellation of The Dick Tracy Show, a new afternoon program called Rocket to Adventure ran until 1968; this featured early appearances by Gigantor and Tobor the Eighth Man. Rayner hosted the show appearing as an astronaut. In 1968, he also appeared in television commercials for McDonald's as Ronald McDonald. At one point, WGN-TV had enough hope in being able to syndicate Rayner's scenes alongside The Dick Tracy Show to produce a pilot for that purpose.

=== Ray Rayner and His Friends ===
Starting in 1962, Rayner began hosting his own long-running Ray Rayner and His Friends, which had the title Breakfast With Bugs Bunny when he became its host; it was renamed in 1964. The show featured old cartoons such as various Warner Brothers character cartoons, arts-and-crafts, which often ended up as a gluey mess, and animals such as Chelveston the Duck who was named after RAF Chelveston where Rayner was stationed during World War II. Chelveston occasionally bit and Rayner was notably wary. During these segments, Chelveston walked around the set, ate, or bathed while a then-current top 40 song was played. Rayner later said he put duck feed in the cuffs of his coveralls so Chelveston nipped at them, then save himself from the duck by giving him a head of lettuce to pick apart. What was not known to the public until after the program was no longer on the air was that Chelveston was actually played by four different ducks over the years.

Rayner also had a talking dog puppet, Cuddly Dudley, created and voiced by Roy Brown, a.k.a. "Cooky the Cook" from Bozo's Circus and The Bozo Show. The segment highlighted viewer mail which included many hand-drawn pictures submitted by children. The segment was often humorous as it was a chance for Rayner and Brown to interact and use comedic ad-libs. He always wore a jumpsuit, covered with small pieces of paper that held reminders of what to do next on the program (a cartoon, a commercial, a visit from Chelveston, etc.). He would also simulcast traffic reports from sister station WGN Radio over stock footage of traffic moving along the Chicago-area Interstates. During baseball season, he showed and narrated highlights of the Cubs and White Sox games from the previous day, wearing a custom-sewn ball cap that had the front half of each team's cap, resulting in a two-billed cap which he spun around, depending on which team's highlights were being shown. Rayner would do the same thing for the Bears during football season.

The arts-and-crafts was a regular segment that always began with a finished version prepared in advance by someone "behind the scenes" (often the wife of Producer Dick Flanders) that was displayed to the audience, followed by Rayner's attempts to demonstrate the process in an amusing, all-thumbs effort, also set to music, that resulted in a comically sub-par facsimile that more resembled a random collection of felt, construction paper and glue. Rayner's version would then be displayed alongside the original further emphasizing his comical ineptitude regarding crafts. Rayner contended that his failure at crafts made the show successful as the work of his young viewers was much better than the crafts he did on-air. He held an annual jellybean contest where viewers were to submit guesses of the quantity in a large jar displayed for a period of time on the show. Every Christmas he had an Advent calendar and would reveal a date each day until the Christmas holiday. Another bit was a lip-synching sketch Rayner usually did to an older novelty song such as "Hello Muddah, Hello Fadduh" by Allan Sherman. However he also performed serious songs while actually singing. Another feature on the show was Ark in the Park, a taped segment of a trip to the Lincoln Park Zoo featuring the then-director of the zoo, Dr. Lester Fisher. The introductory music for this segment was "The Unicorn" by The Irish Rovers. Rayner also featured a "How and Why" segment on his shows with J. Bruce Mitchell of Chicago's Museum of Science and Industry, as did Garfield Goose and Friends. Along with Bozo's Circus, a video game was added to Rayner's show that viewers could play by phone called TV Powww. Rayner hosted this show until his 1980 retirement from WGN.

During his time at Channel 9, starting in 1974, Rayner also hosted a Thursday night broadcast of the Illinois State Lottery's then-weekly drawings, which featured a top prize of $300,000 ("Weekly Bonanza") and a second prize of $50,000 to a field of about a dozen contestants who had won a special lottery game over the preceding seven-day period. The show aired at 7:00 PM CT.

==== Cartoon segments ====
The cartoons on the program contain mostly Looney Tunes/Merrie Melodies cartoons from their Golden Age of American animation, including some syndicated cartoon and action segments such as Flash Gordon and Superman. After each cartoon, a view of a clock will display on-screen with a background drawing of a sun.

== Actor and author ==
During his years in Chicago, he also frequently appeared in live theater, including plays at the Forum Dinner Theater in suburban Summit; receiving a Jefferson award nomination for one of his roles. Rayner also did directing for student productions at Loyola University Chicago. He received an M. A. in Humanities from the University of Chicago in 1970, writing his thesis about children's television's first goal being to entertain. He was a member of the Silver Circle of the Chicago chapter of the National Academy of Television Arts and Sciences and received many local Emmys for his television work.

Rayner also wrote a book titled The Story of Television published in 1972. It is basically an industry guide to how a television show is made featuring many photos of Rayner from his Ray Rayner and Friends show. The book is quite rare and commands a high price, when available, from on-line auction sites. One copy was donated to the Museum of Broadcast Communications about seven months after Rayner's passing.

== Later years and legacy ==
He moved to KGGM-TV, the CBS affiliate in Albuquerque, New Mexico, in 1981, before retiring from television in 1989. He cited the harsh Chicago winters as the motivating factor. Rayner was the station's weatherman, complete with notes pinned to his jacket as they were to his coveralls in Chicago; he also hosted the local PM Magazine in Albuquerque. He returned to Chicago for the 25th and 30th anniversary shows for Bozo's Circus. Rayner continued to accept some Chicago theater roles and took some time to patiently answer children's questions about his work even after moving to Albuquerque. He did a week-long stint filling in at weather and other duties at Chicago's Fox Thing in the Morning on WFLD in May 1995. Rayner took some courses at the University of New Mexico, did some teaching and wrote a column for a local newspaper there.

Rayner moved to Fort Lauderdale, Florida, after his wife, Jeanne, a former nurse, died of lung cancer in 1995. His activities there included reading to the blind, Grant A Wish (for terminally ill children), and delivering Meals on Wheels.

He died on 21 January 2004, of complications from pneumonia in Fort Myers, Florida, at the age of 84. He is survived by his second wife, Marie, a daughter and a son, and four grandchildren.

Clips from Rayner's shows are featured in the WGN Christmas special, Bozo, Gar and Ray: WGN TV Classics. In 2005, the Museum of Broadcast Communications awarded WGN-TV's Studio 1 a plaque to commemorate the forty years of children's television broadcast from the studio. Ray Rayner and Friends with a likeness of Rayner and Chelveston, is on the plaque along with Frazier Thomas and Garfield Goose and Friends and Bob Bell and Bozo's Circus. Rayner's coveralls, complete with notes, is part of the museum's collection. Cuddly Dudley and his doghouse from The Bozo Show are also part of the museum's collection. A photo of Rayner on the set of his television show with two guests was chosen as the cover photo for Chicago Television, published for the Museum of Broadcast Communications in 2010.

== See also ==
- The Bozo Show

== Bibliography ==
- Hollis, Tim (2001). Hi There, Boys and Girls! America's Local Children's TV Programs. University Press of Mississippi. ISBN 978-1-578-06396-3. via Project MUSE (subscription required)
- Okuda, Ted; Mulqueen, Jack (2004). The Golden Age of Chicago Children's Television. Lake Claremont Press. ISBN 978-1-893-12117-1.
