= The Bozo Show =

Television series

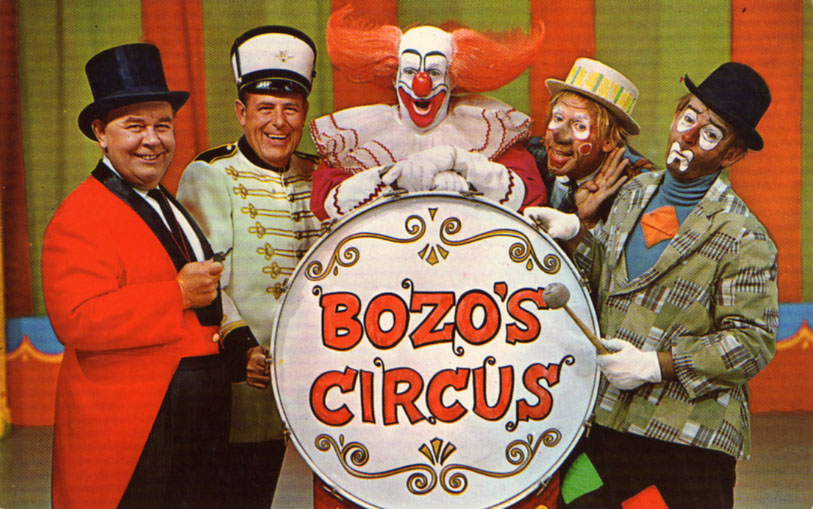
- Cast of Bozo's Circus, 1967. From left: Ringmaster Ned (Ned Locke), Mr. Bob (bandleader Bob Trendler), Bozo (Bob Bell), Oliver O. Oliver (Ray Rayner), Sandy (Don Sandburg)
- Based on: Bozo the Clown created by Alan W. Livingston
- Directed by: Ron Weiner
- Starring: Bozo the Clown
- Opening theme: "The Greatest Show on Earth" (closing theme from film)
- Ending theme: Various Circus Marches (1960s-1981; 1984-2001); Various Tom Fitzsimmons Arrangements (1981-1984)
- Country of origin: United States

Original release
- Network: WGN-TV
- Release: 20 June 1960 – 14 July 2001

The Bozo Show is a children's television program that aired on WGN-TV in Chicago and nationally on its superstation feed (now NewsNation) from 1960 to 2001. It was based on a children's record-book series, Bozo the Clown, by Capitol Records. The series was a locally produced version of the internationally franchised Bozo the Clown format and is the longest-running in the franchise. Recognized as the most popular and successful locally produced children's program in the history of television, it aired under this title for only 14 of its 40+ years: it also aired under the titles Bozo (1960–1961), Bozo's Circus (1961–1980), and The Bozo Super Sunday Show (1994–2001).

== History ==
=== 1960s ===
WGN-TV's first incarnation of the show was a live half-hour cartoon showcase titled Bozo, hosted by character actor and staff announcer Bob Bell in the title role performing comedy bits between cartoons, weekdays at noon for six-and-a-half months beginning on 20 June 1960. After a short hiatus to facilitate WGN-TV's move from Tribune Tower in downtown Chicago to a purpose-built studio facility on the city's northwest side, the show was relaunched in an expanded one-hour format as Bozo's Circus, which premiered at noon on 11 September 1961. The live show featured Bell as Bozo (although he did not perform on the first telecast), host Ned Locke as "Ringmaster Ned," a 13-piece orchestra, comedy sketches, circus acts, cartoons, games and prizes before a 200+ member studio audience. In the early months of the series, a respected English acrobatic clown, "Wimpey" (played by Bertram William Hiles) worked on the show, providing some legitimate circus background and performing opposite Bell's Bozo in comedy sketches. Hiles continued to make periodic guest appearances on the show into the mid-1960s.

In October 1961, Don Sandburg joined the show as producer and principal sketch writer, and also appeared as the mute clown "Sandy the Tramp," a character partly inspired by Harpo Marx. By November 1961, another eventual Chicago television legend joined the show's cast, actor Ray Rayner, as "Oliver O. Oliver," a country bumpkin from Puff Bluff, Kentucky. Rayner was hosting WGN-TV's Dick Tracy Show (which also premiered the same day as Bozo's Circus) and later replaced Dick Coughlan as host of Breakfast with Bugs Bunny, later retitled Ray Rayner and His Friends. WGN musical director Bob Trendler led the WGN Orchestra, dubbed the "Big Top Band."

Games on the show included the "Grand Prize Game" created by Sandburg, wherein a boy and girl were selected from the studio audience by the Magic Arrows (a set of arrows that flashed on the screen as the camera panned rapidly through the audience), and later the Bozoputer (a random number generator),. The player attempted to toss ping-pong balls into six numbered buckets in sequence, each set farther away than the one before it, and won a prize of increasing value for each one hit. The game ended when the player either missed a bucket or hit all six of them; in the latter case, he/she won a cash bonus, a bicycle, and (in later years) a trip. Any player who missed the first bucket was allowed to keep trying until he/she hit it and won that prize. Before each game, a postcard was drawn at random from those sent in by home viewers, and the chosen viewer received a duplicate of every prize won by the player. For many years, the cash bonus for hitting the sixth bucket was a progressive jackpot that grew by $1 each day until it was won. It was later changed to a constant $50, and subsequently increased to $100. The Grand Prize Game became so popular that Larry Harmon, who purchased the rights to the Bozo character, later adapted it for other Bozo shows (as "Bozo Buckets" to some and "Bucket Bonanza" to others) and also licensed home and coin-operated versions.

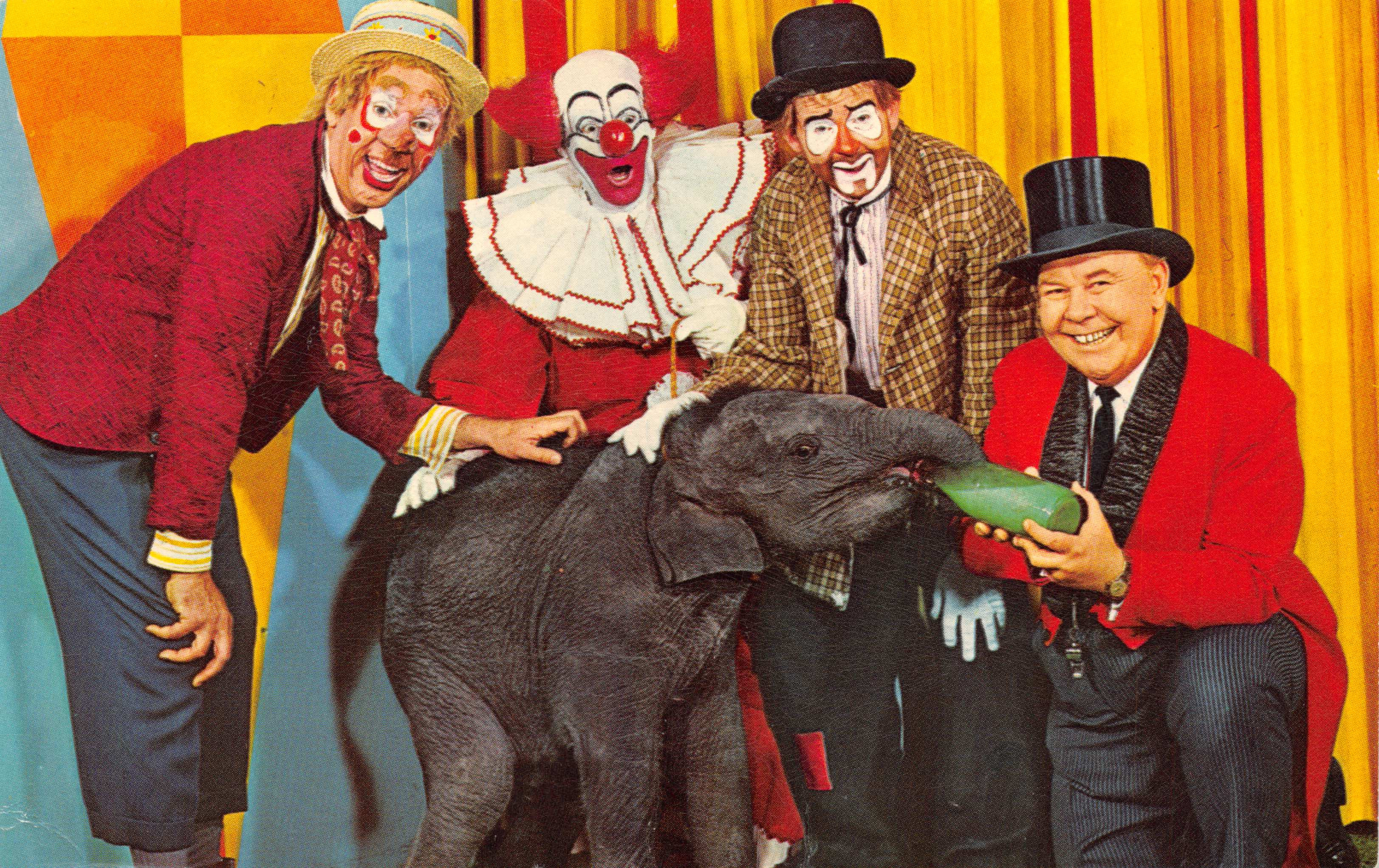
The cast in 1963

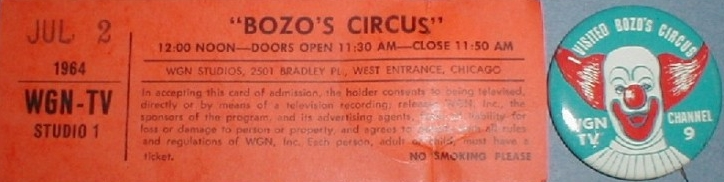
Unused ticket and pin for Bozo's Circus, 1964

By 1963, the show welcomed its 100,000th visitor and reached the 250,000 mark in 1966. The show was so popular locally, that seven hours after the Chicago Blizzard of 1967 began, there were 193 people standing in line, waiting to use their Bozo show tickets; it was one of the few times the live show was canceled and the tape of an older show was run instead.

In October 1968, Bell was hospitalized for a brain aneurysm and was absent from the show for several months. Meanwhile, Sandburg resolved to leave the show for the West Coast but stayed longer while Bell recuperated. To pick up the slack, WGN-TV floor manager Richard Shiloh Lubbers appeared as "Monty Melvin," named after a schoolmate of Sandburg's, while WGN Garfield Goose and Friends and Ray Rayner and His Friends puppeteer Roy Brown created a new character, "Cooky the Cook." Sandburg left the show in January 1969 and Bell returned in March. Lubbers left as well with Brown staying on as a permanent cast member. Magician Marshall Brodien, who had been making semi-regular guest appearances in which he frequently interacted with the clowns, also began appearing as a wizard character in an Arabian Nights-inspired costume in 1968 and by the early 1970s evolved into "Wizzo the Wizard." From the beginning of the show until 1970, Bozo appeared in a red costume; Larry Harmon, owner of the character's license, insisted Bozo wear blue. Harmon did not have his way regarding the costume's color in Chicago until after Don Sandburg, who was also the show's producer, left for California.

A prime-time version titled Big Top was seen September through January on Wednesday nights in 1965 through 1967.

=== 1970s ===
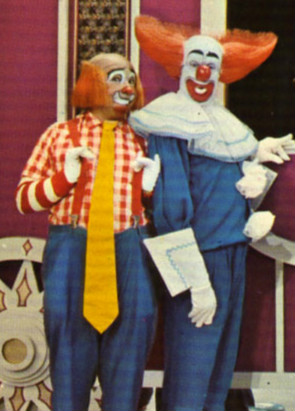
Cooky the Cook with Bozo, 1976

Bozo and Wizzo, 1978

Ray Rayner left Bozo's Circus in 1971 and was briefly replaced by actor Pat Tobin as Oliver's cousin "Elrod T. Potter" and then by magician John Thompson (an acquaintance of Roy Brown's and Marshall Brodien's) as "Clod Hopper." (Tobin previously had played Bozo on KSOO-TV in Sioux Falls, South Dakota. Thompson has appeared on A&E's Criss Angel Mindfreak.) Rayner periodically returned to guest-host as himself in his morning show's jumpsuit as "Mr. Ray" when Ned Locke was absent. The show had its 500,000th visitor in the same year. By 1973, WGN gave up on Thompson and increased Brodien's appearances as Wizzo. That same year, the National Association of Broadcasters issued an edict forbidding the practice of children's TV show hosts doubling as pitchmen for products. This resulted in major cutbacks to children's show production budgets. In 1975, Bob Trendler retired from television and his Big Top Band was reduced to a three-piece band led by Tom Fitzsimmons. Locke also retired from television in 1976 and was replaced by Frazier Thomas, host of WGN's Family Classics and Garfield Goose and Friends, at which point Garfield Goose and Friends ended its 24-year run on Chicago television with the puppets moving to a segment on Bozo's Circus. As the storyline went, Gar "bought" Bozo's Circus from the retiring Ringmaster Ned and appointed "Prime Minister" Thomas as the new Circus Manager. In 1978 when WGN-TV became a national superstation on cable and satellite through what eventually became WGN America, the show gained more of a national following. In 1979, Bozo's Circus added "TV Powww!", where those at home could play a video game by phone.

=== 1980s ===
By 1980, Chicago's public schools stopped allowing students to go home for lunch and Ray Rayner announced his imminent retirement from his morning show and Chicago television. The show stopped issuing tickets; the wait to be part of the audience was eight years long. Beginning a summer hiatus and airing taped shows the next year pushed the wait back to ten years. On 11 August 1980, Bozo’s Circus was renamed The Bozo Show and moved to weekdays at 8:00 a.m., on tape, immediately following Ray Rayner and His Friends. On 26 January 1981, The Bozo Show replaced Ray Rayner and His Friends at 7:00 a.m. The program expanded to 90 minutes, the circus acts and Garfield Goose and Friends puppets were dropped, and Cuddly Dudley (a puppet on Ray Rayner and His Friends voiced and operated by Roy Brown) and more cartoons were added. In 1983, Pat Hurley from ABC-TV's Kids Are People Too joined the cast as himself, interviewing kids in the studio audience and periodically participating in sketches.

The biggest change occurred in 1984 with the retirement of Bob Bell, with the show still the most-watched in its timeslot and a ten-year wait for studio audience reservations. After a nationwide search, Bell was replaced by actor Joey D'Auria, who would play the role of Bozo for the next 17 years.

In 1985, Frazier Thomas died and Hurley filled in as host for the final six shows that season, stepping into a semi-authority character. In 1987, Hurley was dropped and the show's timeslot returned to 60 minutes. In 1987, a synthesizer, played by "Professor Andy" (actor Andy Mitran), replaced the three-piece Big Top Band.

=== 1990s ===
Roy Brown began suffering heart-related problems and was absent from the show for an extended period during the 1991–92 season. This coincided with the show's 30th anniversary and a reunion special that included Don Sandburg as Sandy, who also filled in for Cooky for the first two weeks that season. Actor Adrian Zmed (best known from ABC-TV's T.J. Hooker), who was a childhood fan of Bozo's Circus and former Grand Prize Game contestant, also appeared on the special and portrayed himself as a "Rookie Clown" for the following two weeks. Actor Michael Immel then joined the show as "Spiffy" (Spifford Q. Fahrquahrrr). Brown returned in January 1992, initially on a part-time basis but suffered additional health setbacks and took another extended leave of absence in the fall of 1993. Brown's presence on the show remained, though, as previously aired segments as Cooky and Cuddly Dudley were incorporated until 1994, when he and Marshall Brodien retired from television.

Later that year, WGN management, due to the high cost of producing a daily television program, plus the rising competition from dedicated children's television networks, decided to get out of the weekday children's television business and buried The Bozo Show in an early Sunday timeslot as The Bozo Super Sunday Show on 11 September 1994; WGN's decision to relegate the program to Sundays coincided with the launch of the WGN Morning News (which debuted five days earlier), a weekday morning newscast that originally launched as an hour-long program (the move of Bozo effectively resulted in the cancellation of the station's then two-year-old Sunday morning newscast, whose 8 a.m. timeslot Bozo took over). Immel was replaced by Robin Eurich as "Rusty the Handyman," Michele Gregory as "Tunia" and Cathy Schenkelberg as "Pepper." (Shenkelberg was dropped in 1996.)

The show suffered another blow in 1997, when its format became educational following a Federal Communications Commission mandate requiring broadcast television stations to air a minimum three hours of educational children's programs per week. (Note: Syndicated programs helped further WGN's fulfillment of the requirements. Although a WB affiliate at the time, the station had passed over Kids' WB (which reserved a half-hour of its weekend lineup to compliant educational content) to independent station WCIU-TV from the block's September 1995 launch until January 2004.) In 1998, Michele Gregory left the cast following more budget cuts.

=== 2000s ===
In 2001, station management controversially ended production citing increased competition from newer children's cable channels. The final taping, a 90-minute primetime special titled Bozo: 40 Years of Fun!, was taped on 12 June 2001 and aired 14 July 2001. By this time, it was the only Bozo show that remained on television. The special featured Joey D'Auria as Bozo, Robin Eurich as Rusty, Andy Mitran as Professor Andy, Marshall Brodien as Wizzo and Don Sandburg as Sandy. Also present at the last show were Billy Corgan of The Smashing Pumpkins, who performed, and Bob Bell's family. Many of the costumes and props are on display at The Museum of Broadcast Communications. Reruns of The Bozo Super Sunday Show aired until 26 August 2001. Bozo returned to television on 24 December 2005 in a two-hour retrospective titled Bozo, Gar & Ray: WGN TV Classics. The primetime premiere was #1 in the Chicago market and continues to be rebroadcast and streamed live online annually during the holiday season.

Bozo also returned to Chicago's parade scene and the WGN-TV float in 2008 as the station celebrated its 60th anniversary. He also appeared in a 2008 public service announcement alerting WGN-TV analog viewers about the upcoming switch to digital television. Bozo was played by WGN-TV staff member George Pappas. Since then, Bozo continues to appear annually in Chicago's biggest parades.

=== 2010s ===
Few episodes from the show's first two decades survive; although some were recorded to videotape for delayed broadcasts, the tapes were reused and eventually discarded. In 2012, a vintage tape was located on the Walter J. Brown Media Archives & Peabody Awards Collection website archive list by Rick Klein of The Museum of Classic Chicago Television, containing material from two 1971 episodes. WGN reacquired the tape and put together a new special entitled Bozo's Circus: The Lost Tape, which aired in December 2012. Klein maintains a substantial number of Bozo tapes in his museum; WGN initially prevented Klein from sharing the tapes on the museum's YouTube page but later dropped its objection, recognizing the importance of preserving the content.

On 6 October 2018, Don Sandburg, Bozo's Circus producer, writer and the last surviving original cast member, died at the age of 87. Four months later, WGN-TV paid tribute to Sandburg and the rest of the original cast with a two-hour special titled Bozo's Circus: The 1960s.

== Characters ==
Character	Actor	Years
Bozo	Bob Bell ^	1960–1984
Oliver O. Oliver	Ray Rayner ^	1961–1971
Sandy	Don Sandburg ^	1961–1969
Ringmaster Ned	Ned Locke ^	1961–1976
Mr. Bob	Bob Trendler	1961–1975
Cooky	Roy Brown ^	1968–1994
Wizzo	Marshall Brodien ^	1968–1994
Elrod T. Potter	Pat Tobin	1971–1972
Clod Hopper	John Thompson	1972–1973
Frazier Thomas	Himself	1976–1985
Pat Hurley	Himself	1983–1987
Bozo	Joey D'Auria ^	1984–2001
Professor Andy	Andy Mitran ^	1987–2001
Spiffy	Michael Immel	1991–1994
Rusty	Robin Eurich ^	1994–2001
Pepper	Cathy Schenkelberg	1994–1996
Tunia	Michele Gregory	1994–1998

^ Costume part of the Museum of Broadcast Communications' Bozo's Circus collection.

== See also ==
- Krusty the Clown, a fictional character based in part on The Bozo Show

== Bibliography ==
- Okuda, Ted; Mulqueen, Jack (2004). The Golden Age of Chicago Children's Television. Lake Claremont Press. ISBN 978-1-893-12117-1.
