= Roy Brown (clown) =

American TV personality, puppeteer and clown (1932–2001)

- Brown at WGN-TV in 1966.
- Born: 8 July 1932; Tucson, Arizona
- Died: 22 January 2001 (aged 68); Chicago, Illinois
- Occupations: Graphic artist, puppeteer, clown
- Known for: Cooky the Cook; Bozo's Circus; Garfield Goose and Friends; Ray Rayner and His Friends

Roy Thomas Brown (8 July 1932 – 22 January 2001) was an American television personality, puppeteer, clown and artist known for playing "Cooky the Cook" (also Cooky the Clown) on Chicago's Bozo's Circus.

== Early years ==
Roy Brown was born in Tucson, Arizona but had lived in the Chicago area since he was a boy. His mother was an artist with an at-home studio, which gave him the opportunity to also become interested in art. Brown graduated from Chicago's Austin High School; when he entered the Chicago Academy of Fine Arts, Brown intended to become a cartoonist. He started working on the children's series Garfield Goose and Friends at WBKB-TV in 1952 as a puppeteer and art director. When Garfield Goose moved to WGN-TV in 1955, Brown followed along and stayed until the show went off the air in 1976.

== Behind the scenes work ==
When Frazier Thomas hired Brown for Garfield Goose and Friend in 1952, Brown was still an art student and had no prior experience as a puppeteer. Brown's talent for this work was quickly evident. In a later interview, he talked about his many years of work with Thomas on the show, saying that while Thomas was a perfectionist, he was very willing to grant Brown the freedom to be creative with the program's puppet characters. Brown developed a movement with his hand that would make Garfield Goose appear to smile. He also created greeting cards for the program which were sent to young viewers in response to their letters, the title cards for the show, and created illustrations of Garfield Goose's travels away from his castle.

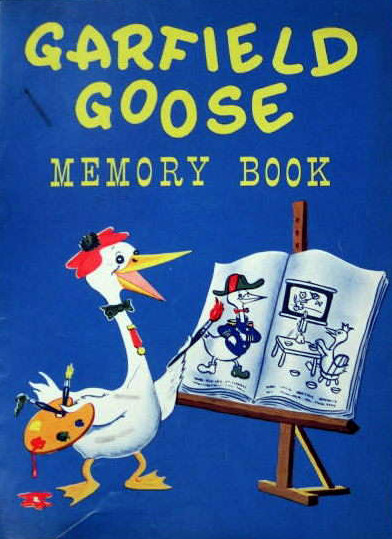
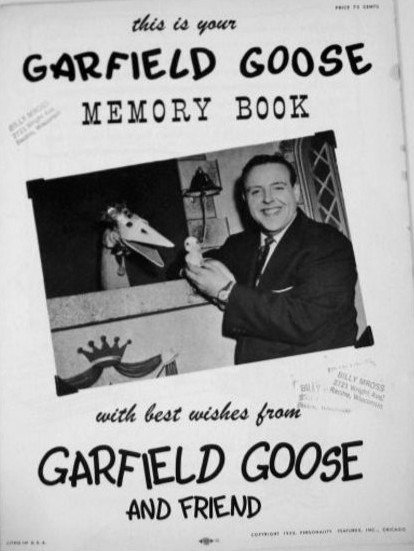

By 1953, the program was popular enough for Thomas to write a book about the character, Garfield Goose Memory Book, detailing his family, years of growing up and his average day as King of the United States in his castle. Brown contributed the illustrations for the 32-page booklet, which was also able to be used as a coloring book.

Brown's first puppet contribution to the show made his debut on Christmas Day, 1953. Christmas Goose, the nephew of Garfield, was the first puppet cast member outside of Garfield Goose. A capuchin monkey named Geronimo had joined the cast on Thanksgiving Day as a butler. During the time he was working on the Garfield Goose show, Brown also created puppets and performed them for another WGN-TV children's show called Quiet Riot. One of Brown's creations for this show was a rabbit named Romberg; when Quiet Riot was cancelled, Brown brought Romberg Rabbit to Frazier Thomas, who liked the puppet so much, he asked Brown to make him part of the Garfield Goose cast.

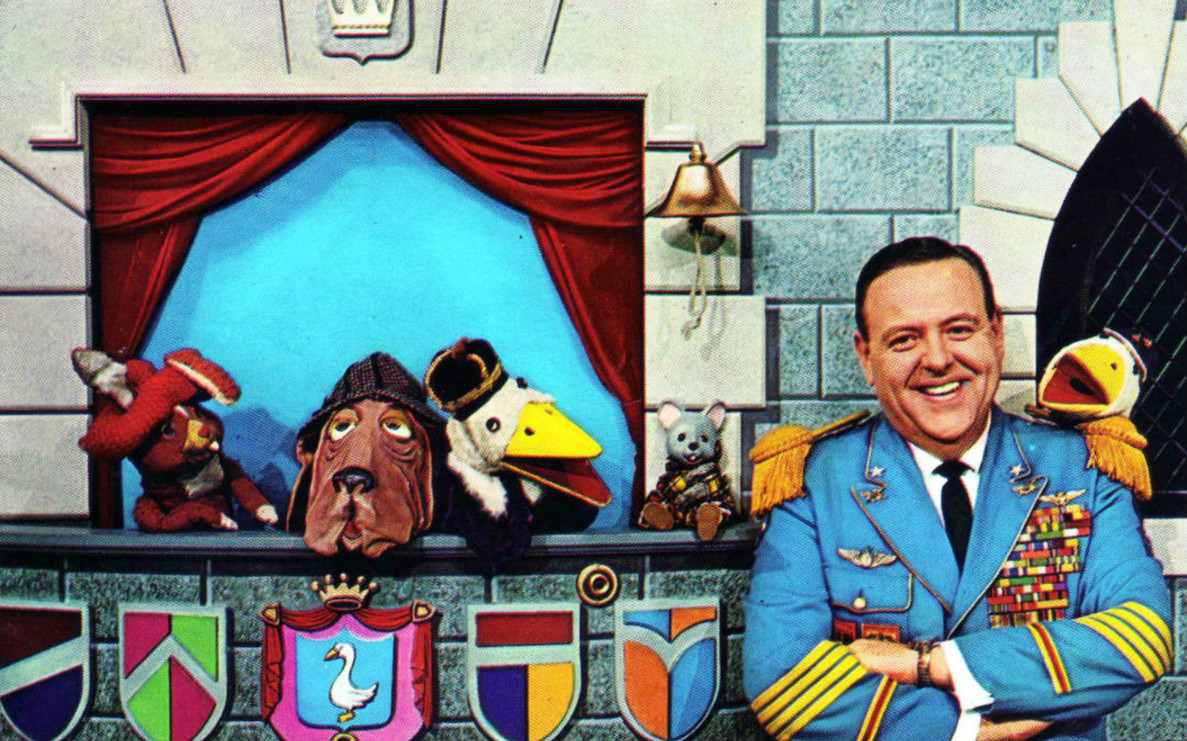
Brown created all of the puppet characters shown here with Frazier Thomas and Garfield Goose: Romberg Rabbit, Beauregard Burnside III, Mackintosh Mouse, and Chris Goose.

The show was originally called Garfield Goose and Friend, as it started out with just Thomas and his goose puppet. Because the cast of characters had grown, Thomas decided to change the name of his program to Garfield Goose and Friends with the addition of Romberg Rabbit. Brown's next creation for the program was a sleepy bloodhound called Beauregard Burnside III, who came to full attention when "hotdogs, hamburgers, spaghetti and meatballs" was said into his ear. Macintosh Mouse came to the show to work in the castle mailroom.

In 1961, Thomas began hosting a weekly series called Family Classics where he served as the host, introducing classic movies which were suitable for family viewing. Brown was also the art director for this program, taking Thomas' designs for the set and turning them into a warm study, complete with a Brown oil painting of Garfield Goose. The portrait and set are part of the exhibits at the Museum of Broadcast Communications.

When Ray Rayner started his programs Ray Rayner and His Friends and the Dick Tracy Show on WGN-TV, Brown was hired as art director, creating a dog puppet called Tracer for the Tracy show. He also did puppetry on Rayner's morning show for a character called Cuddly Dudley, a large, orange dog created by WGN-TV's owner, the Chicago Tribune, as a promotional item. The Cuddly Dudley puppet and his dog house are now part of the Museum of Broadcast Communication's collection. He stayed on the Rayner show until it went off the air in 1981. When Rayner joined the "Bozo's Circus" cast as country clown Oliver O. Oliver, Brown designed and built the noses for the character. Among Brown's other creations were puppets for other WGN television shows, such as The Blue Fairy, Treetop House, and Paddleboat, which starred a pre-Bozo's Circus Ned Locke.

== On-camera performer ==
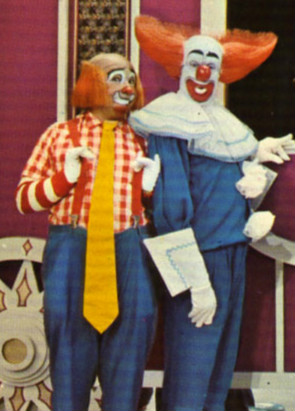
Roy Brown as Cooky the Cook with Bozo (Bob Bell), on Bozo's Circus, 1976.

It was on Bozo's Circus, however, that Brown had his chance to shine in front of the camera as a performer. When show producer Don Sandburg, who doubled as a clown called Sandy the Tramp, announced in 1968 he would leave the show, Brown took one of Bozo's old red wigs, trimmed and restyled it and cobbled together some other props and wardrobe. Before he found the right makeup for Cooky, Brown had made 60 other tries with it for his character. Told by Sandburg that if he wanted to become Sandy's replacement on the show, he would need to appear without any other preparation, Brown did his audition live on the air as the circus cook, Cooky. Brown, who had no previous on-camera experience, created the Cooky character as an initial tongue-in-cheek reference to the food at the station's cafeteria. Brown also performed Cuddly Dudley in new segments with Bozo.

The viewer reaction was positive, but Brown was not the only person who wanted to replace Sandy. Dick Lubbers, a WGN-TV floor manager, also auditioned for the role as Monty Melvin. Until Lubbers left the station about a year later, Brown and Lubbers appeared on the show on alternating days. Lubbers' leaving meant the job finally belonged to Roy Brown. When Rayner, who also starred as Oliver O. Oliver on Bozo's Circus, left the show in 1971, Cooky became Bozo's main foil until his retirement in 1994. Fellow cast member Marshall Brodien, who played Wizzo the Wizard on the show, teamed up with Brown in 1973 for an act they brought to the Kane County and DuPage County fairs each summer for twenty-one years. Brodien also retired from the program in 1994.

The tradition on Bozo's Circus from its start was that at the end of the program, Bozo would lead the audience out of the television studio in a Grand March, complete with baton and music. In 1987, a viewer petition gathered 10,000 names for Brown's Cooky character to lead the Grand March, and Brown was given the honors for a day. Although Brown's Cooky outlasted Bob Bell's 24 years as Bozo by a year, Cooky's appearances during his final year were from previous shows due to health problems. (Joey D'Auria replaced Bell as Bozo after retirement until the show ended in 2001.)

== Legacy ==
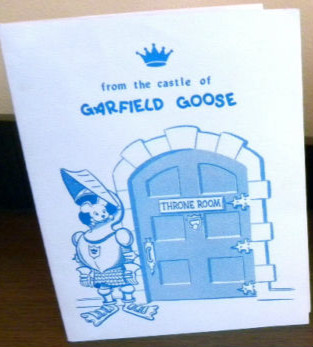
Roy Brown created items like this greeting card for young viewers.

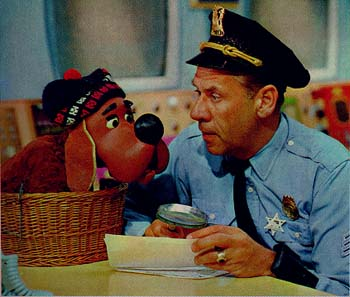
Ray Rayner as Sergeant Pettibone, with Brown's Tracer puppet, 1966.

Brown won a Chicago/Midwest Emmy Award in 1992. He was elected into the International Clown Hall of Fame the next year; it was not until three years later that his colleague, Bob Bell, joined him. Roy also became a member of the Chicago chapter of the National Academy of Television Arts and Sciences Silver Circle in 1993. His health forced Brown to retire in 1994. Upon his retirement, he donated some of his costumes and clown-related material to the International Clown Hall of Fame. Brown was able to be a part of the 35th anniversary Bozo's Circus program in 1996 and also to take part in "An Evening With Roy Brown", presented by the Museum of Broadcast Communications. Brown made his final appearance on the show on 26 August 2000. He died in 2001 of congestive heart failure. He was survived by his second wife, Mary Lu, four sons, three stepsons, and three step-grandchildren. His interment was at Memory Gardens Cemetery in Arlington Heights, Illinois. One of Brown's Cooky costumes is part of the collection of the Museum of Broadcast Communications' Bozo's Circus collection. The cast of characters that he created for Garfield Goose and Friends are also in the museum.

In 2005, the Museum of Broadcast Communications awarded WGN-TV's Studio 1 a plaque to commemorate the forty years of children's television broadcast from the studio. Garfield Goose and Friends is on the plaque along with Ray Rayner and Friends and Bozo's Circus. Roy Brown was an important part of all three of the shows; his work delighted three generations of young Chicagoans.

== Bibliography ==
- Hollis, Tim (2001). Hi There, Boys and Girls! America's Local Children's TV Programs. University Press of Mississippi. ISBN 978-1-578-06396-3. via Project MUSE (subscription required)
- Okuda, Ted; Mulqueen, Jack (2004). The Golden Age of Chicago Children's Television. Lake Claremont Press. ISBN 978-1-893-12117-1.
