= Bob Bell (actor) =

American actor (1922–1997)

- Bell on the Bozo's Circus set at WGN-TV before getting into character, c. 1960s
- Born: Robert Lewis Bell; January 18, 1922; Flint, Michigan, U.S.
- Died: December 8, 1997 (aged 75); Lake San Marcos, California, U.S.
- Occupations: Actor; announcer
- Years active: 1953–1997
- Known for: Bozo the Clown; Andy Starr
- Spouse: Carol Atkinson (m. 1947)
- Children: 4
- Relatives: Trevor Bell (grandson)

Robert Lewis Bell (January 18, 1922 – December 8, 1997) was an American actor and announcer famous for his alter-ego, Bozo the Clown. He was the original portrayer of the character for Chicago superstation WGN-TV.

== Early life ==
Bell was born in Flint, Michigan, to a General Motors factory worker. He spent his life after high school doing odd jobs until he enlisted first in the U.S. Marine Corps and later in the U.S. Navy during World War II, though he did not see any combat action due to the loss of vision in his right eye. Bell was able to pass the induction examination for the Marines by memorizing eye charts. He had a medical discharge from the Marines less than a year after joining in 1941. Bell then went to the navy, where he served in the Pacific Theater until 1946. Before the Marines, Bell worked in movies, taking minor roles and in set construction. Bell was also a baseball player during his Flint high school years, but was limited due to his vision loss. Bell's father, George M. Bell, played minor league baseball in the early part of the 20th century.

He broke into broadcasting in Flint as an announcer at local station WMRP (now WWCK), then left for South Bend, Indiana station WHOT. He met his future wife Carolyn while working there. He moved into television with Indianapolis station WFBM-TV (now WRTV) in 1950.

== Cincinnati and Chicago ==
Bell moved on to Cincinnati, Ohio, and WLW Radio and WLWT-TV in 1953. He joined the cast of the Wally Phillips Show and proved to have a gift for comedy, playing numerous characters. After WLW and WLWT's executive vice president took a position with Chicago broadcast giants WGN Radio and WGN-TV in 1956, Bell, Phillips and the show's writer/director/producer Don Sandburg came along, producing their own variety series, which included The Wally Phillips Show and Midnight Ticker.

== "Bozo's Circus is on the air!" ==
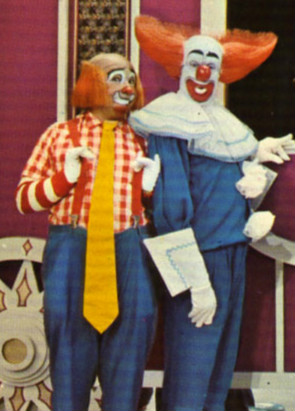
Bob Bell as Bozo with Cooky the Clown (Roy Brown), on Bozo's Circus, 1976

In 1960, station management asked the character actor and staff announcer to portray Bozo on a live, 30-minute show weekdays at noon, consisting of one-man sketches and cartoons, which debuted on June 20, 1960. The show went on hiatus in January 1961 to move from studios at Tribune Tower to new studios at 2501 West Bradley Place, near the Lane Tech High School campus. Thus, Bozo evolved into Bozo's Circus on September 11, 1961, as a live, hour-long telecast. At the same time Bell was hosting WGN's after school Three Stooges show from 1959 where he played an old man named Andy Starr who ran a neighborhood theatre called the Odeon where he showed the Stooges shorts. The show ran for nine years with Bell as the host and also as Bozo.

In 1968, surgery for a brain aneurysm and needed recuperation forced Bell to take a leave of absence from the show. He was able to participate in some broadcasts via telephone, returning to the show again in March 1969. In 1970, Bell received his first Emmy for WGN-TV's Bozo's Circus. He was also the Grand Marshal for Chicago's Christmas Parade in the same year; the number of people who turned out for the parade was estimated at 500,000.

== After Bozo ==
Bell retired from WGN-TV and The Bozo Show in 1984, and was inducted into the International Clown Hall of Fame in 1996. Larry Harmon, who owned the rights to the Bozo the Clown character, refused to congratulate Bell on the honor and also prohibited him from receiving it in costume, as was customary at inductions.

He spent his last years in Lake San Marcos, California, where he was active in the Kiwanis club. Upon his death, he was cremated, and his ashes were scattered at sea. A memorial was held for him at the First Presbyterian Church of Deerfield, where he lived during his many years in Chicago. Bell received many posthumous honors: both the City of Chicago and the State of Illinois proclaimed April 18, 1998, "Bob Bell Day" as the section of Addison Street near the WGN-TV studios was named "Bob Bell Way". In 2005, the Museum of Broadcast Communications awarded WGN-TV's Studio 1 a plaque to commemorate the forty years of children's television broadcast from the studio. Ray Rayner and Friends with a likeness of Rayner and Chelveston, is on the plaque along with Frazier Thomas and Garfield Goose and Friends and Bob Bell as Bozo the Clown for Bozo's Circus. In 2008, he was inducted into the Chicago chapter of the National Academy for Television Arts and Sciences' Silver Circle. One of Bell's Bozo costumes is part of the Bozo's Circus collection of the Museum of Broadcast Communications.

Bell's grandson, Trevor Bell, became a member of the Major League Baseball team Los Angeles Angels of Anaheim in 2005.

Bell’s voice was the inspiration for the voice of The Simpsons character Krusty the Clown.

== Bibliography ==
- Hollis, Tim (2001). Hi There, Boys and Girls! America's Local Children's TV Programs. University Press of Mississippi. ISBN 978-1-57806-396-3. via Project MUSE (subscription required)
- Okuda, Ted; Mulqueen, Jack (2004). The Golden Age of Chicago Children's Television. Lake Claremont Press. ISBN 978-1-893121-17-1.
