= Cuddly Dudley =

Cocker spaniel toy and TV character

Cuddly Dudley as seen on WGN-TV's Ray Rayner and His Friends.

Cuddly Dudley is a lifesize (at 28.5 inch tall) shiny plush stuffed animal Cocker Spaniel doll that was used as a subscription sales promotional item by the Chicago Tribune in the mid-1960s. In addition, the animal took on a life of its own as a recurring puppet character on Chicago children's TV for many years.

== Promotional gimmick ==
Cuddly Dudley was an idea Jerry Glasspiegel came up within the middle of the night when he was thinking of a good promotion idea for his customer, The Chicago Tribune. Francis A. Schumacher, the then-home circulation supervisor for the Chicago Tribune, helped start the Cuddly Dudley promotion program. As part of the program, home subscribers received a stuffed dog for subscribing. The idea was very similar to Disney or McDonald's, in that the hope was that the kids would pester the parents for the animal, effectively shilling for the paper. As part of the scheme a 1967 Sunday paper, the newspaper's largest issue of the week, included a cut and fold insert encouraging kids to "save" Dudley from the "runaway Christmas train." Vintage dolls with the original box, which converts into Dudley's cardboard car, get up to $200 at auction.

== On television ==
Roy Brown, a fixture on WGN's kid vid for decades, subsequently retrofitted the plush animal as a working puppet. He performed as the voice and puppeteer behind Cuddly for many years on "Ray Rayner and Friends", a classic morning show on WGN, which was also owned by the Chicago Tribune. The segment appeared weekly on Fridays near the end of the show, for the last 10–15 minutes. Ray would begin singing "The Cuddly Dudley Song" (to the music of "The Whistler and His Dog" by Arthur Pryor) and walk over to Cuddly's doghouse. Dudley would proceed to read jokes and display artwork submitted by local Chicago children. The big draw was getting one's name mentioned on air, as Dudley would always namedrop each submitter's name before the joke/artwork was read/ shown. Knock-knock jokes were a recurring theme. Ray would give a wonderful forced laugh after each joke. There were always adult ad-libs between Brown and Rayner, and Roy Brown often would get Ray to crack up if he was feeling particularly silly that morning. Cuddly Dudley also appeared on the Bozo the Clown show. The puppet and his doghouse are part of the collection of the Museum of Broadcast Communications.

=== Theme song ===
As Rayner began the segment he would sing the following song. Music by Arthur Pryor. Lyrics by an unknown source.

We're off to Cuddly Dudley's house he's cute as he can be. With his fur of gold and his nose so cold he's cuddly as can be. He's got riddles and jokes and the fun that he pokes is never aimed at me. Here's the place that he lives and the name that he gives is Cuddly.

== Other meanings ==
In addition, Cuddly Dudley was Britain's first black Rock and Roller; Cuddly Duddly was a nickname given to actor Dudley Moore. Further, the Chicago Cubs has been referred to as Cuddly Duddly clones.
