= Lester E. Fisher =

American zoologist (1921–2021)

Lester E. Fisher (February 24, 1921 – December 22, 2021) was an American zoologist who studied apes and other animals. He began his career in 1947 when hired part-time as Lincoln Park Zoo's first veterinarian. He became affectionately known as Chicago's Dr. Doolittle and Mr. Chimps.

== Early life ==
Fisher received his doctorate in veterinary medicine from Iowa State University in 1943. Then, Fisher served in World War II in Europe as a veterinarian for Gen. George S. Patton's bull terrier, Willie.

== Career ==
From 1947 to 1962, he also had a private veterinary practice in Berwyn. In 1962, Marlin Perkins left as director of Lincoln Park Zoo for St. Louis. Fisher succeeded him as the zoo's director. He continued in that role until his retirement in 1992. Fisher was then Director Emeritus for the zoo until his death.

== Television and movie appearances ==
Fisher appeared in the documentaries Arctic Window (1985), Otto: Zoo Gorilla, and Zookeepers. He frequently appeared on Chicago area television shows to promote the Lincoln Park Zoo, animals cared for by the zoo, and conservation topics. Shows on which he regularly appeared include Zoo Parade, The Ray Rayner Show, in a segment called "Ark in the Park", and Bozo`s Circus. One of his later television appearances was in an episode of Pritzker Military Presents entitled Soldier's Best Friends: Animals in the Military which aired on WYCC.

== Legacy and awards ==
Fisher received the R. Marlin Perkins Award in 1996, which is the highest award given by the American Zoo and Aquarium Association.

Lincoln Park Zoo has named the Lester E. Fisher Center for the Study and Conservation of Apes after Fisher.

Fisher's time at Lincoln Park Zoo is the subject of his memoir, written with Betty White, entitled Dr. Fisher's Life on the Ark: Green Alligators, Bushman, and Other Hare-raising Tales from America's Most Popular Zoo and Around the World, which was published in 2004.

== Personal life and death ==
Fisher lived in Hayward, Wisconsin. He turned 100 on February 24, 2021, and died on December 22.
