= The Museum of Classic Chicago Television =

Online museum of Chicago television broadcasts

- Established: 2007; 19 years ago
- Location: Chicago, Illinois
- Type: Nonprofit
- Founder: Rick Klein
- Website: www.FuzzyMemories.Tv www.Fuzzy.Tv

The Museum of Classic Chicago Television (also known as FuzzyMemoriesTV) is an online museum dedicated to the preservation of Chicago television broadcasts.

== Collection ==
Most of the museum's footage originates from "airchecks" of local Chicago channels (and to a lesser extent other cities) that were recorded primarily in the 1970s and 1980s. The registered 501(c)(3) nonprofit corporation displays on its website more than 4000 clips of commercials, news broadcasts, PSAs, bumpers, obscure specials, moments of technical difficulties and other off-air recording excerpts, as well as occasional master tapes donated by former television employees.

== Discoveries ==
On March 17, 2011, the museum announced that it had discovered lost footage of Garfield Goose and Friends, which was previewed on its website.

On September 15, 2011, the museum announced that it had discovered and transferred long-lost footage of the original Svengoolie program; it subsequently displayed the missing episodes on its website the following Monday.

On November 27, 2012, WGN-TV announced that it would air a 1971 tape of Bozo's Circus that was recovered with the help of the museum on that year's Christmas Day. WGN has had a mixed relationship with the museum, initially trying to prevent the museum from posting Bozo content; it later dropped most of its objections out of respect for the museum's work preserving the content.

In 2013 the site uploaded "Fahey Flynn Presents Seven's Greetings," a one-hour special that aired once in 1972.

In 2018 the site unearthed a rare color kinescope of a 1971 newscast on WLS-Channel 7, featuring Fahey Flynn, Joel Daly and meteorologist John Coleman.

On April 26, 2022 the museum announced it will be premiering a long-lost episode of 'BJ's Bunch', a Bill Jackson created show done at WNBC in 1973 that was discovered in the Peabody archives.

The channel was threatened with termination in early September 2023 following copyright claims by Sony Pictures Television regarding uploads of 27 rare film prints of Bewitched with original network commercials and bumpers, which it did not contest, but had issues communicating with SPT regarding the claims as they were made by a third-party contractor acting in lieu of SPT known for claims made in error, even involving Sony-owned content. SPT later communicated the copyright claims would be reverted if no further SPT content was uploaded to the channel.
