= Ned Locke =

American television personality and radio announcer (1919–1992)

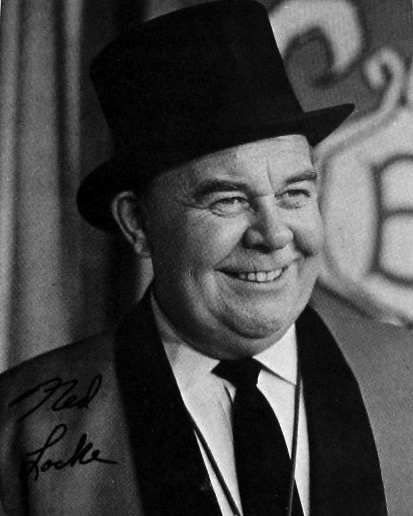
- Born: Norbert Locke; December 25, 1919; Red Wing, Minnesota, US
- Died: February 4, 1992 (aged 72); Kimberling City, Missouri, US
- Occupations: actor and announcer
- Known for: Ringmaster Ned

Norbert Locke, better known as Ned Locke (December 25, 1919 – February 4, 1992), was an American television personality and radio announcer, best known for the role of "Ringmaster Ned" on WGN-TV's Bozo's Circus from 1961 - 1976.

Locke, who was from Red Wing, Minnesota, got into radio quite young, appearing on a program in Minneapolis-St.Paul when he was only nine years old. Locke performed in various theater companies after his high school graduation and became a radio announcer for WHO (AM) in Des Moines, Iowa.

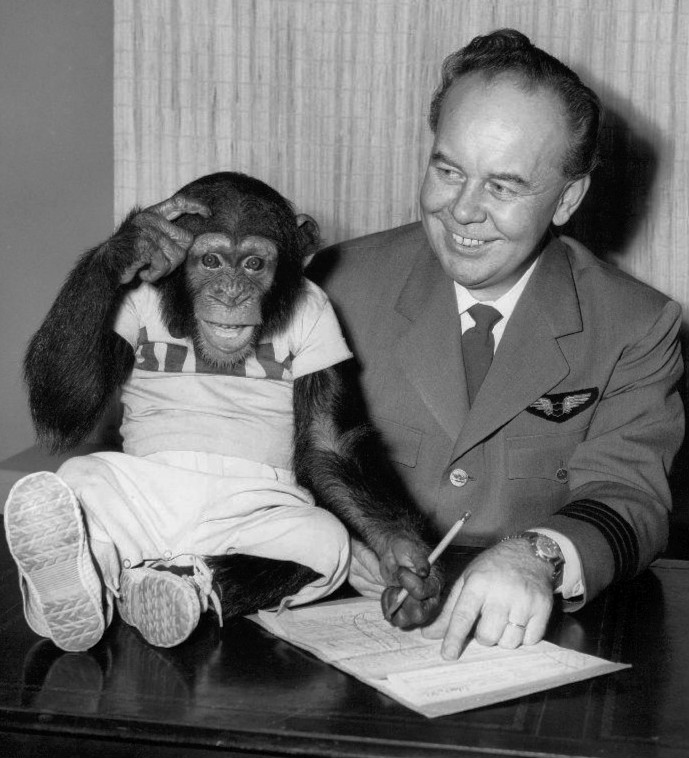
Locke as Captain Hartz, 1955.

By 1950, he was appearing on WMAQ (NBC) radio in Chicago, on a program called Uncle Ned's Squadron. It was his appearance here that led him to substituting for longtime Chicago children's host Johnny Coons on his Noontime Comics series on WNBQ (now WMAQ-TV) in 1951. An avid pilot who both operated two Des Moines area airports and trained pilots, Locke initially commuted to Chicago for his weekly radio program. Locke also served as the director of aeronautics for the state of Iowa for seven years. His substitute television appearance led to other children's shows: Sunday Funnies, where Locke read the newspaper comics on television and Captain Hartz and His Pets, sponsored by Hartz Mountain. He worked there and at local ABC affiliate WENR (now WLS-TV) appearing in teledramas, musicals, commercials and even writing a teleplay called Jet Pilot. He wrote over 2,500 radio and television shows during the course of his career.

He moved over to WGN-TV in 1956, where he was a weather forecaster; co-starred on the children's series Lunchtime Little Theater; and later wrote, produced and starred in the children's program Paddleboat; Roy Brown served as the show's puppeteer. He got the role of Ringmaster Ned, for which he is best remembered, on September 11, 1961, when Bozo's Circus made its debut. Locke received his ringmaster costume for the show on the last episode of Paddleboat. Locke stayed on until he retired from television in 1976. He temporarily came out of retirement and made appearances as Ringmaster Ned for the 25th and 30th anniversaries of the show.

A survivor of three heart attacks, after going into retirement he moved to Kimberling City, Missouri, where he was chief of police, owned a real estate firm, and was later mayor until his death from liver cancer in 1992. He was survived by his late wife, Rose, sons Norbert Jr. and Robert and his grandchildren. One of Locke's ringmaster costumes is part of the Museum of Broadcast Communications' Bozo's Circus collection.

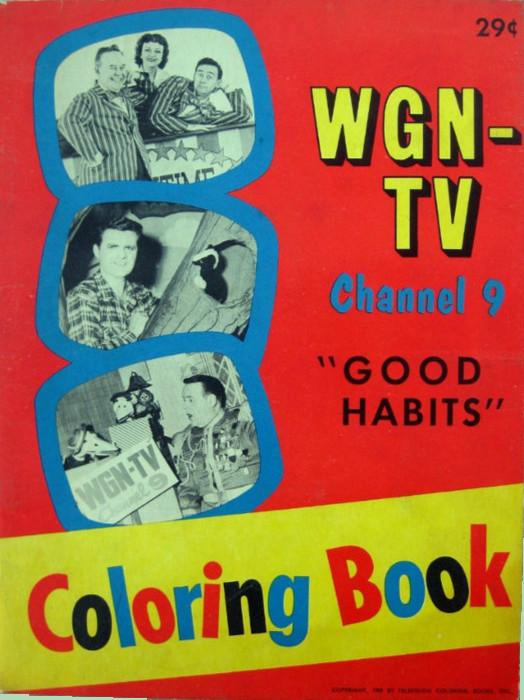
WGN-TV coloring book, 1959. Lunchtime Little Theater is on cover.

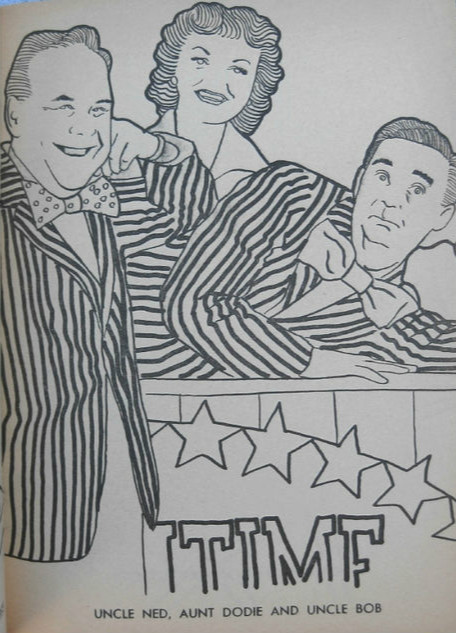
Ned Locke as Uncle Ned, Lunchtime Little Theater.
