= Museum of Broadcast Communications =

American museum in Chicago, Illinois

- Established: 1987
- Location: Chicago, Illinois
- Directors: David Plier (president, CEO, and board chairman, September 2023–present)
- Website: www.museum.tv

The Museum of Broadcast Communications (MBC) is a nonprofit institution in Chicago, Illinois, devoted to collecting, preserving, and exhibiting historic and contemporary radio and television content. It provides education through its archives, exhibits, programs, screenings, publications, and online resources.

== Museum locations ==
=== Founding (1982-'87) ===
The museum was proposed in 1982 by Chicago journalist and broadcaster Bruce DuMont, nephew of Allen B. DuMont, founder of the DuMont Television Network. The Chicago Chapter of the National Academy of Television Arts and Sciences made a research-and-development contribution to help launch the initiative that year. It was chartered as a nonprofit in October 1983.

By January 1986 the planned museum had received a donation of more than 42,000 hours of vintage radio programming from Chicago radio host Chuck Schaden, formerly of news/talk WIND-AM, who had presented Those Were the Days on classical station WNIB-FM for nine years and had been hosting Radio Classics on WBBM-AM since December 1985. Executive director Beverly Kennedy said the staff was still scouting for a location and hoped to open within 18 months. Schaden's collection and the museum's own radio archive were to be presented in two of six planned "decade rooms", each furnished as a living room of a particular decade from the 1930s to the 1980s and equipped with period radios and televisions. Programming was to include recordings of Jack Benny, Edgar Bergen and Charlie McCarthy, The Lone Ranger, Red Skelton and Orson Welles, with a particular focus on network shows that had originated in Illinois and on Midwestern performers, producers, writers and broadcasters. Kennedy said the museum would ideally be housed in a facility of 20,000 to 22,000 square feet and that the project as a whole was likely to cost a seven-figure sum. Arthur C. Nielsen Jr. of the A. C. Nielsen Company was chairman of the museum's board at the time.

=== River City (1987-'92) ===
On June 13, 1987, the Museum of Broadcast Communications opened at the River City complex, 800 S. Wells St., in Chicago. The River City location included study bays, multimedia exhibits (including the Kennedy-Nixon debates), a “Sportscaster’s Cafe,” and displays from local TV and radio programs of yesteryear.

=== Chicago Cultural Center (1992-2003) ===
On June 13, 1992, the MBC moved to the Chicago Cultural Center, occupying about 15,300 square feet.

=== 360 N. State St. (2003-'23) ===
In 2003 the board purchased a former parking garage and car dealership at 360 N. State St. to create a permanent home. Construction and opening were delayed until the State of Illinois provided a $6 million capital grant. After being dormant for eight and a half years as a brick-and-mortar destination, the museum reopened in its new location on June 13, 2012, exactly 25 years after it first opened its doors. (Technically, the National Radio Hall of Fame gallery, located on the second floor of the museum, had been open to the public since December 1, 2011.) The pre-opening ceremony on June 12 included actors John Mahoney (Frasier) and Betty White (The Golden Girls) and newscaster Hugh Downs (20/20).

=== COVID-19 Pandemic and Temporary Closure (2020-'23) ===
The museum temporarily closed on March 15, 2020, in response to the COVID-19 pandemic. It partially reopened in summer 2020 but later shifted to online programming. The State Street building sustained damage during civil unrest in 2020, and attendance declined. On April 30, 2023, the museum announced it would close its doors at 360 N. State Street as Fern Hill exercised its option to acquire the rest of the property; the collection was placed into storage.

=== Pop-Up Location (2025–'27) ===
In August 2025, MBC president, CEO, and board chairman David Plier announced plans to reopen the museum on October 24 in a pop-up location at 440 W. Randolph St., in Chicago's West Loop neighborhood, where it would remain through January 2027. Planned exhibits included "Johnny Carson: The Centennial," "75 Years of Late-Night Television," "WGN-TV's Bozo’s Circus at 65," a 60th-anniversary celebration of I Dream of Jeannie, "Five Decades of the Loop Radio," and a pop-up interactive Radio Hall of Fame. As of June 2026, exhibits on those topics remain up at that location and a capital campaign is underway to make it the MBC's permanent home.

== Leadership ==
Arthur C. Nielsen Jr. (1919–2011), son of the founder of the A.C. Nielsen Company, served as the first chairman of the Museum of Broadcast Communications, beginning in 1984, and later became emeritus chair.

Bruce DuMont founded the museum and was president and CEO from its inception through his retirement at the end of 2017. He died on September 10, 2025, at age 81.

Broadcast executive Larry Wert was named interim chairman of the board in October 2016 after DuMont announced his intention to retire. He served through June 2019, helping to stabilize finances.

Julian Jackson, formerly the vice president of design at the Milwaukee Public Museum, became the MBC's new executive director on March 19, 2018. He resigned a year later after accepting a new position with Freeman Exhibit Solutions in Schiller Park, Illinois.

Susy Schultz, president of the Chicago nonprofit Public Narrative and a former journalist for the Chicago Sun-Times, became the museum's new executive director on August 19, 2019.

Schultz stepped down in September 2021, at which point board member Jim Carlton, a marketing executive, became interim executive director. Two years later, in September 2023, Carlton exited and David Plier, a weekend host on WGN 720 AM who was already the chairman of the MBC's board as of June 2019, took on the additional titles of president and CEO to oversee development of the museum's next location.

== History ==
The Museum of Broadcast Communications was founded in 1982 but didn't open until June 1987 in the River City condominium complex, located at 800 S. Wells St. It remained there until June 1992, when it moved to the Chicago Cultural Center. The MBC then left the Cultural Center in December 2003, with plans to open in a new, 62,000-square-foot building of its own at 360 N. State St. in 2005. Subsequently, construction of the new MBC experienced various delays and setbacks and was halted in May 2006; by December 2008 the half-completed building was slated to be sold, which MBC founder and president Bruce DuMont blamed on a lack of $6 million in state funding that had reportedly been promised to the museum three years earlier.

On November 7, 2009, DuMont announced that funding for the museum from the state of Illinois had finally been obtained and that construction would begin once again. Twelve days later, Kevin Fuller, a resident at DuMont's home in Oak Park, Illinois, was arrested by federal agents for possession and online distribution of child pornography. (DuMont and Fuller married in 2023.) The following month DuMont hosted a construction fundraiser for the MBC in Oak Park, hosted by former local children's-TV host Bill Jackson, and in June 2010, Governor Pat Quinn stated that Illinois would give the MBC a capital grant of $6 million to help complete its new home.

The MBC was back under construction by mid-2010. It was set to include expanded areas for collection development, two exhibit galleries, and working radio and television studios. The State of Illinois set a deadline of May 2011 to finish basic interior work and landscaping, but because of cold weather, the museum was given a 30-day extension on its original April 30 deadline.

Shortly before the museum reopened, the Chicago Tribune reported that Bruce DuMont had obtained the aforementioned $6 million grant "after telling the state he intended to create 200 year-long construction jobs and 19 museum staff positions (15 full-time jobs and four part-time ones)," but he expected the museum to have only 11 part-time workers by the time of the reopening and said that 180–200 construction workers, employed for as much as ten months and as little as several days, helped finish the new building. When asked to explain why the number, and duration, of jobs created was lower than what he'd promised to the state legislature, DuMont replied, in an email, "If the MBC can manage our operations with fewer people and do so efficiently, we will do so, just like the Chicago Tribune has done." DuMont told the Tribune that waiters, hotel employees, and other members of the service industry would find employment, presumably in restaurants and hotels surrounding the museum, because of the reopening, and that the MBC could inspire people to seek out careers in broadcasting. "I think inspiration is a form of job creation," DuMont said, "because it changes one life."

According to a February 2011 press release centered on the MBC's partnership with Cleversafe to provide online access to its archives, roughly 70,000 registered users and 4.5 million unique visitors had accessed the MBC's 400,000 online videos between 2009 and early 2011, and more than "240,000 visitors from across the country are projected for the [museum's] first year of operation." However, museum attendance "dropped drastically, from 225,000 annual visitors when MBC was at the Cultural Center and free to 7,300 last year at the current entrance fee of $12," reported the Chicago Reader in May 2015. "Then in 2013, what DuMont describes as a 'server crash' destroyed access to the 10 percent of the museum's archive of radio and television programming that had been digitized and made available to the public for free."

In December 2012 Crain's Chicago Business reported that the MBC "now owes less than $3 million on a mortgage held by Pepper [Construction, the contractor for the State St. facility] and has arranged another three years for paying down that debt." More than four and a half years later, in July 2017, Crain's revealed that the MBC's mortgage deadline had been pushed back from the end of 2015 to the end of 2017, and that as of August 2016 the museum "owed $2.5 million to Pepper Construction"; furthermore, "the museum posted $53,674 in ticket revenue" in 2015 along with "an operating deficit of $561,331, according to its tax filing for that year, the most recent available." Four weeks later Crain's reported that Pepper Construction had granted the MBC another year to pay off its debt, extending the mortgage deadline to December 31, 2018.

In September 2017 the MBC announced the debut of "Saturday Night Live: The Experience," a 12,000-square-foot exhibit acquired from Premier Exhibitions that was set to open the following month and run through the end of 2018 on the museum's second and fourth floors. "It's a grab for the gold ring," MBC president Bruce DuMont told the Chicago Tribune. "I think it's going to dramatically change the museum for the better. We're very excited about it. There's going to be more attention, more traffic, more buzz about the things we do here." (Premier Exhibitions filed for bankruptcy protection in June 2016.)

On March 2, 2018, media blogger Robert Feder reported that the museum was "looking to sell two floors of its four-story building at 360 North State Street." "We simply are looking at options to improve the future educational and entertainment experience for our patrons," said MBC board chairman Larry Wert. "Any proceeds would put the institution on a solid financial foundation." Wert, Tribune Media's president of broadcast media, was elected interim chairman of the MBC board in October 2016, less than two months after Bruce DuMont announced that he planned to retire as the museum's president. (Until Wert became the interim chairman of the board, the position had "been vacant since 1995 when the late Arthur C. Nielsen Jr. stepped down after 11 years," wrote Feder that October.)

However, shortly after DuMont made his announcement in August 2016, the website Chicagoland Radio and Media reported, "Officially, DuMont is voluntarily retiring from the MBC, claiming the decision is entirely his own, although in reality, there is far more behind it," including alleged financial mismanagement and controversy surrounding his personal life; additionally, DuMont would "remain at least until a successor has been found and begun in the MBC President role. This could take up to a year." DuMont's final two-year term as president ended on December 31, 2017, without a successor in place, but on March 19, 2018, Robert Feder reported that Julian Jackson, formerly the vice president of design at the Milwaukee Public Museum, had been named the MBC's new executive director.

Nearly six months later, on September 17, 2018, Feder reported that the MBC's board of directors was close to finalizing a deal to sell the museum's third and fourth floors to Fern Hill, a real estate development and investment firm. "Sources said the agreement will net $6 million, to be used to continue operating the museum and paying down debt – especially a $3.7 million mortgage held by Pepper Construction Co.," Feder wrote. The deal closed on March 1, 2019, with executive director Julian Jackson telling Feder, "When we open the next phase of the permanent museum, we plan on providing a state-of-the-art experience to all of our guest [sic], while delivering brand value to our sponsors and supporters." That same week the Chicago Tribune reported that the MBC was "negotiating with Cleveland’s Rock and Roll Hall of Fame to bring two special exhibitions here beginning in June," and that after the March 31 closing of "Saturday Night Live: The Experience," which had been held over for three months, the museum's second floor was "expected to be closed for at least April and May" as the MBC reduced its exhibition and event space "from 25,000 square feet to 12,500." On March 18, 2019, Robert Feder reported that Julian Jackson had resigned as the MBC's executive director after one year, having told the board of directors that he'd "accepted a new position with Freeman Exhibit Solutions in Schiller Park."

"Louder Than Words: Rock, Power & Politics," on loan from the Rock and Roll Hall of Fame, opened on May 24, 2019, for a three-month run on the MBC's second floor. On July 26 Robert Feder reported that Susy Schultz, president of the Chicago nonprofit Public Narrative and a former journalist for the Chicago Sun-Times, had been named the museum's new executive director, effective August 19. (David Plier, the CEO of Retail First Corp. and a local radio personality, had replaced Larry Wert as the chairman of the MBC board at the end of June.) In its July 26 story on Schultz's hiring, the Chicago Tribune reported that the Rock and Roll Hall of Fame's exhibit "Stay Tuned: Rock on TV" was scheduled to open in October, and "the museum next year plans to remodel its primary exhibition space on the second floor and remake its central exhibition on television history," according to MBC officials.

The MBC temporarily closed its doors on March 15, 2020, because of the COVID-19 health crisis, and announced that it would "be accelerating the release of its online curriculum for 'The Great Debates,' which examines the impact of the broadcast industry on the campaign for the presidency. It was scheduled to be released when the exhibit opens this summer, but that was moved up to early April."

In October 2021 the Chicago Tribune reported, "After closing in March 2020, MBC opened briefly that summer. Poor attendance forced the museum closed again, and they chose to focus on educational programs and an online lecture series prior to a soft reopening" on October 2, 2021, with a "grand reopening" taking place later that month.

The MBC announced on its Facebook page in the early hours of April 30, 2023, that its final day of operation at 360 N. State St. would be that day from noon to 4 PM because its remaining exhibit space at that address "has been sold to a developer." The Chicago Tribune reported that "Fern Hill exercised a provision in its 2019 purchase of the third and fourth floors to buy the rest of the building," with a contract being signed in mid-April, and that a local college campus was a possibility for the museum's next address. According to Talkers.com, the museum "anticipates being able to re-open ... within the next 18 to 24 months."

== Archives ==
The MBC holds more than 85,000 hours of radio and television broadcasts across genres, over 8,000 commercials, and 3,800 documentaries including the run of PBS’s Frontline from 1983 to 2006. However, the majority of these broadcasts have not yet been digitized. It also maintains a civil-rights collection of over 450 programs digitized with funding from the Oprah Winfrey Foundation, a military history collection funded by the Tawani Foundation and a political collection funded by the Brinson Foundation.

In addition to radio and television materials, the museum houses nearly 4,000 photographs and 3,000 artifacts, including program guides, scripts, props, costumes and promotional items. The museum's entire archive, minus any items on exhibit at the pop-up location, is currently in storage.

The Weinberg Education Program offers online and onsite access to historic assets and teaching materials.

== Publications and Collaborations ==
Encyclopedia of Television, edited by Horace Newcomb, has more than 1,000 online essays. Library Journal calls it "the most definitive resource on the history of television worldwide."

== Exhibits ==
The MBC's exhibits since 1987 have included:

- "Puppets, Pies and Prizes" (2001)
- "The Chicago School of Television" (ongoing)
- "Advertising's Greatest Icons" (2015)
- "Saturday Night Live: The Exhibition" (2017-'19)
- "Louder Than Words: Rock, Power & Politics" (2019)
- "Stay Tuned: Rock on TV" (2019-'20)
- "A Century of Radio" (2021-'23)
- "Not Ready for Prime Time: Five Live Decades of Saturday Nights" (2025-'27)
- "We’ll Be Right Back: Eight Decades of Television Commercials" (2025-'27)
- "Johnny Carson: The Centennial" (2025-'27)
- "75 Years of Late-Night Television" (2025-'27)
- "Celebrating 100 Years of Dick Van Dyke" (2025-'27)
- "WGN-TV's Bozo’s Circus at 65" (2025-'27)

In June of 2026, MBC received the set from the The Late Show with Stephen Colbert after the show was canceled by CBS. This includes "Colbert’s actual desk, chairs, credenza, stage columns and other set pieces," according to the Chicago Tribune, which also reports that MBC hopes to open an exhibit of the Late Show material later in the summer.

== Radio Hall of Fame ==
The National Radio Hall of Fame was established by the Emerson Radio Corporation in 1988 and has been operated by the Museum of Broadcast Communications since 1991. It recognizes individuals, executives, and programs that have made significant contributions to the development of radio in the United States. As of 2025, more than 350 personalities, executives, and programs have been inducted. The 2025 induction ceremony is scheduled to take place on October 30, 2025, at Swissôtel in Chicago.

Until October 2017, when "Saturday Night Live: The Experience" opened, the second floor of the MBC's 360 N. State St. address was the site of the National Radio Hall of Fame (NRHOF) gallery. (When the SNL exhibit closed in the spring of 2019 and the MBC sold the third and fourth floors of its building, the NRHOF gallery was partially restored on the second floor.) The NRHOF has been affiliated with the MBC since 1991. The museum was also home to the American Advertising Federation's Advertising Hall of Fame from 1992 to 2000.

== See also ==
- 20th Century Technology Museum
- The Museum of Classic Chicago Television
- Museum of Radio and Technology
- Museum of the Moving Image
- Paley Center for Media
- Pavek Museum of Broadcasting
- Radio Hall of Fame
