= Starfleet Badge =

A Starfleet Badge or Starfleet Pin may refer to one of the following Star Trek related subjects:

- Communicator (Star Trek), a fictional communication device used by Starfleet personnel.
- Starfleet ranks and insignia, one of several various pins or badges worn by Starfleet personnel.
