= Bozo, Gar and Ray: WGN TV Classics =

Television special

Bozo, Gar & Ray: WGN TV Classics is a two-hour television special produced by WGN-TV in Chicago, Illinois which focuses on children's programming which aired on the station from 1955 to 2001. It debuted on December 24, 2005 and has been featured on both WGN-TV and its former superstation WGN America. The program is hosted by WGN-TV personality Dean Richards.

The retrospective airs annually, usually on Thanksgiving, as well as on Christmas Eve, on WGN. It historically aired immediately after WGN's coverage of the Chicago Thanksgiving Parade each Thanksgiving. Due to the COVID-19 pandemic cancellation of the 2020 Chicago Thanksgiving Parade, WGN aired Bozo, Gar & Ray: WGN TV Classics and a later compilation special, Bozo's Circus: The 1960s, in the parade's usual morning timeslot. After WGN lost the rights to the Chicago parade to WCHU and WAOE in 2021, it scheduled the specials in the same time slot as it had in 2020. In 2022, Bozo, Gar & Ray aired the following Sunday after Thanksgiving with Bozo's Circus: The 1960s and 1970s specials airing on Thanksgiving day.

The show was created in response to the continuing popularity of WGN programming, including Bozo the Clown, which had been seen weekdays on WGN from 1960 to 1994 and weekly until 2001. Because most Bozo episodes were either wiped or never recorded, and because of scheduling constraints, rerunning the show was not an option. Thus, WGN decided to feature the best of existing recordings of its Bozo programs Bozo's Circus (1961–1980), Big Top (1965–1967), The Bozo Show (1980–1994) and The Bozo Super Sunday Show (1994–2001); as well as the long-running children's programs Garfield Goose and Friends, and Ray Rayner and His Friends, both of which are well known in Chicago although less known outside the area.

The special also features three animated shorts, all of which have aired on WGN-TV for many years: Hardrock, Coco and Joe: The Three Little Dwarfs; Suzy Snowflake; and the original 1954 UPA version of Frosty the Snowman (not to be confused with the 1969 Rankin/Bass version, which aired on CBS).

The program is not available on any home media format, although the animated shorts are available separately through the Museum of Broadcast Communications. Some of the Bozo content is available through The Museum of Classic Chicago Television, which hosts the content through a fair use gentlemen's agreement with WGN.

In 2019, WGN aired a special ahead of Thanksgiving called Bozo's Circus: The 1960s, a two-hour compilation of seldom-seen, remastered clips from the show during that decade. In 2021, a follow-up special called Bozo's Circus: The 1970s premiered. Both specials, along with Bozo, Gar and Ray, continue to air throughout the Thanksgiving and Christmas holidays each year.
