= Tricorder X Prize =

Competitive prize contest

Qualcomm Tricorder X PRIZE
- Awarded for: developing a device that can "diagnose patients better than or equal to a panel of board certified physicians"
- Country: Worldwide
- Presented by: X PRIZE Foundation (sponsored by Qualcomm)
- Rewards: Grand Prize US$7 million Second Prize US$2 million Third Prize US$1 million
- First award: 2014
- Website: https://www.xprize.org/prizes/tricorder

The Qualcomm Tricorder XPRIZE was an inducement prize contest announced on May 10, 2011, sponsored by Qualcomm Foundation. It officially launched on January 10, 2012. The $10 million prize is awarded for creating a mobile device that can "diagnose patients better than or equal to a panel of board certified physicians". The name is taken from the tricorder device in Star Trek which can be used to instantly diagnose ailments. The focus of the competition guidelines was towards clinical symptoms, versus accurate measurement of test values.

Although no team successfully met all the requirements of the grand prize, the competition was concluded in April 2017 when the XPRIZE Foundation awarded reduced prizes to the strongest performing teams. For the first time at any XPRIZE, the leftover funds from the main prize purse were earmarked for further development, consumer testing, and commercialization of tricorder prototypes for the two finalists and four semi-finalist teams as part of the Post Prize Initiative.

== Prize details ==
The Qualcomm Tricorder XPRIZE originally offered a US$7 million grand prize, US$2 million second prize, and US$1 million third prize to the best among the finalists offering an automatic non-invasive health diagnostics system that meets the following requirements. The final contest rules deviated from a single portable device and allowed the contestants to utilize multiple devices (as a system), thus moving away from the concept of a Star Trek tricorder. This rule expansion allowed teams to utilize some existing off-the-shelf add-ons or modifications to meet the aims of the competition.

- Weighs no more than 5 pounds (2.3 kg)
- Able to autonomously diagnose 13 medical conditions (12 diseases and the 'absence of conditions'), including anemia, atrial fibrillation, Chronic obstructive pulmonary disease (COPD), diabetes, leukocytosis, pneumonia, otitis media, sleep apnea, and urinary tract infection . The contest rules focused more on diagnosis versus monitoring or treatment of medical conditions.
- Able to continuously record and stream the 5 main vital signs: blood pressure, heart rate, oxygen saturation, respiratory rate and temperature.

The name is taken from the tricorder device from the science fiction TV series Star Trek which can be used to instantly diagnose ailments. The prize was initially announced by the X PRIZE Foundation on 10 May 2011 and subsequently launched on 10 January 2012 at CES 2012.

Devices were sent to the University of California San Diego to be independently tested on patients during the winter and spring of 2015, and again in late 2016 at the Altman Clinical and Translational Research Institute (ACTRI) at UCSD.

== Final round ==
The two teams to compete in consumer testing round:

- Dynamical Biomarkers Group (Taiwan), Team led by Chung-Kang Peng of the Harvard Medical School.
- Final Frontier Medical Devices (USA) - Team led by brothers Basil and George Harris, founders of Basil Leaf Technologies.

== Teams selected ==
The 10 teams to be selected to compete were:

- Aezon (USA) - Student engineers team from Johns Hopkins University partnering with the Center for Bioengineering Innovation & Design.
- Cloud DX (Canada) - Team from medical devices company Cloud DX, Inc and led by company chief medical officer Sonny Kohli.
- Danvantri (India) - Team from technology company American Megatrends India and led by Sridharan Mani.
- DMI (USA) - Team led by Eugene Y. Chan of the DNA Medicine Institute partnering with NASA, the National Institutes of Health and the Bill and Melinda Gates Foundation.
- Dynamical Biomarkers Group (Taiwan) - Team led by Chung-Kang Peng of the Harvard Medical School.
- Final Frontier Medical Devices (USA) - Team led by brothers Basil and George Harris, founders of Basil Leaf Technologies.
- MESI (Slovenia) - Team from medical device company MESI, partnering with Jozef Stefan Institute, D.Labs, and Gigodesign, led by Jakob Susteric.
- SCANADU (USA) - Team from SCANADU, led by Walter De Brouwer.
- SCANurse (UK) - Team from medical company SCANurse, led by Anil Vaidya.
- Zensor (Ireland) - Team from medical company Intelesens, led by Jim McLaughlin.

== Conclusion of the contest ==
In the end, no team met all the requirements needed to win the full prize purse for a minimally invasive health diagnostics system that could meet the guidelines of diagnosis set forth by the contest rules.

In April 2017 X PRIZE Foundation made the following awards for a total of $3.7 million:

- $2.6 million to Final Frontier Medical Devices as the highest performing team
- $1 million to Dynamical Biomarkers Group for second place
- $100,000 to Cloud DX as the first Bold Epic Innovator, "in recognition of exponential technological progress in the field of consumer-focused medical technologies, and potential for expanding access to healthcare when deployed at scale".

The rest of the original $10 million prize purse was diverted to ongoing consumer testing to get tricorder technology into the hands of patients ($3.8 million) and adapting tricorders for use in hospitals in developing countries ($1.6 million).

== See also ==
- Medical tricorder
- Trimprob
- Nuclear magnetic resonance spectroscopy
- Nuclear quadrupole resonance
