= Star Trek: Elite Force II =

2003 video game

- Developer: Ritual Entertainment (Note: Mac OS X version developed by Westlake Interactive)
- Publisher: Activision (Note: Mac OS X version published by Aspyr)
- Director: Jon Galloway
- Designer: Christopher A. Stockman
- Programmers: Steven Peeler, Doug Service
- Artist: Jon Galloway
- Composer: Zak Belica
- Series: Star Trek: Voyager; Star Trek: The Next Generation
- Engine: id Tech 3
- Platforms: Windows, Mac OS X
- Release: Windows: EU: June 20, 2003; NA: June 24, 2003; Mac OS X: NA: November 19, 2003
- Genre: First-person shooter
- Modes: Single-player, Multiplayer

Star Trek: Elite Force II is a first-person shooter video game developed by Ritual Entertainment and published by Activision. It was released on June 20, 2003 for Microsoft Windows and later for Mac OS X. Elite Force II is a sequel to 2000's Star Trek: Voyager – Elite Force. Whereas the original game was powered by the first version of id Software's id Tech 3 engine, Elite Force II is based on a heavily modified version of the Quake III: Team Arena engine with Ritual's ÜberTools GDK, allowing for expansive outdoor environments and higher quality facial animations.

== Gameplay ==
In Elite Force II, the main protagonist makes his way through linear and strictly defined levels, encountering various kinds of hostile creatures along the way. He is often accompanied by members of the Hazard Team who cooperate with him. These characters often help Munro enter areas or disable devices crucial for the plot to evolve.

When switched to secondary mode the tricorder can detect and highlight structural defects.

There are total of 15 weapons (including the tricorder) at the player's disposal. All of them facilitate two modes of operation. The primary fire commonly releases a steady stream of shots (or energy bursts) inflicting low damage at a low ammo cost, while the secondary fire expends a larger amount of ammo to fire a much slower and more powerful blast. All energy-based weapons can be recharged using terminals while projectile-based weapons need to be supplied with appropriate ammo. Health is replenished by activating nanites in player's suit using health stations.

Although Elite Force II is a first-person shooter, solving puzzles is also required. During the waveform modulation the player is presented with random sine wave attributes of which must be exactly reproduced by using the tricorder. There are three options - amplitude, frequency and offset modulation - that accordingly alter the initial curve. On higher difficulty levels a factor of time is to be taken into account; if the protagonist does not complete the puzzle within the time limit, the waveform is generated again with different proportions. To help the player a composite visualization is present.

Power routing minigame

Power routing is needed when certain devices too difficult for the tricorder to modulate must be turned on. The objective is to connect two nodes on the opposite sides of the grid by manipulating pipes.

On higher difficulty levels, the number of nodes to be connected rises and a time limit is introduced. If player fails to solve the puzzle within the time frame, the pipes are reset to their original positions.

In scripted situations, the main character may also choose a response from a predefined set which has an effect on the outcome of the discussion and possible repercussions. For instance if Munro offers a prisoner chance to escape, he ends up in prison himself. A preference regarding a love interest is also determined from the choice of dialogue options - the player can accept invitations from one of two female non-player characters.

Throughout the course of game, the player is given a possibility to collect golden starships (miniature models of USS Excelsior NX-2000) to unlock additional content in a form of six additional playable levels. There are a total of 81 starships, 70 of which are required to unlock the six secret maps accessible via the main menu.

== Plot ==
Unlike the first game, Elite Force II is largely set on board the USS Enterprise-E stationed in the Alpha Quadrant. The game's storyline is a semi-sequel to the movie Star Trek: Nemesis, and the end of Star Trek: Voyager series. Many of the members from the original Hazard Team reappear. However, only a few of the primary cast of Star Trek: The Next Generation did voice acting for the game, among them Patrick Stewart as Jean-Luc Picard and Dwight Schultz as Reginald Barclay. Tim Russ returned to do voice work as Tuvok. Several actors from Star Trek series provided additional voice acting: Jeffrey Combs (Weyoun from Star Trek: Deep Space Nine and Commander Shran from Star Trek: Enterprise) as one of the main villains; Tony Todd (Kurn from The Next Generation) as Korban; J. G. Hertzler (Martok from Deep Space Nine, plus roles in Voyager and Enterprise) as Lurok; and Vaughn Armstrong (Admiral Forrest in Enterprise) who contributed several character voices.

Robert O'Reilly voices the character Krindo; he plays as Gowron elsewhere in the franchise.

In the game, the player reprises the role of Alexander Munro (voiced by Rino Romano), a Starfleet lieutenant. During the first several levels Lieutenant Munro returns to the Alpha Quadrant with the rest of the Voyager's crew and is assigned to a teaching position at Starfleet Academy. Eventually he is transferred to the position of a newly formed Hazard Team's leader on Enterprise-E under the command of Captain Picard. There are also limited opportunities for exploring the ship between missions, reminiscent of the "Virtual Voyager" feature found in Star Trek: Voyager – Elite Force's expansion pack.

The game begins with Voyager traveling through a Borg transwarp conduit (as seen in the Voyager series finale, "Endgame") when a Borg sphere captures the ship. The Hazard Team, led by Lieutenant Munro, is dispatched to destroy the sphere's dampening field. Voyager then breaks free from the Borg Sphere and returns to the Alpha Quadrant.

A screenshot from the game depicting a shootout between the player and the Romulans in a simulated scenario

Considered to be redundant, the Hazard team is split up; Munro is assigned to teach small unit tactics at Starfleet Academy. Two years later and after the events of Star Trek: Nemesis, Captain Picard witnesses his performance and requests that Munro re-establish the Hazard Team for service on board the USS Enterprise-E. Shortly after the reinstatement, the Enterprise receives a distress call from the USS Dallas, where Telsia Murphy, a former member of the Hazard Team, has been assigned as a security officer.

Once aboard, the Hazard Team encounters a race of aliens (later dubbed Exomorphs) who have commandeered the ship. After saving the remaining crew, Munro is reunited with Telsia, who joins the team. A nearby Attrexian station which the Dallas had sought to aid is still besieged by the Exomorphs. When the defense systems are reactivated the remaining invaders abandon the station, leaving ion trails which the Enterprise follows to the planet Idryll.

There the Hazard Team locates an archaeological post manufacturing the Exomorphs under control of Krindo, his father, and Kleeya (an optional love interest of the main character). The Idryll explain that the creatures turned hostile because of a malfunction. Kleeya later decides to stay on board the Enterprise, which upsets Krindo. His forces invade the Enterprise in proximity of another Exomorph-infested colony, Taravar 7.

The Enterprise fends off the attackers and the Hazard team is beamed to Taravar 7, where it aids the inhabitants. In a nearby factory, Krindo's crashed ship is discovered. Munro is captured, but is set free when Krindo witnesses his father's death at the hands of the Exomorphs he created, which no longer obey him. Munro then persuades him to help stop the Exomorphs and the two escape together.

On the Enterprise, Krindo confesses he made money by selling Idryll artifacts to a Ferengi named Omag. He surmises that Omag decoded the location of Master Control Facility, a place with the ability to override all other centers controlling Exomorphs. With Krindo's help, Omag is tracked to a nearby mercenary base and captured.

During his interrogation, Omag reveals that the coordinates to the facility were sold to a secret Romulan group called the Empty Crown. Munro infiltrates the base in a Romulan disguise and with the help of a spy retrieves the location of the Master Control Facility. However, when the informant declares her true allegiance to the Empty Crown, a fight ensues. Gonzalez, one of the Hazard Team members, subsequently sacrifices himself so that Munro can be transported to safety.

The final battle takes place in the Romulan Neutral Zone. Munro enters the facility where the remnants of Empty Crown forces reside under the leadership of Commander Suldok. While the Enterprise is threatened by Romulan Warbirds for violating the Neutral zone, the final confrontation commences on the surface. It culminates with Munro defeating Suldok and confronting the overmind of Exomorphs, a creature called Archeopendra.

After the battle, Munro returns to the Enterprise, where Picard hands over the evidence regarding the Empty Crown and peacefully leaves the Neutral zone. He is also extremely pleased with the Hazard Team's performance and recommends the incorporation of similar units within Starfleet. In the last scene Alexander Munro is seen kissing either Telsia Murphy or Kleeya, depending on whose invitation he chose during the exploration of the ship.

== Development ==
Towards the end of March 2002, rumors were reported that a sequel to Elite Force was in development. Activision confirmed these rumors at the beginning of April, officially announcing Star Trek: Elite Force II on April 4, 2002. The game was the last Star Trek title to be developed under Activision's supervision, following a dispute with Star Trek licensing holder Viacom, and was produced by Ritual Entertainment. Like Elite Force, Elite Force II was developed on the id Tech 3 game engine, one of the last games to do so. A port developed by Westlake Interactive and published by Aspyr for Mac OS X was released in November 2003.

In November 2003 Ritual Entertainment released the source code of their server-side code base for multiplayer gaming under a non-commercial license.

== Reception ==
Reception

Aggregate score
Aggregator	Score
Metacritic	78/100

Review scores
Publication	Score
Computer Games Magazine	2.5/5
Computer Gaming World	3.5/5
Edge	6/10
Eurogamer	7/10
Game Informer	8.5/10
GameRevolution	B+
GameSpot	7.9/10
GameSpy	4/5
GameZone	8.4/10
IGN	8.4/10
PC Gamer (US)	86%
TheGamer	78/100

Star Trek: Elite Force II was a commercial failure, and became Activision's final Star Trek title. Jon Galloway of Ritual Entertainment later said, "[W]ithin weeks of launch, we had several rounds of layoffs and it was a tragedy." Galloway and Activision attributed the game's poor sales to Viacom's handling of the Star Trek license, which they argued had led to "stagnation" by the time of Elite Force II's release. Activision subsequently sued Viacom, which responded with a countersuit. James Hoyle of Den of Geek later summarized, "The parties settled in secret and the licence passed to other publishers." Despite the poor sales, Elite Force II received "generally favorable reviews" according to the review aggregation website Metacritic.

In 2017, PC Gamer ranked Star Trek : Elite Force II among the best Star Trek games.
