= Trimprob =

The TRIMprob (Tissue Resonance InterferoMeter Probe) is a portable system for non-invasive diagnosis of biological diseases invented by Italian physicist Clarbruno Vedruccio. It consists of a computer-controlled radio frequency interferometer detecting differences in electromagnetic properties in cancerous tissue.

== History ==
The discovery in 1992 of the TRIMprob came almost accidentally during the development of a land mine detector. At that time Vedruccio suffered from a severe attack of gastritis, and as he was approaching a probe for the detection of high frequencies radio waves, he noticed a drop in the signal corresponding to 930-940 MHz. He immediately realized that his state of health had an influence on the probe that by chance was tuned on that specific range of radio frequencies. As a consequence of this initial work, three radio waves(465 MHz, 930 MHz, 1395 MHz) that showed interaction with diseased tissues were identified. The device was initially patented in 1995 as a medical equipment for the treatment of diseases according to alternative medicine paradigms. In a successive patent of 1999 the device is more precisely characterized and presented as an "Electromagnetic analyzer of anisotropy in chemical organized systems" and thus as a means of powerful preventive diagnostics in the medical field. In 2003 the defense electronics company Galileo Avionica (now Selex Galileo), started the production of the TRIMprob under license. The production from Galileo Avionica stopped abruptly in 2007. This latest event reached the Italian Senate in 2011, when a senator raised a parliamentary inquiry regarding the ceased production. In 2013, a company located in Faenza re-started the production of the TRIMprob.

== Scientific evidence ==
The device has been shown to have a high accuracy rate for the early diagnosis of cancer.

== See also ==
- Tricorder X Prize
- Medical tricorder
- ESO-MED 8G
