= Medical tricorder =

Potential medical diagnostic device

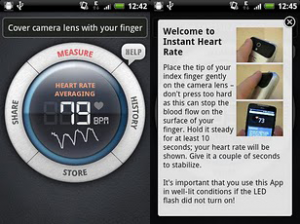
Smartphones may be used as medical tricorders; smartphone software and camera detect pulse from a fingertip using a technique similar to that of a pulse oximeters.

A medical tricorder is a handheld portable scanning device to be used by consumers to self-diagnose medical conditions within seconds and take basic vital measurements. While the device is not yet on the mass market, there are numerous reports of other scientists and inventors also working to create such a device as well as improve it. A common view is that it will be a general-purpose tool similar in functionality to a Swiss Army Knife to take health measurements such as blood pressure and temperature, and blood flow in a noninvasive way. It would diagnose a person's state of health after analyzing the data, either as a standalone device or as a connection to medical databases via an Internet connection.

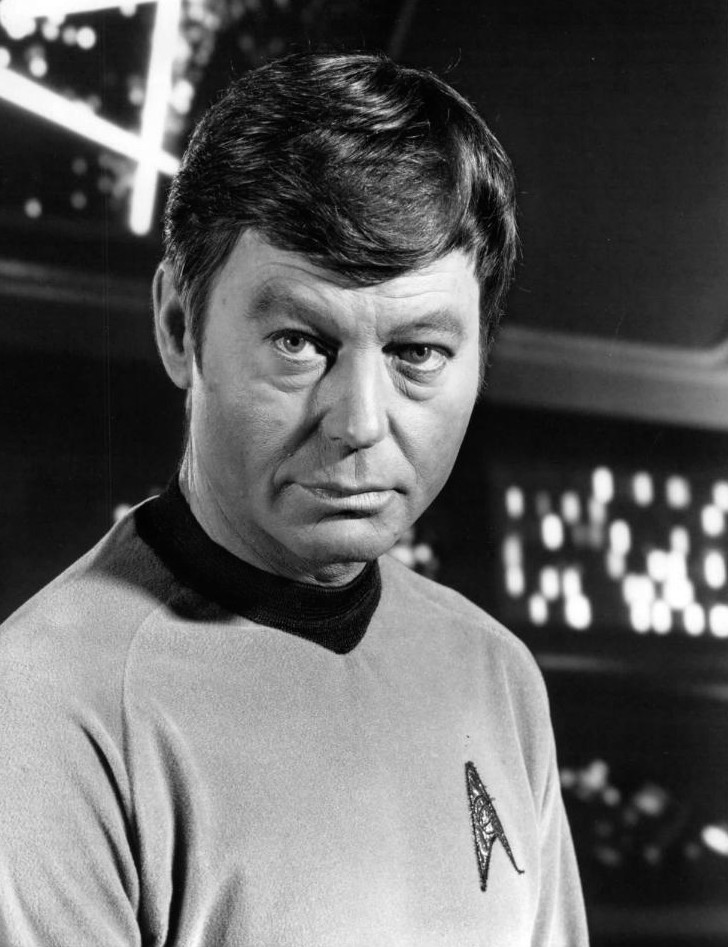
The TV show Star Trek had a fictional Dr. McCoy who used a device called a tricorder to examine patients in an instant. The fictional device has spawned a search for its real-life equivalent.

The idea of a medical tricorder comes from an imaginary device on the science fiction TV show Star Trek from the 1960s which featured fictional character Dr. Leonard McCoy using it to instantly diagnose medical conditions. One description of the fictional device was as follows:

The medical tricorder has a detachable, high-resolution, hand-held scanner that sends life-sign information to the tricorder itself. It can check all vital organ functions, detect the presence of dangerous organisms, and human physiology. Its data banks also contain information on non-human races known to the Federation, thereby making it possible to treat other life-forms.

— report in the BBC

Several reports suggest that there may be opposition to the development of such a device by national medical regulating authorities such as the Food and Drug Administration in the United States, as well as possible opposition by doctors unwilling to permit consumers to do extensive self-diagnosis which might result in inappropriate self-medication. There is agreement that such a device could bring huge increases in productivity and cost-savings, and spur a billion dollar market. There are signs that over a hundred venture-capital firms have invested $1.1 billion in digital health technology in 2012.

== X Prize Competition ==
An inducement prize from Qualcomm of US$10,000,000, the Qualcomm Tricorder X Prize that was announced in 2012, has spurred the scientific and medical communities in a global competition. featuring 230 teams from 30 countries to create such a device. The X Prize Foundation launched the Tricorder X PRIZE at the 2012 Consumer Electronics Show in Las Vegas and promised to award $10 million to the first team to build a medical tricorder. According to the prize guidelines, the device should diagnose 15 different medical conditions, including a sore throat to sleep apnea to colon cancer. The prize will be awarded partially on the basis of which invention has the most consumer friendly interface. To win the prize, a successful medical tricorder will have to diagnose these conditions across "30 people in 3 days".

== Functions of a medical tricorder ==
There is agreement that a device should be able to do the following:

- Diagnose disease.
- Show ongoing personal health metrics such as heart rate.
- Monitor ongoing health.
- Summarize a person's state of health.
- Confirm quickly if a person is healthy or not. This function would be similar to the check engine light on a car.

== How it might work ==
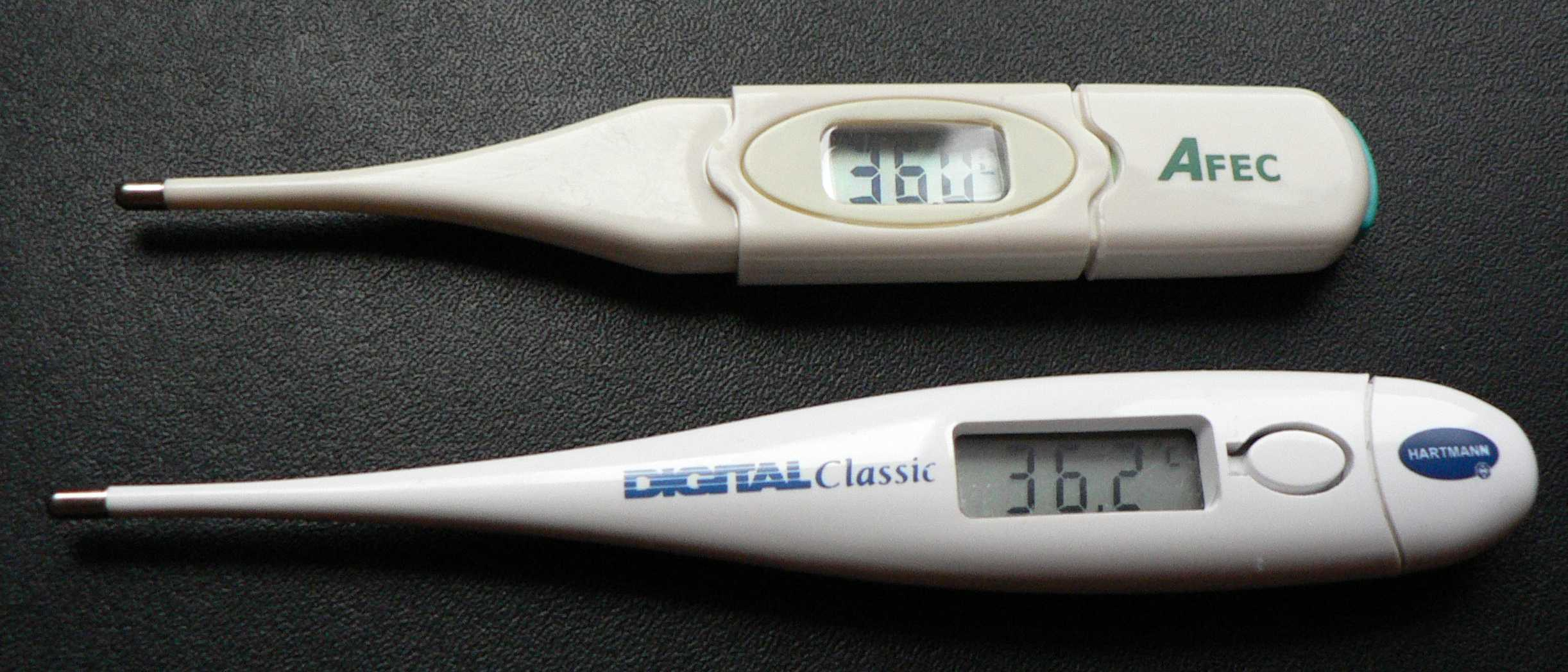
The conception of a medical tricorder will be a general purpose scanner with many functions, including that of measuring temperatures like these digital thermometers.

As of 2012, there were devices built for medical professionals to analyze specific diseases or take specific health measurements, but there was not one all-purpose consumer device to diagnose a variety of conditions. Numerous accounts at that time speculated that the advent of high-power computer chips, cell-phone technology, and improved scanners would mean that such a device would likely be invented in the next few years. There were devices available at the time which could perform a single function analysis, such as a thermometer measuring bodily temperature, however a true tricorder-like device would be able to perform a variety of basic yet important tasks. For example, it may be possible to combine a high-power microscope with a cellphone and use it to analyze swab samples electronically. Two electrodes on a device may measure heart action and serve as a portable electrocardiogram. Glucose levels can be measured by sampling tiny blood samples. A tricorder could analyze polarized light coming from a person's skin to reveal information about cancer or the healing of a wound. Sensors could pick up on abnormalities with DNA as well as the presence of antibodies. An ultrasonic probe could plug into a smartphone, allowing it to be used to create ultrasound images. Medical tricorders could hypothetically work by sensing "volatile organic compounds our bodies secrete" by some means of smell. A second report confirms that sensitive electronic "noses" may detect infections such as pneumonia from a person's exhaled breaths.

== Similar devices ==
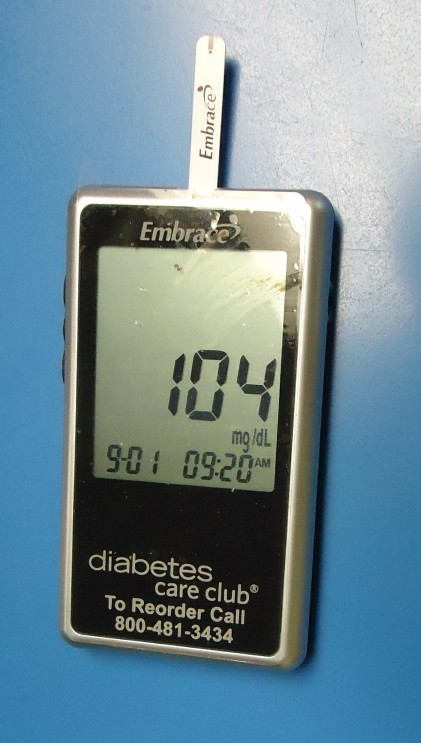
A handheld single-function electronic device to measure glucose levels of diabetics. Performing this and other tests would be one of the many functions of a medical tricorder.

There are reports that medical tricorders may emerge from "diagnostic medical apps" via Tablet Computers and smartphones. Some existing smartphones have been used as medical devices in the sense that text reminders have been sent to a patient about prescription renewals, and downloadable apps allow cameras in cell phones to act as sensors to track heart and breathing rates. One neurologist uses iPhone smartphone apps entitled Liftpulse and iSeismograph to diagnose and measure tremors in patients with Parkinson's disease. Some apps take advantage of sensors built into the smartphone hardware, such as a microphone, camera, GPS, accelerometer, gyroscope, magnetometer, proximity sensor, luxmeter, and sensors for temperature and humidity. Physicians use a device called an otoscope to look inside the ear, and such a device could be made which clips onto an iPhone, according to one report. There was a report that a tricorder to detect atmospheric analysis has been built. There are reports of fitness scanners available which are worn on a person's wrist, which relay information such as heart rate. The United States Department of Homeland Security has announced a "standoff patient triage tool" which is laser-based which helps medics evaluate a patients' vital signs wirelessly from 40 feet (12 m) away.

== In the marketplace ==
There are reports of products in development and in the marketplace.

- Scanadu. A device made by the firm Scanadu is a small hand-held sensor which is put next to a patient's forehead which detects vital signs such as heart rate, breathing rate, blood oxygenation, pulse transmit time and temperature, and has electrodes to measure heart signals, and works in conjunction with a mobile app. There was a report that it was being used by aquatic oceanographer and filmmaker Fabien Cousteau to monitor the health of underwater divers. The firm reportedly raised $1,664,574 from 8,500 backers through crowdfunding. Reporters described the Scanadu Scout:

A hockey puck-shaped object that can apparently measure your temperature, heart rate, oximetry (blood oxygenation), run an electrocardiogram, gauge heart rate variability, clock pulse wave transit time (related to blood pressure), perform a urine analysis and calculate a metric Scanadu refers to (vaguely) as "stress." All you have to do to get these readings, urine analysis notwithstanding, is hold the Scout against your forehead for a few seconds.

— Matt Peckham in Time Tech, May 2013

The Scanadu Scout Medical Tricorder is a device straight out of the Star Trek. This device is packed with sensors ... bring the Tricorder in direct contact with your left temple for 10 seconds and it will analyse your vitals, including the temperature, heart rate, oximetry, ECG, respiratory rate, blood pressure, urine analysis and emotional stress level. The results of this analysis will be recorded and shown to you via a smartphone app.

— February 2014 in The New Indian Express

- QuantuMDx Group. This British biotech firm is developing a device described as a "handheld DNA lab" to analyze malaria; the firm is raising capital by means of crowd funding. It developed a virus detection device called Q-POC which breaks open cells to analyze their DNA.
- Ibis Biosciences. This firm has developed an analysis machine that can "identify about 1,000 of the most common disease-causing bacteria, viruses and fungi within a few hours of taking a patient's blood sample" by comparing the genetic fingerprints of pathogens against a reference database.
- Verily Life Sciences announced a project called "Tricorder" in 2014, but as of 2016 development is "floundering".
- TRIMprob (Tissue Resonance InterferoMeter Probe) is a portable system for non-invasive diagnosis of biological diseases invented by Italian physicist Clarbruno Vedruccio. It consists of a computer-controlled radio frequency interferometer detecting differences in electromagnetic properties in cancerous tissue.
- Standoff Patient Triage Tool (SPTT) takes key physiological readings necessary to any diagnosis—pulse, body temperature, and respiration. SPTT uses a technology known as laser Doppler vibrometry, which has been used in aircraft and automotive components, acoustic speakers, radar technology, and landmine detection. When connected to a camera, the vibrometer can measure the velocity and displacement of vibrating objects. An algorithm then converts those data points into measurements emergency medical responders can use in their rapid assessment of a patient's critical medical conditions.
- Berkeley Tricorder A research project funded by the NIH which was capable of measuring a subject's ECG, EMG, Blood Oxygenation, Respiration (via Bioimpedance), and motion; open-sourced on completion.
- Tricorder.Zero As of 2025, a proof-of-concept prototype raising on WeFunder in advance of a planned crowdfunding campaign and accepting pre-orders for an estimated "Q1 2026" planned shipping timeframe, this 7-sensor fully-integrated health & fitness tracker seems to be the first upcoming consumer electronics device (in design and features, compared to other “tricorders” that are medical devices) seeking to be a true tricorder.
