= MESI (company) =

- Founded: 2009
- Headquarters: Ljubljana, Slovenia
- Website: www.mesimedical.com/home

MESI (Note: Its full name is MESI Simplifying diagnostics.) is a measuring medical devices manufacturer. They develop and produce medical devices for diagnostics purposes and are the maker of MESI mTABLET, a predictive medical assessment platform for healthcare with extensive AI.

== History ==
MESI was founded in 2009 by Jakob Šušterič, an electrical engineering student at the University of Ljubljana in Slovenia. The company is based in Slovenia, with a branch in London.

=== X Prize Competition ===
Their design of a wristband that collects individual's data and a smartphone application which sends it to a physician who can then prescribe therapy based on a broader range of information, won the company a finalist place in the Tricorder X PRIZE competition.
