= The Wand Company =

Company that designs and manufactures functional prop replicas

The Wand Company Ltd
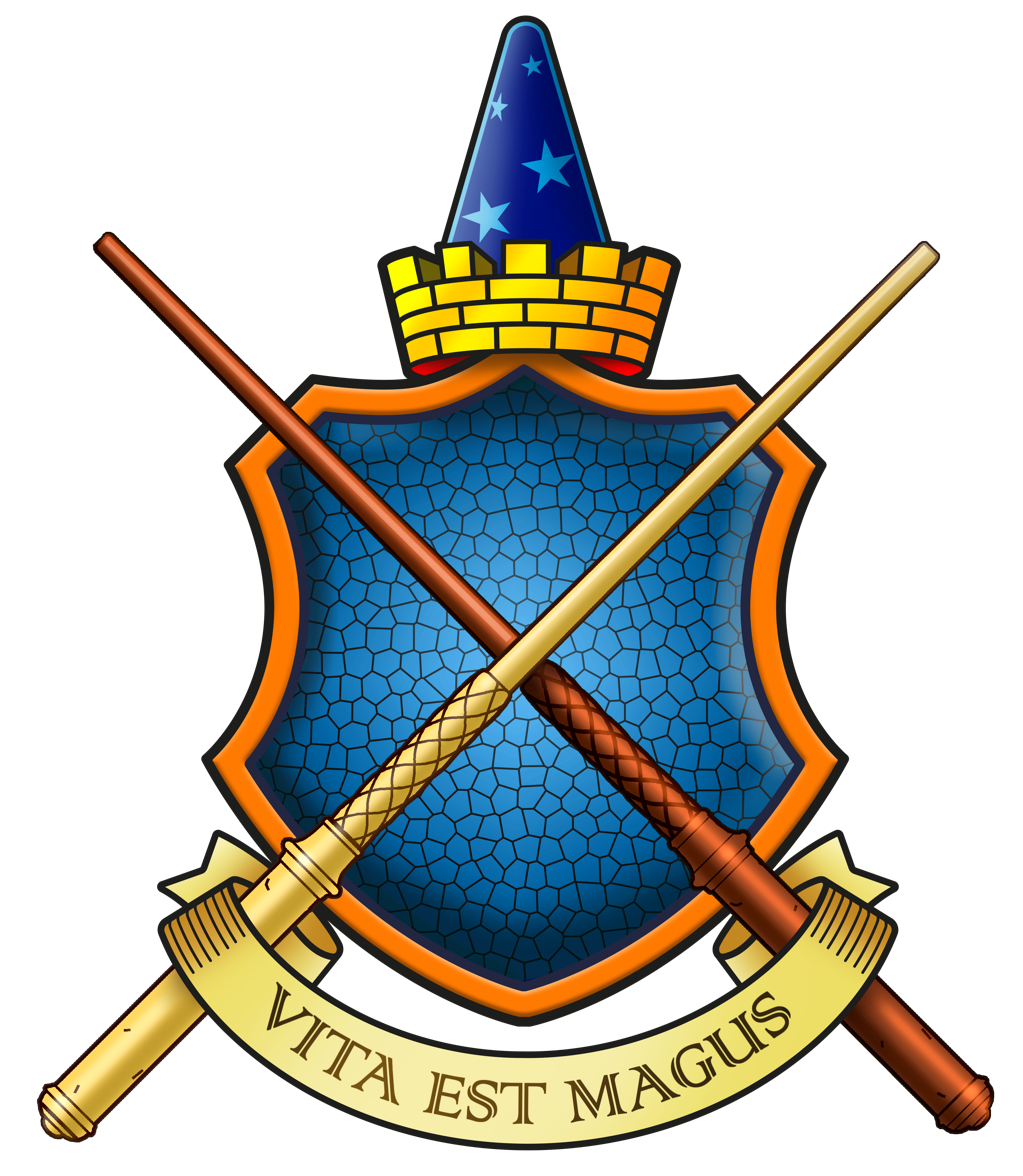
- The Wand Company Coat of Arms
- Trade name: The Wand Company
- Industry: Functional and accurate prop replicas
- Founded: 2009
- Founder: Chris Barnardo and Richard Blakesley
- Headquarters: Cambridge, UK
- Website: thewandcompany.com

The Wand Company is a United Kingdom company that designs and manufactures functional prop replicas. The company was featured on Dragons' Den in 2010, demonstrating its "Kymera Magic Wand Universal Remote Control". Since then, The Wand Company has created additional universal remote control prop replicas in the form of the Tenth Doctor's Sonic Screwdriver, the Eleventh Doctor's Sonic Screwdriver, the Twelfth Doctor's extending Sonic Screwdriver and a Star Trek: The Original Series phaser. They released a functional Star Trek Bluetooth communicator replica in 2016, then expanded into high-end licensed collectibles for other entertainment franchises including Fallout, Pokémon and Starfield, with several products achieving significant commercial success.

== History ==
The Wand Company was founded in 2009 by Richard Blakesley and Chris Barnardo who wanted to combine their forty years of design, development and electronic development experience to make magical/surprising themed products that work as universal remote controls. The company's first product was the "Kymera Magic Wand Universal Remote Control" that is in the style of a wizard's wand and in the first year the product sold 10,300 units.

In 2010 the company appeared on the television show Dragons' Den on BBC Two to ask for financial backing. Duncan Bannatyne agreed to invest £200,000 for 10%. In 2011 Bannatyne announced that The Wand Company had grossed £1 million in the first year, but his investment didn't proceed as the company no longer needed the money.

In 2012 the company manufactured a new product in the form of the Eleventh Doctor's Sonic Screwdriver, later in 2013 the Tenth Doctor's Sonic Screwdriver was released. A 3D Scan was taken of David Tennant's Sonic Screwdriver (which is the last remaining screen used prop from that series) to create the body of the Tenth Doctor's Sonic Screwdriver.

In July 2014 it was revealed on the company's Facebook page that the next product they would be releasing would be a Star Trek phaser replica. Later that month the phaser replica was shown at San Diego Comic-Con by co-founder Chris Barnardo. The Wand Company stated that it used the same technology as the Sonic Screwdriver remotes and that a 3D scan was taken of the original prop to produce this replica.

In July 2015, they revealed they would be releasing a fully functioning Star Trek Bluetooth communicator. The item was released in June 2016.

In 2018, The Wand Company released a self-assembly kit replica of the Pip-Boy from Bethesda's Fallout 76 videogame.

In July 2020 they announced they would release a fully functional Star Trek Tricorder. The finished replica began shipping in April 2025.

In November 2020, The Pokémon Company International announced a partnership with The Wand Company to produce a range of premium die-cast Poké Ball replicas, which launching for Pokémon Day 2021, with a special edition of the Master Ball which was only available from Pokémon Center. The full-sized accurate metal Poké Ball range has gone on to be a huge success, selling over 300,000 units worldwide. In January 2024, the Wand Company launched a range of Mini Poké Balls, as replicas of the small Poké Balls that are stored on the trainer's belt before their expansion to the standard full-size dimension.

It was leaked in January 2022 that they would be partnering again with Bethesda to make a replica of the watch in their upcoming game, Starfield. The existence of the watch was officially revealed at the "Starfield Direct" event in June 2023.

In 2024 it was announced that The Wand Company had taken a license from Amazon to create a functional, wearable Pip-Boy from Amazon's highly successful TV show, Fallout. In May 2024, Chris Barnardo demonstrated the Pip-Boy to Adam Savage on his Tested channel.

In November 2025, the company announced a fully functional Pip-Boy 3000 replica based on Fallout 3 and Fallout: New Vegas, developed using original design data from Bethesda.
