= Hardrock, Coco and Joe =

- Hardrock, Coco and Joe: The Three Little Dwarfs
- Release date: 1951
- Running time: 3 minutes
- Country: USA
- Language: English

Hardrock, Coco and Joe — The Three Little Dwarfs is a 1951 short stop motion animated cartoon based on a song written by Stuart Hamblen. It is about three of Santa Claus' helpers who ride on Santa's sleigh each Christmas. The short has become an annual "Christmas Classic" first on Johnstown, PA WJAC-TV and then following on Chicago's WGN-TV and since its introduction in the mid-1950s. The film is entirely in black-and-white.

The short was originally created by Centaur Productions utilizing the stop-motion talents of artist Wah Ming Chang. Its running time is about 2 minutes and 45 seconds. This cartoon is traditionally broadcast with their two other short Christmas cartoons, Suzy Snowflake and Frosty the Snowman. Centaur assigned copyright on the film to the song's copyright holder, Hill and Range Songs, who renewed the copyright on the film (but not the song) in 1979.

== Story ==
According to the narrative song, Hardrock drives Santa's sleigh, and Coco navigates with maps. Santa "has no need for Joe/ but takes him 'cause he loves him so" (however, in the Bozo the Clown special A Bozo Christmas, Coco states that Joe, who was unable to go with them that year due to illness, was in charge of crisis management). Part of the charm of this primitively-made cartoon is that Joe, the smallest of the three, and very boyish-looking, has a deep bass voice.

Chorus:

Oh-lee-o-lay-dee, o-lay-dee-I-ay
Donner and Blitzen, away, away
Oh-lee-o-lay-dee, o-lay-dee-I-oh
I'm Hardrock!
I'm Coco!
I'm Joe!

The program is available on DVD from the Museum of Broadcast Communications.

== Parody ==
A new generation of animation lovers was introduced to this Christmas classic via the short-lived Comedy Central television series, TV Funhouse, a spin-off of the recurring Saturday Night Live cartoons. In the series' third episode, "Christmas Day", the Hardrock, Coco, and Joe short is satirized under the name "Christmas With Tingles" in which an elf named Tingles magically spreads tension and guilt during the Christmas season. Aside from the subject matter, the spoof stays remarkably faithful to the original, featuring black-and-white stop-motion animation, as well as spoken lyrics backed by an a cappella chorus:

Yo-dee-yo-die-deedle, deedle-ee-dee
Awkwardness and anxiety,
Yeedle-dee-doo-deedle, dee-deedle dension
"I'm Tingles the Christmas Tension!"

The tune of the song featured in the Christmas With Tingles short is almost identical to the tune of the song featured in the Hardrock, Coco, and Joe Three Little Dwarfs cartoon.

This was also referenced in a Mystery Science Theater 3000 episode (Prince of Space).

== Other recordings ==
The song was also recorded by Gene Autry, but in Autry's version, Joe is depicted as having a high, childlike voice, not a bass one.

== See also ==
- Bozo, Gar and Ray: WGN TV Classics
- List of Christmas films
