= Chung-Kang Peng =

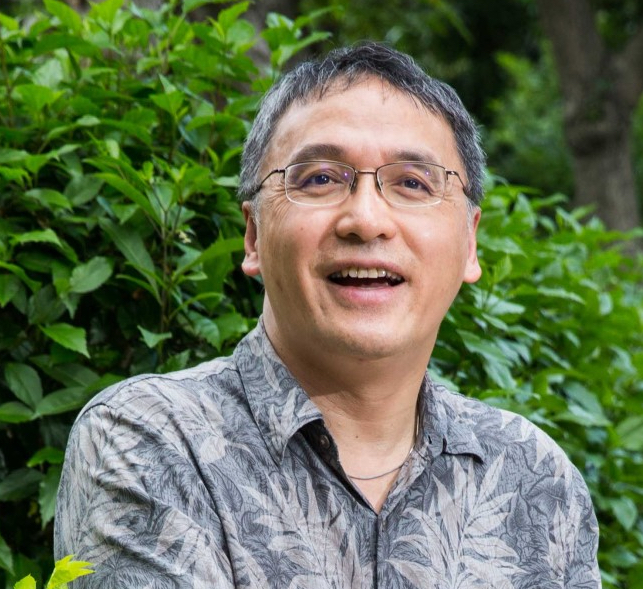
- Chung-Kang Peng, 2017
- Education: National Chiao Tung University (BS); National Tsing Hua University (MS); Boston University (PhD)
- Scientific career
- Fields: Statistical physics
- Workplaces: Beth Israel Deaconess Medical Center; Harvard Medical School; National Central University; National Chiao Tung University

Chung-Kang Peng is a Taiwanese physicist. He is the director of the Center for Dynamical Biomarkers at Beth Israel Deaconess Medical Center and Harvard Medical School (BIDMC/HMS). Under his direction the Center for Dynamical Biomarkers researches fundamental theories and novel computational algorithms for characterizing physiological states in terms of their dynamical properties. He is also currently the K.-T. Li Visiting Chair Professor at National Central University (NCU), Visiting Chair Professor at National Chiao Tung University (NCTU) in Taiwan, and Visiting Professor at China Academy of Chinese Medical Sciences in China. During 2012–2014, he served as the founding Dean of the College of Health Sciences and Technology at NCU in Taiwan.

== Research ==
=== Biomarker development ===
Peng has extensive expertise in statistical physics and its application to the study of physiological measures. Along with fellow collaborators he has developed many novel techniques in this area, including:

- Detrended fluctuation analysis (DFA) which is based on statistical physics, measures fractal properties of physiologic signals (cited more than 6,500 times).
- Multiscale entropy (MSE) which measures the complexity of physiological time-series (cited more than 2,600 times).
- An algorithm, based on information theory and statistical physics, for linguistic analysis of symbolic sequences. It has been applied to bio-medical signals, human languages, and DNA sequences. Prof. Peng received the Calvin & Rose G. Hoffman Prize in 2004 for his contribution of applying the algorithm to analyze the authorship issue of Shakespeare.
- ECG-based cardiopulmonary coupling analysis for the study of sleep. This algorithm has been patented in the U.S. and Europe. An improved algorithm that is based on heart rate variability to detect sleep-disordered breathing has received FDA approvals in the U.S., Taiwan, and China.
- An index for dynamic cerebral autoregulation.

Peng's publications have been cited more than 37,000 times (h-index: 73). He was the recipient of the 10-Years (2002-2012) Innovator Award from BIDMC in 2013, and Distinguished Alumnus Award of NCTU in 2015.

=== Physionet ===
Peng is one of the founding members of the PhysioNet resource. PhysioNet offers free web access to large collections of recorded physiologic signals and related open-source software. PhysioNet has more than 1 million visitors, and more than 200 TB of data downloaded each year.

=== Biomedical device development ===
Jointly with the HTC Corporation, Peng led a team, called Dynamical Biomarkers Group (DBG), of physicians, scientists and engineers to compete in the Qualcomm Tricorder XPRIZE international competition, the biggest biomedical prize in history. Since its announcement in 2012, this XPRIZE attracted the interest of more than 300 teams around the world. The goal of the competition is to develop a mobile solution for end-patients to diagnose their health conditions and monitor their vital signs. The Tricorder name is based on the medical diagnostic device of Star Trek fame. After 4 years of competition and several rounds of eliminations, DBG is one of the top 2 teams that advanced to the final round of competition, and received a $1 million prize for its achievement in April 2017.
