= Communicator (Star Trek) =

Fictional technological device in Star Trek

- Star Trek franchise element
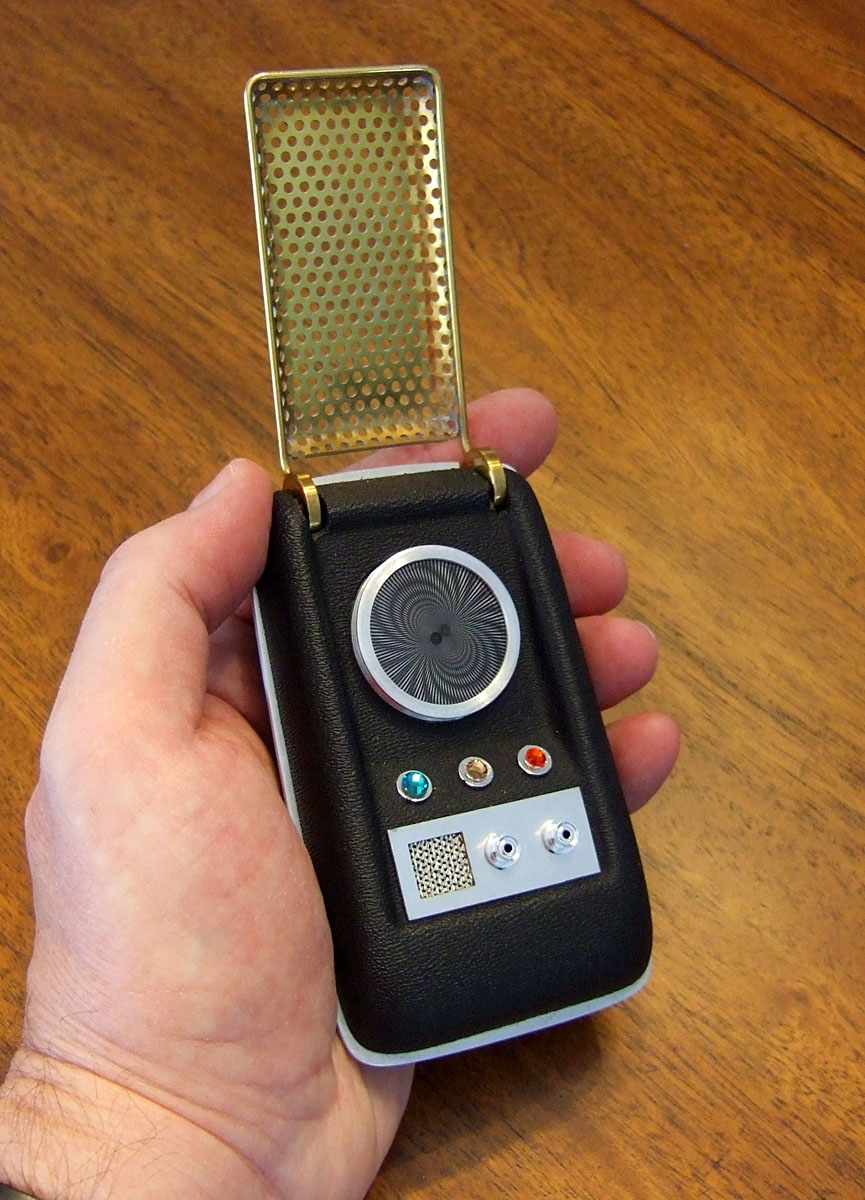
- A 23rd-century communicator as used in Star Trek: The Original Series
- Production company: Desilu Productions
- First appearance: "The Cage"; Star Trek; 1964
- Created by: Gene Roddenberry
- Genre: Science fiction

In-universe information
- Type: Communication device
- Function: Allows subspace communication

The communicator is a fictional device used for voice communication in the fictional universe of Star Trek. As seen in at least two instances, the Original Series episodes "Tomorrow Is Yesterday" and "Day of the Dove," it can serve as an emergency signaling device/beacon, similar to a transponder, and can function as an automatic direction finder ("This Side of Paradise"). The communicator allows direct contact between individuals or via a ship's communication system.

The communicator was designed and built by Wah Ming Chang, who also created other Star Trek props, models, and costumes such as the Tricorder, Vulcan harp, Balok mannequin, M-113 "Salt Vampire", and the Romulan "Bird of Prey."

The communicator in the Star Trek universe surpasses the capabilities of modern mobile phone technology, the prototypes of which it inspired. It allows crew members to contact starships in orbit without relying on a satellite to relay the signal. Communicators use subspace transmissions that do not conform to normal rules of physics in that signals can bypass EM interference, and the devices allow nearly instantaneous communication at distances that would otherwise require more time to traverse.

In Star Trek: The Original Series (TOS), communicators functioned as a plot device, stranding characters in challenging situations when they malfunctioned, were lost or stolen, or went out of range. Otherwise, the transporter could have allowed characters to return to the ship at the first sign of trouble, ending the storyline prematurely.

== Development of communicators ==
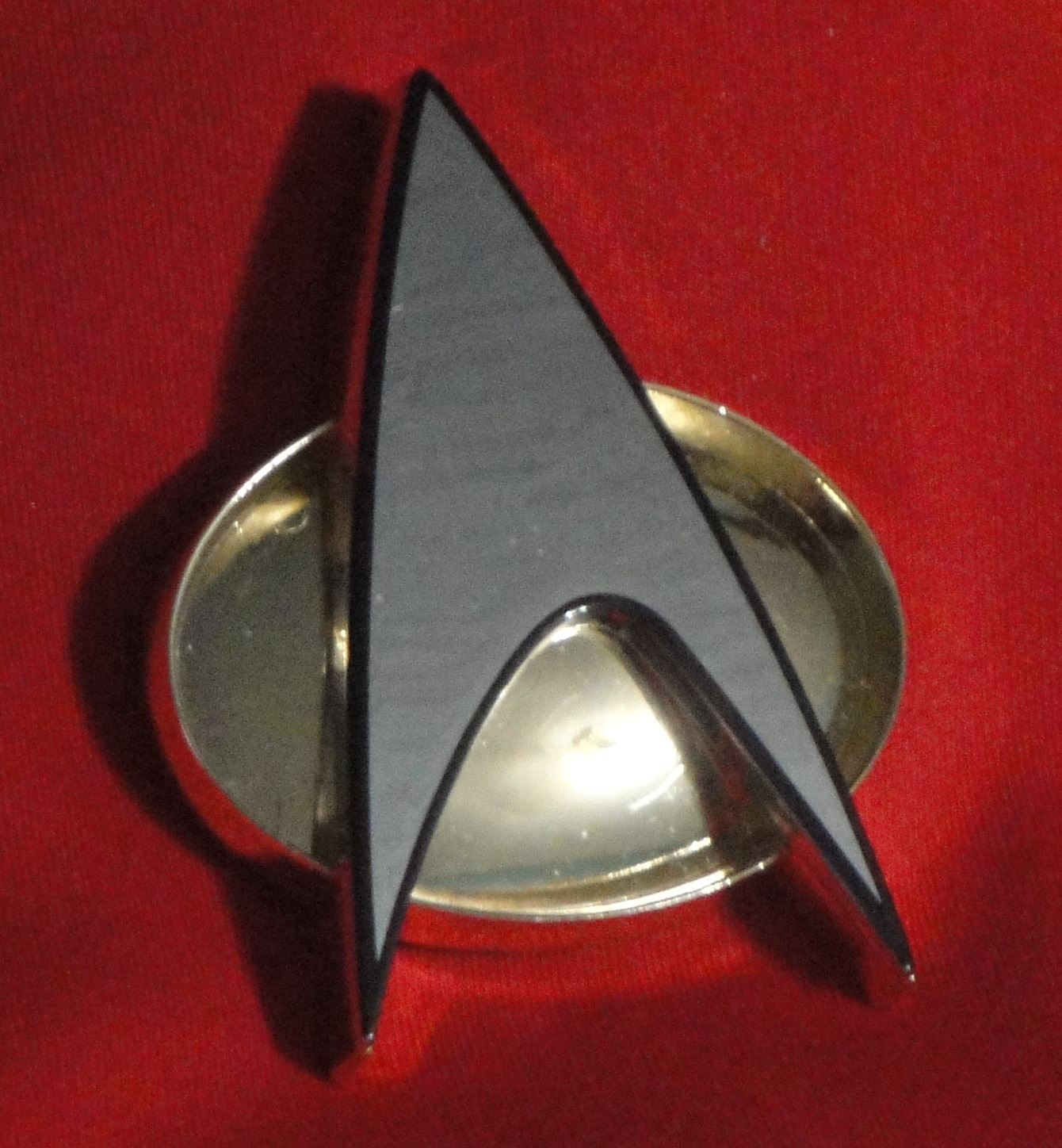
Starfleet communicator badge from The Next Generation and the early episodes of Deep Space 9

Throughout Star Trek: Enterprise and Star Trek: The Original Series, on-ship communication is achieved via communicator panels on desks and walls, and sometimes through the use of videophones. While formed into a landing party, the crew carried hand-held communicators that flip open. The top section contains a transceiver antenna and the bottom contains user controls, a speaker and a microphone. The device was designed and built by Wah Chang, who also built many of the other props used in the series.

Wrist-worn communicators were used in Star Trek: The Motion Picture and remained in use by some Starfleet installations and vessels during the time of The Wrath of Khan. However, the traditional handheld communicator returned in later films. The reason for the switch was not explained, but the non-canon source Mister Scott's Guide to the Enterprise offered the explanation that Starfleet discontinued use of the wrist-worn communicators when they were determined to be prone to repeated failures after suffering minor impacts.

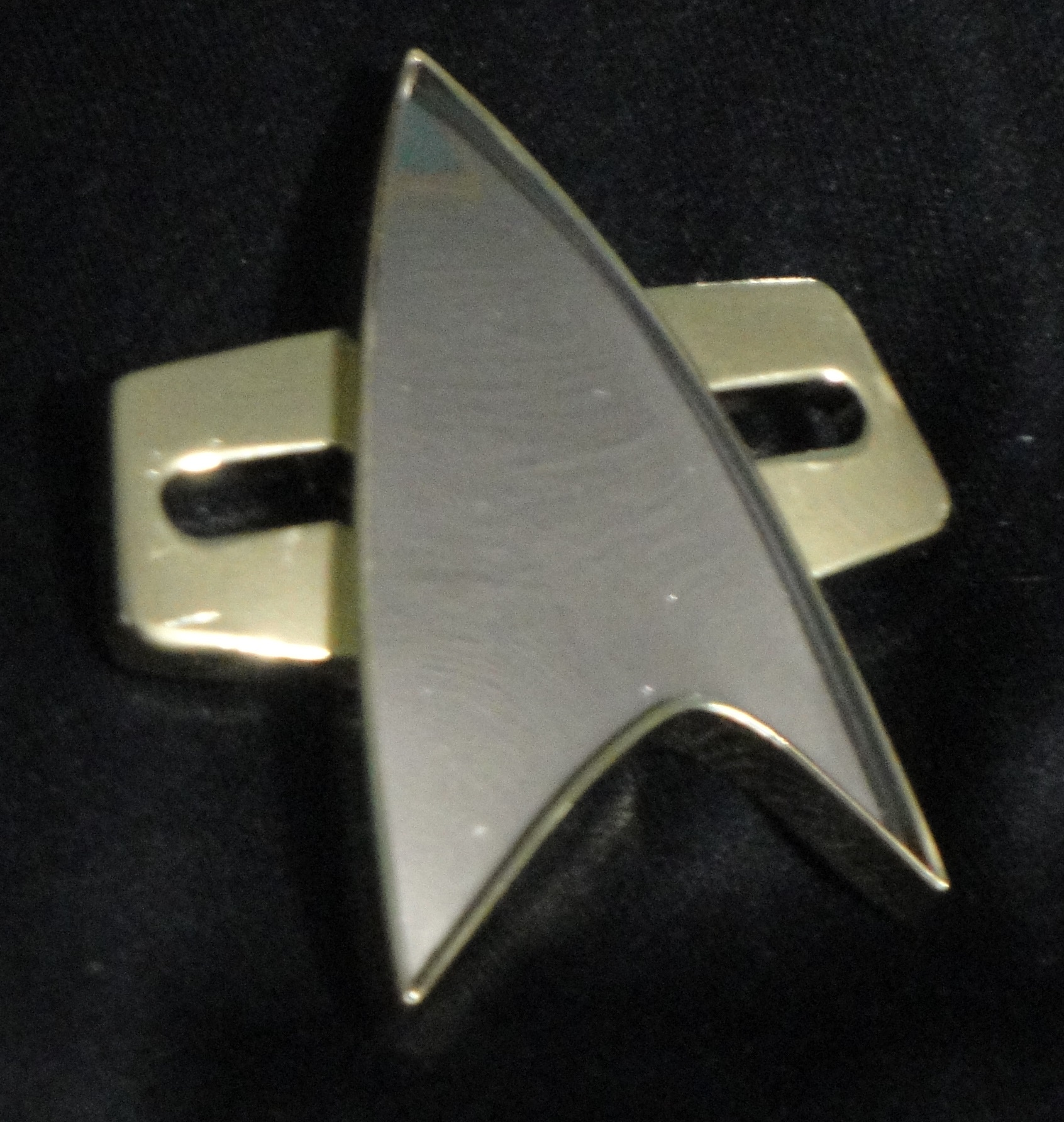
Revised comm badge from the film Star Trek: Generations. This was also used on Voyager and the later episodes of Deep Space 9 as well as the last three TNG films and in the flashback scenes of Picard.

In Star Trek: The Next Generation (TNG) and later series, Starfleet officers and enlisted personnel wear small communicator badges on their left breast. These devices are in the shape of the Starfleet insignia and are activated with a light tap. They also incorporate the universal translator. There have been four versions of the communicator badge seen on screen. The first was a prototype used by members of Section 31 during the second season of Star Trek: Discovery (DIS). The second was used through TNG and in the first two seasons of Star Trek: Deep Space Nine (DS9). The third was used in the last five seasons of DS9, throughout Star Trek: Voyager (VOY), the four TNG films, and in flashback scenes in Star Trek: Picard (PIC). The fourth was seen in use in 2399 in Picard. Use of the modern badges dates back at least as far as the time of the Enterprise-C. (Lt. Richard Castillo is shown wearing a communicator badge in the TNG episode "Yesterday's Enterprise," the Starfleet insignia of his TOS movie-era uniform now functioning as a communicator badge.) According to Data in the episode "Time's Arrow, Part One" at a poker game in 1893, the badge is made out of a crystalline composite of silicon, beryllium, carbon 70 and gold.

In Deep Space Nine, Bajoran officers and enlisted personnel also wear a small communicator badge that functions much the same as their Starfleet counterparts. However, Bajorans wear their badges on the right breast of their uniform tunics. Cardassians are shown wearing their communicators on their left wrist.

While wall and desk panels are still present, officers and crew consider them a secondary system, relying primarily on the badges. Viewscreens are used for visual communications. In Starfleet vessels and installations, communication can also be accomplished by verbally directing the computer to initiate communications with another person.

In the Star Trek: Strange New Worlds episode "Those Old Scientists", First Officer Una Chin-Riley shows the time-traveling Ensign Boimler's communicator delta to Captain Christopher Pike. Upon seeing that the communicator activates with a simple button press, Pike remarks that "flipping it open's the best part."

== Relation to current real technology ==
On July 12, 2010, CBS released an iPhone application, created by Talkndog Mobile, called Star Trek Communicator. The application replicated the design and iconic chirp of the communicator.

In June 2016, The Wand Company Ltd. released an accurate and working replica of the Star Trek: The Original Series Communicator using Bluetooth to enable it to pair with, and connect to, a Bluetooth-enabled mobile phone so as to allow it to be used in the way envisioned in the original Star Trek TV show; to make and receive calls. It also offers cosplay functions featuring sound effects and voice clips. Advances in voice recognition and cloud-based artificial intelligence allow the user to use voice dialing via the rather simple interface, but also to ask questions using Siri, Google Assistant, Cortana or any other digital personal assistant through the Communicator. This is much the same as when a member of the Enterprise crew in the original series poses a query to the ship's computer or asks for a status update.

In December 2016, Fametek LLC. released the Star Trek: The Next Generation CommBadge using Bluetooth 4.2 technology to enable it to pair with a Bluetooth enabled mobile phone or tablet to make and receive calls and utilizes voice commands via Siri, Google Assistant or Cortana. The Bluetooth ComBadge also has a "cosplay mode" which when pressed activates the same Chirp sound effect as seen on the show.

No real-world equivalent to subspace communication has been developed, proposed, or theorized. However, many other aspects of Starfleet communications technology are commonplace. For example, locator/transponder functionality is implemented via GPS, LoJack, RFID, and radio direction finder devices, and cloud-based digital assistants perform in a way similar to the artificial intelligence of a Starfleet ship's computer.

== See also ==
- Clamshell design
- "Grillo" flip phone (Italy, 1965)
- Motorola StarTAC
