= Star Trek uniforms =

Fictional uniforms

Star Trek uniforms are costumes worn by actors portraying personnel of a fictitious Starfleet in various television series and films in the Star Trek science fiction franchise. During the various series, the costume design has often changed to represent different time periods and for reasons of appearance and comfort. Sometimes different styles were deliberately mixed to enhance the sense of time travel or alternative universes.

== Original series ==
The original uniform designs were the product of costume designer Bill Theiss. These uniforms consisted of a colored top and dark pants, with significant variations between the designs used in the pilot episodes and the rest of the series.

=== Pilot version ===
The original uniform as worn by Captain Christopher Pike and First Officer "Number One" in the first pilot "The Cage", and by Captain James T. Kirk in the second pilot "Where No Man Has Gone Before"

The Starfleet uniforms seen in the unaired pilot "The Cage" (footage of which was re-used in a later episode, "The Menagerie") and the second pilot "Where No Man Has Gone Before", consisted of a tunic with a heavy ribbed turtle neck collar for men, and a cowl neck variation for women, each in three colors: gold, beige ("sand"), and light blue, worn over charcoal slacks. Gray jackets were sometimes worn on landing party duty.

Officers in the first Star Trek pilot, "The Cage", wore a single solid gold sleeve stripe, and only the officer grades of "lieutenant" and "captain" were used in dialog. A "chief" was also visible, but wearing a different sleeve stripe, consisting of two thin lines encircling the cuff, with a wavy gold line appearing above and below these lines. Characters addressed as "crewman" wore no sleeve insignia. The gray coats also bore silver rank stripes on the sleeves. In the second pilot episode, "Where No Man Has Gone Before", most officers again wore a single stripe; Captain James T. Kirk wore two stripes.

The rank indicators used in the pilots and the production series differed because Roddenberry and Theiss had not yet worked out a consistent system for officer-grade indicators on the uniforms; this they would do after the second pilot.

The original series Starfleet uniforms do not include headgear of any sort, including the officer's combination cap and service side cap.

=== Production version ===
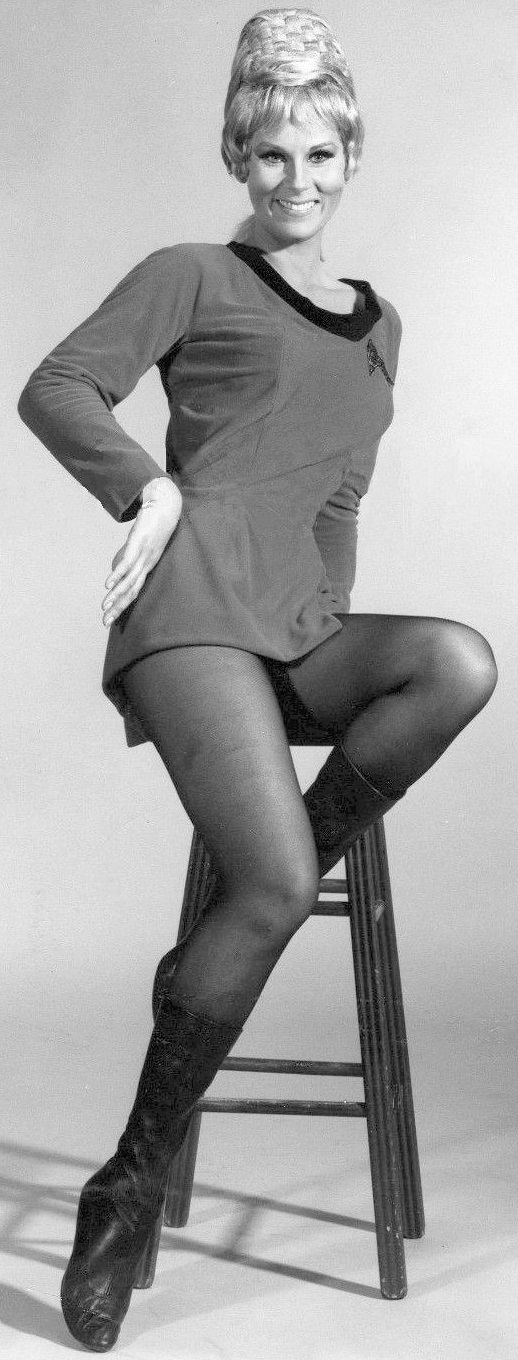
Janice Rand (Grace Lee Whitney) in miniskirt uniform

The original uniform material was velour. This was used in the first and second seasons because it was cheap and easy to care for, and had an attractive sheen under the set lighting. However, it shrank after it was dry-cleaned, and it tore easily. It was replaced in the third season by a doubleknit nylon fabric used in professional baseball uniforms. Differently colored shirts were worn, and charcoal slacks – which appeared black on camera – by the men.

Although women wore trousers in the pilots, most female Starfleet personnel wear more revealing costumes per request from NBC; Grace Lee Whitney suggested miniskirts. William Shatner observed that Star Trek, "to the appreciation of all the men on the set, in fact all around the world, would boast the shortest skirts on women of any regular series on television". Miniskirt-length dresses (of the same materials and colors as the shirts) with cheer briefs and dark tights were worn by the women. Black boots were worn by both sexes. Nichelle Nichols did not consider the miniskirts unusually short or revealing:

I was wearing them on the street. What's wrong with wearing them on the air? I wore 'em on airplanes. It was the era of the miniskirt. Everybody wore miniskirts.

Once the series went into production, use of the jackets on landing parties stopped, even in inclement weather (e.g. "Mudd's Women").

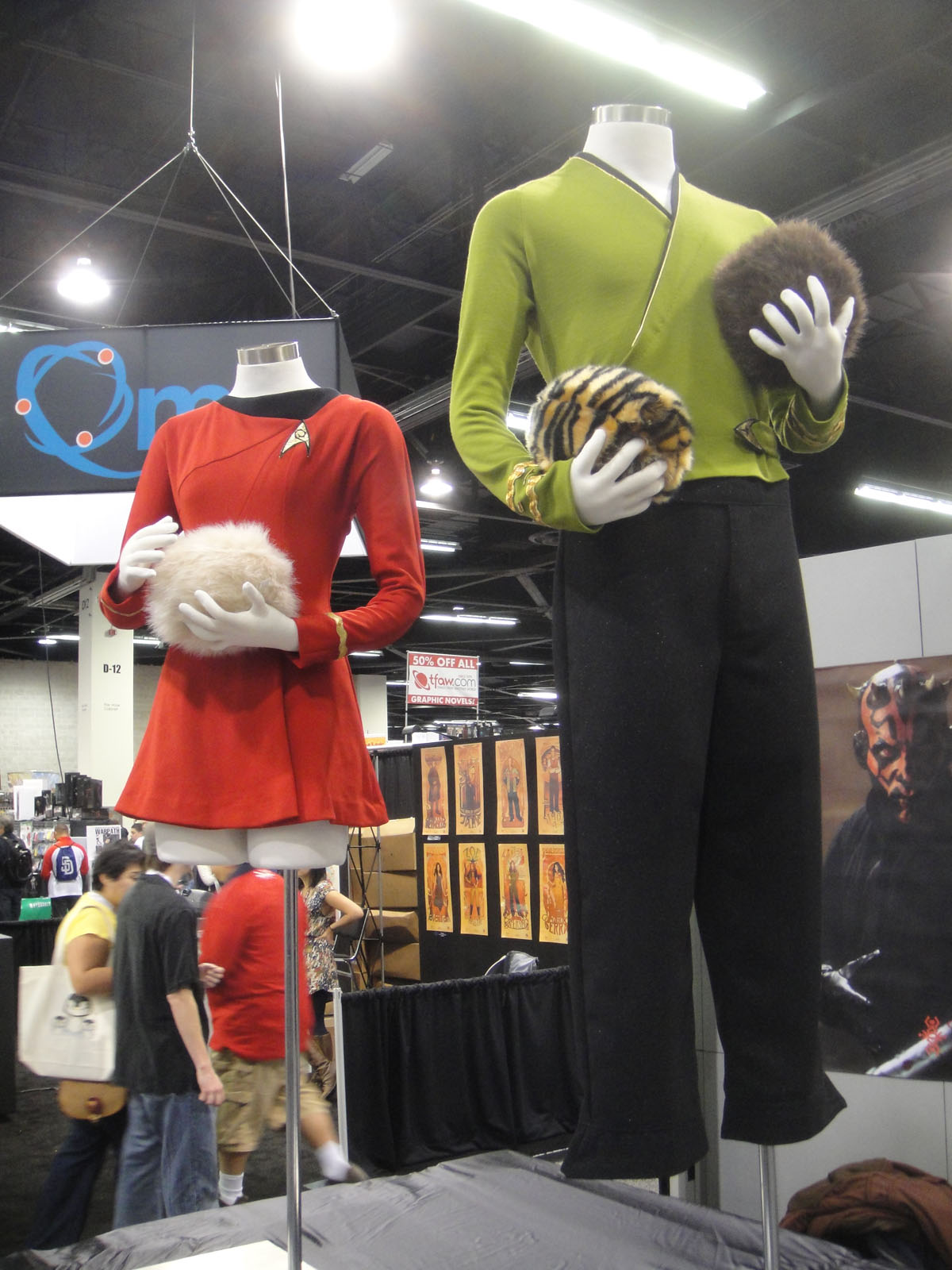
Lt. Uhura's red uniform and Captain Kirk's green shirt uniforms from the Original Series

On certain occasions, the characters would wear dress uniforms (TOS: first shown in "The Menagerie" and later used in "Court Martial", "Space Seed", "Journey to Babel", and "The Savage Curtain") that are made of a shinier fabric, apparently a polyester satin, and decorated with gold piping and colored badges varying according to rank. Montgomery Scott's dress uniform, especially as seen in "The Savage Curtain", includes a Scottish tartan – specifically, the tartan of the Clan Scott, one of Scotland's oldest clans. Jumpsuits in the same colors with black undershirts were also worn, mostly by background characters.

==== Shirt colors ====
Beginning with the first production episode "The Corbomite Maneuver", the department colors were slightly altered from the pilot versions: command and helm personnel wear gold shirts; operations, engineering and security personnel wear red; and science and medical personnel wear blue, all with black collars and undershirts. (Note: "The Man Trap") The most commonly used Command Section shirts were actually chartreuse-green in color, but they appeared to be a golden-yellow color both under the lights used on the set and in the post-development film stock. In later series, the gold color was canonized in dialog. However, some uniforms – the alternate shirts worn by Captain Kirk, and the Command Section dress uniforms – were made of a different material which, while the same color, showed up as chartreuse-green even under the lights and when photographed. (Note: "The Cage" and "Where No Man Has Gone Before") The green shirts (seen in TOS: "The Trouble with Tribbles", "Charlie X", and "The Immunity Syndrome") may have the rank stripes on the sleeves or on the collar (TOS: "The Enemy Within"), and always feature the Enterprise assignment patch near the waist as a belt fastener.

== Rank and insignia ==
The production rank system worked out by series creator Gene Roddenberry and costume designer Bill Theiss resembles that of the United States Navy, in contrast to other science fiction franchises that use an army ranking system. In Star Trek: The Original Series (TOS) and Star Trek: The Motion Picture, ranks are indicated by sleeve stripes. While these were originally planned to follow the U.S. Navy and Coast Guard model, the pattern was modified to avoid an overly flashy or militaristic look by removing one stripe from each Starfleet rank. Thus: a Commodore, when seen, wears a wide gold braid with a gold stripe above and below; a captain's insignia resembles that of a naval lieutenant commander (two and a half stripes); a commander's resembles a naval lieutenant (two stripes); a lieutenant commander's resembles a naval lieutenant (junior grade) (LtJG) (one and a half stripes); a lieutenant's resembles a naval ensign (one stripe), and an ensign wears no sleeve stripes. The LtJG rank was used once in TOS in the episode "Naked Time" (though there have been references to "sub-lieutenants" in subsequent works). Also, there was no distinction made between ensigns and non-commissioned officers or enlisted crew members in TOS; everyone below the rank of lieutenant was presumed to be an ensign. (This was later determined to be unrealistic when the movies were made and thus was reversed.)

In later movies based on The Original Series, ranks are indicated by pins on a shoulder strap and the left sleeve. These are unique symbols for each rank like those worn universally by officers in all branches of the U.S. Armed Forces.

In most franchise television series, ranks are indicated by varying numbers of gold or black dots ("pips") or bars worn on the uniform collar. These more closely follow the naval officer pattern, with gold pips equating to a whole stripe and black pips equating to a half stripe.

=== Service insignia ===
Six duty insignia were defined for TOS:

==== Starship duty ====
The delta insignia, indicative of duty aboard Starfleet starships. This version bears an elongated star to designate the command division.

Theiss designed a shield-shaped badge in 1964 which he called the "arrowhead", with input from Roddenberry. This came to be known as the Star Trek delta insignia, and has since become symbolic of the Starship Enterprise and the entire Star Trek franchise. Roddenberry's intent was that personnel of all starfleet starships would wear this, but in production of the second season episode "The Omega Glory", Theiss mistakenly got the idea that each starship would have a unique insignia, from the fact that some starship officers in an earlier episode "Charlie X" wore a different insignia (see Civilian starship duty). He therefore designed a rectangular insignia worn by the captain and the chief medical officer of the USS Exeter. Shortly before October 7, 2018, a December 18, 1967, memo to Theiss from producer Bob Justman was discovered. Justman noticed the error while reviewing footage and consulted with Roddenberry, who clarified that this indeed was a mistake: all Starfleet starship personnel are to wear the delta insignia as seen on the Enterprise crew uniform. Footage was not reshot to correct the error, but Justman made it clear it was not to be repeated. Going forward, the delta symbol remained consistent for all starship personnel, as seen in "Court Martial" and "The Tholian Web".

This was not publicized, leading to the "unique starship insignia" theory taking hold among fans. Confusion returned to the franchise during production of the Star Trek: Enterprise episode "In a Mirror Darkly", which shows what happened to the lost USS Defiant appearing in the original series episode "The Tholian Web". The Enterprise costume designers designed an insignia for the Defiant, based on the incorrect assumption that universal use of the delta symbol was in honor of the NCC-1701 Enterprise completing its first five-year mission.

In all other Star Trek series and movies, the delta insignia is universal regardless of duty posting.

Starship department insignia

Command department

Science and Medical departments

The delta symbol has a number of variants, based on the ship's department served in:

- Command: Including helm and navigation functions; the basic delta with an elongated star is worn on a gold tunic and the captain's special green tunic.
- Science: The star is replaced with a circle representing a planet with its equator outlined. This is worn on a blue tunic.
- Operations: This includes Engineering, Security, and Communications. The symbol is a six-sided spiral shape. This is worn on a red tunic. A large number of security officers sacrificially die in landing party duty, leading to the meme "redshirt" which is often parodied in other media.
- Medical: Doctors wear the science insignia, and nurses wear the Red Cross, on blue tunics. Doctors occasionally wear scrubs in sick bay.

There were slight variations in the delta insignia among the two pilots and production. In the first pilot, all delta insignia were bordered in gold; this changed to black for the second pilot and subsequent productions. Also, in the pilots, the science and operations symbols were switched (spiral for science and planet circle for operations).

==== Civilian ship duty ====
The early first season episode "Charlie X" shows the captain and first officer of the Antares wearing a differently shaped insignia. As Roddenberry clarified this was due to their service on a civilian (merchant marine) vessel, but led to Theiss' mistaken idea that every starship had a unique insignia.

==== Fleet command ====
Commodore Matt Decker is seen in the second season episode "The Doomsday Machine", wearing a pretzel-shaped insignia. This designates Decker's rare status as a flag officer in command of a single starship, the USS Constellation. This likely added to the confusion of the "unique starship insignia" theory.

==== Starbase duty ====
This insignia is a gold-colored stylized representation of an evening starflower; this is mainly seen worn by commodores, admirals, JAG personnel, and support staff in episodes revolving around courts-martial such as Spock's in "The Menagerie" and Kirk's in "Court Martial".

==== Outpost duty ====
A gold spikelet on a black background is worn by persons on special duty posted in the Federation frontier. These are second only to the security redshirts as "cannon fodder".

==== Cadet duty ====
Starfleet Academy cadets wear a smaller, pewter-colored version of the Evening Starflower worn by Starbase personnel. A simulacrum of Kirk's academy rival and bully Finnegan is seen wearing it in "Shore Leave (Star Trek: The Original Series)".

=== Star Trek: The Animated Series ===
Based on the success and increasing popularity of Star Trek in syndication, an animated version of the series was produced from 1973 to 1974. The uniforms depicted in this series matched the general parameters and appearance of those used in the live action series. The perception by fans of the command uniforms being yellow/gold instead of green, thanks to set lighting and other factors, resulted in the producers committing to a definitive gold-color for animation purposes. The command dress uniforms remained green to match the perceived colors represented by the live action series. However, the uniform pants were colored gray to match the actual fabric used in the live action series as opposed to the black they had appeared to be when filmed.

== Original film franchise ==
The original plans for the aborted Star Trek: Phase II television series involved retaining TOS uniforms but when the project became Star Trek: The Motion Picture, they were replaced with a new design by Robert Fletcher, because, according to Susan Sackett and Gene Roddenberry in The Making of Star Trek: The Motion Picture, the bright colors of the 1960s original, so vibrant on television, would distract viewer attention on the big screen.

=== Star Trek: The Motion Picture ===
The film has multiple uniform styles, including one-piece jumpsuits, matching shirt and pants, and tunics either with buttons or a sash around the waist. All uniform variants include shoes ("foot coverings") built into the trousers. Some uniforms have short sleeves, while others are long-sleeved, with either standing, v-neck, or turnover collars. Uniforms come in gray, white, gray and white, blue, brown, and beige.

The Star Trek delta still remains the symbol for all Enterprise staff members, but the science department's planetary circle and the operations 6-sided spiral are discontinued, replaced with the elongated star. Divisions or section assignments are indicated by a colored circle behind the delta, rather than the uniform color itself: red is for engineering, pale green for medical, orange for science, white for command, pale gold for operations, and gray for security.

Most of the uniforms in the first movie also included a personal scanner ("perscan") medical monitoring device in the position where one would expect to see a belt buckle. This is mentioned in the Roddenberry's novelization of The Motion Picture.

Rank is indicated by stripes on long sleeves as per TOS, but now shoulder board stripes are employed when there are no long sleeves. Also, ensigns are now given a dotted braid (half stripe). Non-commissioned officers wear a hollow gold square on the shoulder boards but not at the sleeves. New rank insignia for admirals are shown, in the shape of three solid braids side-by-side, followed by another solid braid on its own, with an 8-pointed star on shoulder boards. The number of stripes was kept lower than on U.S. Navy uniforms to avoid an overly militaristic look as per TOS, reflecting Roddenberry's insistence that the role of Starfleet was expressly non-military.

Security guards (non-commissioned personnel) wear white uniforms with brown helmets and breastplates. Engineering personnel (commissioned and non-commissioned) wear white pressure suits with large black ribbed collars.

The new officers' uniform designs proved unpopular with the regular cast, and when Harve Bennett took over as producer of the second motion picture, he ordered another redesign because he did not want "an all-gray crew on an all-gray ship."

=== The Wrath of Khan through Star Trek Generations ===
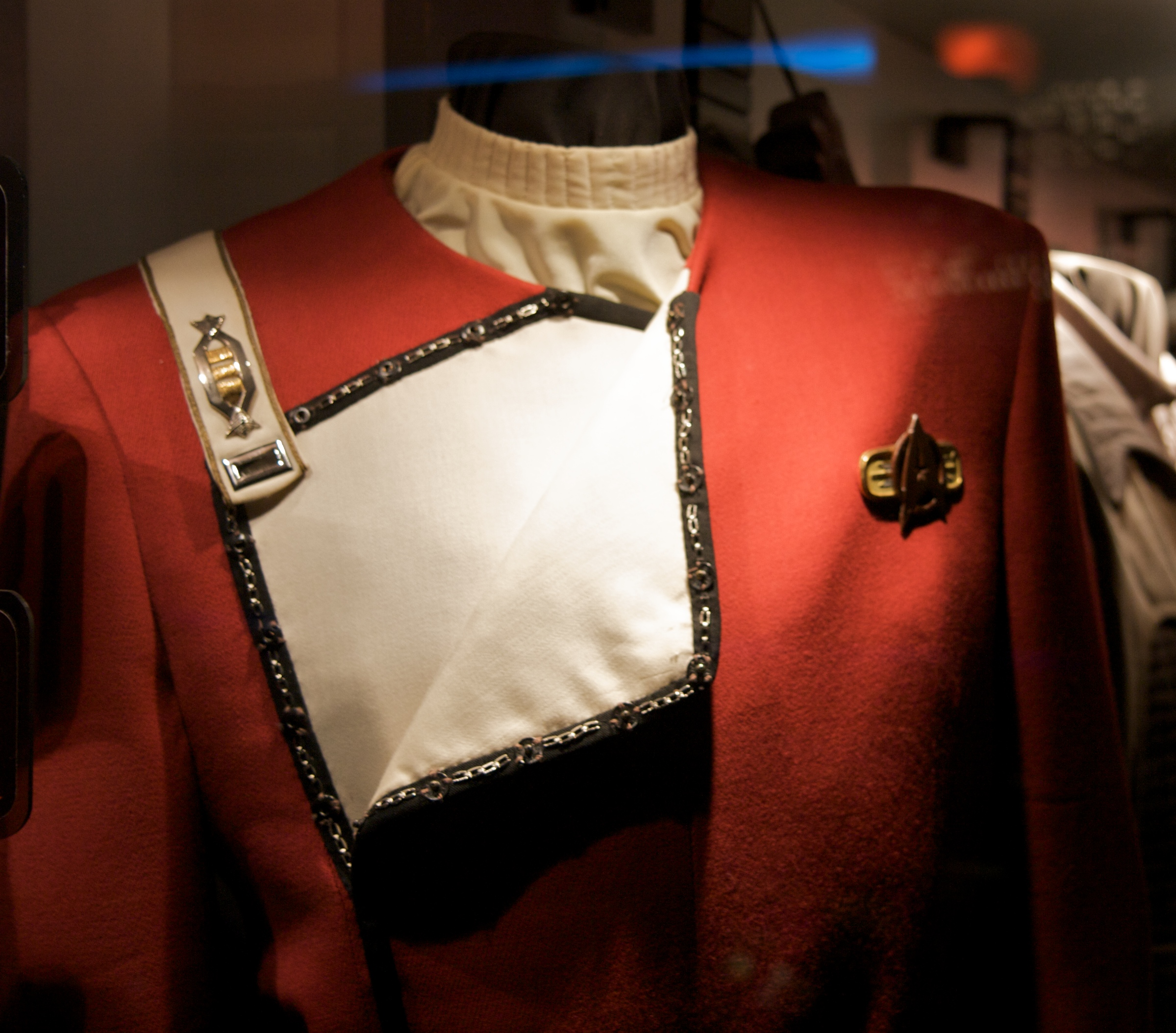
Uniform exemplar from The Wrath of Khan on display at Star Trek: The Experience

Fletcher redesigned the costumes for Star Trek II: The Wrath of Khan. This design is used in the following movies, up to Star Trek Generations, and variations appear in some flashback scenes of Star Trek: The Next Generation and Star Trek: Voyager. In this version, Starfleet officers wear rank insignia on the shoulder strap and left sleeve just above the armband. A service bar is worn just below the sleeve rank pin, denoting how long the officer has served in Starfleet in five-year and ten-year increments.

The second movie-era uniform consists of a burgundy ("blood") double-breasted jacket with a black stripe along a sealing mechanism (admirals also had smaller gold stripes below, the number depending on rank), with a colored strap over the right shoulder to close the tunic, attached to which is a rank pin. All uniforms include the command star arrowhead insignia from TOS, now adopted as the Starfleet emblem, on the left chest; officers have a stylized gold rectangular piece behind the arrowhead, while enlisted personnel do not. Characters also wear a black belt with a buckle shaped like the Starfleet arrowhead in a circle, all in gold, complete with TOS command star.

Departments are indicated by the color of the shoulder strap, arm band, and undershirt, rather than insignia. The colors include white for command; gold for engineering; gray for science, communications and navigation; dark green for security; light green for medical; dark blue for operations; light blue for special services; and red for low-grade officers and officer cadets. All officer uniforms have a division colored stripe on the trousers or skirt seams that matches the shoulder strap and service bar, except for command branch, where the stripes are red, rather than white. Instead of the foot coverings built into the trousers, this uniform design had black boots whose uppers were eight or ten inches high. This costume was nicknamed "The Monster Maroon" uniform because of the difficulty fans often encountered duplicating it.

The Starfleet insignia as seen in the second through seventh Star Trek films

An alternate "bomber" jacket was worn by Kirk and Scott, as well as Admiral Morrow (Star Trek III: The Search for Spock, Star Trek IV: The Voyage Home, Star Trek V: The Final Frontier). In later years Scotty would often remove the jacket altogether, simply wearing a black vest, with numerous pockets useful for an engineer, with his undershirt. Scotty's undershirt itself is inconsistent – he wears a white shirt (consistent with his rank of Captain) with the vest or bomber, but a gold one (used by Engineering crew) with his formal duty tunic.

Security and engineering personnel wear armor and radiation suits respectively, similar to those worn in The Motion Picture, although security guards wear a red, turtle-necked uniform underneath (Star Trek VI: The Undiscovered Country). The engineering radiation suits have a colored collar (Star Trek II): black indicates officer, red indicates cadet. There is also a field jacket for away missions with several large pockets, arm patches, white ribbing and a large white turnover collar. Starfleet cadets in The Wrath of Khan wear the same uniforms as officers, but with bright red undershirts and a red shoulder strap instead of one indicating department.

Enlisted personnel wear a one-piece red jumpsuit in a similar color to the officer uniform, with tan shoulders and upper chest and black undershirts. Enlisted trainees wear the same uniform, except with a red undershirt instead of a black one. (Star Trek II).

Uniforms similar to the officer style are shown in the Next Generation television series, although without the turtleneck (either replacing it with a crew neck, or no undershirt at all) or belt, and sometimes with the TNG-era combadge replacing the Starfleet badge (TNG: "Yesterday's Enterprise", "Dark Page", "Family, "Violations"). Enlisted uniforms kept their turtleneck undershirts. An updated, but almost identical version of this uniform is also worn by an alternate universe future Captain Pike in season 1 episode 10 of Star Trek: Strange New Worlds ("A Quality of Mercy").

== The Next Generation ==
=== Star Trek: The Next Generation ===
The Starfleet officers and crewmembers seen in The Next Generation wear a jumpsuit with a Starfleet communicator badge (or 'combadge' as it was sometimes called) on the left chest and rank insignia on the right side of the collar. The black areas are seen on the shoulders and the pants, and the uniforms's sleeves and abdominal area are colored to indicate the individual's division, with red indicating command and helm; gold for engineering, security, and operations; and blue for science and medical (TNG: "Encounter at Farpoint"). The division colors for command and operations switched from those used in Enterprise and TOS while the division color for science stayed the same. In early episodes some crew members can be seen wearing a tunic version of the uniform with bare legs and boots ("skant").

Beverly Crusher often wears a blue laboratory coat over her standard uniform, beginning in TNG: "The Naked Now." The lab coat was used extensively to hide Gates McFadden's pregnancy in the fourth season. The blue tended to appear teal under certain lighting conditions in the later seasons and subsequent spinoffs. In some episodes of the later seasons, starting in TNG: "Darmok", Jean-Luc Picard would sometimes wear a different uniform that consisted of a gray shirt with black ribbed shoulders and collar with a "bomber jacket" that was red overall with black ribbed shoulders, often worn open or very loosely fastened. The uniforms could be fitted with pouches for carrying tricorders and Type 2 phasers on the waist, and the early versions had a small pocket built in on the left side of the waist for carrying a smaller Type 1 phaser when appearing openly armed was not desired. The removable gear pouches were also incorporated into the uniforms used in DS9 and the TNG-era films from First Contact onward.

We hated our space suits. There were no pockets in them. As much as they call it a stretch fabric, spandex in that configuration doesn't give all that much. It hid nothing.

— LeVar Burton, on the first two seasons' uniforms

In the show's early seasons the uniforms were one-piece jumpsuits made of Spandex, and sized slightly too small so that they would be stretched when worn and provide a smooth appearance. But the cast members hated the uniform's painfully tight fit and lack of pockets, and after Patrick Stewart's chiropractor warned that they risked permanent injury, the actors persuaded the costumers to gradually replace them with wool uniforms. The wool uniforms, which most main cast members wear from the third season onward, are two-piece (tunic and pants) designs for male crew members and single-piece for female crew members, that lack colored piping on the shoulders and edges of the pant leg cuffs and have a raised collar. The collar of the tunic has a colored piping similar to that of the original diamond-shaped shoulder piping. The spandex uniforms continued to make appearances throughout TNG, usually worn by extras in various scenes. These were later altered to lack the piping on the shoulders and trouser hems and include a raised collar as a cost-cutting measure.

Admirals wore numerous different uniform variations in the early years of TNG; a final design was settled on for all admirals in the sixth season onwards, featuring a jacket with gold piping along a centered front closure, and rank pips (indicating the number of "stars"), in gold squares on either side of the collar.

The TNG dress uniform, which continued to be used in Deep Space Nine and Voyager, is a colored wraparound robe-like coat of a solid division color, save for black shoulders. The edges of the coats are piped in silver for field officers and in gold for flag officers. For the first few seasons of TNG, this coat was knee-length and had piping all around the edge; in later seasons, as well as DS9 and Voyager, the coat was shortened to just above the thighs, and the piping was removed from the side.

Other uniform designs appeared briefly in individual episodes, always following the theme of a colored or differentiated shoulder yoke. Examples include cadet uniforms in several episodes (including "The First Duty"). Wesley Crusher's 'Acting Ensign' gray costume was never specifically identified as a uniform, but it also exhibited a shoulder yoke design.

Theiss, the costume designer from the original series, returned to design the initial TNG uniforms; they marked his last contribution to Star Trek wardrobe before he died. The costumes adopted from season 3 onward and later series' costumes were designed by Robert Blackman.

TNG, DS9, Voyager captain insignia

During all the shows set in the 24th century, a consistent insignia scheme is used for officers: a series of gold pips, either a solid color or an outline, worn on the right collar. After the first season of Star Trek: The Next Generation, a consistent scheme is also used for admiral insignia: a series of gold circles inside a black rectangle with a gold border worn on both collars.

For the first season of TNG, admirals wear a different insignia, consisting of a triangle or stripe resembling gold weave along the right collar; one or two gold pips are sometimes underneath the weave. Three variants are visible in "Conspiracy": Admiral Quinn's insignia has no pips, Admiral Savar's has one, and Admiral Aaron's has two.

A Starfleet insignia is worn on the left breast: this also functions as a communicator badge. This combadge insignia was redesigned for the movie Star Trek Generations (the only surviving part of a planned redesign of the uniforms), replacing the oval with a trapezoid with a cutout oval in the center. This new combadge is also used in Star Trek: Deep Space Nine from season three onward, and in Star Trek: Voyager.

Cadet ranks are rarely ever seen, with the exception of the various visits from Wesley Crusher to the Enterprise in TNG. As it appears in those instances, it can be surmised that the insignia of a Cadet consists of one, two, three, or four copper and black bars, similar to those of a modern Lieutenant in the United States Army. It can also be surmised that if a cadet has one bar, he has one year at the academy, two bars for two years, and so on.

Enlisted ranks are seen even less; their insignia are unclear.

=== Star Trek: Deep Space Nine ===
Deep Space Nine introduced a new style of uniform that appeared to run in parallel to the one seen on TNG. The new uniform comprised a single two-piece open-necked jumpsuit with the colored and black areas of the TNG uniform reversed (black torso/sleeves/pants and colored shoulders) with the upper part being a removable jacket along with a visible zipper, resembling the TNG cadet uniforms. The division colors use the same TNG scheme, though the science division is now blue-green. A grayish-indigo mock turtleneck undershirt was added, to which rank pips are affixed. Miles O'Brien (who is the first character to wear the DS9 uniform) is the only character in the series to have the sleeves of the uniform rolled up. The characters of Major Kira and Odo did not wear Starfleet uniforms, as they were part of the Bajoran militia. Throughout the run of DS9, ship-based Starfleet personnel continue to wear the older uniform design. Sisko also wore the TNG uniform on certain formal occasions, during his first arrival at DS9 (in the series pilot episode, "Emissary"), and when he was temporarily given the duties of "Head of Security" for Starfleet Headquarters on Earth (in the Season 4 episode, "Paradise Lost"). Admirals also retained the TNG style. A uniform similar to that appearing in the DS9 series can be seen in the TNG Season 3 episode "Allegiance", worn by the alien masquerading as a Starfleet cadet. The DS9 uniforms were first used in the premiere episode, "Emissary" and would continued to be used up to the Season 5 episode, "The Ascent".

Following the release of Star Trek: First Contact, the new gray movie uniform design also appeared in DS9's fifth season and for the remainder of the series. However, the old DS9 uniform appears four more times following the introduction of the movie gray uniform design in the Season 5 episodes, "In Purgatory's Shadow" and "By Inferno's Light" worn by the real Dr. Julian Bashir while still being trapped in the Internment Camp 371 as well as the Season 7 episode, "Field of Fire" in a photograph and in the flashback scenes of the series finale, "What You Leave Behind".

=== Star Trek Generations ===
New uniforms were designed and made for the film Star Trek Generations, but were abandoned at the last minute. These included a fastening on the right side of the chest and a slightly more militaristic approach with rank bandings on the sleeves (similar to the TOS uniforms), a colored collar, and the lack of a black "W" shape on the abdomen. On the abandoned costumes for the female crew-members, instead of the additional fastening, there was a higher black band around the waist. Despite their not appearing in the film, Playmates Toys released a number of action figures wearing these planned uniforms. Generations instead has the crew wearing both TNG and DS9 uniforms, sometimes in the same scene (for instance, Worf and Riker in the battle against the Duras Sisters' Bird of Prey or Data and Geordi scanning the Amargosa Observatory for trilithium), as there was only enough time to make DS9-style costumes to fit on Patrick Stewart and Brent Spiner, so Jonathan Frakes and LeVar Burton had to borrow Avery Brooks and Colm Meaney's costumes, respectively. Neither borrowed costume fit very well, as Brooks' costume was too small on Frakes, which resulted in the sleeves being rolled up (similar to Miles O'Brien's on Deep Space Nine), and Meaney's costume looked too big on Burton. Picard, Riker, Data and LaForge are the only four characters in the TNG crew to wear the DS9 uniform in the film. Picard wears a black belt around the waist with the DS9 uniform. Worf is the only male member of the TNG crew to not wear the DS9 uniform in the film, although he would later join the Deep Space Nine crew in the show's fourth season. None of the female characters, except Nurse Alyssa Ogawa, wear the DS9 uniform in the film.

As the film progresses, some characters alternate between the TNG and DS9 uniforms and sometimes switch back to the old TNG uniforms (for instance, Picard switches back to the TNG uniform in the film's last scene).

The new style combadge (with the previous gold oval background replaced by a rectangular gold background with a cutout in the center) was also introduced for all uniform types. This combadge was subsequently adopted for DS9 at the beginning of its third season and for Voyager.

=== Star Trek: Voyager ===
The crew in Star Trek: Voyager use the same uniforms seen in the early episodes of Deep Space Nine throughout the show's run. Because they were stuck in the Delta Quadrant and out of contact with Starfleet, the Voyager crew never made the switch to the updated uniform seen in later DS9 episodes and in the last three TNG films; they continued to use the old DS9 uniforms, although in the episode "Message in a Bottle" the EMH mark II is wearing the later DS9/movie gray TNG uniform. Starfleet personnel back in the Alpha Quadrant are seen wearing this uniform in later seasons of the show as well, when Voyager reestablishes contact with home. The crew also wears the TNG-style dress uniforms (VOY: "Course: Oblivion", "Someone to Watch Over Me", "One Small Step", "Ashes to Ashes").

B'Elanna Torres is sometimes seen wearing an overcoat over her normal uniform which matches the colors of her normal uniform, but has a pocket on the right breast for carrying small tools. The jacket was added to help conceal actress Roxann Dawson's pregnancy in the fourth season. She wore it again during the character's pregnancy in the seventh season, beginning in the episode "Q2".

Voyager provisional Captain insignia

Voyager used the new-style combadge and introduced 'provisional' rank insignia which consisted of a gold-metal-bordered enamel oval in the crewman's Branch color with diagonal black or gold bars to signify rank instead of the traditional pips. Provisional ranks were worn by the Maquis members of Voyager's crew, as they were ineligible to wear official Starfleet ranks. All ranks up to Captain appeared on screen; The Star Trek Encyclopedia showed them all to be analogous to the normal rank system. A black diagonal bar is equal to a black pip and a gold diagonal bar is equal to a gold pip. (e.g.: a yellow-enamel oval with one black bar and two gold bars signifies a Lieutenant-Commander in Operations, which is normally signified by one black pip and two gold pips.)

The crew aboard the USS Equinox also use the same uniforms seen in the early episodes of Deep Space Nine as they are also stuck in the Delta Quadrant and out of contact with Starfleet (VOY: "Equinox (Parts I and II)").

The 29th-century officers in the Star Trek: Voyager episode "Relativity" wear chevron-like collar insignia (worn in a horizontal line like the pips and oriented pointing forwards towards the collar). Captain Braxton wears four gold chevrons (equivalent to four gold pips) and Lieutenant Ducane wears two gold chevrons (equivalent to two gold pips). The new Starfleet insignia is a silver diamond shape inset with a gold "Arrowhead" symbol facing to the left; this is probably a combination communicator and temporal beacon. The tunics have a quilted fabric in branch color on the right shoulder and sleeve (Blue for Command, Olive Drab Brown for Operations, and Gray for Sciences) and branch-color piping on the edge of the shoulder yoke.

In "Living Witness", the crew was shown to be wearing black undershirts with a high collar (turtleneck style) instead of the usual grayish-indigo undershirts with a low collar, no combadges or rank insignia, while some were wearing black gloves including Captain Kathryn Janeway. This was in the context of historical records that wrongly asserted that Voyager's crew had acted in a malign manner, until corrected by The Doctor, who was brought back to life 700 years in the future after a "relic" (containing a backup copy of his program) was discovered among wreckage and his program was recovered.

=== Movies from Star Trek: First Contact on and later DS9 seasons ===
Star Trek: First Contact introduces a new uniform style later adopted in DS9 (DS9: "Rapture"). This uniform features a colored turtleneck undertunic (with the same departmental color scheme as in earlier shows) covered by a black jacket with colored bands on the lower sleeves near the cuffs showing the wearer's division, the shoulders and upper chest of which are ribbed and made of thick, violet-gray material. Like the last two uniforms, the communicator badge is worn on the jacket, while rank pins are worn on the undertunic's collar. The pants are black. Star Trek: Insurrection also introduced a new dress uniform, consisting of a white jacket and black pants both with gold trim, a gray ribbed tunic (white tunic for flag officers and captains), and rank insignia on the collar of the tunic with the combadge worn in the customary location on the jacket. Unlike the previous uniform, it was the same color regardless of the wearer's division, save for colored bands on the lower sleeves like the standard uniform. It also appeared in the DS9 episode "Inter Arma Enim Silent Leges". Captains also had the option of a more casual uniform vest of the same basic design, though the violet-gray extended much lower.

As depicted in Insurrection, a new admiral's duty uniform was shown, looking similar to those worn by officers, and yet containing markers to set it apart from the ordinary. The stripes on the jacket cuffs are double the width of those on the officer's jacket, and they show the admiral's rank insignia. The jacket also has gold edging. Furthermore, the admiral's uniform incorporates a belt, whose buckle is either a plain gold rectangle, as seen frequently in DS9, or a gold oval with an image of the United Federation of Planets' Seal, as was the case with Admiral Dougherty from Insurrection.

=== Lower Decks ===
A new uniform is introduced in the animated series Star Trek: Lower Decks in the early 2380s. This uniform is very similar to the version prototyped for Star Trek Generations, but has slight alterations such as a white band between the shoulder area and the body; a simplified badge featuring only the Starfleet arrowhead insignia; a V-shaped tunic front; and colored bands at the tops of the boots corresponding to the division color, echoed in the boots' soles. The division colors still follow the TNG scheme, though the science division is now sky blue rather than blue-green. This uniform is explicitly worn contemporary to the later Deep Space Nine/First Contact uniform.

=== Ancillary uniform ===
Starfleet personnel fighting in ground battles appear in the DS9 episodes "...Nor the Battle to the Strong" and "The Siege of AR-558". They wear one-piece black uniforms with divisional stripes across the chest.

=== Alternative timelines ===
In the TNG episode "All Good Things...", an alternate timeline showed a uniform with the full color shirt (including shoulders). The same colors were used and the rank insignia would be shown above the right breast over a black line which cut off the shoulder area. These uniforms would also make an appearance in the Star Trek: Deep Space Nine episode "The Visitor" and the Star Trek: Voyager episode "Endgame". These episodes also included a new combadge design where the Starfleet arrow was just an outline surrounded by two gold vertical bars. This badge was also worn by Geordi La Forge in the Star Trek: Voyager episode "Timeless" but on the gray shoulder uniform used in the last three TNG movies and the later episodes of Deep Space Nine.

The Star Trek: The Next Generation episode "Parallels" used an alternate combadge design where rank was denoted by the number of bars behind the arrowhead.

Variations in uniforms and insignia are occasionally used as plot devices in the various series. In the episode "Future Imperfect", the insignia are slightly altered so as to convince a character that 16 years have passed. In the episode, "Parallels", variations in uniforms and insignia suggest a meeting of characters from different parallel universes.

== Prequel era ==
=== Star Trek: Enterprise ===
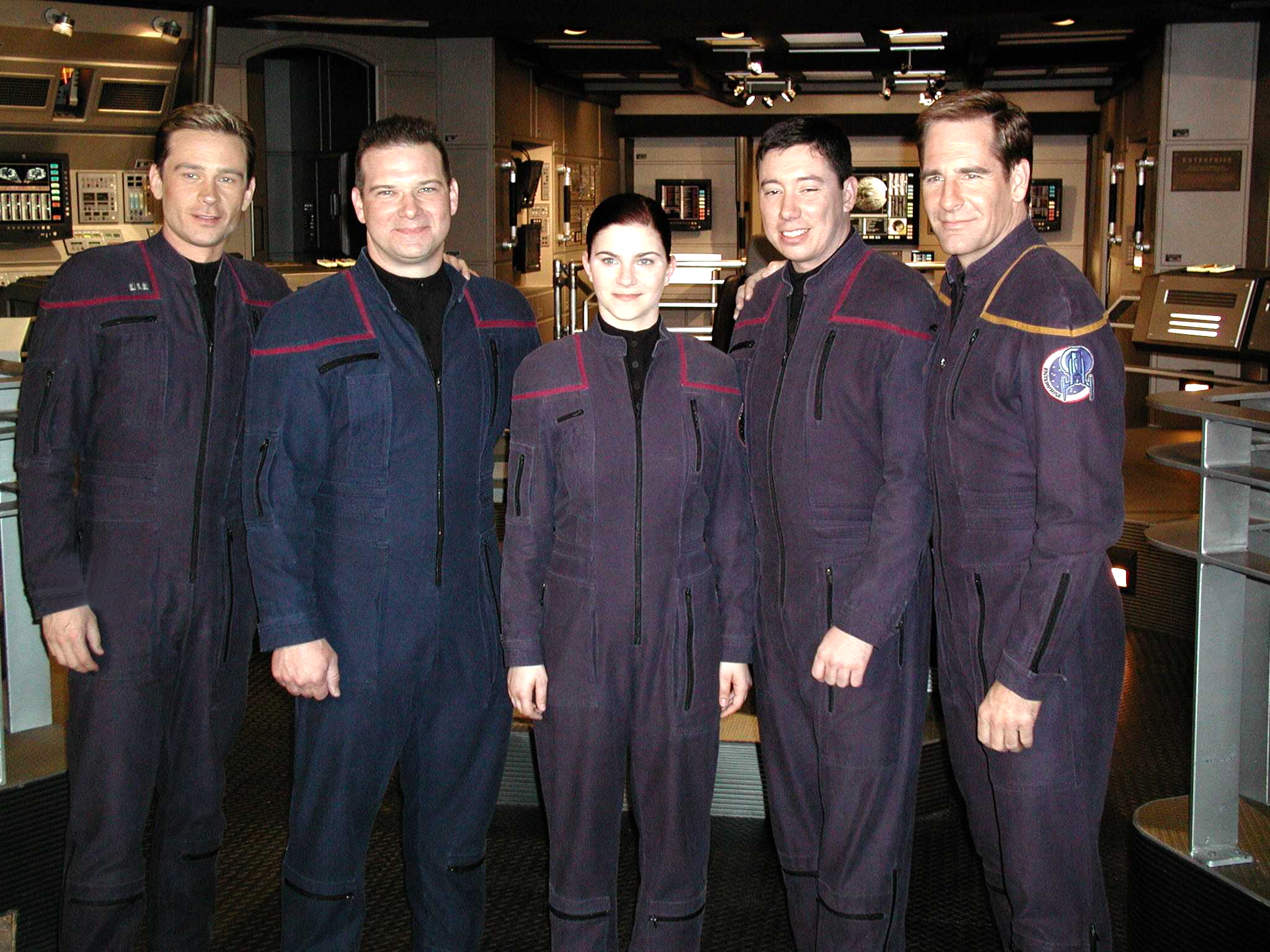
Sailors of the Year for the year 2001 in Enterprise uniforms with members of the cast. Photo courtesy of US Navy

In Enterprise, field officers and crewmembers wear duty uniforms consisting of a dark long-sleeved undershirt and blue jumpsuit with colored piping around the shoulders and, occasionally, baseball caps. There is also a desert uniform with khaki pants and white shirt. Both uniforms have a United Earth Starfleet patch (featuring the stylized arrowhead emblem) on the right upper arm, and a patch left upper arm denoting the ship one is serving on. Enterprise, set before all other incarnations, did not include characters who hold the ranks of lieutenant commander or lieutenant, junior grade. The highest-ranking admiral seen wears two sets of three-pip insignia.

Division colors follow the original TOS scheme, with command and flight control officers wearing gold piping, engineering, communications, and security officers wearing red piping, and medical and science officers (including linguists) wearing blue piping. Throughout the series, men and women wear the same type of uniform. Unlike the other series' uniforms, standard uniforms on Enterprise include zip-up pockets, and the undershirt is buttoned at the neck – while Gene Roddenberry had explicitly forbidden such devices as buttons and zippers on Starfleet uniforms, believing they would be obsolete in the future, designer Bob Blackman consciously used them as a way of dating the series, implying that closures Roddenberry envisioned had not been invented yet. Blackman described the jumpsuits as "more like a NASA flight suit" than the previous Starfleet costumes, and actors from other Star Trek shows envied the Enterprise actors' much more comfortable and conventional outfits.

Admirals wear a navy-blue jumpsuit-like uniform, open to show a white shirt and navy tie. The jacket has similar piping style to the regular uniform, but with the color in red and white. The sleeve jacket also features silver braiding at the cuffs. Admirals' insignia consists of a series of squares (similar to those worn by officers) on a navy-blue patch with silver border, the number of squares matching rank in the same manner as TNG-onwards admirals; two sets of insignia are worn, one on each side of the chest.

On certain occasions, Enterprise characters wear dress uniforms similar to the blue jumpsuit, decorated with the same pattern of colored piping, but lacking the zip-up pockets and combined with a white long-sleeved undershirt and, sometimes depending on rank, a white tie.

Rank insignia on duty uniforms are worn on right side of shoulders only, but rank insignia on dress uniforms are worn on both sides.

Also, there are two different kinds of field jackets worn on away missions. They have zippered pockets and the same colored pipings as the jumpsuits, as well as cold weather gear, pressure suits, spacesuits, an EV undersuit, and a royal blue undergarment with slight differences on male and female garments.

During the series, T'Pol is almost never seen wearing the standard uniform although she is a commissioned officer in Starfleet, and often considered to be the first officer. The only times she wears the uniform is in the episode "Twilight" (featuring an alternate timeline) and briefly (as a disguise) in "Hatchery".

=== Star Trek: Discovery ===
In 2017's Star Trek: Discovery, set ten years prior to Star Trek: The Original Series, the uniform underwent another redesign. Like its Enterprise predecessor, a blue uniform was worn, with a shirt-trouser combination with a single collar on the left side. A large zipper fastens the front of the shirt, and pants pockets have zippers as well. Repeating patterns of tiny delta insignias ran down the sides of the uniforms, its colors denoting the wearer's division. The classic yellow, blue, red combination was eschewed in favor of gold, silver and copper for command, sciences and operations respectively. Ranks were embedded onto the Starfleet Delta, along with gold shoulder stripes for captains and shoulder stripes plus gold shoulder markings for admirals, and following the same standard as Star Trek: The Next Generation style rank insignias.

In later seasons, the uniforms are replaced with red, blue, and yellow uniforms consistent with the Next Generation era, although one officer, lieutenant Rhys, is costumed in yellow despite being the ship's tactical officer.

== Reboot (Kelvin Timeline) films ==
J. J. Abrams' Star Trek series takes place in a parallel universe starting in 2233 (James T. Kirk's birth year), known as the "Kelvin timeline" for the fact it was created when the late 24th-century Romulan Nero destroyed the USS Kelvin, on which Kirk's parents served. Kirk's father is killed, and Jim Kirk is born in space three months prematurely after his mother is evacuated from the Kelvin.

The uniform design for the reboot basically recreates the original series uniforms, but with some cosmetic changes.

=== Star Trek (2009 film) ===
The delta insignia badge is now a metal pin rather than a sewn-on patch, gold for flag officers and silver for all lower-ranked officers. The shirts are now in two layers: a wide-collared over-shirt color-coded gold, blue, or red for department as in the original series, with a quilted pattern and a colored hem-line from the neck to the armpit; and a black undershirt, visually imitating the black collar of the original TOS design. The over-shirt has the division delta badge shape printed onto the fabric, providing a textured appearance. Rank is indicated by 1 to 4 silver metallic-cloth bands worn above the overshirt's cuffs (1 for lieutenants, 2 for commanders, 3 for captains, and 4 for flag officers).

As in the original series, female officers wear dresses, some with short sleeves (seen on Lt. Uhura), others with long sleeves (as seen on some of the background extras). Also, a number of women onboard can be seen wearing the long sleeve top and pants uniform similar to those worn in "The Cage". Unlike other Trek, this uniform is worn only aboard starships—other personnel wear black one-piece uniforms of a much more "military" appearance. In an unexplained change from previous series, many female crew members wear nail polish (Uhura wears black polish, while many extras wear red).

Dress uniforms for academy cadets and staff are crimson, while flag officers (fleet captains and admirals) use a gray uniform with a white false-plastron front. The design is similar to that in The Motion Picture, stated by designer Michael Kaplan in the book Star Trek: The Art of the Film to be a deliberate homage. Rank is indicated by 1 to 5 paired diamond-shaped silver-metal "pips" worn on the tunic's shoulder-boards (ensigns wear 1 paired pip, lieutenants wear 2 paired pips, commanders wear 3 paired pips, captains wear 4 paired pips, and flag officers wear 5 paired pips). One significant change from TOS is the addition of the peaked cap to the dress uniforms.

=== Star Trek Into Darkness (2013 film) ===
The uniforms in the second reboot film are developed further. The dress uniform for Starfleet officers on the ground is shown to be a mid-gray in color and a similar style to the red uniforms worn by the academy cadets in the first film. A more informal uniform jumpsuit is worn at various points by several characters (including Kirk and Scotty). These jumpsuits have high collars and are made of a dark gray fabric, with triangles of transparent plastic at the collarbones which show the color of the officer's regular uniform shirt beneath.

The personnel on the USS Vengeance wear a different duty uniform from the norm. It consists of black trousers and undershirt, with a quilted blue overshirt with long black sleeves and black cloth epaulets. This might either be the uniform of a private armed security or military contractor company hired by Marcus through Section 31 or the duty uniform for Section 31 itself (the blue indicating its Research & Development wing). Admiral Marcus' rank on this uniform is indicated by a wide silver band over a narrow silver band and under two narrow silver bands on the cuff.

Rank for admirals (as worn by Admiral Alexander Marcus) is indicated by 1 to 5 paired diamond-shaped gold-metal "pips" worn on the flag officer tunic's shoulder-boards. Marcus is described as a fleet Admiral (usually equivalent to a NATO five-star military rank) and wears 5 paired gold pips on his shoulder-boards. There are other ranks mentioned in the movies (Kirk himself is offered the rank of Vice-Admiral in Star Trek: Beyond). If the rank scheme is similar to NATO ranks they would be: commodores wear 1 paired gold pip, Rear Admirals wear 2 paired gold pips, vice-admirals wear 3 paired gold pips, and admirals wear 4 paired gold pips. Alternatively, the rank of fleet captain (a senior grade of captain and brevet flag officer rank) is signified by 5 paired silver pips, and the rank of admiral is always signified by 5 paired gold pips regardless of grade.

== Other publications ==
Some licensed Star Trek publications present some insignia that contradict the ones shown on screen or in other publications. For example, the second and third editions of The Star Trek Encyclopedia offer differing insignia for various Starfleet ranks. Additionally, some Star Trek publications, including officially licensed ones, posit additional ranks that are not seen or mentioned in live-action productions.

== In culture ==
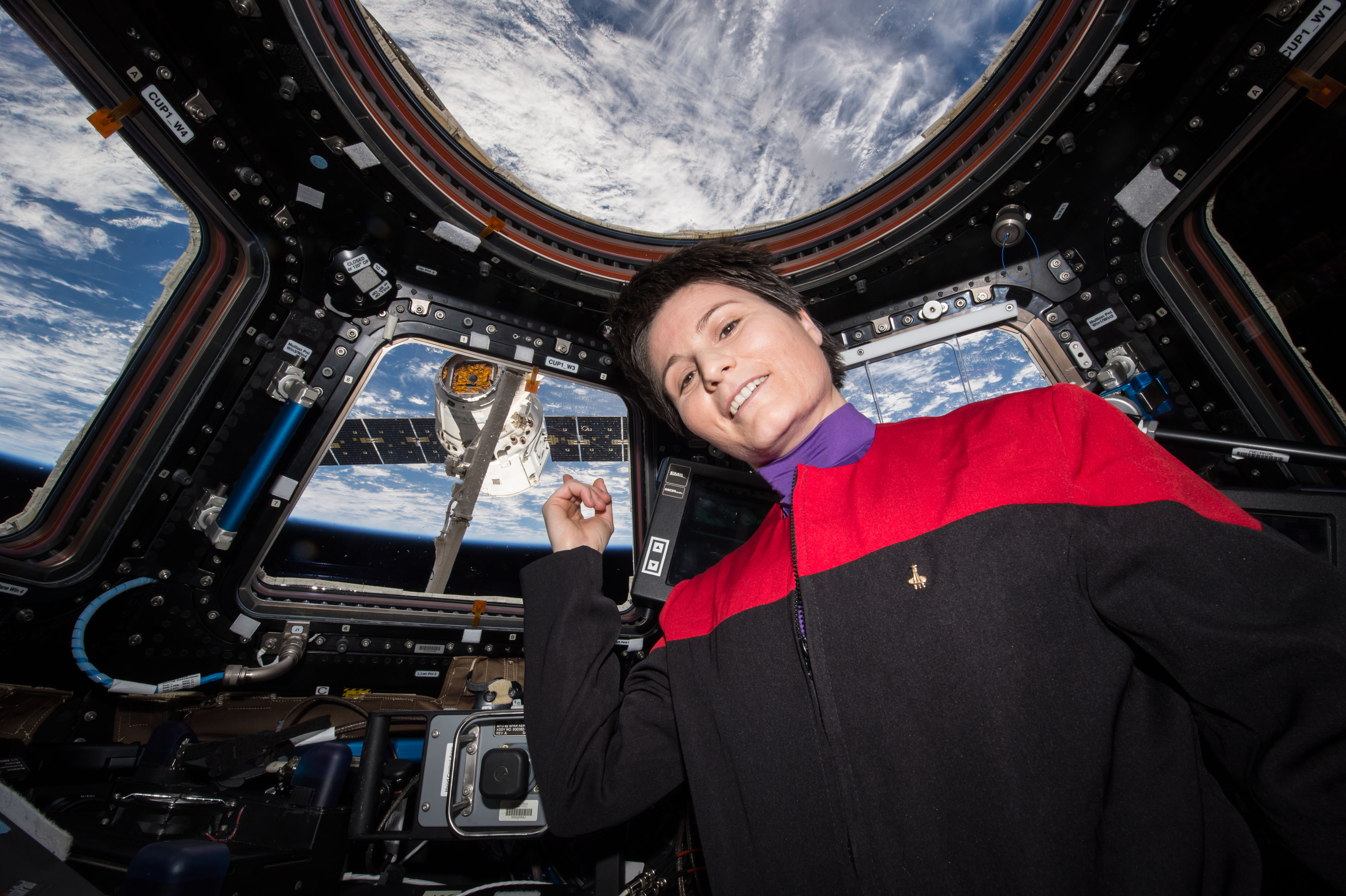
Samantha Cristoforetti in Star Trek uniform inside the ISS Cupola, referencing Captain Janeway looking for coffee

Star Trek uniforms have become with Star Trek as a whole a cultural icon.

== See also ==
- United States Navy officer rank insignia
