= Suzy Snowflake =

1951 Christmas song recorded by Rosemary Clooney

Single by Rosemary Clooney
- A-side: "Little Red Riding Hood's Christmas Tree"
- Published: 1951
- Released: November 16, 1951
- Recorded: May 31, 1951
- Genre: Traditional pop
- Length: 3:01
- Label: Columbia
- Songwriters: Sid Tepper, Roy C. Bennett

"Suzy Snowflake" is a song written by Sid Tepper and Roy C. Bennett, made famous by Rosemary Clooney in 1951 and released as a 78 RPM record by Columbia Records, MJV-123.

Suzy is a snowflake playfully personified. It is commonly regarded as a Christmas song, although it makes no mention of the holiday. The child-oriented lyrics celebrate the fun of winter. According to legend, she is said to be the wife of Jack Frost.

A cartoon short based on the song was made in 1953 by Centaur Productions, with stop-motion animation created by Wah Ming Chang. It is annually shown during the Christmas season on WGN-TV in Chicago and WJAC-TV in Johnstown, Pennsylvania, along with another production by Centaur, Hardrock, Coco and Joe and an early UPA version of Frosty the Snowman.

Clooney later re-recorded the song for her 1978 Mistletoe Records album Christmas with Rosemary Clooney. It has been covered by other artists, most notably Soul Coughing in 1997.

== In other media ==
The character of Susie Snowflake from the Goosebumps franchise, who first appeared in the book More & More & More Tales to Give You Goosebumps and later the mobile game Goosebumps: Horror Town, is named after this titular song.

== See also ==
- List of Christmas/holiday hit singles in the United States
- Yuki-onna
