= Tricorder =

Fictional device

- Star Trek franchise element
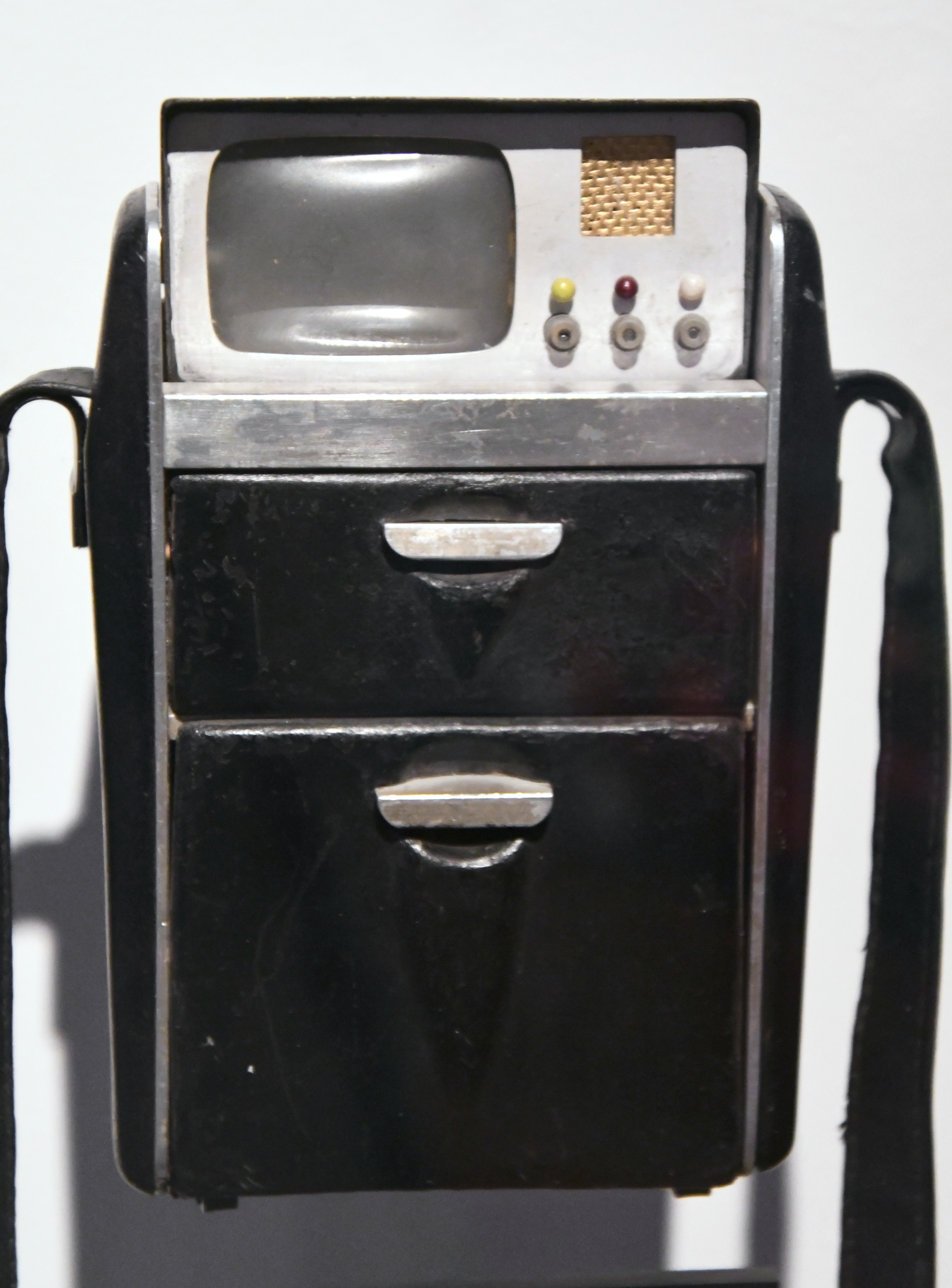
- Tricorder from the original series
- First appearance: Star Trek: The Original Series
- Created by: Gene Roddenberry
- Genre: Science fiction

In-universe information
- Type: Sensor
- Affiliation: Starfleet

A tricorder is a fictional handheld sensor that exists in the Star Trek universe. The tricorder is a multifunctional hand-held device that can perform environmental scans, data recording, and data analysis; hence the word "tricorder" to refer to the three functions of sensing, recording, and computing. In Star Trek stories the devices are issued by the fictional Starfleet organization.

The original physical prop for the tricorder was designed by Wah Chang and appeared in "The Man Trap" in 1966, the first Star Trek episode to air.

== Types ==
The tricorder of the 23rd century, as seen in Star Trek: The Original Series, is a black, rectangular device with a top-mounted rotating hood, two opening compartments, and a shoulder strap. The top pivots open, exposing a small screen and control buttons. When closed it resembles a portable tape recorder.

Three main variants appear in shows. The standard tricorder is a general-purpose device used primarily to scout unfamiliar areas, make detailed examination of living things, and record and review technical data. The medical tricorder is used by doctors to help diagnose diseases and collect bodily information about a patient; the key difference between this and a standard tricorder is a detachable hand-held high-resolution scanner stored in a compartment of the tricorder when not in use. The engineering tricorder is fine-tuned for starship engineering purposes. There are also many other lesser-used varieties of special-use tricorders.

The ship's medical variant employs a detachable "sensor probe" stored in the bottom compartment when not in use. The probe, although originally thought to have been fashioned from a spare salt shaker, was actually scratch-built for the show; the conical Danish salt shakers were set dressing, used as laser scalpels.

The 24th-century version of the tricorder introduced in Star Trek: The Next Generation is a small, gray, hand-held model with a flip-out panel to allow for a larger screen. This design was later refined with a slightly more angular appearance that was seen in most Next Generation–era movies as well as later seasons of Star Trek: Deep Space Nine and Voyager. In the post-Next Generation-era (Star Trek: Nemesis and Star Trek: Elite Force II), a newer tricorder was introduced. It is flatter, with a small flap that opens on top and a large touchscreen interface.

== Production ==
The tricorder prop for the original Star Trek series was designed and built by Wah Ming Chang, who created several futuristic props under contract. Some of his designs are considered to have been influential on later, real-world consumer electronics devices. For instance, his communicator inspired cell phone inventor Martin Cooper's desire to create his own form of mobile communication device. Many other companies followed this example and life-sized replicas remain popular collectibles today. The tricorder in The Next Generation was initially inspired by the HP-41C scientific calculator.

== "Real" tricorders ==
Software exists to make hand-held devices simulate a tricorder. Examples include Jeff Jetton's Tricorder for the PalmPilot; the Web application for the Pocket PC, iPhone, and iPod Touch; and an Android version.

Vital Technologies Corporation sold a portable device dubbed the "Official Star-Trek Tricorder Mark 1" (formally, the TR-107 Tricorder Mark 1) in 1996. Its features were an "Electromagnetic Field (EMF) Meter", "Two-Mode Weather Station" (thermometer and barometer), "Colorimeter" (no wavelength given), "Light meter", and "Stardate Clock and Timer" (a clock and timer). Spokespersons claimed the device was a "serious scientific instrument". Vital Technologies marketed the TR-107 as a limited run of 10,000 units before going out of business, although far fewer than 10,000 were likely ever built. The company was permitted to call this device a "tricorder" because Gene Roddenberry's contract included a clause allowing any company able to create functioning technology to use the name.

In February 2007, researchers from Purdue University publicly announced their portable (briefcase-sized) DESI-based mass spectrometer, the Mini-10, which can be used to analyze compounds in ambient conditions without prior sample preparation. This was also announced as a "tricorder".

In March 2008, British biotech company QuantuMDx was founded to develop the world's first handheld DNA lab, a molecular diagnostic point-of-care device which will provide disease diagnosis in under 15 minutes. In March 2014, the company launched a crowdfunding campaign to support clinical trials of the device and to name it. Contributors and members of the public called for the device to be officially named a "Tricorder".

In May 2008, researchers from Georgia Tech publicly announced their portable hand-held multi-spectral imaging device, which aids in the assessment of the severity of an injury under the skin, including the detection of pressure ulcers, regardless of lighting conditions or skin pigmentation. The day after the announcement, technology websites, including Inside Tech and The Future of Things, began comparing this device to the Star Trek tricorder.

On May 10, 2011, the X Prize Foundation partnered with Qualcomm Incorporated to announce the Tricorder X Prize, a $10 million incentive to develop a mobile device that can diagnose patients as well as or better than a panel of board-certified physicians. On January 12, 2012, the contest was officially opened at the 2012 Consumer Electronics Show in Las Vegas. Early entrants to the competition include two Silicon Valley startups, Scanadu and Senstore, which began work on the medical tricorder in early 2011. Entries included ones from CloudDx and DMI, among others. The winner of the competition was Final Frontier Medical Devices, which is now known as Basil Leaf Technologies.

On August 23, 2011, moonblink's tricorder app for Android was served with a copyright infringement notice by lawyers for CBS and it was deleted from the Android Market by Google. On January 5, 2012, it was put back again as a new app in the Android market, although it is no longer available.

In 2012, cognitive science researcher Dr. Peter Jansen announced having developed a handheld mobile computing device modeled after the design of the tricorder. A version that expanded the original capabilities to include visible spectroscopy, radiation sensing, thermal imaging, and environmental sensing was released as open source hardware in 2014. A subsequent version released in 2026 added radiation spectroscopy and magnetic imaging.

On December 7, 2020, genomics researcher Dr. Michael Schatz and his intern Aspyn Palatnick published a paper on the first mobile app to allow anybody to study DNA virtually anywhere using an iPhone or iPad, which many media outlets dubbed to be a "DNA tricorder."

On February 19, 2022, NASA sent the rHEALTH ONE, a miniature cytometry-based biomedical analyzer, to the International Space Station. This was successfully tested by ESA astronaut Samantha Cristoforetti on May 13 and May 16, 2022. She demonstrated the device's ability to take a small drop of sample (< 10 uL) and perform measurements on samples prepared by NASA to evaluate device performance in a microgravity environment. Over 70 million raw data points were recorded across five detector channels using two lasers over a ~2-minute acquisition period per sample, enabling discrimination of sample populations based on forward scatter (size) and fluorescence intensity across multiple channels.

== Toys and replicas ==
The first mass-produced tricorder replica was featured in AMT's Star Trek Exploration Set in 1974, followed shortly thereafter by a palm-sized version in Remco's 1975 Star Trek Utility Belt which was sized and marketed to young children in hopes of taking advantage of Star Trek: The Animated Series that was on TV at that time.

The first life-sized tricorder was produced by Mego Corporation in 1976 and was actually a cassette tape player made to look like a tricorder. In the 1990s, Star Trek replicas were mass-produced by Playmates, Playing Mantis, and Master Replicas, making commercially produced replicas affordable to the average fan for the first time. In the 2000s, Art Asylum and later Diamond Select produced prop replicas of the original tricorder.

In April 2025, The Wand Company Ltd. released a working replica of the tricorder, featuring a working LCD screen, authentic sounds and controls, and numerous immersive features. Based on Wah Chang's original design drawing of the tricorder indicating interchangeable discs for data or expanded functions, the replica has removable discs that put the tricorder into multiple functions like Logs, Archive, Audio sensor, Radiation sensor, Orientation (compass), or Status. The Logs section includes "Captain's Log" entries from every episode of the entire original series. The Archive includes recreations of the two conflicting newspapers showing Edith Keeler's fractured timeline in "The City on the Edge of Forever." It also includes stills of Wah Chang's Balok mannequin and Romulan stealth Bird of Prey vessel created for the series. The replica includes spacers for the bottom compartment that can hold an accurate medical scanner replica.
