= Aero Theatre Horrorthon =

Annual horror film marathon in Santa Monica, California, US

The Aero Theatre Horrorthon, also known as the Dusk-to-Dawn Horrorthon, is an all-night marathon of six to seven horror films held every October at the Aero Theatre in Santa Monica, California.

== Description ==
The Aero Theatre Horrorthon is an all-night marathon of six to seven horror films (usually projected in 35 mm), as well as free food and giveaways, held at the Aero Theatre in Santa Monica, California. Grant Moninger, the event's organizer, describes it as "going into some kind of absurd church of horror films." The event has spawned a number of original characters, including Corn Gorn (a variation of the Gorn from Star Trek), the unofficial mascot of the festival, and his family, friends, and nemeses. Some patrons have even voted for Corn Gorn in national elections.

== History ==
The first Horrorthon was held at the Aero Theatre in 2006 and has occurred annually ever since. While it is generally held at the Aero in October, the 2008 edition took place on November 1, after a Halloween edition had been hosted the previous night at Grauman's Egyptian Theatre.

In 2020, in light of the temporary closure of movie theaters due to the COVID-19 pandemic, a "home edition" of Horrorthon was offered, where patrons chose their own six-film lineups and were provided with personally customized video introductions and interstitials.

In 2023, for the first time ever, the lineup of films was not announced ahead of time and was revealed throughout the course of the event.

== Films screened ==
2006
Title	Director	Release Year
Night of the Living Dead	George A. Romero	1968
Re-Animator	Stuart Gordon	1985
House by the Cemetery	Lucio Fulci	1981
Castle of Blood	Antonio Margheriti	1964
Pumpkinhead	Stan Winston	1988
Burial Ground	Andrea Bianchi	1981
2007
Title	Director	Release Year
The Return of the Living Dead	Dan O'Bannon	1985
Freaks	Tod Browning	1932
From Beyond	Stuart Gordon	1986
The Beyond	Lucio Fulci	1981
The Last House on the Left	Wes Craven	1972
The Children	Carlton J. Albright	1980
City of the Living Dead	Lucio Fulci	1980
2008
Title	Director	Release Year
Night of the Creeps	Fred Dekker	1986
Texas Chainsaw Massacre 2	Tobe Hooper	1986
Braindead	Peter Jackson	1992
Let's Scare Jessica to Death	John D. Hancock	1971
Demons	Lamberto Bava	1985
Deathdream	Bob Clark	1974
2009
Title	Director	Release Year
The People Under the Stairs	Wes Craven	1991
Day of the Dead	George A. Romero	1985
Society	Brian Yuzna	1989/1992
The Brood	David Cronenberg	1979
Maniac	William Lustig	1980
Terror	Norman J. Warren	1978
2010
Title	Director	Release Year
Fright Night	Tom Holland	1985
Don't Look in the Basement	S.F. Brownrigg	1973
Candyman	Bernard Rose	1992
Bloody Birthday	Ed Hunt	1981
Phantasm	Don Coscarelli	1979
Cemetery Man	Michele Soavi	1994
2011
Title	Director	Release Year
Pet Sematary	Mary Lambert	1989
Tourist Trap	David Schmoeller	1979
The Pit	Lew Lehman	1981
Videodrome	David Cronenberg	1983
Alice Sweet Alice	Alfred Sole	1976
Just Before Dawn	Jeff Lieberman	1981
2012
Title	Director	Release Year
Hellraiser	Clive Barker	1987
Motel Hell	Kevin Connor	1980
The Devil's Rain	Robert Fuest	1975
Christine	John Carpenter	1983
The Living Dead at the Manchester Morgue	Jorge Grau	1974
The Manitou	William Girdler	1978
2013
Title	Director	Release Year
Amityville II: The Possession	Damiano Damiani	1982
Kingdom of the Spiders	John Cardos	1977
The Fly	David Cronenberg	1986
Hell High	Douglas Grossman	1989
The Car	Elliot Silverstein	1977
The Sentinel	Michael Winner	1977
2014
Title	Director	Release Year
Creepshow	George A. Romero	1982
Gargoyles	Bill L. Norton	1972
The Thing	John Carpenter	1982
Night of 1,000 Cats	René Cardona Jr.	1972
The Deadly Spawn	Douglas McKeown	1983
Basket Case	Frank Henenlotter	1982
Zombie Holocaust	Marino Girolami	1980
2015
Title	Director	Release Year
Halloween III: Season of the Witch	Tommy Lee Wallace	1982
Death Spa	Michael Fischa	1989
Anguish	Bigas Luna	1987
Spookies	Brendan Faulkner / Thomas Doran / Eugenie Joseph	1986
Dead & Buried	Gary Sherman	1981
Pieces	Juan Piquer Simón	1982
The Nest	Terence H. Winkless	1988
2016
Title	Director	Release Year
The Blob	Chuck Russell	1988
Devil Fetus	Lau Hung-chuen	1983
The Entity	Sidney J. Furie	1982
Phantasm II	Don Coscarelli	1988
Hell Night	Tom DeSimone	1981
Brain Damage	Frank Henenlotter	1988
Humanoids From the Deep	Barbara Peeters	1980
2017
Title	Director	Release Year
An American Werewolf in London	John Landis	1981
Popcorn	Mark Herrier	1991
The Tingler	William Castle	1959
Hack-o-Lantern	Jag Mundhra	1988
Shocker	Wes Craven	1989
Brainscan	John Flynn	1994
Death Bed: The Bed That Eats	George Barry	1977/2003
2018
Title	Director	Release Year
Jason X	Jim Isaac	2001
Body Melt	Philip Brophy	1993
Link	Richard Franklin	1986
Maximum Overdrive	Stephen King	1986
Zombie 3	Lucio Fulci / Bruno Mattei	1988
Curtains	Richard Ciupka	1983
Antropophagus	Joe D'Amato	1980
2019
Title	Director	Release Year
Critters	Stephen Herek	1986
Halloween II	Rick Rosenthal	1981
Ruby	Curtis Harrington	1977
Lisa and the Devil	Mario Bava	1972
Butcher, Baker, Nightmare Maker	William Asher	1981
Demonoid	Alfredo Zacarías	1980
The Crazies	George A. Romero	1973
2021
Title	Director	Release Year
In the Mouth of Madness	John Carpenter	1994
It's Alive	Larry Cohen	1974
Nightbeast	Don Dohler	1982
House of Wax	Jaume Collet-Serra	2005
Horror Express	Eugenio Martín	1972
The Brain	Ed Hunt	1988
2022
Title	Director	Release Year
Lord of Illusions	Clive Barker	1995
Horror of Dracula	Terence Fisher	1958
The Hidden	Jack Sholder	1987
Mortuary	Howard Avedis	1983
Zombie	Lucio Fulci	1979
Slaughterhouse Rock	Dimitri Logothetis	1987
2023
Title	Director	Release Year
Dolls	Stuart Gordon	1987
Frankenhooker	Frank Henenlotter	1990
Psycho II	Richard Franklin	1983
Faceless	Jesús Franco	1988
Prince of Darkness	John Carpenter	1987
Primal Rage	Vittorio Rambaldi	1988
2024
Title	Director	Release Year
Species	Roger Donaldson	1995
Devil Times Five	Sean MacGregor / David Sheldon	1974
Flesheater	Bill Hinzman	1988
Bug	Jeannot Szwarc	1975
Sleepwalkers	Mick Garris	1992
Black Roses	John Fasano	1988
2025
Title	Director	Release Year
The Funhouse	Tobe Hooper	1981
Night of the Living Dead	Tom Savini	1990
Hello Mary Lou: Prom Night II	Bruce Pittman	1987
Demon Witch Child	Amando de Ossorio	1975
Squirm	Jeff Lieberman	1976
Night of the Demon	James C. Wasson	1980
2026
Title	Director	Release Year
A Nightmare on Elm Street 2: Freddy's Revenge	Jack Sholder	1985
The Hills Have Eyes	Wes Craven	1977
The Gate	Tibor Takács	1987
Frightmare	Norman Thaddeus Vane	1981
Destroyer	Robert Kirk	1988
The Savage Bees	Bruce Geller	1976
