= Galaxy Invader =

1985 film directed by Don Dohler

- VHS cover art
- Directed by: Don Dohler
- Written by: Don Dohler; Anne Frith (additional scenes); David W. Donoho (additional scenes)
- Produced by: Don Dohler
- Starring: Richard Ruxton; George Stover
- Cinematography: Paul Loeschke
- Edited by: Don Dohler
- Music by: Norman Noplock
- Production company: Moviecraft Entertainment
- Distributed by: Moviecraft Entertainment
- Release date: April 1985
- Running time: 72 minutes
- Country: United States
- Language: English
- Budget: $4,000 – $42,000

Galaxy Invader (Note: Titled onscreen as The Galaxy Invader.) is a 1985 American direct-to-video science fiction film directed and co-written by Baltimore filmmaker Don Dohler. The film's plot centers on an alien who is pursued by hillbillies after his spaceship crash-lands on Earth. The cast is made of entirely non-professional actors, mainly friends and family of Dohler.

== Plot ==
VHS cover of Galaxy Invader

When a glowing meteor-like object careens toward the Earth, a young student, David Harmon, is narrowly missed as it falls into the forest ahead of him. He calls his old high school teacher, Dr. William Tracy, to tell him about this potential UFO landing. Several hours later, a young couple hears a noise in their basement and go down to see what it is. As they slowly descend into the basement, they are terrified and knocked out or possibly killed by a green humanoid alien.

Joe Montague, is angered by his daughter, Carol, at breakfast and chases her through the woods with a gun. After encountering the alien and finding the power source to its weapon, the space ball, Frank Custer, advises Joe to hunt the alien for a reward. The alien is hunted by a gang of locals led by Montague intent on cashing in on the creature. Joe captures the alien and ties it up in his garage. Dr. Tracy and David break into the garage and set the alien free. As they flee the garage into the woods, Frank shoots Dr. Tracy. The alien returns and shoots Frank, then Joe shoots the alien and takes back the space gun. Frank's wife comes looking for him at Joe's house and, following his history of domestic violence, Joe tries to rape her. As she runs away, Joe shoots Frank's wife using the space gun. Joe's family conspire with Michael Smith, Carol's boyfriend, to set the alien free and return it home. When they steal the weapons from Joe's sleeping hands, he suddenly wakes and pursues the group with a shotgun and corners them at the edge of a cliff. When all hope is lost, the alien appears and attacks Joe. Joe kills the alien using the space gun, but it gives enough time for Michael Smith to get the jump on Joe. A fight ensues and ends with Joe's wife, Ethel, knocking him off a cliff with his rifle.

== Cast ==
- Richard Ruxton as Joe Montague
- Faye Tilles as Carol Montague
- George Stover as J.J. Montague
- Greg Dohler as David Harmon
- Anne Frith as Ethel Montague
- Don Leifert as Frank Custer
- Dick Dyszel as Dr. William Tracy
- Theresa Harold as Vickie Johnson
- Glenn Barnes as the alien
- Cliff Lambert as Michael Smith
- Jerry Schuerholz as McGregor
- Paul Wilson as Thompson
- David W. Donoho as Giddings (credited as David Donoho)
- Doug Moran as Turner
- Bunky Hart as Cosco

== Production ==
The cast of Galaxy Invader consists of director Don Dohler's stable of friends and includes Donald Leifert and George Stover, both of whom featured in Dohler's earlier films, The Alien Factor, Fiend and Nightbeast. Richard Ruxton, another of the film's principal actors, would go on to appear in Dohler's next film, Blood Massacre. Also appearing in a starring role is Dohler's son, Greg Dohler, who plays David Harmon.

Galaxy Invader was shot entirely in and around Baltimore, Maryland, Dohler's hometown. Galaxy Invader was one of four movies Dohler made in Baltimore within a 10-year period, each of which had budgets ranging from as low as $4,000 to as high as $42,000.

The body thrown off a cliff at the end of the movie is made of PVC piping.

== Release ==
Galaxy Invader was released direct-to-video on VHS in 1985. In 2004, the film was released on DVD by Treeline Films, as part of the 50 Movie Pack: SciFi Classics boxed set. Mill Creek Entertainment included the film in the 2007 100 Movie Pack: Sci-Fi Classics boxed set, and in the 2009 Sci-Fi Classics 50 Movie Pack "Anniversary Edition" boxed set.

In 2007, Galaxy Invader was also released on DVD as a double feature with the 1968 film Kong Island by Alpha Home Entertainment.

A Rifftrax version of the film was released on DVD in 2012.

== Reception ==
In 2009, VideoHound's Golden Movie Retriever gave the movie "1 bone", which in their terms is defined as, "Poor use of camera, film, sets, script, actors, and studio vehicles."

In 2011, RiffTrax, consisting of Mystery Science Theater 3000 alumni Michael J Nelson, Bill Corbett and Kevin Murphy mocked Galaxy Invader.

In 2012, Bleeding Skull! calls it, "Uneventful, but semi-entertaining." "While the somber mood and deeper themes bode well for Galaxy Invader, the vacant second half drowns everything out."

== Use in other media ==
Footage from Galaxy Invader was used without permission in the introductory and ending credits for the Film Ventures release of the Spanish-language film Pod People in 1990. Said release in turn was featured as an episode of Mystery Science Theater 3000 the following year.
