= John Dodd =

John Dodd may refer to:

- Jack Dodd (John Newton Dodd; 1922–2005), New Zealand physicist
- John Dodd (bow maker) (1752–1839), English bow-maker
- John Dodd (engineer) (1932–2022), created an aero-engined car called "The Beast"
- John Dodd (jockey) (1863–1881), Australian jockey killed in the 1881 Melbourne Cup
- John Dodd (Liberal politician) (1904–1973), British Member of Parliament for Oldham, 1935–1945
- John Dodd (Reading MP) (1717–1782), English Member of Parliament for Reading, 1741, and 1755–1782
- John Dodd (tea merchant) (fl. 1860s), Scottish merchant and author on Formosa, pioneer of Taiwan's tea industry
- John Dodd (Wells MP) (c. 1693–1719), English Member of Parliament for Wells, 1717–1719
- John L. Dodd, American lawyer and 116th President General of the Sons of the American Revolution
- Johnny Dodd (1941–1991), American lighting designer
- Johnny Dodd (rugby league) (1928–2007), rugby league footballer of the 1950s for New Zealand, and Wellington
- John Dodd (wrestler) (1929–2006), Welsh wrestler

== See also ==
- John Dodds (disambiguation)
- John Dods (born 1948), special effects make-up artist
