= John Dodds =

John Dodds may refer to:

- John Dodds (motorcyclist), Australian motorcycle racer
- John Dodds (footballer), Scottish footballer
- John M. Dodds, Scottish electrical engineer
- Sir John Stokell Dodds, Australian politician and Chief Justice of Tasmania
- Johnny Dodds, American jazz musician

== See also ==
- John Dodd (disambiguation)
- John Dods, special effects make-up artist
