= Donald Leifert =

American actor and writer (1951–2010)

- Born: Donald L. Leifert Jr. February 27, 1951; United States
- Died: October 23, 2010 (aged 59); United States
- Occupations: Film director, producer, actor, writer, teacher, film historian
- Children: 1

Donald L. Leifert Jr. (February 27, 1951 – October 23, 2010) was an American science fiction and horror film actor, writer, teacher and film historian.

== Early life ==
Leifert was born on February 27, 1951, to Dolores J. and Donald L. Leifert Sr., and had a sister, Cheryl J. Young. He later served in the Vietnam War.

== Film career ==
Leifert, a professionally trained actor, worked with Baltimore filmmaker Don Dohler, a former journalist, on science fiction/horror films including Galaxy Invader, Nightbeast, and The Alien Factor. He also played Eric Longfellow in the 1980 film Fiend and Longfellow again in the 1992 film Deadly Neighbor. Leifert, called a "Baltimore horror maven" by Michael Sragow, appeared in several films for Dohler, did the costumes for Galaxy Invader, and was quoted as saying, "if you watch the films [I was in] carefully, they're really saved in the editing room. He would sit and chain-smoke cigarettes and work at that editing machine for months and months and months—no one would see or hear from him."

== Later years ==
Not wanting to resume his acting career, Leifert launched a "literate film appreciation magazine" named Movie Club with Dohler in 1993, where he managed the editorial side and Dohler the business side, commenting the following year that "it's fun to write about these films, because they're fun films." He earned a law degree and taught at the George Washington Carver Center for Arts and Technology (also called the Carver School for the Arts) before leaving in 2000 to teach at Towson High School in Towson, Maryland. His role in Crawler in 2004, as Zachary, was his last acting role on screen. He also appeared in Blood, Boobs and Beast, a 2006 documentary on the career of Dohler.

Leifert became an English and theater arts teacher at Towson and authored the autobiography Riggie: A Journey from 5th Street. He also directed stage shows at Towson, including the play Approaching Zanzibar in 2005 and Bye Bye Birdie for the spring musical in 2007.

== Personal life ==
Leifert had a daughter. Leifert died in his sleep on October 23, 2010, after having a heart attack. His memorial service was held at Grace Fellowship Church in Timonium, Maryland, and a memorial scholarship fund was set up in his name.

== Filmography ==
- 1978: The Alien Factor – Ben Zachary
- 1980: Fiend – Eric Longfellow
- 1982: Nightbeast – Drago
- 1985: Galaxy Invader – Frank Custor
- 1992: Deadly Neighbor – Eric Longfellow
- 2004: Crawler – Zachary
