= Fiend (film) =

- VHS cover art
- Directed by: Don Dohler
- Written by: Don Dohler
- Produced by: Ted A. Bohus; Don Dohler
- Starring: Don Leifert; Elaine White; Richard Nelson; George Stover
- Cinematography: Richard Geiwitz; Don Dohler
- Edited by: Don Dohler
- Music by: Paul Woznicki
- Production company: Force Video
- Distributed by: Cinema Enterprises
- Release date: September 1980
- Running time: 90 minutes
- Country: United States
- Language: English
- Budget: $6,000 (est.)

Fiend is a 1980 American B movie science fiction horror film directed and written by low-budget filmmaker Don Dohler, shot in Perry Hall, Maryland and starring Don Leifert, Elaine White, Richard Nelson, and George Stover. The film had U.S. theatrical release in September 1980.

== Plot ==
An evil spirit enters a graveyard and reanimates the corpse of music teacher Eric Longfellow. However, in order to stay alive, he has to wrap his hands around his victims' throats to absorb their life essences. When he moves to the suburbs of Baltimore, Maryland, his neighbor Gary Kender begins to suspect something just is not right with Mr. Longfellow.

== Main cast ==
- Don Leifert as Eric Longfellow
- Elaine White as Marsha Kender
- George Stover as Dennis Frye
- Richard Nelson as Gary Kender
- Del Winans as Jimmy Barnes
- Kim Dohler as Kristy Michaels
- Debbie Vogel as Helen Weiss
- Pam Dohler as Jane Clayton
- Greg Dohler as Scotty
- Richard Geiwitz as Fred
- Lydia Vuynovich as Angie
- Steve Frith as Steve
- Anne Frith as Katie

== Release ==
The film had U.S. theatrical release in September 1980. Later release included on U.S. VHS as Deadly Neighbor and in West Germany as Angst der Verlorenen.

== Reception ==
Having years previously read an article about the making of Fiend, author Scott Phillips had wanted to see the film but had not been able to locate a copy. When later as a staff writer at Monsters at Play, he found a copy and wrote [sic] "So was it worth the 20+ -year wait? Two words: Holy Freakin' Hell, Yes. Any movie that delivers this kind of cheese-slathered drive-in goodness is gonna get the big thumbs-up from this li'l reviewer, you can count on that - and Fiend serves it up big", and went on to praise, plot, effects, lighting, and acting. He noted the film benefited from writer/director Don Dohler avoiding gore in favor of atmosphere, doing "a great job of delivering some creepy moments, one of which - involving a little girl behind Longfellow's house - will have you squirming in your seat. It gets goofy in places, but that's part of what makes it so enjoyable." The film is recommended for anyone loving old-school, late-nite horror films. The DVD transfer of the original 16mm film was good considering the age of the original film stock, and includes a blooper reel, a still gallery, and the "gratuitous George Stover gallery" (there's also a great photo of the lovely "Miss Kim" (Fred Olen Ray's wife) on the Retromedia website link)."

Contrarily, when re-released and co-featured with The Alien Factor on DVD in 2005, DVD Talk compared the two films, and in finding T.A.F. almost likable, felt that Fiend was "an almost complete failure, primarily because it is much more dependent on Dohler's storytelling and direction, and his skills aren't up to the task in either department," concluding it was "little more than a backyard movie not worth anyone's time."
