= Bozo the Clown =

Fictional children's character

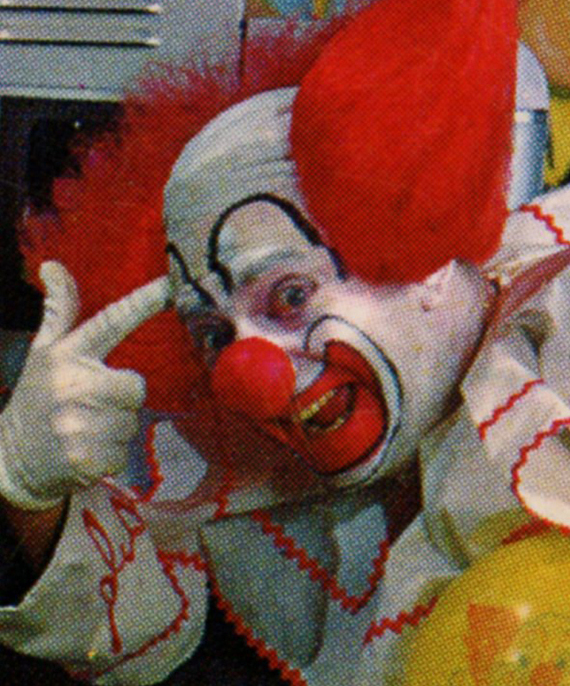
- An iteration of Bozo the Clown at WFGA-TV in Jacksonville, Florida, in 1961. This is his most well-known design.
- First appearance: 1946 (in music); 1949 (in television)
- Associates: Butch; Cooky; Oliver O. Oliver; Sandy; Ringmaster Ned; Mr. Bob; Jozo Bozo
- Attire: Clown suit
- Alias: The World's Most Famous Clown
- Gender: Male
- Occupation: children's entertainment in music and television
- Home: United States

Bozo the Clown, also known as "The World's Most Famous Clown", is a clown character created for children's entertainment, widely popular in the second half of the 20th century. He was introduced in the United States in 1946, and to television in 1949, later appearing in franchised television programs of which he was the host, where he was portrayed by numerous local performers.

== Creation and history ==
The character was created by Alan W. Livingston, and portrayed by Pinto Colvig for a children's storytelling record album and illustrated read-along book set in 1946. He became popular and served as the mascot for Capitol Records.

The character first appeared on US television in 1949 portrayed by Colvig. After the creative rights to Bozo were purchased by Larry Harmon in 1957, the character became a common franchise across the United States, with local television stations producing their own Bozo shows featuring the character. Harmon bought out his business partners in 1965 and produced Bozo's Big Top for syndication to local television markets not producing their own Bozo shows in 1966, while Chicago's Bozo's Circus, which premiered in 1960, went national via cable and satellite in 1978.

Bozo also appeared in a 1958–1962 animated series, Bozo: The World's Most Famous Clown, with Harmon providing the voice of Bozo.

Performers who have portrayed Bozo, aside from Colvig and Harmon, include Syd Saylor (1950s on KTTV), Bob McNea (1959-1966), Earl Frank Cady (WJRT-TV, 1967-), Willard Scott (1959–1962), Frank Avruch (1959–1970), Bob Bell (1960–1984), and Joey D'Auria (1984–2001). Bozo TV shows were also produced in other countries including Mexico, Brazil, Greece, Australia, and Thailand.

David Arquette purchased the rights to the Bozo the Clown character from Larry Harmon Pictures in 2021. Arquette added a multiracial female counterpart to the cast, Jozo Bozo, in 2022.

== Franchises and licensing ==
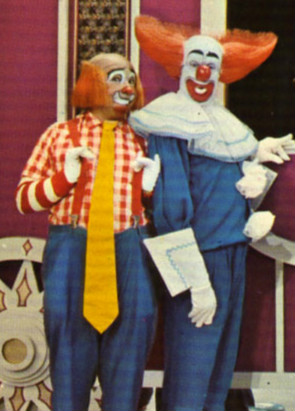
Cooky (Roy Brown) and Bozo (Bob Bell) on WGN-TV Chicago's Bozo's Circus in 1976.

Bozo was created as a character by Livingston, who produced a children's storytelling record-album and illustrative read-along book set, the first of its kind, titled Bozo at the Circus for Capitol Records and released in October 1946. Colvig portrayed the character on this and subsequent Bozo read-along records. The albums were popular and the character became a mascot for the record company and was later nicknamed "Bozo the Capitol Clown." Many non-Bozo Capitol children's records had a "Bozo Approved" label on the jacket. In 1948, Capitol and Livingston began setting up royalty arrangements with manufacturers and television stations for use of the Bozo character. KTTV in Los Angeles began broadcasting the first show, Bozo's Circus, in 1949 featuring Colvig as Bozo with his blue-and-red costume, over-sized red hair and whiteface clown makeup on Fridays at 7:30 p.m.

In 1957, Larry Harmon, one of several actors hired by Livingston and Capitol Records to portray Bozo at promotional appearances, formed a business partnership and bought the licensing rights (excluding the record-readers) to the character one year after Livingston left Capitol. Harmon renamed the character "Bozo, The World's Most Famous Clown" and modified the voice and costume, also changing the laugh to a distinctively hoarse, slightly deranged chuckle. He then worked with a wig stylist to get the wing-tipped bright orange style and look of the hair that had previously appeared in Capitol's Bozo comic books. He started his own animation studio and distributed (through Jayark Films Corporation) a series of cartoons (with Harmon as the voice of Bozo) to television stations, along with the rights for each to hire its own live Bozo host, beginning with KTLA-TV in Los Angeles on January 5, 1959, and starring Vance Colvig Jr., son of the original "Bozo the Clown," Pinto Colvig.

Unlike many other shows on television, "Bozo the Clown" was mostly a franchise as opposed to being syndicated, meaning that local TV stations could put on their own local productions of the show complete with their own Bozo. Another show that had previously used this model successfully was fellow children's program Romper Room. Because each market used a different actor for the character, the voice and look of each market's Bozo also differed slightly. One example is the voice and laugh of Chicago's WGN-TV Bob Bell, who also wore a red costume throughout the first decade of his portrayal.

The wigs for Bozo were originally manufactured through the Hollywood firm Emil Corsillo Inc. The company designed and manufactured toupees and wigs for the entertainment industry. Bozo's headpiece was made from yak hair, which was adhered to a canvas base with a starched burlap interior foundation. The hair was styled and formed, then sprayed with a heavy coat of lacquer to maintain its form. Occasionally the headpiece needed freshening, and was sent to the Hollywood factory for a quick refurbishing. The canvas top would slide over the actor's forehead. With the exception of the Bozo wigs for WGN-TV Chicago, the eyebrows were permanently painted on the headpiece.

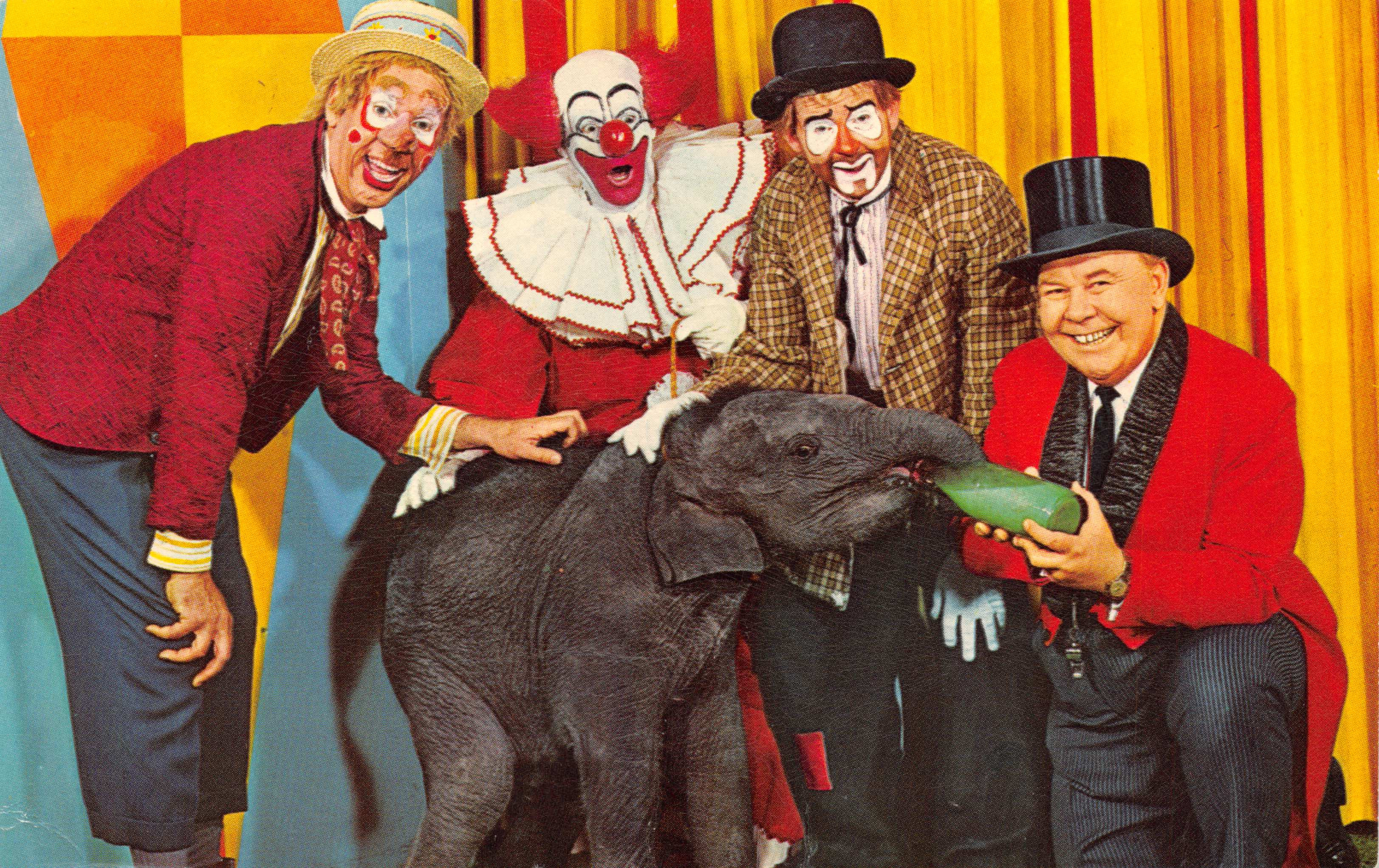
1963 photo of Oliver O. Oliver (Ray Rayner), Bozo (Bob Bell), Sandy (Don Sandburg) and Ringmaster Ned (Ned Locke) on WGN-TV Chicago's Bozo's Circus.

In 1965, Harmon bought out his business partners and became the sole owner of the licensing rights. Thinking that one national show that he fully owned would be more profitable for his company, Harmon produced 130 of his own half-hour shows from 1965 to 1967 titled Bozo's Big Top which aired on Boston's WHDH-TV (now WCVB-TV) with Boston's Bozo, Frank Avruch, for syndication in 1966. Avruch's portrayal and look of Bozo resembled Harmon's more so than most of the other portrayers' at the time. Avruch was enlisted by UNICEF as an international ambassador and was featured in a documentary, Bozo's Adventures in Asia.

The show's distribution network included New York City, Los Angeles, Washington, D.C., and Boston at one point, though most television stations still preferred to continue producing their own versions. The most popular local version was Bob Bell and WGN-TV Chicago's Bozo's Circus, which went national via cable and satellite in 1978. It had a waiting list for studio tickets that eventually reached ten years.

Bell retired in 1984 and was replaced by Joey D'Auria. The WGN version successfully survived competition from syndicated and network children's programs until 1994, when WGN management decided to exit the weekday children's television business and buried The Bozo Show in an early Sunday timeslot as The Bozo Super Sunday Show. It suffered another blow in 1997, when its format became educational following a Federal Communications Commission mandate requiring broadcast television stations to air a minimum three hours of educational children's programs per week.

In 2001, station management controversially ended production, citing increased competition from newer children's cable channels. In 2005, WGN's Bozo returned to television in a two-hour retrospective titled Bozo, Gar and Ray: WGN TV Classics. The prime-time premiere was No. 1 in the Chicago market and continues to be rebroadcast and streamed live worldwide during the holiday season each year. In 2003, Harmon released six of his Bozo's Big Top programs with Avruch on DVD and 2 box sets of 30 episodes each in 2007 retitled "Larry Harmon's Bozo, The World's Most Famous Clown Vols.1 & 2." The WGN Bozo shows have not been released commercially in any video format.

On July 3, 2008, Larry Harmon died of congestive heart failure at the age of 83. On March 13, 2009, Alan W. Livingston died of age-related causes at the age of 91. On October 2, 2010, The New York Times reported that the father of U.S. Senate candidate Christine O'Donnell "worked a series of small television roles before scoring his signature gig, playing Bozo the Clown." But upon further investigation, a New York Times follow-up two days later reported that the father, Daniel O'Donnell, was an assistant and understudy for the full-time local television Bozo in Philadelphia and would fill in for the full-time Bozo when the latter was unavailable.

== Bozo the Clown series by locality ==
=== Boston TV ===
The Bozo franchise appeared on two separate Boston-area stations from 1959 to 1974.

==== WHDH-TV Boston ====
The local WHDH-TV Boston production of Bozo's Circus, with Frank Avruch playing Bozo, aired daily from 1959 until 1970. In 1965, Larry Harmon became the sole owner of the Bozo licensing rights after buying out his business partners, and produced 130 episodes of the Boston-based Bozo show between 1965 and 1967 and syndicated them to local U.S. television markets that did not produce their own Bozo shows. The half-hour syndicated shows were retitled Bozo The Clown (on episodes with a 1965 date) and Bozo's Big Top (on episodes with a 1966 date). Caroll Spinney (billed in the credits as Ed Spinney) appeared as various characters which included Mr. Lion and Kookie the Boxing Kangaroo. He later went on to portray Big Bird and Oscar the Grouch on Sesame Street. Carl Carlsson also appeared as Bozo's sidekick Professor Tweedy Foofer. Ruth Carlsson also appeared in several 1966 episodes. Del Grosso played Clank the Robot in a few episodes. Harmon personally supervised the taping of these episodes, with Harmon-approved characters added, some based on characters in Harmon's classic 1958–1962 animated Bozo cartoon shorts which also aired in each episode. These were the only Bozo shows Harmon fully owned. Bozo's frequent exclamations on the show included, "Whoa, Nellie!" and "Wowie Kazowie!" and always ended the show with, "Always keep laughing!"

The Boston show also occasionally featured Nozo the Clown, the brother of Bozo, played by Bill Harrington. Nozo was used to fill in for Bozo on occasion when Frank Avruch was unable to appear on the show. Nozo did not wear the red ball on his nose that other Bozos wore. Instead, his nose was Harrington's nose in makeup.

In 2003, Harmon released six of these shows on DVD and, in 2007, 30 of them in a DVD box set titled Larry Harmon's Bozo, The World's Most Famous Clown, Collection 1. A second box set was released later that year, also containing 30 of the half-hours; the second box set (Collection 2) includes the six episodes previously released on the two earlier single DVD releases, and also repeats one show from Collection 1, for a grand total of 59 episodes released on DVD altogether. Although the shows included on the two single-disc DVDs had contemporary computer-animated characters superimposed over some scenes, the 59 episodes included in Collections 1 & 2 are presented in their original form.

On March 20, 2018, Frank Avruch died of heart failure in Boston at the age of 89.

==== WSMW-TV Worcester ====
From 1970 to 1973, WSMW-TV—an independent station in Worcester, Massachusetts, west of Boston—produced Bozo's Big Top, their local version of the Bozo the Clown franchise. Tom Matzell played Bozo, alongside Gene Sanocki as Bozo's sidekick Professor Tweetyfoofer. Local children were featured on the program daily, with many waiting a year or more for their chance to be on the show. The program was canceled due to falling ratings.

=== Detroit/Windsor ===
Bozo first came to Detroit in 1958 on WWJ-TV channel 4. Bob McNea, who worked as a clown in various circuses, including the Shrine Circus, was hired to play Bozo. McNea's Bozo became popular, expanding to two shows a day, and becoming the first children's program in Detroit to switch to color. However, there was friction with Larry Harmon. McNea played the character in a more genteel and subdued way than Harmon's playbook required, and McNea did the show without a live audience. After years of increasing the franchise fee, WWJ-TV ended the contract with Harmon in 1967. WWJ-TV kept McNea, who created his own clown character Oopsy, which continued on WWJ-TV until 1979. McNea then took Oopsy to CKCO-TV in Kitchener, Ontario where he continued for another 15 years.

Meanwhile, across the Detroit River in Windsor, Ontario CKLW-TV channel 9 picked up the Bozo franchise in 1967. Popular local talent Jerry Booth was tapped to play Bozo, but he only did the role for a few months. He was replaced by local disc jockey and radio program director Art Cervi, who was the definitive Bozo to Detroit families. Now titled Bozo's Big Top, Cervi was joined by Larry Thompson as red-suited, turban wearing Mr. Whoodini, who had hosted his own children's show Magic Shoppe, as his sidekick. Also on the show was piano player Mr. Calliope, played by Wally Townsend.

Unlike WWJ-TV, CKLW-TV included a live audience, but they also did things that were not sanctioned by Harmon. CKLW-TV quickly phased out the cartoons, increasing the entertainment on Bozo's Big Top. After a taped opening in which Bozo runs through the streets of Detroit calling kids to his Big Top, and on set singing and dancing to the "Bozo is Back" theme song, with the illuminated, flashing Bozo sign superimposed over in a slightly psychedelic way, Cervi would preside over an hour long variety show that included local dance troupes, singers, musicians, live animals, and national celebrities. In between, kids would play games to win prizes (one of the most plentiful being a six-pack of Orange Crush), Mr. Whoodini would pick kids to assist him in magic tricks, and of course Bozo would provide comedy. Cervi was also a good singer, and one of the highlights were two or three times per show, Bozo would sit next to Mr. Calliope at his piano and sing a song, most of the time in Cervi's own voice rather than his Bozo voice, with all the kids in the audience clapping in time to the music. The shows would usually end with Bozo and Mr. Whoodini going into the audience and letting kids tell jokes and riddles. At one point Bozo's Big Top became so popular, that it aired twice a day.

In 1977, after the station's conversion to CBC Television-owned CBET, the Canadian border protection and labor rules forced the station to cancel Bozo's Big Top because most of the cast and staff were American. Bozo's Big Top moved to WJBK-TV channel 2, where it lasted for two more years, and was syndicated to other markets such as New York, Las Vegas, Wichita, and Los Angeles. Due to WJBK-TV's lack of interest in producing such an ambitious show, it was cancelled in 1979, ending Bozo's twenty-year reign in Detroit and Windsor.

On November 5, 2005, Bob McNea, the first Detroit Bozo, died at the age of 76.

In 2014, a memoir of Art Cervi's Bozo years, I Did What?, co-written by Herb Mentzer, was published.

On February 5, 2019, Larry Thompson, who played Mr. Whoodini, died at the age of 76.

On February 15, 2021, Art Cervi died at his Novi, MI home at age 86.

=== Washington, D.C. ===
Willard Scott played Bozo on WRC-TV from 1959 to 1962. Dick Dyszel played the character on Washington, D.C. broadcast TV, WDCA channel 20, in the 1970s to millions of viewers. Dyszel also played TV horror host "Count Gore de Vol" and hosted "Captain 20" afternoon kids' TV shows in D.C.

=== Chicago TV ===
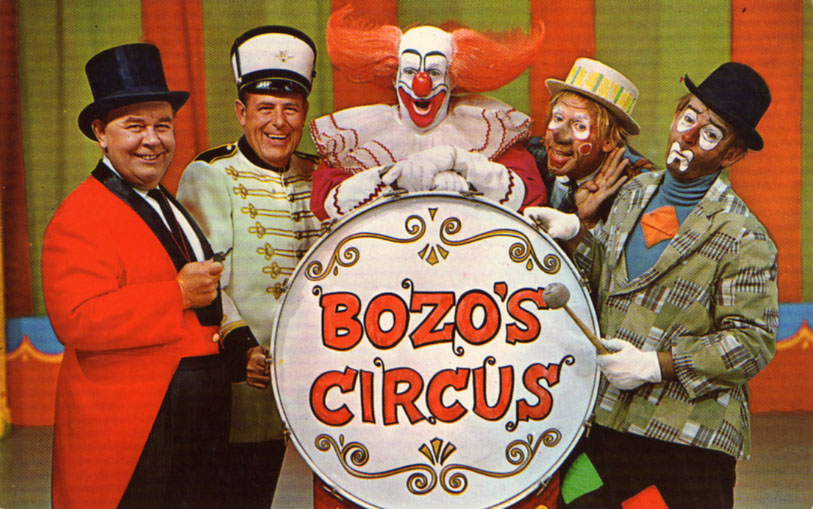
WGN-TV Chicago's 1960s cast of Bozo's Circus. From left: Ringmaster Ned (Ned Locke), Mr. Bob (bandleader Bob Trendler), Bozo (Bob Bell), Oliver O. Oliver (Ray Rayner) and Sandy (Don Sandburg).

The Chicago Bozo franchise was the most popular and successful locally produced children's program in the history of television. It also became the most widely known Bozo show as WGN-TV became a national cable television Superstation. WGN-TV Chicago's "Bozo" show debuted on June 20, 1960, starring Bob Bell on a live half-hour program weekdays at noon, performing comedy sketches and introducing cartoons. The series was placed on hiatus in January 1961 to facilitate WGN's move from Tribune Tower in downtown Chicago to 2501 West Bradley Place on the city's northwest side. WGN-TV's "Bozo's Circus" debuted on September 11, 1961.

The live hour-long show aired weekdays at noon and featured comedy sketches, circus acts, cartoons, games and prizes before a 200+ member studio audience. The program began airing nationally via cable and satellite in 1978, and studio audience reservations surpassed a 10-year wait. In 1980, the series moved to weekday mornings as "The Bozo Show" and aired on tape delay. In 1994, it moved to Sunday mornings as "The Bozo Super Sunday Show" and became "education and information" in 1997 following a Federal Communications Commission mandate requiring broadcast television stations to air a minimum three hours per week of "educational and informational" children's programs. The final Bozo show, a primetime special titled "Bozo: 40 Years of Fun!" was taped on June 12, 2001, and aired on July 14, 2001. Reruns of "The Bozo Super Sunday Show" aired until August 26, 2001.

Cast members throughout the program's 40-year run included Bob Bell as Bozo (1960–1984) (Bell's voice was later the pattern for that of Krusty the Clown on The Simpsons), Ned Locke as Ringmaster Ned (1961–1976), Don Sandburg as Sandy the Tramp (1961–1969), Ray Rayner as Oliver O. Oliver (1961–1971), Roy Brown as Cooky the Cook (1968–1994), Marshall Brodien as Wizzo the Wizard (1968–1994), Frazier Thomas as the circus manager (1976–1985), Joey D'Auria as Bozo (1984–2001), Andy Mitran as Professor Andy (1987–2001) and Robin Eurich as Rusty the Handyman (1994–2001). Bozo returned to television on December 24, 2005, in a two-hour retrospective titled "Bozo, Gar & Ray: WGN TV Classics." The primetime premiere was No. 1 in the Chicago market and continues to be rebroadcast and streamed annually during the holiday season. Bozo also continues to appear on the WGN-TV float in Chicago's biggest parades.

Allen Hall, the long-time producer, died of lung cancer on September 6, 2011, after an 18-month illness, at the age of 82. Hall worked at WGN for 40 years. He joined the station in 1961, a year after "Bozo" debuted on WGN, as the show's director until 1966 and returned to the program as producer in 1973 until 2001.

Few episodes from the show's first two decades survive; although some shows were recorded to videotape for delayed broadcasts, the tapes were reused and eventually discarded. In 2012, a vintage tape was located on the Walter J. Brown Media Archives & Peabody Awards Collection Web site archive list by Rick Klein of The Museum of Classic Chicago Television, containing material from two 1971 episodes. WGN reacquired the tape and put together a new special entitled "Bozo's Circus: The Lost Tape," which aired in December 2012.

On October 6, 2018, Don Sandburg, "Bozo's Circus" producer and writer from 1961 to 1969 and the last surviving original cast member, died at the age of 87. Four months later, WGN-TV paid tribute to Sandburg and the rest of the original cast with a two-hour special titled "Bozo's Circus: The 1960s." As of 2021, WGN stated that it was still maintaining its license to use the Bozo character from its owners, even after it had stopped producing new episodes 20 years earlier.

=== Grand Rapids, Michigan ===
From 1966 to 1999, WZZM-TV produced a Bozo show, starring Dick Richards for the majority of the run. Significant is that when it was cancelled in 1999, it was the last Bozo show other than the Chicago WGN show to be on the air.

=== Brazilian TV ===
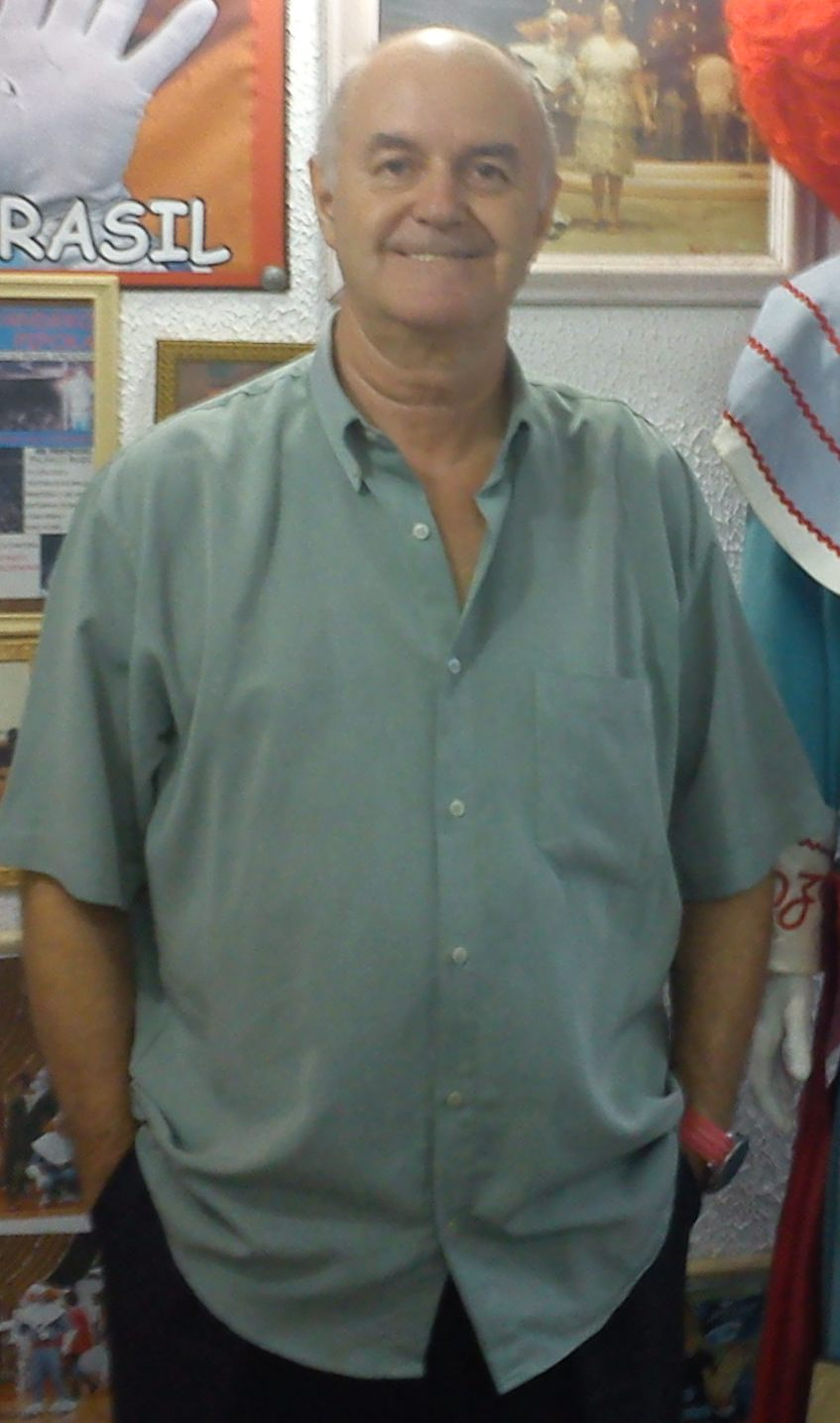
Wandeko Pipoca, the first performer to portray Bozo in Brazil.

In 1979, Brazil's most famous TV show host Silvio Santos (founder and former owner of the SBT television network) decided to produce a national version of Bozo show for the former TVS-Record TV alliance station. Comedian Wandeko Pipoca was chosen by Larry Harmon to be the first Brazilian Bozo. Brazilian characters were created for the Brazilian Bozo show, like Salci Fufu — played by famous comedian Pedro de Lara — and Vovó Mafalda, played by Valentino Guzzo. With the clown's large success in Brazil, two more actors, Luís Ricardo and Arlindo Barreto, were hired to play Bozo for additional shows which ran from mornings to afternoons and more comedians were chosen to play Bozo in other parts of the country. Brazil's Bozo shows ended in 1991, following the death of Décio Roberto, the last actor to portray the clown in that country. Brazil's Bozo won five Troféu Imprensa, a Brazilian award given to personalities and productions in the media (in 1984, 1985, 1986, 1987 and 1989), as well as three Gold Albums. In the last years of the program, UNESCO bestowed the Brazilian Bozo with its Ambassador of Goodwill recognition, for its outstanding success among children and the youth.

In 2012, SBT decided to buy the rights to use Bozo again for a new TV show, inspired by the popularity of the Patati Patatá clowns who had been on the channel since 2011. Bozo was played by both Jean Santos and Nelson Tamberi in this return, however his return to the channel had a negative reception having been abruptly introduced in the children's show Bom Dia & Cia until his show premiered in February 2013 on Saturday mornings where it was canceled in less than 3 months. Much later, in 2024, SBT decided to buy the rights to use Bozo again, making him have guest appearances on TV shows such as Programa Silvio Santos.

The program left a great legacy in the country, with Bozo continuing to be referenced even decades after the end of the original show on SBT. In the 2000s, MTV Brasil's adult comedy show Hermes & Renato had a sketch called "Palhaço Gozo" which consisted of an erotic parody of Bozo. In 2017, the film Bingo: The King of the Mornings premiered, being a biographical film inspired by the life of Arlindo Barreto. During Jair Bolsonaro's government as president between 2019 and 2022, Bolsonaro was notably referred to as Bozo by many of his opponents as a way of belittling him as a joke. The 2019 Batman comic "The Dark Knight Returns: The Golden Child" made a reference to president Bolsonaro with the name "JM Bozo". In 2020, a samba school in Rio de Janeiro made a float with a doll representing president Bolsonaro dressed as Bozo for the carnival parade. However, Wandeko Pipoca came to president's defense, claiming that calling him Bozo was a compliment and speaking out against demonstrations against him.

=== Mexican TV ===
In 1961, Mario Quintanilla, chairman of XEFB-TV Channel 3 obtained the local rights of the Bozo Cartoons, including the authorization of the Bozo characterization. José Marroquín (who later became famous with his Pipo character) was chosen as the first Mexican Bozo. He portrayed the character on local XHX-TV Channel 10 Monterrey television shows until 1963, when the licensing rights ended. After that, José Manuel Vargas Martínez, under sponsorship by Antonio Espino (famous comedy actor of the late 1940s and 1950s, known by his nickname, Clavillazo), portrayed the character. He was the most famous Bozo in Latin America and created his own version of Bozo's Circus, which traveled all along Latin America for decades. He started as a television artist participating in a dance marathon he won dressed as Bozo. After his success as Bozo, he traveled to several countries representing the Bozo character. He made special presentations in Italy, Greece, Spain, Hawaii and Canada with his circus. In 2000, he received the ANDA's Arozamena Award for 50 years of uninterrupted career. He died one year later, October 19, 2001, due to a lung disease.

In Mexico, television star, comedian and political commentator Víctor Trujillo created the character "Brozo, El Payaso Tenebroso" (Brozo, the Creepy Clown) in 1988 as a parody of Bozo for a TV Azteca program with Ausencio Cruz called La Caravana (The Caravan). He pleased the audience with double-entendres and adult humor, telling sarcastic and sometimes obscene versions of classic children's tales. Bozo once appeared as a guest in La Caravana. He became so popular that TV Azteca asked him to join the reporters and anchors during coverage of the FIFA World Cup in 1990, 1994 and 1998, also doing the same with Televisa for the 2002 World Cup. He also gave his commentary on the Olympics, starting with the 1992 Summer Olympics in Barcelona, Spain until the 2004 Summer Olympics in Athens, Greece. From 2000 to 2004, Trujillo as Brozo was the anchor of a popular and successful television news show, El Mañanero. It was first broadcast on Canal 40 XHTVM-TV and later Televisa's 4TV from 2001 onwards. Trujillo discontinued the Brozo character following the death of his wife, producer Carolina Padilla, but brought back Brozo in a new television program that began in early 2006 on Televisa's Canal de las Estrellas, "El Notifiero." He is considered an influential political commentator in Mexico.

=== Ronald McDonald ===
Immediately following Willard Scott's three-year-run as WRC-TV Washington, D.C.'s Bozo, the show's sponsors, McDonald's drive-in restaurant franchisees John Gibson and Oscar Goldstein (Gee Gee Distributing Corporation), hired Scott to portray "Ronald McDonald, the Hamburger-Happy Clown" for their local commercials on the character's first three television "spots". McDonald's replaced Scott with other actors for their national commercials and the character's costume was changed. One of them was Ray Rayner (Oliver O. Oliver on WGN-TV's Bozo's Circus), who appeared in McDonald's national ads in 1968. In the mid-1960s, Andy Amyx, performing as Bozo on Jacksonville, Florida, television station WFGA, was hired to do local appearances of Ronald McDonald periodically. Andy recalls having to return the wardrobe to the agency after each performance.

== Actors ==
The following is a partial list of Bozo television portrayers since the original (Pinto Colvig):

- Frank Avruch (1959–1970)

(Produced at WHDH-TV Boston 1965–1967 and syndicated to U.S. TV markets that were not producing their own local versions at the time, including New York City, Los Angeles & Washington, D.C. These were the only Bozo shows that were wholly owned and syndicated by Larry Harmon Pictures Corporation, 60 of which are currently available on worldwide DVD distribution entitled "Bozo The World's Most Famous Clown" Volumes 1 & 2.) On March 20, 2018, Avruch died at age 89 after a long fight against heart disease.

- Bob Bell (1960–1984) at Superstation WGN Chicago
- Joey D'Auria (1984–2001) at Superstation WGN Chicago

(WGN's signal-reach throughout North America included the U.S., Canada, Mexico, and the Caribbean among others. A 2005 retrospective titled Bozo, Gar & Ray: WGN TV Classics and 2019 special titled "Bozo's Circus: The 1960s" continue to air annually. WGN's Bozo show is recognized as the most popular and successful locally produced children's program in the history of television, boasting a 10-year-wait for studio audience reservations and over 40 years in production.)

=== Local TV Bozos ===
- Austin, Texas
  - James Franklin Davis III at KHFI-TV (now KXAN-TV)
- Baltimore, Maryland
  - Stu Kerr (1960s) at WMAR-TV
- Bangor, Maine
  - Mike Dolley (1962–1967) at WABI-TV
- Birmingham, Alabama
  - Bart Darby (1961–1962) at WBRC-TV
  - Ward McIntyre (1962–1968) at WBRC-TV
- Boston, Massachusetts
  - Frank Avruch (1959–1970) at WHDH-TV (now WCVB-TV)
- Buffalo, New York
  - Francis X Stack at WUTV-TV
- Belo Horizonte, Brazil
  - Jonas Santos (1980s) at TV Alterosa
  - Evandro Antunes (1980s) at TV Alterosa
- Brazil (national broadcasting based in São Paulo)
  - Wandeko Pipoca (1980–1981) at TV Record São Paulo and TVS Rio de Janeiro; at SBT (1981–1982)
  - Luis Ricardo (1982–1990) at SBT
  - Arlindo Barreto (1983–1986) at SBT
  - Marcos Pajé (now Marcos Fiel) (1983–1986) SBT
  - Luiz Leandro (1985–1986) at SBT
  - Edilson Oliveira (1986–1987) at SBT
  - Décio Roberto (1984–1991) at SBT
  - Paulo Seyssel (1980s) at SBT
  - André Luiz Sucesso (2007–2011, guest appearances) at SBT
  - Jean Santos (2012–2014) at SBT
  - Cláudio Siqueira (2025–Present) at SBT
- Charlotte, North Carolina
  - Jim Patterson (1962–1966) at WBTV
- Chicago, Illinois
  - Bob Bell (1960–1984) at WGN-TV
  - Joey D'Auria (1984–2001) at WGN-TV
- Cincinnati, Ohio
  - Bob Shreve (1965–1968) at WKRC-TV
- Dallas, Texas
  - (July–October 1968) KMEC-TV
- Dayton/Springfield, Ohio
  - David Eaton (July 1968–June 1970) at WSWO-TV (now WBDT)
- Denver, Colorado
  - Ned Austin (1959–1961) at KBTV (now KUSA-TV)
- Detroit, Michigan (see also Windsor, Ontario)
  - Bob McNea (1959–1967) at WWJ-TV (now WDIV-TV)
  - Jerry Booth (1967) at CKLW-TV (now CBET-DT)
  - Art Cervi (1967–1979) at CKLW-TV (now CBET-DT) (1967–1977) and WJBK-TV (1977–1979)
- El Paso, Texas
  - Howell Eurich (1968–1972) at KROD-TV (now KDBC-TV)
- Flint, Michigan
  - Earl Frank Cady (1967–1979) at WJRT-TV
- Fort Wayne, Indiana
  - Dan Berry (1987–1989)
- Grand Rapids, Michigan
  - Bill Merchant (August 1966 – 1968) at WZZM-TV
  - Dick Richards (1968–1999) at WZZM-TV
- Green Bay, Wisconsin
  - Jerry Drake (1960s) at WLUK-TV
- Jacksonville, Florida
  - Andrew H. Amyx (1961–1966) at WFGA-TV (now WTLV-TV)
  - Bill Boydston (1967–1975) at WFGA-TV (now WTLV-TV)

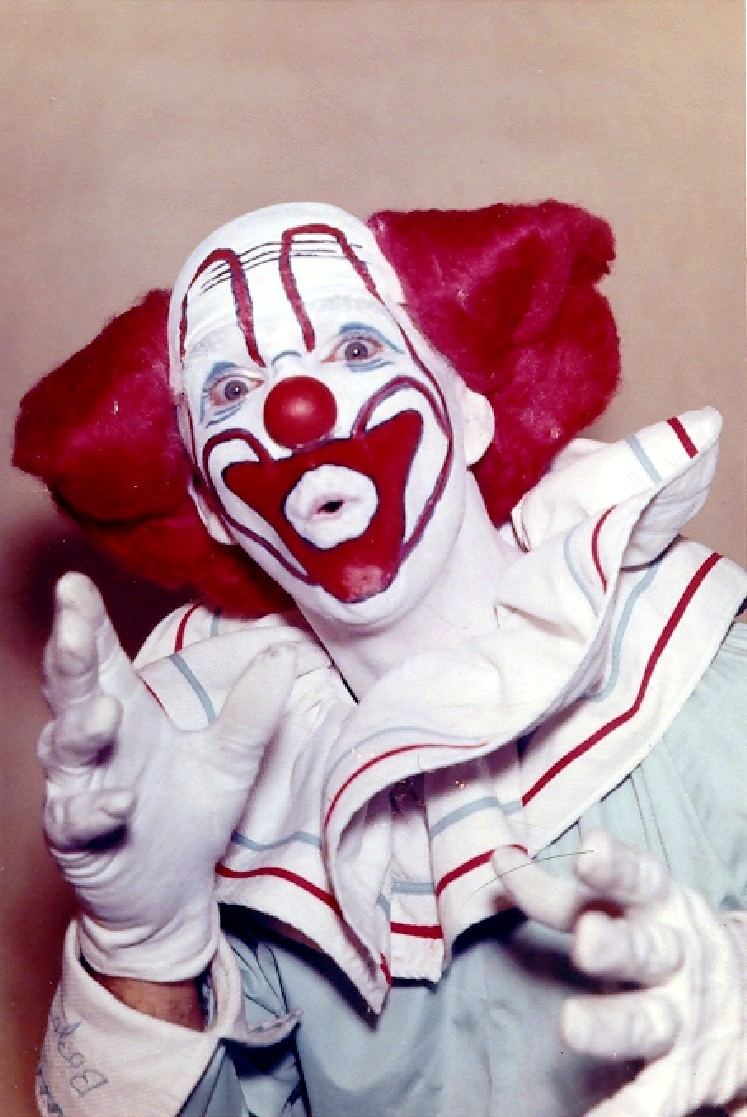
Roger Bowers as WJHL-TV Johnson City, Tennessee's Bozo.

- Johnson City, Tennessee
  - Roger Bowers (1960–1961) at WJHL-TV (Bowers used a ventriloquist dummy that looked like Bozo's "little pal Butchie" in the cartoons.)
- Knoxville, Tennessee
  - Johnny Mountain (1960s) at WTVK (now WVLT-TV)
- Little Rock, Arkansas
  - Gary Weir (1966–early 1970s) at KATV-TV; also (early 1980s–1989) at KARK-TV; also at KAIT-TV in Jonesboro, Arkansas (1970s–1980s); also at KLRT-TV in Little Rock in the late 1980s.
- Los Angeles, California
  - Syd Saylor (1950s at KTTV, the second Bozo the Clown after Pinto Colvig.
  - Vance Colvig Jr. (1959–1964) at KTLA-TV (son of the original Bozo the Clown)
- Memphis, Tennessee
  - Jim Chapin (1955-1956) at WHBQ-TV
- Mexico City
  - Jose Manuel Vargas (1960s–1990s) at Canal de las Estrellas
- Miami, Florida
  - Alan Rock (1968–1970) at WAJA-TV (now WLTV)
- Moline, Illinois
  - Keith Andrews (1967) at WQAD-TV
- Monterrey
  - Jose Marroquin (1961–1963) at XHX-TV
- Nashville, Tennessee
  - Tom Tichenor (1959) at WSM-TV (now WSMV-TV)
  - Dick Brackett (late 1959–1966) at WSM-TV (now WSMV-TV) (Tom Tichenor accepted a Broadway show opportunity and Dick Brackett took his place.)
  - Joe Holcombe (mid 1960s – late 1970s) at WSIX-TV (now WKRN-TV). His wife played Cousin Littlefoot, an Indian Maid Clown.
  - Jim Kent (late 1960 to early 1970s) at WSIX-TV (now WKRN-TV)
- New Bedford, Massachusetts
  - Bennett B. Schneider IV (1969–1971) at WTEV-TV (now WLNE-TV)
- New Orleans, Louisiana
  - Samuel "Sonny" Tustin Adams Jr. (1957–?) at WWL-TV
  - Rob Labby 1970's
- New York City, New York
  - Bill Britten (1959–1964) at WPIX-TV
  - Gordon Ramsey (1969–1970) at WOR-TV (now WWOR-TV)
- Orlando, Florida
  - Alan Rock (1971–1974) at WFTV-TV
- Paducah, Kentucky
  - DeWayne Spees at WPSD-TV
  - Dick Dyszel at WDXR-TV (now WKPD-TV)
- Philadelphia, Pennsylvania
  - Doug Wing (1969) at WTAF-TV (now WTXF-TV)
  - Craig Michael Mann (1970) at WTAF-TV (now WTXF-TV)
  - Deon Aumier (1989–1990) at WGBS-TV (now WPSG)
  - Bob McCone (1990–1994) at WGBS-TV (now WPSG)
- Pittsburgh, Pennsylvania
  - Deeny Kaplan at WPGH-TV
- Providence, Rhode Island
  - Jeremy Baker at WNAC-TV
- Raleigh, North Carolina
  - Paul Montgomery (1960–1961) at WRAL-TV
- Rio de Janeiro, Brazil
  - Charles Myara (1980s) at TVS Rio de Janeiro
  - Nanni Souza (1980s) at TVS Rio de Janeiro
- Richmond, Virginia
  - Jerry Harrell (until 1974) at WTVR-TV
- Salvador, Bahia, Brazil
  - Cau Alves (1980s) at TV Itapoan
- San Francisco, California
  - Tom Carroll (1968–1970) at KEMO-TV (now KOFY-TV)
- Shreveport, Louisiana
  - Joe Miot (1967–1968) at KTBS-TV
  - Terry MacDonald (now Mac McDonald) (1968) at KTBS-TV
  - Drew Hunter (1969–1970) at KTBS-TV
- Sioux Falls, South Dakota
  - Pat Tobin (1960–1962) at KSOO-TV (now KSFY-TV)
- Syracuse, New York
  - Mike Lattif (1971–1972) at WNYS-TV (now WSYR-TV)
- Toledo, Ohio
  - Jim Chaplin (1960s) at WSPD-TV (now WTVG)
- Minneapolis-St. Paul-Bloomington, Minnesota
  - Roger Erickson (c. 1959–63) at WCCO-TV
- Utica, New York
  - Ed Whittaker (early to late 1960s) at WKTV-TV
- Washington, D.C.
  - Willard Scott (1959–1962) at WRC-TV
  - Tony Alexi (1971–1972) at WDCA-TV
  - Dick Dyszel (1972–1977) at WDCA-TV
- Windsor, Ontario (see also Detroit, Michigan)
  - Jerry Booth (1967) CKLW-TV (now CBET-DT)
  - Art Cervi (1967–1977) at CKLW-TV (now CBET-DT)
- Worcester, Massachusetts
  - Tom Matzell (1970–1974) at WSMW-TV

== See also ==
- Bozo bit
- Bozo, Gar & Ray: WGN TV Classics
- Bozo: The World's Most Famous Clown
- Russell Scott, aka Blinky The Clown, of Denver, Colorado
- List of local children's television series (United States)
