= Metamorphosis: The Alien Factor =

1990 film

- Front VHS Cover
- Directed by: Glenn Takajian
- Written by: Glenn Takajian
- Produced by: Ted A. Bohus; Scott Morette; Ron Giannotto; Tony Grazia
- Starring: Matt Kulis; Patrick Barnes; Tara Leigh
- Cinematography: John Corso
- Edited by: Janice Keuhnelian
- Music by: John Gray
- Production companies: Movie Moguls Inc. Petrified Films Inc. Ted A. Bohus and Scott Morette Productions
- Distributed by: Trimark Pictures
- Release date: November 5, 1990; (Germany)
- Running time: 98 minutes
- Country: United States
- Language: English

Metamorphosis: The Alien Factor, also known as The Deadly Spawn II, is a 1990 American science fiction horror film written and directed by Glenn Takajian and produced by Ted A. Bohus.

== Plot ==
The Talos Corporation, a scientific research facility located in New Jersey, is tasked with experimenting on mysterious alien tissue provided by the United States government. Dr. Michael Foster and his lover Dr. Nancy Kane splice DNA from the tissue into laboratory animals, resulting in them mutating and becoming violent. While working on culturing the alien genes in a creature he named "Spot," Foster is bitten and infected with the DNA. Spot escapes into the building, and Foster falls ill. Over the following weeks, Foster undergoes a horrific, agonizing transformation while Kane and Dr. Elliot Stein search for a cure. They eventually devise a way to use "Agnes," an experimental particle accelerator, to reverse the infection. However, before they can do so, Foster completes his metamorphosis and is reborn as a grotesque creature. He escapes and kills Elliot, then also kills security guard John Griffen before disappearing.

Talos executive Dr. Viallini summons security officials Jarrett and Mitchell for a briefing on the situation. Kane advocates for keeping Foster alive so he can be cured, but Viallini believes he should be put to death for the good of the company. Meanwhile, Griffen's daughters Sherry and Kim become worried when they cannot reach him. They visit Talos with Sherry's boyfriend Brian, but Viallini lies to them, claiming Griffen never came into work.

Suspicious, Sherry, Kim and Brian sneak back into Talos and discover proof of Viallini's deception. Mitchell and Jarrett catch Sherry and Brian, but Foster appears, kills Jarrett and injures Brian. Sherry and Kim are cornered by Foster in a laboratory and manage to briefly stun him by throwing a vial of acid at him. Viallini, Mitchell and Kane arrive and open fire on Foster, allowing Kim and Sherry to escape with Mitchell, but the two scientists are killed.

As the Talos building undergoes an automatic lockdown, Mitchell guides Kim and Sherry to Agnes's chamber, intending to carry out Kane's plan to cure Foster. Kim and Mitchell lure Foster beneath the accelerator's generator; he attacks them both, but Sherry fires the beam before he can kill them. The radiation painfully reverses Foster's mutation, transforming him back into his human self. Mitchell reloads his gun and prepares to execute Foster, but Foster begins laughing in an inhuman way as his face deforms, and his mutant form's head rips from his mouth. Reverting back into the monster, Foster violently attacks and kills Mitchell by swallowing him. He then attempts to destroy the accelerator, but Sherry lowers the generator to pin him against the floor before firing the beam again, annihilating Foster once and for all.

With the crisis seemingly over, Kim and Sherry discover Brian is still alive. However, before the three can leave the Talos building, they encounter Spot, who has significantly matured. Spot escapes through the ceiling and bursts from the roof of the building, having grown to a gigantic size, and roars in triumph at its freedom.

== Cast ==
- Matt Kulis as John Griffen
- Patrick Barnes as Brian
- Tara Leigh as Sherry Griffen
- Dianna Flaherty as Kim Griffen
- Katherine Romaine as Nancy Kane
- Marcus Powell as Dr. Viallini
- Allen Lewis Rickman as Dr. Elliot Stein
- George G. Colucci as Dr. Michael Foster (credited as George Gerard)
- Tony Gigante as Mitchell
- Greg Sullivan as Jarrett

== Production ==
Following on the moderate success of 1983's The Deadly Spawn, Ted A. Bohus and partner Dr. Ron Giannotto chose to surpass this success with a sequel, but the storyline evolved into something different. Having a slightly larger budget than for 'Spawn', Metamorphosis: The Alien Factor began production in an abandoned Jersey City warehouse with exterior and some interior shots in a Hackensack office building using childhood friends and New Jersey and New York City locals.

== Release ==
=== Home media ===
The producers attempted to secure a theatrical release, but the film was ultimately released straight to video by Vidmark Entertainment on December 15, 1993 after playing at festivals and film markets beginning in 1990. Lionsgate re-released the film on October 13, 2003.

== Reception ==
TV Guide awarded the film 3/5 stars, writing, "The title may sound generic, but Metamorphosis: The Alien Factor is an unusually vivid and accomplished low-budget horror film, a science fiction chiller that stretches its budget well and whips up some solid frights." The Video Graveyard gave the film a negative review, calling it "Effects-laden trash", criticizing the special effects, script, and dialogue.
