= Nightbeast =

- Directed by: Don Dohler
- Written by: Don Dohler
- Produced by: Ted A. Bohus
- Starring: Donald Leifert; Tom Griffith; George Stover
- Cinematography: Richard Geiwitz
- Edited by: Don Dohler
- Music by: Jeffrey Abrams; Robert J. Walsh
- Distributed by: Troma Entertainment
- Release date: April 1982; (Baltimore screenings)
- Running time: 81 minutes
- Country: United States
- Language: English
- Budget: $14,000

Nightbeast is a 1982 American science fiction horror film directed by Don Dohler. The story concerns a small town sheriff who must stop a rampaging alien from killing the residents of Perry Hall, Maryland.

== Plot ==
A small alien spaceship is cruising around the Solar System. When it reaches the vicinity of Earth, it is struck by an asteroid and crashes at night in the small town of Perry Hall. Some hunters hear the impact and alert the county sheriff, Cinder. When they go investigating on their own, however, the pilot emerges and kills them with a disintegrator ray. The beast also attacks a couple in their home, and a family out for a drive.

Cinder confronts the beast with his men and some armed residents including a man named Jamie. However, the beast appears invulnerable to bullets and they lose many men to the disintegrator. The next morning, they enlist the help of an expert marksman who shoots off the disintegrator, disarming the beast. However, the marksman's son and another officer perish during the shootout.

The police department begin evacuating the town. However, they are unable to convince mayor Bert Wicker to cancel his party for governor Embry. Meanwhile, a delinquent named Drago abuses his girlfriend, who has been sleeping with Jamie. The police then arrive to give her the evacuation order, and after they leave, Drago returns and strangles the girl. When Cinder's police find out that Wicker's party is in progress, Jamie bluffs that poison gas is escaping from a nearby mine and the partygoers flee in panic. Wicker and his secretary Mary Jane, dispirited by this turn of events, stay home and begin drinking heavily.

At the office of doctor Steven Price, the beast appears and kills a few men. Price and nurse Ruth hide in the basement, and devise a trap to electrocute the beast with some frayed electrical cord. It works, and the beast flees the building. The body of Drago's girl gets discovered and taken to Price; Jamie, suspecting Drago, goes out on his dirt bike and beats him. Soon after, Cinder and his deputy Lisa discover a mutilated corpse, and the beast shows up. Lisa and Cinder make their escape, and the sheriff injures his leg in the process. Lisa takes him to her house to heal, and they have sex.

Meanwhile, Wicker and Mary Jane have gotten very drunk. Price is sent to watch over them until they can be evacuated. However, the beast gets past Price and kills Mary Jane in the basement. Her screams wake Wicker, and the beast rips his head off when he investigates. Cinder arrives afterwards, and Jamie suggests electrocuting the beast with a high-voltage coil from the local power plant. Price, thinking back to his success with the electrical trap, supports this course of action, and the sheriff drives out to the power plant with his men. There, Drago assaults Lisa and Cinder, but is stopped when Jamie shoots him with a shotgun.

Cinder and his crew return to Wicker's house and begin setting up their trap, laying metal wire between the trees and connecting it to the coil, which will discharge when they throw the circuit breakers. The beast takes them by surprise, and Jamie must hold onto the wire to keep it inside the trap. They throw the breakers, and the surge makes the beast explode, and takes Jamie with it as well. The camera pans up to the stars overhead and the film ends.

== Cast ==
- Tom Griffith as Sheriff Cinder
- Jamie Zemarel as Jamie Lambert
- Karin Kardian as Lisa Kent
- George Stover as Steven Price
- Don Leifert as Drago
- Anne Frith as Ruth Sherman
- Eleanor Herman as Mary Jane
- Richard Dyszel as Mayor Bert Wicker
- Greg Dohler as Greg
- Kim Pfeiffer as Kim (as Kim Dohler)
- Monica Neff as Suzie
- Glenn Barnes as Glenn
- Richard Ruxton as Governor Embry
- Bumb Roberts as Bill Perkins (as Bump Roberts)
- Don Dohler as Jimmy Perkins (as Don Michaels)
- David W. Donoho as Uncle Dave (as David Donoho)
- Richard Geiwitz as Pete
- Larry Reichman as Berkeley
- Christopher Gummer as Clay / Pool Party Guest / Beast (as Chris Gummer)
- Dace Parson as Wilton
- Richard Nelson as Krebs

== Production ==
Nightbeast features opening credit effects by Ernest D. Farino and the creature was created by John Dods.

The film was made for approximately $14,000.

J. J. Abrams worked on the film as a 16-year-old. Abrams became aware of Dohler from the latter's articles in a local film magazine, Cinemagic. After Dohler and Abrams exchanged correspondence, Dohler asked Abrams if he would be interested in scoring the film. While the film was shot in Baltimore, Maryland, Abrams, who lived in Los Angeles, mailed the tapes to Dohler.

The film substantially reworks the premise of Dohler's earlier The Alien Factor, replacing its three extraterrestrials with a single alien. Several actors from the earlier film returned, with some playing the same characters.

== Release ==
Dohler arranged midnight screenings of Nightbeast at a suburban Baltimore theater over a weekend in April 1982. Troma Entertainment later gave the film a limited domestic release in November 1982.

The film was first released on DVD on September 28, 2004, by Troma. It was reissued on DVD on February 24, 2009, along with Blood, Boobs & Beast, a documentary about Don Dohler's life and career.

In 2019, Vinegar Syndrome released Nightbeast on Blu-ray using a new 2K scan and restoration from the film's 16 mm camera original.

== Reception ==
TV Guide panned the film, awarding it one out of four stars, stating, "Although the special effects (including some startling uses of gore makeup) are noteworthy, the actors aren't given much to do other than stand around and talk. The final result is disappointing". Bill Gibron of DVD Talk rated it 2.5/5 stars and called it "an angry middle aged man's cry for attention". Mark L. Miller of Ain't It Cool News wrote, "All in all, Nightbeast is drive-in, beer-swilling, audience-heckling fun."

In August 2016, Nightbeast was featured on Rooster Teeth's Theater Mode web show.

== Legacy ==
Nightbeast has become a cult film. It is briefly seen playing on a television in Panos Cosmatos' 2018 film Mandy.
