= Ward McIntyre =

American broadcaster (1930–2007)

Walter Wharton "Ward" McIntyre Jr. (1930 – July 20, 2007) was an American television and radio personality from Birmingham, Alabama. A graduate of Ramsay High School and Birmingham–Southern College, he worked at WSGN radio before he was hired by WBRC in 1962 to take over as announcer, newscaster, and Bozo the Clown. He remained at the station until 1968, when he returned to radio, where he remained until his retirement from WBHM in the 1990s.
