= Emil Corsillo Inc =

Hairpiece manufacturer

Emil Corsillo Inc. was a US company that manufactured hairpieces; primarily for the entertainment industry.

== History ==
Emil was an Italian immigrant. Together with his wife, Elsie Koch, he founded Emil Corsillo Inc., the famous Hollywood company that for close to 50 years supplied the entertainment industry in with toupees, headpieces, wigs, and manufactured mannequin wigs.

Emil was the originator of the mannequin wig in the 1940s. The wigs were made from nylon. On September 6, 1950, Corsillo filed a patent for his wigs, in particular, the reinforced wig foundation frames (where the fake hair was attached). He was issued with Patent number: 2661749 in December 1953.

Most of the Hollywood actors that required a hairpiece were clients of the company. Among them were Bozo the Clown, Harpo Marx, Brian Donlevy, Hal Fishman, and many more.

Emil died in 1967, but the company continued on into the 1980s when it was closed. The decline in demand was attributed to new technologies and imports.
