= Bob McNea =

Canadian entertainer

- McNea c. 1971
- Born: 1929; St. Thomas, Ontario
- Died: November 5, 2005 (age 76); Kitchener, Ontario
- Known for: Moppets the Clown, Bozo the Clown, Oopsy the Clown

Robert J. McNea (1929 – November 5, 2005) was a Canadian entertainer, born in St. Thomas, Ontario, who was most famous playing a version of Bozo the Clown in the Detroit, Michigan version of the television franchise, and performed as his own character, Oopsy the Clown, in Detroit afterward and on the Canadian CTV television network

== Career ==
The son of a theater operator, McNea ran away to join the circus at age 14. While working here, he developed the character of Moppets the Clown. In the early days of television, from 1950 to 1959, he portrayed Moppets on WWJ-TV in Detroit. From 1959 to 1966, he played Bozo the Clown on Detroit television.

After a dispute between WWJ and Bozo's creator, Larry Harmon, the Detroit station ceased production of the Bozo show in 1966. McNea then played a new character, Oopsy the Clown, for WWJ and syndication, from 1967 to 1977. His wife Francis Kay, daughter Kathy Lynn and son Michael played human characters among puppets.

After the Oopsy show was cancelled in Detroit in 1977, McNea reprised the role in Kitchener, Ontario, for CKCO-DT and the CTV Television Network. He also operated Fantasy World Studios, a puppet theater, in a former Packard Motor showroom in Windsor, Ontario. He died in 2005 in Kitchener.
