= Ted A. Bohus =

American film director

- Born: United States
- Occupations: Film director, producer, actor, writer

Ted A. Bohus is an American film director, producer, actor and writer. He is best known for his work in low-budget independent films, most often in the horror genre.

His first film work was with the 1980s horror title Fiend where he acted as producer. He then produced two more horror movies, Nightbeast and Return of the Aliens:The Deadly Spawn, before he made his directorial debut with Regenerated Man in 1994. He also directed Vampire Vixens From Venus, and Destination Fame and co-wrote This Thing of Ours.

Bohus is also the editor and publisher of SPFX Magazine, a journal devoted to classic special-effects movies in the horror, science-fiction and fantasy genres.

== Filmography ==
=== As producer ===
- 1. Fiend (1980)
- 2. Nightbeast (1982)
- 3. The Deadly Spawn (1983)
- 4. Metamorphosis: The Alien Factor (1990)
- 5. Regenerated Man (1994)
- 6. This Thing of Ours (2003)
- 7. Destination Fame (2004)

=== As director ===
- Regenerated Man (1994)
- Vampire Vixens from Venus (1995)
- Destination Fame (2004)
- Hell on Earth (2008)

=== As writer ===
- This Thing Of Ours (2003)

=== As actor ===
- 1. The Deadly Spawn (1993) ... Medic #1
- 2. The Amityville Curse (V) (1990) ... Ghoul
- 3. Regenerated Man (1994) ... Thug
- 4. Vampire Vixens From Venus (1995) ... Man in Jeep
- 5. This Thing of Ours (2003) ... Teddy Alexander
