= Spookies =

1986 film

- Theatrical release poster
- Directed by: Brendan Faulkner; Thomas Doran; Eugenie Joseph
- Written by: Thomas Doran; Brendan Faulkner; Frank Farel; Ann Burgund (additional material)
- Produced by: Brendan Faulkner; Thomas Doran; Frank Farel; Eugenie Joseph
- Starring: Felix Ward; Dan Scott; Alec Nemser; Maria Pechukas
- Cinematography: Ken Kelsch; Robert Chappel
- Edited by: Eugenie Joseph
- Music by: James Calabrese; Kenneth Higgins
- Production companies: Twisted Souls Inc; Safir Films
- Distributed by: Sony Video Software Company
- Release dates: May 14, 1986 (France); March 8, 1987 (Hong Kong); January 22, 1988 (U.S.)
- Running time: 85 minutes
- Country: United States
- Language: English
- Box office: $17,785

Spookies is a 1986 American independent horror film directed by Brendan Faulkner and Thomas Doran, with additional footage directed by Eugenie Joseph. It stars Felix Ward, Dan Scott, Alec Nemser, and Maria Pechukas, and follows a group of partying adults who find an abandoned mansion and become trapped inside as a warlock tries to sacrifice the group with the intention of using their vitality to keep his wife alive.

The film was given a limited theatrical release in 1987, with a more widespread video release in the latter year, and also aired on cable television's USA Network multiple times between 1988 and 1991. Despite its limited release, modest box office haul and scarce availability, it has achieved a cult following since its release.

== Plot ==
A 13-year-old boy named Billy runs away from home after his parents forget his birthday. Making his way through thick woods, he encounters a drifter who is violently slashed to death after Billy leaves him. Billy stumbles upon an old mansion where a room is decorated for birthday celebrations. Thinking it is a surprise from his parents, he opens a present to discover a laughing severed head. Running away, he is attacked by the drifter's killer, a werecat with a hook on one hand, and subsequently buried alive.

Meanwhile, a group of teenagers and some older adults come across the mansion intending to have a party, believing the mansion to be abandoned. However, a warlock named Kreon resides there, keeping watch over his bride, Isabelle, whom he has kept preserved for over 70 years using an unrevealed method, but it is known that he needs human victims to do it. He possesses one of the teenagers in the group to use a Ouija board and summons a variety of monsters to kill the group one by one. These include muck men, small reptilian demons, giant spiders, an arachnid woman, an octopus-like creature with electric tentacles, a skeletal witch, a Grim Reaper statue, a vampiric boy in a monk's habit, and a large group of zombies.

Eventually, the monsters kill the entire group, and Kreon hopes to preserve his bride for longer, but she escapes by killing him and trying to outrun the zombie horde surrounding the mansion. The bride is eventually saved by a man who drives her away in his car. Kreon regenerates out of a tomb, as it is revealed that the man in the car is actually the werecat. The camera freezes on Kreon's laughing face, and the credits roll.

== Cast ==
- Felix Ward as Kreon
- Maria Pechukas as Isabelle
- Dan Scott as Kreon's Servant
- Alec Nemser as Billy
- A.J. Lowenthal as Korda / Son of Kreon & Isabelle
- Pat Wesley Bryan as Drifter
- Peter Dain as Peter
- Nick Gionta as Duke
- Lisa Friede as Carol
- Joan Ellen Delaney as Linda
- Peter Iasillo Jr. as Rich
- Kim Merrill as Meegan
- Charlotte Alexandra as Adrienne (Note: Credited as Charlotte Seeley)
- Anthony Valbiro as Dave
- Soo Paek as The Spider Woman
- Al Magliochetti as Lewis Wilson
- James M. Glenn as The Grim Reaper
- Gabriel Bartalos, Peter Delynn and John Beatty as Muck Men
- Robert Epstein as Graveyard Zombie

== Production ==
Spookies started out as a feature film entitled Twisted Souls, written and produced by Frank Farel, Brendan Faulkner, and Thomas Doran and directed by Faulkner and Doran. Principal photography for the film began at the Jay Estate in Rye, New York in late summer of 1984 and finished in October of that same year. Twisted Souls was being edited when creative and legal issues between the producers and the financial backer, Michael Lee (founder of UK-based home video distributor Vipco), prevented final post production work (editing, scoring, effects, etc.) from being carried out.

The original Twisted Souls footage directed by Faulkner and Doran consists of all the travelers who arrive in two cars and all the monsters and effects they encounter within the house. The monsters include: the demon Ouija girl, the muck men, the spider woman, the snake demons, the hallway demon, the Grim Reaper, and the first set of zombies seen outside earlier on in the film.

In 1985, Lee hired Eugenie Joseph to direct more footage, which was pieced together with the finished footage from Twisted Souls to create Spookies. The added scenes, written by Ann Burgund (under the name Joseph Burgund), feature an entirely different cast of characters, including Billy, the drifter, the werecat, Kreon, Isabelle, zombies (at the end of the film), the witch in the basement/cave and Korda. The film originally had a scene with Joe Niola playing a tramp named Jakey, sitting on a tombstone and talking to an imaginary friend, but it was cut and replaced with the Billy scene. Brian O'Hara was hired by Lee to create flatulence sound effects for the muck men, which Farel, Faulkner, Doran and the rest of the production crew disliked.

The creature and makeup effects were created by Gabe Bartalos, Arnold Gargulio, Jennifer Aspinall, Al Magliochetti, John Dods, Vincent Guastini, and others helping in various capacities. Richard Corben painted the cover art for the film.

== Reception ==
=== Box office ===
Spookies was given a limited theatrical release in the United States by Sony Video Software Company in January 1987 and grossed $17,785 at the box office. It was also released theatrically in Hong Kong.

=== Critical response ===
A contemporary review in Variety referred to Spookies as "a silly horror picture which contains some interesting special makeup effects, along with very amateurish ones". In his book The Gorehound's Guide to Splatter Films of the 1980s, Scott Aaron Stine gave the film a negative review, criticizing the "inept actors", "hackneyed script", and "hideous make-up effects".

In a retrospective review of the film, Meagan Navarro of Bloody Disgusting called it "nonsensical", but referred to Gabriel Bartalos' special effects work on the film as "impressive", writing: "There aren't a lot of horror films so daring as to cram as many weird rubber-suited monsters into one movie". Jay Bauman of Red Letter Media called the film a "boring Evil Dead". However, fellow member Rich Evans commended the "creative, different monsters" featured in the film, and fellow member Jack Packard similarly praised said creatures as "shockingly interesting".

=== Awards ===
In 1986, the film received the Delirium Award at the 15th Annual International Science Fiction & Film Fantasy Festival.

== Home media ==
The film was released on VHS in the U.S. by Sony Video but eventually went out of print. Spookies was also released on VHS in the UK by Palace Video, alongside Evil Dead 2, featuring artwork by Graham Humphries.

In 2003, Vipco released a Region 2 PAL DVD as part of their Vipco's Screamtime Collection series.

In 2017, the film was released on DVD by French company Intercontinental Film and Video under the title Les Spookie. Despite its French title, the audio language is English and the disc claims to be sourced from a new HD interpositive 2K scan. This DVD is playable in regions 1, 2 and 5.

In 2019, the Vinegar Syndrome label released Spookies on Blu-ray and DVD, marking the first time that Spookies has been released in the Blu-ray format. This two-disc release includes a 4K restoration of the film, along with two feature-length documentaries on the film and Vipco, and a number of other special features. It received a standard edition release, as well as two variant limited edition releases with slipcovers—one featuring artwork by Earl Kessler, and the other featuring art by Gary Pullin. The Vinegar Syndrome website also offered a limited edition LP record of the film's soundtrack on colored vinyl.

== Legacy ==
On September 19, 2015, the Hudson Horror Show festival held a 35 mm screening of Spookies (as a double feature with the 1978 film The Toolbox Murders) at the Alamo Drafthouse in Yonkers, New York, featuring appearances by stars Peter Iasillo Jr. and Anthony Valbiro in person.

A 35 mm print of the film was also screened by American Cinematheque on October 24 of that year at the 10th annual "Dusk-to-Dawn Horrorthon", held at the Aero Theatre in Santa Monica, California.

On October 17, 2022, Los Angeles film programmers Cinematic Void, partners of the American Cinematheque, held a 35 mm screening of Spookies at the Los Feliz Theatre.

In late 2023, the film was featured in the video game High on Life's DLC, High on Knife, where it is watchable in its entirety through the game's inter-dimensional cable feature. It was later featured again in the 2026 sequel, High on Life 2, where commentary by characters played by the members of RedLetterMedia talk over it in the game's movie theater feature.

On August 12, 2024, original co-writer Frank Farel announced on The Barrens Hideout podcast that he is in the early phases of developing an "anti-sequel" to the original film.
