= John Dodd (engineer) =

English engineer and creator of "The Beast"

- Dodd in front of "The Beast" Mark I, 1970s.
- Born: 13 December 1932
- Died: 6 December 2022 (aged 89); Hospital Quirónsalud, Marbella, Spain
- Citizenship: British, Spanish
- Occupations: Engineer, gearbox specialist
- Known for: Creating the 27-litre aero-engined car, "The Beast".
- Television: Featured with "The Beast" on Nationwide in 1974 and on Top Gear in 1998
- Criminal charges: Trademark infringement, exceeding 70 mph
- Spouse: 3
- Children: 9

John Dodd (13 December 1932 — 6 December 2022) was an English engineer, and automatic transmission specialist. Dodd was the creator of the aero-engined car, "The Beast", which featured in several television programmes, and received large-scale press coverage during Dodd's legal disputes with Rolls-Royce, over his use of the firms' radiator grill and Spirit of Ecstasy.

== Personal life ==
John Dodd was born on 13 December 1932 to Kathleen Kelleher and Arthur Moreton Dodd, although it was later proved that his biological father was William Harper. Dodd received little formal education, and was abandoned by Arthur Dodd at the age of ten. As a teenager, Dodd joined the RAF. Having initially been turned away due to his lack of education, Dodd managed to acquire the position of being a driver for a Polish World War II fighter ace, who could fly but not drive, and who taught Dodd to fly. Dodd later became a sentry guard at Kai-tak Airport in Hong Kong. Following his discharge from the military, Dodd found his interest in cars, after offering to help a chauffeur, whose Rolls-Royce had broken down.

Dodd was an engineer by trade, who specialised in automatic transmissions, the subject that would lead to him meeting Paul Jameson, from whom he purchased the basis of what would become "The Beast". Dodd learnt to pilot an aircraft at Croydon Airport, and later bought a Piper Apache which he stored at Biggin Hill Airport, in London. It was coming into land at Biggin Hill in around 1970, that Dodd would eventually meet Paul Jameson. In his earlier life, Dodd was only able to finance his flying hobby by making contacts with people at Biggin Hill, effectively promoting himself into a position he couldn't otherwise afford. Dodd, who was an eccentric, was known to fly under bridges, over his neighbour's houses, and would often practice touch-and-go manoeuvres, to the extreme of renting a Hawaiian aeroplane to attempt a such a manoeuvre at Pearl Harbor runway, only deterred by a radio-communicated threat of being shot-down. On one of his many European flights, Dodd decided that if he were to become ill, he would need a co-pilot, so he began to teach his daughters Anna and Suzanne to fly.

Despite making it clear that he thought "The Beast" was "better than any Rolls-Royce", Dodd owned several Rolls-Royce Silver Cloud and Silver Shadow models, which he used for towing cars, another one of his business ventures. John Dodd's son, Paul Dodd, reported that whilst towing a car at speed with one of his Silver Clouds, his father overtook a police-car before overtaking the criminals they were pursuing shortly after.

In the 1980s, Dodd faced severe fines and legal costs, having exhibited "The Beast" as a Rolls-Royce, subsequently being sued by Rolls-Royce for trademark infringement. Unable to pay the penalties, Dodd emigrated to Malaga, in Spain, taking "The Beast" with him, and marrying a third time. In Spain, Dodd started a vehicle maintenance business from his workshop near Malaga Airport, later using the workshop to recondition Rolls-Royce and Bentley transmissions. In a 2016 interview, Dodd said that since moving to Spain, he had "learnt to windsurf, waterski, and do all sorts of things that he'd never have done otherwise".

Dodd married three times, and prior to emigrating, lived at 8 Links Road, Epsom, in Surrey. He died at The Hospital Quirónsalud, on 6 December 2022, aged 89.

== The Beast ==
"The Beast" is a kit-car, which has existed in two variations, usually referred to as "Mark I" and "Mark II". Initially built around a 27-litre Rolls-Royce Meteor engine (as fitted to several World War II tanks) and latterly fitted with a non-supercharged 27-litre MK35 Rolls-Royce Merlin engine, along with the more commonly known Mark II shooting-brake body, which Dodd had commissioned using insurance compensation after the Mark I caught fire in Sweden.

In 1966 Paul Jameson began the construction and testing of a prototype aero-engined vehicle, which would later form the foundations of Dodd's "Beast". It was after landing his plane at Biggin Hill in around 1970, that Dodd first met Jameson, who had been testing a prototype aero-engined vehicle on the runway, subsequently resulting in mechanical failure. Jameson explained to Dodd of his struggle to find a gearbox which could withstand the immense torque of the Rolls-Royce Meteor engine which was fitted to the vehicle. Following their meeting, Dodd designed a torque-converter system coupled to a GM TH400 three-speed automatic transmission, which enabled the transfer of the engines' torque to the rear wheels.

=== "The Beast" Mark I ===
In around 1971, one year after their meeting, Dodd bought the Meteor-equipped chassis from Jameson for around £400. (Note: £400 in 1971 equates to approximately £5,000 in 2025, according to calculations based on the Consumer Price Index measure of inflation.) By 1972, Dodd had completed the construction of the Mark I, which had a dark-red, Ford Capri inspired body-shell, built from fibreglass. It used the windscreen from a Jensen Interceptor, and the rear window from a Reliant Scimitar. The rear axle was a Jaguar IRS unit sourced from an XJ12, while the front axle, suspension, and non-assisted steering was shared with an Austin A110 Westminster. The car was also fitted with a Rolls-Royce radiator grill, anointed with the Spirit of Ecstasy, which would later arise in a court-case against Dodd. At this time, BP paid Dodd £2,000 (Note: £2000 in 1972 equates to approximately £24,000 in 2025, according to calculations based on the Consumer Price Index measure of inflation.) to display their logo on "The Beast". Dodd referenced this is a 2016 interview, asserting "I still take her out regularly – although not quite as often as I used to, as it does around 2mpg and BP no longer pays the fuel bill".

In 1973, "The Beast" was verified by the Royal Automobile Club, as capable of achieving a conservative 183 mph. In 1977, The Guinness Book of Records would certify "The Beast" as the world's most powerful road-car. The car also featured in the publication holding the record for the fasted towing of a caravan, recorded at Silverstone at 107.5 miles per hour. In April 1973, Dodd featured in Hot Car with the Mark I "Beast". In February 1974, Dodd and "The Beast" featured on the BBC programme, Nationwide, where Dodd conservatively estimated "The Beast's" build-cost at £10,000, (Note: £10,000 in 1972 equates to approximately £118,000 in 2025, according to calculations based on the Consumer Price Index measure of inflation.) and stated that he estimated the car's value at £56,000. (Note: £56,000 in 1974 equates to approximately £531,000 in 2025, according to calculations based on the Consumer Price Index measure of inflation.) In the interview, Dodd noted that "The Beast" was capable of accelerating from 0-70 in around three seconds, and rated the engine as capable of 700 hp at the flywheel.

In March the same year, having driven "The Beast" to a Swedish car show, Dodd was requested to meet The King of Sweden, who wanted to see "The Beast" but had been unable to attend the show. Upon driving back from the meeting, "The Beast" caught fire, destroying the fibreglass body, leaving only the chassis intact.

=== "The Beast" Mark II ===
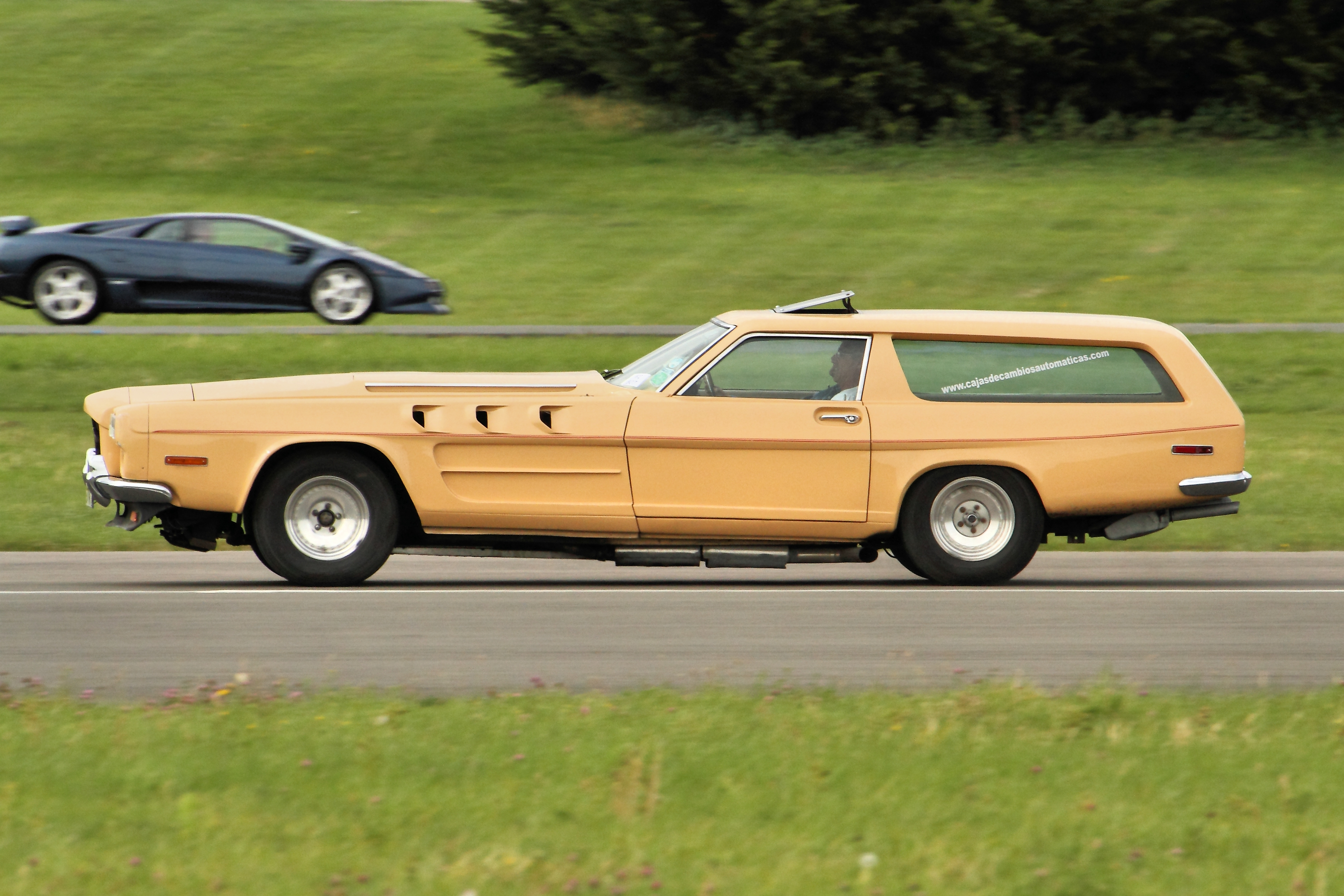
"The Beast" at the 2014 Wings and Wheels Show, Dunsfold Aerodrome.

Following the fire of the Mark I variation, Dodd used his £17,000 (Note: £17,000 in 1974 equates to approximately £161,000 in 2025, according to calculations based on the Consumer Price Index measure of inflation.) insurance pay-out to rebuild "The Beast". The second incarnation featured the more commonly known 19-foot shooting-brake fibreglass body-shell, which the car retains today. The new body-shell, with the Rolls-Royce radiator grill still present, was reminiscent of a dragster, as Dodd commissioned it to be built by Roy Phelps of "Fibreglass Repairs", in Kent, who specialised in building bodies for drag-race use. Dodd also used his insurance compensation to replace the tank-destined Rolls-Royce Meteor engine, with a non-supercharged Mk35 Rolls-Royce Merlin engine, taken from a Boulton Paul Balliol Training Plane. Dodd claimed the new engine to be capable of 950 bhp, and 760 lb/ft of torque, at 2500rpm and 1000rpm respectively.

In May 1981, "The Beast" Mark II was featured in Street Machine, with Dodd being interviewed by Mike Collins. When asked if he had driven "The Beast" to the interview location, Dodd answered:

Yes, oh yeah. Bloody traffic all the way. You know, it was no trouble. Quite honestly, it took an hour and twenty minutes really. If you could get everything out of the way, I could do it in bloody thirty minutes ... I found a clear bit, and I whacked it down to second, and took it up to a hundred and forty - then I put it back up to top.

— John Dodd, Street Machine

In 1998, "The Beast" featured in an episode of Top Gear in which Steve Berry drove the car, and interviewed John's son, Paul Dodd.

In his later life, Dodd commissioned Currie Performance to modify a Ford nine-inch rear axle, which reduced the theoretical top speed to around 200 mph, in view of achieving a competitive run at Santa Pod Raceway. However, Dodd did not manage to fit the new axle prior to his death, with it being installed later, in preparation for the sale of "The Beast".

==== Legal Disputes ====
In October 1974, Dodd was arrested after fleeing from a police car in excess of 100 mph along 21-miles of the A1, in Northamptonshire, only stopping due to a road block. Dodd, who allegedly originally planned to plead not-guilty, appeared in court on 29 September 1975, having missed the earlier hearing after his Rolls-Royce Silver Shadow broke-down in Paris. Following the hearing, Dodd received a six-month driving disqualification, was fined £75, and ordered to pay £25 in costs.

In 1981, Rolls-Royce accused Dodd of trademark infringement, due to his unlawful use of the Rolls-Royce radiator grill on both variants of "The Beast", and exhibiting the car as a Rolls-Royce. On 8 April 1981, Dodd drove "The Beast" to London High Court, faking a break-down on Fleet Street to gain media attention. In an interview on Fleet Street, Dodd stated "It's fine for bombing down motorways, but it couldn't cope with the rush-hour". During the court hearing, the Judge, Mr Justice Dillon, accused Dodd of having a "cavalier attitude", and made him promise that he would not use or exhibit the car until the next hearing, and that if interviewed by the press, he would only refer to it as "The Beast". Furthermore, Rolls-Royce's counsel, Mr George Hamer, told the Judge that the company had had disputes with Dodd dating from 1968.

On 14 April 1981, upon the second hearing, Dodd arrived at court on horseback, in view of keeping his promise not to use or exhibit "The Beast". In an interview to the press, Dodd stated "I decided on one horse-power, rather than 796... The joke of it is, I think the journey on horseback took about the same time as the journey last week in the car". During this hearing, despite Dodd refusing to renew his promise, the Judge, Mr Justice Walton, ordered him to adhere to the agreement until the full hearing. The Judge also granted Rolls-Royce temporary court orders to ban Dodd from infringing their trademarks, and exhibiting "The Beast" as a Rolls-Royce.

On 17 June 1981, Dodd appeared in court for the final hearing of the case. During the hearing, Rolls-Royce asked the Judge, Mr Justice Whitford, for Dodd to be jailed for three breaches of the April injunction, in which all parties agreed that Dodd would not use or exhibit "The Beast". Since then, the car had been seen on the road, and Dodd had taken it to a "custom-car show". Dodd apologised to the court for breaching the injunction, stating "I must apologise, my Lord. I am not the sort of person who would abuse the Judge's orders", after which he was ordered to pay a £5,000 fine, and an estimated £5,000 for the legal-cost of the case. Dodd later revealed that he had to pay between £17,000 and £18,000 (Note: £18,000 in 1981 equates to approximately £69,000 in 2025, according to calculations based on the Consumer Price Index measure of inflation.) in fines and legal fees, resulting in the repossession of his Piper Apache aircraft.

After losing the case to Rolls-Royce, Dodd removed the radiator grill, Spirit of Ecstasy, and any other Rolls-Royce badging, instead fitting the car with a radiator grill marked "JD": John Dodd. Facing severe legal costs, Dodd was forced to emigrate to Malaga, Spain, taking "The Beast" with him.

=== Sale of "The Beast" ===
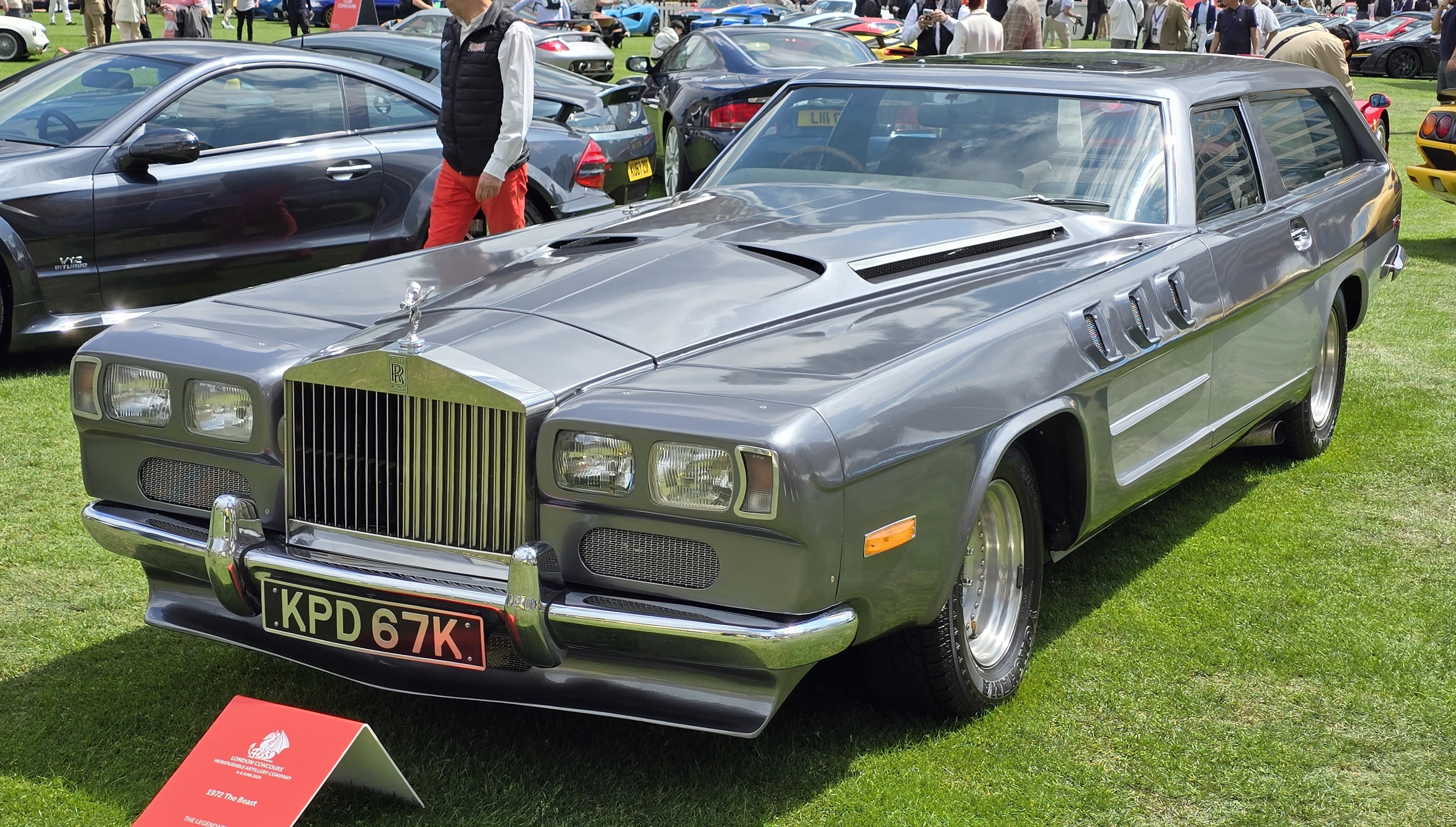
"The Beast" in its current guise, presented at the 2024 London Concours.

Following Dodd's death in 2022, his family decided to sell "The Beast" so that it would "go to somebody who will use it". By this stage, the car had made its way back to Britain once again, as Dodd had wanted to attempt to achieve a sub-nine-second run at Santa Pod Raceway.

The car was sold via a Car & Classic online auction, listed with no reserve. The sale gained significant media attention, beginning on 9 March 2023 and ending on 16 March 2023, with a winning bid of £72,500. Since then, the new owner has re-fitted "The Beast" with a Rolls-Royce radiator grill and Spirit of Ecstasy, and repainted over the original Mark II paintwork, described by Jonny Smith as "prosthetic limb beige".

== Notes ==
=== Website ===
- Clark, Gregory (2023). "The Annual RPI and Average Earnings for Britain, 1209 to Present (New Series)". MeasuringWorth.
