= Devil Fetus =

1983 Hong Kong film by Lau Hung Chuen

- Original Hong Kong release poster
- Directed by: Lau Hung-chuen
- Written by: Wen-Hua Cheng; Ging-Jiu Lo
- Produced by: Lo Wei
- Starring: Shirley Lu; Lau Dan; Eddie Chan
- Cinematography: Lau Hung-chuen
- Edited by: David Wu
- Production company: Lo Wei Motion Picture Company
- Distributed by: Golden Harvest
- Release date: 7 September 1983 (Hong Kong)
- Running time: 86 minutes
- Country: Hong Kong
- Language: Cantonese
- Box office: HK$ 3,920,445

Devil Fetus (魔胎) is a 1983 Hong Kong horror film directed by Lau Hung Chuen.

== Plot ==
A woman buys an antique vase, which contains a demon that is unleashed to cause mayhem and take possession of people it encounters.

== Cast ==
- Eddie Chan as Kent Cheng
- Pak-Kwong Ho as Mr. Cheng
- Hsiu-Ling Lu as Juju
- Ouyang Sha-fei as Granny Cheng
- Lau Dan

== Production ==
The soundtrack of the film includes "La Petite Fille de la Mer" from the Vangelis album L'Apocalypse des animaux (1973). It also contain samples from Ennio Morricone's soundtrack for the John Carpenter film The Thing.

== Style ==
John Charles, author of The Hong Kong Filmography 1977–1997 referred to the film as part of Hong Kong's "early '80s gross-out cycle" of horror films.

== Release ==
Devil Fetus premiered on 7 September 1983 in Hong Kong. It grossed a total of HK$3,920,445. Part of the film's more gruesome moments were cut by Hong Kong censors.

== Reception ==
Author John Charles referred to the film as "silly but amusing" and stated that the special effects in the film "are too ambitious for the budget". Arty Flores from HorrorNews.net gave the film a positive review, calling it "a whacked out hilarious, what the hell is going on, freaky cult film". Jay Seaver from eFilmCritic awarded the film a negative 2/5 stars, calling it "Hilariously dated", and criticized the film for its incomprehensible plot.
