= Douglas McKeown =

American filmmaker, actor, and writer (born 1947)

Douglas McKeown (January 14, 1947 - September 9, 2022) was an American filmmaker, actor, and writer, best known as the screenwriter and director of the sci-fi horror film, The Deadly Spawn (1983). He died in New York City on September 9, 2022.

== Early life and education ==
McKeown was born in New York City and raised in Metuchen, New Jersey. As a child he taught himself the art of horror makeup, gaining notoriety by terrorizing local neighborhoods. He graduated from Emerson College in 1968 with high honors, having studied cinematography and theater in addition to English literature.

== Career Choices ==
After a brief stint as an Editorial Coordinator at ABC-TV in New York City, he spent six years as a high school teacher, numbering among his students the future writer and movie director Richard Wenk, stage director Lonnie Price, magician-illusionist David Copperfield, and animation producer Tom Ruegger. During this period he directed a series of musicals and straight plays for school, community theatre, and summer stock.

In 1976, McKeown left teaching to join the Jean Cocteau Repertory in New York as an actor. He quickly moved on to other challenges, creating designs for many plays there, including sets and costumes for the Cocteau’s world premiere of Tennessee Williams’ Something Cloudy, Something Clear, and staging a number of productions, notably poet Robert Lowell’s adaptation of The Oresteia of Aeschylus.

Following the release of "The Deadly Spawn" in 1983, McKeown shot a number of short video documentaries in Los Angeles, Philadelphia, and New York. One of these, a promotional video for New York’s LGBT Center, ultimately led him to his ongoing role as facilitator of the storytelling workshop, Queer Stories. He compiled and edited Queer Stories for Boys (Thunder's Mouth Press, 2004), an anthology of writings by members of the workshop.

Beginning in 2004, he returned to the stage as an actor after a hiatus of twenty-four years, joining the Phoenix Theatre Ensemble for their productions of Kafka’s The Trial and Anouilh’s Antigone.

== Publications and Films ==
- The Deadly Spawn, 1983/2004, DVD, Synapse Films
- Queer Stories for Boys, 2004, ISBN 1560256508
