= Aero Theatre =

Movie theater in Santa Monica, California, United States

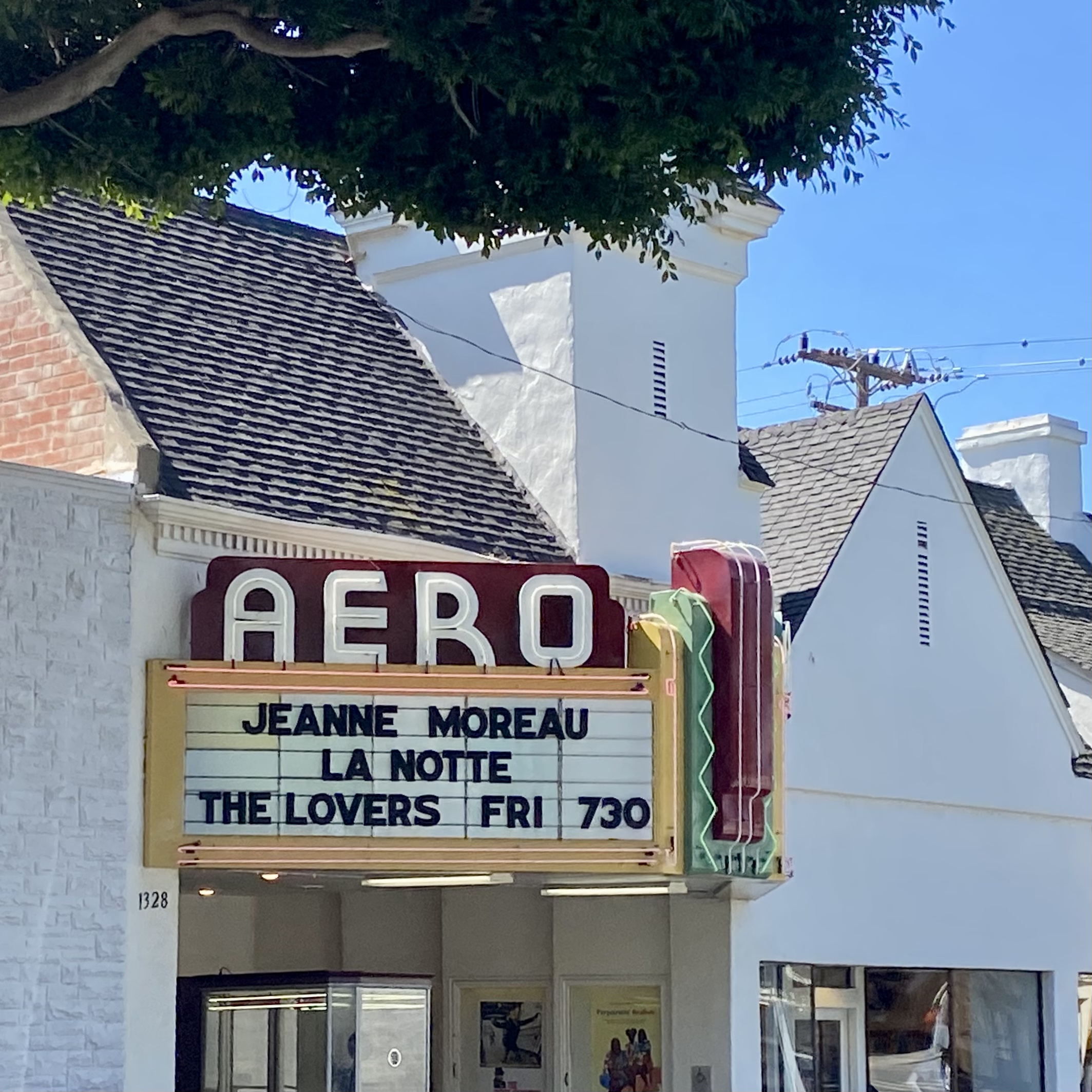
- Interactive map of Aero Theatre
- Full name: Max Palevsky Aero Theatre
- Address: 1328 Montana Avenue
- Location: Santa Monica, California, United States
- Owner: J.S. Rosenfield & Co.
- Operator: American Cinematheque
- Capacity: 425
- Type: Movie theater
- Event: Film

Construction
- Built: June 19, 1939
- Opened: May 15, 1940

Website
- americancinematheque.com/about/theatres/aero-theatre

The Aero Theatre is a single-screen movie theater in Santa Monica, California, built in 1939 and opened in 1940.

== History ==
Named in tribute to the aerospace industry, the Aero Theatre was built in 1939 for aviation pioneer Donald W. Douglas of the Douglas Aircraft Company to serve as a 24-hour movie house for his employees at a nearby plant. Designed by P.M. Woolpert, the French Normandy-style theater cost $45,000 ($1.04 million in 2025) to construct and originally seated 678.

By the late 1980s, the Aero was one of Los Angeles' last repertory theaters, regularly programming double features. However, by the end of the 1990s, the theater, then owned by Chris Allen, had fallen on hard times. Robert Redford, who spent time at the Aero growing up, attempted to buy the theater for Sundance Cinemas in 2001, but the deal was never completed and the theater closed in April 2003.

In January 2005, the theater reopened as the Max Palevsky Aero Theatre, after renovations were made by the American Cinematheque. The $1 million ($1.65 million in 2025) renovation included a new 44x17 foot screen, larger and more comfortable seats (reducing capacity to 427), and a new concession stand. The Cinematheque had previously overseen a $12.8 million ($25.7 million in 2025) renovation of Grauman's Egyptian Theatre in Hollywood, and the organization subsequently programmed both theaters.

In 2006, the theatre began hosting the Dusk-to-Dawn Horrorthon, an overnight, six-to-seven horror film marathon. The event is held every year in October.

The Aero underwent renovation again in 2019 and 2021, including improvements to projection, sound, and the general facility.

== In popular culture ==
Aero Theatre has made appearances in several films, including 10 to Midnight (1983), Masquerade (1988), Sleepwalkers (1992), Get Shorty (1995) and Donnie Darko (2001).

Alternative rock band Weezer referenced the Aero in their song "Aloo Gobi", the second track on their 2021 album OK Human. Weezer frontman Rivers Cuomo resides in Santa Monica and wrote the song about a typical date he would go on with his wife Kyoko.
