= The Deadly Spawn =

1983 science fiction horror film

- Theatrical release poster
- Directed by: Douglas McKeown
- Written by: Douglas McKeown
- Produced by: Ted A. Bohus
- Starring: Charles George Hildebrandt; Tom De Franco; Richard Lee Porter; Jean Tafler; Karen Tighe; Ethel Michelson; John Schmerling; James Brewster; Elissa Neil
- Cinematography: Harvey M. Birnbaum
- Edited by: Marc Harwood
- Music by: Michael Perilstein
- Distributed by: 21st Century Film Corporation
- Release date: April 22, 1983
- Running time: 78 minutes
- Country: United States
- Language: English
- Budget: $25,000

The Deadly Spawn is a 1983 American science fiction horror film written and directed by Douglas McKeown, and produced by Ted A. Bohus. The film's plot centers on a meteor that lands on Earth, which unleashes a carnivorous alien that finds refuge in the basement of a house. As it grows larger, a young monster movie fan named Charles (Charles George Hildebrant) and group of others try to survive against the creature and its offspring.

The Deadly Spawn was shot in New Jersey on 16 mm film. The house in which the majority of the film takes place belonged to illustrator Tim Hildebrandt, who also served as an executive producer on the film. John Dods served as associate producer and special effects director; the effects work involved wire-controlled rubber puppets.

Upon its release, in some territories, the film's title was changed to Return of the Aliens: The Deadly Spawn or The Return of the Alien's Deadly Spawn in an attempt to capitalize on the worldwide success of the 1979 film Alien.

== Plot ==
Two campers are nearby when a meteor falls to Earth. When they investigate, they are attacked and eaten by a lifeform that emerges from the crashed rock.

A house near the crash site is the home of Sam and Barb, who are set to venture out of town, and their two children, college student and budding scientist Pete and his younger brother Charles, a monster movie fan. When a rainstorm sets in, Sam goes downstairs to check the basement for flooding and is eaten by the bizarre monstrosity. Barb suffers the same fate when she goes looking for him. Visiting are Aunt Millie and Uncle Herb, who think Sam and Barb have left for their trip.

Pete sets up a study date with classmates Ellen, Frankie, and Kathy. Uncle Herb, a psychologist, and also preparing for a conference, wants to investigate Charles' interest in the macabre, and he holds a brief session with the boy before he falls asleep in the living room. Aunt Millie heads over to her mother Bunny's house for a luncheon with her retired friends. When an electrician arrives to investigate a circuit breaker malfunction in the basement, Charles dons a costume and goes down to scare him. There, he discovers the basement is infested with slug-like creatures feasting on the electrician's and his mother's remains, guarded by their huge mother, the monster from the meteor crash. After realizing that the eyeless creatures react to sound, he stands silently, escaping his parents' fate.

Meanwhile, Ellen and Frankie have discovered one of the tadpole creatures dead on the way over to the house, and deem it unlike any animal on Earth when they dissect it. Frankie hypothesizes that the creature could be from outer space, but the hard-nosed Pete dismisses that theory. At Bunny's house, Millie arrives and they prepare the luncheon, unaware that the spawn have infested the house. When her guests arrive, the spawn creatures emerge and attack them. The women fight back and manage to escape in Millie's car.

Back at the house, Pete, Ellen and Frankie seek out Uncle Herb to get his opinion on the creatures, only to find him being devoured by the spawn. As the adult creature emerges and charges them, they run upstairs to barricade themselves in Charles's bedroom. Charles distracts the adult by turning on a radio, which it eats, causing an electrical fire which burns it. Pete and the others then see Kathy arriving and pull her into the bedroom just in time to save her from the beast. The teens decide to head for Pete's bedroom, where there is a phone to call for help, but as they emerge, the adult creature pounces on them. Pete flees to another room and from there onto the roof; Frankie and Kathy run up to the attic, while Ellen stays in Charles' room. The creature breaks down the door, bites Ellen's head off and throws her body out the window. Pete returns through the attic window; but traumatized after seeing Ellen's body as well as his parents' car, the latter signaling to him they never left for their trip, he becomes unhinged, fighting with Frankie to open the attic door, which attracts the creature.

Meanwhile, Charles has concocted a plan: he has filled a prop head with explosive flash powder, with a frayed electrical cord trailing behind to act as a fuse. He arrives in the attic before the creature can attack Pete and the others, spurring the creature into devouring the prop head. However, the cord proves too short to plug into an outlet. One of the spawn creatures appears and attacks Charles, but gets in the way of the adult when it lunges at Charles and ends up being eaten. Now that the monster is distracted and its mouth close enough, Charles manages to get to the outlet, igniting the powder and blowing up the adult.

With the threat revealed, a massive hunt is mobilized. Policemen and townspeople go around killing the alien spawn and burning the remains. Millie returns to the house to care for Pete and Charles as best she can, while we see Frankie and Kathy sitting in the back of a police vehicle. Pete, very catatonic, is put into an ambulance. Millie and Charles leave with some officers in the back of a police car. That night, a lone patrolman stands guard outside the house. His contact on the CB radio is confident that the spawn has been wiped out, but then the patrolman hears a low rumbling, and sees the hill by the house lift up, revealing a fully-grown spawn of colossal size.

== Cast ==
- Charles George Hildebrant as Charles
- Tom De Franco as Pete
- Richard Lee Porter as Frankie
- Jean Tafler as Ellen
- Karen Tighe as Kathy
- James Brewster as Sam
- Elissa Neil as Barb
- Ethel Michelson as Aunt Millie
- John Schmerling as Uncle Herb
- Judith Mayes as Bunny

Producer Ted A. Bohus appears as a medic.

== Production ==
Producer Ted Bohus said that he conceived the idea for The Deadly Spawn in 1979, and that he was inspired by an article in National Geographic about seed pods that were recovered from the Arctic. According to Bohus, he created an initial creature design that involved a man in a suit, but associate producer and effects director John Dods was unenthusiastic about that prospect. Several days later, Dods returned with several alternatives, including the "Mother Spawn" that was eventually used in the film.

Actor and director Tim Sullivan got his start in film as a 15-year-old production assistant on The Deadly Spawn. Dods was the brother of Sullivan's art teacher, and Sullivan earned the chance to work on the film as a result of that relationship. Among other tasks, Sullivan assisted in the manipulation of the main spawn puppet, which was made of rubber and controlled from below by wires.

=== Filming ===
Much of the film was shot in Gladstone, New Jersey; New Brunswick; and the Palisades Park home of the producer. It was shot on 16 mm film.

== Music ==
The film score by Michael Perilstein was released by Perseverance Records on December 21, 2004. AllMusic awarded it 3.5 out of 5, with reviewer Jason Ankeny describing it as an "innovative score" that "deserves greater notoriety". Ankeny praised its atmosphere, and said that it successfully reached a "balance between serious musical aspirations and the tongue-in-cheek demands of the material".

== Reception ==
AllMovie's Fred Beldin described the film as an "engaging, exciting sci-fi/horror adventure with realistic characters, effective acting and a willingness to betray expectations." In 2018, Meagan Navarro of Bloody Disgusting called the film "one of the most surprising, gory creature features of the decade", writing that, "thanks to fantastic creature designs and effects by Dods and his team, a relentless dedication to gore and carnage, and an extreme sincerity at heart, there's a lot to love with The Deadly Spawn."

== Box office information ==
Per Variety, the film reached No. 11 at the weekly US box office.

== Sequel ==
Bohus went on to produce the 1990 film Metamorphosis: The Alien Factor, also known as The Deadly Spawn II. Its concept and plot are not related to the 1983 film.
