= Don Dohler =

American film director (1946–2006)

- Born: 27 January 1946; Baltimore, Maryland, U.S.
- Died: December 2, 2006 (aged 60); Perry Hall, Maryland, U.S.
- Occupations: Film director, screenwriter, film producer, cartoonist
- Spouses: Pam Merenda (m. 1965; died 1992); Lynn Eschenbach (m. 1996); Leslie McFarland (m. 2006)

Donald Michael Dohler (January 27, 1946 – December 2, 2006) was an American film director known for making low-budget science fiction and horror films, as well as his work in underground comix and publishing.

== Biography ==
=== Early life ===
Dohler was born in Baltimore, Maryland. When he was a child, his mother bought him a film projector and one day he drew stick figures on a piece of scotch tape. He ran the tape through the projector and just before the tape burned up inside of the projector, he saw the animated figure dance on the wall and that's when he knew he wanted to make films.

=== Publishing ===
==== WILD and ProJunior ====
In 1961, at the age of 15, Dohler started a Mad-style fanzine called WILD. Mad had Alfred E. Neuman as a mascot, so Dohler used his middle-school creation, Pro Junior, as WILD’s mascot. In WILD’s peak, it had contributors such as Jay Lynch, Art Spiegelman, and Skip Williamson, who later went on to be famous in the underground comix movement of the late 1960s and early 1970s. In the early 1970s Jay Lynch and Art Spiegelman were fooling around and they started drawing WILD’s mascot, ProJunior, again, but this time in a leopard skin leotard. Robert Crumb saw ProJunior and decided to draw a comic about him. As a result, Lynch rounded up 22 underground comix artists, including Dohler, to draw their own interpretation of ProJunior, which was published by Kitchen Sink Press in a comic in 1971.

==== Cinemagic ====
In the mid-1960s Dohler came up with an idea for a magazine for filmmakers. It would feature illustrated step-by-step articles for amateur special effects filmmakers. Inspired by his underground comix friends, Dohler set off to publish the magazine on his own. Cinemagic featured articles by industry professionals and went on for 11 issues before being purchased by Starlog in 1979. Cinemagic inspired several young filmmakers who later went on to have successful careers in Hollywood, including J. J. Abrams, Tom Sullivan, Ernie Farino, Michael Trcic and Al Magliochetti.

==== Other projects ====
Fresh off the success of Cinemagic and his own burgeoning filmmaking career, Dohler wrote two books in 1979-1980: Film Magic: The Fantastic Guide to Special Effects Filmmaking (Cinema Enterprises, 1979) and the two-volume Stop Motion Animation: A Complete Step-By-Step Guide (Cinema Enterprises, 1980).

In the 1990s, he returned to publishing, putting out Amazing Cinema and Movie Club magazines. He supplemented his income at various times as editor of the (Baltimore county) Times-Herald and as editor of the Harford Business Ledger.

=== Filmmaking ===
Dohler's first film, the science fiction B movie The Alien Factor, was released in 1978. The story begins with a young teenage couple making out in a car when an insect-looking monster attacks. The local sheriff must find out what's causing the killings while the mayor is breathing down his neck to keep a lid on the deaths so a multimillion-dollar amusement park can be built nearby. Featuring special effects from Ernest Farino, John Cosentino, and Larry Schelecter, The Alien Factor had a long run on TV throughout the 1980s, including on Ted Turner's Superstation WPCH-TV.

Dohler made several more low-budget films during the 1980s, including The Galaxy Invader, Nightbeast, Blood Massacre and Fiend, a serial killer film with a supernatural twist.

After an eleven-year self-imposed hiatus, Dohler returned to filmmaking with Alien Rampage, where Dohler met actor/cop Joe Ripple. Dohler never cared for directing, so he asked Ripple to direct his films, and he concentrated on cinematography and editing. Together they made five films, including Harvesters, Stakes, Vampire Sisters, Crawler and Dead Hunt.

=== Later life and death ===
Dohler died from cancer in Maryland in 2006; he was 60 years old.

Dohler's life is chronicled in a documentary by John Kinhart titled Blood, Boobs & Beast and released in 2007.

== Filmography ==
- The Alien Factor (1978)
- Fiend (1980)
- Nightbeast (1982)
- Galaxy Invader (1985)
- Blood Massacre (1991)
- Alien Factor 2: Alien Rampage (1999) (A.K.A. Alien Rampage)
- Harvesters (2001) (Remake of Blood Massacre)
- Stakes (2002)
- Vampire Sisters (2003)
- Crawler (In Post-Production)
- Dead Hunt (2006)
