= The Alien Factor =

1978 film

- Theatrical release poster
- Directed by: Don Dohler
- Written by: Don Dohler
- Produced by: Don Dohler
- Starring: Don Leifert; Tom Griffith; Richard Dyszel; Mary Mertens; Richard Geiwitz; George Stover; Eleanor Herman; Anne Frith
- Cinematography: Britt McDonough
- Edited by: Don Dohler; Dave Ellis
- Music by: Kenneth Walker
- Production company: Cinemagic Visual Effects
- Distributed by: Cinemagic Visual Effects
- Release date: May 12, 1978
- Running time: 80 minutes
- Country: United States
- Language: English
- Budget: $3,500

The Alien Factor is a 1978 science fiction horror film written, edited, produced, and directed by Don Dohler. The film centers on a small town that is besieged by three aliens that have crash-landed in the nearby forest. A mysterious stranger named "Ben Zachary" shows up claiming to be able to save the day. Can he do what he claims?

== Plot ==
A spaceship crashes in a sparsely populated area of Earth and three horrific aliens survive the accident. The grotesque extraterrestrials soon begin to terrorize the local residents, until one intrepid soul named "Ben Zachary" chooses to fight back.

== Cast ==
- Don Leifert as Ben Zachary
- Tom Griffith as Sheriff Cinder
- Richard Dyszel as Mayor Wicker
- Mary Mertens as Edie Martin
- Richard Geiwitz as Pete
- George Stover as Steven
- Eleanor Herman as Mary Jane Carter
- Anne Frith as Dr. Ruth Sherman

Larry Schlechter and John Cosentino starred as the Inferbyce and Zagatile aliens respectively.

== Production ==
The Alien Factor became the directorial debut of Don Dohler who after working as a payroll manager for a restaurant chain for 12 years moved into film-making after being laid off from his position. The initial script was written as a comedy titled Lance Sterling, Monster Killer which would've called for 15 different monsters to be created, before Dohler and his crew decided it would be more prudent to do a straight horror film with only three monsters. The creature suits for the Inferbyce and Zagtile were built and designed by Larry Schlechter and John Cosentino respectively, while the Leemoid was created through stop motion animation which Ernest D. Farino was responsible for along with the design of the creature using earlier designs by Britt McDonough and Tim Hammell. Filming was done sporadically from October 1976 through April 1977 in and around the Baltimore, Maryland area.

== Release ==
=== Home media ===
The film was released on DVD by Retromedia Entertainment on February 26, 2002. Image Entertainment released the film on November 15, 2005 as a part of its Don Dohler Collection. It was last released by Mill Creek Entertainment on July 19, 2011.

== Reception ==
In 2002, Dave Sindelar on his film review website Fantastic Movie Musings and Ramblings criticized the film's acting as "non-existent when it isn’t bad" and direction, which Sindelar equated to being "inspired by Larry Buchanan" and concluded that the film would only be of interest for bad movie fanatics. VideoHound's Golden Movie Retriever (2011) awarded the film one and a half out of four "bones", noting that the film had "decent special effects". Critical Outcast, in a 2013 review, gave the film a negative review writing, "The Alien Factor is undeniably bad, but it does have a certain energy to it, credit for a guy who went out and just did it. I would not really recommend you go out of your way for it. It is not a good movie, just admirable for the conditions under which it was made." In an undated review TV Guide gave the film two out of five stars calling it "silly", also writing, "Only the undiscriminating will be able to sit through this one".

== Sequel ==
Alien Factor 2: Alien Rampage was released in 2001. The film was not actually a sequel. Retromedia distributor Fred Olen Ray chose the sequel-sounding title to market the film on DVD in 2002. The original title for The Alien Factor 2 was Alien Rampage. Alien Rampage was filmed in 1999 and was Don Dohler's comeback movie after an 11-year hiatus from filmmaking.

Dread Central called the film "a crushing bore" and said it lacked Dohler's usual "hokey B-movie charm".
