= John Dods =

American filmmaker and make-up artist

- Born: John Bruce Dods; December 10, 1948 (age 77)

John Bruce Dods (born December 10, 1948, in Plainfield, New Jersey) is a United States filmmaker, make-up artist and specialist in prosthetic make-up effects for movies and the stage. He may be best known for designing and creating the facial appliances for the stage productions of Disney’s Beauty and the Beast.

Dods’ early work as an amateur filmmaker involved the construction of miniature models and sets for elaborate stop-motion animation projects. His creation of latex-covered animation models led him toward the crafts of sculpting, mechanics and mold-making, which in turn led toward a budding career as a mask- and monster-maker (as displayed in the independent 1980s horror films Nightbeast, Return of the Aliens: The Deadly Spawn, Spookies, and My Demon Lover).

Following his studies under Academy Award-winning make-up artist Dick Smith, Dods was employed as make-up artist, mold-maker and mechanical effects designer in mainstream feature films, including Poltergeist III, Ghostbusters II, Death Becomes Her, Longtime Companion, A Kiss Before Dying, The Santa Clause, Alien: Resurrection and The X-Files.

Dods also was effects supervisor on 18 episodes of the syndicated television series Monsters, and worked as a set construction supervisor on the Back to the Future theme park ride at Universal Studios Florida.

Dods created the prosthetic make-up for the creature, played by Shuler Hensley, in Mel Brooks musical stage adaptation of Young Frankenstein, which debuted on Broadway in November 2007.
