= Dick Dyszel =

American television personality

Richard E. Dyszel
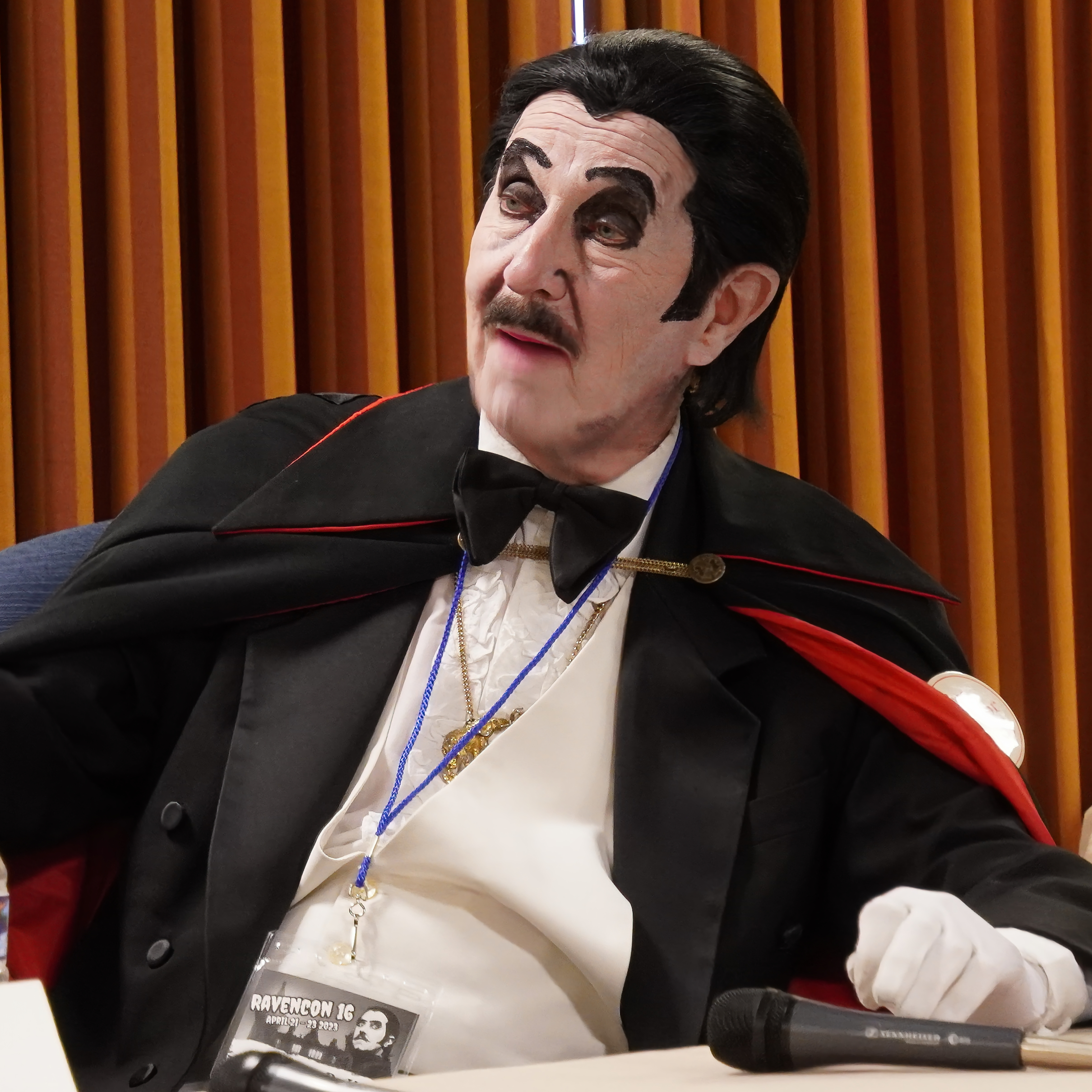
- Dyszel in character as Count Gore de Vol in 2023
- Born: March 20, 1947 (age 79); Chicago, Illinois, U.S.
- Other name: Dick Dyszel
- Occupations: Television personality, interviewer
- Known for: Count Gore De Vol
- Website: Official website

Richard E. Dyszel (/daɪˈzɛl/, dy-ZEL), known professionally as Dick Dyszel, is an American television personality, known for his television alter-egos Count Gore De Vol and Captain 20.

== Background ==
The Chicago native attended Southern Illinois University and graduated with a degree in radio-TV. He became the local Bozo the Clown at WDXR-TV in Paducah, Kentucky, before moving on to WDCA in Washington in 1972. He was a jack of all trades at WDCA, functioning as the station's announcer, as kids' show host Captain 20 as well as Washington's second Bozo, after Willard Scott had originated the local version of the character. The horror host character of Count Gore De Vol (whose name was either a play on author and native Washingtonian Gore Vidal or the name of a prominent Washington D.C. funeral home, "De Vol") originated as a character called "M.T. Graves" on the Bozo show. He stayed on as the Count until 1987 when the station ceased local production.

In 1998, Dyszel presented a weekly show on the Internet at CountGore.com, featuring Count Gore hosting streaming video of movies and shorts as well as celebrity interviews. In 2005 he returned to the DC area, built a high-definition studio and expanded the role of Count Gore De Vol to include live-hosted horror movies at the AFI Silver Theatre in Silver Spring, Maryland. This series started on February 3, 2013, with the 40th anniversary celebration of his first hosted horror movie on WDCA-TV—House of Frankenstein. In February 2023, he celebrated fifty years with a showing of The Shining at the AFI Silver.

Between 1987 and 2015 he owned and operated the mobile DJ service called Sounds Fabulous Entertainment. He specialized in providing music for commercial fashion shows as well as being DJ/MC at over 1,000 wedding receptions. He also created a virtual DJ system named George for small-venue parties. As Count Gore De Vol, he is a guest at six to ten conventions a year and is closely associated with the Spooky Movie Film Festival, an annual week-long celebration of horror feature films and shorts, which celebrated its tenth year in 2015.
