= Chicago Thanksgiving Parade =

Annual parade

The Chicago Thanksgiving Parade, "Chicago's Grand Holiday Tradition", is an annual parade produced and presented by the Chicago Festival Association (CFA). It began in 1934 and is held in downtown Chicago on State Street, every Thanksgiving morning from 8:00 am until 11:00 am CST. It is televised locally on WBBM-TV. From 2007 to 2019, the event was carried on WGN-TV and its superstation feed nationwide.

== History ==
In 1934, the United States had been in the Great Depression for six years. Many leaders in Chicago searched for ways to boost the economy as well as public spirit. Walter Gregory, President of Chicago's State Street Council, proposed a Christmas parade to Chicago Mayor Edward Kelly in the hopes that it would improve the moods of Chicago residents. The Mayor agreed to the parade, being primarily interested in its potential to improve Chicago's economy.

Chicago's first Christmas Parade was on State Street on December 7, 1934. Gregory and a costumed Santa Claus led the caravan, which was filled with toys and various merchandise from State Street businesses. As the city's government officials had hoped, the parade contributed to desirable growth in the local economy and 1934 held the city's largest holiday buying period since 1927. This was both exciting and surprising for the entire city. Not only was it the Depression, but that day held dangerously low temperatures throughout the entire state. Some areas of Illinois were as low as fourteen degrees below zero (Fahrenheit).

In 1935, the city was in even worse financial status as a result of the Depression. The city could not afford the expensive floats that were used the year before. However, the event had been so successful in the previous year that The State Street Council and the City of Chicago agreed to use an old trolley to pull the floats, as there were trolley tracks on State Street at the time.

The parade was held despite World War II.

The parade underwent a leadership change in 1968, when the Mayor's Office of Special Events took over the responsibility of producing the holiday parade when the State Street Council determined that it could no longer fund the parade. Mayor Richard J. Daley assured the children of Chicago that Santa Claus would still be coming to town as usual.

In 1969, the Chicago Tribune reported that more than 1.5 million people lined the parade route.

In 1981, over 100 Santas handed out over 10,000 balloons as hundreds of thousands watched the parade.

The parade saw its first title sponsor in 1984. The parade was renamed "The Ronald McDonald Children's Charities Parade". The route of the parade was also changed from State Street to Michigan Avenue. McDonald's was the title sponsor until 1989, and has had some sort of sponsorship with the parade to this day.

In 1990, the parade became known as "The Brach's Kid's Holiday Parade". Local confectioner Brach's Confections, Inc. assumed the title sponsorship of the parade until 1998.

In 1998, Marshall Field's took over as title sponsor of the parade. "The Field's Jingle Elf Parade" was created and lasted through the 2001 parade. The Radio City Rockettes began a three-year run of opening the parade's television broadcast with a high-kicking routine. That same year, the parade started focusing on debuting several giant character balloons. Starting with Kermit the Frog and Billy Blazes, Chicago's Thanksgiving Parade has introduced more recognizable character balloons since this time than any other parade in the country.

In 1999, Target joined Marshall Field's as the title sponsor. The parade was moved back to State Street, and for the first time, takes place on Thanksgiving Day.

In 2001, Ringling Bros. and Barnum & Bailey Circus became the parade's newest opening act – a position it held until 2016 (the circus performed its last show in May 2017). This year, the circus introduced the first elephant to appear in the parade.

The "Target Thanksgiving Parade" was formed in 2002, as Target took over title sponsorship of the parade. In this year, CFA signed a five-year national syndication deal with ABC 7 Chicago. A partnership with CFA and The League of Chicago Theatres was formed as well, resulting in several local and national touring theatre companies performing vignettes of their current productions for the parade.

In 2003, the parade was renamed the "State Street Thanksgiving Parade". The parade presented its first-ever unit from Hawaii – E la Ka Hololio Me Ke Kahiau, a traditional equestrian group from Kailua, Hawaii.

In 2004, the City of Zurich (Switzerland) Police Band made its Chicago debut as the first international unit to appear in the parade.

In 2006, the parade assumed the name "McDonald's Thanksgiving Parade," as the McDonald's Owners of Chicagoland and Northwest Indiana and the McDonald's Corporation announced a two-year title sponsorship of the parade. Close to a half-million spectators line Chicago's State Street for one of the warmest Thanksgiving mornings in memory.

In 2007, WGN-TV and CFA announced that the station would broadcast the McDonald's Thanksgiving Parade live and in high definition on WGN 9 Chicago. Available in 72 million homes at that time, Superstation WGN (now WGN America) also aired the parade live across the nation. This established the parade as one of three parades in the country to be covered live, in its entirety, on a national television broadcast.

In 2008, the parade celebrated its 75th step-off with a three-hour live broadcast. The first hour of the parade featured the best in local theatre and culture, with the rest of the parade featuring the traditional, forward motion parade.

In 2010, the parade announced local-born actress Jennifer Beals as its Grand Marshal. The parade reached a record high 3.75 million viewers across the country. Over 350,000 spectators braved the elements and attended the parade in person on State Street.

In 2011, the crowds enjoyed clear weather and a parade line-up consisting of Grand Marshal Holland Taylor, the Harlem Globetrotters, the Chicago cast of Million Dollar Quartet, the Eriam Sisters, Celeste Kellogg and more.

In 2018, Chicago-area outdoor retailer Uncle Dan's became the headline sponsor.

In 2020, saw no parade as a result of the COVID-19 pandemic; parade organizers noted they had been ordered by the city of Chicago not to hold the parade, nor any other "special events". This was the first cancellation in history, with the 87th edition being deferred to 2021.

=== Names ===
- 1934: Christmas Caravan

On State Street from Wacker Drive to Congress Parkway

- 1935–1983: State Street Christmas Parade
- 1984–1989: McDonald's Children's Charity Parade

parade route changed as well, now on Michigan Avenue From Balbo Avenue to Wacker Drive

- 1990: The Brach's Kids Holiday Parade (Brach's Confections)
- 1998: The Field's Jingle Elf Parade (sponsored by Marshall Field's)
- 1999: The Field's Jingle Elf Parade Presented by Target & Marshall Field's

parade route and date changed as well, now on Thanksgiving Day and back on State Street, moving north from Congress Parkway to Randolph Street

- 2002: Target Thanksgiving Parade (Target Corporation)
- 2003–2005: State Street Thanksgiving Parade
- 2006–2017: McDonald's Thanksgiving Parade
- 2018: Uncle Dan's Thanksgiving Day Parade
- 2019, 2021–present: Chicago Thanksgiving Parade

== Groups ==
Every year, more than 100 different groups, otherwise known as "units", walk down the parade route. These units are made up of Giant Inflatables, Specialty Units, Equestrian Units, Marching Bands, and Floats.

=== Teddy Turkey ===
Teddy Turkey is the plump mascot of the Uncle Dan's Thanksgiving Teddy also is known to make appearances throughout the city, helping to spread the holiday spirit – year round – to everyone he meets. Teddy has a Facebook page at facebook.com/teddyturkey and a Twitter account at @TeddyTurkey.

=== Balloons ===
The Chicago Thanksgiving Parade uses primarily helium balloons, which have the benefit of floating in the air. In recent years, a helium shortage has caused several parades to cut down or cease their helium use altogether. However, The producers of this parade have yet to express any plans to move to cold air balloons; only one or two cold air balloons are used every year. Chicago's Thanksgiving Parade is the city's only event that features inflatable balloons every year.

==== Parade school ====
Every year, the producers of the parade hold a parade training school to ensure sufficient preparation in several of the volunteers. For many years the Chicago Festival Association, the pa with the Museum of Science & Industry in Chicago, and hold the day's proceedings there. The main attraction and section of the school is for the "balloon handlers", a name given to the volunteers who balance the giant inflatables as they go down the parade route. All volunteers are treated to a sneak preview of the parade. 2010's parade school included performances from Miss Illinois and the 501st Midwest Garrison. Honorary Grand Marshal Ronald McDonald also gave a motivational speech and emceed the event.

==== Balloon inflation ====
The balloons for the parade begin the inflation process before sunrise to the south of the beginning of the parade route. It takes several people to fill each balloon with helium or cold air.

==== Featured balloons ====
- 2025: Teddy Turkey (cold air), Jewel-Osco's Jojo
- 2024: Teddy Turkey (cold air), Rudolph the Red-Nosed Reindeer (cold air), Jewel-Osco's Jojo
- 2023: Cookie Monster, Teddy Turkey (cold air), The Cat in the Hat, Rudolph the Red-Nosed Reindeer, Animal, Kermit the Frog, The Abominable Snowman, Peppa Pig, Care Bear, Garfield, The Grinch, The Lorax, Jewel-Osco's Jojo, The Rolling Stones logo spheres
- 2022: Scooby-Doo (cold air), Yogi Bear (cold air), Brainy Smurf (cold air), Hello Kitty (cold air), Felix the Cat (cold air), Fred Flintstone (cold air)
- 2021: No balloons due to COVID-19 restrictions
- 2020: Event entirely cancelled due to COVID-19 pandemic
- 2019: All balloons grounded due to severe winds
- 2018: Fred Flintstone (cold air), Rudolph, Tasmanian Devil
- 2017: Scooby-Doo (cold air), Yogi Bear (cold air), Fred Flintstone (cold air)
- 2016: Teddy Turkey (cold air), Kung Fu Panda (cold air), Cookie Monster (cold air)
- 2015: Teddy Turkey (cold air), Plex, Care Bear, Arthur, Hello Kitty, Tweety Bird
- 2014: Scooby-Doo (cold air), Strawberry Shortcake, Fred Flintstone, Arthur, Curious George, Madeline, Tweety Bird
- 2013: Teddy Turkey (cold air), Garfield with Pooky, Tazmanian Devil, Curious George, Foofa, Mr. Potato Head, Arthur, Madeline, Tweety Bird, Pac-Man, Sid the Science Kid, The Nutcracker
- 2012: Arthur, Cornucopia, Curious George, Gingerbread Man, Mighty Mouse, Mr. Potato Head, Odie, Paddington Bear, Peter the Penguin, Tom and Jerry, Pilgrim Garfield, Woody Woodpecker
- 2011: Teddy Turkey (cold air), Pilgrim Garfield, Curious George, Rocky J. Squirrel, Papa Smurf, Big Bird, Arthur, Bullwinkle J. Moose, Odie, Yogi Bear, Fred Flintstone, Elmo
- 2010: Teddy Turkey (cold air), Bob the Builder, Bullwinkle J. Moose, Curious George, Madeline, Kenneth the Blue Elf, Fred Flintstone, Pilgrim Garfield, Maisy Mouse, Scooby-Doo, Underdog, Yogi Bear
- 2009: Pilgrim Garfield, Strawberry Shortcake, Underdog, Paddington Bear, Raggs, Bob the Builder, Hello Kitty, Cookie Monster, Bullwinkle J. Moose, Curious George, Maisy Mouse, Rocky the Flying Squirrel
- 2008: Teddy Turkey (cold air), Elmo, Bob the Builder, Animal, Pilgrim Garfield, Cow Jumped Over the Moon, Arthur, Curious George, Super Grover, Cookie Monster, Popeye, Paddington Bear
- 2007: Teddy Turkey (cold air), Cookie Monster, Elmo, Strawberry Shortcake, Bear in the Big Blue House, The Nutcracker, Pink Panther, Kermit the Frog, Big Bird, Popeye, Animal, Rudolph
- 2006: Teddy Turkey (cold air), Humpty Dumpty, Hickory Dickory Dock, Gingerbread Man, Bear in the Big Blue House, The Nutcracker, Frosty the Snowman, Kermit the Frog, Bert and Ernie, T-Rex, Bob and Larry, Rudolph

=== Specialty units ===
Specialty units is a general category and refers to groups with unique skills or routines in the parade, such as international dance groups and sports teams. If they can easily fall into another category first, they will no longer be defined as a "specialty unit". For example, if the grouped danced but also featured horses, they would be defined as an Equestrian Unit (see below) instead.

To viewers, "specialty units" are often considered some of the most anticipated and greatly enjoyed additions to the yearly parade. As such, the search for potential "specialty units" generally occurs on a year-round basis. Unlike most other parades, the producers of this Chicago parade search for new members in more ways than the standard browsing of electronic and media sources. Representatives from the Chicago Festival Association travel around the country on a regular basis to recruit new acts.

==== Featured specialty units ====
- 2022: Chicago Bulls, Chicago White Sox, Toronto Dance Company, Shanghai Ballet Company, Chicago Bears, Chicago Blackhawks, June Lawrence School of Dance, Hong Kong Dance Company

=== Equestrian units ===
Equestrian Units are groups, or "units", which feature horses as part of their performance. This is a unique addition to various parades, and the Chicago Festival Association pays special attention to potential Equestrian Units to add to the parade every year. In 2007 alone, the producers added three new Equestrian Units to the parade. The new units included the "Children's Fantasy Theatre Orchard", "Illinois Junior Miss Emily Boker", and "Southern Ohio Ladies Aside". Since the Chicago Festival Association was given rights to produce the parade, they have made great efforts to bring in Equestrian Units from some of the most popular theater productions in Chicago. For example, in 2007, the Chicago Festival Association welcomed back the Goodman Theatre and the horses and actors from their world-renowned production, A Christmas Carol.

==== Featured equestrian units ====
- 2022: Medieval Times, Chicago Police Department, Budweiser Clydesdales, Walt Disney World

=== Marching bands ===
Marching Bands come to the Thanksgiving Parade from all over the country every year, and are mainly recruited by Worldstrides Heritage Performance Programs, formerly known as Bowl Games of America. Approximately twenty-four of many of the nation's top high school marching bands appear in the parade from year to year, including the 150 member Bartlett High School Marching Band, which made its first appearance in 2004. Altogether, approximately 3000 high school band members play in the parade.

==== Featured marching bands ====
- 2022: Cedarville HS Marching Band, Lumen Christi Marching Band, Northwestern University Wildcat Marching Band, Indiana University Marching Hundred, McLean High School Band, Pride of Dayton Marching Band

=== Floats ===
Floats are decorated platforms, which are either built on a vehicle or towed behind one. These creations give groups and organizations a unique opportunity to present themselves to the viewers of the parade. In the 2007 Thanksgiving Parade, nineteen organizations and groups created floats to present to those watching.

==== Featured floats ====
- 2022: Turning Red, Lightyear, Soul, Raya and the Last Dragon, Hero Elementary, Alma's Way

== The parade today ==
In 2000, the Chicago Festival Association was given the rights to produce the Field's Jingle Elf Parade by the City of Chicago. Before that time, the parade had been produced for several years by the Chicago Christmas Parade Association. In 1999 the Chicago Christmas Parade Association's last year brought a significant change, as they reverted the parade route back to State Street. The parade had previously been on Michigan Avenue (see above).

Many followers took a great deal of pride that the parade had returned to State Street. However, because of the positive effect that the Michigan Avenue parade route had on the city's economy—bringing many potential holiday shoppers into the many world-famous stores on Michigan Avenue—many individuals voiced great criticism. After all, the Greater State Street Council had made it very clear that no State Street businesses would be open for business on Thanksgiving Day. The Chicago Festival Association responded that although the parade was originally created to stimulate economic growth, the parade now primarily exists as a community celebration. In any case, as the parade grew in only a few years, Chicago's economy is continuing to see the parade's growing benefits. Hence, criticism about its location change has long-since passed.

Since that time, the organization has made many more significant changes, and today the parade is capturing much more attention. In 2002, the Chicago Festival Association changed the parade format from a Christmas or often broadly-labeled holiday parade to the Thanksgiving parade that it is today. In only a few years, the number of spectators on the streets have increased by hundreds of thousands. The parade is also given a live national broadcast. This is generally considered expedient growth, as the parade was available in no more than a handful of cities only two years ago.

From 2006 to 2017, McDonald's partnered with the Chicago Festival Association as the parade's title sponsor. Although it isn't publicly known how long McDonald's plans to be the parade's title sponsor, they have frequently and publicly expressed interest in sponsoring the event.

In 2007, the Chicago Festival Association recruited the pop rock group Plain White T's to perform in the parade. In the last couple of years, the band had reached success and their single "Hey There Delilah" had been number one on the Billboard chart for two weeks. Despite the unseasonably cold temperatures, the Plain White T's agreed to do a free performance in the parade, which was no doubt greatly because of the parade's quickly growing ratings along with the event's first national broadcast.

In 2008, the parade was on its 75th year. That year's parade was broadcast for three hours, from 8:00 am to 11:00 am CST on WGN-TV9 and WGN-DT9.1 in Chicago, and WGN America nationwide. This makes the Chicago Thanksgiving Parade one of only two parades (the Macy's Thanksgiving Day Parade being the other) to be broadcast in its entirety to a nationwide audience. 2008 also featured Grand Marshal Jennie Finch, WWE wrestler (and Chicago native) CM Punk and the Harlem Globetrotters.

In 2010, Grand Marshal Jennifer Beals, Honorary Grand Marshal Ronald McDonald, and Santa Claus were featured in a three-hour entertainment extravaganza. The parade featured the top marching bands in the country, including powerhouses Marist High School, Proviso East High School, Houston County High School and more. The parade featured the debut of several giant balloons as well, including Yogi Bear, Fred Flintstone, and Scooby-Doo.

In 2011, Grand Marshal Holland Taylor, Chicago's Black Ensemble Theater, the EriAm Sisters and Celeste Kellogg were featured in the parade. The parade concluded with its first closing number, a tribute to Ferris Bueller. In this ending, Santa Claus and WGN's Ana Belaval led the crowd in dancing to "Twist and Shout".

== Television ==
In 2007, the Chicago Festival Association signed a contract with Chicago's WGN-TV. Although the parade was in its 74th consecutive year, it was the first to feature a live national broadcast. With WGN-TV partnership, the 2007 McDonald's Thanksgiving Parade became available in approximately 72 million homes across the United States through WGN's superstation simulcast, Superstation WGN (now known as WGN America). WGN airs the parade in conjunction with its annual retrospective special, Bozo, Gar and Ray: WGN TV Classics.

In 2008, WGN and WGN America aired the parade for three hours. This was a first for Chicago's Thanksgiving Parade. Leading off with Ringling Bros. and Barnum & Bailey, the first hour showcased some of the area's top theatre and ethnic performance groups. The following two hours showcased the parade, including the official McDonald's Thanksgiving Parade marching band from Proviso East High School.

The team of Paul Konrad and Robin Baumgarten were the hosts of the parade 2007 to 2013. Ana Beleval has been the on-street reporter from 2010 to 2013.

Mark Suppelsa and Micah Materre hosted the 2014 parade with on-street reporter Amy Rutledge.

With WGN-TV severing all remaining ties with WGN America (other than ownership) at the end of 2014, and the latter eliminating all Chicago-related programming from its lineup, the McDonald's Thanksgiving Parade (which remains on WGN America's schedule) was the last programming that overlapped between the two stations. WGN America quietly dropped the parade simulcast prior to 2019, though WGN carried it locally and online that year.

In 2021, the parade severed ties with WGN and announced it would air that year's parade on VPOD TV, an independent micro-network carried across northern Illinois on the digital subchannels of WAOE, WCHU-LD and WILC-CD (all virtual channel 59). As VPOD TV is not carried on any cable or satellite provider (the channels' owners have opted to use their must carry privileges on an all-infomercial subchannel), the event was simulcast online, and an audio relay was also carried on WCKG.

The VPOD/WCKG broadcast agreement ended after one year, and in 2022, the parade secured an agreement with WCIU-TV (which had replaced WGN as Chicago's CW affiliate) to carry the last two hours of the event live, with the first hour devoted to staged live performances. Jesse Hutch and Jen Lilley will serve as hosts, through a promotional partnership with Great American Family. The parade is also being offered in independent syndication to stations outside Chicago.

Pluto TV acquired the rights to the parade telecast for 2023. Pluto renewed its rights for 2024 and 2025. WCIU carried the broadcast in Chicagoland, with an encore presentation on Chicago Access Network Television.

In 2025, WBBM-TV (which, like Pluto TV, is owned by Paramount Skydance) will carry the broadcast in Chicagoland, with Pluto TV continuing to stream the broadcast nationally, and encore presentations on Chicago Access Network Television.

== Movie coverage ==
In the movie The Weather Man, Nicolas Cage plays the role of David Spritz, a middle-age Chicago weather man who finds that he is losing confidence in various aspects of his life. He is also greatly troubled by the low level of respect he is given by residents of Chicago. However, the end of the movie brings a different story, and Spritz (Cage) finally gains a new sense of confidence and stability. The culmination of this positive change is when he is shown on top of a float in the State Street Thanksgiving Parade, waving at all of the excited spectators. This acts as a symbol of his confidence and success. By being on this float, Spritz is shown as a prized public icon.

To achieve this scene, Paramount Pictures was granted permission by the Chicago Festival Association to film the float as it went down State Street in the 2004 parade. Using visual effects, Cage was then digitally added to the picture.
