= Bob Jordan (newscaster) =

American newscaster

- Born: August 31, 1943 (age 83); Atlanta, Georgia, U.S.
- Education: Loyola University Chicago; Northeastern Illinois University; Roosevelt University
- Occupations: Television News Journalist; Author; Weekend news anchor at WGN-TV
- Years active: 1970-2016

Robert Howard (Bob) Jordan, Jr. (born August 31, 1943 in Atlanta, Georgia) is a retired American television news journalist, author and former weekend anchor of the WGN News at Nine, which broadcasts on WGN-TV in Chicago, Illinois, and co-anchored the weekend newscast alongside Jackie Bange from 1995 until his retirement in 2016. He also produced, wrote, and served as a general assignment reporter for the weekday newscasts.

== Education ==
Jordan holds a Ph.D in Philosophy of Education with a minor in Ethics from Loyola University Chicago in May 1999. He graduated with a Master of Arts degree from Northeastern Illinois University in May 1994 with a degree in Speech, and his bachelor's degree in General Studies from Roosevelt University in Chicago.

== Military career ==
Jordan served as a Surgical Assistant with the United States Army.

== Civilian career ==
Jordan's television career began in 1970 at WSM-TV in Nashville, Tennessee, where he served as a booth announcer. At WSM-TV Jordan was also served as a news anchor for an early morning variety show and responsible for on-camera news breaks.

=== WGN-TV, Other Assignments ===
Jordan joined WGN-TV in 1973 as a general assignment reporter; he also served as an anchor for the One O'Clock News. Jordan left WGN-TV in 1978 and joined the CBS News Midwest Bureau in Chicago. In his two years at CBS, Jordan spent time covering stories in the Midwest for the CBS Evening News with Walter Cronkite. He later returned to WGN-TV, by then a national cable TV superstation, in 1980.

On August 14, 2016, Jordan announced he would retire from WGN-TV as weekend co-anchor effective Sep 25, but will remain as a fill-in news anchor for the remainder of his contract.

=== Writing Credits ===
In November 2017, Jordan's first book was published: Murder in The News: An Inside Look at How Television Covers Crime."

Robert has many writing credits to his name including two screenplays, Anthony's Key and Multi-Man. He has also written articles for the Chicago Tribune.

=== Other interests ===
Robert serves on the Board of Directors of several local organizations including the John G. Shedd Aquarium, the Safer Foundation and The Night Ministry. He is also part of the advisory board for The Salvation Army.

== Personal life ==
Jordan and his wife, Sharon, live in Lincolnwood, Illinois. They have one daughter, Karen, also a reporter/anchor in Chicago. She is employed with WLS-TV, the ABC-TV station in Chicago; her husband, Christian Farr, is a reporter with WMAQ-TV, the NBC-TV station in Chicago.
