= WGN-TV =

Television station in Chicago

- Chicago, Illinois; United States
- Channels: Digital: 19 (UHF); Virtual: 9
- Branding: WGN 9; WGN News

Programming
- Affiliations: 9.1: The CW; for others, see § Subchannels

Ownership
- Owner: Nexstar Media Group; (Tribune Media Company)
- Sister stations: WGN (AM); NewsNation

History
- First air date: April 5, 1948
- Former call signs: WGNA (CP, 1946–1948)
- Former channel number: Analog: 9 (VHF, 1948–2009)
- Former affiliations: Independent (1948, 1956–1995, 2016–2024); CBS (1948–1953); DuMont (1948–1956); NTA (1957–1961); United (1967); The WB (1995–2006); The CW (2006–2016)
- Call sign meaning: Founded by the Chicago Tribune, the "World's Greatest Newspaper"

Technical information
- Licensing authority: FCC
- Facility ID: 72115
- ERP: 645 kW
- HAAT: 454 m (1,490 ft)
- Transmitter coordinates: 41°52′44″N 87°38′10.2″W
- Translator(s): K32MF-D Red Lake, MN

Links
- Public license information: Public file; LMS
- Website: wgntv.com

WGN-TV (channel 9) is a television station in Chicago, Illinois, United States, that serves as the local outlet for The CW. It is owned and operated by the network's parent company, Nexstar Media Group, sharing common ownership with its radio counterpart, WGN (720 AM), a news-talk and sports station. WGN-TV's studios are located on West Bradley Place in Chicago's North Center; it is Chicago's only major commercial television station whose main studio is based outside the Chicago Loop. Its transmitter is located atop Willis Tower in the Loop.

The station began broadcasting in 1948, when it was owned by the Chicago Tribune newspaper. WGN-TV became one of the earliest superstations; on November 9, 1978, it became the second U.S. television station to be made available via satellite transmission to cable and direct-broadcast satellite subscribers nationwide. The superstation, which was later renamed WGN America, was converted into a conventional, basic cable network in December 2014, enabling it to be added to local cable providers. It was soft re-launched as NewsNation in September 2020. WGN-TV was a charter affiliate of The WB and its successor network The CW; it became an independent station in 2016 and returned to the network in 2024.

WGN-TV, WGN radio, and the now-defunct regional cable news channel Chicagoland Television (CLTV) were the three flagship properties of Tribune Broadcasting, until the company's purchase by Nexstar in 2019.

== History ==
=== Early years (1948–1956) ===
The front page of Part Five of the Chicago Sunday Tribune of April 4, 1948, announcing the launch of WGN-TV the next day.

On September 13, 1946, the Chicago Tribune Company applied to the Federal Communications Commission (FCC) to build a television station on VHF channel 9. (Note: WGN representatives had to amend the application to use channel 9 as its proposed channel assignment after realizing that the initial application listed VHF channel 4, which had already been assigned to Balaban and Katz Broadcasting for the fledgling WBKB-TV, as the allocation for the proposed station.) The FCC awarded the construction permit on November 8, after which the group requested to assign WGNA as the station's call sign. By January 1948, the company decided to call the station WGN-TV after WGN, which the Tribune had owned since 1924. The three-letter base call sign served as an initialism for "World's Greatest Newspaper", the Tribune's tagline at the time.

WGN-TV began test broadcasts on February 1, 1948, then informally opened on March 6 to broadcast the 1948 Golden Gloves boxing finals from the Chicago Stadium. Regular programming commenced at 7:45 p.m. on April 5, 1948, with a two-hour-long special, WGN-TV Salute to Chicago. The station was broadcast from WGN Radio's studios at Tribune Tower's Centennial Building annex in the Magnificent Mile district; the inaugural broadcast included dedicatory speeches from Chicago Tribune editor and publisher Robert R. McCormick, (Note: McCormick was too ill to attend the event himself; consequently, his speech was read at the ceremony by a business associate.) Chicago Mayor Martin Kennelly, U.S. Senator Charles W. Brooks, and Governor of Illinois Dwight Green. Performances were led by acts including musician Dick "Two Ton" Baker, comedian George Gobel, bandleader Robert Trendler, and the WGN Orchestra (WGN's in-house band). Afterward, a film previewed WGN-TV's initial program offerings. The next day, the station aired its first spot advertisement, a 15-second Bulova time signal just before 8 p.m.

WGN-TV was the second commercial television station in Illinois; WBKB (channel 4) had launched two years earlier. Initially, WGN-TV operated from the Chicago Daily News Building and its 586-foot (179 m) transmission tower was atop the building. The station originally broadcast from 2 to 6 p.m., and from 7:30 to 10 p.m., seven days a week. It was initially an independent station, and began carrying programming from DuMont and CBS a few months after its launch.

On January 11, 1949, WGN-TV began transmitting network programming over a live coaxial feed from New York City, allowing it to carry a regular schedule of CBS and DuMont programs that could be transmitted as they aired in the Eastern Time Zone. WBKB-TV assumed primary rights to CBS programming on September 5, 1949; as a result, WGN dropped many CBS shows from its schedule. It continued to broadcast programs WBKB-TV declined to broadcast, eventually being reduced to CBS's weekday morning soap opera block by 1952. During its tenure with DuMont, WGN-TV became one of its major production centers. During the late 1940s and the early 1950s, several DuMont programs, including The Al Morgan Show, Chicago Symphony, Chicagoland Mystery Players, Music From Chicago, The Music Show, They Stand Accused, This Is Music, Windy City Jamboree, and Down You Go, were produced at WGN-TV's facilities.

A TV schedule showing programming from 4 to 10 p.m., Thursday, September 16, 1954, for four TV stations in Chicago. WGN is the column on the left.

On January 25, 1950, the WGN stations relocated to the Centennial Building, which was renovated to accommodate production and office facilities for WGN-TV. The facility included one master studio, two auxiliary studios, and a sub-basement studio situated 75 feet (23 m) below street level; this latter studio would allow WGN-TV-AM and WGNB to continue broadcasts in the event of a nuclear attack on Chicago. In 1953, as part of United Paramount Theatres (UPT)'s merger with the American Broadcasting Company (ABC), CBS assumed ownership of WBKB-TV through a $6.75-million acquisition designed to allow UPT (Note: UPT absorbed WBKB parent Balaban and Katz in March 1949, after Paramount Pictures divested its chain of movie theaters by order of the U.S. Supreme Court.) to acquire ABC-owned WENR-TV in compliance with FCC regulations that forbade common ownership of two television stations within the same market. CBS moved the remainder of its programming to the renamed WBBM-TV, leaving WGN-TV exclusively affiliated with the faltering DuMont. By 1954, WGN-TV expanded its broadcast schedule to 18 hours per day, running from 6 a.m. to midnight.

After McCormick died on April 1, 1955, ownership of WGN-TV-AM, the Chicago Tribune, and the News Syndicate Company properties were transferred to the McCormick-Patterson Trust, which was assigned to the Robert R. McCormick Tribune Foundation in the names of the non-familial heirs of McCormick and familial heirs of Patterson. (Note: McCormick's two marriages produced no children. The trust was dissolved in January 1975, with a majority of the trust's former beneficiaries, including descendants of the McCormick and Patterson families, owning stock in the restructured Tribune Company entity—which assumed oversight of all properties previously overseen by the trust—afterward.)

=== Independence (1956–1995) ===
WGN-TV was no longer affiliated with DuMont when the network ceased operations on August 6, 1956. Because the three remaining commercial broadcast networks (ABC, NBC, and CBS) each owned television stations in Chicago, WGN-TV became an independent station by default. Under executive vice-president and general manager Ward L. Quaal, (Note: Quaal's stewardship of the station and programming earned him the National Academy of Television Arts and Sciences [NATAS]'s Governors' Award in 1966 and 1987.) the station adopted a general-entertainment format that became typical of other major-market independents, carrying a mix of sitcoms and drama series, feature films, cartoons, and religious programs, as well as locally produced news, public affairs, music, and children's programs. WGN-TV became more reliant on sports programming, led by its broadcasts of Chicago Cubs baseball games, and other regional collegiate and professional teams. This helped WGN-TV establish itself as an alternative to the market's three network-owned stations. After initial struggles to gain enough viewership to attract national advertisers, WGN began turning a profit by October 1957. On January 15, 1956, the station moved its transmitter facilities to a 73-foot-tall (22 m) antenna on the roof of the Prudential Building and increased its effective radiated power (ERP) from 120 kilowatts (kW) to the maximum of 316 kW.

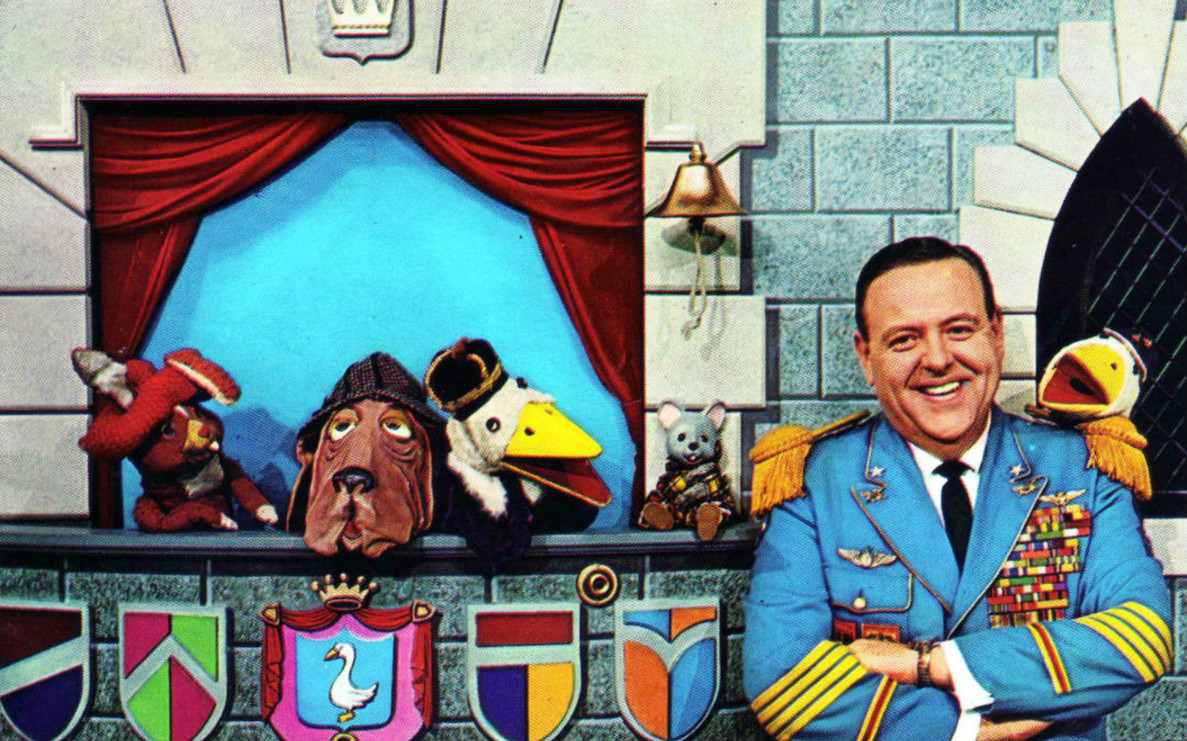
Garfield Goose and Friends was one of the earliest television programs WGN-TV broadcast in color.

In March 1957, WGN began carrying programming from the NTA Film Network and served as the network's primary Chicago affiliate, showing the majority of NTA's program offerings. This relationship lasted until National Telefilm Associates discontinued the service in November 1961. On November 8, 1957, after conducting internal tests since late 1956, WGN-TV began broadcasting select programs in color, consisting mostly of syndicated programs. In January 1958, WGN-TV became the second Chicago television station to begin transmitting local programming in color. WGN-TV was also the first television station in the world to use color-capable videotape recording and playback equipment. The first live program on the station to be broadcast in color was Ding Dong School, a music-focused children's program. In 1958, WGN-TV earned a Peabody Award—the only local television station to earn the accolade—for its children's program The Blue Fairy.

On June 27, 1961, the operations of WGN-TV and WGN radio were relocated to the WGN Mid-America Broadcast Center (now known as WGN Studios), a two-story, 95,000-square-foot (8,826 m^{2}) complex in Chicago's North Center community. The Broadcast Center, which began hosting some local productions on January 16 of that year, was developed for color broadcasting, allowing the station to broadcast live studio shows, and Chicago Cubs and White Sox baseball games, in color. It was also designed to provide a safe location to conduct broadcasts in the event of an attack on downtown Chicago. It houses three main production soundstages and two additional soundstages that were originally used as sound-recording studios for WGN Radio. (Note: WGN moved to the Pioneer Court extension on North Michigan Avenue in 1986, before eventually resuming operations at the Tribune Tower in October 2012.) The Tribune Company repurposed the former Centennial Building facility for the newspaper Chicago American, which it used until the newspaper ceased publication in 1974. An adjacent 20,000-square-foot (1,858 m^{2}), single-story building that housed non-production-related operations for the WGN stations was annexed to the facility, expanding the complex to 14.4 acres [6 ha], in 1966. (Note: Tribune sold the complex to a joint venture between local real estate firms R2 Companies and Polsky Holdings for $22.25 million on January 31, 2017, in a deal that allowed WGN-TV to lease the property for a minimum of ten years.)

The Tribune Company gradually expanded its broadcasting unit, of which WGN-TV-AM served as its flagship station. In 1964, the company started Mid-America Video Tape Productions, which later became WGN Continental Productions. The group became known as the Tribune Broadcasting Company in January 1981, but retained the moniker WGN Continental as its de facto business name until 1984, and as the licensee for WGN-TV and WGN Radio thereafter.

In May 1969, the station relocated its transmitter facilities to the 1,360-foot (415 m)-tall west antenna tower of the John Hancock Center. The original Prudential Building transmitter remained in use as an auxiliary facility until the transmitter dish was disassembled in 1984. WGN-TV was a charter member of the Operation Prime Time syndication service, a consortium founded in 1976 by Al Masini and a committee of executives with 18 independent stations. This partnership allowed WGN-TV to broadcast miniseries and first-run syndicated programs that were featured on partner stations; these shows included Solid Gold, Star Search, and Lifestyles of the Rich and Famous.

Movies became a more significant part of WGN's schedule during the late 1970s and early 1980s. During this period, depending on whether sports events or specials were scheduled, WGN-TV usually aired four daily features—one in the morning, and two to three films per night Monday through Friday, and between three-and-six films per day on Saturdays and Sundays. Among its regular film showcases were WGN [Television] Presents, (Note: WGN [Television] Presents aired during the late-access slot weeknights from 1948 to 1995, on Saturdays until 1979, and on Sundays until 1997.) and Action Theater, a showcase of action and adventure films. (Note: Action Theater ran on midday Sundays from 1952 to 1956 and, later, in Saturday late access from 1979 to 2001.) In February 1977, the station also began carrying a nightly prime time feature at 8 p.m., replacing syndicated dramas in the timeslot. The prime time films were moved to 7 p.m. in March 1980. By January 1980, when WGN became the market's second television station to offer a 24-hour schedule, the station began to air black-and-white, theatrical, and made-for-TV movies at 1 a.m., (Note: Later 3 a.m. by September 1983.) along with some syndicated programs.

=== WGN goes national (1978–1995) ===
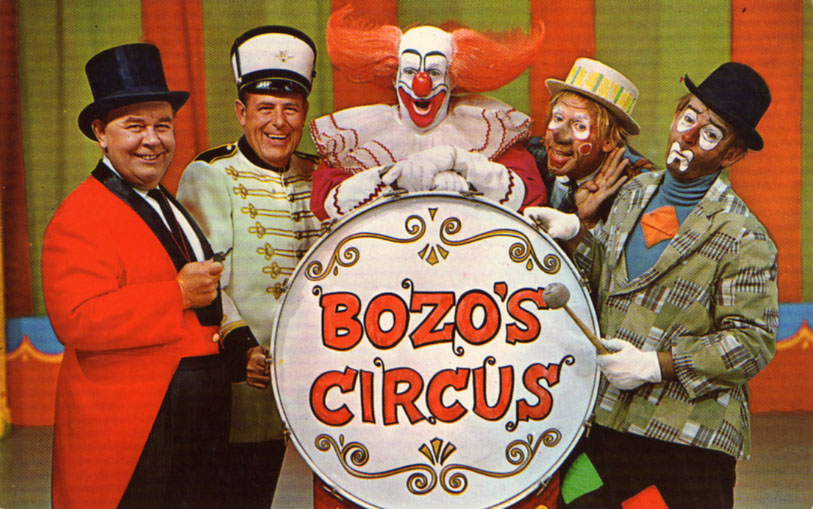
WGN's broadcasts of The Bozo Show and games involving the Chicago Cubs and the Chicago Bulls became very well-known after the station expanded its national footprint via cable.

In the mid-1970s, WGN-TV was first made available beyond the Chicago area when it was transmitted via microwave relay to cable television providers in the central Midwestern United States that lacked access to an independent, entertainment-based station. By late 1978, WGN-TV was being broadcast to 574 cable systems covering most of western, central, and southern Illinois, and large areas of Indiana, Wisconsin, Minnesota, Iowa, Missouri, and Michigan, reaching an estimated 8.6 million subscribers. On November 9, 1978, Tulsa, Oklahoma–based satellite carrier United Video Inc. uplinked the WGN-TV signal to a Satcom-3 transponder for distribution to cable and C-band satellite subscribers throughout the U.S. (Note: United Video uplinked the station's signal without WGN Continental Broadcasting's consent, using a legal exemption in the 1976 Copyright Act's compulsory license statute allowing "passive" carriers to retransmit broadcast signals without first seeking the licensee's express permission.) This resulted in WGN-TV joining the ranks of Atlanta independent station WTCG (later WTBS and now WPCH-TV) to become America's second national "superstation", independent stations distributed via satellite to cable providers within their respective regions or nationwide.

Within a week of attaining national status, WGN-TV was being carried on approximately 200 cable systems across the U.S., reaching an estimated one million subscribers. The station's cable reach grew over the next several years: outside the Midwest, the station was most-commonly distributed in the Central U.S., where its telecasts of Chicago Cubs baseball, Chicago Bulls basketball, and The Bozo Show became highly popular, and gradually expanded to most of the U.S. Tribune and station management treated WGN-TV as a "passive" superstation, asserting a neutral position over United Video relaying its signal to a national audience and leaving United to handle national promotion of the WGN signal; this allowed the station to continue paying for syndicated programming and advertising at local rates, rather than those comparable to other national networks. (Note: Until Tribune began relaying the Chicago feed to the firm directly in 1985, the company was also not compensated directly by United Video for their retransmission or promotion of WGN's signal; Tribune, however, received royalties from cable systems for programs to which it held the copyright.) As such, WGN-TV became the first Tribune-owned independent station to be distributed to a national pay-television audience. (Note: United Video uplinked WPIX in May 1984. Netlink began distributing KWGN-TV in October 1987. and Eastern Microwave Inc. began distributing KTLA in February 1988 and the first superstation to be distributed by United Video (with WGN and WPIX being joined by Gaylord Broadcasting–owned KTVT [now a CBS owned-and-operated station] in Dallas–Fort Worth in July 1984 and, after it assumed retransmission rights from Eastern Microwave, KTLA in April 1988.) For about eleven years afterward, the WGN-TV satellite signal carried the same programming as within Chicago.

Channel 32 began strengthening its syndication slate in late 1979, when it acquired the local rights to off-network series such as M*A*S*H, Happy Days and All in the Family, which helped it edge ahead of WGN-TV in the ratings by the end of that year. Tribune appointed Robert King to replace Sheldon Cooper, who was promoted to president and CEO of the new Tribune Entertainment syndication unit, as the station's general manager in 1982. WGN-TV then acquired the right to strong, first-run, and off-network syndicated programs, such as Laverne & Shirley, Good Times, Little House on the Prairie, and WKRP in Cincinnati. WGN's ratings improved throughout the 1980s under King and his successor, Dennis FitzSimons, overtaking WFLD to again become the market's top-rated independent by the end of the decade.

WGN-TV gained two additional UHF independent competitors over eight months in the early 1980s. On September 18, 1981, Focus Broadcasting signed on Joliet, Illinois–based WFBN (channel 66, now WGBO-DT), initially showing local public-access programs during the day and the Spectrum subscription service at night. On April 4, 1982, a shared operation over UHF channel 60 involving Metrowest Corporation-owned English-language outlet WPWR-TV, which primarily carried the sports-centered pay service Sportsvision, and HATCO-60-owned Spanish-language outlet WBBS-TV (now UniMás owned-and-operated station WXFT-DT) was launched. (Note: WBBS took over channel 60 full-time after WPWR moved to channel 50 in January 1987, as a byproduct of Metrowest's 1986 buyout of HATCO-60's share of the license and subsequent sale of the allocation to the Home Shopping Network.)) WGN and WFLD remained the market's strongest independent stations as they both had more robust programming inventories than their competitors.

Former logo, used from August 1983 to May 3, 1993.

In August 1983, WGN-TV unveiled the "Chicago's Very Own" campaign, one of the most-successful station-image campaigns in the U.S. (Note: The slogan, to which WGN holds the trademark rights and continues to be used by the station, is a variant of the "Chicago's Own" tagline that had been used in on-air identifications periodically since the 1960s.) Peter Marino, WGN-TV's director of promotions, and Mike Waterkotte, the creative director of Chicago advertising agency Eisaman, Johns & Law, developed the campaign; promotions focused on the city's people and cultural heritage, and WGN-TV's local programming, and were accompanied by an image theme performed by the R&B singer and Chicago native Lou Rawls. The seven-note musical signature of the image theme was also incorporated into two music packages that were used for the station's newscasts and identifications between 1984 and 1993, while the slogan has served as the title for two other news themes commissioned exclusively for WGN-TV—a John Hegner–composed package used from 1993 to 1997 and a 615 Music–composed package that has been used since November 1, 2007—as well as for a weekly profile series that aired from 1988 until 1990 and evolved into a weekly 9 p.m. news segment. The "[city/region]'s Very Own" slogan was also adapted by some of its Tribune-owned sister stations (such as WPIX, KTLA, and WTTV in Indianapolis). On November 10, 1984, WGN-TV became an affiliate of the MGM/UA Premiere Network ad hoc syndicated film service.

On November 22, 1987, during that evening's edition of The Nine O'Clock News, the WGN-TV signal was briefly overridden by video of an unidentified person wearing a Max Headroom mask and sunglasses in front of a sheet of corrugated metal, imitating the moving electronic background effect used in the character's TV and movie appearances. Oscillating audio interference obscured the audio portion throughout the 13-second video excerpt; WGN engineers successfully restored the signal by changing the frequency of its Hancock Center studio transmitter link to override the pirated feed. (Note: The extended video was seen later that night during a roughly 90-second-long hijack of a Doctor Who episode on PBS member station WTTW (channel 11). It featured several references to WGN-TV, including the masked person mocking fill-in sports anchor and WGN Radio sports commentator Chuck Swirsky as a "frickin' nerd" and a "frickin' liberal", and referring to his pretend defecation as a "masterpiece for all the greatest world newspaper nerds", paraphrasing the WGN call sign.) Bemused, sports anchor Dan Roan—who was presenting highlights of that afternoon's home game between the Chicago Bears and the Detroit Lions when the initial hijack took place at 9:14 p.m.—commented: "Well, if you're wondering what happened, so am I", and that the master control computer "took off and went wild" before continuing coverage without further incident. A similar intrusion occurred later that evening on WTTW. The perpetrators of the WGN and WTTW intrusions have never been caught or identified.

On May 18, 1988, the FCC reinstituted the Syndication Exclusivity Rights Rule ("SyndEx") it had repealed in July 1980; this rule allows television stations to claim local exclusivity over syndicated programs and requires cable systems to either black out or secure an agreement with the claimant station or a syndication distributor to continue carrying a claimed program through an out-of-market station. The new rules became effective on January 1, 1990; to indemnify cable systems from potential blackouts, United Video began offering a separate WGN national feed consisting of local and some syndicated programs, and sporting events—except those subjected to league restrictions pertaining to the number of games that could be shown on out-of-market stations annually—that aired on the WGN Chicago signal, and substitute programs that were not subjected to exclusivity claims. (Note: The feed was originally structured similarly to the concurrently launched WWOR EMI Service feed of Secaucus, New Jersey–based WWOR-TV, albeit with a larger amount of shared programming. However, the amount of common programming between the WGN local and national feeds significantly decreased during the 2000s and early 2010s as local exclusivity claims reduced the number of WGN-TV programs Tribune could clear nationally in later years.) Of the four United Video-distributed superstations, WGN was the only one to increase its national coverage after the SyndEx rules were implemented, adding 2.2 million subscribers by July 1990; some systems replaced WPIX and WWOR with the WGN superstation feed during the early 1990s.

The station has been involved in various community projects, including the WGN-TV Children's Charities, a charitable foundation established in 1990 through the Robert R. McCormick Tribune Foundation, benefiting local organizations that help local children dealing with poverty and medical issues. On January 1, 1993, Tribune launched Chicagoland Television (CLTV), a local cable news channel that featured rolling news, weather, sports content, public affairs, sports-talk, and entertainment news programs; the channel formerly acted as an overflow feed for WGN's sports telecasts. Originally using in-house staff and resources from WGN-TV and the Chicago Tribune, CLTV consolidated its operations with WGN-TV on August 28, 2009, at which time the channel's operations were relocated from its original studio facility in Oak Brook to WGN-TV's Bradley Place studios, and editorial control of CLTV was turned over to Channel 9's news department. CLTV's format soon became less-reliant on live newscasts, shifting focus to repurposed newscasts and local programming from WGN-TV. Following its acquisition of Tribune Media, Nexstar shut down Chicagoland Television on December 31, 2019, after 27 years of operation.

=== WB affiliation (1995–2006) ===
WGN-TV's first logo as a WB affiliate, used from 1995 to 2002.

On November 2, 1993, Time Warner and Tribune, which acquired an 11-percent interest in the network in August 1995, announced the formation of The WB Television Network. Tribune committed six of the seven independent stations it owned to serve as charter affiliates of The WB, though it initially exempted WGN-TV from the agreement because station management had expressed concerns about the effects the network's expansion plans for its prime time and daytime programs would affect WGN's sports-broadcast rights and the effect the possible phasing out of its sports telecasts to fulfill network commitments would have on the superstation feed's appeal to U.S. cable and satellite providers. Despite its concerns with the WB affiliation, WGN had also vied to become the Chicago affiliate of the United Paramount Network (UPN), a joint venture between Chris-Craft/United Television and Paramount Television that announced its launch plans on October 21. On November 10, 1993, Paramount announced it had reached an agreement to affiliate UPN with Newsweb Corporation-owned WPWR-TV which, upon the network's launch on January 16, 1995, became the largest independently owned UPN affiliate.

On December 3, 1993, Tribune reached a separate agreement with Time Warner that would allow WGN-TV to serve as The WB's Chicago affiliate and allow its companion superstation feed to act as a de facto national WB feed until the network was able to fill remaining gaps in affiliate coverage in "white area" markets that lacked an independent station following its launch. In exchange, The WB agreed to reduce its initial program offerings to one night per week from two to limit conflicts with WGN's sports programming. The superstation feed, which by that time reached 37 percent of the U.S., would extend the network's initial coverage to 73 percent of all television-owning U.S. households. (Note: Before that deal, The WB had considered affiliating with WGBO-TV, which Univision later purchased and converted into an owned-and-operated station of the Spanish-language network on December 30, 1994. United Video intended to provide an alternate feed of WGN with substitute programming for markets with a WB affiliate; however, no such measure was taken, creating network duplication in markets where over-the-air WB affiliates were forced to compete with the WGN cable feed.) WGN-TV and its superstation feed became a charter affiliate of The WB when the network launched on January 11, 1995. Upon joining The WB, WGN's programming remained mostly unchanged, continuing to feature syndicated programs, feature films, and locally produced shows. Because The WB initially offered prime time programs only on Wednesdays, channel 9 filled the 7-to-9 p.m. time slot, leading into its late-evening newscast, with feature films or, from September 1995 until September 1997, programs from the ad-hoc Action Pack syndication block on nights when no sports events were scheduled. By the time The WB adopted a Sunday-though-Friday, six-night-a-week schedule in September 1999, the station had moved its prime time film presentations to Saturday nights.

WGN-TV chose not to clear the network's Kids' WB block, instead airing a local morning newscast and an afternoon sitcom block on weekdays, and a mix of news, public affairs, and paid programs on Saturday mornings. On February 19, WCIU-TV—which had become a full-time, English-language, independent as a result of Univision, from which it had aired programming on a part-time basis, moving to WGBO the month prior—reached an agreement with Time Warner to carry the Kids' WB lineup and to take on responsibilities of airing WB programs at times when WGN was scheduled to air sporting events during prime time. (Note: Although the network's programming was split between WGN-TV and WCIU locally beginning with the Kids' WB block's September 9, 1995, debut, the WGN superstation feed carried The WB's prime time and children's programs until the stopgap network feed was discontinued.) Even as Chicago's network-owned stations began adopting network-centric station branding during the mid-to-late 1990s, WGN-TV continued to be referred to on-air as either "WGN Channel 9" or "Channel 9"; by 1999, the station began to be mainly referred to as "WGN", as had the national feed since 1997. By that time, WGN replaced its late-night feature film presentations, except for the Saturday Action Theater showcase, with syndicated sitcoms.

WGN-TV's second and final logo as a WB affiliate, used from 2002 to 2006.

During the latter half of the 1990s, most of The WB's remaining national coverage gaps were filled through standalone affiliations with UPN charter affiliates, leftover independents, and former noncommercial stations, as well as dual affiliations with existing network outlets—mainly UPN stations—in the top-100 media markets, and through the September 1998 launch of The WeB—subsequently renamed The WB 100+ Station Group—a packaged feed of WB network and syndicated programs provided to participating cable-based affiliates in the 110 smallest markets. In January 1999, Time Warner and Tribune mutually agreed to stop relaying WB programming over the WGN superstation feed, starting from that year's fourth quarter; this move took effect on October 6 and the WGN national feed replaced The WB's prime time and children's lineups, respectively, with movies and syndicated programs. By 2002, game shows, and talk and reality series, had been added to the station's schedule, while syndicated animated series were added on weekend mornings. WGN-TV—which continued to carry the network locally—began clearing the entire WB network schedule in September 2004, when it assumed the rights to the Kids' WB lineup from WCIU-TV, effectively becoming the sole station in the Chicago market to run cartoons on weekday afternoons. WGN continued to carry Kids' WB's remaining Saturday morning lineup, which initially aired in January 2006 on a tape-delayed basis on Sunday mornings, after The WB replaced the block's two-hour weekday-afternoon slot with the Daytime WB rerun block.

=== Affiliation with The CW and superstation programming split (2006–2016) ===
On January 24, 2006, the Warner Bros. Entertainment division of Time Warner and CBS Corporation announced the formation of The CW, a network that would initially feature a mix of programs originating on The WB and UPN—which Time Warner and CBS, respectively, would shut down upon The CW's launch—and new series that were to be developed for The CW. In conjunction with the launch announcement, Tribune signed a ten-year agreement involving 16 of the group's 19 WB affiliates (including WGN-TV), which would join eleven CBS-owned stations to form The CW's initial group of charter affiliates. Because The CW primarily chose its original affiliates based on the highest-overall viewership in each market of the existing WB and UPN affiliates, WGN-TV was chosen as its Chicago affiliate over WPWR-TV; WGN-TV had been the higher-rated of the two stations dating to WPWR's sign-on. On February 22, Fox announced WPWR and nine other non-Fox-O&O stations (Note: Eight UPN stations, consisting of four in other major markets where The CW chose to align with a Tribune station; and four based in non-Tribune markets, and one independent station.) would become the initial charter outlets of MyNetworkTV, a joint venture between Fox Television Stations and Twentieth Television meant to fill the two weeknight prime time hours that would be opened up on UPN- and WB-affiliated stations that were not chosen to become CW charter outlets. The CW did not commission the WGN national feed—which became known as Superstation WGN in November 2002 and then as WGN America in August 2008—to act as a national default feed for the network because it could maintain sufficient national coverage at launch through conventional over-the-air and digital multicast affiliates in the 100 largest markets, as well as supplementary coverage in the remaining 110 markets through The CW Plus, a small-market feed comprising primary and subchannel-only over-the-air affiliates as well as cable-only affiliates that were part of the predecessor WB 100+ service.

WGN-TV's second CW logo, used from 2011 to 2017. It was originally rendered with a blue box instead of a red box from 2006 to 2011.

WGN-TV remained an affiliate of The WB until the network ceased operations on September 17, 2006; it became a charter affiliate of The CW the following day when that network debuted. WPWR had disaffiliated from UPN on September 4 and began carrying MyNetworkTV programming upon that network's September 5 launch. WGN-TV had been one of The CW's high-rated affiliates in terms of viewership, often drawing more viewers than Fox-owned WFLD, even in prime time. WGN-TV carried the entire CW schedule from the network's launch, including its children's program blocks Kids' WB, The CW4Kids/Toonzai, Vortexx, and One Magnificent Morning); from September 2013 to September 2016, however, WGN aired the network's daytime talk show block, which had been reduced to one hour from two in September 2011, one hour earlier (at 2 p.m.) than other CW affiliates in the Central Time Zone, aligning with the block's East Coast airtime. WGN-TV gradually evolved its programming during the late 2000s and 2010s, adopting a news-intensive format, expanding its news production to 70 hours per week by 2016, and shifting its weekday daytime lineup towards mainly first-run talk and game shows during the daytime hours. Because fewer film packages were offered on the syndication market, its weekend schedule also relied less on feature films and shifted toward local lifestyle and tourism programs, and additional first-run and off-network syndicated shows.

On April 1, 2007, Chicago-based real estate investor Sam Zell announced plans to purchase the Tribune Company in an $8.2-billion leveraged buyout that gave Tribune employees stock and effective ownership of the company. The transaction and privatization of the company were completed upon termination of Tribune stock at the close of trading on December 20, 2007. Before the sale's closure, excluding network-owned stations, WGN-TV was one of two commercial television stations in the Chicago market (Note: Along with WCIU-TV, which has been owned by Weigel Broadcasting since its February 1964 sign-on.) to have never been involved in an ownership transaction. On December 8, 2008, Tribune filed for Chapter 11 bankruptcy protection, citing a debt load of around $13 billion, making it the largest media bankruptcy in American corporate history. Tribune had accrued this debt from the Zell buyout and related privatization costs, and from a sharp downturn in revenue from newspaper advertising. After four years, on December 31, 2012, Tribune formally exited from bankruptcy under the control of its senior debt holders, Oaktree Capital Management, JPMorgan Chase, and Angelo, Gordon & Co. On July 10, 2013, Tribune announced plans to spin off its broadcasting and newspaper interests into two separate companies. WGN-TV and WGN Radio would remain with the original entity, which was renamed Tribune Media and was restructured to focus on the company's broadcasting, digital and real estate properties. The newspaper division, which included the Chicago Tribune, Los Angeles Times, South Florida Sun-Sentinel and Baltimore Sun, became the standalone entity Tribune Publishing, which became known as Tronc from June 2016 until the company reverted to its former name in October 2018. The split was completed on August 4, 2014, ending Tribune's joint ownership with WGN-TV and WGN Radio after 66 and 94 years, respectively. WGN-TV continues to maintain a content partnership with Tribune.

On December 13, 2014, Tribune converted the WGN America national feed into a conventional cable channel that focused on acquired and original programs, containing significantly more domestic and international programming than the channel did before its separation from WGN-TV, and switched from a royalty to a retransmission consent revenue model. As a result, WGN America immediately ceased simulcasts of WGN-TV's Chicago-originated local programming, which was limited to its weekday noon and, until that simulcast was dropped the previous February, nightly 9 p.m. newscasts, news specials, public affairs, special events, and sports telecasts, alongside off-network syndicated reruns, religious programs, and feature films acquired for the Chicago feed. Starting with its addition to Comcast Xfinity's Chicago-area systems on December 16, the changeover allowed cable and IPTV subscribers within the market—as local satellite viewers had been able to do for about two decades—to receive WGN America for the first time. (Note: As a result of the October 2007 separation of TBS from its Atlanta parent WTBS, WGN America had been the last remaining national superstation to be distributed to cable, IPTV, fiber optic and satellite television providers, whereas the other six remaining superstations are distributed outside their home regions mainly on satellite.) Due to the separation of the local and national feeds, WGN-TV did not carry WGN America's original drama series, such as Salem and Manhattan, outside of preview promotions, limiting the local availability of these programs to subscribers of DirecTV and Dish Network, and through WGN America's streaming agreement with Hulu. WGN-TV regained national availability in the second quarter of 2015, when Channel Master included the Chicago feed with the initial offerings of its LinearTV over-the-top streaming service.

=== Return to independence (2016–2024) ===
On May 23, 2016, after a year of protracted negotiations of financial terms—including the share of reverse compensation that Tribune paid to keep CW programming on those stations—Tribune Broadcasting and CBS Corporation reached a five-year agreement that allowed twelve of Tribune's thirteen CW-affiliated stations to remain with the network until 2021. Tribune exempted WGN-TV from the renewed agreement, intending to free up its schedule to offer more coverage of Chicago Cubs, White Sox, Bulls, and Blackhawks games in prime time during the calendar year, thereby giving WGN over-the-air exclusivity over all sporting events it was contracted to broadcast for the first time since 1993. The WB and The CW each contractually limited the number of network program preemptions, other than those caused by long-form breaking news coverage, that could occur on an annual basis; in compliance with these restrictions, WGN-TV purchased airtime on CLTV from 1993 to 2002, WCIU-TV from 1999 to 2015, and WPWR-TV from 2015 to 2016, to carry the about-thirty sports telecasts it was contracted to produce each year. WB and CW network programs that were displaced from their regular schedule were shown on a tape-delayed basis later in the week, usually in a graveyard slot or on a weekend evening that was not occupied by a scheduled game telecast; neither The WB nor The CW aired prime time programs on Saturdays, and the network had no Sunday programming from September 2009 until October 2018.

Concurrently, Fox announced WPWR would take over as Chicago's CW affiliate. (Note: This was the second time Fox Television Stations had owned a CW-affiliated station; under an existing contract that was already scheduled to expire before that station's conversion into a Fox O&O was announced, Charlotte sister station WJZY continued to carry the network's programming for about 3 1/2 months after its purchase by Fox was finalized in April 2013) On September 1, WGN-TV reverted to independent status, marking the first time in 21 years it was not affiliated with a major broadcast network. Timeslots that were previously occupied by CW network shows were mainly filled with syndicated programs on weekdays and an expanded weekend-morning newscast, station-produced lifestyle programs and syndicated educational programs on weekends. Beginning the same day, all CW programming moved to WPWR-TV, resulting in the weeknight-only MyNetworkTV schedule being shifted to air on a three-hour delay from 10 p.m. to midnight. (Note: WPWR displaced WLVI in Boston as the largest CW station that was not owned by either Tribune or CBS Corporation.) (Note: The CW eventually moved to WCIU-TV on September 1, 2019, marking the first time channel 26—which had maintained part-time affiliations with the Spanish International Network and successor Univision, NetSpan/Telemundo, and The WB [by way of Kids' WB] at various points between 1968 and 2004—had ever served as a full-time network affiliate.)

=== Aborted sale to Sinclair Broadcast Group; sale to Nexstar Media Group ===
Sinclair Broadcast Group announced its purchase of Tribune Media on May 8, 2017, for $3.9 billion, a deal that station employees publicly criticized due to concerns about the influence the conservative-leaning group could have on WGN's news content. To meet regulatory compliance, Sinclair divested WGN-TV to a limited liability company controlled by Baltimore-based automotive dealer Steven Fader—who has acted as a business associate to Sinclair executive chairman David Smith—for $60 million. Under the terms of the deal, Sinclair planned to operate the station through programming and sales service agreements, and would hold an option to repurchase it within eight years. Following FCC chairman Ajit Pai's public criticism of the proposed deal, Sinclair abandoned the deal and disclosed it would instead directly acquire WGN-TV. Despite this, the FCC voted to bring the merger up for a hearing by an administrative law judge, prompting Tribune Media to terminate the deal on August 9, 2018, and file a breach of contract lawsuit.

Following the collapse of the Sinclair merger, Nexstar Media Group agreed to acquire Tribune's assets on December 3, 2018, for $6.4 billion in cash and debt. The transaction received approval by the FCC on September 16, 2019, and it was finalized three days later.

=== Return to CW as an O&O (2024–present) ===
On May 1, 2024, it was announced that WGN-TV would rejoin The CW on September 1 after the network's affiliation agreement with WCIU-TV expired on August 31, as the network under Nexstar control has taken a more sports-centric direction more complementary to WGN-TV than in the past.

== Programming ==
=== Locally produced programs ===
==== Current ====
WGN-TV currently produces the following programs, some of which were previously rebroadcast on CLTV:

- Adelante, Chicago (transl. Onward, Chicago) is a bi-weekly public affairs program, airing alternate Saturdays at 6:30 a.m. It debuted on February 19, 2000, and was originally hosted by Eddie Arruza. As of December 2025, it is hosted by Lourdes Duarte and focuses on Chicago's Hispanic community and culture.
- People to People is a bi-weekly public affairs program airing Saturdays at 6:30 a.m. alternating with Adelante, Chicago; it debuted in 1973, with local civil rights leader Edwin C. "Bill" Berry as its original host. As of December 2025, its current host is Micah Materre. The program focuses on community events and topical discussions for the African-American community.
- Daytime Chicago is a morning lifestyle program airing weekdays at 10 a.m.; it premiered on September 13, 2021. Hosted by Tonya Francisco and Amy Rutledge, it features segments focusing on subjects such as fashion, cooking, travel, and the arts.
- Spotlight Chicago is an afternoon lifestyle program airing weekdays at 1 p.m. that premiered on September 11, 2023. Hosted by Ji Suk Yi and Sarah Jindra, it features local events, people, attractions and organizations.
- WGN-TV Political Report, which airs Sundays at 9 a.m. and premiered on January 12, 2020, is a weekly political talk show in which hosts Paul Lisnek and Tahman Bradley, and discusses Chicago-area and national political issues.
- BackStory with Larry Potash is a half-hour historical series that premiered on October 18, 2018. Hosted by Larry Potash and airing Sundays at 11 p.m., the program looks at history, culture, religion, and science.

In addition, Channel 9 broadcasts several local events including the Chicago Thanksgiving Parade (which has aired since 2007, under an agreement with the Chicago Festival Association by which the WGN national feed—which continues to carry the parade despite WGN America's December 2014 programming separation from WGN-TV—was given national simulcast rights), the Chicago St. Patrick's Day Parade (which aired from 1949 to 2002), the Chicago Auto Show (from 1952 to 1992 and again since 1999), and the Philadelphia-based Mummers Parade (by arrangement with sister station WPHL-TV). Local events that WGN-TV aired in previous years have included the Bud Billiken Parade (from 1978 to 2011, with WCIU-TV obtaining primary rights to the broadcast beginning in 2012, before shifting exclusively to WLS-TV—which had been a partial rightsholder for the parade since 1984—in 2014).

==== Former ====
Former WGN-TV shows include:

- The Bozo Show, a long-running children's program that aired under various titles and formats. It was WGN-TV's most successful local program in terms of both ratings and cultural impact, and became the best-known iteration of the Bozo franchise partly as a result of the exposure it received after WGN became a national superstation in 1978. At the peak of its popularity, ticket reservations for the show's studio audience surpassed a ten-year backlog. In response to Chicago Public Schools rule changes that disallowed students from going home for lunch, the program was moved to weekday mornings and switched to a pre-taped format in August 1980. To accommodate the launch of the WGN Morning News, Bozo was moved to Sunday mornings in September 1994, remaining there until it was discontinued in 2001. For the final four years of its run, The Bozo Super Sunday Show incorporated segments compliant with FCC educational programming requirements.
- Charlando (transl. Chatting), a Spanish-language talk show that aired from 1964 to 1999; it focused on Chicago's Hispanic and Latino communities. The program originally aired on Saturday mornings until 1992, when it was moved to Sundays. It was hosted by Peter Nuno for its entire 35-year run.
- Creature Features, a local version of a horror-film franchise which aired Saturday nights from September 19, 1970, until May 19, 1976; the show featured classic horror and science fiction films released between the 1930s and the 1950s. The films were presented by a disembodied voice known only as "The Creature" (Carl Greyson and Marty McNeeley). After the WGN version ended, the title, unpluralized, was used by WFLD for its weekend horror movie presentations until 1979.
- Family Classics, a showcase of family-oriented feature films that ran from September 14, 1962, to December 25, 2000, and was co-created by Frazier Thomas and Fred Silverman. Thomas also selected and bowdlerized the feature films; Roy Leonard took over hosting duties following Thomas's death in April 1985 and remained in that role until Family Classics ended its initial run. (Note: After airing weekly throughout the fall-to-spring television season—first on Friday nights until 1986, and then on Sunday afternoons thereafter—for most of its run, the program began airing sporadically during the holiday season from November 1993 until the end of the program's original run.) Family Classics was revived as an occasional series on December 8, 2017, with longtime entertainment reporter Dean Richards as host.
- Garfield Goose and Friends, a children's program that aired on WGN-TV from September 1955 to October 1976. (Note: Originating on WBKB/WBBM-TV and then WBKB/WLS-TV under the title Garfield Goose and Friend (unpluralized) from 1952 to 1955.) It is considered the longest-running puppet show on television, the series was hosted by Frazier Thomas as the "prime minister" to the titular clacking goose puppet (puppeteered by Roy Brown), who designated himself as "King of the United States". The WGN-TV run of the program featured a mix of puppet characters developed by Brown, before and after the show's move to Channel 9. The show also featured animated shorts and educational segments.
- Issues Unlimited, a Sunday morning public affairs program moderated by Chicago Bulletin editor and columnist Hurley Green Sr. from 1971 to 1987; the program featured a panel of local media representatives interviewing local and national newsmakers.
- Ray Rayner and His Friends (originally Breakfast with Bugs Bunny from 1962 to 1964), a long-running children's program hosted by Ray Rayner from 1962 to 1980. The program featured animated shorts, arts-and-crafts segments, animal characters, science segments conducted with J. Bruce Mitchell of the Museum of Science and Industry and a viewer mail segment in which Rayner appeared alongside a talking orange dog puppet, Cuddly Dudley (voiced by Roy Brown).

WGN-TV formerly served as the Muscular Dystrophy Association (MDA)'s "Love Network" station for Chicago, carrying the charity's annual telethon on Labor Day and the preceding Sunday night each September from 1973 to 2012. (Note: In its original 21 1/2-hour format that existed until 2010, the six-hour evening format used in 2011 and the three-hour prime time-only format used in 2012.) For most of its run on the station, except in 1994, due to that year's Major League Baseball strike, WGN-TV would preempt portions of the telethon on Labor Day to carry Chicago Cubs or White Sox games held during the afternoon of the holiday. Through its national distribution, beginning with the 1979 event, donations to the WGN-produced local segments of the telethon were also pledged by viewers in other parts of the U.S. and Canada. The broadcast moved from syndication to ABC in September 2013 (as a two-hour special), airing thereafter by association on WLS-TV until the final telecast of the retitled MDA Show of Strength in August 2014.

=== Studio facilities ===
The station's Bradley Place studios produces a large number of its own programs, and has been used to produce nationally syndicated programs, including Donahue, (Note: Donahue shifted production from the Dayton, Ohio, studios of WLWD [now sister station WDTN] to the WGN-TV facilities in Chicago in 1974, where production remained before moving to WBBM-TV's Streeterville studios in January 1982.) U.S. Farm Report, (Note: U.S. Farm Report originated from the Bradley Place facility from the agriculture program's national syndication debut in 1975 until production moved to South Bend, Indiana, after Farm Journal's production unit assumed distribution rights from Tribune Entertainment in 2008.) and At the Movies. (Note: At the Movies was produced from the facility from 1982 until 1990, three years after Gene Siskel and Roger Ebert left the program amid a 1986 contract dispute with Tribune Entertainment to develop Siskel & Ebert & the Movies with Buena Vista Television, which was produced out of WBBM-TV's studios and later WLS-TV's North State Street studios.)

=== Lottery ===
WGN-TV served as the originating station for the Illinois Lottery beginning at the lottery's July 1974 inception. Live drawings were part of a half-hour Thursday-night broadcast hosted by Ray Rayner at the Bradley Place studios. WGN-TV shared the drawing rights with WSNS-TV from March to May 1975, and again from September 1975 until August 1977, when WGN gained exclusivity over the telecasts. With the introduction of the Daily Game (now Pick 3) in February 1980, drawings began airing at 6:57 p.m. nightly. After a three-year run on WFLD, which assumed drawing rights in January 1984, the Lottery moved the drawing telecasts back to WGN-TV in January 1987. In August 1992, the Lottery awarded the telecast rights to its drawings and game show to CBS-owned WBBM, who outbid WGN and WLS-TV, and saw the move as a way to help improve viewership for its third-place-ranked 10 p.m. newscast—effective December 28. (Note: WBBM's bid was chosen for its offer to hold the drawings during its late newscast, which ultimately produced no beneficial ratings impact, and agreed to handle promotion and production costs.) Citing in part the station's statewide cable distribution (which, after the SyndEx rules were implemented, would occasionally subject the evening drawings to preemption associated with that of the delayed 9 p.m. newscast when sports clearance restrictions applied to the WGN national feed), the Lottery moved its telecasts back to WGN on January 1, 1994, citing declining revenues under the WBBM contract. The live evening results were shifted to 9:22 p.m. Midday drawings for Pick 3 and Pick 4 were introduced on December 20, 1994. The 12:40 p.m. drawings were shown during WGN's noon newscast on weekdays, while Saturday drawings were usually not shown live nationally because of programming substitutions.

In addition to the live drawing results, WGN also carried two lottery-produced, weekly game shows. From September 16, 1989, to December 19, 1992, and from January 8 to July 2, 1994, the station aired $100,000 Fortune Hunt. It was originally hosted by Jeff Coopwood with co-host Linda Kollmeyer, and subsequently with Mike Jackson as host. In the program, six contestants selected from a scratch-off entry-ticket drawing choose panels from a numbered, 36-panel game board containing dollar amounts. The player with the highest prize amount after five rounds won $100,000, and their two chosen, at-home partners won $500 each. The remaining on-air contestants kept their existing winnings, and their partners received $100. (Note: Initially, each on-air contestant was given the option of keeping their winnings or trading them for other prizes.) Its successor, Illinois Instant Riches (retitled Illinois' Luckiest in 1998), ran from July 9, 1994, to October 21, 2000, with Mark Goodman and Kollmeyer as co-hosts. It was produced in conjunction with Mark Goodson Productions—later Jonathan Goodson Productions. (Note: Illinois Instant Riches had a similar drawing format to its predecessor, but had individual contestants chosen randomly by a wheel spun by Kollmeyer each round, which was hooked to lights above each contestant's seat, play mini-games.)

In September 1996, WGN-TV began carrying The Big Game multi-state drawing each Tuesday and Friday; this was replaced by Mega Millions in May 2002. Powerball drawings were eventually added upon Illinois joining that multi-state lottery in January 2010. WGN America ceased carrying the drawings on December 12, 2014; the Lottery ceased televising its daily drawings and moved the results for the Pick 3, Pick 4, Lotto with Extra Shot, and Lucky Day Lotto (formerly Little Lotto until 2011) games exclusively to its website on October 1, 2015, and switched to a random number generator structure.

=== Sports programming ===
WGN-TV has had a long association with Chicago sports, having regularly televised games of most of the city's major professional sports franchises—particularly the Chicago Cubs, White Sox, Bulls, and Blackhawks—and several local and regional collegiate teams (including the Illinois Fighting Illini, the Northwestern Wildcats, the DePaul Blue Demons, and the Notre Dame Fighting Irish, as well as Big Ten Conference universities).

The Cubs and White Sox were the first teams to be carried on the station, when on April 23, 1948, WGN aired a crosstown rivalry game the Sox won 4–1. (Note: The Tribune Company wholly owned the Cubs from 1981 until 2008, and retained a minority interest in the team until January 2019.) The number of Cubs and White Sox games on WGN gradually decreased to about 70 per season for each team by 2008 as a result of the two Major League Baseball clubs—as well as the NBA's Bulls—moving some of their local-game telecasts to cable-originated regional sports networks: Fox Sports Net Chicago (later FSN Chicago) from 1999 until 2003 and then Comcast SportsNet Chicago (now NBC Sports Chicago) from 2004. Beginning in 2015, WGN-TV began sharing the over-the-air rights to Cubs games with WLS-TV, resulting in WGN-TV reducing its coverage to 45 games per season as part of a four-year contract involving the two stations. WGN carried the White Sox until 1972, and for one season in 1981. The White Sox moved its local telecasts to WGN-TV after an eight-year absence in 1990.

WGN-TV began carrying the Bulls' games in the team's inaugural season in 1966; after WFLD carried its games for four years, the Bulls returned to WGN-TV for the 1989–90 season, overlapping with the start of the team's NBA championship dynasty during Michael Jordan's tenure with the team. WGN initially carried away games of the NHL's Blackhawks, whose then-owner Bill Wirtz had prohibited broadcasts of home games to sustain ticket sales, from 1961 until 1975. The Blackhawks returned to the station during the 2008–09 season, with a package of home and away games, following Rocky Wirtz's decision to end the home game television blackout after inheriting the franchise following his father's death. WGN-TV carried Chicago Bears regular season football games as a DuMont affiliate during the 1951 NFL season, after which the team moved its telecasts to ABC and, by association, ABC O&O WBKB-TV (now WLS-TV) under a limited contract. The Bears' first game on WGN in 55 years was broadcast on October 1, 2012, when the station carried the team's Monday Night Football (MNF) game against the Dallas Cowboys. (Note: NFL rules require national games aired by cable networks to be syndicated to broadcast stations in the participating teams' home markets.) Although WLS-TV has right of first refusal to MNF due to its corporate parent The Walt Disney Company's majority ownership of ESPN, WLS decided not to carry the game so it could air that night's live broadcast of ABC's Dancing with the Stars.

From November 1978 until October 2014, WGN America frequently simulcast WGN Sports broadcasts—mostly Cubs, White Sox and Bulls games—nationwide, when permitted under the station's sports contracts. (Note: Tribune's President and CEO Peter Liguori cited the limited viewership and advertising revenue generated from televising sports on a national basis relative to their contractual expense for its decision to stop carrying WGN's sports telecasts over WGN America after the 2014 MLB season.) Until it ceased offering sporting events in September 2019, WGN-TV also distributed its White Sox and Bulls telecasts to television stations in Illinois, Indiana, and Iowa that are within their respective broadcast territories, including CW affiliate WISH-TV in Indianapolis, and the subchannels of WGN sister stations WHO-DT, in Des Moines, and WQAD, in Davenport, Iowa. WGN-TV's Cubs and White Sox game broadcasts were also often carried on the MLB Extra Innings feeds available to DirecTV subscribers. (Note: These sometimes included local commercials and station promotions that were not shown during the WGN America telecasts from the imposition of the SyndEx rules until the 2014 separation of the national and local feeds. This also was the case for WGN-produced games shown on WPWR-TV, as well as WLS-TV's Cubs broadcasts.)

On January 2, 2019, the White Sox, Bulls, and Blackhawks agreed to an exclusive multi-year deal with NBC Sports Chicago that would take effect that year's third quarter. On February 13, the formation of the Marquee Sports Network, a joint venture between the Cubs and Sinclair Broadcast Group that launched in early 2020, was announced. Due to the four teams choosing to completely remove their local game telecasts off broadcast television in favor of exclusively airing them on regional sports networks, WGN-TV wound down its local sports coverage during early-to-mid 2019, beginning with the April 1 game between the Blackhawks and Winnipeg Jets. As the station's contracts with all four teams gradually expired, its final game telecasts involved the Bulls' away game against New York Knicks on April 9, and the Cubs' away game against the rival St. Louis Cardinals on September 27.

WGN-TV's final sports telecast involving any of the station's four legacy professional teams was the second game of a White Sox–Detroit Tigers doubleheader at Guaranteed Rate Field on September 28, 2019. On February 19, 2020, however, Chicago Fire FC announced a multi-year agreement with WGN-TV to broadcast its Major League Soccer (MLS) games, beginning with its March 7 match against the New England Revolution, returning regular sporting events to WGN-TV after seven months. Those games moved to MLS Season Pass beginning in 2023, and without any NFL-style syndication rights, the 2022 season was the final season for Fire broadcasts on any television channel. The deal also marked the first time in the station's 74-year history there would not be any local sports programming on the station.

Sports programming returned to WGN in 2023, when it began carrying The CW's weekend coverage of the controversial LIV Golf league in lieu of then-affiliate WCIU, (Note: This was a reversal of the programming relationship between the two stations during WGN-TV's WB and initial CW affiliations.) which declined to carry the tournament broadcasts due to existing weekend programming commitments. Later that year, WGN also acquired rights to the network's Atlantic Coast Conference football and men's basketball game telecasts, which WCIU also chose not to cover. The CW's sports programming moved to WGN-TV full-time upon it becoming an owned-and-operated station in September 2024.

=== News operation ===
WGN News logo, used since 2017

WGN-TV presently broadcasts 91 1/2 hours of locally produced newscasts each week; these consist of 16 hours each weekday, six hours on Saturdays, and 5 1/2 hours on Sundays. It has the highest number of hours of newscast output of any television station in Chicago and Illinois, and the sixth-highest newscast output in the U.S. (Note: Behind WAGA-TV/Atlanta, WHDH/Boston, KTVK/Phoenix, WISH-TV/Indianapolis, and WGN sister station KTLA/Los Angeles.) The station also produces two late-evening sports-news programs: 'GN Sports is a half-hour highlights-and-interview program airing nightly at 10:30 p.m., and Instant Replay is a Sunday-evening highlights program that comprises the final 20 minutes of the 9 p.m. newscast.

Until regular sports telecasts on WGN-TV ended in September 2019, the station's midday, early- and late-evening newscasts were subject to delay or cancellation due to sports coverage overrunning into those time periods. From July 8, 2010, onward, CLTV had served as an alternative broadcaster of WGN-TV newscasts that were preempted by the latter's sports broadcasts. CLTV aired live, half-hour editions of WGN News at Nine on nights when WGN-TV carried a sports event in the West Coast that started at 9 p.m. local time. An additional half-hour live newscast followed the game telecast on WGN-TV, a newscast that had originally been titled WGN News at Nine before the 2016 launch of its 10 p.m. newscast. The WGN-TV weather staff also provides local weather updates for WGN Radio under an agreement that began on October 13, 2008, at the conclusion of The Weather Channel's ten-year contract with the radio station.

==== News department history ====
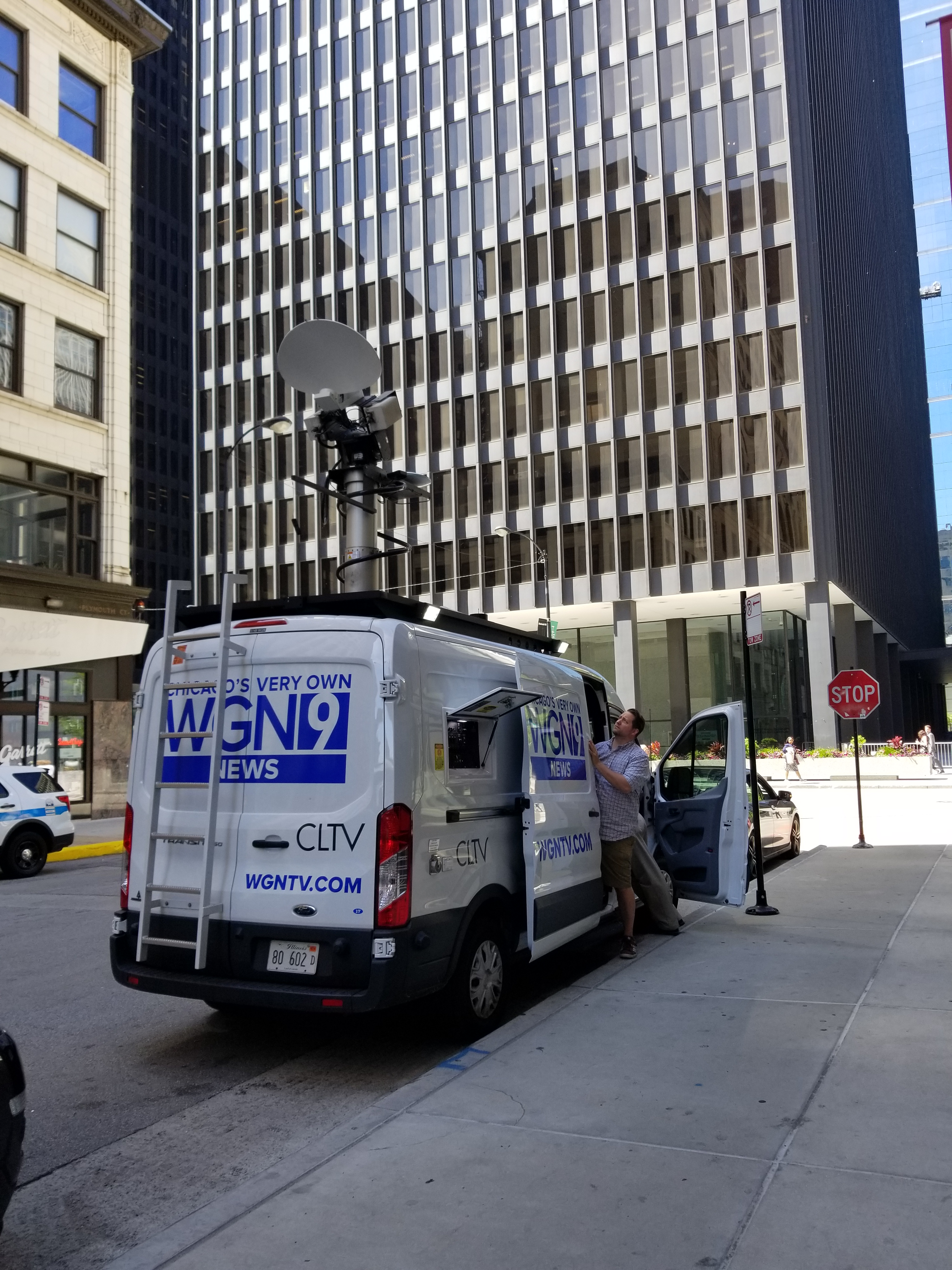
News van outside the Dirksen Federal Building in June 2018.

WGN-TV has been well known in the Chicago area for its news programming which, through its former co-ownership with Chicago Tribune, has played an important role since its launch. The WGN-TV news department has long been one of the most-respected local television news operations in the U.S. and has won several journalism awards, including Emmy, Associated Press, United Press International, and duPont-Columbia Awards. The station's pool of news anchors and reporters has including Jack Taylor (1954–1984), (Note: Taylor's career included a stint as primary weeknight anchor from 1970 to 1979.) Carl Greyson (1955–1980), Marty McNeeley (1969–1986), Robert Jordan (1973–1978 and 1980–2016), Muriel Clair (1978–present), Dan Roan (1984–2022), and Steve Sanders (1982–2020). WGN's news department shared operations and management with WGN Radio until 1983, when the news division was split into separate departments maintained by the respective properties.

WGN-TV's news department began operations on April 5, 1948, with the launch of its first regular news program, Chicagoland Newsreel, which was Chicago's first television newscast to consist entirely of filmed coverage. The 15-minute broadcast originally aired weeknights at 6:45 p.m., and a midday edition at 11:30 a.m. was added in September 1949. The program was anchored by news director Spencer Allen, who had been a reporter and news writer for WGN Radio since 1938. It had a large staff of photographers and technicians, many of whom had worked for the Tribune. Allen also anchored a 15-minute midday news program, Spencer Allen and the News, from 1951 to 1953.

From 1948 to 1965, WGN-TV produced an additional 15-minute-long newscast at 6:30 p.m.; this was presented by Austin Kiplinger, who was replaced in 1953 by Allen and then by Lloyd Pettit in 1956. The anchor read the news summary and Frann Weigel was the weather anchor. The program was expanded to a half-hour in September 1955, when Newsreel was discontinued in favor of an amended sports-news segment that was anchored by Vince Lloyd. Under Allen's leadership, WGN-TV's newscasts evolved from a "police blotter/fire alarm-type of news operation" to incorporating more in-depth and investigative reports. WGN-TV was the first Chicago television station to televise a local appearance by a U.S. President during Harry S. Truman's 1948 visit to Chicago. The station also provided mobile coverage of Gen. Douglas MacArthur's visit to the city in April 1951. It has also provided coverage of the Republican and Democratic presidential conventions each election cycle since 1952, and extensive pool coverage of Pope John Paul II's Mass at Grant Park in 1979.

In September 1951, WGN-TV began carrying a 15-minute, late-night edition of Chicagoland Newsreel that followed its late-evening movie presentations. By 1967, the program had evolved into Night Beat, a 30-minute overnight newscast in which the main anchor, which included Greyson, McNeeley, Cliff Mercer, and Jack Taylor, presented a summary of local and world news headlines, and a brief weather-forecast summary. Night Beat was discontinued in 1983. In February 1955, the station installed a coaxial cable link from the city room of the Chicago Tribune (originally done for the early newscast, First Edition, which aired from 1954 to 1956) to allow Tribune reporters and contributors to comment on developing stories being covered by the newspaper and the WGN news department. After WGN-TV became an independent station in August 1956, the evening newscast was moved to 7 p.m., becoming the market's first prime time newscast and was often canceled or postponed due to sports coverage. The evening newscast was moved to 10 p.m. in September 1959, originally under the title 10th Hour News, and later as The Park-Ruddle News and [Jack Taylor/John Drury and] NewsNine. In May 1960, the late newscast, which by that point was anchored by Jim Conway, became the first local-television news program in the U.S. to expand to a half-hour broadcast. Standard news updates, which were presented by on-staff anchors under the title WGN Newsbreak, also ran during the late morning, early afternoon, and prime time hours in-between programs.

In 1965, WGN-TV appointed the first dual-anchor team in Chicago television news; the team consisted of Gary Park, previously of KCRA-TV in Sacramento, and Jim Ruddle, who previously worked at WTVT in Tampa; they presented evening newscasts. On January 9, 1967, WGN-TV shifted the 10 p.m. edition of the newscast by 15 minutes and reduced it to that length in an attempt to improve viewership by placing the telephone quiz show The Name Game in the timeslot, reducing competition with late newscasts on WLS-TV, WMAQ-TV, and WBBM-TV. This experiment ended in May 1967, when WGN-TV reverted the late newscast timeslot to 10 p.m. and expanded it to 25 minutes. In June 1967, Ruddle left to join NBC-owned WMAQ-TV, to be followed two years later by Park taking a prime time anchor role at KTVU in San Francisco. Also in 1965, WGN premiered its first morning news show Top 'o' the Morning; Orion Samuelson—then a farm reporter for WGN Radio, who would eventually host the syndicated U.S. Farm Report from 1975—and Harold Turner (later replaced by Max Armstrong) provided agricultural news and weather. The program was replaced in May 1984 by a traditional morning newscast, Chicago's First Report, which was canceled due to low viewership that December.

John Drury joined WGN-TV in 1967, and worked for three years as anchor of its 10 p.m. news and occasionally of Night Beat. After working for WLS-TV for nine years, Drury returned to WGN-TV in 1979, displacing Jack Taylor as 10 p.m. NewsNine anchor. During his second stint at WGN-TV, Drury took on an expanded role doing assignments and investigative reporting, often producing the reports with investigative reporter Alex Burkholder. In 1982, Chicago mayor Jane Byrne, accompanied by members of her public relations and cabinet staff, tried to persuade Drury to shelve a report on Byrne's use of public funds for city festivals designed to promote her administration in relation to her stint residing in the Cabrini-Green housing project. Drury persisted with the report, which aided in Byrne's loss to Harold Washington in the 1983 Democratic mayoral primary and helped earn Drury a Chicago Emmy Award for Individual Excellence—the first of four Emmys during his career.

Another mainstay of WGN-TV was Tom Skilling, who joined in August 1978 to succeed weather reporter Harry Volkman (1967–1970 and 1974–mid-1978) as the station's main evening meteorologist. Skilling—who was rumored to have been the highest paid local-television meteorologist in the U.S.—became known for presenting his forecasts with detailed but easy-to-understand analysis and accuracy—most notably his predictions of the Groundhog Day blizzard two weeks before it hit the Chicago area in late January and early February 2011. Skilling made routine use of computer models to illustrate forecasts. Skilling also occasionally hosted half-hour documentary specials explaining extreme weather phenomena and advancements in forecasting technology. (Note: These specials include 1991's It Sounded Like a Freight Train, focusing on the science of the Chicago area's climatological history with tornadoes, and 1992's When Lightning Strikes, which discusses lightning.) Skilling earned several Chicago Emmy nominations and awards. He also presented a weekly feature on the 9 p.m. newscast, Ask Tom Why, in which he answered viewer-submitted weather questions. Under Skilling, WGN-TV centralized its weather operations to include WGN-TV, WGN Radio, CLTV, and the Tribune. In May 2007, the station became a broadcast partner in the automated weather observation network WeatherBug, the largest station member by market size. Skilling holds the record as the longest-serving television meteorologist at a single station in the Chicago market, having served as chief meteorologist at WGN-TV for 45 years until he retired from broadcasting on February 28, 2024. (Note: Volkman holds the record as Chicago's longest-serving television meteorologist overall, having worked in the market from 1959 until he retired from broadcasting in 2004, including other stints at WMAQ-TV and WFLD, and an 18-year run as chief meteorologist at WBBM-TV.)

The late newscast was moved into prime time on March 10, 1980, becoming known as The Nine O'Clock News and from May 1993 as WGN News at Nine, as part of a uniform retitling of its newscasts under the WGN News moniker used since 1981. The shift to the 9 p.m. hour briefly made it the first hour-long prime time newscast in the Midwest and, for its first seven years, it was the Chicago market's only 9 p.m. local television newscast. Initially airing five nights a week, the revamped weeknight-only newscast was first anchored by Drury, Skilling, sports anchor Bill Frink, and commentator Len O'Connor. On June 9 of that year, the program switched to a hybrid local–national format that incorporated Independent Network News (INN)—a Tribune-syndicated nightly news program that was later retitled INN: The Independent News in September 1984 and USA Tonight in January 1987, originating from New York sister station WPIX. This replaced the locally produced segments that had occupied the 9:30 p.m. half-hour since the March format change. After briefly being confined to weeknights following the rescheduling, half-hour weekend editions of the 9 p.m. broadcast were added on October 4, 1980, anchored originally by Larry Roderick and Robert Jordan. By 1985, Drury—who returned to his previous role as main co-anchor at WLS-TV in late 1984—and Denise Cannon, who became the former's co-anchor in 1981 and departed at the end of 1984, were succeeded as principal anchors by Rick Rosenthal and Pat Harvey.

Since the reformatting as a prime time newscast, WGN-TV has been the ratings leader in the 9 p.m. timeslot, and typically holds a larger audience than the 10 p.m. newscast on WBBM-TV. The 9 p.m. newscast's dominance was such that from 1984 until 1989, when it was unseated by KTVU in San Francisco, it had the largest viewership of any prime time local newscast in the United States. Competition for The Nine O'Clock News arrived on November 16, 1987, when Fox O&O WFLD debuted an hour-long 9 p.m. broadcast. (Note: This broadcast replaced the separate half-hour 7 and 11 p.m. newscasts it had been producing since its full-scale news operation launched three months earlier.) Although WFLD aggressively marketed its newscast towards younger audiences as having a fresher style than WGN-TV's more traditional news format, WGN-TV has remained Chicago's top-rated 9 p.m. newscast to the present day, (Note: One of the only exceptions being a tie with Channel 32 in the May 1996 sweeps period) even with the WFLD newscast having the Fox prime time lineup as its lead-in. For this reason, WFLD moved its newscast back to its original 7 p.m. timeslot in September 1988, only to return it to 9 p.m. the following year to accommodate the planned expansion of Fox's prime time lineup. A sports highlight and interview program, Instant Replay, which was hosted by sports director Dan Roan until his retirement in May 2022, began accompanying the newscast's Sunday edition in August 1987. WGN-TV re-expanded its prime time newscast to one hour on June 4, 1990, after Tribune discontinued production of USA Tonight under a contract between Tribune and Turner Broadcasting in which Tribune stations were granted access to CNN Newsource content and began feeding video footage to the CNN video wire service.

WGN began programming long-form news outside its established 9 p.m. slot on September 19, 1983, when it debuted Midday Newscope, which grew out of the three-minute-long local news segments that had aired during the INN Midday Edition since January 1983. (Note: INN Midday Edition followed the newscast until that program's September 1985 cancellation.) Originally anchored by Rick Rosenthal, who was replaced in 1984 by Steve Sanders, the newscast—a local version of Telepictures and Gannett Broadcasting's short-lived syndicated format, Newscope—included local news headlines, weather forecasts, and in-depth consumer, financial, entertainment, and lifestyle features. The program was reformatted into a more traditional newscast and retitled Chicago's Midday News on September 17, 1984, and was expanded to an hour in September 1985. The midday newscast was concurrently rebranded from WGN News at Noon to WGN Midday News with the expansion and eventually expanded to 90 minutes, moving to an 11:30 a.m. start, on September 15, 2008. WGN Midday News was expanded to two hours, moving to 11 a.m., on October 5, 2009. On September 19, 1988, WGN became the first Chicago television station to closed caption its newscasts for the hearing impaired.

On January 25, 1992, the station debuted hour-long 8 a.m. newscasts on Saturdays and Sundays. To accommodate the launch of Chicago's Weekend Morning News, (Note: Chicago's Weekend Morning News was the first major weekend morning news program in Chicago television and one of the only instances of a television station carrying a weekend morning newscast without already having a weekday equivalent.) and the concurring moves of Charlando and People to People to Sundays, WGN-TV dropped the long-running religious programs What's Nu, Heritage of Faith, and Mass for Shut-ins from its Sunday morning lineup; the Council of Religious Leaders of Metropolitan Chicago and other religious groups criticized this move on grounds that the programs catered to diverse religious audiences in fulfillment of the station's public-service obligations. (Note: Heritage of Faith and Mass for Shut-ins were subsequently acquired by WGBO-TV under an agreement that allowed them to continue to be produced at WGN-TV's studios.) The Sunday edition was discontinued after the September 4, 1994, broadcast; the Saturday edition followed suit on December 19, 1998; news director Steve Ramsey cited the need to provide more resources for weekday morning newscasts. Weekend morning newscasts returned on October 2, 2010, with the debut of hour-long editions at 6 a.m. that shifted to a two-hour block at 7 a.m. on September 10, 2016, following WGN-TV's disaffiliation from The CW, and expanded to a third hour on Saturdays until 10 a.m. on January 11, 2020.

Morning news programming was extended to weekdays on September 6, 1994, with the WGN Morning News debuting from 7 to 8 a.m.; it was originally anchored by Dave Eckert, Sonja Gantt, and meteorologist Paul Huttner. To improve viewership, the program—which replaced children's programs that had previously aired at that time—was soon reformatted to feature a mix of straight news and entertainment, and lifestyle features, in a looser style similar to that of morning radio programs. This reformatting helped Morning News to eventually begin out-competing local and national morning news programs—including its closest initial competitor, WFLD's Fox Thing in the Morning (now Good Day Chicago)—in the 25–54 age demographic and in total viewers. The program was expanded to two hours, extending until 9 a.m., on January 8, 1996, with a later hour-long expansion [to 10 a.m.] on September 3, 2013. An hour-long 6 a.m. Early Edition of the newscast debuted on August 5, 1996; this newscast gradually expanded to three hours, beginning with the addition of a 5:30 a.m. half-hour in January 2001 and ending with its July 11, 2011, extension to 4 a.m. WGN Morning News became the first WGN-TV newscast to be denied clearance on the national feed in September 1996, due to self-imposed exclusivity restrictions concerning paid segments and rate charges the station's sales department would have to pay if the segments aired nationally. Simulcasts of the WGN Morning News temporarily returned to WGN America on February 3, 2014, when it began airing the 4 a.m. hour.

In July 1996, WGN-TV began using a Eurocopter AS350 B2 helicopter for news gathering; the aircraft was known as "Skycam 9", and was used for breaking news events and traffic reporting. In October 1999, freelance reporter Jane Boal made headlines when she was hit from behind by a car; (Note: The accident occurred during a live midday report about a carbon monoxide leak that forced the evacuation of a school in the Rogers Park neighborhood.) Boal (Note: Boal was laid off by the station in May 2009.) suffered cartilage and ligament injuries to both of her legs after being pinned between the car involved in the accident and a WGN live truck, but was able to resume work in early November. In 2000, WGN-TV constructed a new 26,000-square-foot (2,415 m^{2}) newsroom covering two floors on the eastern portion of its studio facility, increasing the building's size to approximately 131,000 square feet (12,170 m^{2}). The original newsroom was renovated for use by the station's weather department.

In April 2008, WGN-TV persuaded veteran WMAQ-TV and WFLD anchor Mark Suppelsa—who turned down a contract with the latter station due to a proposed salary cut—to take over as lead anchor of the 9 p.m. newscast, replacing Steve Sanders. (Note: Sanders was moved to the midday newscast and was joined in September 2009 by his former co-anchor on the 9 p.m. broadcast from 1993 until Suppelsa's appointment, Allison Payne, after Micah Materre moved to the prime time newscasts full-time.) Suppelsa co-anchored the weeknight newscasts until his retirement from broadcasting in December 2017, and was replaced two months later by Joe Donlon, who served a similar role at KGW in Portland, Oregon. (Note: Donlon departed WGN-TV in June 2020 to become main co-anchor of sister network WGN America's fledgling prime time newscast NewsNation.) On July 19, 2008, beginning with that night's edition of the 9 p.m. newscast, WGN-TV became the third television station in Chicago to broadcast local newscasts in high definition. Video from remote and field equipment was initially broadcast in 480p standard definition following the transition; HD cameras began to be used for field reports in July 2010, making WGN-TV the first station in the city to broadcast all locally originated news content in HD.

Starting under the direction of news director Greg Caputo, WGN-TV expanded its news programming and launched an early-evening newscast on September 15, 2008, WGN Evening News, which began as a half-hour weeknight broadcast at 5:30 p.m. The newscast expanded to one hour, starting at 5 p.m., on October 5, 2009, and Saturday and Sunday editions were added on July 12, 2014. The weekday editions of the newscast were later expanded to a second hour starting at 4 p.m. on September 8, 2014, and then to three hours on April 4, 2017. (Note: The superstation feed did not clear any of the expanded newscasts up until the conversion of WGN America into a conventional cable channel.) In 2009, WGN-TV began streaming its weekday midday and 5 p.m. newscasts live on its website. On February 22, 2010, WGN-TV became the first television station in Chicago to allow iPhone users to watch live streams of its newscasts; the 6-to-9 a.m. block of the WGN Morning News, the midday, and 5 p.m. newscasts were initially available for streaming to iPhone users. (Note: As of December 2025, all newscasts are streamed through the station's website and on Apple devices, though sports segments are presented only with sound due to streaming restrictions on sports highlights imposed by the major sports leagues.)

On October 5, 2015, the station restored a 10 p.m. newscast—originally airing Monday through Friday—after a 35-year absence; weekend editions of the 10 p.m. broadcast were added on January 11, 2020. A secondary, live, sports-news show, GN Sports, premiered on January 28, 2020, as the lead-out program for the weeknight 10 p.m. newscasts. GN Sports was originally co-hosted by Dan Roan and Jarrett Payton, and focuses on sports news and highlights, feature segments and in-studio interviews in a format similar to Instant Replay, and sports gaming and fantasy sports analysis. (Note: Payton formerly co-hosted the similar CLTV program Sports Feed—alongside WGN sports reporter Josh Frydman, who serves as a GN Sports contributor—from 2015 until Nexstar shut down the cable news channel in December 2019.) Weekend editions of GN Sports were added on August 14, 2021, with the Sunday broadcast replacing the cuisine-and-tourism program Chicago's Best, which had aired on WGN-TV from January 2011 until August 8, 2021.

=== Notable on-air staff ===
Current staff

- Jackie Bange – weekend evening anchor
- Lourdes Duarte – weekday afternoon anchor
- Tim Joyce – weekend morning meteorologist
- Dan Ponce – weekday morning anchor

Former staff

- Fran Allison
- Mike Barz
- Brigid Bazlen
- Bob Bell
- Steve Bell
- Lou Boudreau
- Thom Brennaman
- Jack Brickhouse
- Marshall Brodien
- Lorn Brown
- Roy Brown
- Cheryl Burton
- Chip Caray
- Harry Caray
- Susan Carlson
- Bob Collins
- Bob Costas
- Joey D'Auria
- Merri Dee
- Phil Donahue
- Mike Douglas
- John Drury
- Jim Durham
- Judie Garcia
- Milo Hamilton
- Pat Harvey
- Frances Horwich
- Bill Jackson
- Bob Jordan
- Johnny "Red" Kerr
- Rich King
- Wayne Larrivee
- Roy Leonard
- Paul M. Lisnek
- Vince Lloyd
- Ned Locke
- Nancy Loo
- Jim Lounsbury
- Joe McConnell
- Elaine Mulqueen
- Steve Novak
- Allison Payne
- Lloyd Pettit
- Jimmy Piersall
- Ray Rayner
- Dean Richards
- Ron Rivera
- Randy Salerno
- Don Sandburg
- John Schubeck
- Tom Skilling
- Wendell Smith
- Mark Suppelsa
- Chuck Swirsky
- Jack Taylor
- Roseanne Tellez
- Frazier Thomas
- Bob Trendler
- Robert Urich
- Harry Volkman
- Jenniffer Weigel
- Jim Williams
- Bill Weir

== Technical information ==
=== Subchannels ===
WGN-TV is broadcast from atop the Willis Tower. The station's signal is multiplexed:

Subchannels of WGN-TV
| Subchannel | Res. | Short name | Programming |
|---|---|---|---|
| 9.1 | 1080i | WGN CW | The CW |
| 9.2 | 480i | ANTENNA | Antenna TV (4:3) |
| 9.3 | 480i | GRIT | Grit |
| 9.4 | 480i | REWIND | Rewind TV |
| 9.5 | 480i | TheNest | The Nest |
| 2.1 | 1080i | CBS2-HD | CBS (WBBM-TV) |

Broadcast on behalf of another station

The main 2.1 subchannel of WBBM-TV is also broadcast on the WGN-TV multiplex; WBBM-TV, Chicago's high-power ATSC 3.0 (NextGen TV) station, carries WGN-TV in that format.

=== Analog-to-digital transition ===
WGN-TV began transmitting a digital television signal on UHF channel 19 on January 4, 2001, using a transmitter located 1,486 feet (453 m) atop Sears Tower. (Note: WGN-TV was one of six, originally eight, Chicago television stations that declined offers to move their analog transmitters to the Sears Tower antenna farm ahead of the building's 1973 completion.) The station shut down its analog signal on VHF channel 9, on June 12, 2009, the official date on which full-power television stations in the U.S. were mandated by a federal mandate to cease analog broadcasts. The WGN-TV digital signal continued to broadcast on its pre-transition frequency, UHF channel 19, and digital television receivers continued to display WGN-TV's virtual channel as channel 9. At this date, WGN-TV permanently ceased transmissions from the John Hancock Center's west antenna tower, establishing its digital facilities at Sears Tower as its main transmitter.

Though not a participant in the SAFER Act, WWME-CA carried simulcasts of WGN-TV's 9 p.m. newscast—except in the event of sports delays—and WMAQ-TV's morning and early evening newscasts until July 12 to provide an analog signal for viewers who were unprepared for, or who had reception issues following, the digital transition.

== Canadian distribution ==
In April 1985, the Canadian Radio-television and Telecommunications Commission (CRTC) approved eligibility for the signals of WGN-TV—and fellow American superstations WTBS, WOR-TV, and WPIX—to be retransmitted as foreign services by multichannel television providers in Canada. Under CRTC linkage rules, first implemented in 1983, that require providers to offer U.S.-based program services in discretionary tiers tied to Canadian services, WGN-TV, WGN America, and other authorized U.S. superstations typically have been sold to prospective subscribers of domestic premium services—such as Crave, Starz, Super Channel, Super Écran, and Western Canada-based regional pay services Movie Central and Encore Avenue. Some providers, however, choose to offer WGN in a specialty tier under a related rule that allows for an eligible superstation of the provider's choice to be carried on a non-premium tier. (Note: Denver-based station KWGN-TV has also been authorized for carriage by the CRTC since that point but is not carried on any multichannel television providers in Canada.)

After United Video began offering a separate national feed of WGN upon the U.S. implementation of the Syndex rules in January 1990, most Canadian cable providers began to replace the Chicago signal with the superstation feed. (Note: Among Canadian satellite providers, Star Choice [now Shaw Direct] began carrying the national feed upon the satellite provider's 1994 launch; Bell ExpressVu [now Bell Satellite TV] began distributing the Chicago-area signal when it commenced operations in 1996.) As a network affiliate, WGN-TV provided WB and CW programs to areas of Canada distant from the Canadian–U.S. border that could not receive over-the-air signals of other WB/CW affiliates from American cities. The WGN local feed was subjected to fewer sports blackouts than WGN America had before the separation of the national and local feeds; blackouts of programming to which Canadian broadcasters hold domestic rights apply only to imported U.S.-based specialty channels. Simultaneous substitution rules have applied to certain CW programs that were also carried by Canada-based terrestrial networks. The WGN-TV feed had also previously been available as part of the NHL Centre Ice sports package, primarily for simulcasts of Chicago Blackhawks games that WGN-TV aired until the 2018–19 season.

On January 17, 2007, WGN's main Canadian uplink carrier Shaw Broadcast Services switched its distributed feed of the station to the Chicago signal due to increased licensing fees for the then-superstation feed; despite this, some providers continued to carry the superstation feed in place of, or together with, the Chicago signal, resulting in the duplication of CW network and many syndicated programs that are available in Canada on other U.S. networks. While the CRTC had approved the Chicago station's broadcast signal and its national cable feed for carriage on any domestic multichannel television provider, because of the conversion of WGN America from a superstation into an independent general-entertainment service and its resulting programming separation from WGN-TV, on December 15, 2014, Tribune Broadcasting sent notice it would terminate all Canadian distribution rights for WGN America, effective January 1, 2015. The move was likely done to comply with CRTC genre protection rules that prohibited the use of general entertainment programming formats by domestic or foreign cable channels. The WGN-TV Chicago feed, however, remains authorized for domestic distribution as a superstation. It is carried on Bell Satellite TV channel 1232 across Canada.

== See also ==
- List of three-letter broadcast call signs in the United States
