= Lourdes Duarte =

American television journalist

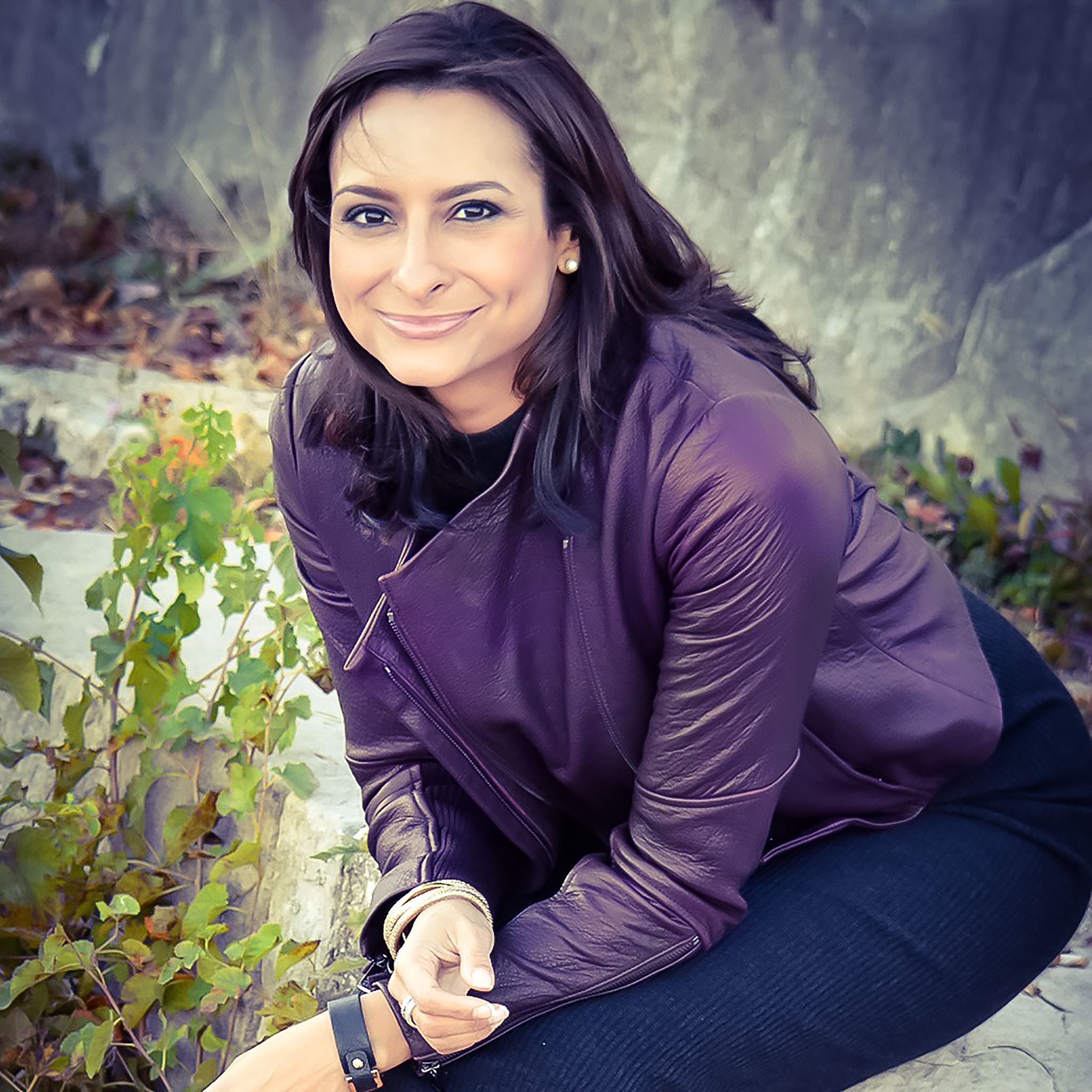
- Duarte in 2015
- Born: 1976 (age 49–50); Chicago, IL
- Education: DePaul University
- Occupations: Co-anchor, WGN Evening News
- Years active: present

Lourdes Duarte is an American television journalist for WGN-TV, where she is an investigative reporter and co-host of the WGN Evening News at 4pm.

== Early life and education ==
Duarte was born and raised in Chicago, Illinois, to Cuban parents. Growing up, she also lived in Puerto Rico and Florida. She graduated from DePaul University with a bachelor of arts in communications.

== Career ==
Duarte started out as a freelance reporter for Spanish television network Telemundo in Chicago, before moving on to Metro Networks radio stations WLRN-FM and WTMI-FM in Miami. She then held television news jobs at WHOI-TV in Peoria, WXIN-TV in Indianapolis and WJBK-TV in Detroit. While in Indianapolis, she launched and hosted the station's public affairs program, Hoy en Dia, which aired monthly on WTTV. The show covered community issues and events, and was at the time the only local Spanish programming.

Duarte joined WGN-TV in 2007 as a general assignment reporter. In 2009, she began anchoring WGN-TV's weekday newscast WGN News at Five with Mark Suppelsa, as well as hosting WGN's biweekly public affairs show Adelante Chicago. In November 2012, in addition to her main job as anchor of WGN News at Five, she began delivering news briefs in Spanish on weekday afternoons on WLEY-FM, a Spanish station known as La Ley, alongside midday show host Martin Omar Novela. In August 2014, Duarte moved from afternoons to mornings, becoming co-host of WGN Morning News, alongside Dan Ponce. According to media blogger Robert Feder, the new pairing of anchors led to the station's biggest ratings boost in that time slot. In 2014, as a celebration of their Latin roots, Duarte, Ponce, and reporter Ana Beleval starred in telenovela parody series Noticias de mi Corazon, with short episodes appearing on WGN.

== Personal life ==
Duarte became engaged to Chicago Mayor Rahm Emanuel's press secretary, Matt McGrath in February 2019. Duarte announced that she was pregnant in an episode of Noticias de mi Corazon in June 2019. Duarte and McGrath welcomed their baby girl in August 2019.

== Awards ==
Duarte has won four Chicago / Midwest Emmy Awards for general assignment and investigative reporting. She won her first Emmy Award for Hoy en Dia, the public affairs program in Spanish that she launched and hosted in Indianapolis, and won a Society of Professional Journalists Award for Minority Issues Reporting for her work on the show. She also won Emmy Awards for her work on Adelante Chicago, and for Outstanding Achievement for News Specialty Report/Series – Human Interest, as a reporter on the WGN segment "Angel of Lower Wacker Drive" in 2014.
