= Steve Novak (director) =

American television director and producer (born 1955)

Steven Floyd Novak (born September 16, 1955) is an American television director and producer.

He works at WGN-TV in Chicago. Some highlights of Novak's career include two Emmy Awards, Stories of Hope: Facing Breast Cancer and overall directing of live and live-to-tape programming, and a Telly Award for WGN:Classics Bozo, Gar and Ray. Novak is the president of the Chicago/Midwest chapter of the National Academy of Television Arts and Sciences (NATAS).

== Early life and education ==
Novak was born September 16, 1955, in Chicago, Illinois. He grew up in Chicago's Rogers Park neighborhood, and graduated from Sullivan High School in 1973.

He attended Northeastern Illinois University in Chicago from 1973 to 1976, graduating with a degree in speech and performing arts with an emphasis in mass communication, and a minor in history (pop. culture).

== Career ==
Novak began his career in the media industry at WGN in 1976 as a radio logger, keeping track of the times that commercials aired during WGN AM radio broadcasts. In 1977, he was promoted to a film librarian, managing all content that WGN had the rights to. In 1978, he went on to program schooling and screened various episodes of shows that aired on WGN. The year after, he became an assistant director in WGN's production department working on news and sports.

In 1984, Novak left WGN to work as a director at Telemation Productions, working on tele-conferencing, commercial productions, and corporate video. While at Telemation he won three Huston International Film Awards, and a number of Telly Awards for writing.

In 1993, Novak returned to WGN-TV where he became a director of the Nine O’Clock News, and the Bozo Show, a WGN-TV children's show. While at WGN, Novak worked on coverage of the Chicago Bulls, the Chicago Cubs, the Chicago White Sox, and the Chicago Blackhawks, as well as many television specials, including the Chicago Auto Show, 4 July, and New Year's coverages. He produced and directed many of the championship rallies for winning Chicago sports teams, such as the White Sox 2004 victory, and the Blackhawks 2011, 2013 and 2015 wins. He won two Emmys, one for Stories of Hope: Facing Breast Cancer and one for overall directing of live and live-to-tape programming, and a Telly Award for WGN:Classics Bozo, Gar and Ray.

In 2003, he joined the National Academy of Television Arts and Sciences and has been on its board of governors ever since. In 2015, he was elected president of the NATAS's Chicago/Midwest chapter to finish the term of the previous president who stepped down.
