= Sullivan High School (Chicago) =

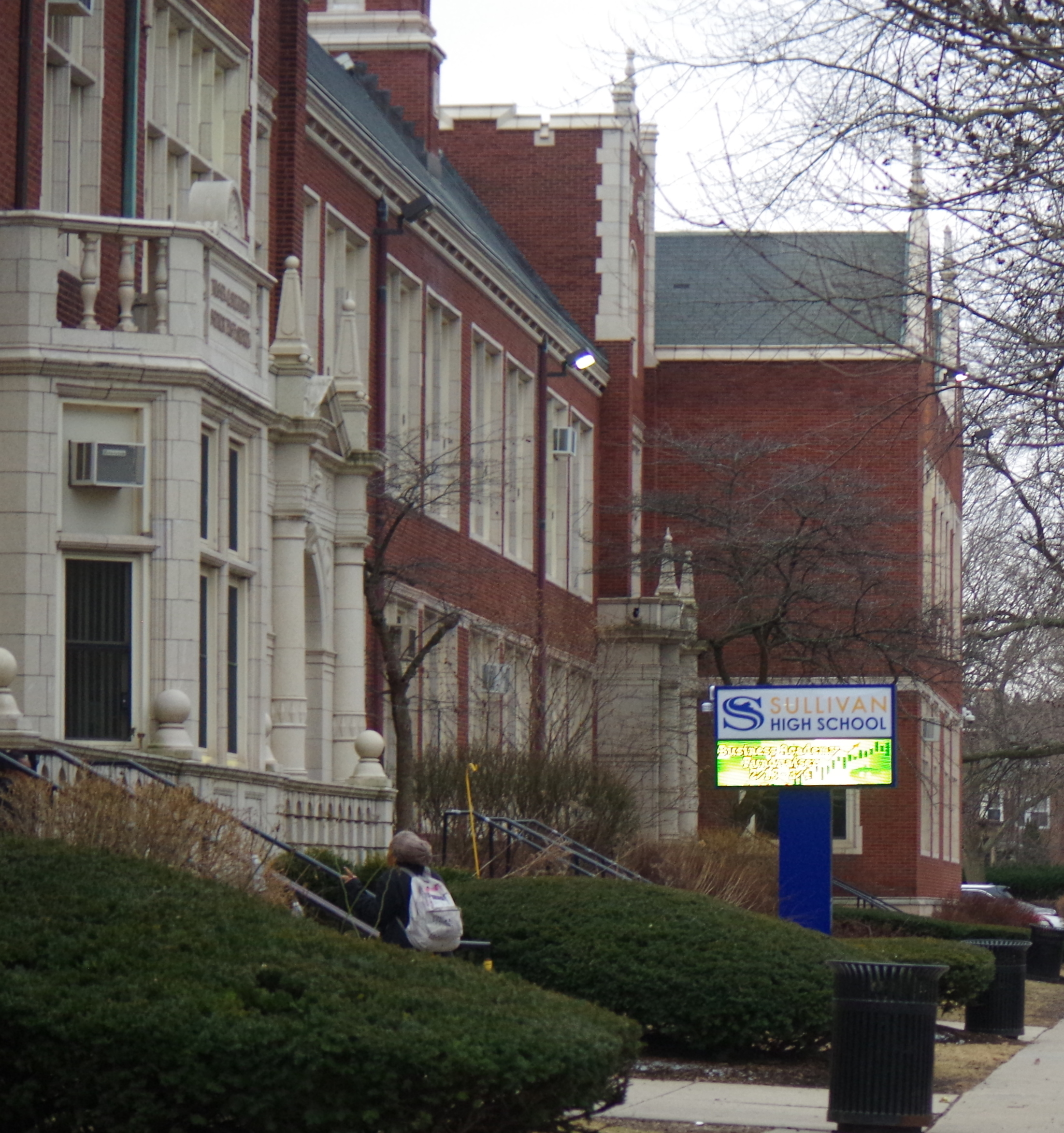

Location
- 6631 N. Bosworth Avenue; Chicago, Illinois 60626; United States; 42.0028°N 87.6689°W

Information
- School type: Public secondary
- Opened: 1923
- School district: Chicago Public Schools
- CEEB code: 141310
- Principal: Chad H. Adams
- Gender: Coed
- Enrollment: 731 (2017-18)
- Campus type: Urban
- Colors: Navy Blue; Gold
- Athletics conference: Chicago Public League
- Team name: Tigers
- Accreditation: North Central Association of Colleges and Schools
- Newspaper: Sentinel
- Yearbook: Navillus
- Website: sullivanhs.org

Sullivan High School is a public four-year high school located in the Rogers Park neighborhood on the north side of Chicago, Illinois, United States. Sullivan is a part of the Chicago Public Schools district. Opened in 1926, the school is named for businessman and Illinois politician Roger Charles Sullivan.

== History ==
Sullivan opened in 1926 as a junior high school under the Chicago Board of Education's plan creation of junior high schools in Chicago. The school begin serving as a traditional high school when junior high schools in the city were phased out in 1933.

In the 2010s, Sullivan High School has served a large number of refugee students. As of 2017, 45% of students were foreign-born and came from 38 different countries. That same year, the school was designated a "newcomer center" by Chicago Public Schools for its programming for refugee and immigrant students.

== Athletics ==
Sullivan competes in the Chicago Public League (CPL) and is a member of the Illinois High School Association (IHSA). The schools sport teams are nicknamed the Tigers. Sullivan boys' soccer team were regional champions and sectional finalists in 2016 and 2017. Sullivan girls' basketball team were regional champions in 2008–09. The boys' track and field became public league champions in 1938–39. In 1978, the school's football team won the Public League championship.

== Notable alumni ==
- Ira Berkow – New York Times sportswriter and author
- Elizabeth Ann Blaesing – illegitimate daughter of President Warren G. Harding
- Sidney Blumenthal – journalist and aide to Bill Clinton
- Hal Bruno – Newsweek correspondent and political director of ABC News; served as moderator for 1992's vice-presidential debate
- Bobby Dixon - Euroleague basketball player
- Richard Alan Greenberg - Oscar-nominated special effects designer
- Shecky Greene – comedian and actor
- Robert Spencer Long – president of Shimer College
- Dick Marx – jazz pianist, arranger, and composer, best known for writing commercial jingles for Kellogg's Raisin Bran and Ken-L Ration dog food; scored the film A League of Their Own; his son is musician Richard Marx
- Clayton Moore – actor, best known for his portrayal of The Lone Ranger
- Danny Newman – publicist and author who worked for Jimmy Durante, Milton Berle, the New York Philharmonic, and the Lyric Opera of Chicago; pioneered the idea of subscription sales
- Cliff Norton – radio announcer and character actor on television and in films
- Steve Novak – television director and producer
- Art Paul – former Playboy Art Director and designer of its rabbit-head logo
- Charles H. Percy – U.S. Senator
- Dewey Robinson – Major League Baseball pitcher (1979–81), playing his entire career for the Chicago White Sox; currently a minor league coach
- Jan Schakowsky – United States Representative for Illinois's 9th congressional district (1999–present)
- Ruth Weiss - poet and filmmaker
- Haskell Wexler – two–time Oscar-winning cinematographer (Who's Afraid of Virginia Woolf?, Bound for Glory)
