= Jack Taylor (journalist) =

American broadcaster (1928–2023)

John Alfred Taylor (December 1928 – February 3, 2023) was an American broadcaster who was the host of The Jack Taylor Show on 1220 WKRS Radio in the Chicago area.

His career in broadcasting began in the Armed Forces Radio, then took him to WINN in Louisville, Kentucky, and in 1950, to WCFL in Chicago. He moved to WBBM Radio Chicago in 1954, and then to his broadcast home for many years, WGN-TV, Chicago in 1958.

Taylor was an anchor, host, and announcer on WGN-TV, and became a financial news anchor, commentator and interviewer for many years on “The Stock Market Observer” on Chicago's WCIU-TV channel 26. He moved to WebFN, a 24-hour financial news network, before eventually returning to radio.

In 2001, Taylor was inducted into the TV Academy's Silver Circle.

Taylor co-hosted the Jack and Virginia Taylor radio show with his wife, Virginia, until her death in 2009. Taylor's daughter, Amy, also works in radio, broadcasting from Milwaukee, Wisconsin.

For ten years, Taylor produced a two-minute op-ed segment on WDCB's "Midwest Ballroom." Taylor retired the segment in early 2022, not long before John "Radio" Russell's "Midwest Ballroom" ended its own 21-year run when Mr. Russell retired.

On 3 February 2023, Taylor died of heart failure in Mequon, Wisconsin at the age of 94.
