= Pat Harvey =

American Journalist

- Born: November 13, 1955 (age 70); Detroit, Michigan, U.S.
- Occupations: News anchor, journalist
- Employers: CBS News; KCBS-TV/KCAL-TV, Los Angeles
- Known for: CBS LA at 5, 6 & 11 PM; CBS LA at 9 PM on KCAL 9
- Awards: LA Area Governor's Award, ATAS, Emmy; L.A. Press Club, RTNA Lifetime Achievement Award, AWRT Genii Award, NABJ Hall of Fame

Pat Harvey (born November 13, 1955) is an American broadcast journalist. She joined KCAL 9 in Los Angeles in 1989, and in 2010 began co-anchoring for KCAL sister station KCBS news at 5, 6 & 11 PM. She is the longest-running anchor in prime time at one station in Los Angeles. For her 20th anniversary, the city of Los Angeles and Los Angeles County Board of Supervisors declared October 30, 2009, Pat Harvey Day. In June 2015 Harvey received the LA Area Emmy's Governor's Award. In 2012, Harvey was inducted into the National Association of Black Journalists Hall of Fame at the Newseum in Washington, D.C.

== Education ==
Harvey attended Cass Technical High School in Detroit, Michigan and the University of Detroit Mercy.

== Early career ==
She also is an original CNN Headline News anchor, joining the start-up network in 1982. She later anchored CNN's morning news program until 1985, interviewing Ferdinand Marcos following the historic democratic elections in the Philippines.

The Detroit native's first news job was in Saginaw, Michigan at then-NBC affiliate, WNEM-TV.

Harvey worked in Chicago at WGN Superstation before coming to Los Angeles. Her investigative reports on faulty pap smear tests, which led to thousands of deaths among women, resulted in legislation regulating cytology labs in Illinois and the closure of one in Southern California. She was also awarded the Peter Lisagor award from the Chicago Headline Club. While working for WGN, she also broke a national story from the Democratic National Convention in Atlanta in 1988, revealing a change in leadership in the Democratic National Committee.

== Career ==
Prior to Harvey's arrival in Los Angeles, the market had only had two Black weeknight news anchors, Ken Jones in the early to mid-1970s and Felicia Jeter from 1980 to 1981. Because of her stellar work, Harvey became a pioneer. She laid the groundwork for lead weekday/night anchors in Los Angeles such as Marc Brown, Christine Devine, and Michaela Pereira.

In addition to her anchoring duties, Harvey has traveled extensively for KCAL News and its sister station CBS Los Angeles, covering stories from the Papal Conclave in Rome, the first all-race elections in South Africa, the AIDS epidemic in East Africa and Russia and the civil war in El Salvador. During the O.J. Simpson trial, Harvey was the first journalist to interview dismissed juror Jeanette Harris. The report was carried on television stations throughout the country and was seen worldwide.

Because of her popularity and community service, Harvey was asked to carry the Olympic torch through downtown Los Angeles in 2002 and received two honorary doctorate degrees in the humanities.

She has won 25 local Emmy awards, a national Emmy and received the Joseph M. Quinn Lifetime Achievement Award from the L.A. Press Club in 2004. Named "Best News Anchor" by the Associated Press. In 2008, Harvey received the Genii award from the Los Angeles chapter of American Women in Radio and Television and has been recognized by the National Association of Black Journalists.

In 2006, Harvey and four other TV anchorwomen formed the Good News Foundation. The group built a computer lab for homeless children on Skid Row, a park and recreation center in South LA, and a library for homeless women at the Downtown Women's Center, in addition to an annual college scholarship for aspiring female journalists.

On February 21, 2017, Harvey was a guest co-host on the CBS daytime show The Talk. It was her eleventh appearance.
