= Jackie Bange =

American journalist

Jackie Bange is the weekend anchor and reporter for independent station WGN-TV in Chicago, Illinois. Bange has co-anchored the weekend edition of the station's primetime newscast WGN News at Nine since October 1995. Bange is married with three children.

== Career ==
Bange is a graduate of the University of Florida, where she received her post-baccalaureate degree in Telecommunications. Bange also has an undergraduate degree from Florida State University in Management Information Systems.

Bange began her career as a noon anchor and reporter for CBS affiliate WPEC-TV in West Palm Beach, Florida. In 1990, she became a general assignment reporter and weekend anchor for NBC owned-and-operated station WMAQ-TV in Chicago. Bange joined WGN-TV in August 1993 as a general assignment reporter, and then was later named co-anchor of the WGN Morning News from January to October 1995 before moving to weekend evenings. In 2009, Bange completed the Olympic length of the Chicago Triathlon.

In addition to coverage of local stories, Bange has done reports from international locations, including Paris and Africa.

== Awards and recognition ==
Bange won a Regional Emmy Award in 1999 for "Best Feature Reporting" for her series on a group of skydivers trying to attain the world record for the largest skydive formation.

In 2005, following the devastating Hurricane Katrina, Bange was assigned a special report called "Into the Darkness," which profiled two Chicago-area pilots and their crew who became among the first to arrive in New Orleans after the storm destroyed the levees surrounding the city and flooded New Orleans and who helped rescue hundreds of stranded residents. Bange recreated the rescue for viewers using night-vision goggles, and the report won an award by the Illinois chapter of the Associated Press for "Best Hard News Feature".

In 2009 Bange won the Peter Lisagor award for hard news and in-depth reporting for a news piece wherein she helped a widow "get justice" for her husband who was killed in a case of suspected drunk driving.
