= Mark Suppelsa =

American retired journalist

Mark Eugene Suppelsa (born June 25, 1962 in Milwaukee, Wisconsin) is a retired television journalist, who worked most notably for nearly a decade as an investigative reporter and anchor for WGN-TV in Chicago, Illinois. Suppelsa co-anchored the WGN Evening News, WGN News at Nine, and WGN News at Ten with Micah Materre. Suppelsa's last broadcast was December 8, 2017.

== Early life and education ==
Born in Milwaukee in 1962, Suppelsa moved with his family to Libertyville, Illinois in 1972, and then to Frankfort, Illinois in 1978. He graduated from Lincoln-Way High School in New Lenox, Illinois in 1980.

In 1984, Suppelsa graduated from Marquette University in Milwaukee with a degree in journalism. While in college, he worked as a disc jockey and newsman for the campus radio station, WMUR, and as a reporter and news anchor for Marquette University television. Recalling one of his first investigative reporting assignments, Suppelsa said, "I enjoyed the story and something just hooked me. The deadlines, the writing, the video, the shooting it, the editing it. It all just swept me away." His on-air work for the station also included play-by-play coverage of Marquette basketball.

During Suppelsa's final year of college, he worked over the holidays at WAOW-TV in Wausau, Wisconsin.

== Professional career ==
Suppelsa's first job after college was at WFRV-TV in Green Bay, Wisconsin, where he became an anchor after six months on the job. In 1987, Suppelsa took a job at KSTP-TV in Minneapolis-Saint Paul, where he worked as an anchor and a reporter.

In July 1993, Suppelsa joined WMAQ-TV in Chicago as a weekend anchor and reporter. He later became a late afternoon and early evening news anchor. In May 1997, Suppelsa memorably sparred with talk-show host Jerry Springer during WMAQ's 10 p.m. newscast. Shortly after, Springer resigned, ending his brief but controversial run as a commentator.

In March 2003, Suppelsa left WMAQ-TV to join WFLD-TV in Chicago as a reporter and fill-in anchor. In September 2004, WFLD promoted Suppelsa to co-anchor of Fox News Chicago at Nine.

In March 2008, Suppelsa chose not to renew his contract with WFLD-TV, reportedly turning down a new contract that would have cut his salary by about 15 percent. Once the 90-day "right to match" clause in his old contract expired, Suppelsa became free to accept a new job in TV. He then signed a contract with WGN-TV to replace Steve Sanders as anchor of the WGN News at Nine

Suppelsa who formerly worked as a morning news anchor on the Eric and Kathy Show on WTMX-FM radio in Chicago, says it was truly one of the most enjoyable highlights of his working time in Chicago (...except for the 4:25am alarm clock each morning.) He said that he quit the radio show in October 2010 after he convinced the station to reposition his investigative producer. He subsequently resigned stating that he had too much to handle in one day's work.

On December 8, 2017, Suppelsa retired from WGN, ending his 39-year career in the news business. He cited his desire to get off the news carousel, and enjoy retirement with his wife.

== Personal ==
Suppelsa met his wife, Candus, while working in Minneapolis in 1988. They have two children and live in Bigfork, Montana.

In May 2012, Suppelsa announced that he would be taking a break from his job at WGN to enter a monthlong alcohol rehabilitation program. He no longer drinks alcohol. Suppelsa is also reported to be a vegetarian.
