= Triskelion (disambiguation) =

A triskelion is a motif consisting of three identical figures emanating from a center.

Triskelion or Triskellion may also refer to:

== Art, entertainment, and media ==
- Triskelion (Marvel Cinematic Universe), the headquarters of S.H.I.E.L.D. in the Marvel Cinematic Universe
- Triskelion – the fictional ternary starlit world depicted in "The Gamesters of Triskelion" episode of the original Star Trek television series
- Triskellion (series) – a series of fictional books written by Mark Billingham and Peter Cocks

== Organizations ==
- Triskelion Arts – a non-profit arts presenting organization which includes two theaters and rehearsal studios in Williamsburg, Brooklyn
- Tau Gamma Phi – a fraternity established in the Philippines whose name is derived from Triskelion Grand Fraternity. Its members call themselves Triskelions

== See also ==
- Trisquel
