= Kevin Lauderdale =

American science fiction author

Kevin Lauderdale is an American science fiction author primarily known for his Star Trek short stories, which began with publication in the Strange New Worlds anthology series. His stories appeared in three successive volumes of the series, making him eligible for a "Wardy," named for fellow Strange New Worlds veteran Dayton Ward.

In addition to his Star Trek work, he has published essays and articles in The Dictionary of American Biography (now known as The Scribner Encyclopedia of American Lives), the Los Angeles Times, Bride Again, Animato!, Pulse!, and McSweeney's Internet Tendency, as well as poetry in Andrei Codrescu's Exquisite Corpse.

He was formerly the writer of "The Kevindex", a book review website, from 1996 to 2001. That site is now down, and only one piece of content is still available online in archived form: "An Annotated Guide to The Two Georges by Richard Dreyfuss and Harry Turtledove."

Born in Los Angeles, California, Lauderdale holds a bachelor's degree in English literature from UCLA and a master's degree in the same field from San Francisco State University, as well as a Master of Library and Information Science degree (also from UCLA). He currently lives in northern Virginia with his wife and two dogs.

== Bibliography ==
=== Star Trek fiction ===
- Strange New Worlds VII (June 2004)
  - "A Test of Character"
- Strange New Worlds 8 (July 2005)
  - "Assignment: One"
- Strange New Worlds 9 (August 2006)
  - "The Rules of War"
- Star Trek: Constellations (September 2006)
  - "Devices and Desires"
- Outside In Boldly Goes (ATB Publishing, November 2016)
  - "Minutes of the Ruling Council of Elysia" (The Star Trek: The Animated Series episode "The Time Trap" considered as an episode of The Vicar of Dibley).

=== Original fiction ===
- "The Skinhead and the Cavalier", Tales from the Canyons of the Damned, No. 36, ed by Daniel Arthur Smith, December 2019.
- "Yard Work", Poets/Artists, “Chronicles of a Future Foretold”, Curated by Dr. Samuel Peralta, August 2018.
  - The story was reprinted by Little Blue Marble, September 2022.
- "James and the Great Pumpkin (Carving Contest)", Tales from the Canyons of the Damned, No. 19, ed. by Daniel Arthur Smith, September 2017.
- "A Personal Account of the Battle of the Eurydice and the Sceptre", Tales from the Canyons of the Damned, No. 18, ed. by Daniel Arthur Smith, August 2017.
- "The Peacemaker", Tales from the Canyons of the Damned in Space, No. 1, ed by Daniel Arthur Smith, December 2016.
- "Box 27", Nature. 539, 17 November 2016. A story inspired by Carl Sagan's Cosmos: A Personal Voyage
- "Air and Space After Dark", (co-written with Jeff Ayers) Young Adventurers: Heroes, Explorers & Swashbucklers, ed. Austin S. Camacho, Intrigue Publishing (December 2015)
- "Olaf and Lars", A Quiet Shelter There: An Anthology to Benefit Homeless Animals, ed. Gerri Leen, Hadley Rille Books (October 2015)
  - The story was reprinted in the web site Cosmic Roots And Eldritch Shores, January 2018.
  - The story was reprinted in the anthology Paradoxical Pets, ed. James Maxey, Word Balloon Books, November 2022.
- "James and the Prince of Darkness", Ain't Superstitious, ed. Juliana Rew, Third Flatiron Press (August 2015)
  - The story was reprinted in The Devil You Know Best, ed. by R.J. Carter, Critical Blast Publishing, March, 2024.
- "The Flatboat", Lissette's Tales of the Imagination, issue 6. June 2013
- "Man on the Moon," Daily Flash 2012: 366 Days of Flash Fiction, ed. Jessy Marie Roberts, Pill Hill Press (2011)
- "America's! Next!! Zombie!!!", Zombies Ain't Funny, ed. Greg Crites, Veinarmor (June 2011)
- "James and the Gentry", Twit Publishing Presents: PULP!: Summer/Fall 2011 (Volume 3), ed. Chris Gabrysch, Twit Publishing (June 2011)
  - The story was reprinted in Tales from the Canyons of the Damned, No. 13, ed by Daniel Arthur Smith, February 2017.
- "James and the Dark Grimoire", Cthulhu Unbound, ed. John Sunseri and Thom Brannan, Permuted Press (March 2009).
  - This story was released as a full-cast audio drama on episode 93 of The Chronic Rift podcast on August 5, 2010.
  - In August 2010 the story was nominated for the WSFA Small Press Award by the Washington Science Fiction Association.
  - This story made Ellen Datlow's honorable mention list for Best Horror published in 2009.
  - The story was reprinted in Tales from the Canyons of the Damned, No. 6, ed by Daniel Arthur Smith, July 2016.
  - The story was reprinted in Necronomi-RomCom, ed by Gevera Piedmont, July 2024.
- "The Laughing C'rell", Neo-Opsis, issue 15. September 2008.

=== Non-fiction ===
- "'Penny Lane' by the Beatles," McSweeneys Internet Tendency: Short Essays on Favorite Songs, Inspired by Nick Hornby's Songbook, (May 23, 2005)
- "Vincent Price," Scribner Encyclopedia of American Lives. Volume 3 (Jackson, Markoe, and Markoe, eds), New York: Charles Scribner's Sons, 2001.
- "Mel Blanc," Scribner Encyclopedia of American Lives. Volume 2 (Jackson, Markoe, and Markoe, eds), New York: Charles Scribner's Sons, 1999.
- "A Few New Year's Treat for the VCR," Los Angeles Times, January 2, 1997.
- "Rating the Disney Classics : The Best--and the Rest--of Animated Videos, on a Scale From 1 to 10," Los Angeles Times, July 5, 1996.
- "When the Small Screen Makes It Larger Than Life," Los Angeles Times, June 2, 1996.
- "James M. Cain," Dictionary of American Biography. Supplement 10 (Jackson, Markoe, and Markoe, eds), New York: Simon & Schuster Macmillan, 1995.
- "Capra-free Xmas," Tower Records' Pulse! magazine (December 1994)
- "Star Trek: The Animated Series: A Second Look,"Animato! magazine (Summer 1994)

== Podcasts ==
Lauderdale hosted a monthly pop culture podcast on The Chronic Rift network titled “It Has Come to My Attention.” He now hosts a podcast devoted to the Golden Age of Radio called "Presenting the Transcription Feature" and co-hosts a bad movie podcast, "Mighty Movie's Temple of Bad."

Podcasts:

- Crockett Johnson's 1940s comic strip Barnaby June 2013
- Darl Larsen's annotated guide to Monty Python's Flying Circus January 2013
- Children's books for Christmas November 2012
- Children's books for Halloween October 2012
- The Malaysian cartoonist Lat July 2012
- The Beatles' animated film Yellow Submarine June 2012
- The many incarnations of Judge Dee, especially in Detective Dee and the Mystery of the Phantom Flame May 2012
- Sit-com humor April 2012
- Isaac Asimov's autobiographies March, 2012
- The film version of The Rocketeer February, 2012
- The Mote in God’s Eye, the Aubrey-Maturin books of Patrick O’Brian, and Star Trek January, 2012
- Tintin December, 2011
- The Cinnamon Bear November, 2011
- Ray Bradbury October, 2011
- Tom Angleberger's Origami Yoda books September, 2011
- Patrick Rothfuss, author of the two volumes of The Kingkiller Chronicle series August, 2011
- Sherlock Holmes graphic novels July, 2011
- The film version of The Man Who Would Be King June, 2011
