= Don't Quit =

Don't Quit may refer to:

- Don't Quit (poem), a poem by Edgar A. Guest
- "Don't Quit" (song), a song by DJ Khaled and Calvin Harris
