= The Time Trap =

- Star Trek: The Animated Series episode
- Episode no.: Season 1 Episode 12
- Directed by: Hal Sutherland
- Written by: Joyce Perry
- Production code: 22010
- Original air date: November 24, 1973

Episode chronology
← Previous "The Terratin Incident"	Next → "The Ambergris Element"

"The Time Trap" is the twelfth episode of the first season of the American animated science fiction television series Star Trek: The Animated Series. It first aired in the NBC Saturday morning lineup on November 24, 1973, and was written by American actress and screenwriter Joyce Perry. (Note: This story was expanded into a novelette by science-fiction author Alan Dean Foster as part of the collection, Star Trek Log Four (1975) (ISBN 0-345-24435-4).)

In this episode, Captain Kirk must cooperate with distrusted Klingons to escape a "Sargasso Sea" of dead starships.

The episode introduces the first example of a Starfleet starship other than a Constitution-class ship: the USS Bonaventure, which is said to be the "first ship to have warp drive installed" in the episode. The ship is never referenced in live-action Star Trek, although it is the name of Zefram Cochrane's ship in the non-canonical novel Federation by Judith and Garfield Reeves-Stevens.

== Plot ==
On stardate 5267.2, while exploring the Delta Triangle, where many starships have disappeared, the Federation starship Enterprise is attacked by several Klingon vessels. During the battle they are caught in an ion storm. The Enterprise and one Klingon battlecruiser are drawn into a spacetime vortex and end up in a timeless dimension in what could only be called a graveyard for space vessels. Captain Kirk and his crew are shocked to find "that the descendants of the crews of these various vessels are still alive" and have formed a government, calling themselves 'The Elysian Council.'

The crew discovers that the timewarp will gradually disintegrate the Enterprise's dilithium crystals. Their only means of escape is to link their ship with the Klingons' and their commander Kor (Note: Kor is portrayed in both the Original Series and Deep Space Nine by actor John Colicos but is voiced here by Star Trek regular James Doohan.) and try to power themselves out of the vortex.

== Casting ==
In this episode the character Kor is voiced by actor James Doohan. The actor that usually played Kor, John Colicos, was not available.

== Reception ==
In their book TrekNavigator: The Ultimate Review Guide to the Entire Trek Saga, Mark A. Altman and Ed Gross commented that while the "Bermuda Triangle of space" theme is somewhat fanciful, "the resulting cooperation between the Klingons and the Enterprise is adeptly done." However, they judged Nichelle Nichols and James Doohan's work in multiple roles to be unsatisfactory, and found the Klingons' betrayal predictable.

In 2017, Tor.com rated this episode 5 out 10, noting Nichelle Nichols voices three characters and appearance of Klingon characters and spacecraft.

== See also ==
- "The Void" - an episode of Star Trek: Voyager where the heroes' ship is caught in an assumed-inescapable region where resources are drained but escape is possible with cooperation from others.
- Star Trek: Voyager – Elite Force - a 2000 video game based on Voyager and focuses on the starship Voyager being trapped in a starship graveyard.
- "Museum At The End Of Time" - a comic book issue of Star Trek published by Gold Key (Star Trek #15 - August 1972). A nearly-identical plot the year before this episode aired has the U.S.S. Enterprise trapped in Limbo with Klingons. This Limbo is also a timeless dimension with a ship graveyard, but here one lives forever (as one ship and crew are from before the Federation was formed). This Limbo has a chunk of a planet with a museum on it. However, instead of Limbo draining the ship's dilithium crystals, here the Enterprise & Klingon ships' entrance destabilized Limbo and it will soon explode. The Enterprise and the Klingons must work together to escape by combining their lasers at a central spot to create a hole and escape. No author is mentioned in the comic. The Klingon commander is never given a name.
- The episode is spoofed in the anthology Outside In Boldly Goes (ATB Publishing, November 2016) by Kevin Lauderdale's story "Minutes of the Ruling Council of Elysia," which reconsiders it as an episode of The Vicar of Dibley.
