= The Lorelei Signal =

- Star Trek: The Animated Series episode
- Episode no.: Season 1 Episode 4
- Directed by: Hal Sutherland
- Written by: Margaret Armen
- Production code: 22006
- Original air date: September 29, 1973

Episode chronology
← Previous "One of Our Planets Is Missing"	Next → "More Tribbles, More Troubles"

"The Lorelei Signal" is the fourth episode of the first season of the animated American science fiction television series Star Trek: The Animated Series. It first aired in the NBC Saturday morning lineup on September 29, 1973, and was written by Margaret Armen, (Note: This story was expanded into a novelette by science-fiction author Alan Dean Foster as part of the collection, Star Trek Log Two (1974) (ISBN 0-345-25812-6).) author of three Original Series episodes. (Note: Armen wrote The Original Series episodes "The Gamesters of Triskelion", "The Paradise Syndrome" and "The Cloud Minders" (teleplay only).)

Set in the 23rd century, the series follows the adventures of Captain James T. Kirk (voiced by William Shatner) and the crew of the Federation starship Enterprise. In this episode, Lt. Uhura (voiced by Nichelle Nichols), Nurse Chapel (voiced by Majel Barrett) and the Enterprise women must take charge of the ship from incapacitated male senior officers and rescue Captain Kirk and his landing party held on an alien world.

== Plot ==
The Federation starship Enterprise investigates a sector of space where starships have been disappearing every 27.346 years. A compelling musical signal lures the Enterprise to a remote planet in the Taurean system. The music works on the men of the Enterprise, affecting their judgement and causing them to experience euphoric hallucinations. Captain Kirk, First Officer Spock, Chief Medical Officer Dr. McCoy, and Lieutenant Carver beam down to the source of the signals. The inhabitants are a race of beautiful women who want to celebrate their arrival. As they indulge in the entertainment the women offer, they find themselves in a lethargic state and rapidly aging. Headbands locked around their foreheads transmit their lifeforce to the women, who are growing in strength.

On board the Enterprise, Communications Officer Lt. Uhura talks with Nurse Chapel about the men's condition and concludes that she must take command due to the euphoric state of Chief Engineer Scott.

Kirk and his party gather enough strength to escape to a spacious garden and hide inside a tall urn. They realize the pace of their loss of strength correlates with the proximity of the women. Spock, who has not aged as much due to longer Vulcan longevity, agrees to go back to retrieve their communicators; he tells Uhura to send an all-female rescue party.

Uhura beams down with Chapel and a female security force. When the native women try to force them to leave, they stun them with their phasers. When Uhura threatens to destroy their temple, the Taurean women explain how they came to be in their current situation; when their people settled on the planet, the planet weakened them, and the women could only survive by draining the men's remaining energy, causing their deaths. The women are now immortal and unaging, but cannot reproduce, and every 27 years must lure males and drain their life forces to stay alive. At Uhura's urging, the Taurean women help them locate the male landing party, who are drowning in the urn due to a rainstorm. The female landing party frees them using their phasers.

The aging process is stopped with the removal of the headbands, but they cannot find a treatment to restore their original age. Spock comes up with the idea of using their original transporter patterns from when they first beamed down.

Uhura returns to the planet and witnesses the Taurean leader, Theela, destroying the device that had been luring starships, stating that Uhura should tell Kirk she kept her side of the bargain. Uhura informs them that a ship of women will return to bring them to a habitable world and that the women's bodies should return to normal in a few months. Theela is pleased, preferring a life fully lived to a static immortality.

== Production ==
In addition to her normal role as Nurse Chapel, Majel Barrett supplies the voice of Theela, the head of the Taurean women, Nichelle Nichols supplies the voice of security officer Lt. Davison in addition to that of Lt. Uhura, and James Doohan adds the voice of Lt. Carver to his usual role of Chief Engineer Scott. (Doohan also sings part of an old Welsh folk song, "Yr Hufen Melyn" ("The Yellow Cream") as the Enterprise is seen drifting by the planet, in a segment that lasts over half a minute.)

Co-producer Lou Scheimer recounted that during the table read for the episode, "Nichelle [Nichols] yelled happily, 'What you're kidding? I actually get to run the Enterprise? Really?' It broke the whole room up." This is one of three times a woman commands the Enterprise, the other two being in "The Cage" by Number One, and "Turnabout Intruder" by Dr. Janice Lester.

== Reception ==
Den of Geek listed "The Lorelei Signal" as one of the top 25 episodes from a grouping of TOS and TAS together. The Hollywood Reporter rated "The Lorelei Signal" the 91st best episode of all Star Trek episodes, prior to Star Trek: Discovery. SyFy noted this episode as having Uhura's third best scene in Star Trek. A Star Trek binge-watching guide by Den of Geek recommended this episode as part of the "foundations of Star Trek" group.

== See also ==
- "The Deadly Years" - a second season Star Trek: The Original Series episode where command personnel are subjected to rapid aging.
- "Unnatural Selection" - a second season Star Trek: The Next Generation episode where the transporter is used to reverse rapid aging.
- "Rascals" - a sixth season Star Trek: The Next Generation episode where Enterprise personnel must use the transporter to restore their physical parameters to normal.
- "Favorite Son" - a third season Star Trek: Voyager episode where Ensign Kim finds himself compelled to join an all-female alien society where, he discovers, they need to drain his life-energy to survive.
- "Bound" - a fourth season Star Trek: Enterprise episode where Enterprise command staff are compelled to do the bidding of Orion slave women they have brought on board.
