= The Ambergris Element =

- Star Trek: The Animated Series episode
- Episode no.: Season 1 Episode 13
- Directed by: Hal Sutherland
- Written by: Margaret Armen
- Production code: 22013
- Original air date: December 1, 1973

Episode chronology
← Previous "The Terratin Incident"	Next → "The Slaver Weapon"

"The Ambergris Element" is the thirteenth episode of the first season of the American animated science fiction television series Star Trek: The Animated Series. It first aired in the NBC Saturday morning lineup on December 1, 1973, and was written by Margaret Armen. (Note: This story was expanded into a novelette by science-fiction author Alan Dean Foster as part of the collection, Star Trek Log Five (1975) (ISBN 0-345-33351-9).) who wrote the earlier episode "The Lorelei Signal" and also worked on episodes for The Original Series.

In this episode, Captain Kirk and First Officer Spock are mysteriously transformed into water-breathers.

== Plot ==
On stardate 5499.9, while exploring the planet Argo, which was transformed into a water planet by seismic disturbances, Captain Kirk of the Federation starship Enterprise and his Science Officer Spock are lost from their survey party when their aquashuttle is attacked by a giant sea creature. After a lengthy search, the two are found, mysteriously transformed into water breathers. Chief Medical Officer Dr. McCoy's analysis indicates that this could not have been accomplished by any natural process, leading to the conclusion that intelligent life must still exist on the planet, but under the seas.

In order to return to their normal selves, Kirk and Spock must seek out the intelligent life forms responsible for their transformation. Since the aquashuttle was destroyed when the sea creature attacked them, they swim to search for answers. They encounter a group of Aquans (members of an advanced undersea civilization) who express fear and disgust before swimming away. Kirk and Spock follow them from a distance and are captured as they admire the Aquans’ underwater city. They are taken to a tribune where they are accused of being spies. One council member, Rila, stands up for them, asking that they be given a chance to explain themselves. Unfortunately, the meeting is interrupted by Aquans who report that three air-breathers have invaded the sea foliage. They are referring to Mr. Scott and the rest of the assistance party who moved from their original post to try to inform Kirk and Spock of an impending sea quake. Upon hearing this news, the leader of the council decides that Kirk and Spock are to be brought to the surface and left there to suffocate.

Rila, the sole sympathetic council member, saves their lives by leading the assistance party to them. She then explains the Aquan history that led to their fear of air-breathers, revealing that reverse mutation is possible, but forbidden. Despite the ban, Kirk enlists her help in locating the lost formula for reversing the transformation and capturing a giant sur-snake whose venom is key to the antidote.

== Reception ==
John Peel, writing for the magazine The Star Trek Files, described the episode as "a particularly silly story", citing a story with things done that could not have been done in the live show but without any thought put into it.

As part of his 2017 re-watch series of articles of the show, Keith DeCandido rated this a 5 out of 10, citing the episode's climax as "stultifying".

== Notes ==
As part of budgetary savings, Majel Barrett voiced all of the female voices for this episode, while James Doohan voices several of the Aquans, including the High Tribune, with producer (and Filmation co-founder) Lou Scheimer voicing Lemus, with unknown actors voicing other several characters.
