= Lord Nelson (dog) =

American actor, Old English Sheepdog

- Born: Bridewell's Lord Nelson; April 1, 1961; Los Angeles, U.S.
- Occupations: Actor; film; television
- Years active: 1964–1971

Lord Nelson was an American purebred Old English Sheepdog best remembered for his costarring roles in two popular network situation comedies in the 1960s and early 1970s, as Ladadog in Please Don't Eat the Daisies (1965–1967) and as Nelson the Sheepdog in The Doris Day Show (1968–1971).

== Early life ==
Born and raised in Los Angeles, California, he was the son of Bridewell's Beauty and Cheyenne Sam. His real name was "Bridewell's Lord Nelson".

Trained by his owner, Hal Driscoll, Lord Nelson began his schooling at four months old. According his official biography, he appeared on more than 200 television shows (many of which have not been accounted for), including stints on top-rated programs starring television comedy greats Lucille Ball, Jack Benny, and Red Skelton. It was originally reported that his most famous role was that of the Shaggy Dog in the Walt Disney classic comedy feature directed by Charles Barton, The Shaggy Dog (1959), a fact proven untrue since Lord Nelson was born two years after the film was released.

== Career ==
Lord Nelson's first known television appearance (credited under the name of Horatio Nelson) was in the February 1964 broadcast of the popular CBS medical drama, Dr. Kildare, in "Goodbye, Mr. Jersey" in which he played an injured sheepdog known as "Mr. Jersey". A month later, he made the first of three appearances in the second season of Lucille Ball's The Lucy Show on CBS in "Lucy Is Her Own Lawyer", playing Mr. Mooney's dog, Nelson, who takes the stand in court under cross examination during court proceedings over a complaint filed by Mr. Mooney for excessive barking. Lord Nelson would return in season 3 ("Lucy's Contact Lenses") and season 4 ("Lucy Discovers Wayne Newton") for his second and third appearances on the program. In 1965, Lord Nelson was cast as a regular in the MGM Television sitcom produced for NBC, Please Don't Eat the Daisies. He appeared in 58 installments of the series from 1965 to 1967 as the family dog, Ladadog ("Lad" for short).

During his two seasons on program, Lord Nelson reported to work five days a week to Metro-Goldwyn-Mayer studios in Culver City, California, along with his brother, Lord Beaverbrook, who served as his stand-in. In the fall of 1965, when the program premiered on NBC-TV, the four-year-old television star was reportedly "one of Hollywood's highest paid performers."

As a featured player in the program, his past achievements got him his own canvas director's chair, make-up man, and hairdresser. One of Lord Nelson's frustrations was how to bury a bone in two-inches of prop dirt in the mock backyard of the set on MGM's Stage 23 where programs were filmed.

Then tipping the scales at 104 pounds, the lumbering floppy-eared dog with six-inch bangs ate once a day—usually three pounds of food consisting one pound of raw meat and two pounds of kibble. Extra vitamins and sea kelp were also part of his daily diet.

In January 1966, Lord Nelson appeared as a guest on My Three Sons in "What About Harry?" as a shaggy dog who follows Steve Douglas (played by Fred MacMurray) around the house and doesn't want to leave. The following month, Lord Nelson became the father of a litter of sheepdogs. Two of the pedigreed puppies were given away as part of a nationwide "Win a Ladadog Puppy" drawing sponsored by the NBC. Fifty-five affiliated stations participated in the contest.

In March 1966, Lord Nelson was nominated for his first Patsy Award among a group of seven nominees for outstanding animal actors in a television series for his work in Please Don't Eat the Daisies with winners announced in May at the American Humane Assn.'s 16th Annual Patsy Awards held at the Pantages Theater in Hollywood. Flipper, star of the television series named for him, took the top Patsy Award in the television category. The following April, Lord Nelson was nominated for his second Patsy Award for his work on Please Don't Eat the Daisies but lost to Flipper for the second year in a row.

In 1968, Lord Nelson co-starred opposite Doris Day and Brian Keith in the independent comedy feature produced by Martin Melcher and directed by Howard Morris, With Six You Get Eggroll. Commencing filming in early January, played Day's pet dog, Calico. Seven months later, the movie premiered in August of that year before opening in theaters nationwide. Critics cited Lord Nelson as "one of the big show-stealers" for his onscreen performance.

In May of that year, Lord Nelson was among seven other top animal performers—Clarence, the lion and Judy, the chimp (Daktari), Arnold, the pig (Green Acres), Ben, the bear (Gentle Ben), Higgins, the dog (Petticoat Junction), Junior, the dog (Hondo), and Lassie, the collie (Lassie)—to receive nominations for the annual Patsy Award in television, Lord Nelson's third overall. Arnold won the top honors in the television category that year.

In July 1968, he was added to the regular cast of The Doris Day Show as the family pet, Nelson the Sheepdog, then in production of the first season, to premiere in the fall of that year. He was seen weekly along with series stars Doris Day, Denver Pyle, Fran Ryan, James Hampton, Philip Brown, and Todd Starke. Lord Nelson was featured in the opening credits of the cast during the first two seasons. He appeared in 38 shows overall during the series' first three seasons from September 1968 to January 1971.

In April 1969, Lord Nelson was nominated for two Patsy Awards—his first for outstanding motion picture animal star for With Six You Get Eggroll and his first for outstanding animal television star of the year (from a series)—his fourth Patsy for the same category overall—for The Doris Day Show. Fellow nominees included the Pig (Green Acres), Ben, the bear (Gentle Ben), Clarence, the lion (Daktari), Scruffy, the dog (The Ghost and Mrs. Muir), Shaggy, the dog (Blondie), Timmy, the chimpanzee (The Beverly Hillbillies), and Chipper, the dog (Land of the Giants). Lord Nelson lost both times. Arnold, the pig, from television's Green Acres was awarded the Patsy for "Best Supporting Animal in a Television Series".

Eight months later, in December of that year, Lord Nelson returned to the big and small screens in two productions. The first was his fourth overall opposite Lucille Ball in the episode, "Lucy and the Bogie Affair", of her second starring series for CBS, Here's Lucy. He plays a lost sheep dog who Lucy's kids bring home and name "Bogie" after legendary film actor Humphrey Bogart. Later that month, he was back on the silver screen in a supporting role as Ralph the dog in the feature-length family drama, 80 Steps to Jonah, starring Wayne Newton, Mickey Rooney, and Jo Van Fleet.

The following June 1970, Lord Nelson was recognized for his work in 80 Steps to Jonah when he was nominated for his second Patsy Award–and seventh overall–in the category of outstanding animal motion picture star. Rascal, the racoon, was named the winner for his performance in the Disney movie of the same name. It marked the final time he would be nominated for the award in his career. It marked the final time Lord Nelson would be nominated for the award in his career.

In early July 1971, Lord Nelson was back before the cameras with his trainer Hal Driscoll during a guest appearance on the half-hour syndicated series hosted by Betty White, The Pet Set. In January 1972, he appeared in an uncredited role as Ruben Kincaid's neighbor's dog in "Home Is Where the Heart Was" of the hit musical sitcom series The Partridge Family on ABC.
