= One of Our Planets Is Missing =

- Star Trek: The Animated Series episode
- Episode no.: Season 1 Episode 3
- Directed by: Hal Sutherland
- Written by: Marc Daniels
- Production code: 22007
- Original air date: September 22, 1973

Episode chronology
← Previous "Yesteryear"	Next → "The Lorelei Signal"

"One of Our Planets Is Missing" is the third episode of the first season of the animated American science fiction television series Star Trek: The Animated Series. It first aired in the NBC Saturday morning lineup on September 22, 1973, and was written by veteran Star Trek director Marc Daniels. (Note: This story was expanded into a novelette by science-fiction author Alan Dean Foster as part of the collection, Star Trek Log One (1974) (ISBN 0-345-24014-6).) It was directed by Hal Sutherland.

In this episode, the Enterprise must contend with a massive space cloud that eats planets, now targeting a Federation colony of over 82 million inhabitants.

== Plot ==
The Enterprise encounters a giant cloud that consumes planets that lie in its path. They determine it is heading for Mantilles, home to a Federation colony governed by retired Starfleet officer Robert Wesley. (Note: Commodore Robert Wesley commanded a wargames battlegroup of starships from the USS Lexington in The Original Series episode "The Ultimate Computer".) Captain Kirk contacts Wesley, but he has only enough time and starships to evacuate a tiny fraction of the planet's children.

When phasers have no effect, Kirk takes the Enterprise inside the cloud in an attempt to stop it. Avoiding obstacles and proceeding from one chamber to another, the ship begins to lose power. One chamber contains protrusions consisting of pure anti-matter which Chief Engineer Scott beams aboard in a special container and uses to replenish the warp drive engines. Science Officer Spock discovers that the cloud has a brain. Kirk orders preparations be made to self-destruct the Enterprise in the creature's brain in order to kill it. Seeking an alternative to loss of life, however, he suggests Spock use a Vulcan mind meld to communicate with the entity. Since physical contact with the entity is impossible, the ship's sensors are focused on the electrical impulses of the entity's synapses, translating them into thought in order to accomplish the mind meld. Spock tells it that there is life on the planet it plans to consume and allows it to perceive them through Spock's own eyes. Not wanting to kill other life forms, the cloud entity agrees to leave the Enterprise alone and return to its place of origin.

== Reception ==
The book TrekNavigator called the episode "one of the best [shows] that animated [Trek] spin-off has to offer" and "a highly satisfying episode that nicely encapsulates the Star Trek philosophy." It praised the animation of the space cloud and the strong logic of the climactic mind-meld. Tor.com rated the episode 7 out of 10.
