= The Doris Day Show =

American television sitcom (1968–1973)

- First season DVD cover
- Created by: James Fritzell
- Starring: Doris Day; Denver Pyle; Philip Brown; Todd Starke; James Hampton; Fran Ryan; McLean Stevenson; Rose Marie; John Dehner; Jackie Joseph; Paul Smith; Naomi Stevens; Bernie Kopell; Kaye Ballard; Billy De Wolfe; Peter Lawford
- Music by: William Loose (1968–1969); Jimmie Haskell (1969–1973)
- Country of origin: United States
- No. of seasons: 5
- No. of episodes: 128 (list of episodes)

Production
- Executive producers: Martin Melcher (1968–1969); Terry Melcher (1968–1972); Don Genson (1971); Doris Day (1972–1973)
- Producers: Dick Dorso (1968–1969); Bob Sweeney (1968–1969); Jack Elinson (1969–1971); Norman Paul (1969–1971); Edward H. Feldman (1971–1973)
- Running time: 22–24 minutes
- Production company: Arwin Productions

Original release
- Network: CBS
- Release: September 24, 1968 – March 12, 1973

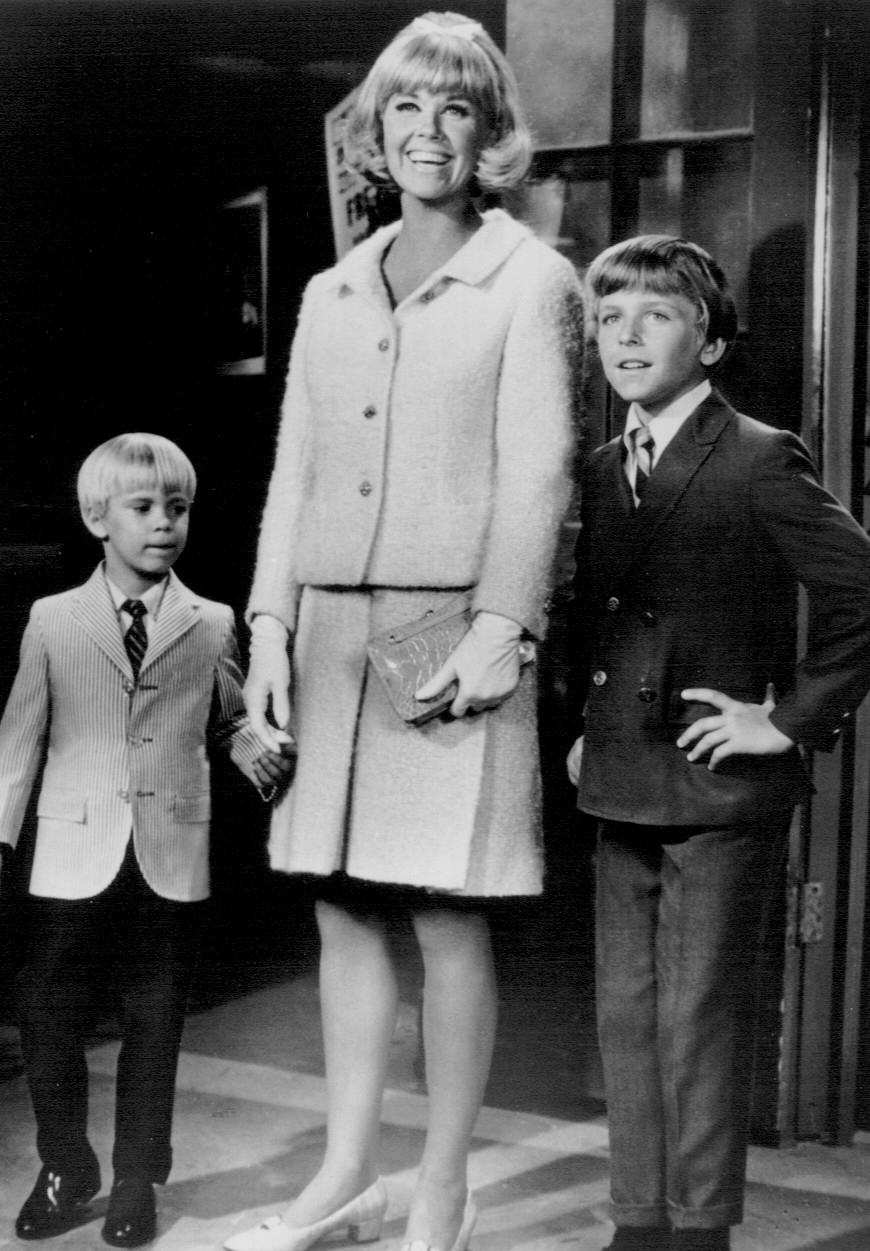
From the first episode (1968) L-R: Todd Starke, Day, and Philip Brown

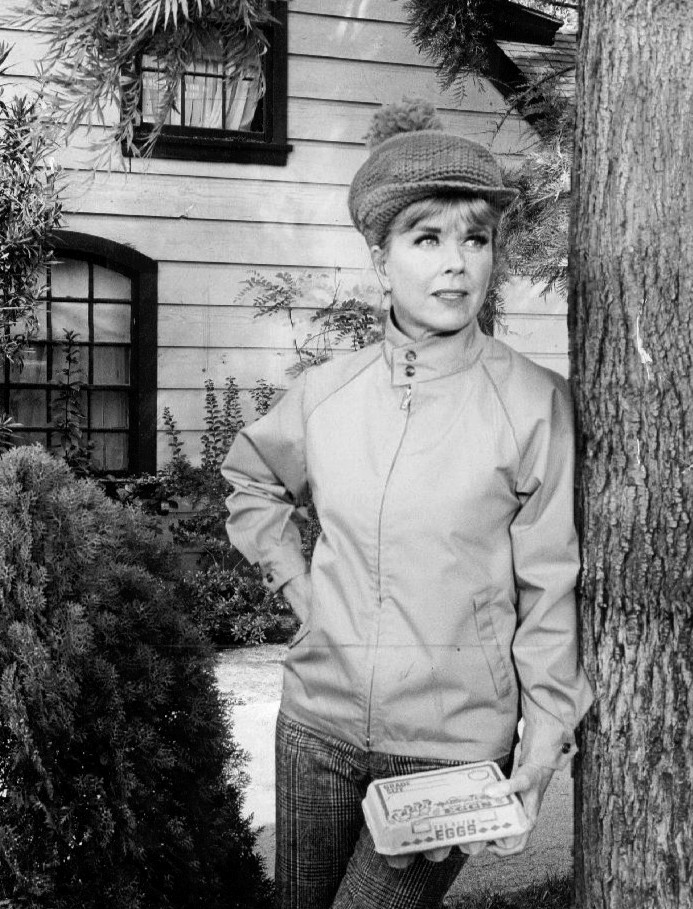
Publicity photo, 1968

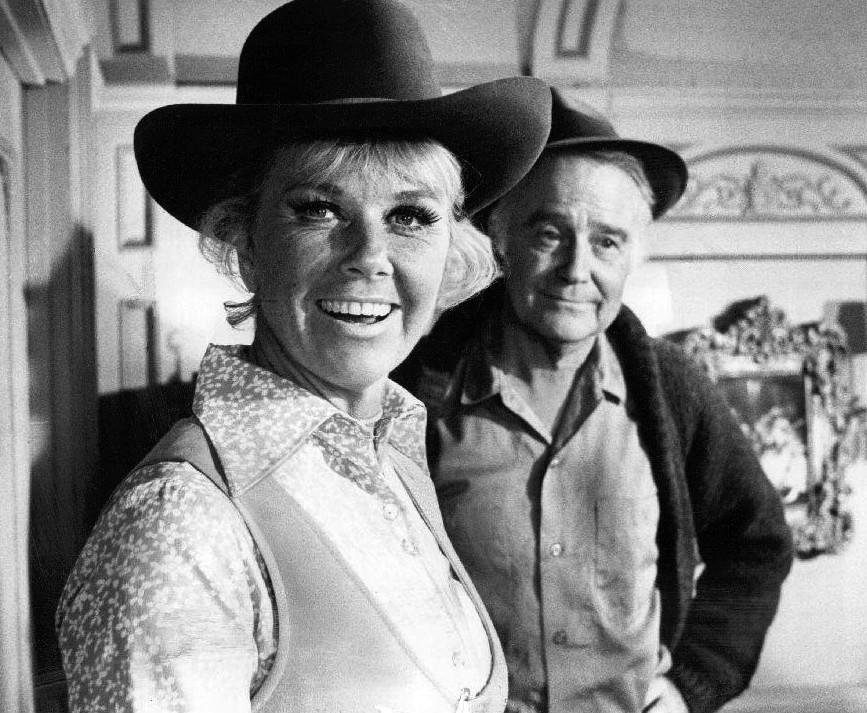
Day with Lew Ayres (Seasons 2–3), 1970

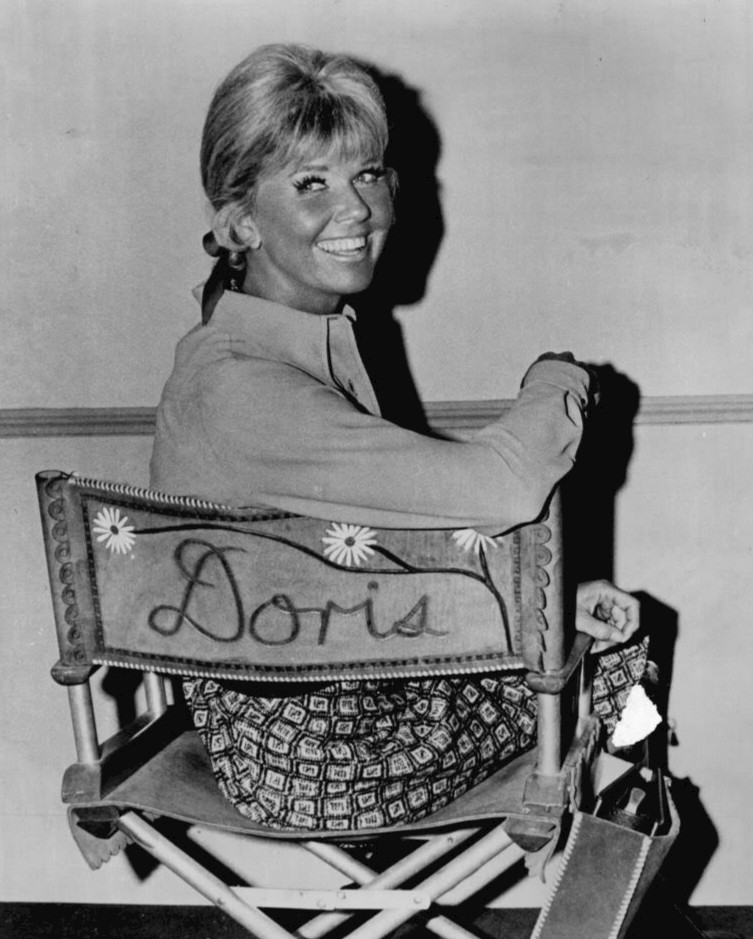
On set of show

The Doris Day Show is an American television sitcom that aired on CBS from September 24, 1968, to March 12, 1973, remaining on the air for five seasons and 128 episodes.

The series is remembered for its multiple format and cast changes over its five-year run. The show is also notable for Day's statement, in her autobiography Doris Day: Her Own Story (1976), that her husband Martin M. Melcher had signed her to do the series without her knowledge, a fact she only discovered after he died shortly before production began.

== Series run ==
| Season | Episodes | Originally released | |
| Season | Episodes | First released | Last released |
|---|---|---|---|
| 1 | 28 | September 24, 1968 | April 29, 1969 |
| 2 | 26 | September 22, 1969 | April 6, 1970 |
| 3 | 26 | September 14, 1970 | April 27, 1971 |
| 4 | 24 | September 13, 1971 | March 6, 1972 |
| 5 | 24 | September 11, 1972 | March 12, 1973 |

=== Season 1 (1968–1969) ===
Day portrays Doris Martin, a widowed mother of young sons Billy and Toby (Philip Brown and Todd Starke, credited as Tod Starke). As the series begins, she has moved from New York City, where she worked as a writer for a women's magazine, to her father's farm in the fictional town of Cotina, California; the farm is later described as located at 32 Mill Valley Road in Mill Valley, north of San Francisco via the Golden Gate Bridge. Other regular characters include Doris's father, Buck Webb (Denver Pyle, who was actually just two years older than Day); their naïve hired ranch hand, LeRoy B. Simpson (James Hampton); and their housekeeper Aggie Thompson (Fran Ryan). After Ryan quit the show to replace Barbara Pepper as Doris Ziffel in Green Acres), the character of Aggie was replaced by Juanita (Naomi Stevens). Lord Nelson, the family's sheepdog, who appears in the first three seasons, is credited only in this one. Storylines focus on Doris's efforts to solve the everyday problems of her family and community as she adjusts to her new life on the farm.

=== Season 2 (1969–1970) ===
Doris begins to commute from the farm to San Francisco, where she becomes an executive secretary at Today's World magazine. New workplace characters are added: Today's World managing editor Michael Nicholson (McLean Stevenson), also referred to as Nick, is Doris's boss; Ron Harvey (Paul Smith) is associate editor; and Myrna Gibbons (Rose Marie) is Ron's secretary and Doris's best friend. LeRoy, now married and the owner of a gas station in Mill Valley, appears in only one episode. Storylines focus on Doris's struggles as a working mother; she also becomes involved in articles that the magazine is publishing and enters the dating world as well. Exterior establishing shots of the Today's World building actually show the Hartford Building, a 34-story high-rise located at 650 California Street in San Francisco.

=== Season 3 (1970–1971) ===
Tiring of her commute to work, Doris moves with her sons and dog to San Francisco, where they rent an apartment above an Italian restaurant named Pallucci's, located at the fictional address of 965 Jasper Street (later identified as 965 North Parkway, Apt. 207). The building and restaurant are owned by married couple Louie and Angie Pallucci (Bernie Kopell and Kaye Ballard). At first Louie is angry with Angie for renting the apartment to a widow with two boys and a large dog, but he eventually cherishes their new tenants after Billy and Toby praise his pizza. Angie becomes one of Doris's best friends. Doris begins writing articles for the magazine, but is still mainly a secretary. Buck appears in only two episodes; LeRoy, who now lives in Montana and travels the rodeo circuit to raise money to buy his own ranch, appears in only one. Doris's nemesis, efficiency expert Willard Jarvis (Billy De Wolfe), first seen in season 2, moves in next door, causing trouble for her in a few episodes. The season's last episode, which features Doris's niece April (Meredith Baxter) and her husband Peter (Michael Burns) struggling to adapt to life as a newly married couple, is a backdoor pilot for a series that was never picked up. It aired independently on CBS on May 24, 1974 as Young Love.

=== Seasons 4–5 (1971–1973) ===
The fourth season sees a radical change in the series. Doris's family and coworkers from the previous season disappear without explanation, and she becomes a single career woman. Still working for Today's World, her new boss is Cyril (Cy) Bennett (John Dehner), with whom she frequently spars, and she herself is now an associate editor who reports her own stories. Cy's secretary Jackie Parker (Jackie Joseph) is also Doris's friend. Angie appears in a few episodes, but Louie is in only one. Doris has several romances, including with Italian artist Carlo Benedetti (Cesare Danova), detective Sgt. Bill Winston (Robert Lansing), English author Sir Robert Kingsley (Jon Cypher), and musician Johnny Reb (Paul Hampton). In season 4, she begins a relationship with Dr. Peter Lawrence (Peter Lawford), which lasts until late into season 5. That relationship is followed by one with former boyfriend Jonathan Rusk (Patrick O'Neal), a television reporter who at one point runs for Congress. In season 5, Jarvis becomes the owner of Doris's building.

== Cast ==
=== Main cast ===
- Doris Day as Doris Martin
- Philip Brown as Billy Martin (Seasons 1–3)
- Todd Starke as Toby Martin (Seasons 1–3)
- Denver Pyle as Buck Webb (Seasons 1–2, recurring Season 3)
- Lord Nelson as Ralph the Dog (Seasons 1–2, recurring Season 3)
- James Hampton as LeRoy B. Simpson (Season 1, recurring Seasons 2–3)
- Fran Ryan as Aggie Thompson (first ten episodes of Season 1)
- Naomi Stevens as Juanita (last eighteen episodes of Season 1)
- McLean Stevenson as Michael 'Nick' Nicholson (Seasons 2–3)
- Rose Marie as Myrna Gibbons (Seasons 2–3)
- Paul Smith as Ron Harvey (Seasons 2–3)
- Bernie Kopell as Louie Pallucci (Season 3, recurring Season 4)
- Kaye Ballard as Angie Pallucci (Season 3, recurring Season 4)
- Billy DeWolfe as Willard Jarvis (recurring Seasons 2–5)
- John Dehner as Cyril Bennett (Seasons 4–5)
- Jackie Joseph as Jackie Parker (Seasons 4–5)
- Peter Lawford as Dr. Peter Lawrence (recurring Seasons 4–5)

=== Other notable cast ===
A number of other actors appeared in notable storylines covering several episodes sometimes over multiple seasons.

- Strother Martin as Tyrone Lovey (Season 1), an unscrupulous poacher and junk dealer
- Edward Andrews as Colonel Fairburn (Seasons 2–5), publisher of Today's World
- Larry Storch as Duke Farentino (Seasons 2–3), a boxer turned wannabe nightclub headliner
- Lew Ayres as William Tyler (Seasons 2–3), a reclusive billionaire businessman
- Johnny Haymer as Montagne (Seasons 2–3), a Parisian couturier
- Carol Worthington as Ethel Weber (Season 3), Doris's kooky friend who often acted as Billy and Toby's sitter (Worthington portrayed several other minor characters in the series prior to the Ethel Weber character)
- Richard Ely as Clifford Fairburn Jr. (Season 3), son of Colonel Fairburn
- Van Johnson as Charlie Webb (Seasons 3–4), Doris's free-spirited cousin
- Jon Cypher as Sir Robert Kingsley (Seasons 4–5), a British knight and author, who was one of Doris's love interests
- Patrick O'Neal as Jonathan Rusk (Season 5), Doris's old boyfriend, aspiring politician, fellow journalist and another of her current love interests

== Production ==
=== Development ===
Doris Day first found fame as a singer and then as one of the most popular film actresses of her generation. In 1951 she married her agent, Martin M. Melcher, who would come to control virtually every aspect of her career, including her finances. The following year the two formed a production company named Arwin Productions as a vehicle for projects to be produced by Melcher. In the late 1950s, he began a business relationship with attorney Jerome B. Rosenthal. After Day granted Melcher a general power of attorney, he increasingly signed her to projects without her prior consent and directed her income to Rosenthal, who invested it in a series of disastrous ventures. After Melcher died in 1968, Day learned that he had signed her to a five-year commitment to star in The Doris Day Show without her knowledge and that he and Rosenthal had not only lost all of her earnings, but had left her in debt. She fired Rosenthal and sued him for fraud and malpractice. In September 1974, Los Angeles Superior Court Judge Lester E. Olson granted her a judgment for $23,835,646. In an hour-long oral decision, he condemned Rosenthal, but also admonished Day for "being too busy making movies to pay attention to her own affairs." Rosenthal's appeal dragged on until October 1985, when the California Supreme Court rejected it, finally ending the case. Ultimately, the actress only recovered a fraction of her losses. Day's 1968 decision to fulfill her television commitment directly stemmed from her sense of honor and her desire to pay her debt and restore her financial security.

Before The Doris Day Show premiered, Day had appeared on television infrequently—mostly on variety, game, and awards shows. In the mid-1960s Melcher tried to persuade her to star in a television series because he believed the films she made had no place in the New Hollywood, which emphasized anti-establishment themes, morally ambiguous heroes, and explicit sex and violence. In fact, she turned down the role of Mrs. Robinson in The Graduate because it offended her values. Yet, she told Melcher she had no interest in television. Nevertheless, in 1966 Melcher and CBS discussed developing an hourlong anthology series for her. CBS was courting her because it sought celebrities to replenish its aging and depleted supply of star talent—specifically, to replace Lucille Ball, who was threatening to end The Lucy Show. Following in the footsteps of celebrities like Shirley Booth, who had achieved success in the early 1960s with the sitcom Hazel, Day was one of several film stars turning to television, and she would become the most successful by far.

In February 1967 Melcher told the Los Angeles Times he was negotiating with CBS for a television deal for Day, as well as a separate feature film deal. The television deal focused on a sitcom to be produced by Richard Dorso and Bob Sweeney under Arwin Productions. Fifteen script outlines were ready, and filming was scheduled to begin as soon as Day finished her then-current film project. Dorso was one of Melcher's copartners in their former agency, Century Artists; Sweeney was a director who had directed for The Andy Griffith Show. The Times also stated that the show would star Day as a widow named Doris Martin, who moves with her two sons to her father's farm after her husband dies (the name "Martin" may be a reference to Melcher). Melcher commented that Day would "stand for morality. Everything will be wholesome, as it is in her movies.'" In a later article, Dorso reinforced this perspective: "there's a little moral in each episode, and Doris, like she always is, is on the side of the angels." The television deal was finalized by May. According to its terms, Day would star in a sitcom for the 1968–1969 season without a pilot. Each episode would have a $120,000 budget, and Melcher would own the negatives and control the rerun rights. In addition, Day would be obligated to make two television films, later revised to two variety specials.

After the deal was finalized, The Doris Day Show entered development. On April 20, 1968, however, Melcher died unexpectedly of bacterial endocarditis. Despite multiple media reports of the deal, Day declares in her 1976 memoir that she did not know she had been committed to the show until after his death, when she found two completed scripts in his dressing room in their home. She asked her son, Terry Melcher, who was Martin Melcher's adopted stepson and the administrator of his estate, to investigate. He reported that her husband had signed her name to the contract and received a large advance, which Rosenthal had spent, and that the series was scheduled to begin production in six weeks. Her son also said that all of her earnings were gone and that she was $400,000 in debt. She was devastated: "I had lost three things: my husband, my life's savings, and my freedom—for television was much more rigid and confining than Warner Brothers ever was."

By 1968, Day's film persona had shifted from the wholesome girl next door to the sophisticated, independent career woman seen in romantic comedies like Pillow Talk. Yet, to her dismay her image as what she described as "America's wholesome virgin, the girl next door, carefree and brimming with happiness" persisted. This was one reason she despised the show's initial premise: "It was bad enough that I had been forced into television against my will, but what made it doubly repulsive was the nature of the setting that had been chosen for my weekly series. A farm. A widow with a couple of little kids living on a farm. With Grandpa, naturally. Whatever reputation I had made in films, it certainly wasn't bucolic. A farm would make it rather difficult to portray those characteristics of chic and sophistication that were so identified with the screen ladies I had portrayed. … In my wildest nightmares I would never have done scripts like those handed to me." Other members of the production team also tried stave off anticipated criticism of the show as overly sentimental. For example, Sweeney insisted Day's character would not be a "Goodie Two Shoes," but "an honest and intelligent modern woman with believable, albeit humorous problems."

=== Filming ===
Initial casting for the first season of The Doris Day Show was completed in April 1968, and filming began at Golden West Studios in Hollywood in early June 1968. Bruce Bilson, Gary Nelson, and Sweeney directed most of the episodes. The show was filmed with one camera rather than three by the cinematographer Richard L. Rawlings, who often used filters on close-ups of Day, as was the practice in many of her 1960s films. There was no studio audience. Filming was challenging for Day, who was playing the role of a widow shortly after she had lost her own husband. Sometimes she would burst out crying during a scene, and filming would have to pause until she composed herself, which led to production delays. In response, the writers tried to write around her character. In addition, her grueling schedule and her efforts to deal with the aftermath of her husband's death prevented her from becoming closely involved in production.

Initially, the show was to fill the Monday night slot occupied by The Lucy Show. However, when Ball decided not to leave CBS but to launch a new sitcom titled Here's Lucy, the network scheduled The Doris Day Show on Tuesdays at 9:30 pm. It followed The Red Skelton Hour and preceded 60 Minutes, which premiered that season as well. Its competition was ABC's N.Y.P.D., a half-hour crime drama, and NBC Tuesday Night at the Movies, which featured a combination of recent theatrical and new made-for-television films. The series premiere on September 24, 1968, was the eighth most viewed show for the week ending September 29 according to the Nielsen Multi-Network Area (MNA) ratings. Ratings steadily declined, however, and the show ranked at number 30 for the season. In addition, critical reviews were generally negative. One reporter even wrote that the show was "virtually a flop."

As filming for the first season concluded, Day realized she had to take charge of production and make major changes for the second season. Doris Martin becomes a working mother employed as a secretary at Today's World magazine in San Francisco, and the show's focus shifts from the farm to the city. Day replaced producers Sweeney and Dorso with Jack Elinson and Norman Paul. Coby Ruskin, Denver Pyle (whose role as an actor in the series was being reduced), and Frederick De Cordova directed most of the episodes. New writers and new supporting actors were added. Filming relocated to CBS Studio City, which Day preferred. She remarks in her memoir: "I emphasized that I didn't like joke comedy that relied on funny dialogue; I much prefer situation comedy, like Pillow Talk. I worked with the writers, set designers, costume designers, makeup, music—there wasn't an aspect of the show that I didn't get into. For the first time in my career I saw all the daily rushes and even involved myself in editing." She made these changes after examining the show critically and incorporating viewers' feedback.The show also moved to a new time slot: Mondays at 9:30 p.m., after Gunsmoke, Here's Lucy, and Mayberry R.F.D. and before The Carol Burnett Show (it remained in this slot for the rest of its run, although the shows that preceded and followed it shifted). Ratings improved dramatically.

While Day was happier filming the second season, she experienced another crisis after the brutal murders committed by Charles Manson's followers in August 1969 at the 10050 Cielo Drive home of director Roman Polanski. In 1968, her son Terry Melcher, a music producer, had auditioned Manson, a musician, but declined to offer him a contract; and Melcher had formerly lived at the home with his girlfriend, actress Candice Bergen. After police detectives informed him in November that Manson's followers may have been looking for him in revenge, he insisted that Day hire private security to patrol her home until the trial ended. Day stated that the "black shadow of these people [Manson and his followers] hung over our lives for more than a year."

This popular success of the second season may have inspired Day and the producers to firmly locate the show in the city for the third season, when Doris Martin and her sons move to San Francisco. Her responsibilities at Today's World expand, as she begins to research stories and even conduct interviews for subjects, including singer Tony Bennett. Reza Badiyi, Denver Pyle, and William Wiard directed most of the episodes in this season. However, ratings declined dramatically from the previous season.

The show introduced its final major format change in the fourth season, in response to programming shifts initiated by Fred Silverman, CBS's vice president, programs, to appeal to urban adult audiences. Doris Martin's family is dropped without explanation, and she becomes a single career woman in the city. A CBS press release proclaimed: "Gone will be Doris Martin, the widowed mother of two young sons who is a staff secretary for the San Francisco–based magazine, Today's World. In her place will be Doris Martin, the Today's World staff writer who is single and free to go anywhere her job or her fancy may dictate." At the time Silverman was in the midst of a radical overhaul of CBS's prime-time schedule that involved cancelling the network's rural comedies and variety shows and adding more sophisticated programs to attract the young, urban viewers advertisers desired—what became known as the "rural purge." He described The Doris Day Show as "too Pollyannaish, too saccharine": "If I look into my soul, I'm not 100% proud of The Doris Day Show, … but she serves a purpose." Seeking to leverage Day's film persona, he stated that the new Doris Martin "will be more like her movie personality—more glamorous and lots funnier." Thus, instead of cancelling the show, he supported transforming it into a more adult-oriented sitcom, like All in the Family and The Mary Tyler Moore Show.

To implement the changes, Silverman replaced Elinson and Paul with Edward H. Feldman, the producer of the hit CBS sitcom Hogan's Heroes, which had just ended its six-season run. Bruce Bilson, Norman Tokar, and William Wiard were among the pool of directors for this season. Feldman explained that Doris Martin was promoted to associate editor, a position analogous to the one held by The Mary Tyler Moore Show's Mary Richards, to "round out her character" and give her "more clout. And, given a star of Doris's versatility, we have been able to map a variety of different shows—adventure, love stories, mystery, slapstick, suspense—all of them based on adult comedy." He also stated she would have several love interests. Much of the fourth and fifth seasons' comedy derives from Day's interactions with the new supporting cast—especially John Dehner, who plays Doris Martin's temperamental boss Cy Bennett. Day stated that now she could enter her boss's "office and blow off steam; get in sharper dialog and have some fun with it. … And I'm going to have some romances, too.'" The show's ratings dropped slightly in the fourth season, and reviews were generally negative. For the fifth season, Day and the producers doubled down on the show' shift in tone. They transformed Doris Martin into a truly contemporary woman focused on her career who covers hard news, spars with her boss, uses current slang like "groovy" and "right on," and has multiple boyfriends. Marc Daniels, Roger Duchowny, and William Wiard directed most of the episodes. However, ratings dropped even more steeply.

=== Conclusion ===
In March 1973, shortly after the last episode of the fifth season aired, and after she had completed her five-year contract, Day announced she was ending the series: "I'm tired. Doing a film series is extremely hard work and I feel that five years is enough. There are so may other things to be done and said, and doing a situation comedy week after week is no longer fulfilling for me. It's time to go on to something else. … Entertainment is a valuable and worthwhile commodity. It has provided me with a good living for many years. But it is not the alpha and omega of the world. … I just don't think that another year of 'The Doris Day Show' in its present form is going to lead anybody anywhere, except maybe to the bank.'"

=== Syndication ===
Worldvision Enterprises Inc. offered The Doris Day Show for syndication for the first time in September 1976. However, the show's success in syndication was negatively affected by the fact that it was not syndicated sooner. It aired on CBN (Christian Broadcasting Network) in the 1980s.

== Opening title and credits ==
The original opening title and credits sequence of The Doris Day Show was created by Remi Kramer. The soundtrack consists of Day singing offscreen a rerecorded version of the Livingston & Evans song, "Qué Será, Será (Whatever Will Be, Will Be)." Day had introduced this song in the 1956 Alfred Hitchcock suspense film The Man Who Knew Too Much, in which she costarred with James Stewart. As the montage of images accompanying the song changes from season to season, so does the song's arrangement: A more family-oriented version, with a children's chorus, is used in the first season, while a more adult contemporary version with a stronger beat is used in the fourth and fifth seasons.

In the opening sequence for the first season, all of the regular cast members are portrayed in a bucolic environment that appears to be the family's farm. According to Philip Brown, who played Billy, this sequence was filmed at Golden Oak Ranch, also known as Disney Ranch, near Los Angeles.

For the second season, Doris, wearing a bright yellow overcoat and rain hat, leaves the farm in her red convertible as Buck and the boys see her off. She drives along a country highway, over the Golden Gate Bridge, and finally down a hill to her office building at 650 California Street in San Francisco's Financial District. A brief montage of shots of the city, some including Doris, is followed by the cast credits, with Buck and the boys shown at the farm and Mr. Nicholson and Myrna in the Today's World offices. There are also images of Doris, wearing a red raincoat, hopping off of a cable car and of Doris, again wearing her yellow overcoat, holding her hat on her head as she scurries across California Street to her office; the woman in these shots is actually Day's stunt double, Julie Ann Johnson, who had served as Day's double since the film Caprice. This version of the opening sequence foreshadows the opening sequence of The Mary Tyler Moore Show, which features Mary Richards driving from her hometown to Minneapolis to start her new life.

The opening sequence for the third season opens with Doris, wearing a yellow pantsuit, descending the spiral staircase in her apartment, followed by an iconic overhead view of San Francisco, over which the show's title is superimposed. The rest of the sequence is similar to the second season's, except that the Today's World staff members (featuring Myrna, Ron, and Mr. Nicholson, in that order) appear before Doris's sons, who are now seen playing in an urban playground instead of on the farm. Despite being frequent cast members, the Palluccis and Jarvis are not included.

For the fourth and fifth seasons, the show opens with a shot, over which the title is superimposed, of a cable car traveling down a San Francisco street, with the Today's World building in the background. This brief shot is then followed by a teaser that sets up the episode. After the teaser, the opening sequence is similar to the third season's. Doris, wearing a yellow pantsuit, descends the spiral staircase in her apartment (in the final episodes of the fifth season, she wears a black frilled gown instead). After she, Cy, and Jackie are credited, there is also a montage of shots of Doris modeling outfits in a fashion show.

== Reception ==
=== Nielsen ratings ===
| Season | Time slot | Rank | Rating | Households (in millions) |
|---|---|---|---|---|
| 1) 1968–1969 | Tuesday at 9:30pm | #30 | 20.4 | 11.9 |
| 2) 1969–1970 | Monday at 9:30pm | #10 | 22.8 | 13.3 |
| 3) 1970–1971 | Monday at 9:30pm | #20 | 20.7 | 12.4 |
| 4) 1971–1972 | Monday at 9:30pm | #23 | 21.2 | 13.2 |
| 5) 1972–1973 | Monday at 9:30pm | #37 | 18.6 | |

=== Reviews ===
Initial reviews of The Doris Day Show were mixed. The Hollywood Reporter predicted the show would be a hit: "Miss Day is encapsulated by a production company and a supporting cast which are flawless. Their output is not be faulted in its delivery, although some critics may gag on the syrupdipity of the theme." Variety also praised the show: "Premiere this week showed promise …. As in films, Miss Day here displays her unusual talent for somehow squeezing the corn juice out of a square role. She is evocative and believable, and, in fact the whole show is well cast …. Bob Sweeney's direction set a nice mood and pace, and Dick Bensfield's script was firstrate for the genre." The Los Angeles Times was complimentary, but mocked the show's wholesomeness: "CBS's new Doris Day Show … is three parts Donna Reed, two parts Father (or Mother) Knows Best, a dash of Petticoat Junction and sprinkled lightly with 'America the Beautiful.' … It was predictable and thoroughly wholesome. The dialog, however, wasn't bad, and the production values were excellent. It was nonviolent too. The Doris Day Show will make Family Affair look like a meeting of the mafia." In his full-page review for TV Guide, however, Cleveland Amory was less enthusiastic. Although he refrained from criticizing Day's performance, he commented that she "is photographed through so many filters that you feel she is not on TV but on your radio." In addition, he described the show as void of ideas, stocked with irritating supporting characters, and burdened by plots "buried under so many layers of cotton-candy writing, not to mention the thunderous laugh track, that they deserve better. … Not only is this show no more interesting than anyone's everyday life, it's a good deal less so."

In a review of the second-season premiere, Variety responded positively to the show's shift in format, concluding that the show "arouses empathy in the viewer to immediately place it several notches above and probably into what CBS publicists call 'the winner's circle.'" It also correctly predicted that the "show shapes up as a Nielsen favorite." Its review of the third-season review was much more negative: "'The Doris Day Show' should get the nod for sheer grit if for nothing else. Since its unspectacular first season, it has survived two theme changes and now places the star in an urban setting (San Francisco) at the tail end of CBS's Monday night western-rural axis." It continued: "The preemer struck no bright sparks with the exception of Kaye Ballard's florid portrayal as Miss Day's new Italian landlady. Miss Day is still essentially a one-note (poignancy) actress, and producer-writers Jack Elinson and Norman Paul did very little to enlarge upon her talents. The storyline was thin and episodic and ran down to a predictable conclusion. Miss Day could use stronger character support." The Los Angeles Times also gave the first two episodes of the third season a tepid review. While it noted that the second episode has "a good uncluttered script" and offered Day "a chance to be funny by knocking militant feminists," offering "a ray of hope" for the show, it also remarked: "Day is a pro at projecting babbling, innocent covered-up sex appeal. There wasn't a thought or joke in either episode that would have gone over the heads of most eight-year-olds."

Reviews of the fourth season premiere generally agreed that the efforts to transform the show into a more adult-oriented sitcom like The Mary Tyler Moore Show were not successful. For example, The Hollywood Reporter opined: "Considering the potentialities of a name-brand actor in a prime-time slot, the result was a mediocre premiere. Variety suggested that the new format "seems to be seeking a format somewhat akin to the Mary Tyler Moore skein. Her boss, John Dehner, was introed as a mixture of the Edward Asner and Ted Knight characters on the Moore show, with other regular Jackie Joseph … not given enough to do." It also criticized the quality of the script: "[T]he writing level needs upgrading to get some basically funny relations going between the principals—or else Miss Day could be in trouble, despite the bright appeal of her own character within the context of the show."

=== Awards ===
The Doris Day Show received no Emmy Award nominations during its five-year run. It did, however, receive two Golden Globe nominations in 1969: The show was nominated for Best Television Series, and Day was nominated for Best Actress in a Television Series. Also in 1969, the sheepdog Lord Nelson, who played the role of Doris Martin's pet during the show's first three seasons, was nominated for a PATSY Award, presented by the American Humane Association.

== Home media ==
MPI Home Video has released all five seasons of The Doris Day Show on DVD in Region 1. Each DVD release contains extensive special features. In Region 2, Turbine Medien has released all 18 available German episodes of the first and second seasons on DVD in Germany, with extensive special features. In Region 4, Umbrella Entertainment has released all five seasons on DVD in Australia. In 2009, all five seasons were rereleased with slimmer packaging.

| DVD Name | Ep # | Release Date | |
| DVD Name | Ep # | Region 1 | Region 4 |
|---|---|---|---|
| Season 1 | 28 | June 28, 2005 | November 11, 2005 |
| Season 2 | 26 | October 25, 2005 | April 10, 2006 |
| Season 3 | 26 | May 30, 2006 | November 6, 2006 |
| Season 4 | 24 | February 27, 2007 | April 2, 2007 |
| Season 5 | 24 | November 20, 2007 | January 12, 2008 |
| The Complete Series | 128 | November 25, 2008 | N/A |

== Themes and analysis ==
Although Day did not want to star in a television series, The Doris Day Show revitalized her career and brought her financial security as her lawsuit against her former attorney Jerome B. Rosenthal made its way through the courts. When the show premiered in September 1968, it was what her biographer Tom Santopietro described as "comfort food television" at one of the most tumultuous times in US history. During this year, the Vietnam War and protests against it escalated, Martin Luther King Jr. and Robert F. Kennedy were assassinated, thousands of people were injured during riots at the Democratic National Convention in Chicago, and a contentious election took place. By contrast, the problems that Doris Martin faced were minor in comparison and always happily resolved by the end of each episode. As Santopietro observed, the show presented "a successful one-woman battle to uphold an optimistic vision of everyday life in America, one without vulgarity, and with humor arising out of situations rather than increasingly cynical one liners." He analyzes each season of the show in depth in his biography of Day, while Patrick Pierre and Garry McGee's Que Sera, Sera: The Magic of Doris Day Through Television: Special Interviews with Doris Day and Friends includes a detailed episode guide and other features.

The Doris Day Show's popular fashion show episodes exemplify the sitcom's status as comfort food television. Day loved fashion. Beginning with Pillow Talk, she began to cultivate an image in her films as a successful career woman who wears the most fashionable clothes. She carried her interest in fashion over to The Doris Day Show. Most of the clothes she wore were purchased by her costumer, Connie Edney, off the rack from the high-end department store Joseph Magnin in Los Angeles, which closed in the 1980s. In response to comments from some viewers that her outfits looked too expensive for a secretary (later an associate editor) to afford, she stated many of them cost only $39.95. Beginning in the show's second season, after Doris Martin begins commuting to San Francisco, each season features an episode that works into the storyline a fashion show, in which she models all the clothes. The fashion shows became more elaborate each year, culminating with a fifth-season episode in which Doris Martin models 19 outfits in a series of vignettes with a male model made up as a mannequin, choreographed to songs from Day's films. In 1971 Day told a reporter: "It's certainly my favorite thing we do all year, because I really love clothes. Apparently the audience likes it too, because it's always the highest-rated segment we do." She further commented: "If we keep it up for ten years, you could play back the fashion history of an entire decade in about twenty minutes." In 1972, Day was presented with the National Fashion Wagon Week Award to the American Working Girl for portraying a stylish working woman who "symbolizes the modern woman in the world of business."

Despite its comedic focus, the show also addressed social issues in each of its five seasons—most importantly, the challenges of single working women. For example, it dealt with subjects such as racial bigotry, pollution, sexual harassment, ageism, animal welfare, and the struggles of women in the workplace. Yet, it always treated these issues with a light comic touch, and never with the sharpness of the emerging generation of sitcoms, like All in the Family and M*A*S*H. But through its multiple format changes, the show became one of the most successful examples of a trend in sitcoms of the late 1960s and early 1970s that focused on portraying single working women. In 1968, NOW (National Organization for Women) published a report recommending the production of a multiplicity of new images of women in the media to combat old stereotypes. That September, the show was one of four new sitcoms featuring families led by widows; the others were The Ghost and Mrs. Muir, Here's Lucy, and Julia. This phenomenon disturbed some commentators, who claimed that it offered a distorted version of the average household and encouraged the networks to refocus on "normal" families, like the one represented in Father Knows Best. This criticism suggests even though The Doris Day Show can be described as a fairly old-fashioned, conventional sitcom, elements of it questioned traditional norms.

The show's evolution into a series centering on an independent, working woman was gradual—and influenced in part by the success of The Mary Tyler Moore Show. In the first season, Doris Martin is a widowed mother who has left her career as a respected journalist for a women's magazine in New York to live on her father’s farm with her two sons. In the second season, she transitions back into the workforce as a secretary for Today's World magazine, commuting into San Francisco, and in the third season she and her sons move into a city apartment; a few episodes during these two seasons highlight the challenges of single, working mothers. Finally, a radical fourth-season overhaul strips away her domestic ties entirely, transforming her into a childfree associate editor and a true career woman—similar to the one she was before the series began and the ones that Day had played in her most successful films from 1959 to 1968. Like other single-woman sitcoms of the era, The Doris Day Show struggled with appealing to "new women" while not alienating more traditional viewers. Thus, while some episodes, for example, emphasize Doris Martin's efforts to cover hard news instead of the "women's beat," others stress that she does not identify as a feminist and still others try to strike a balance, portraying her as a talented journalist eminently qualified to serve as editor in chief of Today's World who nevertheless protects her temperamental male boss.

The show is also significant because it focuses on an older single woman. Most single-woman sitcoms from this era feature young women, such as Ann Marie (Marlo Thomas) in That Girl, Mary Richards (Mary Tyler Moore) in The Mary Tyler Moore Show, and Sandy Stockton (Sandy Duncan) in Funny Face and The Sandy Duncan Show. As the feminist writer Caroline Bird commented at the time, "You'd never learn from television that … half the working women in America are older than 37, or that there is any satisfying life at all for women at that age." When Day began the series, she was 46, and when she ended it, she was almost 51. In what is perhaps an idealized portrayal, she is always represented as a woman who is both successful in her career and desired by multiple romantic partners.
