= The Terratin Incident =

- Star Trek: The Animated Series episode
- Episode no.: Season 1 Episode 11
- Directed by: Hal Sutherland
- Written by: Paul Schneider
- Production code: 22015
- Original air date: November 17, 1973

Episode chronology
← Previous "Mudd's Passion"	Next → "The Time Trap"

"The Terratin Incident" is the eleventh episode of the first season of the American animated science fiction television series Star Trek. It first aired in the NBC Saturday morning lineup on November 17, 1973, and was written by American screenwriter Paul Schneider (Note: This story was expanded into a novelette by science-fiction author Alan Dean Foster as part of the collection, Star Trek Log Four (1975) (ISBN 0-345-24435-4).) who had previously written the Original Series episodes "Balance of Terror" and "The Squire of Gothos". It came from a one-paragraph story idea by Gene Roddenberry based on Gulliver's Travels.

In this episode, after an apparent attack, the crew of the Enterprise find themselves beginning to shrink in size toward the point that they will no longer be able to control the ship.

== Plot ==
While observing a burnt-out supernova, the Federation starship Enterprise picks up a strange message transmitted in a two-hundred-year-old Earth code. The signal is traced to a nearby planet. When the Enterprise enters orbit, it is hit by an energy beam of "spiroid radiation" that damages its dilithium crystals and causes the crew to shrink (along with all other organic material aboard the ship, including the crew's uniforms). Chief Medical Officer Dr. McCoy determines that the crew will continue to shrink beyond their ability to control the ship unless a cure is found.

Captain Kirk beams down to the surface and finds that the transporter can revert crew members to their original size. He also observes what appears to be a miniature city. Kirk returns to the ship, but the crew are now too small for him to see easily, and too small to operate the ship's controls. Meanwhile, the Terratins have beamed the bridge crew down to their city, where the crew learns the Terratins' fate. Terratin is a lost Earth colony, originally called "Terra Ten"; its inhabitants have mutated because of the supernova's radiation, and are now all approximately one-sixteenth of an inch in height. The beam which caused the crew to shrink was not intended as an attack, but was the only way the Terratins had to draw attention to themselves. The crew are beamed back to the ship and return to normal size. However, the Terratins have been small for generations and cannot be restored to normal size. Their planet is in peril from massive volcanic activity, so the whole Terratin city is beamed aboard the Enterprise, and moved to another planet.

== Reception ==
This episode was noted as a case where the fictional Star Trek transporter technology changes the size of the entity being transported, along with "The Counter Clock Incident" from the same TV series.

The episode is noted for harnessing the flexibility of the animated format, by having the bridge crew of the Enterprise shrink.

== See also ==
- "The Lorelei Signal" - an earlier animated episode where the idea of using the transporter to restore physical patterns is introduced
- "One Little Ship" - an episode of Star Trek: Deep Space Nine where a Starfleet runabout and its crew are miniaturized
