= Edgar A. Guest =

British-born American writer and poet (1881–1959)

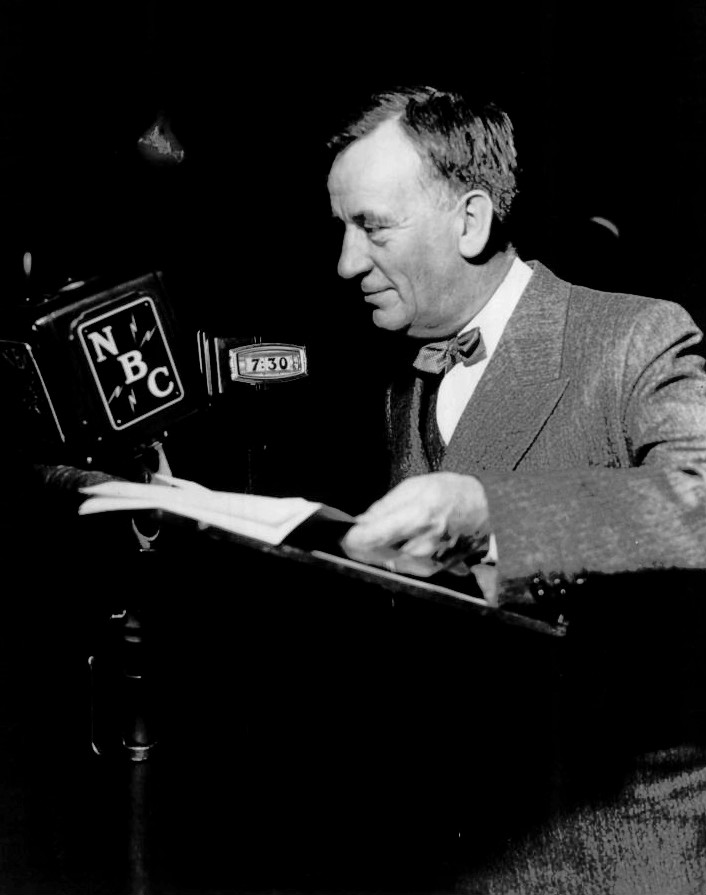
- Guest on his radio program, 1935.
- Born: Edgar Albert Guest; 20 August 1881; Birmingham, England
- Died: 5 August 1959 (aged 77); Detroit, Michigan, U.S.
- Resting place: Woodlawn Cemetery
- Occupation: Poet
- Spouse: Nellie Crossman (m. 1906)
- Children: 3
- Writing career
- Pen name: Eddie Guest

Edgar Albert Guest (20 August 1881 – 5 August 1959) was a British-born American poet who became known as the People's Poet. His poems often had an inspirational and optimistic view of everyday life.

== Early life ==
Guest was born in Birmingham, England in 1881, to Edwin and Julia Wayne Guest. In 1891, his family moved from England to Detroit, Michigan, where Guest lived for the rest of his life.

== Career ==
After he began at the Detroit Free Press as a copy boy and then a reporter, his first poem appeared on 11 December 1898. He became a naturalized citizen in 1902. For 40 years, Guest was widely read throughout North America, and his sentimental, optimistic poems were in the same vein as the light verse of Nick Kenny, who wrote syndicated columns during the same decades.

From his first published work in the Detroit Free Press until his death in 1959, Guest penned some 11,000 poems which were syndicated in some 300 newspapers and collected in more than 20 books, including A Heap o' Livin' (1916) and Just Folks (1923–1957). In 1952, Guest was made Poet Laureate of Michigan, the only poet to have been awarded the title until 2023, when the position was revived.

His popularity led to a weekly Detroit radio show which he hosted from 1931 until 1942, followed by a 1951 NBC television series, A Guest in Your House. He also had a thrice-weekly transcribed radio program that began 15 January 1941, and was sponsored by Land O'Lakes Creameries. The program featured singer Eddy Howard.

Guest was made a Freemason in Detroit, where he was a lifetime member of Ashlar Lodge No. 91. In honor of Guest's devotion to the Craft, community, and humanity in general, the Grand Lodge of Free and Accepted Masons of Michigan established the Edgar A. Guest Award for lodges to present to non-Masons within the community who have demonstrated distinguished service to the community and their fellow man.

Guest was a member of The Tin Whistles. Guest was asked to read a couple of poems for the 1922 Annual Banquet, instead he came up with two new poems, one about Pinehurst and about The Tin Whistles.

When Guest died in 1959, he was buried in Detroit's Woodlawn Cemetery.

His grandniece Judith Guest is a novelist best known for Ordinary People.

== Reputation ==
Guest's work still occasionally appears in periodicals such as Reader's Digest, and some favorites, such as "Myself" and "Thanksgiving," are still studied today. However, in one of the most quoted appraisals of his work, Dorothy Parker reputedly said: "I'd rather flunk my Wassermann test than read a poem by Edgar Guest."

== In popular culture ==
In 1924, American composer Gertrude Martin Rohrer used Guest's text for her song "Results and Roses".

Edgar Guest is a favorite poet of Edith Bunker from the TV show All in the Family. She quotes him in a few episodes, including "Prisoner in the House", first broadcast on 4 January 1975.

Guest is mentioned several times in the eleventh book in Lemony Snicket's A Series of Unfortunate Events, The Grim Grotto. Klaus Baudelaire recalls how he was once given a Hobson's choice of doing the dishes or reading Guest's poetry, and the villainous crew of Count Olaf's submarine Carmelita wear badges depicting Guest (in contrast to the heroes' badges depicting Herman Melville). The book's author goes out of his way to praise Melville and disparage Guest as a "writer of limited skill, who wrote awkward, tedious poetry on hopelessly sentimental topics."

In the novel I Am Legend, the main character Robert Neville sardonically comments on his own internal monologue: "The last man in the world is Edgar Guest".

Guest's poem "It Couldn't Be Done" was recited by Idris Elba on the BBC's Sports Personality of the Year Award on 16 December 2012 whilst celebrating Team GB and Paralympics GB winning the team award for 2012.

Guest's poem "The Epicure" was reproduced in Mad #84 (January 1964) with new illustrations by Don Martin.

Guest's poem "See It Through," was used in a Chrysler 300 commercial.

Guest's poem Don't Quit ("When things go wrong, as they sometimes will..") was paraphrased in The Doris Day Show, The Librarian, episode 9, season I. Incidentally Don't Quit is also attributed to John Greenleaf Whittier (1807 – 1892). The International Horseshoers' Monthly Magazine (January 1922) attributes it to National labor Journal as the source, without naming the author.

Guest's poem "It Couldn't Be Done" was used in an Audi commercial.

Tracey Gold did read Guest's poem "A Child of Mine" during the funeral of Judith Barsi.

"It Couldn't Be Done" inspired a parody, "They Said That It Couldn't Be Done", by comedian Benny Hill.

Guest's poem "Equipment" was used in part for inspiration in the work of J.I.D. on his single "Skeegee".

== Works ==
- Home Rhymes, from Breakfast Table Chat (1909)
- The Panama Canal (1915)
- A Heap o' Livin' (1916)
- Just Glad Things (1916)
- Just Folks (1917)
- Over Here (1918)
- Poems of Patriotism (1918)
- The Path to Home (1919)
- A Dozen New Poems (1920)
- The Lamb Skin (1920)
- Sunny Songs (1920)
- Keep Going (Don't Quit) (1921)
- When Day Is Done (1921)
- Don't Quit (3 March 1921)
- All That Matters (1922)
- Making The House A Home (1922)
- The Passing Throng (1923)
- Rhymes of Childhood (1924)
- Mother (1925)
- The Light of Faith (1926)
- The Secret of The Ages (1926)
- You (1927)
- Harbor Lights of Home (1928)
- You Can't Live Your Own Life (1929)
- Poems for the Home Folks (1930)
- The Friendly Way (1931)
- Faith (1932)
- Life's Highway (1933)
- Collected Verse of Edgar Guest (1934)
- All in a Lifetime (1938)
- Between You and Me: My Philosophy of Life (1938)
- Today and Tomorrow (1942)
- Living the Years (1949)
- Sermons We See
- Courage
- The Proof of Worth
- See It Through
- Life's Slacker
- Team Work
- Can't
- At Christmas
- Things Work Out
- Have you Earned your Tomorrow
- Girl I Hope You Understand'
- A Child of Mine'
