= Margaret Armen =

American screenwriter and author

Margaret Alberta Armen
- Born: Margaret Alberta Sampsell; September 9, 1921; Washington, D.C., U.S.
- Died: November 10, 2003 (aged 82); Woodland Hills, Los Angeles, California, U.S.
- Resting place: Forest Lawn Memorial Park, Hollywood Hills
- Education: University of California
- Occupations: Screenwriter, author
- Years active: 1960–1984
- Spouse: Garo Armen
- Children: 1

Margaret Alberta Armen (September 9, 1921 – November 10, 2003) was an American screenwriter and author.

== Biography ==
She was born Margaret Alberta Sampsell in Washington, D.C., the daughter of Commander Thomas Lloyd Sampsell (1894–1964) and Florence Neilson (née Buehler, 1885–1977). Her father was a dental surgeon serving in the United States Navy Dental Corps, and she grew up in Manila, Panama, Japan, and spent four years living in Peking, China, where she learned Mandarin.

She graduated with a degree in English literature from the University of California, Berkeley, then studied creative writing at University of California, Los Angeles. On June 30, 1945, she married Garo Armen, a naval officer, and started a family. While raising her son, she worked from home, writing newspaper articles and short stories, before finally breaking into television writing Westerns, furnishing scripts for Dick Powell's Zane Grey Theatre (1960), The Rebel (1961), Lawman (1960–62), The Tall Man (1962), The Rifleman (1960–63) and The Big Valley (1965–69) during the 1960s.

She was also responsible for three episodes of the original Star Trek series, writing "The Gamesters of Triskelion" and "The Paradise Syndrome" (both 1968), and provided the final teleplay for "The Cloud Minders" (1969). She later wrote two episodes of Star Trek: The Animated Series ("The Lorelei Signal" and "The Ambergris Element", both 1973). Armen also co-wrote (with Alfred Harris) "The Savage Syndrome", an episode of the cancelled series Star Trek: Phase II.

During the 1970s, she also wrote episodes for the detective series Ironside (1973), Cannon (1975), Baretta (1977) and Barnaby Jones (1977, 1978), as well as the science fiction series The Six Million Dollar Man (1975), Land of the Lost (1974, 1975), The Bionic Woman (1978) and Jason of Star Command (1979).

In the early 1980s, she wrote episodes of Fantasy Island (1981), Flamingo Road (1981) and Emerald Point N.A.S. (1983). Although primarily a writer for episodic television, she wrote the television movie The New Daughters of Joshua Cabe (1976) for the series ABC Movie of the Week. Armen ceased writing for television in 1983, publishing the western novel The Hanging of Father Miguel in 1984.

Armen was a member of Western Writers of America from 1968, and also served on the board of governors of the Television Academy for two years from 1970, and on the board of directors of the Writers Guild of America, West, for three years from 1975.

Armen died of heart failure in 2003 at her home in Woodland Hills, Los Angeles, and is buried at Forest Lawn Memorial Park, Hollywood Hills.

== Filmography ==
=== Television ===
| Year | TV Series | Credit | Notes |
|---|---|---|---|
| 1960 | Dick Powell's Zane Grey Theatre | Writer | 1 Episode |
| 1960–62 | Lawman | Writer | 4 Episodes |
| 1960–63 | The Rifleman | Writer | 5 Episodes |
| 1961 | The Rebel | Writer | 1 Episode |
| 1961–62 | National Velvet | Writer | 2 Episodes |
| 1962 | The New Loretta Young Show | Writer | 1 Episode |
| 1962 | The Tall Man | Writer | 1 Episode |
| 1963 | Ripcord | Writer | 1 Episode |
| 1963 | The Travels Of Jaimie McPheeters | Writer | 1 Episode |
| 1964 | Mr. Novak | Writer | 1 Episode |
| 1965–69 | The Big Valley | Writer | 10 Episodes |
| 1968–69 | Star Trek | Writer | 3 Episodes |
| 1969 | The Name of The Game | Writer | 1 Episode |
| 1969 | Marcus Welby, M.D. | Writer | 1 Episode |
| 1969–70 | The Mod Squad | Writer | 2 Episode |
| 1973 | Ironside | Writer | 1 Episode |
| 1973 | Star Trek: The Animated Series | Writer | 2 Episodes |
| 1974–75 | Land Of The Lost | Writer | 2 Episodes |
| 1975 | Cannon | Writer | 2 Episodes |
| 1975 | The Six Million Dollar Man | Writer | 1 Episode |
| 1975 | The Wide World of Mystery | Writer | 1 Episode |
| 1976 | Wonder Woman | Writer | 1 Episode |
| 1976 | The New Daughters of Joshua Cabe | Writer | Television Movie |
| 1977 | Baretta | Writer | 1 Episode |
| 1977–78 | Barnaby Jones | Writer | 2 Episodes |
| 1978 | The Bionic Woman | Writer | 1 Episode |
| 1979 | Jason of Star Command | Writer | 1 Episode |
| 1981 | Fantasy Island | Writer | 1 Episode |
| 1981 | Flamingo Road | Writer | 4 Episodes |
| 1983 | Emerald Point N.A.S. | Writer | 1 Episode |
