= 80 Steps to Jonah =

1969 film by Gerd Oswald

- Theatrical release poster
- Directed by: Gerd Oswald
- Screenplay by: Frederick Louis Fox
- Story by: Frederick Louis Fox; Gerd Oswald
- Produced by: Gerd Oswald
- Starring: Wayne Newton; Jo Van Fleet; Keenan Wynn; Diana Ewing; Mickey Rooney; Sal Mineo
- Cinematography: Joseph LaShelle
- Edited by: Anthony DiMarco
- Music by: George Shearing
- Production company: Warner Bros.-Seven Arts
- Distributed by: Warner Bros.-Seven Arts
- Release date: December 1, 1969
- Running time: 107 minutes
- Country: United States
- Language: English

80 Steps to Jonah is a 1969 American drama film directed by Gerd Oswald, written by Frederick Louis Fox, and starring Wayne Newton, Jo Van Fleet, Keenan Wynn, Diana Ewing, Mickey Rooney and Sal Mineo. It was released by Warner Bros.-Seven Arts in December 1969.

== Plot ==
Mark Jonah Winters is a migrant worker who hitches a ride with Jerry Taggart. A car crash kills Taggert, and when the police arrive on the scene Jonah learns he had been riding in a stolen car. He is accused of car theft and, since he believes he cannot prove his innocence, he flees before he can be arrested.

Jonah spends the night sleeping in a field, and awakes to find four blind children, staying at a nearby blind camp. He meets camp housekeeper Nonna and camp director Tracy, who believe him to be the handyman they were expecting. Jonah begins working at the camp, and gains the trust of the children, whom he can relate to because he had been orphaned as a child. Nonna sees a photo of Jonah in the newspaper and, though she knows he is wanted by the police, does not turn him in.

Eventually the police arrive at the camp, and arrest Jonah. At the police station a drunkard named Wilfred Bashford, who had spoken to Jonah just before he was given a ride by Taggert, is able to corroborate that Jonah had not been the driver of the stolen car. Jonah is freed, and returns to his friends at the camp.

== Cast ==
- Wayne Newton as Mark Jonah Winters
- Jo Van Fleet as Nonna
- Keenan Wynn as Barney Glover
- Diana Ewing as Tracy Rutledge
- Mickey Rooney as Wilfred Bashford
- Sal Mineo as Jerry Taggart
- R. G. Armstrong as Mackray
- Slim Pickens as Scott
- Frank Schuller as Witney
- Dennis Cross as Maxon
- Brandon Cruz as Little Joe Wilson
- Erin Moran as Kim
- Teddy Quinn as Richard
- Michele Tobin as Cathy
- Susan Mathews as Velma
- Ira Angustain as Pepe
- Lilly Martens as Nina
- Butch Patrick as Brian Hofstadter
- Lord Nelson as Ralph the Dog
- Coby Denton as Wilks
- Joe Conley as Jenkins
- Fred Dale as Sheriff
- Don Familton as Sheriff
- Holger Bendixen as Fisherman
- James Bacon as Hobo
- Jackie Kahane as himself
