= Diana Ewing =

American actress

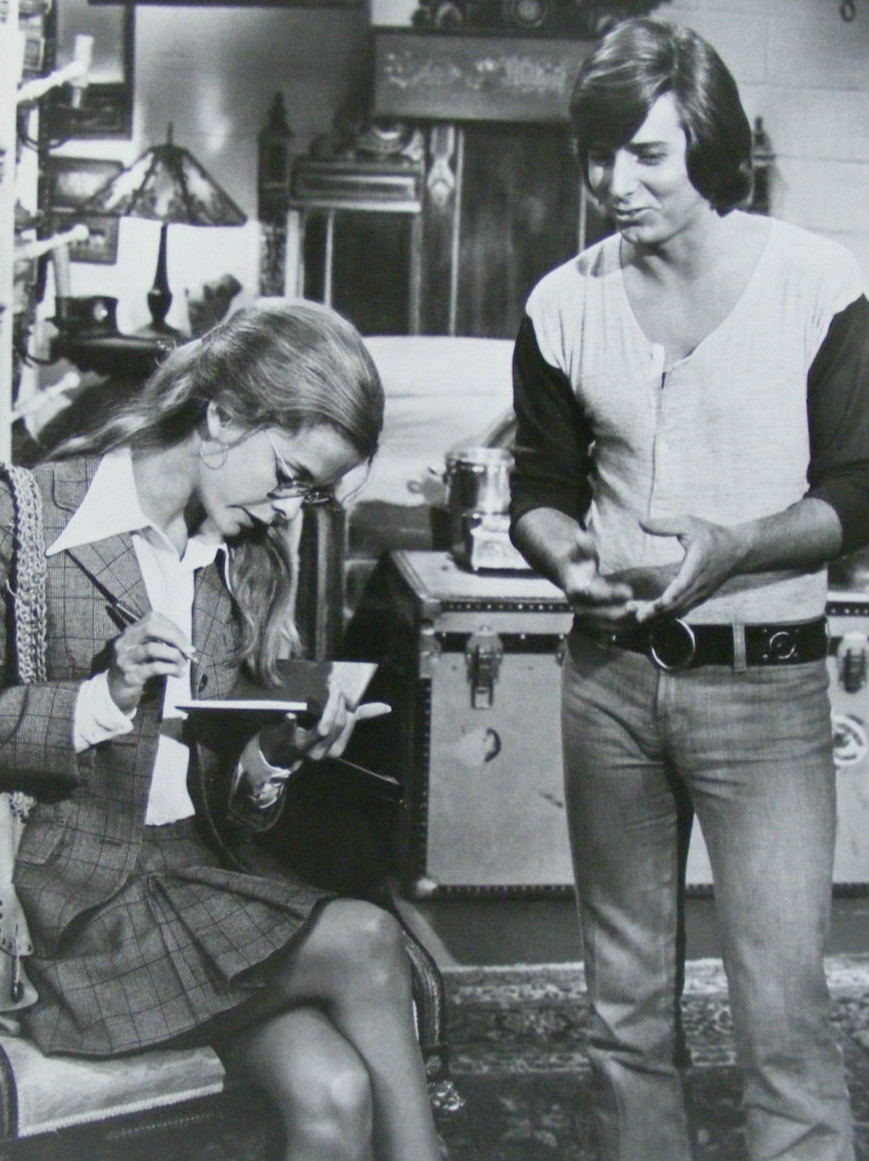
- Ewing and Bobby Sherman on TV's Getting Together (1971)
- Born: January 4, 1946 (age 80); Honolulu, Territory of Hawaii
- Occupation: Actress (until 1977)
- Years active: 1968–1977
- Known for: Droxine in Star Trek; The Way We Were; Knife for the Ladies
- Spouses: Timothy Woolley Quealy (m. 1965; div. 196?); Charles Shyer (m. 1969; div. 1974)

Diana Ewing (born January 4, 1946) is an American former actress.

== Early years ==
Born in Honolulu, Ewing acted in plays at Punahou School and Honolulu Community Theater, in her teenage years. She is the daughter of Marjorie A. Ewing and William Hugh Ewing, Jr., who was editor of the Honolulu Star-Bulletin and covered the Attack on Pearl Harbor for the Associated Press. She worked at a newspaper during the summers of her high-school years, and she attended Sarah Lawrence College.

== Career ==
Ewing acted at the Manhattan Playhouse in East Palo Alto, California. Productions in which she performed included The Master Builder and Slow Dance on the Killing Ground.

Ewing guest-starred on several television series including The Mod Squad (1968); Love, American Style (1969); Mission: Impossible (1969); The Big Valley (1969); The F.B.I. (1970); Archer (1975); Washington: Behind Closed Doors (1977); Harry O (1974); and The Rockford Files (1977). One of her earliest television roles was in the original Star Trek in the third-season episode 21 "The Cloud Minders" (1969) as Droxine.

Ewing made her feature film debut in the supporting role of Tracy Rutledge, in the movie 80 Steps to Jonah (1969), and also appeared in Play It as It Lays (1972) and The Way We Were (1973). Her last appearance on the big screen was as Jenny in the western thriller Knife for the Ladies (1974). Her last television appearance was in Washington: Behind Closed Doors.

== Personal life ==
Ewing married Timothy Woolley Quealy on June 17, 1965. She was thereafter married to writer Charles Shyer from 1969 until 1974.

== Filmography ==
=== Film ===
Year	Title	Role	Notes
1969	80 Steps to Jonah	Tracy Rutledge	
1972	Play It As It Lays	Susannah	
1973	The Way We Were	Vicki Bissinger	
1974	Knife for the Ladies	Jenny	

=== Television ===
Year	Title	Role	Notes
1968	The Mod Squad	Karen Westphal	Episode: "Love"
1969	Mission: Impossible	Stephanie	Episode: "Live Bait"
1969	Star Trek	Droxine	S3:E21, "The Cloud Minders"
1969	The Big Valley	Maggie Delaney	Episode: "Town of No Exit"
1969	Love, American Style	Katy	Episode: segment "Love and Take Me Along"
1969	Love, American Style	Katherine Walker	Episode: segment "Love and the Single Couple"
1969	Gunsmoke	Ella Horton	Episode: "MacGraw"
1970	Lancer	Sarah Calhoun	Episode: "Splinter Group"
1970	The Most Deadly Game	Gabrielle	Episode: "Gabrielle"
1970	The F.B.I.	Karen Wandermere	Episode: "Time Bomb"
1971	Getting Together	Sandra/Sandra Burke	2 episodes
1972	Jigsaw	Judy Morgan	Episode: "To Stalk the Night"
1973	The Girl with Something Extra	Linda Fowler	Episode: "John & Sally & Fred & Linda"
1973	Hawkins	Connie Hawkins	Episode: "Blood Feud"
1974	Medical Center	Colin	Episode: "Appointment with Danger"
1974	Harry O	Marilyn Sidwell	Episode: "Shadows at Noon"
1975	Archer		Episode: "Shades of Blue"
1975	Petrocelli	Dusty	Episode: "Death Ride"
1975	Police Story	Claire Montrose	Episode: "Little Boy Lost"
1975	Matt Helm	Amy Farrah	Episode: "Think Murder"
1977	The Rockford Files	Girl in Tub	Episode: "Dirty Money, Black Light"
1977	Washington: Behind Closed Doors	Kathy Ferris	TV miniseries (6 episodes)
