= Knife for the Ladies =

1974 film

- Theatrical release poster
- Directed by: Larry G. Spangler
- Written by: George Arthur Bloom; Seton I. Miller; Robert Shelton
- Produced by: Steve Bono; Stan Jolley; Larry G. Spangler
- Starring: Jack Elam; Ruth Roman; Gene Evans
- Cinematography: Irving Lippman
- Edited by: Lettie Odney
- Production companies: Bryanston Pictures; Spangler / Jolley Productions
- Distributed by: Bryanston Distributing
- Release date: May 1974
- Running time: 86 minutes
- Country: United States
- Language: English

Knife for the Ladies is a 1974 American Western horror film directed by Larry G. Spangler and starring Jack Elam, Ruth Roman and Gene Evans. It was the first production from the company Bryanston Pictures.

== Plot ==
A private detective, Burns, is hired to travel out west to an Arizona town to investigate the murders of several prostitutes, each killed with a knife. The town has already lynched a local horse trader for the murders on the word of a small boy, Seth. Once there he meets a disgraced "two-fisted" sheriff, a sullen undertaker, and the local heiress. After proving the trader was innocent, Burns comes to terms with the sheriff, and they begin to work together. A number of subplots ensue: Burns and the sheriff shoot the man responsible for the lynching, the mortician blackmails the heiress to preserve her secret, and they discover that the heiress is using her arsenic to treat syphilis. The main plot is resolved with a surprise reveal, and Burns, the Sheriff, and his niece Jenny leave town on the next stagecoach out of town.

== Cast ==
- Jack Elam as Sheriff Jarrod
- Ruth Roman as Elizabeth
- Jeff Cooper as Burns
- John Kellogg as Hollyfield
- Gene Evans as Hooker
- Richard Schaal as Ainslie
- Diana Ewing as Jenny
- Derek Sanderson as Lute
- Jon Spangler as Seth
- Peter Athas as Travis

== Reception ==
James Evans from Starburst magazine rated the film four out of ten stars writing, "A Knife for the Ladies isn't a great western nor is it a good horror movie but it has its charms."
