= Triskellion (series) =

Triskellion is a trilogy of children's fantasy novels written by Mark Billingham and Peter Cocks, under the pseudonym Will Peterson. There are three books in the series entitled; Triskellion, Triskellion: The Burning and Triskellion: The Gathering. The first book was released in February 2008, the second in May 2009, and the third in March 2010.

The books are all categorized as Fiction: Action & Adventure; Family; Fantasy & Magic; Paranormal, and are young adult novels. All three books were published by Candlewick Press.
