= List of The Doris Day Show episodes =

The Doris Day Show is an American sitcom created by James Fritzell that aired on CBS from September 24, 1968, to March 12, 1973.

== Series overview ==
Season	Episodes	Originally released	
Season	Episodes	First released	Last released
1	28	September 24, 1968	April 29, 1969
2	26	September 22, 1969	April 6, 1970
3	26	September 14, 1970	April 27, 1971
4	24	September 13, 1971	March 6, 1972
5	24	September 11, 1972	March 12, 1973

== Episodes ==
=== Season 1 (1968–69) ===
No. overall	No. in season	Title	Directed by	Written by	Original release date
1	1	"Dinner for Mom"	Bob Sweeney	Dick Bensfield & Perry Grant	September 24, 1968
Billy and Toby want to treat their mother, Doris, to a birthday dinner at a fancy restaurant and pay for it themselves.
2	2	"The Uniform"	Bruce Bilson	Sidney Morse	October 1, 1968
When Billy makes the baseball team, Toby is jealous of the attention he is getting, so Toby lies and says he joined the school choir.
3	3	"The Friend"	Bob Sweeney	E. Duke Vincent & Bruce Johnson	October 8, 1968
4	4	"The Matchmakers"	Bruce Bilson	Richard Baer	October 22, 1968
5	5	"The Songwriter"	Gary Nelson	Joseph Bonaduce	October 29, 1968
6	6	"The Antique"	Bob Sweeney	Dorothy Cooper Foote	November 12, 1968
7	7	"Leroy B. Simpson"	Bob Sweeney	Sidney Morse	November 19, 1968
8	8	"The Black Eye"	Bob Sweeney	Ray Singer	November 26, 1968
9	9	"The Librarian"	Bruce Bilson	Harry Winkler	December 3, 1968
10	10	"The Camping Trip"	Bruce Bilson	Jerry Devine	December 10, 1968
11	11	"The Job"	Bob Sweeney	James L. Brooks	December 17, 1968
12	12	"Buck's Girl"	Gary Nelson	Carl Kleinschmitt	December 24, 1968
13	13	"The Relatives"	Harry Falk	Bruce Howard	December 31, 1968
14	14	"Love a Duck"	Gary Nelson	Jerry Devine	January 7, 1969
15	15	"Let Them Out of the Nest"	Bruce Bilson	Peggy Elliott & Ed Scharlach	January 21, 1969
16	16	"The Clock"	Bruce Bilson	Joseph Bonaduce	January 28, 1969
17	17	"The Buddy"	Gary Nelson	Harry Winkler	February 4, 1969
18	18	"The Flyboy"	Gary Nelson	Howard Leeds	February 11, 1969
19	19	"The Tournament"	Bruce Bilson	Dick Bensfield & Perry Grant	February 18, 1969
20	20	"Love Thy Neighbor"	Harry Falk	Sidney Morse	March 4, 1969
21	21	"The Con Man"	Bruce Bilson	Si Rose	March 11, 1969
22	22	"The Musical"	Bruce Bilson	Sidney Morse	March 18, 1969
23	23	"The Baby Sitter"	Harry Falk	Bruce Howard	March 25, 1969
24	24	"The Still"	Gary Nelson	Lloyd Turner & Whitey Mitchell	April 1, 1969
25	25	"The Gift"	Harry Falk	Arthur Alsberg & Don Nelson	April 8, 1969
26	26	"The Tiger"	Gary Nelson	Norman Katkov	April 15, 1969
27	27	"The Date"	Bruce Bilson	E. Duke Vincent & Bruce Johnson	April 22, 1969
28	28	"The Five Dollar Bill"	Gary Nelson	John McGreevey	April 29, 1969

=== Season 2 (1969–70) ===
No. overall	No. in season	Title	Directed by	Written by	Original release date
29	1	"Doris Gets a Job"	Coby Ruskin	Jack Elinson & Norman Paul	September 22, 1969
30	2	"A Frog Called Harold"	Coby Ruskin	Budd Grossman	September 29, 1969
31	3	"Married for a Day"	Earl Bellamy	Jack Elinson & Norman Paul	October 6, 1969
32	4	"The Woman Hater"	Coby Ruskin	Budd Grossman	October 13, 1969
33	5	"The Chocolate Bar War"	Harry Falk	Jack Elinson & Norman Paul	October 20, 1969
34	6	"The Health King"	Coby Ruskin	Budd Grossman	November 10, 1969
35	7	"Doris, the Model"	Hal Cooper	Jack Elinson & Norman Paul	November 17, 1969
36	8	"Doris Strikes Out"	Coby Ruskin	Jack Elinson & Norman Paul	November 24, 1969
37	9	"Singles Only"	William Wiard	William Raynor & Myles Wilder	December 8, 1969
38	10	"Togetherness"	Alan Rafkin	William Raynor & Myles Wilder	December 15, 1969
39	11	"A Two-Family Christmas"	Lawrence Dobkin	Jack Elinson & Norman Paul	December 22, 1969
40	12	"You're as Old as You Feel"	Lawrence Dobkin	Jack Elinson & Norman Paul	December 29, 1969
41	13	"The Prizefighter and the Lady"	Denver Pyle	Budd Grossman	January 5, 1970
42	14	"Doris vs. the Computer"	Denver Pyle	Arthur Alsberg & Don Nelson	January 12, 1970
43	15	"Hot Dogs"	Coby Ruskin	Jack Elinson & Norman Paul & Don Genson	January 19, 1970
44	16	"Today's World Catches the Measles"	Fred de Cordova	Jack Elinson & Norman Paul	January 26, 1970
45	17	"The Gas Station"	Hal Cooper	Jack Elinson & Norman Paul & Don Genson	February 2, 1970
46	18	"Kidnapped"	Coby Ruskin	Douglas Tibbles	February 9, 1970
47	19	"Buck's Portrait"	Earl Bellamy	Douglas Tibbles	February 16, 1970
48	20	"Doris Hires a Millionaire: Part 1"	Fred de Cordova	Budd Grossman	February 23, 1970
49	21	"Doris Hires a Millionaire: Part 2"	Fred de Cordova	Jack Elinson & Norman Paul	March 2, 1970
50	22	"A Woman's Intuition"	Denver Pyle	Rick Mittleman	March 9, 1970
51	23	"Doris Meets a Prince"	Fred de Cordova	Budd Grossman	March 16, 1970
52	24	"The Duke Returns"	Denver Pyle	Jack Elinson & Norman Paul	March 23, 1970
53	25	"The Office Troubleshooter"	Coby Ruskin	Budd Grossman	March 30, 1970
54	26	"Colonel Fairburn Takes Over"	Coby Ruskin	Rick Mittleman	April 6, 1970

=== Season 3 (1970–71) ===
No. overall	No. in season	Title	Directed by	Written by	Original release date
55	1	"Doris Finds an Apartment"	Denver Pyle	Jack Elinson & Norman Paul	September 14, 1970
56	2	"The Feminist"	Denver Pyle	Jack Elinson & Norman Paul	September 21, 1970
57	3	"How Can I Ignore the Man Next Door?"	Denver Pyle	Budd Grossman	September 28, 1970
58	4	"Dinner for One"	Denver Pyle	Jack Elinson & Norman Paul	October 5, 1970
59	5	"Doris Leaves Today's World: Part 1"	Reza Badiyi	Jack Elinson & Norman Paul	October 12, 1970
60	6	"Doris Leaves Today's World: Part 2"	Reza Badiyi	Jack Elinson & Norman Paul	October 19, 1970
61	7	"The Fashion Show"	Reza Badiyi	Jack Elinson & Norman Paul	October 26, 1970
62	8	"Lost and Found"	William Wiard	Jack Elinson & Norman Paul	November 2, 1970
63	9	"Duke the Performer"	William Wiard	Fred S. Fox & Seaman Jacobs	November 9, 1970
64	10	"Doris the Spy"	Reza Badiyi	Budd Grossman	November 16, 1970
65	11	"Tony Bennett is Eating Here"	Reza Badiyi	Jack Elinson & Norman Paul	November 23, 1970
Doris interviews Tony Bennett.
66	12	"Cousin Charlie"	William Wiard	Budd Grossman	November 30, 1970
67	13	"Love Makes the Pizza Go Round"	William Wiard	Budd Grossman	December 7, 1970
68	14	"Buck Visits the Big City"	William Wiard	Budd Grossman	December 14, 1970
69	15	"It's Christmas Time in the City"	Denver Pyle	Jack Elinson & Norman Paul	December 21, 1970
70	16	"Doris vs. Pollution"	Denver Pyle	Jack Elinson & Norman Paul	December 28, 1970
71	17	"The Forward Pass"	William Wiard	Budd Grossman	January 11, 1971
72	18	"Duke's Girlfriend"	Peter Baldwin	Jack Elinson & Norman Paul	January 18, 1971
73	19	"Jarvis' Uncle"	William Wiard	Budd Grossman	January 25, 1971
74	20	"Lassoin' Leroy"	Peter Baldwin	Jack Elinson & Norman Paul	February 1, 1971
75	21	"Colonel Fairburn, Jr."	Lee Philips	Story by : Don Genson & Budd Grossman; Teleplay by : Budd Grossman	February 8, 1971
76	22	"Billy's First Date"	Lee Philips	Jack Elinson & Norman Paul	February 15, 1971
Doris argues with the father of Billy's first date.
77	23	"Doris Goes to Hollywood"	William Wiard	Jack Elinson, Don Genson & Norman Paul	February 22, 1971
Doris travels to Hollywood after winning a Doris Day look-alike contest.
78	24	"Skiing Anyone?"	Reza Badiyi	Jack Elinson & Norman Paul	March 1, 1971
79	25	"The Father-Son Weekend"	Reza Badiyi	Budd Grossman	March 8, 1971
80	26	"Young Love"	Norman Tokar	Bob Sand & Bruce Stertin	March 15, 1971

=== Season 4 (1971–72) ===
No. overall	No. in season	Title	Directed by	Written by	Original release date
81	1	"And Here's ... Doris"	Norman Tokar	Laurence Marks	September 13, 1971
82	2	"Mr. and Mrs. Raffles"	Norman Tokar	Arthur Julian	September 20, 1971
83	3	"When in Rome, Don't"	Jerry London	Richard M. Powell	September 27, 1971
84	4	"Charity Begins at the Office"	William Ward	Phil Sharp	October 4, 1971
85	5	"A Weighty Problem"	Bruce Bilson	Arthur Julian	October 11, 1971
86	6	"The People's Choice"	Jerry London	Arthur Julian	October 18, 1971
87	7	"A Fine Romance"	Norman Tokar	Laurence Marks	October 25, 1971
88	8	"The Albatross"	Irving J. Moore	Arthur Julian	November 1, 1971
89	9	"Have I Got a Fellow for You"	Bruce Bilson	Arthur Julian	November 8, 1971
90	10	"To England with Doris"	Lee Philips	Laurence Marks	November 15, 1971
91	11	"The Shiek of Araby"	Richard Kinon	Arthur Julian	November 22, 1971
92	12	"Doris and the Doctor"	William Ward	Laurence Marks	November 29, 1971
93	13	"Happiness is Not Being Fired"	Irving J. Moore	Arthur Julian	December 6, 1971
94	14	"Whodunnit, Doris?"	Marc Daniels	Gary Belkin	December 13, 1971
95	15	"The Wings of An Angel"	Richard Kinon	Richard M. Powell	December 27, 1971
96	16	"Doris at Sea"	Marc Daniels	Laurence Marks	January 3, 1972
97	17	"The Sorrow of Sanapur"	William Ward	Richard M. Powell	January 10, 1972
98	18	"The Blessed Event"	Bruce Bilson	Arthur Julian	January 17, 1972
99	19	"Who's Got the Trenchcoat?"	William Ward	Don Genson	January 24, 1972
100	20	"Doris's House Guest"	Bruce Bilson	Arthur Julian	January 31, 1972
101	21	"The Crapshooter Who Would Be King"	Edward H. Feldman	Richard M. Powell	February 7, 1972
102	22	"Cover Girl"	William Ward	Laurence Marks	February 21, 1972
103	23	"Gowns by Louie"	William Ward	Arthur Julian	February 28, 1972
104	24	"There's a Horse Thief in Every Family Tree"	Norman Tokar	Phil Sharp	March 6, 1972

=== Season 5 (1972–73) ===
No. overall	No. in season	Title	Directed by	Written by	Original release date
105	1	"No More Advice ... Please"	Marc Daniels	Laurence Marks	September 11, 1972
106	2	"The Great Talent Raid"	William Ward	William Raynor & Myles Wilder	September 18, 1972
107	3	"Just a Miss Understanding"	Lee Philips	Charlotte Brown	September 25, 1972
108	4	"The Press Secretary"	Richard Kinon	Laurence Marks	October 2, 1972
109	5	"Peeping Tom"	Marc Daniels	Arthur Julian	October 9, 1972
110	6	"Forgive and Forget"	William Ward	Laurence Marks	October 16, 1972
111	7	"Debt of Honor"	Peter Lawford	Phil Sharp	October 23, 1972
112	8	"Jimmy the Gent"	Marc Daniels	Laurie Samara & Courtney Andrews	November 6, 1972
113	9	"The Music Man"	William Ward	Laurence Marks	November 13, 1972
114	10	"Detective Story"	Richard Kinon	Charlotte Brown	November 20, 1972
115	11	"The Co-Op"	Roger Duchowny	Arthur Julian	November 27, 1972
116	12	"Anniversary Gift"	Roger Duchowny	Arthur Julian	December 11, 1972
117	13	"The New Boss"	Marc Daniels	Laurence Marks	December 18, 1972
118	14	"Follow That Dog"	William Ward	William Raynor & Myles Wilder	January 1, 1973
119	15	"The Hoax"	Lee Philips	Laurence Marks	January 8, 1973
120	16	"The Last Huzzah"	Richard Kinon	Arthur Julian	January 15, 1973
121	17	"Hospital Benefit"	Roger Duchowny	Laurence Marks	January 22, 1973
Doris' romance with Dr. Lawrence is in jeopardy when she meets her competition.
122	18	"It's a Dog's Life"	Roger Duchowny	Arthur Julian	January 29, 1973
123	19	"Family Magazine"	Lee Philips	Don Genson & Laurence Marks	February 5, 1973
124	20	"A Small Cure for Big Alimony"	Lee Philips	Arthur Julian	February 12, 1973
125	21	"The Magnificent Fraud"	Marc Daniels	William Raynor & Myles Wilder	February 19, 1973
126	22	"Meant for Each Other"	Roger Duchowny	Laurie Samara & Courtney Andrews	February 26, 1973
127	23	"Welcome to Big Sur"	Wiliam Ward	William Raynor & Myles Wilder	March 5, 1973
128	24	"Byline ... Alias Doris"	William Ward	Laurence Marks	March 12, 1973
