= Triskelion Arts =

Triskelion Arts is a non-profit arts presenting organization founded in 2000, which includes two theaters and rehearsal studios in Greenpoint, Brooklyn. Triskelion Arts features artists from the concert dance, comedy, improvisation, Butoh and clowning communities, “where young companies can afford to self-produce and where choreographers can take a chance.” ^{[3]}

In the last five years, Triskelion Arts has presented the work of over 750 artists featuring nearly 3,500 performers through its programs, including companies such as cakeface, Dante Brown/Warehouse Dance, Elisa Monte Dance, Launch Movement Experiment, Peter Kyle Dance, Stefanie Nelson Dancegroup, Tami Stronach Dance, Jessica Gaynor Dance, Raja Feather Kelly | the feath3r theory, Shannon Gillen & Guests, Vangeline Theater, to name a few.

== History ==
The performance art space began in 2000 and was conceived by the collective, KICK STAND DANCE. In 2005, one of its founders, Abby Bender, and colleague Andy Dickerson succeeded the collective and have operated the organization ever since. Under their direction, Triskelion Arts had grown from one studio/theater to five spaces in the landmarked Hecla Iron Works factory in Williamsburg, Brooklyn. In 2015, Triskelion Arts moved to Greenpoint, Brooklyn.

== Facility ==
Triskelion Arts’ main stage space is the Muriel Schulman Theater, which is an 88-seat black-box theater with accompanying dressing room located behind the stage.

Additionally, there is the Douglas Elliman Studio Theater, a 40-seat studio theater for less formal showings.

Both theaters, along with two other smaller studios, have sprung floors and function as spaces for rehearsals, classes and auditions. Triskelion Arts has provided well over 200,000 rehearsal and class hours to artists working in a variety of disciplines between 2000 and 2016.

== Programming ==
Triskelion Arts has a robust and diverse curated programming series, and also allows individuals and groups to rent the space to self-produce.

The Split Bill series presents artists for two-night runs. The program's intention is to serve emerging artists who are looking for a stepping-stone between the showcase format (for which work is generally capped at 25 minutes) and full-on, evening-length, self-production.

The Collaborations in Dance Festival (CollabFest) runs in the fall presenting 20-30 artists or companies over 4 nights in movement-based work that features a strong collaboration with other mediums such as film, music, theater and visual arts.

Never Before, Never Again is an improvisation festival that runs in the winter presenting 20-30 artists or companies over 4 nights, which was featured in the Brooklyn Paper.

The Comedy in Dance Festival runs in the spring presenting 20-30 artists or companies over 4 nights. Past performers have included Billy Schultz, the Cocoon Central Dance Team which includes Sunita Mani, Tallie Medel and Eleanore Pienta; Jamie Benson and Andrae Gonzalo and The Raving Jaynes, among others.

The Summer Shake-Up runs mid-week in the summer presenting both invited and submission-based work up to 15 minutes.

The Dance Film Feastival, which is co-sponsored by Dance Films Association in 2016, runs in the spring highlighting the complex relationship between choreographer and filmmaker. The festival celebrates national and international dance-based films that stretch the boundaries of what would be possible on the stage.

Beyond presenting application-based works, the organization predominantly hosts MainStage "Triskelion Arts Presents" solo or 2 company shared shows, which are by invitation only. Interested companies are encouraged to make introductions.

== Acclaim/Press ==
- In August 2019, Triskelion Arts was recognized by the city for their outstanding work in their communities with an official citation and the seal of their borough.
- Artistic Director Abby Bender was named as one of The 100 Most Influential People in Brooklyn Culture in March 2014 by Brooklyn Magazine
- “…Triskelion is a wonderfully old-fashioned, alternative rehearsal and performance space with a long tradition of hosting rising choreographers. There are too few of these spaces left in New York City, places where young companies can afford to self-produce, where choreographers can take a chance.” Carrie Stern, The Brooklyn Eagle, February 2012
- “But the sweat and blood was worth it—the new Triskelion building looks grand. It boasts a large theater that comfortably seats up to ninety; high ceilings throughout; bathrooms on both floors; three rehearsal rooms with big windows facing the street; a neat little office; and an outdoor courtyard recently planted with roses.” Ona Abelis, greenpointers.com, May 2015.
- Triskelion Art’s Move on The Dance Enthusiast
- Triskelion's 7th Annual Comedy in Dance Festival was included in The Village Voice’s Voice Choice
- Cocoon Central Dance Team’s performance at Triskelion Arts was a Top NYC Comedy Choice in January 2015
- "Eight Reasons cakeface’s 'Harold, I Hate You' Is Your New Favorite Downtown Dance/Theater Piece" (seen at Triskelion Arts), CultureBot, Ryan Weirr, May 2015.
- “Watching Shannon Gillen + Guests perform 'A Colored Image of the Sun' means being struck over and over by the human ability to achieve the sublime.” Kristen Iverson of the L Magazine, January 2013.
- “Mari Meade and dancers work continually to create and refine new pieces, and that work shows, in this world is not my home. It's silly, violent and sweet, an unusual combination.” Quinn Baston of Off Off Off, September 2015.
- “How can you not grin, or laugh hysterically (as much of the audience did) as he pulls a drill out to carve sticks that become his dancers, and then at the end of the show, magically, a fully jointed foot. Ward is thoroughly engaging, a seasoned performer…” Deirdre Towers, The Dance Enthusiast, May 2015.
- “Butoh, which emerged in The 1960s, is still in its adolescence as a dance form. With collaborations such as what Vangeline and Mr. Nosan have devised, I think it is safe to say that the work will continue to evolve attractively and certainly intriguingly.” Juan Michael Porter II, Broadway World, April 2016.

== Sources of Funding ==
Government and foundation support for Triskelion Arts is provided by: New York City Department of Cultural Affairs, Howard Gilman Foundation, The Mertz Gilmore Foundation, New York State Council on the Arts and Harkness Foundation for Dance. This organization has also received past funding from Andrew W. Mellon Foundation, the 2012 JPMorgan Chase Regrant Program, administered by Brooklyn Arts Council (BAC) and participated in the WNYC STAR Initiative in 2011 .
