= The Gamesters of Triskelion =

- Star Trek: The Original Series episode
- The arena floor is a triskelion
- Episode no.: Season 2 Episode 16
- Directed by: Gene Nelson
- Written by: Margaret Armen
- Cinematography by: Jerry Finnerman
- Production code: 046
- Original air date: January 5, 1968

Guest appearances
- Dick Crockett – Andorian Thrall; Victoria George – Ensign Jana Haines; Mickey Morton – Kloog; Angelique Pettyjohn – Shahna; Jane Ross – Tamoon; Joseph Ruskin – Master Thrall Galt; Steve Sandor – Lars; Roger Holloway – Lt. Lemli; Frank da Vinci – Lt. Brent; Bartell LaRue – Provider #1; Eddie Paskey – Lt. Leslie; William Blackburn – Lt. Hadley; Walker Edmiston – Provider #2; Robert Johnson – Provider #3

Episode chronology
← Previous "The Trouble with Tribbles"	Next → "A Piece of the Action"
- Star Trek: The Original Series season 2

"The Gamesters of Triskelion" is the sixteenth episode of the second season of the American science fiction television series Star Trek. Written by Margaret Armen and directed by Gene Nelson, it was first broadcast January 5, 1968.

In the episode, Captain Kirk and his companions are abducted into slavery and trained to fight as gladiators for the gambling entertainment of three disembodied beings.

== Plot ==
The Federation starship Enterprise inspects an unmanned station at Gamma II. Captain Kirk, Communications Officer Lieutenant Uhura and navigator Ensign Chekov attempt to transport, but disappear before the system activates. Commander Spock orders a search for them and discovers an ion trail.

Kirk, Uhura, and Chekov find themselves in a gladiator arena on a strange planet. They are attacked by four humanoids and subdued. Galt, Master Thrall of Triskelion, informs them that they will be trained in games to entertain his masters, the Providers. Each is fitted with a "collar of obedience" that engages when they disobey Galt's orders. Uhura, Chekov, and Kirk are assigned individual "drill thralls": Lars, Tamoon, and Shahna, respectively. After a period of training, the Providers bid for the new thralls in their currency, "quatloos".

While running among ancient ruins outside the arena, Kirk tries to gain information about the Providers from Shahna, but her collar is activated when she speaks too freely. Kirk protests that he should have been the one punished, and when they are returned to their cells, Shahna expresses her appreciation for this. When she moves to embrace him, Kirk knocks her unconscious, and uses her key to free himself, Uhura, and Chekov, but they are stopped by Galt.

The Enterprise follows the ion trail, finding a planet with a humanoid settlement. As Spock and Chief Medical Officer Dr. McCoy prepare to beam down, the voice of Provider One warns them not to transport. Kirk's voice is also heard, and he brings them up to date. Kirk challenges the Providers to show themselves and finds himself in an underground chamber; The Providers are three disembodied brains. Kirk offers them a wager: he and his two officers will fight an equal number of thralls. If Kirk and his party win, the Providers will teach the thralls to govern themselves. If they lose, the Enterprise crew will become thralls. Kirk embarrasses them by saying, "How is it that humans can teach primitive cultures, but the providers say they cannot do it?" The Providers agree, stipulating that Kirk must battle three thralls alone.

As the Enterprise crew watches from the ship, Kirk kills two thralls and injures a third. Galt sends in Shahna. Kirk subdues her, and she surrenders. The Providers declare that Kirk has won the wager and unlock the thralls' collars. Shahna expresses a desire to follow Kirk to the stars, but he answers that she and the other thralls must first learn to live in their newfound freedom.

== Cultural impact ==
The duel was parodied in the Simpsons episode "Deep Space Homer", with onlooking NASA scientists wagering quatloos as Homer Simpson fights Barney Gumble in an arena as the Trek battle theme plays.

Kirk's speech to Shahna about love was referenced in the South Park episode "Hooked on Monkey Fonics". The scene in the South Park episode is taken from this episode of Star Trek "complete with similar incidental music".

The popular Star Trek catchphrase "Beam me up, Scotty" is a common misquotation, with The Oxford Dictionary of Quotations stating that the nearest equivalent is the phrase uttered in this episode: "Scotty, beam us up."

== Television studies ==
The episode has been mentioned and discussed in a number of works of television studies. In Batman Unmasked: Analyzing a Cultural Icon (2013), the episode is compared to the "Green Ice/Deep Freeze" episode pairing in the 1960s Batman television series. "The Gamesters of Triskelion" is also described in Modern Amazons: Warrior Women on Screen (2006), with the character Shahna dressed in "traditional Amazonian attire" and the episode being given as an example of female domination. The authors also observe that the episode was one of the minority of Star Trek episodes in the original series written by a woman (17 of its 79 episodes were written or co-written by women) and that Margaret Armen was a "veteran of warrior women shows like Wonder Woman and The Big Valley", although Armen's lone Wonder Woman episode dates from several years after Star Trek ceased production.

The themes of religion and philosophy in this episode are discussed in Robert Asa's detailed critique of the Star Trek episode "Who Mourns for Adonais?" Asa notes that god-figures, such as those featured in "The Gamesters of Triskelion," are "consistently disappointing, decadent and/or dangerous" and that specifically the Providers of Triskelion use "humanoids as playthings for personal amusement". The episode "The Gamesters of Triskelion" is cited by prolific American literary and media critic Paul A. Cantor as an example of decadent outcomes for terminal societies.

== Production details ==
It was produced after John Meredyth Lucas had taken over for Gene L. Coon as the program's line producer at the latter's request. Gerald Perry "Jerry" Finnerman was the director of photography for the installment, and his cinematography protégé, Al Francis, was chief camera operator.

The episode was originally titled "The Gamesters of Pentathlan". The original script called for Sulu instead of Chekov, but George Takei was away filming The Green Berets at the time.

== Reception ==
In 2017, Den of Geek ranked this episode as the 12th "best worst" Star Trek episode of the original series, noting its entertainment value.

In 2016, TVline ranked this as having one of the top twenty moments of Star Trek, when Kirk not only spares the life of his defeated opponent, but also convinces the alien authority to allow a free society.
