= The Paradise Syndrome =

- Star Trek: The Original Series episode
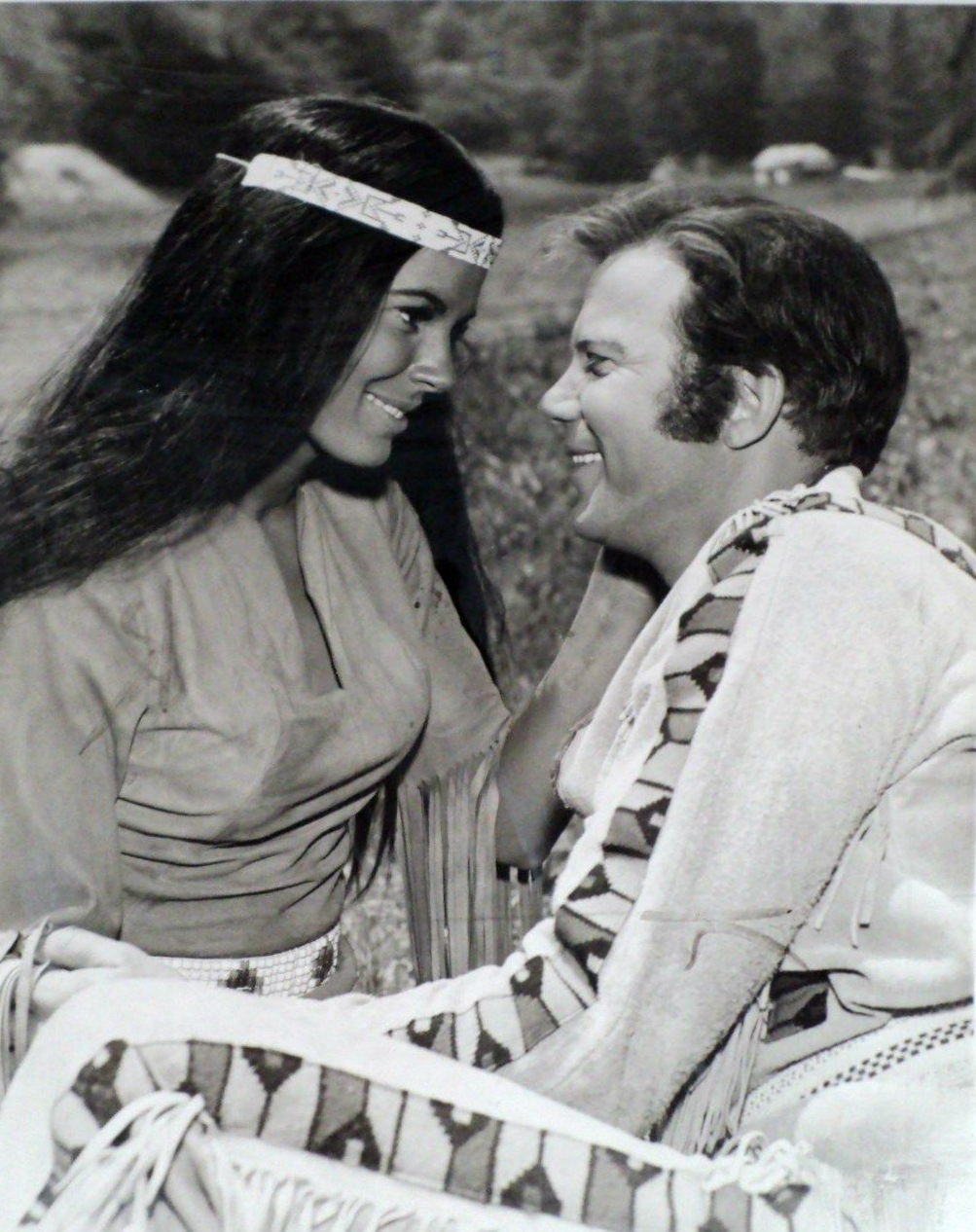
- Captain Kirk with Miramanee
- Episode no.: Season 3 Episode 3
- Directed by: Jud Taylor
- Written by: Margaret Armen
- Cinematography by: Jerry Finnerman
- Production code: 058
- Original air date: October 4, 1968

Guest appearances
- Sabrina Scharf – Miramanee; Rudy Solari – Salish; Richard Hale – Goro; Naomi Pollack – Indian Woman; John Lindesmith – Engineer; Peter Virgo, Jr. – Warrior; Lamont Laird – Indian Boy; William Blackburn – Lt. Hadley; Roger Holloway – Lt. Lemli

Episode chronology
← Previous "The Enterprise Incident"	Next → "And the Children Shall Lead"
- Star Trek: The Original Series season 3

"The Paradise Syndrome" is the third episode of the third season of the American science fiction television series Star Trek. Written by Margaret Armen and directed by Jud Taylor, it was first broadcast October 4, 1968.

In the episode, an alien device on a primitive planet erases Captain Kirk's memory, and he begins a new life with the planet's indigenous people modeled on Native Americans.

== Plot ==
Captain Kirk, First Officer Spock and Chief Medical Officer Dr. McCoy transport to the surface of an Earth-like planet, from which they are to deflect an approaching asteroid. They discover an obelisk with strange markings, and observe a settlement whose inhabitants, according to Spock, are descended from Native Americans (Mohican, Navaho and Delaware). Kirk, while out of sight of the others, falls through a trap door into the obelisk, where a beam shocks him into unconsciousness. Spock and McCoy are unable to locate Kirk and return to the Federation starship USS Enterprise to complete their mission.

Kirk awakens with amnesia, and a pair of women, including Miramanee, the tribal priestess, see Kirk emerge from their "temple." He is hailed as a god, and taken back to their village, where the tribal elders demand proof of Kirk's divinity. At that moment, a drowned boy is brought in. Salish, the medicine chief, declares the child dead, but Kirk uses mouth-to-mouth resuscitation to revive him. The elders accept Kirk as a god, forcing Salish to relinquish his position to Kirk.

In the meantime Spock, taking command of the Enterprise, drives her at maximum warp speed to beat the approaching asteroid to the deflection point. However, having pushed the engines well beyond their normal limits, there is not much energy left to deflect the asteroid. The ship's deflectors result in a change of only 0.0013 degrees in its course, which Mr. Sulu tells Spock is insufficient to avert collision with the planet. An attempt to cleave the asteroid like a diamond using the ship's phasers fails, and the attempt damages the warp drive beyond Scotty's ability to repair. Having exhausted their options, the Enterprise heads back to the planet on impulse power to attempt to recover Captain Kirk and devise another solution to the asteroid problem. The trip will take 59 days and according to Mr. Spock, "that asteroid will be four hours behind us all the way."

Following the tradition that the tribe priestess and medicine chief marry, Miramanee rejects Salish for Kirk. Kirk falls deeper in love with Miramanee, though haunted at night by dreams of people he feels he should be with. Miramanee happily tells Kirk that she is pregnant.

As the Enterprise nears the planet, Spock succeeds in partially deciphering the markings on the obelisk. It is an asteroid deflector built by the "Preservers", an ancient race that resettled various endangered humanoid populations on other planets in order to ensure their survival. Spock surmises that the deflector has malfunctioned.

As the asteroid nears the planet, the sky darkens, thunder roars, and strong winds blow. The elders tell Kirk he must go into the temple to stop the storm. As Kirk pounds fruitlessly on the side of the obelisk, demanding that it open for him, the tribe turns against him. They begin stoning him and Miramanee. Spock and McCoy materialize, frightening the villagers away. Spock uses a mind meld to retrieve Kirk's memories, while McCoy tends to Miramanee's wounds. Kirk is able to open the trap door into the "temple" by speaking the correct tones to open it, and Spock activates the deflector with minutes to spare. McCoy tells Kirk that Miramanee will not survive. She dies in his arms, and he grieves.

== Production ==
Paramount Television daily production reports record that this episode was filmed on Paramount’s Gower stages on June 11, 17 and 18, 1968, and at the Upper Franklin Canyon Reservoir, California, for the planet scenes on June 12–14, 1968.

== Reception ==
Author Jon Davidson on his sci-fi tv and movie website rated this episode 7 out of 10, noting "while the presence of Native Americans on yet another parallel Earth planet is only briefly explained, 'The Paradise Syndrome' provides a compelling romance subplot to compensate for any questionable science fiction aspects."

In 2015, Wired magazine suggested this episode was skippable in their binge-watching guide for the original series.

In 2017, Screen Rant rated the love story between Kirk and Miramanee as the sixth best love story in Star Trek.

In 2019, Nerdist included this episode on their "Best of Kirk" binge-watching guide.

In 2024 Hollywood.com ranked "The Paradise Syndrome" at number 74 out of the 79 original series episodes.

== Releases ==
This episode was released in Japan on December 21, 1993 as part of the complete season 3 LaserDisc set, Star Trek: Original Series log.3. A trailer for this and the other episodes was also included, and the episode had English and Japanese audio tracks.

This episode was included in TOS Season 3 remastered DVD box set, with the remastered version of this episode.
