= Daniel Arthur Smith =

Science fiction author

- Born: September 14, 1968 (age 57)
- Occupation: Writer
- Website: danielarthursmith.com

Daniel Arthur Smith (born September 14, 1968) is an American science fiction author. His titles include Spectral Shift, Hugh Howey Lives, The Cathari Treasure, The Somali Deception, and a few other novels and short stories. He also curates the short fiction series Tales from the Canyons of the Damned and Frontiers of Speculative Fiction.

As part of the Dominion Rising collection of selected titles his novel Spectral Shift hit number 14 on the USA Today Best Seller list and number 4 on the Wall Street Journal Best Seller list.

== Personal life ==
Daniel has traveled to over 300 cities in 22 countries, residing in Los Angeles, Kalamazoo, Prague, Crete, and now writes in Manhattan where he lives with his wife and sons.

== Bibliography ==
=== Novels and novellas ===
- The Potter's Daughter (May 2013)
- Agroland (October 2014)
- Hugh Howey Lives (April 2015)

==== The Cameron Kincaid Adventures ====
- The Cathari Treasure (November 2012)
- The Somali Deception (December 2013)

==== Spectral Worlds ====
- Spectral Shift (August 2017)

==== Spectral Worlds short stories ====
- The Off World Kick Murder Squad I from Tales from the Canyons of the Damned No. 11 (December 2016)
- The Off World Kick Murder Squad II from Tales from the Canyons of the Damned No. 12 (January 2017)
- The Off World Kick Murder Squad III from Tales from the Canyons of the Damned No. 14 (February 2017)
- Lorem Tempus from Tales from the Canyons of the Damned No. 16 (June 2017)
- Carcerem from UnCommon Lands (August 2017)

==== The Lost Tapes short stories ====
- The Lost Tapes–Beckett Ridge from Tales from the Canyons of the Damned No. 10 (October 2016)
- The Lost Tapes–Jack Carter from Tales from the Canyons of the Damned No. 17 (June 2017)
- The Lost Tapes–Sirens of Bartholomew from Tales from the Canyons of the Damned No. 18 (August 2017)
- The Lost Tapes–The Madness of King Street from Tales from the Canyons of the Damned No. 19 (September 2017)

=== Other short stories ===
- Opening Day (August 2013)
- Sarfer (May 2015)
- Sandhogs (October 2015)
- The Penthouse (October 2015)
- The Harbor (October 2015)
- Tower (November 2015)
- The Diatomic Quantum Flop (November 2015)
- Tesla (November 2015)
- The Blue Orb (November 2015)
- From the Inside (November 2015)
- The Peralta Protocol (March 2016)
- The Tombs (April 2016)
- Eye in the Sky (April 2016)
- Confessional Part I (May 2016)
- Confessional Part II (May 2016)
- Confessional Part III (May 2016)
- Like No Other (May 2016)
- The Park (May 2016)
- The Least Child (June 2016)
- The Don (July 2016)
- Times Square Elmo (August 2016)
- Back to Brooklyn (September 2016)
- The Pirate (October 2016)
- The Enemy Beyond the Walls (January 2017)
- Angel's Catch (February 2017)
- The Vulture Bus (March 2017)
- The Titan’s Daughter (September 2017)

=== As editor ===
==== Frontiers of Speculative Fiction ====
- CLONES: The Anthology (May 2016, with Jessica West)
- OCEANS: The Anthology (September 2017, with Jessica West)

==== Tales from the Canyons of the Damned ====
- Tales from the Canyons of the Damned No. 1 (October 2015)
- Tales from the Canyons of the Damned No. 2 (November 2015)
- Tales from the Canyons of the Damned No. 3 (April 2016)
- Tales from the Canyons of the Damned No. 4 (April 2016)
- Tales from the Canyons of the Damned No. 5 (May 2016)
- Tales from the Canyons of the Damned No. 6 (July 2016)
- Tales from the Canyons of the Damned No. 7 (August 2016)
- Tales from the Canyons of the Damned No. 8 (September 2016)
- Tales from the Canyons of the Damned No. 9 (October 2016)
- Tales from the Canyons of the Damned No. 10 (October 2016)
- Tales from the Canyons of the Damned No. 11 (December 2016)
- Tales from the Canyons of the Damned No. 12 (January 2017)
- Tales from the Canyons of the Damned No. 13 (February 2017)
- Tales from the Canyons of the Damned No. 14 (February 2017)
- Tales from the Canyons of the Damned No. 15 (March 2017)
- Tales from the Canyons of the Damned No. 16 (June 2017)
- Tales from the Canyons of the Damned No. 17 (June 2017)
- Tales from the Canyons of the Damned No. 18 (August 2017)
- Tales from the Canyons of the Damned No. 19 (September 2017)
- Tales from the Canyons of the Damned No. 20 (November 2017)
- Tales from the Canyons of the Damned No. 21 (January 2018)
- Tales from the Canyons of the Damned No. 22 (February 2018)
- Tales from the Canyons of the Damned No. 23 (April 2018)
- Tales from the Canyons of the Damned No. 24 (May 2018)
- Tales from the Canyons of the Damned No. 25 (June 2018)
- Tales from the Canyons of the Damned No. 26 (August 2018)
- Tales from the Canyons of the Damned No. 27 (October 2018)
- Tales from the Canyons of the Damned No. 28 (November 2018)
- Tales from the Canyons of the Damned No. 29 (December 2018)
- Tales from the Canyons of the Damned No. 30 (January 2019)
- Tales from the Canyons of the Damned No. 31 (February 2019)
- Tales from the Canyons of the Damned No. 32 (April 2019)
- Tales from the Canyons of the Damned No. 33 (May 2019)
- Tales from the Canyons of the Damned No. 34 (June 2019)
- Tales from the Canyons of the Damned No. 35 (October 2019)
- Tales from the Canyons of the Damned No. 36 (December 2019)

=== Collected editions ===
- Tales from the Canyons of the Damned Omnibus No. 1 (July 2016)
- Tales from the Canyons of the Damned Omnibus No. 2 (November 2016)
- Tales from the Canyons of the Damned Omnibus No. 3 (April 2017)
- Tales from the Canyons of the Damned Omnibus No. 4 (August 2017)

=== Interviews ===
- Q&A With Science Fiction Author Daniel Arthur Smith – The Fussy Librarian - January 2016
- 10 Questions With Daniel Arthur Smith – The Leighgendarium - January 2016
- Episode 30 with Daniel Arthur Smith – The Leighgendarium- December 2016
- Episode thirty four with Daniel Arthur Smith – The Author Stories Podcast - April 2015
- Episode 109: Daniel Arthur Smith Talks Writing Pulp – The Author Stories Podcast - June 2016
- Episode 227 OCEANS: The Anthology Special with Rysa Walker and Daniel Arthur Smith – The Author Stories Podcast - September 2017
