= Blood Oath (Star Trek: Deep Space Nine) =

- Star Trek: Deep Space Nine episode
- Episode no.: Season 2 Episode 19
- Directed by: Winrich Kolbe
- Story by: Peter Allan Fields; Andrea Moore Alton (Idea)
- Teleplay by: Peter Allan Fields
- Cinematography by: Marvin Rush
- Production code: 439
- Original air date: March 28, 1994
- Running time: 45:27

Guest appearances
- John Colicos as Kor; William Campbell as Koloth; Michael Ansara as Kang; Bill Bolender as The Albino; Christopher Collins as Assistant

Episode chronology
← Previous "Profit and Loss"	Next → "The Maquis, Part I"
- Star Trek: Deep Space Nine season 2

"Blood Oath" is the 19th episode of the second season of the American science fiction television series Star Trek: Deep Space Nine, and originally aired on March 27, 1994 in broadcast syndication. The story was created by Peter Allan Fields and the episode was directed by Winrich Kolbe. The choreography of the ending fight scene was created by Dan Curry and Dennis Madalone, while the score was created by Dennis McCarthy.

Set in the 24th century, the series follows the adventures on Deep Space Nine, a space station located near a stable wormhole between the Alpha and Gamma quadrants of the Milky Way Galaxy, in orbit of the planet Bajor. In this episode, three legendary Klingon warriors come to the station to meet with Jadzia Dax (Terry Farrell), before embarking on a crusade of vengeance.

The episode featured the return of John Colicos, William Campbell and Michael Ansara to the Klingon roles of Kor, Koloth and Kang, respectively. Each of those actors had previously portrayed the roles in episodes of the original Star Trek series. The story was based on the films Seven Samurai and The Magnificent Seven, and scenes were filmed on location in Pasadena, California, as well as on sound stages at Paramount Studios. The episode was watched by 8.4 million viewers, and the opinions of critics were mixed.

== Plot ==
Security Chief Odo (René Auberjonois) is having a succession of problems with Klingons. First, Quark (Armin Shimerman) complains about an elderly drunken Klingon monopolizing a holosuite. Odo removes the man, Kor (John Colicos), and takes him to a holding cell. A short time later, another Klingon, Koloth (William Campbell), comes to release Kor, but storms out when he sees how drunk he is. Jadzia Dax (Terry Farrell) overhears their names and realizes why they have come, which is confirmed when they are joined by a third Klingon, Kang (Michael Ansara). Eighty-one years ago, the three Klingons destroyed the power base of a pirate leader known as "The Albino" (Bill Bolender). The pirate retaliated by infecting each of their firstborn sons with a deadly virus. Curzon Dax, a close friend of the three Klingons, was godfather to Kang's murdered son, and the four of them swore a Klingon "blood oath" to find and kill the Albino. Now, Kang says he has finally found him.

Jadzia confides in Major Kira Nerys (Nana Visitor) that she feels obligated to pursue Curzon's oath, but Kira warns her about what killing someone will do to her. Kang, likewise, tells Jadzia that she is not bound by Curzon's oath, but she insists on joining their quest so she can avenge her godson. Kor, as buoyant as ever, is delighted to have her along. Koloth is dismissive, until she shows him her skills with a Klingon bat'leth. Kang refuses to accept her, until she angers him by questioning his honor. Before Jadzia can request a leave of absence, Commander Benjamin Sisko (Avery Brooks) confronts her in her quarters, refusing her request before she can make it. Jadzia tells him that she is going, and begs him not to make her disobey a direct order. He does not give her permission to go, but does not stop her either.

En route to the Albino's hideout, the four plan their attack. Kang suggests an aggressive frontal assault, which the Klingons agree to. Jadzia confronts him afterwards and finds out that the Albino had offered Kang a glorious death at the hands of forty of his best men. Kang, believing the Albino's defences are impenetrable, had accepted. Dax creates an alternative plan to disable all energy weapons in the Albino's base, restricting them to hand-to-hand combat. Kang agrees to the new plan. They transport to the surface and find that the Albino has booby trapped the main gate to kill Kang and the others before the fight started. The four move through the compound and confront the Albino in his chambers. During the fight, Koloth is killed and Kang is mortally wounded. Jadzia disarms the Albino, who taunts her, claiming she can't follow through. Kang kills the distracted Albino, before dying himself. Kor and Jadzia leave the compound as Kor sings a song to his fallen comrades.

== Production ==
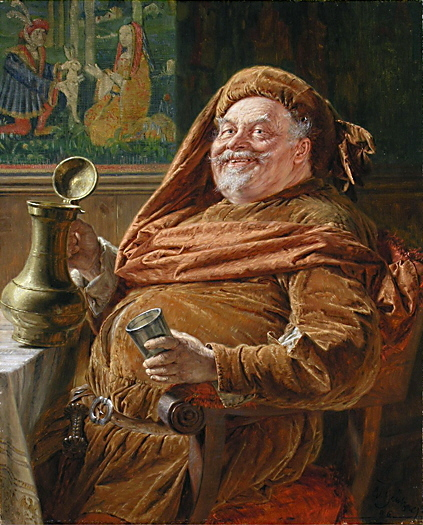
Kor was based on William Shakespeare's Falstaff (1896 painting pictured)

"Blood Oath" featured the return of Colicos, Campbell and Ansara in the Klingon roles that they had previously portrayed in Star Trek: The Original Series. The story by Peter Allan Fields originally featured new Klingon characters, but Robert Hewitt Wolfe suggested the use of the characters from The Original Series. There were concerns that the three actors were no longer working, but the casting team on Deep Space Nine at first located John Colicos and Michael Ansara, but not William Campbell. They subsequently discovered he was doing Star Trek conventions on cruise ships, and he signed up to appear once he was approached. Each of the previous appearances of those Klingon characters had been before the Klingon forehead ridge make-up was in use, and so "Blood Oath" was the first time that each of these characters had been seen with the ridges applied. There was a consideration by the producers about whether or not to use the make-up style as seen in The Original Series, but they ultimately decided not to mention the change on screen.

The story was originally entitled "The Beast" and was intended to be a play on both the 1954 Akira Kurosawa film Seven Samurai and the 1960 remake, The Magnificent Seven. Fields had concerns that this didn't come across in the final script, but intended for Koloth to represent Britt from The Magnificent Seven, whilst Kang was intended to be Yul Brynner's character, Chris. Kor instead was based on John Falstaff, who appeared in three plays by William Shakespeare. Colicos appeared as Kor, who had previously appeared as the first Klingon in the Star Trek franchise in The Original Series first-season episode "Errand of Mercy". Jordan Hoffman at the official Star Trek website described Kor as a "bumbling old uncle" and Koloth simply as a "grump". He said that only Kang seemed similar to his original persona. Colicos would return a further two times as Kor on Deep Space Nine, in the episodes "The Sword of Kahless" and "Once More unto the Breach". The episode is one of several which follows up on the actions of Curzon Dax, the previous host of the Dax symbiont. A member of the Trill species is typically composed of a host and symbiont, with the symbiont passing to a new host upon the death of the previous one. Curzon was the host immediately prior to Jadzia.

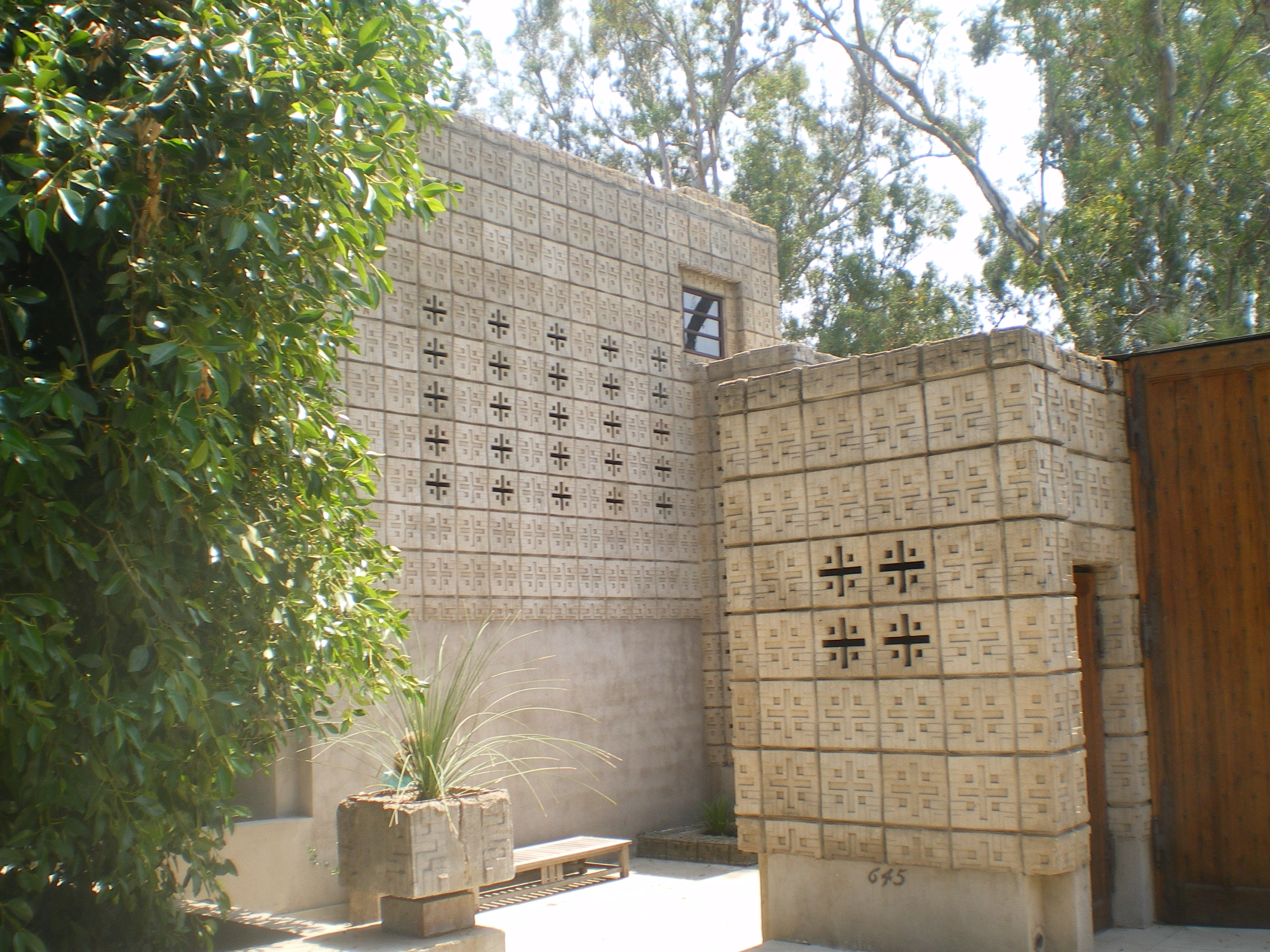
The Millard House was used as the exterior of the Albino's fortress

Campbell had appeared as Koloth in "The Trouble with Tribbles", although he had also portrayed Trelane in "The Squire of Gothos". It had been an intention to feature Koloth as a recurring character within The Original Series but he was unavailable for the following appearance and so it was rewritten to feature another character. The character of Koloth returned in the Star Trek: The Animated Series episode "More Tribbles, More Troubles" but was voiced by another actor, James Doohan. Ansara returned as Kang, who had previously appeared in The Original Series third-season episode "Day of the Dove". Ansara returned as Kang once more in the Star Trek: Voyager episode "Flashback" which also guest starred George Takei and Grace Lee Whitney from The Original Series as well as several actors from Star Trek VI: The Undiscovered Country. He also returned to Deep Space Nine in the episode "The Muse", to play Jeyal, the husband of Lwaxana Troi, who in turn was played by Majel Barrett who not only did the voice for the computer in The Next Generation, Voyager and Deep Space Nine, and was married to Gene Roddenberry, but had also played Number One and Christine Chapel in The Original Series. Terry Farrell was interviewed during the third season of the show, and described "Blood Oath" as one of the best episodes so far.

The Millard House in Pasadena, California was used to represent the outside of the fortress of the Albino, while the interior was filmed on Stage 18 in the Paramount lot. The fight scenes were jointly choreographed by Dan Curry and Dennis Madalone, with the scenes filmed over the course of two days. Director Winrich Kolbe left the choreography completely in Curry and Madalone's hands, but gave them instructions not to go overboard. Whilst filming the scenes, Kolbe had Richard Wagner's opera Götterdämmerung played on a loop throughout. This operatic theme was taken forward by composer Dennis McCarthy in his score for the episode, who said that he abandoned all subtlety, and told the orchestra to "play the battles as battles".

== Themes ==
Star Trek frequently shows death, in that crew members are killed in the line of duty. However, "Blood Oath" addresses the topic of premeditated murder for revenge purposes. In order to gain perspective on her moral dilemma about whether or not to join the three Klingons in revenge, Dax discusses it with Kira, a former Bajoran terrorist. Her response is not clear cut, but recalls how murder left an impact on her that could not be fixed. Despite not dissuading Dax, she tells Sisko, who commands Dax not to go. After Dax returns, having helped the Klingons kill the Albino, Sisko stands silent in disapproval of her actions, while Kira looks on in sympathy.

== Reception ==
"Blood Oath" was first broadcast on March 28, 1994 in broadcast syndication. It received Nielsen ratings of 8.4 million. This placed it in sixth place in the timeslot. This was a decrease from the episode aired the previous week, as "Profit and Loss" gained a rating of 8.8 million. It was higher than the episodes aired on the following three weeks, which were all repeats.

IGN praised it as a "very fun episode" and noted the return of the original series Klingon characters Koloth, Kang and Kor.

Several reviewers re-watched the episode after the end of the series. Michelle Erica Green reviewed the episode in January 2004 for TrekNation. She disliked the changes to The Original Series era Klingons, and was disappointed that plot threads that the characters faced in their previous appearances such as the fate of the tribbles in "The Trouble with Tribbles" weren't resolved. She thought that the episode was one of the better ones to place Dax in a central position and ignored any inconsistencies because she was a fan of cross-generational episodes. Rewatching the episode in 2012, Green again noted that there was much that she did not like about the episode and "it simply doesn’t live up to the glory these Klingons deserve." Jamahl Epsicokhan at his website Jammer's Reviews thought that "characterizations are flawless" and that the fight scene at the end of the episode was impressive. He gave the episode a score of three and a half out of four. Zack Handlen rewatched the episode for The A.V. Club in June 2012. He thought that the episode worked, but wasn't as powerful as it could have been and said "it's too formal and too solemn to really rouse up the blood, and the most intriguing aspects of the plot are put to the side in favor of keeping things as straightforward as possible."

== Home media releases ==
The first home media release of "Blood Oath" in the United States and Canada was on VHS on October 6, 1998. It was later released on DVD as part of the season two box set on April 1, 2003.

On April 1, 2003 Season 2 of Star Trek: Deep Space Nine was released on DVD video discs, with 26 episodes on seven discs.

This episode was released in 2017 on DVD with the complete series box set, which had 176 episodes on 48 discs.

== See also ==
Kor

- First of the three visits to Deep Space Nine of the character Kor (cf. "The Sword of Kahless"; "Once More Unto the Breach").
- Kor was the first named Klingon dating from The Original Series in "Errand of Mercy" (aired March 23, 1967).
- "The Bonding" (The Next Generation, S3-E5, Worf takes a Klingon oath (e.g. R'uustai) to adopt an orphan into his house).
