= Weapons in Star Trek =

The Star Trek fictional universe contains a variety of weapons, ranging from missiles (photon torpedoes) to melee (primarily used by the Klingons, a race of aliens in the Star Trek universe). The Star Trek franchise consists mainly of several multi-season television shows and fourteen movies, as well as various video games and merchandise. Many aspects of the Star Trek universe impact modern popular culture, especially its fictitious terminology and the concept of weaponry on spacecraft. The franchise has had a widespread influence on its audiences from the late 20th to early 21st century. Notably, Star Trek's science fiction concepts have been studied by real scientists; NASA described it in relation to the real world as "entertaining combination of real science, imaginary science gathered from lots of earlier stories, and stuff the writers make up week-by-week to give each new episode novelty." For example, NASA noted that the Star Trek "phasers" were a fictional extrapolation of real-life lasers, and compared them to real-life microwave based weapons that have a stunning effect.

== Energy weapons ==
The franchise features various directed-energy weapons, most notably the "phaser," which fit a classic raygun motif. Instead of firing physical projectiles, phasers emit energy-beams—though some newer Star Trek shows depict them firing energy bolts or pulses. A hand phaser can typically be set to "stun" or "kill".

=== Phaser ===
Phaser
- Star Trek franchise element
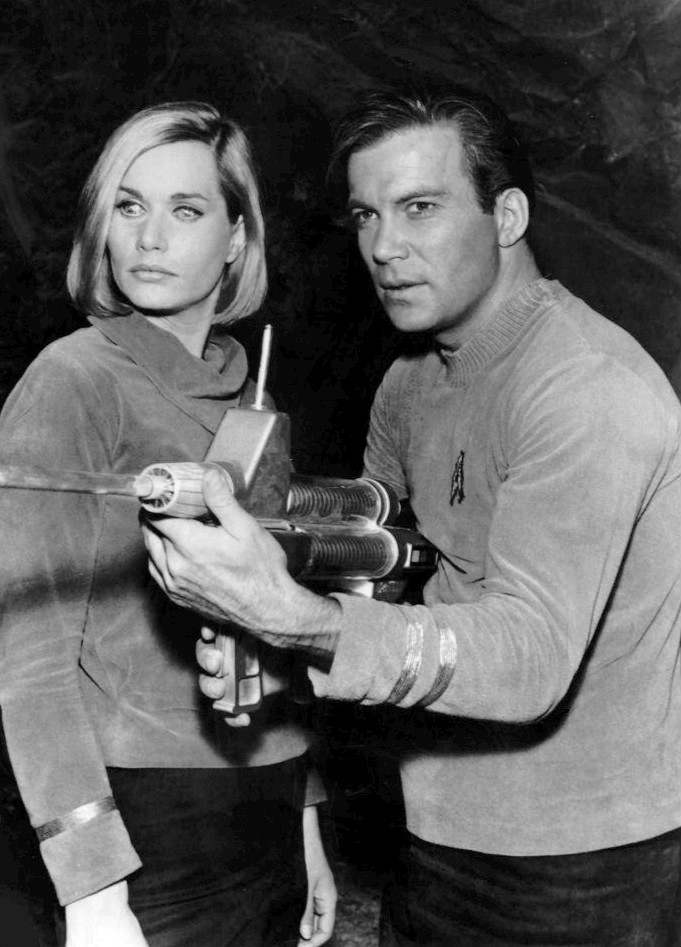
- Captain Kirk wielding a phaser rifle
- Production company: CBS
- First appearance: "Where No Man Has Gone Before"; Star Trek; 1966
- Created by: Gene Roddenberry
- Genre: Science fiction

In-universe information
- Type: Phased array Pulsed energy projectile weapon
- Function: Firearm; Explosive; Pain compliance Non-lethal weapon Riot control Welding; Melting; Heating; Burning; Lighting
- Affiliation: Starfleet

Phasers are common and versatile phased array pulsed energy projectile weapons, first seen in the original Star Trek series and later in almost all subsequent films and television spin-offs. Phasers range in size from small arms to starship-mounted weaponry. Phasers can either fire projectile like energy bolts or directed energy beams like a raygun.

Phaser output can be adjusted in both area of effect and output: a typical hand phaser can be adjusted so that it will merely shock or stun a living organism, while the effects of higher settings range from burning, disintegration, or to true vaporization. This versatility means they can also be used as welding torches or cutting tools, and can create heat sources by firing at a large, solid object (like a rock). The stream can be adjusted to strike multiple targets at once, strike a single target with precision, or even destroy large amounts of material. Phasers can be set to overload, whereby they build up a force-chamber explosion by continuously generating energy without releasing it; the resulting blast can destroy most natural objects within a 50-meter (160 ft) radius. The overload process is marked by a distinctive sound that increases in volume and frequency until it is deactivated or it detonates. Personal phasers can be made small enough to fit in the user's palm and still be lethal. Larger and more powerful phaser rifles are issued to security personnel.

Ship-mounted phasers have a similar range of functions on a larger scale: The phasers on the USS Enterprise can be used as an "anti-missile" defense to destroy incoming projectiles, stun entire city blocks full of people, destroy cities, and even destroy entire asteroids up to a given size. The ship's phaser system is also said to be capable of destroying continents.

Although starships are frequently shown firing their phasers while at Warp speeds across the various Star Trek series, this was generally avoided during The Next Generation, and the Star Trek: The Next Generation Technical Manual states that it is impossible. The Star Trek: Deep Space Nine Technical Manual, on the other hand, describes an "ACB-jacketed beam device" as the mechanism which allows phasers to function at Warp speeds.

According to later series, phasers release a beam or bolt of fictional subatomic particles called "rapid nadion", which are then refracted ("rectified") through superconducting crystals. The Star Trek: The Next Generation Technical Manual indicates that the superconducting crystals used in phasers are called fushigi no umi, which is Japanese for "sea of mystery", and the phrase is written ふしぎの海 in the original glyphs. This was a homage to the 1990 anime series Fushigi no Umi no Nadia, known in North America as Nadia: The Secret of Blue Water.

The phasers in the 2009 reboot film Star Trek appear similar in shape to the classic phasers, but fire singular energy pulses instead of a sustained stream of them, in a fashion similar to semi-automatic weapons. This version of the phaser has two settings, stun and kill, which fire blue and red colored pulses respectively. The barrel of the weapon is two-sided, one being colored red and the other blue to indicate the current setting; the user must manually rotate to the other output to use the other setting. A similar change is seen in the starship-mounted phaser banks, which also fire single energy pulse instead of continuous streams. In Star Trek Beyond, the barrel sides of the sidearm phasers are flat and both barrels shoot blue bolts that deal no physical damage, while the barrel tips are still colored blue and red.

The original phaser rifle prop from "Where No Man Has Gone Before" sold at auction in 2013 for $231,000.

=== Laser ===
Lasers are a sidearm in the original Star Trek pilot "The Cage", and laser pistols appear in several Star Trek: The Original Series (TOS) episodes. Star Trek: The Next Generation (TNG) indicates that laser weapons are outdated.

According to The Making of Star Trek, Gene Roddenberry claimed that production staff realized using laser technology would cause problems in the future, as people came to understand what lasers could and could not do. This resulted in the move to phasers on-screen, while letting lasers be known as a more primitive weapon style.

=== Plasma cannon ===
Plasma cannons are a form of directed energy weaponry used by both Earth Starfleet and the early Romulan Star Empire. On Starfleet vessels, they are the precursors to phase cannons. Plasma cannons fire a plasma discharge in the form of a beam or a burst, similar to the plasma bullets fired by hand-held plasma weapons, but much bigger in size. The NX-class is initially armed with plasma cannons.

=== Phase cannon ===
Phase cannons are 22nd century weapons, several of which first appear mounted to the Enterprise in the Star Trek: Enterprise episode "Silent Enemy". Phase cannons have a variable yield, with the cannons on the Enterprise being rated for a maximum output of 500 gigajoules, equivalent to about 120 tons of TNT. Phase cannons are generally more powerful than spatial torpedoes. They are the 22nd century precursor to phaser technology, in addition to phase pistols (hand-carried phase cannons). Unlike 24th century phasers, they do not have the normal variable power settings or a variable beam width – only stun and kill.

=== Disruptor ===
A Klingon disruptor

Disruptors are employed by several alien species in this series, including Romulans, Klingons, Breen, Cardassians, Iridians and Orions in their personal and military small arms as well as being mounted as cannon, emitters, turrets, and banks. Only the first three species are known to have type-3 disruptors, the most advanced type developed by the 24th Century. Disruptors cause damage by exciting the molecular bonds of targets to such great extents that those bonds are weakened and/or broken by the energies emitted, which often manifest as an explosive force. According to Last Unicorn's Star Trek: The Next Generation Role-playing Game, disruptors are considered less "elegant" than phaser-based weapons; their effects there are described as thermal shock and blunt force, as opposed to the "rapid nadion effect". As a result, disruptors inflict more damage to matter, but less damage to shields, than phasers. Klingons call their disruptors nISwI'.

=== Phased polaron cannon ===
Phased polaron cannons are the primary armament of the Dominion, the main antagonist faction in the later seasons of Star Trek: Deep Space Nine. The cannon emits a beam of polaron particles, the fictional in-universe antimatter counterpart of the muon (not to be confused with the actual polaron or the actual antimuon). When first introduced, Dominion polaron cannons easily penetrate the shielding systems of most Alpha Quadrant races. The Alpha Quadrant races eventually learn to modify their shields to resist polaron weaponry ("Call to Arms").

=== Tetryon cannon ===
Tetryon cannons are the primary armament of the Hirogen and are similar in application to phasers and disruptors. Tetryon cannons are unique in that they are designed primarily to damage energy and force fields, such as starship shields. Tetryon cannons damage matter, but not to the same extent as phasers or disruptors. This is in line with the Hirogen philosophy of the hunt, as depicted in Star Trek: Voyager (VOY). The Hirogen ship would therefore knock out its opponent's shields and beam over hunters to engage in face-to-face ranged or melee combat. This allows the Hirogen hunters to collect items that they would consider to be hunting trophies.

=== Varon-T disruptor ===
Varon-T disruptors are featured in the Star Trek: The Next Generation (TNG) episode "The Most Toys", and are mentioned to be a rare type of disruptor that are illegal in the Federation because of their slow, excruciating method of killing, with the weapons tearing the body apart from the inside. Kivas Fajo, a Zibalian trader in that episode, owns four of the five Varon-T disruptors ever manufactured (he sleeps with one under his pillow) and uses one on his own crew before his collection of rare items was confiscated after his capture and arrest for kidnapping and theft (among other crimes). The fifth Varon-T was kept by the criminal Kelsey who was killed when her scout ship exploded.

=== Ferengi energy whip ===
The Ferengi energy whip, as seen in the TNG episode "The Last Outpost", looks and handles like a typical bullwhip and discharges a powerful phaser-like energy pulse.

== Projectile weapons ==
=== Spatial torpedo ===
Also referred to as conventional torpedoes, spatial torpedoes are 22nd century weapons used by Enterprise. Spatial torpedoes are the ship's most powerful and primary ship-to-ship weapon before the installation of phase cannons. Spatial torpedoes are themselves superseded by more powerful photonic torpedoes. Unlike photonic torpedoes or any of the warhead's successors, spatial torpedoes are launched at sub-light velocity and can be used much in the manner of a missile, having the warhead on a fly-by-wire.

=== Photon torpedo ===
An Akira-class starship fires photon torpedoes.

Photon torpedoes are a standard ship-based weapon armed with an antimatter warhead. They are present in every version of the Star Trek series and are a standard weapon on almost every Federation ship, though in Star Trek: Enterprise (ENT), the titular ship uses less powerful spatial torpedoes (guided, rocket propelled missiles) until receiving the more powerful "photonic" variant. Photon torpedoes first appear on a Starfleet ship in the original series' episode "Arena" as part of the USS Enterprise's armament. In the Star Trek: Enterprise episode "The Expanse", the Enterprise (NX-01) first receives photonic torpedoes. Smaller Starfleet craft such as shuttlecraft and runabouts can be armed with "micro-torpedoes", a scaled-down version of photon torpedoes designed for use on craft too small to accommodate the full-sized weapon.

When fired, photon torpedoes usually appear as a spiky orb of energy of varying colours, such as red, orange, yellow, blue, or green, or in the case of Star Trek: The Original Series (TOS), red bolts. According to the original notes to TOS and The Making of Star Trek, photon torpedoes are energy shielded to allow armor-penetration. Several episodes seem to suggest this (TNG: "Suspicions"). The energy output of a photon torpedo, according to the Star Trek Technical Manuals is a maximum theoretical yield of 25 isotons and a maximum rated yield of 18.5 isotons. According to Star Trek: The Next Generation Technical Manual, photon torpedoes use 1.5 kilograms (3.3 lb) of matter and the same amount of antimatter. In the TOS episode, "Balance of Terror", photon torpedoes had replaced nuclear warheads as the primary wartime weapons on Federation starships.

Torpedoes are often depicted as being easy to modify to suit specific situations. Despite the stated maximum yield, torpedoes can be made far more destructive with relatively little effort. In Star Trek: Voyager, Tuvok and Kim modify a normal photon torpedo with a gravimetric charge, a piece of Borg technology, to increase its destructive yield to 54 isotons. Kim comments that 50 isotons would be sufficient to destroy a small planet. Janeway later instructs them to increase its yield to 80 isotons. In Star Trek VI: The Undiscovered Country, Spock and Dr. McCoy modify a photon torpedo to track the plasma emissions from a cloaked Klingon bird of prey as it attacks the Enterprise-A and the Excelsior, similar to the principal function of a heat-seeking missile.

Photon torpedo launchers aboard ships are shown to be able to fire probes, which, in-universe, are designed with this functionality in mind. In Star Trek II: The Wrath of Khan, a torpedo casing is used as a makeshift coffin for burial in space and as scientific probes as in the TNG episode "In Theory" and in Star Trek Generations.

=== Plasma torpedo ===
Plasma torpedoes are used by the Romulans, Cardassians, and (according to Star Fleet Battles, Klingon Academy and Starfleet Command) the Gorn. The damage of a plasma torpedo spreads out over several ship systems at once, but the torpedo loses its effectiveness after only a few minutes of travel. Romulan plasma torpedoes use trilithium isotopes in their warheads.

=== Gravimetric torpedoes ===
Gravimetric torpedoes are torpedoes used by the Borg. The weapon emits a complex phase variance of gravitons to create a gravimetric distortion capable of tearing starships apart.

=== Quantum torpedo ===
Quantum torpedoes first appear in the Deep Space Nine episode "Defiant" as a weapon aboard the USS Defiant. In the DS9 episode "Paradise Lost", the USS Lakota was also stated to be carrying quantum torpedoes, although they were never used. Additionally, the USS Enterprise-E is equipped with quantum torpedoes in Star Trek: First Contact and Star Trek: Nemesis. The Federation are the only known users of quantum torpedoes. The Star Trek: Deep Space Nine Technical Manual states that quantum torpedoes derive their destructive power from vacuum energy. Various in-universe sources describe quantum torpedoes as roughly double the destructive power of standard photon torpedoes, putting their yield somewhere in excess of 100 megatons of TNT.

Four of the USS Enterprise-E's quantum torpedoes destroyed an unshielded Borg sphere. The launcher appears on the 1701-E in Star Trek: Insurrection but is never fired. In Star Trek: Nemesis, nine of the Enterprise-E's quantum torpedoes disable the Scimitar's cloaking function.

Quantum torpedoes are normally shown in a shade of blue. As of Nemesis the following ship classes have quantum torpedoes launcher; Defiant–, Intrepid–, Luna–, Sovereign–, Vesta–, Akira– and Achilles–class. In addition to the uncrewed Cardassian spacecraft Dreadnought, these are the only ships known to be equipped with quantum torpedoes. Though Dreadnought only has quantum torpedoes due to the maquis acquiring them illicitly, along with their other military grade weapons. B'elanna Torres installed the quantum torpedoes on Dreadnought to increase its armament from the original complement.

=== Polaron torpedo ===
Polaron torpedoes, like the Dominion weapon, are capable of penetrating normal shielding with ease. They appear in various Star Trek games. In Starfleet Command III, it is one of the Klingon's three heavy weapon options, the others being the photon torpedo and the ion cannon. It also appears in Star Trek: Armada and Star Trek: Armada II, as a researchable weapon for the Klingon Empire exclusive to the Vor'cha-class cruiser which takes out one of the targeted ship's systems at random.

=== Transphasic torpedo ===
Transphasic torpedoes appear only once, in the Voyager series finale, "Endgame". They are high-yield torpedoes that are designed specifically to fight the Borg. The future Admiral Janeway brought them back in time in a Federation shuttlecraft and had them installed onboard Voyager in 2378. They are among the most powerful weapons used in the Star Trek universe; just one is capable of obliterating an entire Borg cube. They work by delivering destructive subspace compression pulse explosion. Upon detonation the pulse is delivered in asymmetric superposition of multiple phase states. Since the shields can block only one subcomponent of the pulse the remaining majority is delivered to the target. On the top of it every torpedo has different transphasic configuration generated randomly by a dissonant feedback effect to prevent Borg or any other enemy to predict the configuration of the phase states. Although they do not appear in the film Nemesis, according to the non-canon Destiny book trilogy these are kept by Starfleet as the weapon of last resort to be deployed to starships only when all else had failed against the Borg. Eventually, the situation becomes dire enough that the specifications are released to Federation and Klingon ships; the Borg eventually learn to adapt to them.

=== Isokinetic cannon ===
The Isokinetic cannon was seen in only one episode of Star Trek: Voyager, "Retrospect". In the episode, representatives of USS Voyager meet with a weapons trader and designer known as Kovin. The demonstration of the weapon destroys a target buoy composed of 10 m thick solid monotanium with a chromoelectric forcefield in one shot, coring it cleanly through.

=== TR-116 projectile rifle ===
The TR-116 projectile rifle is a prototype weapon developed by the Federation for situations where conventional energy weapons might be rendered useless by damping fields or other countermeasures. It is introduced in the Star Trek: Deep Space Nine episode "Field of Fire", where it is used in conjunction with a micro-transporter and a visual scanner headpiece to create an extremely potent sniper rifle. With the scanner, the shooter can precisely target people hundreds of meters away and through solid matter with no difficulty. Using the transporter attached to the barrel, the slug can then be transported during motion at full velocity, thus traveling through walls and materializing within point-blank range of the target.

=== Phased plasma torpedo ===
Phased plasma torpedoes can phase out of normal space-time to bypass shields, then phase back in to detonate on a ship's hull, thus making shields worthless against them. They only appear in the PC game Star Trek: Bridge Commander. Shortly after the recovery of the Pegasus device, the phasing properties used in the design are seen as a delivery system for torpedoes. Reducing the size of the phasing coils used to accomplish an intangible state proves difficult. Further, the antimatter within the warhead has a destabilizing effect on the phasing coil. A new kind of explosive material is needed, and it is found using the principles behind the first observed Romulan plasma weapons. The installation of a high-energy plasma infuser allows a torpedo casing to be filled with a warhead charged with high-energy plasma from the ship's warp nacelles. Warp plasma is highly unstable and can be easily detonated. Using a nanite-controlled trigger for reactant release allows vessels to deliver a high-energy plasma warhead payload within a Mark IV torpedo casing.

=== Chroniton torpedo ===
Chroniton torpedoes are a unique form of weapon employed by the Krenim. The weapons phase in and out of normal time, allowing them to pass through ordinary shields and directly damage a vessel's hull. Though dangerous, their reliability is not absolute, as Seven of Nine and Tuvok (as well as Kes in the alternate timeline presented in "Before and After") find an undetonated chroniton torpedo lodged in Voyager's hull, which in turn allow the crew to adapt the shields to withstand further attacks.

=== Positron torpedo ===
The Kessok are a highly intelligent race that ally themselves with the Cardassians, albeit through deceit, in the video game Star Trek: Bridge Commander. They utilize positron torpedoes: powerful, slow-moving projectiles able to inflict nearly twice as much damage as quantum torpedoes.

== Biological, radioactive, and chemical weapons ==
=== Thalaron radiation ===
Thalaron radiation was first used in the feature film Star Trek: Nemesis by the villain Shinzon to assassinate the entire Romulan senate. Later in the movie, Shinzon attempts to kill the crew of the USS Enterprise-E using a ship-mounted version. Thalaron radiation, even in small amounts, petrifies living tissue almost instantly. Its properties also allow its range and area of effect to be precisely controlled, from encompassing a single room to engulfing an entire planet. Its massive destructive potential leads the Federation to consider it an extremely illegal biogenic weapon. It later features prominently in the plot of "Homecoming", the Star Trek: New Frontier short story in the 2008 Mirror Universe anthology Shards and Shadows, in which the rebels manage to steal a Romulan thalaron bomb intended for use by the Alliance, to strike a balance of power against them.

=== Metreon cascade ===
The metreon cascade was designed by Dr. Ma'Bor Jetrel of the Haakonian Order. Unstable metreon isotopes are used to create a devastating explosion, with radiation effects similar to those of the 20th-century atomic bomb. Those not killed or vaporized in the initial blast suffer radiation poisoning and death in the aftermath. It is used only once, on the Talaxian moon Rinax in 2355.

=== Trilithium resin ===
Trilithium resin is a byproduct of a starship's warp engines that is lethal to humans, but harmless to Cardassians. A team of terrorists attempted to steal Trilithium resin from the warp core of the Enterprise-D when it was docked at Arkaria Station to receive a baryon sweep.

Captain Benjamin Sisko would later use a Trilithium resin torpedo to render a Maquis planet uninhabitable to all human life for fifty years by detonating it in the atmosphere.

=== Cobalt diselenide ===
Cobalt diselenide is a biogenic weapon that attacks the nervous system of Cardassians but not of other humanoids. Its synthesis involves selenium and rhodium nitrates. It is the counterpart to trilithium resin, which is lethal to most humanoids but harmless to Cardassians.

=== Aceton assimilators ===
Aceton assimilators are used to absorb energy from other sources and then redirect it back as hazardous radiation.

== Melee weapons ==
=== Federation ===
==== KaBar combat knife ====
The KaBar combat knife is the Federation's standard-issue combat and survival knife. It is 32.5 cm (12.8 in) and is standard equipment in survival gear and in emergency weapons caches aboard starships. Captain Kathryn Janeway uses one in the Star Trek: Voyager episode "Macrocosm".

In the real world, the KA-BAR is an official combat knife of the United States Marine Corps.

==== Katana ====
A katana is a Federation sword of Japanese origin. The only major difference is that the Star Trek version is foldable, thus occupying a minimum space when carried and stored. In the 2009 Star Trek reboot, Lieutenant Hikaru Sulu produces a folding katana with which to cut the lines of his parachute.

=== Jem'Hadar ===
==== Bayonet ====
The Jem'Hadar often have bayonets attached to their plasma (also known as polaron-pulse) rifles. They employ these in close combat, or to execute prisoners. Often Jem'Hadar bayonets are chemically enhanced, releasing a lethal nerve-agent on contact.

==== Kar'takin ====
Kar'takin are straight-bladed polearms used by the Jem'Hadar in close combat. They are used by both Starfleet officers and Jem'Hadar in the Star Trek: Deep Space Nine episode "To the Death". The Kar'takin bear a resemblance to the Bardiche axe.

==== Shock Blade ====
In the Star Trek: Deep Space Nine: The Fallen video game, this weapon delivers a taser-like jolt to whatever it strikes in combat. Holding the shock blade's trigger discharges a beam of neuro-electrical energy, with an effective range of 15 feet.

=== Klingon ===
==== Bat'leth (AKA betleH) ====
The bat'leth is the Klingon double-sided scimitar/hook sword/lujiaodao hybrid–edge weapon, designed by martial arts enthusiast and Star Trek: The Next Generation effects producer Dan Curry. The bat'leth is a curved blade with spiked protrusions and handholds along the middle of the blade's back. In battle, the handholds are used to twirl and spin the blade rapidly.

Klingon oral history holds that the first bat'leth was forged around 625 A.D. by Kahless, who dropped a lock of his hair into the lava from the Kri'stak Volcano, then plunged the fiery lock into the lake of Lursor and twisted it to form a blade. After forging the weapon, he used it to defeat the tyrant Molor, and in doing so united the Klingon homeworld. This first bat'leth is known as the Sword of Kahless' and was stolen by the invading Hur'q; an episode of Deep Space Nine revolves around an effort to recover the Sword of Kahless. The name bat'leth itself is a slight corruption of batlh 'etlh, which means "Sword of Honor" in Klingon.

A "Valdris" blade was used in Colorado Springs, Colorado, in two 7-Eleven armed-robberies in 2009.

==== Chon'naq (AKA chonnaQ) ====
A smaller version of this "belly–spear" (the literal Klingon translation) is used in the children's game of qa'vak, which incorporates spinning hoops, and hones assorted skills needed for hunting. Once a male Klingon reaches the Age of Ascension, he is presented with an adult version of the chon'naq by his father - on the occasion of their first hunt together as men.

==== D'k tahg (AKA Daqtagh) ====
A d'k tahg is a Klingon dagger. The knife has three blades: a main blade with a cutout in the center, and two smaller blades on either side. In some models, these side blades are spring–loaded and can pop out into position and close up for storage. In other models, the blades are fixed. It also features a pommel studded with blunt spikes. The d'k tahg first appears in Star Trek III: The Search for Spock, and appears occasionally throughout the following films and television series. The knife was designed by Gil Hibben. Although the d'k tahg appears in Star Trek III, it is not referred to by name until Star Trek: The Next Generation.

==== Haf'leth ====
This polearm is similar to a halberd.

==== Iw'taj (AKA 'Iw taj) ====
Directly descended from the weapon which inspired the Klingon tIq'ghob emblem, this dagger (literal translation: 'blood-knife') is longer and heavier than the d’k tahg (which was derived from it). The Iw'taj is a dedicated dueling weapon.

The two side–blades, one pointing up and one pointing down, serve particular functions. The upward-pointing blade is designed to catch an opponent's weapon and, with a twisting motion, disarm him. The downward-pointing blade is designed to inflict shallow cuts in passing, sapping the enemy's strength; said design allows the weapon to advance smoothly, without this blade getting in the way. Duelists often hook their index and middle fingers over the crossbar; doing this allows the weapon to achieve impressive agility, despite weakening the grip. It may also be used with a reverse grip.

The Iw'taj is often carried by traditionalists, and by discerning martial artists. Usually, a warrior who carries both a mek’leth and an Iw'taj is from a Qvav’mar background, and/or is a personal combatant of high caliber.

==== Jej'taj (AKA jejtaj) ====
This throwing-dagger is more often used defensively, to ward off blade attacks. Typically, it is wielded as a combination knuckleduster/boomerang.

==== Mek'leth (AKA meqleH) ====
A mek'leth is the Klingon short sword that appears in several episodes of Star Trek: Deep Space Nine and in the film Star Trek: First Contact. Designed by Dan Curry, it consists of a short, thick, curved blade with a metal guard extending back parallel with the grip to protect the hand. Worf is the most commonly seen user of the mek'leth, owning one and using it several times, including in hand-to-hand combat against Borg drones in First Contact.

==== Oy'naq (AKA 'oy'naQ) ====
This "pain-stick" (the literal translation), capable of killing a 2-ton Rectyne Monopod, is used as part of the Klingon Age of Ascension ritual.

==== Kut'luch (AKA qutluch) ====
Similar to the d'k tahg, the kut'luch is "the ceremonial weapon of an assassin". A kut'luch is designed to do considerable damage to internal organs, by Klingon standards thus making it an extremely lethal weapon. The kut'luch is featured in the Star Trek: The Next Generation episode "Sins of the Father", when Worf's brother, Kurn, is stabbed; and in the Star Trek: Voyager episode "Real Life", where the Doctor's simulated "son" prepares for the Kut'luch ceremony.

==== Tik'leth (AKA tIqleH) ====
This “longsword” (the literal translation of tIq 'etlh) is one of the more Terran–like Klingon weapons. Like spears, tik'leths are traditional weapons of the rank-and-file. Many nobles prefer a tik'leth's offensive functionality to that of a bat'leth, while many soldiers carry mass-produced bat’leths as a status symbol.

=== Romulan ===
==== Teral'n ====
A Romulan polearm, similar to a trident with retractable blades. It appears in the 2009 Star Trek reboot and is used by the renegade miner Nero. In the Countdown comic, Nero's weapon is revealed to be the "Debrune teral'n", an ancient Romulan artifact that symbolized the empire's power; it is traditionally held by the presiding Praetor.

A similar weapon, resembling an axe was also used by a member of Nero's crew.

=== Vulcan ===
==== Ahn'woon ====
An ahn'woon is a Vulcan catch–strangle weapon, similar in principle to a cast net but more versatile. Depending on the skill of the user, it can be used several ways. It is wide enough to be a sling. In James Blish’s adaptation of the TOS script, Kirk employs it this way and hits Spock in the ribs with a stone. The multi-strapped weapon (approximately 1.1 meters long) uses weights on the ends of the straps, like bolas, to entangle, stun, or cut the target. The application of tying action and wrapping, as with a garrote, can restrict the breathing of the target, asphyxiating the victim. It is considered the oldest Vulcan weapon.

==== Lirpa ====
A lirpa is a large Vulcan weapon consisting of a wooden staff with a semicircular blade at one end and a metal bludgeon on the other. It is similar to the monk's spade and the pugil stick. Captain James T. Kirk and Spock used lirpas when they fought for possession of T'Pring during Spock's Pon farr ritual in "Amok Time". Soldiers sent after Jonathan Archer and T'Pol fought with lirpas because Vulcan's "Forge" region makes conventional energy weapons useless.

=== Others ===
==== Glavin ====
In the TNG episode "Code of Honor", the Ligonians have deep traditions of fighting with a poison-tipped hand weapon called a glavin. It is a large glove with a recurved claw at the end, and covered with dozens of spines. In several episodes, Worf is seen displaying one in his quarters, most likely the same one used by Lt. Tasha Yar.

==== Mortaes ====
In the TOS episode "The Cloud Minders", mortaes and thongs are mining tools used as martial weapons by the "troglyte" (a corruption of troglodyte) miners, and apparently the ruling class is also trained with these weapons, as Plasus challenges Kirk to hand-to-hand combat, asking, "Are you as brave with a mortae as with a phaser?" Kirk responds, "Both will kill."

==== Ushaan-tor ====
In the Enterprise episode "United", Andorian commander Thy'lek Shran and the NX-01's captain Jonathan Archer, as a second for a Tellarite officer who kills Tallas, Shran's chief tactical officer and lover, engage in an Andorian "ushaan" duel. The weapon used is the ushaan-tor, an Andorian ice-mining blade. The handheld blade of the ushaan-tor is about 20 cm from end to end, and resembles an Inupiat Ulu blade from Alaska, but in a one-piece all-metal design instead of having a separate wooden handle.

== Subspace weapons ==
Subspace weapons are a class of directed energy weapons that directly affect subspace. The weapons can produce actual tears in subspace, and are extremely unpredictable. These weapons were banned under the second Khitomer Accord. The Son'a equipped their vessels with these types of weapons.

=== Isolytic burst ===
Son'a vessels carried and used isolytic burst weapons, a type of subspace weapon. They were seen using this weapon against the Enterprise-E in Star Trek: Insurrection. The Enterprise was only able to escape the weapon's effect by ejecting its warp core and detonating it to seal a subspace rift.

=== Tricobalt devices ===
The tricobalt warhead is a subspace weapon whose high-yield detonations can tear holes in subspace. Tricobalt devices are not a standard armament of Federation vessels and yields are calculated in Tera-Cochranes, indicating that its mechanism is somewhat similar to the general reaction in a warp field.

In TOS: "A Taste of Armageddon", the Eminian Union classified the USS Enterprise as 'destroyed' when it was hit by virtual tricobalt satellites. In DS9: "Trials and Tribble-ations", Arne Darvin plants a tricobalt explosive in a dead Tribble in an attempt to kill Kirk. USS Voyager uses a pair of tricobalt devices to destroy the Caretaker array in the Star Trek: Voyager pilot episode, "Caretaker", and such a device was used against Voyager in the episode "Blink of an Eye". A tricobalt warhead was also used by the Tholians in the Star Trek: Enterprise episode "In a Mirror, Darkly". They detonated a tricobalt warhead inside the gravity well of a dead star. The explosion created an interphasic rift, which they used to lure the Federation starship USS Defiant from another universe.

The games Star Trek: Armada and Star Trek: Armada II have ships armed with Tricobalt devices for artillery support. The Federation Steamrunner-class, the Klingon Chuq'Beh-class Bird of Prey, the Romulan Raptor-class Warbird, and the Borg Harbinger are all capable of using them. The workings of the weapon is unknown but theorised is the use of Cobalt-60.

It is far more likely that tricobalt refers to the third periodical table analog for cobalt; similar to dilithium being the second periodic table equivalent of regular lithium. "trititanium" and most other in trek universe usage where a numeric prefix is appended to a regular real world periodic table element refers to additional periodic tables whose elements are composed of nucleons that are not protons or neutrons and maybe not even regular electrons yet can form atoms molecules and chemical compounds similar to normal matter.

Neutron radiation such as produced by a Cobalt 60 weapon is not very useful for destroying outposts, starships or anything else that is not a living creature.

== Other weapons ==
=== Magnetometric guided charges ===
Around Stardate 43995, the Borg used this weapon to drive the USS Enterprise, NCC-1701-D, from the Paulson Nebula. This shortly leads to the abduction of Captain Jean-Luc Picard.

=== Multikinetic neutronic mines ===
During Season 4, Episode 1 of Star Trek: Voyager, Captain Janeway consults with Borg representative Seven of Nine on how to destroy Species 8472. Janeway calls Seven of Nine's "multikinetic neutronic mine" a "weapon of mass destruction," following up on a statement from Tuvok that it would affect an entire starsystem, destroying innocent worlds. The mine's five-million isoton yield can disperse Borg nanoprobes across a five-light year range.

=== Dreadnought ===
Dreadnought was a Cardassian self-guided missile, containing one thousand kilograms of matter, and another thousand of antimatter. Tuvok describes this as enough to destroy a small moon. Although described as a self-guided missile, in practice Dreadnought functions much like an autonomous starship, and it even had life support capability on board. It possesses shields, phasers, a complement of quantum torpedoes, a Thoron shock emitter, a plasma wave weapon, engines capable of reaching at least Warp 9, and a sophisticated computer AI. It appears in the Voyager episode of the same name. It had been captured by the Maquis due to a failed detonator and reprogrammed to attack its original creator. It was dragged into the Delta Quadrant in much the same manner as Voyager, and when unable to resolve the unforeseen situation it locked on to a planet that was similar to the one it was programmed to target, but which was inhabited by innocents. Dreadnought was equipped with an exceptionally sophisticated artificial intelligence, capable of "paranoia" to a certain degree, as when reprogrammer B'Elanna Torres attempted to prevent it from destroying the innocent planet, it came to the conclusion that she had been captured by her Cardassian enemies and forced to make up a story to prevent the attack; it then pretended to follow her commands and shut down, only to re-activate and continue its mission once she was no longer aboard.

=== Series 5 long range tactical armor unit ===
Similar in purpose to the Cardassian Dreadnought, the Tactical Armor Units are self-guided missiles with sophisticated artificial intelligence. They are much smaller than Dreadnought, being only a few feet in length, and while nowhere near as powerful, they are nonetheless classified as weapons of mass destruction, capable of destroying everything in a 200-kilometer radius with a highly focused antimatter explosion. Their coordination and control is done through a "Strategic Command Matrix", analogous to a nuclear control network of the type used by the United States. Each one possesses shielding, warp drive of indeterminate speed, and a sentient, genius-level artificial intelligence programmed to do whatever is necessary to reach their targets and detonate. They can detect and prevent tampering, are intelligent enough to find a way past almost any obstacle, and can win engagements even when outnumbered. They were created by a Delta Quadrant race called the Druoda, and the devices were greatly feared for their endurance and tenacity.

=== Q firearms ===
Q firearms were used in the Q Civil War by the Voyager crew to compensate against the infinite power of the Q in "The Q and the Grey". They are depicted as muzzle-loading muskets, to fit with the American Civil War-theme used by the Q Continuum as a concession to the human characters' limited perceptions. Presumably, their actual form would be as incomprehensible to non-Q as the Continuum itself. The use of the weapons caused stars to go supernova as a side effect in normal reality. They are arguably the most powerful weapons ever wielded by any humanoid species, as indicated by their ability to injure the otherwise-invulnerable Q.

=== Red matter ===
In the 2009 Star Trek reboot, red matter was developed on Vulcan before 2387. When even a droplet is ignited an unstable singularity is formed; accordingly, it must be stored in a protective chamber. The red matter was originally to be used to save the Romulan homeworld from a volatile supernova, but the design was finished too late to prevent Romulus' destruction. Upon capture in the "past" (2258) by the Romulan Nero, it was used as a planet-destroying doomsday weapon in conjunction with a plasma drill which bored a hole almost to the core of a planet. A small amount of red matter was then activated at the bottom of the drilling site, creating a black hole in the heart of the planet that would tear it apart from within. Red matter was thus used to destroy an alternate Vulcan ("alternate" due to temporal disruption, from Nero's haphazard method of time travel), then ultimately destroyed Nero's ship, the Narada, along with all remaining technology from his ship, and all of the remaining red matter.

=== Psionic resonator ===
A psionic resonator was a weapon that functioned by amplifying telepathic energy and focusing it into kinetic form. In 2369 one type of Vulcan psionic resonator, known as the Stone of Gol was discovered to still exist, though in pieces, long after it was thought destroyed. The mercenary Arctus Baran was hired to locate the pieces and deliver them to the Vulcan Isolationist Movement.

== See also ==
- Weapons in science fiction
