= The Sword of Kahless =

- Star Trek: Deep Space Nine episode
- Kor and Worf watch as Jadzia Dax places the Sword of Kahless in the runabout's transporter.
- Episode no.: Season 4 Episode 9
- Directed by: LeVar Burton
- Story by: Richard Danus
- Teleplay by: Hans Beimler
- Cinematography by: Jonathan West
- Production code: 481
- Original air date: November 20, 1995

Guest appearances
- John Colicos as Kor; Rick Pasqualone as Toral; Tom Morga as Soto

Episode chronology
← Previous "Little Green Men"	Next → "Our Man Bashir"
- Star Trek: Deep Space Nine season 4

"The Sword of Kahless" is the 81st episode of the American science fiction television series Star Trek: Deep Space Nine, the ninth of the fourth season. It originally aired on November 20, 1995, in broadcast syndication. The story was created by Richard Danus and was turned into a teleplay by Hans Beimler. The episode was directed by Star Trek: The Next Generation alumnus LeVar Burton, and featured the return of John Colicos as Kor. Colicos had first appeared as Kor in the Star Trek: The Original Series episode "Errand of Mercy", and had previously appeared in this series in the episode "Blood Oath".

Set in the 24th century, the series follows the adventures on Deep Space Nine, a space station located near a stable wormhole between the Alpha and Gamma quadrants of the Milky Way Galaxy. In this episode, Kor returns to the station to recruit Lt. Cmdr. Worf (Michael Dorn) and Lt. Cmdr. Jadzia Dax (Terry Farrell) to help to find the ancient Sword of Kahless, the legendary founder of the Klingon Empire. After they find the sword, they are forced to evade the forces of Toral (Rick Pasqualone), son of Duras, and Worf and Kor come to blows over the future use of the weapon.

After the character Worf, who originated on Star Trek: The Next Generation, joined the cast of Deep Space Nine at the beginning of the fourth season, this was the first episode to feature Worf as a main character in its central storyline. Due to time restraints in filming, there were edits made to the scripts and the production team were forced to make best use of the cave sets which had been seen on the show previously. The sword itself was created specifically for the episode, and was made to seem more elaborate than the bat'leths previously seen in Star Trek, including hand etchings to make it appear similar to Damascus steel. Composer David Bell sought to bring influences of Richard Wagner into the score, including the use of Wagner tubas. Although producers were disappointed with the initial fan reaction, critics later gave a mostly positive response to the episode and compared it to Indiana Jones and The Treasure of the Sierra Madre.

== Plot ==
Kor (John Colicos), a revered Klingon warrior, is in Quark's bar telling stories of past battles to his friend Lieutenant Commander Jadzia Dax (Terry Farrell). She introduces Kor to her colleague Lieutenant Commander Worf (Michael Dorn). He explains that he is on a quest to find the legendary Sword of Kahless, the founder of the Klingon Empire; he has come into possession of a shroud which he believes once held the Sword. When he returns to his quarters, Kor is attacked by a Lethean who reads his thoughts in order to find out about the Sword. Jadzia verifies the authenticity of the shroud, and the next morning she, Kor, and Worf depart for the Gamma Quadrant to search for the Sword on the planet where the shroud was found.

On the planet, they discover a secret chamber in an underground vault containing the Sword. They are attacked by Toral (Rick Pasqualone), son of Duras, who hired the Lethean and wants the Sword for the prestige of finding it. Kor, Worf and Jadzia fight past Toral and his men and after finding that they cannot transport back to their ship, they head into the adjoining cave system in order to try to escape Toral. As they travel through the caves, the Klingons are affected by the prestige of the Sword: Kor begins to talk about how it would allow him to overthrow Chancellor Gowron and Emperor Kahless II; but Worf believes that he should be the one to lead their people. Suddenly, Kor slips down the side of a cliff but refuses to let go of the Sword. Worf grabs the other end of the Sword, and tries to convince Kor to let go.

Dax helps Worf save Kor, and afterwards takes possession of the Sword because she thinks the two Klingons cannot be trusted with it. The three make camp and Dax tries to sleep, but is awakened by an argument between Kor and Worf. The fight between them stops momentarily when Toral and his men arrive. After Toral is subdued, Kor and Worf again attack each other. Jadzia stuns them both with her phaser and then forces Toral to enable the three to return to their ship. After they depart the planet, Kor and Worf realize that if the Sword divided two men as honorable as they, it would do the same to the Klingon Empire, so they beam it into space, leaving it to drift until the Klingon Empire is ready for it.

== Production ==
The episode was directed by Levar Burton, who had previously directed for Star Trek: The Next Generation; overall he would direct 28 Star Trek television episodes. Also, LeVar Burton had previously acted in the franchise as Geordi La Forge on Star Trek The Next Generation.

=== Writing ===
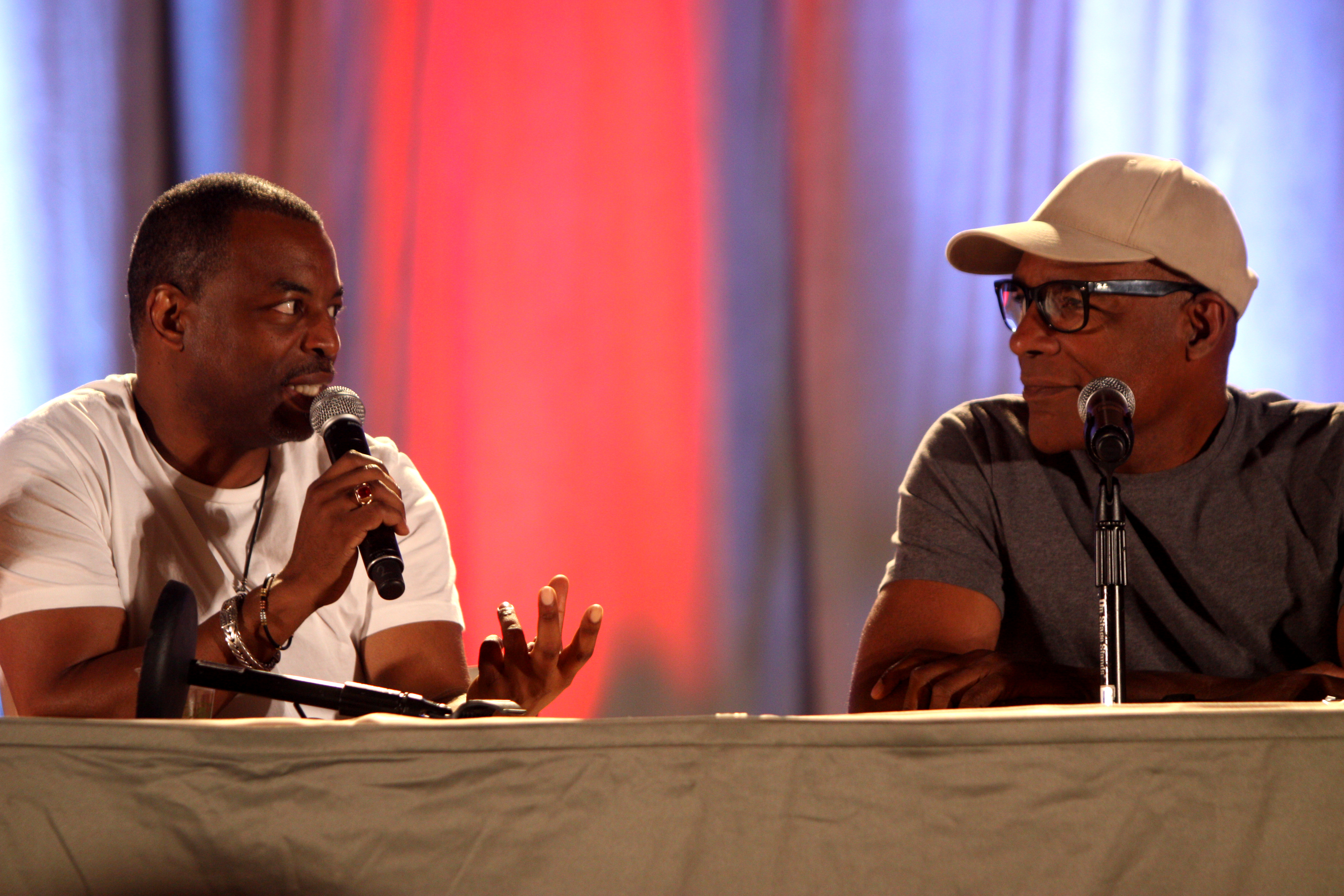
The episode was the first to feature Michael Dorn's (right) character centrally in this series, and was directed by LeVar Burton (left).

"The Sword of Kahless" was the first Deep Space Nine (DS9) episode to predominantly focus on Worf. Michael Dorn had joined the cast at the beginning of season four, but his character was not featured prominently in the first eight episodes of the season because they had been scripted prior to confirmation that Dorn would be joining the show. "The Sword of Kahless" was the first episode to be written after his arrival, so it was the first time his character was featured centrally. The story was created by Richard Danus, who had been the executive story editor during the third season of TNG, when Ira Steven Behr joined the production team. Danus had written TNG episodes such as "Deja Q" and co-wrote the teleplay for "Booby Trap". It was Behr who gave Danus the opportunity to write for DS9, after they became friends following Behr's arrival on TNG.

The episode's director, Burton, described the story as something akin to the search for the Holy Grail in Klingon mythology. Hans Beimler, who converted Danus' story into a teleplay, was aware of the mythology of the Grail as he wrote the script and wanted to avoid giving the sword any mystical or magical powers. He said that "It's the concept of the sword that has the power. We could have said that some technology or magic gave the Klingons the feeling of power, but that would have been a cheap way to go." The writing staff was disappointed in the reaction of many fans, who wanted a technological explanation for the effects of the sword.

=== Filming, casting and music ===
Because of limited time to film, several edits were made to the script by Beimler. Some of the scenes set in the cave sets were dropped as they would have taken too long to set up. Kor, Worf, and Dax were in almost every scene of the episode, meaning that time could not be saved by filming more than one scene at a time. The cave sequences were filmed on the cave standing sets on stage 18 of Paramount Studios. The sets were limited, so Burton said that in order to make it look like the characters were moving through a complex labyrinth of caves, he and director of photography Jonathan West used the sets' depth to make them look like different parts of the caves.

The precipice that Kor nearly falls down was created by filming the actors on the second level of the cave sets and then matting the footage onto a 8 feet (2.4 m) long miniature version of the cave that Gary Hutzel created out of aluminium foil. The production staff also spread sand onto the floor of the cave sets in order to make it look different from other episodes in which the sets had been used. Burton advised Farrell on the aggressiveness Dax should show in her interactions with Kor and Worf in the episode, a type of performance which both Burton and Farrell later nicknamed "Action Barbie".

John Colicos had appeared as Kor once before on DS9, in the second-season episode "Blood Oath". In The Original Series first-season episode "Errand of Mercy", Colicos had portrayed Star Trek's first main character Klingon. Rick Pasqualone appeared as Toral, son of Duras, in "The Sword of Kahless". Originally, the character, played by JD Cullum, was introduced in the TNG two-part episode "Redemption", when he sought the leadership of the Klingon High Council alongside his aunts Lursa and B'Etor. Worf has history with the House of Duras, dating back to the rivalry between Worf's father, Mogh, and Toral's grandfather, Ja'Rod.

Composer David Bell created music for the episode that had echoes of the operas of 19th-century German composer Richard Wagner. He explained that he used "Wagner opera vocabulary in the orchestrations, and ... actually used Wagner tubas in the score". He used religious tones to accompany appearances of the sword itself, specifically when it is first found by Worf, and said, "If the audience isn't made to understand the spiritual importance of that weapon, then we have no episode".

=== Props ===
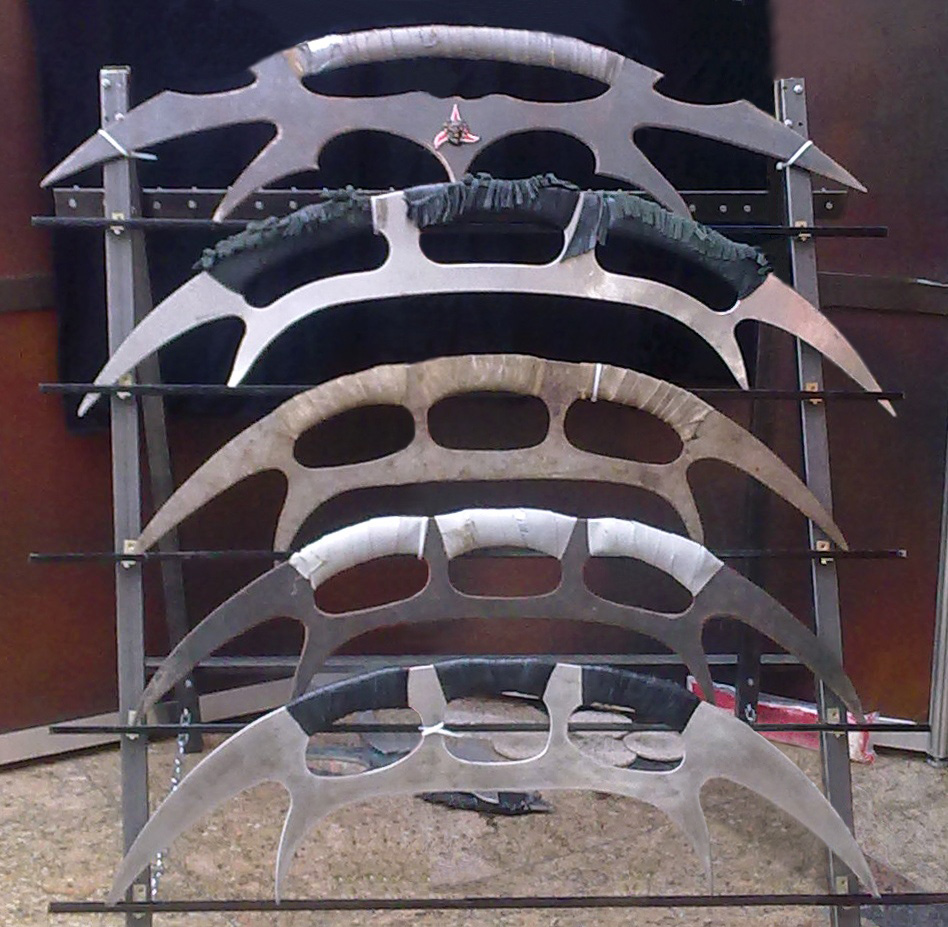
Several replica bat'leths, with a replica sword of Kahless on the top

Dan Curry created the Klingon bat'leth weapon while working on TNG. Its first appearance was in the episode "Reunion" and has appeared in all live action series of Star Trek with the exception of The Original Series. According to Klingon mythology, the Sword of Kahless was the first bat'leth made by Kahless himself, which he used to defeat the tyrant Molor, and to unite the Klingon people for the first time in their history.

It was decided that the sword needed to be different from other bat'leths seen on the show, and so a new hardened aluminium prop was ordered after numerous designs by John Eaves were considered on paper. As with the original bat'leth, Dan Curry created the prop. Sculptor Dragon Dronet then etched designs into the blade by hand using dental tools. The producers requested designs on the blade similar to the effects seen in Damascus steel, which was combined with Dronet's idea of forming these into a topographic map, with an effect described as being "as if you're staring down at mountains". Klingon names were then added to the side of the weapon. Dronet also created the stand for the sword out of plexiglas which was spray-painted to look metallic. The legs of the stand were carved to look like the feet of the Klingon animal known as the targ. "The Sword of Kahless" also featured new prop designs for Starfleet-issued over-the-shoulder bags and the camping equipment used in the cave sequences.

== Reception ==
"The Sword of Kahless" was first broadcast on November 20, 1995, in broadcast syndication. It received Nielsen ratings of 6.9 percent, placing it in tenth place in its timeslot and lower than the episode that aired the previous week, "Little Green Men", which gained a rating of 7.1 percent. "The Sword of Kahless" received a higher rating than the following episode, "Our Man Bashir", seen by 6.8 percent of viewers.

Several reviewers re-watched the episode after the end of the series. Michelle Erica Green, who watched the episode in April 2013 for TrekNation, thought that it was not a typical Deep Space Nine episode and that it required knowledge of Worf's history from The Next Generation. She said that the episode was "admirable for a drama that takes place mostly walking through uninteresting cave sets". She thought that towards the end, it became a little "mumbo-jumbo-mystical" but that it was in "perfect keeping with the Klingons". She felt that the episode again relied on Jadzia's past as Curzon Dax and that the ending would have been better with Toral stealing the sword at the last minute so that it could be followed up with in a later episode. Jamahl Epsicokhan of Jammer's Reviews compared the episode to an Indiana Jones story and said that it was a "enjoyable fable for a simpler time". He praised the musical score by David Bell and thought that the episode was the perfect vehicle for Worf, saying that Michael Dorn gave a strong performance. He gave the episode a rating of three and a half out of four.

Zack Handlen, writing for The A.V. Club in January 2013, said that the plot was similar to the plots of stories such as The Treasure of the Sierra Madre (1927). He felt that the episode showed a side of Worf that had not been seen before, and that Worf had exhibited a "willingness to go to absolute lengths to do what he believes needs to be done". He compared it to the anger bubbling under the surface of Bruce Banner in the 2012 film The Avengers. Keith DeCandido of Tor.com rewatched the episode in 2014 and gave it 8 out of 10, and called it "a strong story that understands the power of, well, strong stories, of myth, of legend, and also of the power that they imbue objects with, and how that power can corrupt."

In 2015, Geek.com rated the scene where Worf holds the Kahless artifact as one of the top 35 moments in Star Trek. In 2017, The Daily Dot recommended the episode as a Star Trek Klingon alien themed episode to prepare for Star Trek: Discovery.

== Home media release ==
The first home media release of "The Sword of Kahless" was as a two-episode VHS cassette alongside "Our Man Bashir" in the United Kingdom on June 13, 1996, followed in the United States and Canada by a single-episode release on October 3, 2000. It was later released on DVD as part of the season four box set on August 5, 2003.

== See also ==
- Kor was the first named Klingon dating to TOS in "Errand of Mercy" (aired March 23, 1967)
- Once More unto the Breach (Star Trek: Deep Space Nine) (Following Kor episode)
- Rightful Heir (Introduces Kahless, broadcast May 17, 1993)
