= Profit and Loss (Star Trek: Deep Space Nine) =

- Star Trek: Deep Space Nine episode
- Episode no.: Season 2 Episode 18
- Directed by: Robert Wiemer
- Written by: Flip Kobler, Cindy Marcus
- Production code: 438
- Original air date: March 21, 1994

Guest appearances
- Mary Crosby as Natima; Andrew Robinson as Elim Garak; Michael Reilly Burke as Hogue; Heidi Swedberg as Rekelen; Edward Wiley as Gul Toran

Episode chronology
← Previous "Playing God"	Next → "Blood Oath"
- Star Trek: Deep Space Nine season 2

"Profit and Loss" is the 38th episode of the science fiction television series Star Trek: Deep Space Nine. It is the 18th episode of the second season. The episode aired on television on March 21, 1994.

Set in the 24th century, the series follows the adventures on Deep Space Nine, a space station located near the planet Bajor, as Bajor recovers from a decades-long brutal occupation by the imperialistic Cardassians. In this episode, the bartender Quark is reunited with a former lover, only to discover that she is involved in dangerous political intrigue. This episode develops the storyline of the Cardassian government, and of the exiled Cardassian spy-turned-tailor Garak.

This episode was being filmed when the 1994 Northridge earthquake occurred on January 17 of that year. Armin Shimerman and Edward Wiley left the Paramount Pictures lot in full Ferengi and Cardassian makeup respectively.

== Plot ==
Cardassian professor Natima Lang (Mary Crosby) arrives at Deep Space Nine with her students, Rekelen and Hogue — political dissidents intent on reforming the oppressive Cardassian military government. Lang and Quark were once lovers; Lang ended the relationship after Quark betrayed her trust, and she now wants nothing to do with him, but he still has feelings for her.

When Lang sees Garak at Quark's bar, she panics, guessing he will inform the Cardassian government of their presence. In the guise of a conversation about fashion, Garak hints to Quark that Lang's radical beliefs and companions are likely to lead to her death. Quark offers Lang his assistance, but she refuses, not trusting him to care about anyone but himself.

Meanwhile, a Cardassian warship arrives and threatens the station. Garak explains to DS9's senior staff that Cardassian Central Command wants Hogue and Rekelen, whom he describes as terrorists, handed over.

Quark offers Hogue and Rekelen a contraband cloaking device to help them escape, on the condition that Lang stay with him. Lang has an argument with Quark, during which she accidentally shoots a phaser at Quark, stunning him. Horrified, Lang finally admits that she still loves him and Quark finally manages to convince her to stay.

Lang and her students are arrested by security chief Odo: the Bajoran government has agreed to turn them over to the Cardassians in exchange for the release of several Bajoran prisoners. A former rival of Garak's, Gul Toran, tells Garak that Central Command wants the prisoners dead; in exchange for killing them, Garak will be allowed to return to Cardassia.

Quark convinces Odo to release Lang and her students. Garak greets them at their ship, where he laments that he must now kill Quark as well. Toran appears, revealing that he only used Garak to learn Hogue and Rekelen's whereabouts; the offer of a return to Cardassia was a lie. Garak shoots him and allows Lang, Hogue, and Rekelen to escape. Lang convinces Quark to let her leave, promising to return to him when her work reforming the Cardassian government is done. Quark sadly lets her go.

Once she leaves, Quark asks why Garak shot Toran, and Garak asks why Quark let Lang go. "I had no choice — I love her," Quark says. Garak replies, "And I love Cardassia, which explains what I did".

== Themes ==
The story takes inspiration from the film Casablanca. The initial title for the episode was "Here's lookin' at you", which was changed for legal reasons.

== Production ==
In this episode, the main guest star is Mary Crosby, playing the role of Natima Lang. Mary is the daughter of Bing Crosby and the aunt of Denise Crosby, who had played Tasha Yar on Star Trek: The Next Generation.

Producer Ira Steven Behr disliked this episode, because he believed that it made Quark come across as too heroic. However, makeup artist Michael Westmore has stated that the love scene between Quark and Natima Lang in this episode was one of his favorite Star Trek scenes. He liked the scene so much because in spite of the heavy prosthetic makeup, it was a simple, romantic scene between two people in love and the makeup becomes completely unimportant. Armin Shimerman (Quark) and Mary Crosby (Natima Lang) had their makeup touched up every time the actors kissed, since his red-orange makeup kept mixing with her light grey makeup.

During filming, a 6.7 magnitude earthquake struck on January 17, 1994 at 4:31 am, while Armin Shimerman, Mary Crosby, Edward Wiley, and other actors requiring extensive makeup, were in preparation for crew call. Most of the actors in the makeup trailer (whilst still in makeup) ran to their cars and drove home to check on their families. While driving through the streets of L.A., many of the actors startled many other motorists with their bizarre alien makeup. According to Armin Shimerman, he "scared the crap out of people" with his alien appearance.

Michael Reilly Burke, who plays Hogue, had also performed on Star Trek: The Next Generation, but not as the same character.

== Releases ==
On April 1, 2003, Season 2 of Star Trek: Deep Space Nine was released on DVD video discs, with 26 episodes on seven discs.

This episode was released in 2017 on DVD with the complete series box set, which had 176 episodes on 48 discs.
