= Our Man Bashir =

- Star Trek: Deep Space Nine episode
- Episode no.: Season 4 Episode 10
- Directed by: Winrich Kolbe
- Story by: Robert Gillan
- Teleplay by: Ronald D. Moore
- Production code: 482
- Original air date: November 27, 1995

Guest appearances
- Andrew J. Robinson as Garak; Kenneth Marshall as Michael Eddington; Max Grodénchik as Rom; Melissa Young as Caprice; Marci Brickhouse as Mona Luvsitt

Episode chronology
← Previous "The Sword of Kahless"	Next → "Homefront"
- Star Trek: Deep Space Nine season 4

"Our Man Bashir" is the 82nd episode of the American science fiction television series Star Trek: Deep Space Nine, the tenth of the fourth season. It originally aired on November 27, 1995, in broadcast syndication. Directed by Winrich Kolbe, the story originated from a pitch by Assistant Script Coordinator Robert Gillan and was turned into a script by producer Ronald D. Moore. Both hairdressing in the episode and the score by Jay Chattaway were later nominated for Emmy Awards. The episode's plot involves the combination of two much-used Star Trek plot devices: a transporter accident and a holodeck malfunction.

Set in the 24th century, the series follows the adventures on Deep Space Nine, a space station located near a stable wormhole between the Alpha and Gamma quadrants of the Milky Way Galaxy. In this episode, Dr. Julian Bashir (Alexander Siddig) plays a 1960s secret agent in a holosuite game, accompanied by his friend Garak (Andrew Robinson), who is himself a former spy. After a transporter accident, the physical likenesses of several crew members are temporarily stored as characters in the holosuite memory; Bashir and Garak must prevent any of them from dying in the game or else they will be lost to the real world.

The production team had deliberately avoided episodes centering on holodeck malfunctions as they felt they had been overused on Star Trek: The Next Generation. However, Gillan pitched the circumstances that caused the issue seen in the episode and Moore came up with the 1960s setting. Although the episode takes its title from Our Man Flint, a major inspiration for the story was the James Bond films. This obvious influence resulted in Metro-Goldwyn-Mayer complaining to the studio, and later references to Bashir's holosuite game in the episode "A Simple Investigation" were toned down. "Our Man Bashir" received Nielsen ratings of 6.8 percent, and while the episode was mostly praised by reviewers, with particular attention paid to the performance of Avery Brooks, there was some criticism levelled at the depiction of women.

== Plot ==
Dr. Julian Bashir is playing a holosuite game in which he portrays a glamorous secret agent in 1964. His friend Elim Garak, a former spy, tags along. Meanwhile, the other officers of Deep Space Nine are rescued from the explosion of a runabout by Cmdr. Eddington, who beams them out in the nick of time. The transporter is damaged by the explosion, and Eddington must store their patterns in the station's computer memory. Their physical patterns end up in the computer controlling the holosuite, appearing as characters in Bashir's simulation. Eddington informs Bashir that he can't shut down the program or let the characters die, or else the patterns of the crew members may be deleted. Making matters worse, the holosuite safeties are disabled, meaning Bashir and Garak could be hurt or killed by the game.

In the game, a Russian spy, Anastasia Komananov, appears with Major Kira's likeness. Komananov explains that a mad scientist, Dr. Noah, is kidnapping elite scientists; Bashir's orders are to rescue Professor Honey Bare (Jadzia Dax). After escaping the assassin Falcon (Miles O'Brien), Bashir, Garak and Komananov go to a casino to speak to Noah's associate Duchamps (Worf). After a game of baccarat, Duchamps drugs the trio, knocking them out.

They awaken in Dr. Noah's lair on Mount Everest. Noah (Captain Sisko) explains his plan to flood the rest of the world, wiping out the human race except for his kidnapped scientists. He has Bashir and Garak handcuffed to an underground laser that will flood the chamber with lava in five minutes. As the time ticks down, Bashir flirts with Prof. Bare, and she slips him a key. Bashir frees himself and Garak, who protests that continuing the simulation is too dangerous. Garak is about to close the program, potentially killing the other crew members, when Bashir shoots him, grazing him with a bullet. Garak is shocked, but impressed, and agrees to continue.

They burst into Noah's study, and Eddington tells them he will attempt to rescue Sisko and the others in two minutes. To gain time, Bashir hits the button to activate Noah's plan, flooding the Earth. As he had not expected to actually win, the shocked Dr. Noah is still about to shoot Bashir, but before he can pull the trigger, Eddington beams the crew's patterns out of the holosuite. Bashir and Garak end the program with relief, Garak commenting that Bashir "saved the day by destroying the world".

== Production ==
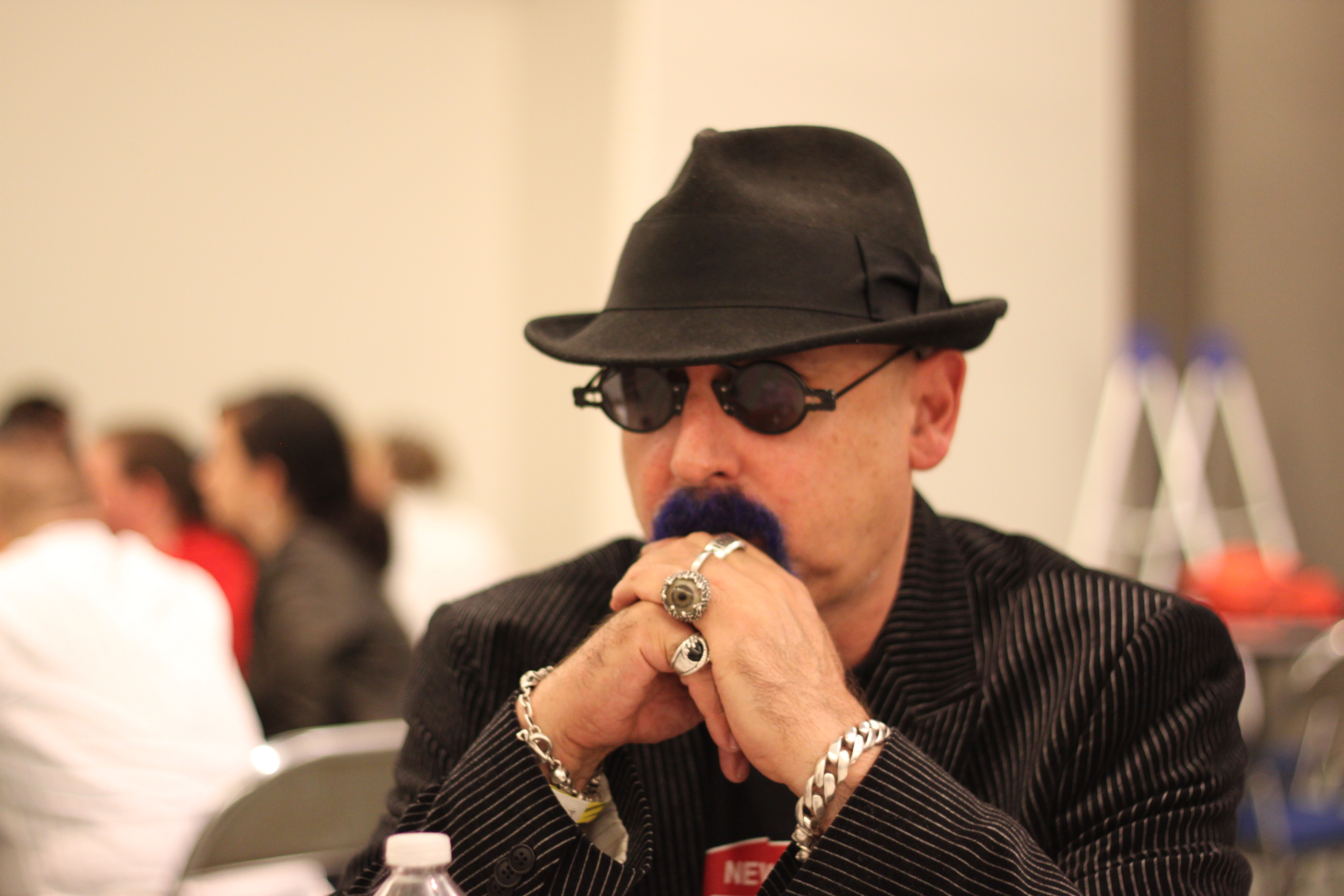
Producer Ira Steven Behr wanted a holodeck episode for Deep Space Nine that was different from any seen on The Next Generation.

Story editor René Echevarria was keen not to have a damaged holodeck story appear, as he felt it had been overdone in Star Trek: The Next Generation. It was specified in the information sheet sent to freelance writers that Deep Space Nine was not accepting stories involving malfunctioning holodecks. Producer Ira Steven Behr explained that the show had been looking for a unique holodeck story that would be specifically for Deep Space Nine rather than Sherlock Holmes and Dixon Hill detective stories seen in The Next Generation. Whilst Bashir and O'Brien's adventures in the holosuites in the Battle of Britain and the Battle of Clontarf have been mentioned in episodes, they were simply too expensive to be shown on screen effectively. But Behr felt that the story for "Our Man Bashir" was within the budget of the show.

The story was initially pitched to Echevarria by Robert Gillan, who was on the staff of Deep Space Nine as Assistant Script Coordinator. Echevarria was immediately convinced, and told Behr about the story who was equally as enthusiastic. In Gillan's original pitch, there wasn't a specific setting clearly set out, but Behr and Echevarria were sold on the idea that nothing went wrong with the holosuites — it was simply where the computer decided to store the information following a transporter accident.

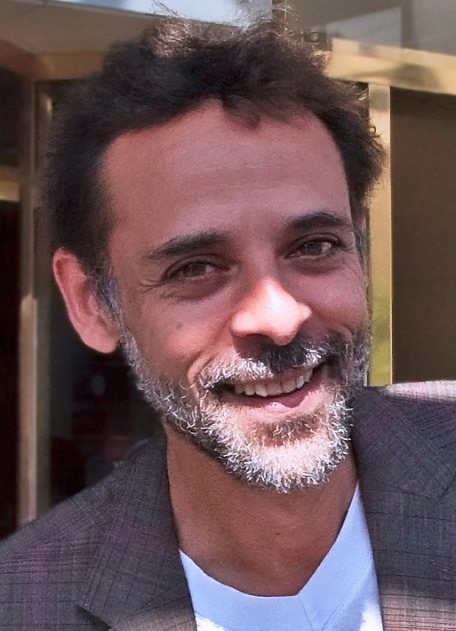
Julian Bashir, played by Alexander Siddig, was the central character in this episode.

Producer Ronald D. Moore came up with the 1960s spy setting, as he felt it was appropriate since Garak was a spy for the Cardassian Obsidian Order. He wrote the teleplay, and based it on a variety of sources including James Bond, Our Man Flint, The Man from U.N.C.L.E., and The Wild Wild West. He later explained that he "loved all of them as a kid. They had a certain panache. I loved writing that episode." Some of the elements were suggested by other staff members, with Robert Wolfe naming Colonel Anastasia Komananov and Behr changing Suzie Luvsitt to Mona Luvsitt.

Production and release of the episode coincided with the return of the James Bond film series after its longest ever hiatus, from 1989 to 1995: GoldenEye opened in U.S. theatres on November 17, 1995, ten days before "Our Man Bashir" first aired. Metro-Goldwyn-Mayer was later not pleased with the James Bond-style approach, and when Bashir's spy program appeared in the later episode "A Simple Investigation", the references were more generic.

"Our Man Bashir" was the longest shoot of any single episode of Deep Space Nine, taking nine days to film instead of the normal seven. The episode required a great deal of stunt work and special equipment, such as stuntmen going through tempered glass instead of sugar glass because of the better glass breaking effect. There was a great deal of new sets used as well, which each took longer to set up camera and lighting for as the crew were not as familiar with them as the standing sets. The backdrop used for Mount Everest was rented, but the crew realised it lacked snow so they had to modify it and then return it to the original condition afterwards. The majority of the 1960s style technologies such as Dr. Noah's base, were all custom built in house and where parts moved they were generally manually operated off screen. Art director Herman Zimmerman said that "Everything that could be manually operated was, because the brain is still smarter than most computers and you can still do some things faster by hand."

Dennis Madalone managed to save some time during the production as one of the shots involved Bashir seeing Falcon approach him from behind by seeing his reflection in a bottle of champagne. After time was already scheduled to attempt the shot, Madalone explained to the director that he could take the filmed sequence and digitally manipulate it onto the bottle. Madalone was also responsible for firing a cork from a bottle at Colm Meaney's head from off screen to make it appear as if Bashir did it, and managed to do it on the first take.

== Reception ==
"Our Man Bashir" was first broadcast on November 27, 1995, in broadcast syndication. It received Nielsen ratings of 6.8 percent, placing it in eighth place in its timeslot and lower than the episode that aired the previous week, "The Sword of Kahless", which gained a rating of 6.9 percent. "Our Man Bashir" was the final new episode of Deep Space Nine to air in 1995, with repeats running until "Homefront" aired on January 1, 1996, with ratings of 6.8 percent.

Zack Handlen of The A.V. Club compared "Our Man Bashir" to "Little Green Men" from earlier in the season, saying that this episode was "better paced". Another comparison made was to The Next Generation's "Hollow Pursuits", saying that "instead of [Reginald] Barclay using the holodeck to enact his fantasies with people he can't bear to deal with in real life, Bashir is forced to keep his made up world going if he wants to save the lives of his friends". Handlen also praised the relationship between Bashir and Garak in the episode, and said "Our Man Bashir" demonstrates their characterisation. In Michelle Erica Green's review for TrekNation, she criticised the role of women in the episode, saying that they fared better in the James Bond movies. She also thought that taking the out-of-character element of the episode repeated elements seen in several episodes during the previous season, but praised the acting on the part of Avery Brooks and that Garak was "born to play a Bond sidekick".

Keith DeCandido, writing for Tor.com, said that it was obvious that the actors enjoyed their new parts in this episode and said of the episode, "holy crap is it fun". In particular, he praised both Avery Brooks and Nana Visitor in their Bond-esque roles, saying that Brooks made a villain on par with those played by Donald Pleasence, Christopher Lee, and Javier Bardem. DeCandido gave "Our Man Bashir" a rating of nine out of ten. In a list of the top 100 episodes of the Star Trek franchise, "Our Man Bashir" was placed in 77th place by Charlie Jane Anders at io9. She noted it as being one of goofiest Deep Space Nine episodes.

In 2012, Den of Geek ranked this the seventh best episode of Star Trek: Deep Space Nine.

A 2015 binge-watching guide for Star Trek: Deep Space Nine by WIRED recommended not skipping this essential episode.

In 2016, Empire ranked this the 23rd best out of the top 50 episodes of all the 700 plus Star Trek television episodes.

In 2016, The Hollywood Reporter rated "Our Man Bashir" the 87th best episode of all Star Trek episodes.

In 2020, Io9 said this was one of the "must watch" episodes from the series.

=== Awards ===
The episode was nominated for two Emmy Awards, in the categories "Outstanding Music Composition for a Series" (for the score by Jay Chattaway) and "Outstanding Hairstyling for a Series".

== Home media release ==
The first home media release of "Our Man Bashir" was as a two-episode VHS cassette alongside "The Sword of Kahless" in the United Kingdom on June 13, 1996, followed in the United States and Canada by a single-episode release on October 3, 2000. It was later released on DVD as part of the season four box set on August 5, 2003.

== Legacy ==
Kim Sherwood's 2022 novel Double or Nothing, which was commissioned by the Ian Fleming estate and is set in the world of James Bond, is about an agent named "Sid Bashir"; Sherwood has confirmed that this is a reference to the character of Julian Bashir and the actor Alexander Siddig, and further noted that "Our Man Bashir" was her first exposure to the James Bond franchise.
