= Wind and fire wheels =

Melee weapon

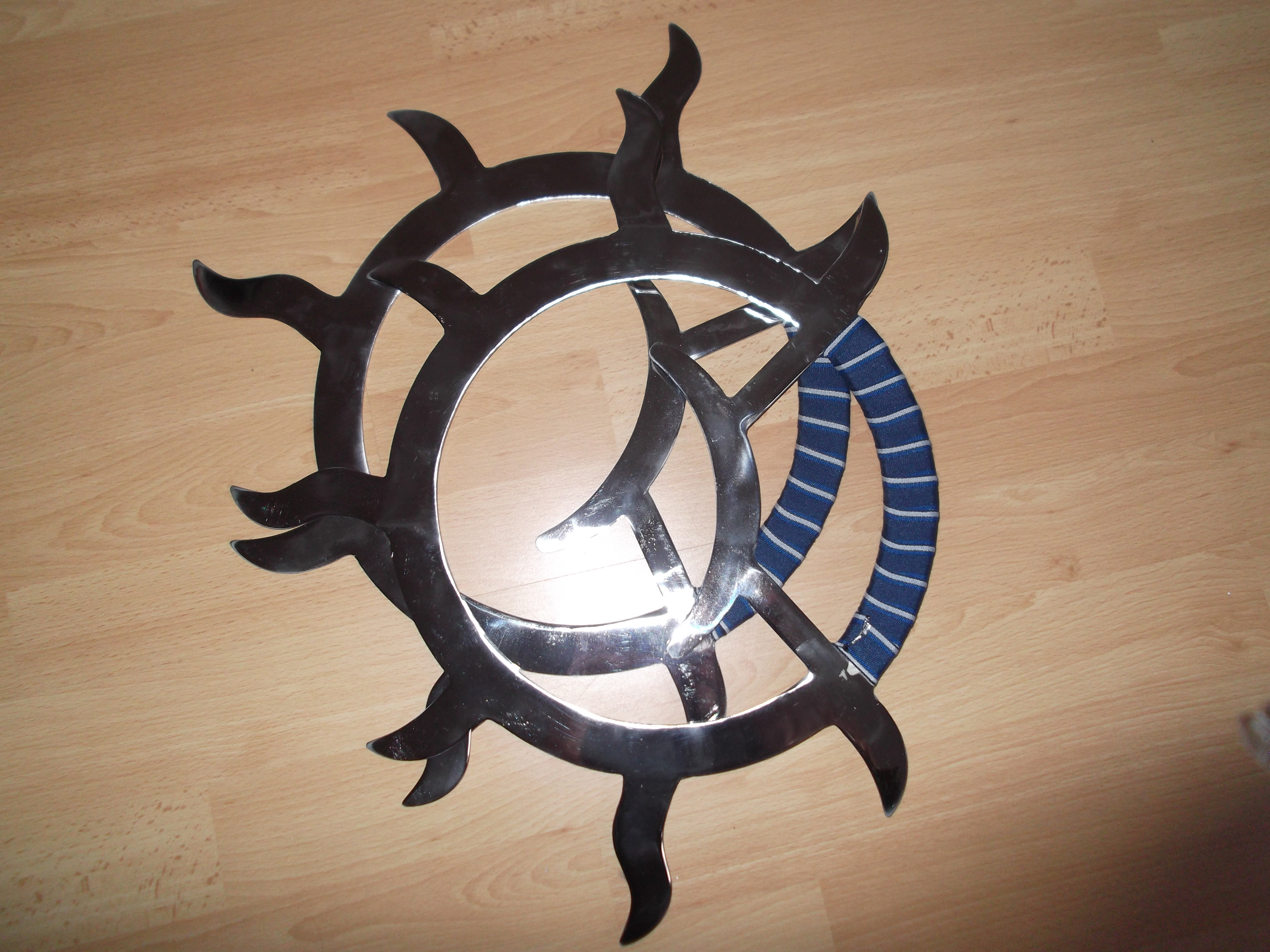
A matched set of two wind-and-fire wheels

Wind-and-fire wheels (simplified Chinese: 风火轮; traditional Chinese: 風火輪; pinyin: fēnghuǒlún) are melee weapons, wielded as a pair, and associated with Chinese martial arts, primarily baguazhang.

Each wheel is a flat metal ring approximately 38 cm (15 in) in diameter. One quarter-segment has a padded grip with a cross-guard; the other three segments have protruding flame-styled blades. With one wheel in each hand, the practitioner can slash, stab, parry, or disarm an opponent.

In the mythological story Fengshen Yanyi, the Immortal Taiyi gave Nezha a wind-wheel and a fire-wheel. These were stood on whilst chanting incantations, to serve as a magic vehicle.

== See also ==
- List of martial arts weapons
- Baguazhang
- Deer horn knives
- Chakram
