= Errand of Mercy =

- Star Trek: The Original Series episode
- Episode no.: Season 1 Episode 26
- Directed by: John Newland
- Written by: Gene L. Coon
- Cinematography by: Jerry Finnerman
- Production code: 026
- Original air date: March 23, 1967

Guest appearances
- John Colicos – Commander Kor; John Abbott – Ayelborne; David Hillary Hughes – Trefayne; Peter Brocco – Claymare; Victor Lundin – Lieutenant; George Sawaya – Second Soldier; Walt Davis – Klingon Soldier; Bobby Bass – Klingon Guard; Eddie Paskey – Lt. Leslie; Gary Combs – Klingon Guard

Episode chronology
← Previous "The Devil in the Dark"	Next → "The Alternative Factor"
- Star Trek: The Original Series season 1

"Errand of Mercy" is the twenty-sixth episode of the first season of the American science fiction television series Star Trek. Written by Gene L. Coon and directed by John Newland, it was first broadcast on March 23, 1967. It was the first episode in which the Klingons appeared.

In the episode, with a war with the Klingons declared, Captain Kirk and his First Officer, Mr. Spock, attempt to sway the incomprehensibly placid population of a planet near the Klingon border to resist an invading military occupation.

The Klingon governor, Kor (played by John Colicos), would return in the Star Trek: The Animated Series episode "The Time Trap" voiced by James Doohan. He would return again decades later in the Star Trek: Deep Space Nine episodes "Blood Oath", "The Sword of Kahless" and "Once More Unto the Breach". In "The Sword of Kahless", Worf mentions Kor's encounter with Kirk.

== Plot ==
Negotiations between the United Federation of Planets and the Klingon Empire have collapsed, and the USS Enterprise is sent to the world of Organia, a non-aligned planet near the Klingon border, to prevent the Klingons from taking advantage of its strategic location. As the Enterprise approaches Organia, the ship is attacked and destroys a Klingon vessel.

Upon arriving on the planet's surface, Kirk and Spock find a peaceful but technologically primitive town. Kirk appeals to Ayelborne, the head of the local council, to allow the Federation to help them resist Klingon occupation, but the Organians adamantly oppose any use of violence. When a Klingon fleet appears in orbit, Kirk orders the Enterprise to withdraw, which strands himself and Spock on the planet.

Ayelborne disguises Kirk and Spock to avoid suspicion and the Klingons seize control of the planet without resistance, installing the ranking Klingon officer, Kor, as the military governor. Kor has Spock questioned with a "mind sifter" device to confirm he is not a spy and designates Kirk as the Organian civilian liaison with the occupation force. Spock uses his mental discipline to withstand the scrutiny of the device.

That evening, in an attempt to inspire the Organians, Spock and Kirk sabotage a munitions dump outside the town. Ayelborne reveals the true identities of the Federation officers to Kor. He and the council then mysteriously free the two before the Klingons can torture information out of them. While Kirk and Spock try to comprehend the council's contradictory actions, Kor orders the execution of two hundred Organians, yet the council seems unmoved.

As the Federation and Klingon fleets ready themselves for a confrontation in the system, Kirk and Spock raid the Klingon headquarters in hopes of rousing the population into resistance. They capture Kor and prepare to make a last stand. The Organians then reveal their true nature: they are highly advanced incorporeal beings. They instantly incapacitate both sides, forcing them to agree to a cessation of hostilities. The Organians predict that the two sides will work together in the future.

== Production ==
Story editor D.C. Fontana said she thought the Romulans were much more interesting than the Klingons, but the Klingons were chosen as the regular adversaries of the series because they did not need any special make-up like the pointed ears for the Romulans.

The Klingons' dark-skinned, mustachioed look was the idea of John Colicos, who played Kor. Make-up artist Fred Phillips agreed that they should have a "Genghis Khan" look. In Gene L. Coon's script, the Klingons were described as simply "oriental. Hard-faced."

A view of a citadel at the beginning of Act One in the episode features a stock footage shot of the Citadelle Laferrière in Haiti. While the script originally called for a matte painting, using the stock footage proved to be more cost-effective.

== Reception ==
Zack Handlen of The A.V. Club gave the episode a 'B+' rating, describing it as "fun" but noting "logical holes throughout".

Hollywood.com said "Errand of Mercy" was among the best of Star Trek episodes about the Klingons, noting in this episode the war-craving Klingons thought the Organians were peasants. A ranking of every episode of the original series by Hollywood placed this episode 25th out of 79 episodes.

In a review of fictional Star Trek aliens in 2018 by CBR, the Organians were noted as a powerful species. They were particularly impressed with the Organian character Trefayne, who was one of the Organian council members that talks to Kirk.

In 2016, SyFy ranked guest star John Colicos's performance as Kor (the Klingon leader), as the 13th best guest star on the original series. Colicos went on to reprise his role as Kor decades later on the Star Trek spin-off Star Trek: Deep Space Nine. The franchise was trying to do numerous cross-overs whenever possible to enhance continuity. Directors were happy with enhancements to continuity, such as actors reprising their roles as characters the audience was already familiar with. Being consistent with continuity and bringing back old characters meant the audience would feel familiar with what was being presented.

A 2018 Star Trek binge-watching guide by Den of Geek recommended this episode as part of the "foundations of Star Trek".

== In popular culture ==
The 1988 song "What's on Your Mind (Pure Energy)" by American synth-pop band Information Society uses a sample of Leonard Nimoy's voice from this episode. Nimoy's son Adam facilitated this. The same sample was used in the 2018 song "Dame Tu Cosita" by El Chombo and Cutty Ranks.

== See also ==
- Observer Effect (Star Trek: Enterprise)
