= Galaxy's Child =

- Star Trek: The Next Generation episode
- Episode no.: Season 4 Episode 16
- Directed by: Winrich Kolbe
- Story by: Thomas Kartozian
- Teleplay by: Maurice Hurley
- Production code: 190
- Original air date: March 11, 1991

Guest appearances
- Susan Gibney - Leah Brahms; Lanei Chapman - Sariel Rager; Jana Marie Hupp - Pavlik; Whoopi Goldberg - Guinan

Episode chronology
← Previous "First Contact"	Next → "Night Terrors"
- Star Trek: The Next Generation season 4

"Galaxy's Child " is the 90th episode of the American science fiction television series Star Trek: The Next Generation, the 16th episode of the fourth season. It was originally released on March 11, 1991, in broadcast syndication.

Set in the 24th century, the series follows the adventures of the Starfleet crew of the Federation starship Enterprise-D. In this episode, Chief Engineer Geordi La Forge is thrilled when Dr. Leah Brahms comes aboard the Enterprise.

Unfortunately, Brahms is nothing like the idealized holographic version La Forge fell for a year earlier, in the third season episode "Booby Trap". She is cold and humorless, not to mention married. To make matters worse, after she inadvertently discovers La Forge's holodeck program, he is the last person she wants to associate with. The situation becomes more complicated when the Enterprise becomes the reluctant nursemaid to a young space-faring entity draining the ship of its energy.

The episode was panned by some critics for its depiction of La Forge's relationship with Brahms, though Patrick Stewart received praise for his performance and portrayal of Captain Picard's relationship with the entity.

== Plot ==
The Enterprise welcomes aboard Dr. Leah Brahms, a lead designer of the Galaxy-class starship engines. Chief Engineer Geordi La Forge, who also had previously used a lifelike holodeck simulation of Brahms to help save the Enterprise in "Booby Trap", is excited to meet her, but is frustrated when she complains about modifications he has made to the engines of the Enterprise. La Forge also learns that Brahms is married, a fact not noted in the holodeck simulation. Brahms learns how La Forge previously saved the Enterprise, and asks another crewman to show her the simulation. Alarmed, La Forge tries to stop her but is too late. Brahms discovers the holodeck simulation and accuses La Forge of invading her privacy.

Meanwhile, the Enterprise is attacked by a strange space-faring creature that is nearly the size of the ship. Taking defensive action, Captain Picard orders a low-power phaser burst on the creature, inadvertently killing it. Scanning the creature, Data finds another smaller entity inside of it, and the crew realizes the larger creature only attacked to protect its unborn. The crew performs a Cesarean section, using the ship's phasers as a scalpel to free the newborn. As the ship turns to leave, the newborn attaches itself to the ship and begins feeding off its power systems, imprinting on the Enterprise as if it were the creature's mother. As the ship's power supplies run low, the crew finds a nearby debris field toward which the larger creature appeared to have been traveling, and realize it would serve as a better feeding ground for the infant.

After the crew arrives at the debris field on the last of the ship's power reserves, they find they are unable to dislodge the creature. Worse, they also discover the creature is emitting radio signals attracting more of its kind from the debris field, and they are heading straight toward the Enterprise. La Forge and Brahms put aside their differences and devise a solution: altering the frequency of energy to "sour the milk", causing the infant to leave the ship and join the other creatures. As the Enterprise's power is restored, La Forge and Brahms make up and determine they can still be friends.

== Production ==
This episode had a mix of model and early CGI work to create the 'space tadpoles'. The adult was a physical model made by Tony Meininger. However, the baby was done with a CGI model created by Rhythm & Hues.

== Reception ==
Zack Handlen gave a critical review of "Galaxy's Child" for the Onion's The A.V. Club giving it a C+ rating. Handlen wrote, "I'm pretty sure this isn't a classic; I'm also pretty sure that it has some serious problems. ... The primary issue here ... is that we should be sympathetic to Geordi's mistakes here, and I don't think we're given good reason to be."

A Den of Geek reviewer gave the episode a mixed review, writing, "If nothing else, you can safely say that this episode is well-structured and has some interesting ideas, and that the chemistry between Brahms and LaForge is pretty good in its own right, even though it's working from an untenable premise that nothing he did was wrong or particularly weird."

Keith DeCandido gave the episode a rating of 3 out of 10 for Tor.com, praising the science fiction plot and Patrick Stewart's acting, but criticizing the plot with Geordi and Leah Brahms as being "morally reprehensible".

Writing for Trek Nation, Michelle Green argued the storyline involving Picard's relationship with the alien was the episode's redeeming grace. "That's what makes this episode palatable to me, because otherwise we're treading close once again to derailing serious drama with puerile sexual relations," Green wrote. "Couldn't we have had a bit more celebration of her genius rather than a pity party for LaForge and his fantasies of the girl of his dreams?"

== Home video ==
On May 28, 1996, episodes "First Contact" and "Galaxy's Child" were released on LaserDisc in the United States. Published by Paramount Home Video, the single 12" double sided disc retailed for 34.95 USD. The disc video was NTSC format with a Dolby Surround audio track.

This episode was released in the United States on September 3, 2002, as part of the Star Trek: The Next Generation season four DVD box set.

== See also ==
- Bioship (spacecraft)
- "Emergence" (Star Trek: The Next Generation)
- "Tin Man" (Star Trek: The Next Generation)
