= Paradise Lost (Star Trek: Deep Space Nine) =

- Star Trek: Deep Space Nine episode
- Episode no.: Season 4 Episode 12
- Directed by: Reza Badiyi
- Story by: Ronald D. Moore
- Teleplay by: Ira Steven Behr; Robert Hewitt Wolfe
- Production code: 484
- Original air date: January 8, 1996

Guest appearances
- Brock Peters as Joseph Sisko; Robert Foxworth as Leyton; Herschel Sparber as Jaresh-Inyo; Susan Gibney as Benteen; David Drew Gallagher as Riley Shepard; Aron Eisenberg as Nog

Episode chronology
| ← Previous "Homefront" | Next → "Crossfire" |
- Star Trek: Deep Space Nine season 4

"Paradise Lost" is the 84th episode of the television series Star Trek: Deep Space Nine, the 12th episode of the fourth season. It is the second part of a two-part episode, following on from the preceding episode, "Homefront."

Set in the 24th century, the series follows the adventures of the crew of the fictional space station Deep Space Nine, managed by the United Federation of Planets, which lies adjacent to a wormhole connecting the Alpha and Gamma Quadrants of the galaxy. The Gamma Quadrant is home to the Dominion, a hostile empire ruled by the shape-shifting Changelings. In "Homefront", Deep Space Nine's captain Benjamin Sisko is brought to Earth to assist Admiral Leyton with planetary security after a terrorist attack on the planet is apparently perpetrated by Changelings; while there, he visits his father, who runs a restaurant in New Orleans. In this episode, Sisko uncovers Leyton's attempt at a coup d'état to seize power for Starfleet, the Federation's military.

== Plot ==
Earth has been placed under martial law due to a seemingly imminent Dominion invasion, but Sisko believes that there is more going on than meets the eye. With the aid of Deep Space Nine's security officer Odo, and Cadet Nog's connections with an elite and selective group of cadets at Starfleet Academy, Sisko gathers evidence that Admiral Leyton is planning a coup d'état. He takes the information to the Federation's president, Jaresh-Inyo; however, Jaresh-Inyo is hesitant to act in the absence of concrete evidence.

Sisko is confronted by a Changeling in the guise of Miles O'Brien, a DS9 crew member. He tells Sisko there are actually only a total of four Changelings on Earth, and mockingly points out to Sisko how much panic they have caused, drastically out of proportion to their actual numbers.

Sisko contacts Major Kira, second in command on DS9, to uncover the evidence Jaresh-Inyo needs: a Starfleet officer on DS9, Lieutenant Arriaga, has been manipulating the wormhole at Leyton's behest to create the impression that a cloaked Dominion fleet is en route to Earth. Before he can present the evidence to Jaresh-Inyo, Leyton has Sisko framed as being a Changeling and imprisoned. Odo breaks Sisko out of prison.

The crew of DS9 is en route to Earth on the USS Defiant, bringing Arriaga to confess to the conspiracy. In order to prevent Arriaga's evidence from reaching Earth, Leyton orders the USS Lakota to intercept, telling the crew that the Defiant is crewed by Changelings. When the Lakota fires on the Defiant, Lt. Cmdr. Worf, in command of the Defiant, has no choice but to return fire. Outmatched by the Defiant's superior armor and firepower, the Lakota is on the brink of destruction when Leyton orders them to destroy the Defiant. As Sisko confronts Leyton with a phaser, the captain of the Lakota, Captain Benteen, refuses orders to destroy the Defiant and stands down, allowing the Defiant on its way. With his conspiracy falling apart, Leyton resigns, and the state of emergency is lifted.

== Reception ==
In 2016, The Hollywood Reporter rated the two-part episode consisting of "Homefront" and "Paradise Lost" as the 22nd best episode of Star Trek overall, praising how the episode "quietly drives home the scale of the danger facing humanity" and the casting of Brock Peters as Joseph Sisko.

In 2014, Keith R.A. DeCandido reviewed the episode for Tor.com, giving it a rating of six out of ten. He noted the episode's exploration of situational ethics, and the two-parter's similarity to the film Seven Days in May.

In 2018, CBR rated "Homefront" and "Paradise Lost" as the 16th best multi-episode story in the Star Trek franchise.

In 2020, io9 listed this and "Homefront" as "must-watch" episodes of the series, describing the plot as a "dark, moral dilemma".
