= Once More unto the Breach (Star Trek: Deep Space Nine) =

- Star Trek: Deep Space Nine episode
- Episode no.: Season 7 Episode 7
- Directed by: Allan Kroeker
- Written by: Ronald D. Moore
- Production code: 557
- Original air date: November 9, 1998

Guest appearances
- John Colicos as Kor; J. G. Hertzler as General Martok; Neil Vipond as Darok; Nancy Youngblut as Kolana; Blake Lindsley as Synon; Mark Allen Shepherd as Morn

Episode chronology
← Previous "Treachery, Faith, and the Great River"	Next → "The Siege of AR-558"
- Star Trek: Deep Space Nine season 7

"Once More unto the Breach" is the 157th episode of the television series Star Trek: Deep Space Nine, the seventh episode of the seventh season. This episode received a Nielsen rating of 4.5 when it was broadcast on television in 1998.

Set in the 24th century, the series follows the adventures of the crew of the Starfleet-managed Bajoran space station Deep Space Nine; the later seasons of the series follow a war between the United Federation of Planets and an empire known as the Dominion. This episode focuses on the Klingons, an alien species introduced as enemies of the Federation in Star Trek: The Original Series, but now allied with them against the Dominion; in the episode, the elderly Klingon warrior Kor hopes for a chance to end his life with dignity by serving honorably in the war.

The episode featured John Colicos reprising his role as Kor; J. G. Hertzler in his recurring role as the Klingon General Martok; and Neil C. Vipond, Nancy Youngblut, and Blake Lindsley in supporting roles.

== Plot ==
The famous warrior Kor, aging and increasingly senile, has lost influence in the Klingon Empire. He comes to DS9 to ask his friend Worf, the only Klingon in Starfleet, for help in securing a posting on a Klingon vessel, and thus a chance for an honorable death in battle. Worf brings the request to General Martok, who angrily rejects it: Kor once rejected Martok's application to become an officer based on Martok's lower-class lineage, and the general still holds a grudge. As a compromise, Worf appoints Kor as the third officer of the Ch'tang, Martok's ship, for a raid into Dominion space.

Once aboard, Kor recounts old war stories to a crew enthused with having a living legend among them. However, this changes after the first battle, when Martok and Worf are temporarily incapacitated and Kor is forced to take command. Kor's senility causes him to relive an old battle and give nonsensical commands. Disaster is averted when Martok and Worf recover and resume command.

Kor's pride is severely hurt as Martok and much of the crew mock him. Worf is forced to remove Kor from duty, but blames himself for placing him in an untenable situation. Martok also realizes mocking Kor has brought him no pleasure. The pair agree to appeal to Chancellor Gowron to find a worthy and suitable place for Kor.

As the Klingons return to friendly space, they discover ten Dominion ships are in pursuit and will intercept them before they reach safety. Worf prepares to embark on a suicide mission in one vessel to delay the pursuers, and allow the remaining Klingon ships to escape. Kor learns of Worf's plan from Martok's aide Darok, a Klingon of Kor's age who is sympathetic to his plight. Kor's pride is rekindled when he realizes only his lifetime of experience can make the plan work. It is also the warrior's death he has longed for. Kor sedates Worf and takes his place on the mission, assuring Worf that when he reaches the halls of the honored dead, he will find Worf's late wife Jadzia Dax and tell her that Worf still loves her.

Martok and his crew observe the battle from the Ch'tang. Against the odds, Kor succeeds in delaying the enemy. Martok is the first to toast Kor's bravery, and the crew sing to Kor's victory.

== Naming ==
The title "Once More unto the Breach" is derived from Shakespeare's play Henry V; it is one of several Star Trek episodes with titles based on Shakespeare.

== Franchise connections ==
John Colicos first played the Klingon Kor in "Errand of Mercy", an episode of Star Trek: The Original Series first broadcast in 1967. On Deep Space Nine, he first reprised the role in the episode "Blood Oath", appearing alongside other actors who had played Klingons in The Original Series. His second appearance on Deep Space Nine was in the episode "The Sword of Kahless".

== Reception ==
In 2012, Den of Geek ranked this the second-best episode of Star Trek: Deep Space Nine.

In 2013, Hollywood.com noted this episode as among the best of Star Trek's Klingon content, highlighting it as a satisfying end for Kor.

The Hollywood Reporter ranked "Once More unto the Breach" as the 13th best episode of Star Trek: Deep Space Nine.

Writing for Tor.com in 2014, Keith R. A. DeCandido gave the episode a favorable review, with a rating of 9 out of 10.
