= Homefront (Star Trek: Deep Space Nine) =

- Star Trek: Deep Space Nine episode
- Episode no.: Season 4 Episode 11
- Directed by: David Livingston
- Written by: Ira Steven Behr; Robert Hewitt Wolfe
- Production code: 483
- Original air date: January 1, 1996

Guest appearances
- Aron Eisenberg as Nog; Brock Peters as Joseph Sisko; Susan Gibney as Benteen; Robert Foxworth as Leyton

Episode chronology
← Previous "Our Man Bashir"	Next → "Paradise Lost"
- Star Trek: Deep Space Nine season 4

"Homefront" is the 83rd episode of the television series Star Trek: Deep Space Nine, the 11th episode of the fourth season. It is the first part of a two-part episode, continued by the following episode, "Paradise Lost." The episode was directed by David Livingston, and was written by Ira Steven Behr and Robert Hewitt Wolfe.

Set in the 24th century, the series follows the adventures of the crew of the fictional space station Deep Space Nine, managed by the United Federation of Planets, which lies adjacent to a wormhole connecting the Alpha and Gamma Quadrants of the galaxy. The Gamma Quadrant is home to the Dominion, a hostile empire ruled by the shape-shifting Changelings. In this episode, Deep Space Nine's captain Benjamin Sisko is brought to Earth to assist Admiral Leyton with planetary security after a terrorist attack on the planet is apparently perpetrated by Changelings; while there, he visits his father, who runs a restaurant in New Orleans.

== Plot ==
When 27 people are killed at a diplomatic conference being held in Antwerp on Earth, and evidence implicates the Changelings, Captain Sisko travels to Earth to investigate what looks like a bold new offensive by the Dominion that could be a prelude to war. He is accompanied by security officer Odo, a Changeling who opposes the Dominion. Sisko also brings along his son Jake, taking advantage of the opportunity to visit his father, a restaurateur in New Orleans. Due to Sisko's experience dealing with Changelings, Vice-Admiral Leyton puts him in charge of planetary security; together they persuade the President of the Federation to introduce new security measures on Earth, hoping to be prepared if the Changelings attack again. Meanwhile, Jake's friend Nog, a cadet at Starfleet Academy, asks Captain Sisko to help him become a member of the Red Squad, an elite and selective group of cadets.

With the Dominion threat ever looming, paranoia begins to grow, especially after Odo catches a Changeling impersonating Leyton. Even Sisko momentarily suspects his own father of being a Changeling when he is unwilling to submit to a blood test. As matters escalate, all the power on Earth is knocked out, and sabotage is believed to be the cause. Sisko and Leyton decide to prepare Earth for war, and they convince the President to declare a state of emergency on Earth. As the episode ends, Jake and his grandfather witness armed Starfleet security personnel begin patrolling the streets of New Orleans.

== Critical response ==
In 2016, The Hollywood Reporter rated the two-part episode consisting of "Homefront" and "Paradise Lost" as the 22nd best episode of Star Trek overall, praising how the episode "quietly drives home the scale of the danger facing humanity" and the casting of Brock Peters as Joseph Sisko.

In 2017, Business Insider listed "Homefront" as one of the most underrated episodes of the Star Trek franchise at that time. They praise the episode for examining how quickly paranoia can escalate when fear of an enemy takes hold.

In 2017, ScreenRant ranked this episode paired with "Paradise Lost" the 12th darkest episode(s) of the Star Trek franchise.

In 2018, CBR rated "Homefront", together with following episode "Paradise Lost", as the 16th best multi episode story of Star Trek.

In 2020, io9 listed this and "Paradise Lost" as "must-watch" episodes of the series, describing the plot as a "dark, moral dilemma".
