= Susan Gibney =

American actress (born 1961)

- Born: September 11, 1961 (age 65); Manhattan Beach, California, U.S.
- Education: Empire State College (BA); Yale University (MFA)
- Occupations: Film, theatre, and television actor
- Years active: 1988–2015, 2022
- Known for: Crossing Jordan; Happy Family; The Fearing Mind; Booby Trap; Galaxy's Child; We Are Still Here
- Children: 2

Susan Gibney (born September 11, 1961) is an American former actress.

== Early life and education ==
Gibney was born in Manhattan Beach, California. She moved to Webster, New York, at a young age and graduated in 1979 from Herbert W. Schroeder High School in Webster. Gibney returned to California several times, and back to Webster in 2004. She attended State University College at Buffalo with a major in theater and, after serving as a theater intern in New York City, finished her bachelor’s degree at Empire State College. She later earned a Master of Fine Arts degree from the Yale School of Drama.

== Career ==
On television, Gibney portrayed Maggie Harris on Happy Family, Janis Archer on Diagnosis: Murder, and Rene Walcott on Crossing Jordan. She appeared twice on Star Trek: The Next Generation as Dr. Leah Brahms, once in the episode "Booby Trap" and later in "Galaxy's Child". She also appeared on Star Trek: Deep Space Nine, in the episodes "Homefront" and "Paradise Lost", as Commander (later Captain) Erika Benteen. She was considered for the role of Captain Kathryn Janeway on Star Trek: Voyager, but did not get the role. She was later considered for the role of Seven of Nine and tested twice. She was also considered for the role of the Borg Queen in the film Star Trek: First Contact.

Post Star Trek, Gibney has appeared in a number of movies, the most critically acclaimed one being We Are Still Here, a 2015 American horror film written and directed by Ted Geoghegan.

In 2022 she reprised her role as Dr. Leah Brahms, in the Star Trek: Lower Decks episode "Mining the Mind's Mines."

== Filmography ==
=== Film ===
Year	Title	Role	Notes
1991	And You Thought Your Parents Were Weird	Alice Woods	
1992	The Waterdance	Cheryl Lynn	
1996	The Great White Hype	Vivian	
1997	Dinner and Driving	Barbara	
2001	Besotted	Vicky	
2002	Derailed	Madeline Kristoff	
2010	The Hammer	Janet Hamill	
2015	We Are Still Here	Maddie	

=== Television ===
Year	Title	Role	Notes
1988	Spenser: For Hire	Molly Sears	"McAllister"
1988	The Equalizer	Angela Drake	"Always a Lady"
1989	Columbo	Madge	"Sex and the Married Detective"
1989	Alien Nation	Harriet Beecher	"Fountain of Youth"
1989	L.A. Law	Lucy Blanchard	"Lie Down and Deliver"
1989–1991	Star Trek: The Next Generation	Dr. Leah Brahms	"Booby Trap" & "Galaxy's Child"
1994	One Life to Live	Dr. Grace Atherton	TV series
1994	New York Undercover	Karen	"Sins of the Father"
1994	Diagnosis: Murder	Genevieve Ducasse	"Death By Extermination"
1994–1999	Diagnosis: Murder	Det. Tanis Archer	Recurring role
1995	Due South	Suzanne Chapin	"You Must Remember This"
1995	Chicago Hope	Deputy D.A. Johnson	"Internal Affairs"
1995	The Larry Sanders Show	Kia	"I Was a Teenage Lesbian"
1995	Pride & Joy	Donna	"Genius"
1995–1996	The Client	Claudette Gaines	"Child's Play" & "Sympathy for the Devil"
1996	Star Trek: Deep Space Nine	Commander Erika Benteen	"Homefront"
1996	Star Trek: Deep Space Nine	Captain Erika Benteen	"Paradise Lost"
1996	Unforgivable	Beth French	TV film
1996	The Secret She Carried	Judy	TV film
1996	Bedtime	Liz	TV series
1997	The Cape	Sylvia	TV series
1997	JAG	Lt. Linda Nivens	"Trinity"
1998	The Pretender	Kim	"Hope & Prey"
1999	Evolution's Child	Beth Lider	TV film
1999	Nash Bridges	Melissa Toland	"Get Bananas"
1999	Diagnosis: Murder	Maya	"Gangland: Parts 1 & 2"
2000	Cabin by the Lake	Regan	TV film
2000	CSI: Crime Scene Investigation	Charlotte Meridian	"Pilot"
2000–2001	The Fearing Mind	Cynthia Fearing	Main role
2001	Night Visions	Natalie Doyle	"After Life"
2001	CSI: Crime Scene Investigation	Charlotte Meridian	"And Then There Were None"
2002	For the People	Susan	"Pawns"
2002	Judging Amy	Ms. Reilly	"Every Stranger's Face I See"
2002	Becker	Helen	"Chris-Mess"
2002–2007	Crossing Jordan	DA Renee Walcott	Recurring role
2003	24	Anna	"Day 2: 10:00 p.m.-11:00 p.m."
2003–2004	Happy Family	Maggie Harris	Main role
2004	Touching Evil	Dr. Elizabeth Walker	"Mercy"
2005	Criminal Minds	Dr. Linda Deaton	"Derailed"
2006	The Jake Effect	Gwen Carlyle	"Parent Teacher Conference"
2007	Standoff	Allison Lehman	"Lie to Me"
2008	Knight Rider	Jennifer	"Knight Rider"
2008	Lost	Dist. Atty. Melissa Dunbrook	"Eggtown"
2012	The Mentalist	Alice Burns	"Panama Red"
2022	Star Trek: Lower Decks	Dr. Leah Brahms	"Mining the Mind's Mines"

=== Theatre ===
Year	Title	Role	Notes
1992	Tartuffe	Dorine	Hartford Stage, Hartford, CT
1999	Indian Ink	Flora Crewe	American Conservatory Theater, Geary Theater, San Francisco, CA
2008	Tis Pity She's a Whore	Hippolita	American Conservatory Theater, Geary Theater, San Francisco, CA
