= The Fearing Mind =

American television series

- Genre: Anthology series Horror
- Created by: Billy Brown and Dan Angel
- Starring: Harry Van Gorkum; Susan Gibney; Katee Sackhoff
- Theme music composer: Duke McVinnie
- Composer: Terry Frewer
- Countries of origin: United States; Canada
- Original language: English
- No. of seasons: 1
- No. of episodes: 13 (6 unaired) (list of episodes)

Production
- Running time: 60 minutes
- Production companies: Angel/Brown Productions; The Jim Henson Company

Original release
- Network: Fox Family
- Release: October 21 – December 2, 2000

The Fearing Mind is an American horror television series that aired on the Fox Family Channel from October 21 until December 2, 2000.

== Premise ==
Bill Fearing, a famous writer of suspense thrillers, gets his ideas from things that happen in his family. When he gets an idea, the viewers enter his mind and see the gruesome events unfold.

== Cast ==
- Harry Van Gorkum as Bill Fearing
- Susan Gibney as Cynthia Fearing
- Katee Sackhoff as Lenore Fearing
- Rae Allen as Grandma Lucy
- John Fleck as Howard

== Episodes ==
No.	Title	Directed by	Written by	Original release date
1	"Sweet Meat"	John Patterson & Neill Fearnley	Dan Angel & Billy Brown	October 21, 2000
Bill worries about the intentions of Lenore's boyfriend and comes up with a story about killer ants.
2	"Good Harvest"	Jeff Woolnough	David Goldsmith	October 28, 2000
When a rival horror writer comes for a visit, Bill gets the story idea about a drifter who comes into a reclusive community where a blind girl is haunted by visions of her past.
3	"Upgrade"	Neill Fearnley	Bradley Thompson & David Weddle	November 4, 2000
Bill's wife replaces his typewriter with a computer. He doesn't want the computer, but it sparks an idea for a story about an old house that doesn't want to be modernized by its new owners.
4	"The Cure"	Neill Fearnley	Harry Dunn	November 11, 2000
Bill is paranoid that he is going to die young and he comes up with a story about a sick boy who catches his neighbors doing something sinister, but no one believes him.
5	"Call of the Wild"	Jeff Woolnough	Bradley Thompson & David Weddle	November 18, 2000
Cynthia's former boyfriend and his new wife invites The Fearings on a fishing trip, triggering a story in Bill's mind about three salesmen on a hunting trip being stalked by a menacing, unseen force.
6	"Two Faces"	James Head	Harry Dunn & Rachel Manija Brown	December 2, 2000
Bill considers a new agent and writes a story about a man who gets more than he bargained for when he dates a co-worker with a deadly secret.
7	"Gentleman Caller"	Joseph Patrick Finn	George Melrod	Unaired
Bill writes a story about a woman who rekindles her relationship with an old flame, when his mother-in-law starts dating again.
8	"Come to Papa"	Jeff Woolnough	Harry Dunn	Unaired
Bill works on a book about Hemingway's ghost.
9	"Will"	James Head	Harry Dunn, Billy Brown & Dan Angel (story); Harry Dunn (teleplay)	Unaired
Bill watches a dog and gets inspiration for a story about a deadly inheritance.
10	"Maximum Security"	Tom Westman	Bradley Thompson, David Weddle & Rachel Manija Brown (story)	Unaired
Bill writes a story about a robbery.
11	"The Fortunate One"	James Head	Ron Darian (story); Liz Friedman & Vanessa Place (teleplay)	Unaired
Cynthia gets interested in feng shui.
12	"Intruder"	Mark Sobel	Lisa Klink & Ethan Lawrence	Unaired
Lenore gets a new boyfriend, Cynthia finds a new job and Bill finishes his latest novel.
13	"On the Road"	Brenton Spencer	Billy Brown, Dan Angel, David Weddle & Bradley Thompson	Unaired
As Bill tries to teach Lenore all about his car and how to drive a stick shift, he finds inspiration for a new story in which a woman on a road trip starts receiving threatening calls on her cell phone.
