= Bat'leth =

Star Trek weapon

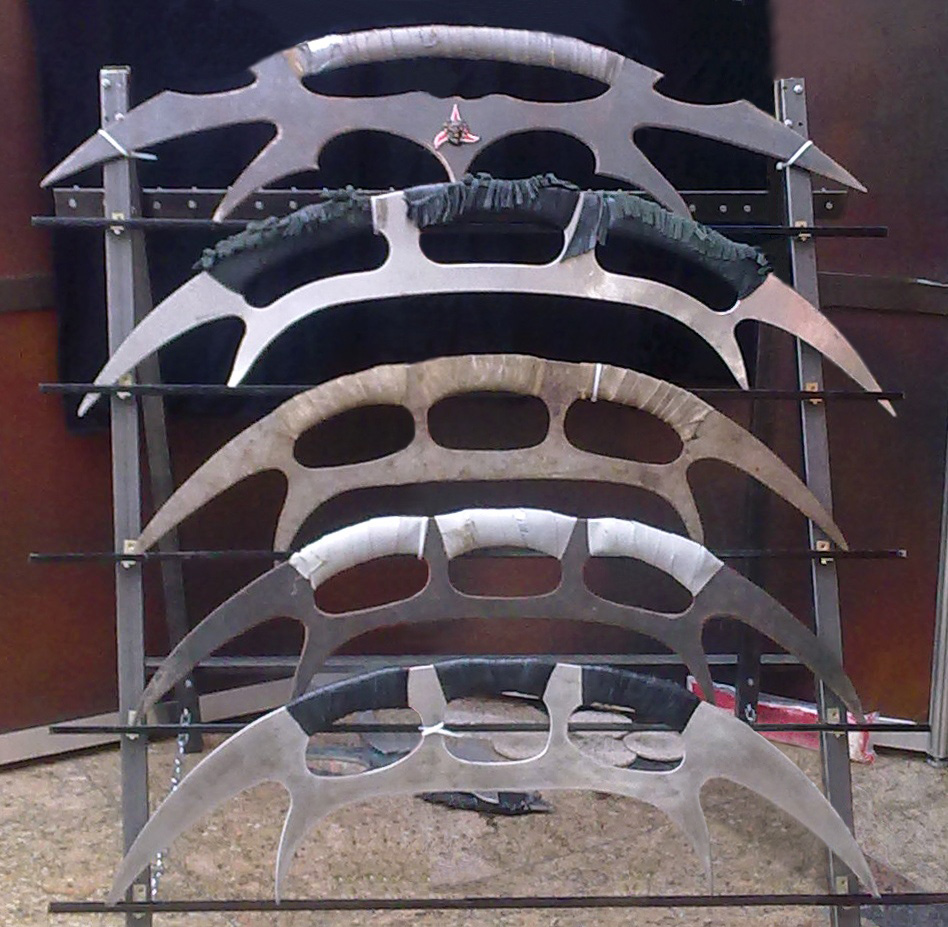
A collection of replica Bat'leths. Note the replica of "The Sword Of Kahless" at the top.

The bat'leth (Klingon: betleH, rough pronunciation: [ˈbɛtʰlɛx]; plural betleHmey, [ˈbɛtʰlɛxmɛj]) is a double-sided hybrid-edged weapon with a curved blade, four points, and three handholds on the back. It was designed and created by Star Trek: The Next Generation visual effects producer Dan Curry for the Star Trek franchise, where it is the characteristic close combat weapon of Klingons. Curry has called the bat'leth "one of the iconic images associated with the show." It has spawned a smaller weapon, which became known as the mek'leth; in Klingon, this is written meqleH. A third weapon, a kur'leth, was later designed by Dan Curry, for Season 3 of Star Trek: Picard. Bat'leths have become an enduring symbol of the franchise among fans, and they are occasionally referenced in other media.

== Description ==
A bat'leth is a curved blade approximately 5 feet (1.5 m) long, with two spiked protrusions at each end and three handholds along the back which can be used to twist and spin the blade rapidly.

Dan Curry created the bat'leth in 1990 for Worf, the character played by Michael Dorn in Star Trek: The Next Generation, after receiving approval from producer Rick Berman. Curry based the bat'leth's design on the Chinese fighting crescent. A martial artist aside from his regular work as a visual-effects producer, Curry also developed a fighting style, based on a variety of different martial arts he learned during his time in Asia, for the use of the weapon.

=== Mek'leth ===
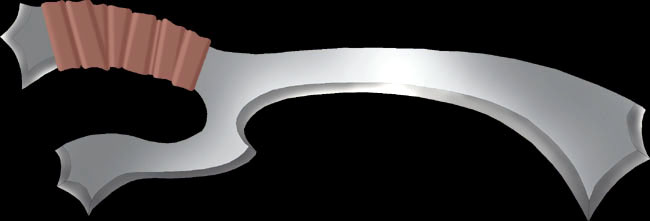
A Mek'leth, a smaller version of the Bat'leth

In 1995, Curry developed a smaller version of the bat'leth, the mek'leth, whose design he based on that of a Northern Tibetan cavalry sword, for Dorn to use when Dorn joined the cast, and Worf joined the crew, of Star Trek: Deep Space Nine. Mek'leths are intended for one-handed use and shaped like a scimitar; they are approximately half the length of the full-size bat'leth.

== Use in Star Trek ==
In Star Trek lore, the Klingon Kahless created the bat'leth around CE 625. According to Klingon mythology, he formed the blade by dropping a length of his hair into some lava from inside the Kri'stak Volcano, then cooling, shaping, and hardening it in the lake of Lursor. He then united Qo'noS, the Klingon homeworld, by killing a tyrant named Molor with the weapon, which became known as the Sword of Kahless. The sword was later stolen by a species called the Hur'q during their invasion of Qo'noS. In the Deep Space Nine episode "The Sword of Kahless", Worf and another Klingon named Kor rediscover the artifact, but it is eventually transported into space to prevent them from using it to attack each other. The Sword of Kahless differs from normal bat'leths as it has five points and one handhold compared to four points and three handholds.

In the Klingon language, the bat'leth was originally referred to as batlh'etlh, then was shortened to betleH. The word bat'leth itself means "sword of honor". Bat'leths are made of a reinforced metal called baakonite and are normally 116 centimeters (3.81 ft) long and weigh 5.3 kilograms (12 lb).

The bat'leth appeared in 29 television episodes across the Star Trek franchise in Star Trek: The Next Generation, Star Trek: Voyager, Star Trek: Deep Space Nine, and Star Trek: Enterprise, and later appears in several episodes of Star Trek: Discovery. The bat'leth was also used in the 1994 film Star Trek Generations. The mek'leth appeared in the television series Deep Space Nine and in the 1996 film Star Trek: First Contact. The Sword of Kahless appeared in the 2000 video game Star Trek: Armada and normal bat'leths appeared in the 1996 video game Star Trek: Klingon. Some of the bat'leth's uses were in the debut episode "Reunion", where Worf teaches his son Alexander how to use one. Worf used a bat'leth to kill Duras—a Klingon who killed Worf's mate K'Ehleyr. Notable uses of the weapon occurred in the Voyager episode "Barge of the Dead"—in which Tuvok uses a bat'leth to teach B'Elanna Torres about her Klingon heritage, and in the Deep Space Nine episode "Tacking into the Wind"— in which Worf kills the leader of the Klingon High Council, Gowron, in a bat'leth duel to give the Klingon Chancellorship to General Martok.

== Cultural legacy ==
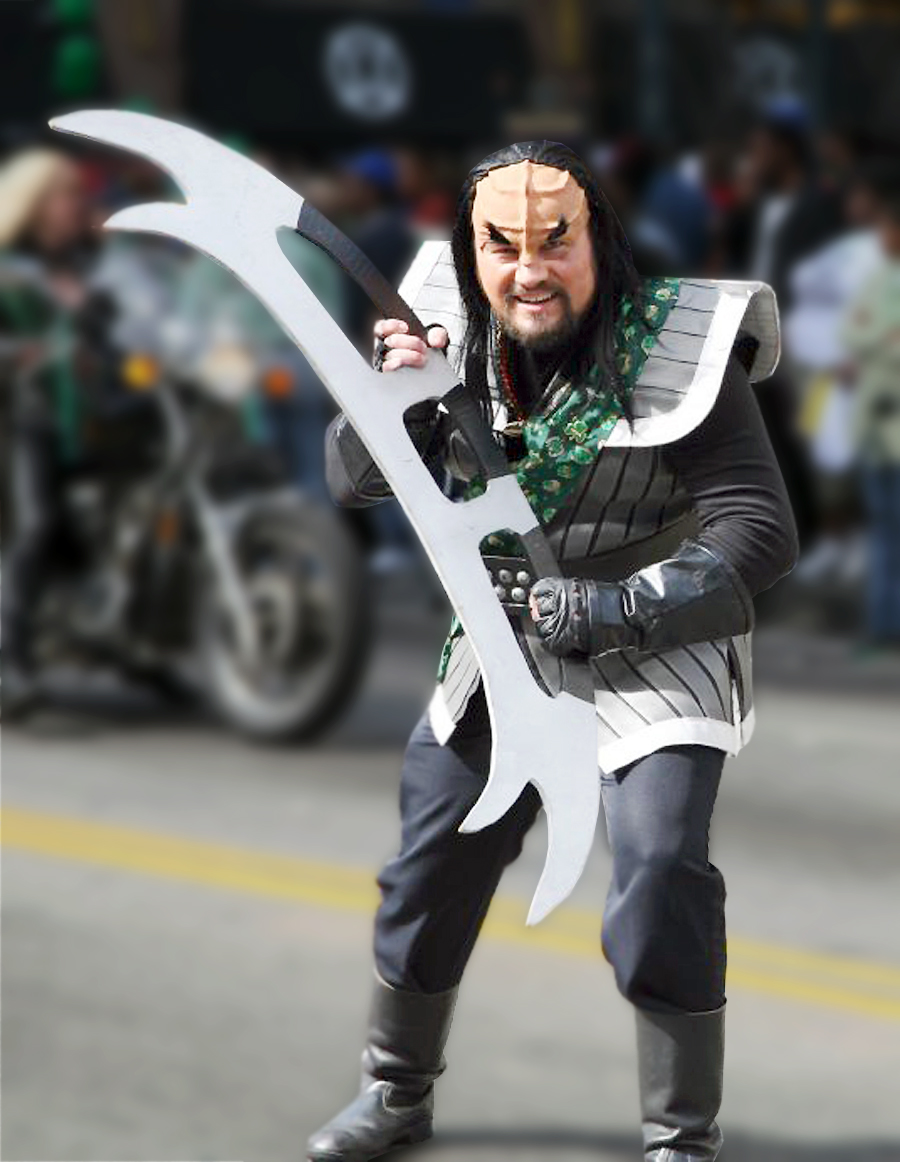
A cosplayer in a Klingon costume with a bat'leth

The bat'leth is considered an iconic image of the Star Trek universe. Replicas are widespread and are considered collectibles by some and a part of Klingon costume. A number of outlets, including replica merchants, weapons dealers, and pawn shops sell them. Ronald D. Moore, who has worked on Star Trek and Battlestar Galactica, displays one in his office. However, due to the dangers that real bat'leths can pose, no officially licensed replicas of the weapon are available from either Curry or Paramount Pictures.

The rise in the popularity of the bat'leth has led to the formation of martial arts teams aiming to develop a martial art distinct from the one Curry initially developed. Such teams have incorporated moves from ju-jitsu, kendo, kinjitsu, and nunchaku. Bat'leth competitions have been held at conventions such as MileHiCon and StarCon.

The bat'leth has appeared in television programs outside the Star Trek franchise. In 2002, it was seen in Stargate SG-1 episode "The Other Guys". In 2005, a bat'leth was in the background of the US detective series Monk episode "Mr. Monk vs. the Cobra". In 2010, one was seen in the "Chuck Versus the Beard" episode of the American action-comedy series Chuck. In 2011, a bat'leth was used in American situation comedy The Big Bang Theory episode "The Zarnecki Incursion". A bat'leth also receives screen time in the television film Swindle (2013).

== Legality ==
Replicas of the bat'leth are often made of metal and can be dangerous. Media reports documenting instances of replica bat'leths being used in crimes have referred to the weapon as a "double-pointed Klingon crescent-shaped sword", a "Klingon-type sword", a "Star Trek Klingon-type sword" or as a "double-pointed scimitar".

=== United Kingdom ===
In the United Kingdom, it is legal to possess a bat'leth on private property; however, they may be seized if they are considered to be "potential evidence of a criminal lifestyle." They are classed as weapons, which makes it illegal to carry one in a public place. In 2009, a man from Billingham, County Durham, was arrested for possession of what the court documents later described as a "multi-bladed sword" in a public street. His defense called the item a "Star Trek bat’leth sword" although it was not an official replica, and the judge said, "I've never seen anything like it in my life before." The accused pleaded guilty at Teesside Crown Court, and he was later sentenced to thirteen weeks in prison. The court ordered that the bat'leth be forfeited and destroyed. A custom-made bat'leth was seized in 2009 in Accrington, Lancashire.

=== United States ===
The legality of the bat'leth in the United States differs between states. In 2009, a small double bladed knife shaped like a bat'leth was used in Colorado Springs, Colorado, in two armed robberies. The Colorado Springs Police Department said that it was a deadly weapon. The Federal Bureau of Investigation discovered and seized a bat'leth-like weapon as part of a cache of weapons in connection with a $4 million Medicare fraud investigation in 2010.
