= Pulsed energy projectile =

Nonlethal weapons technology used by the US military for riot control

Pulsed energy projectile or PEP is a technology of non-lethal weaponry. The U.S. military is developing PEP using an invisible laser pulse which ablates the target's surface and creates a small amount of exploding plasma. This produces a pressure wave that stuns the target and electromagnetic radiation that affects nerve cells causing a painful sensation. The technology can be used as a lethal weapon.

The pulsed energy projectile is intended for riot control and is said to work over distances of up to 2 km. It weighs about 230 kg and can be mounted on vehicles.

The US system was developed by Mission Research Corporation (now owned by Orbital ATK). It uses a chemical deuterium fluoride laser device producing infrared laser pulses. The plasma (produced by the early part of the pulse) explodes because its electrons absorb the energy of the later part of the pulse.

In 2003, a US military review reported that the electromagnetic radiation produced by PEPs cause pain and temporary paralysis in animal experiments.

The United States Special Operations Command FY 2010 plans included starting development on a Counter UAV Pulsed Energy Projectile.

== Controversy ==
PEP became controversial when it appeared that a team under Brian Cooper was assigned to work on the pain factor. It was discovered that PEP could with some tweaking induce cold burn feelings and other forms of painful sensations. The controversy and the fear of public opinion to see it turned into a torture tool that wouldn't leave any physical evidence on the victim ended the official program. Cooper kept on studying effects of laser-generated plasma pulse on pain receptors and published a paper in 2008 titled "Frequency Dependent Interaction of Ultrashort E-Fields with Nociceptor Membranes and Proteins".

== See also ==
- List of laser articles

== Sources ==
- globalsecurity.org - Pulsed Energy Projectile (PEP)
- New Scientist - Maximum pain is aim of new US weapon, 2 March 2005
- Buncombe, Andrew (March 5, 2005). "Pentagon attacked for `Pulse' gun that inflicts long-distance pain". The Independent. Archived from the original on March 11, 2007 – via FindArticles.
- Military contract for PEP pain study, from thememoryhole.org
- John B. Alexander. Non-Lethal Weapons to Gain Relevancy in Future Conflicts. National Defense. March 2002
- Presentation on PIKL, by Harry Moore, 29 August 2000
