= Dennis Madalone =

American actor

Dennis "Danger" Madalone (born September 29, 1954) is an American stunt coordinator, actor and musician.

== Career ==
Madalone coordinated stunts for over 400 episodes of Star Trek: The Next Generation (TNG), Star Trek: Deep Space Nine (DS9) and Star Trek: Voyager (VOY). He also appeared in overall 64 episodes of the three series, mostly in uncredited minor roles as an officer or an alien warrior of the Klingon, Borg, Cardassian, Kazon or other races. Examples of credited roles in the series include Ramos, an Enterprise security officer killed by renegade Klingons in the 1988 TNG episode Heart of Glory and Atul, a Klingon spy in the 1995 DS9 episode Visionary. Further, he coordinated stunts for Castle.

In 2002, he released his song and music video, a tribute to the victims of the September 11, 2001, terrorist attacks, titled "America We Stand As One". Described as "the scariest music video", "saccharine" and "bizarre", the video has become an internet phenomenon.

== Personal life ==
Madalone grew up in South Plainfield, New Jersey and graduated from South Plainfield High School in 1974.
