= Deer horn knives =

Chinese bladed weapons

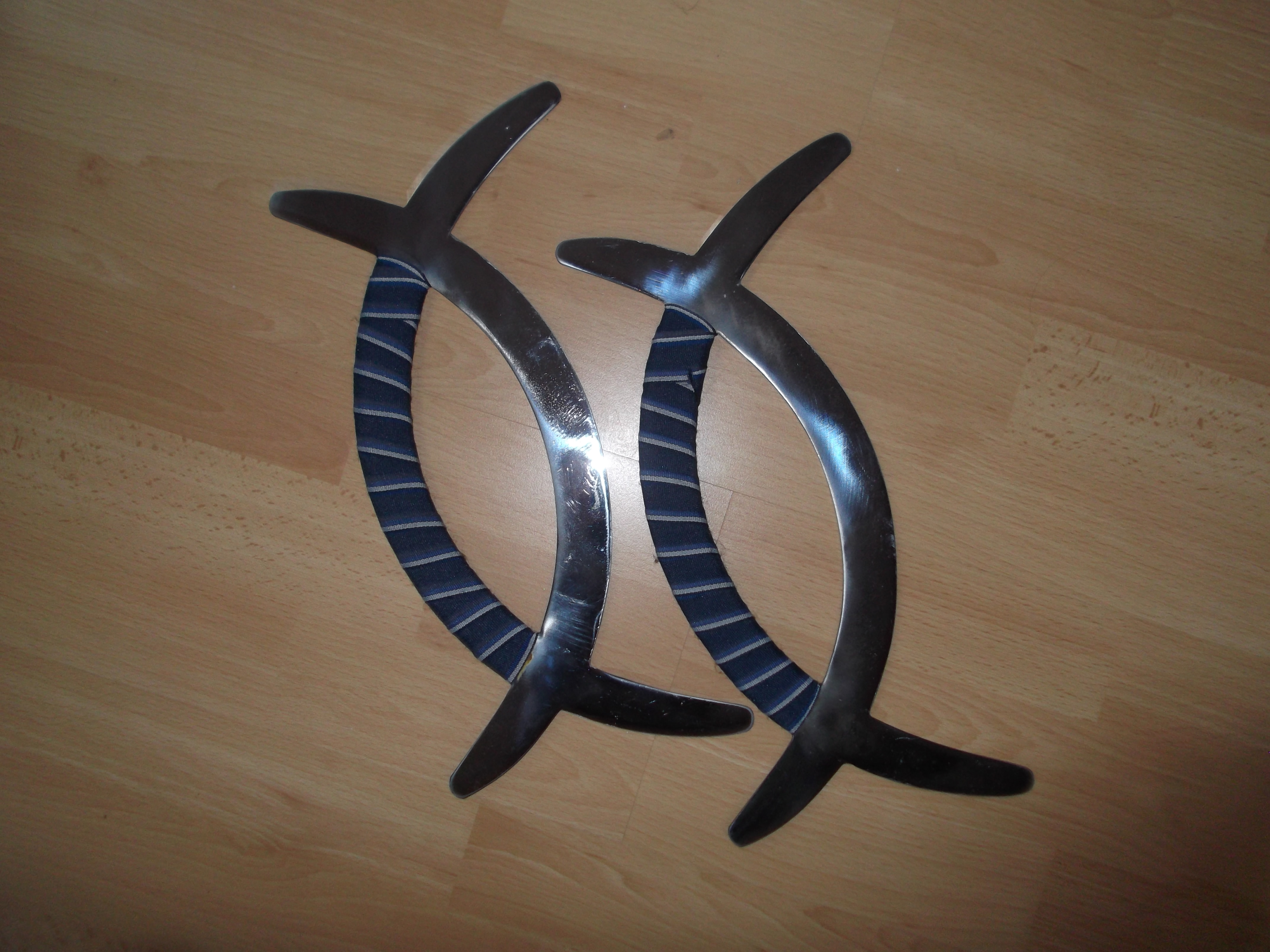
A set of deer horn knives.

Deer horn knives (Chinese: 鹿角刀; pinyin: Lùjiǎodāo), also known as crescent moon knives or duck blades (Chinese: 鴛鴦鉞; pinyin: Yuānyāngyuè), are specialised Chinese bladed weapons consisting of two steel crescents crossing. They are used in Chinese martial arts. This crossing produces four curved, clawlike points, one of which is extended as the "main" blade. The practitioner grips the wrapped middle of the lengthened crescent with the other acting as a hand guard. They are relatively short weapons that are easily concealable in traditional Chinese clothing, and are usually trained in pairs, one for each hand.

Deer horn knives are especially associated with the soft style Chinese martial art Baguazhang, which is known for its diverse weaponry. They are mainly used in trapping an opponent's weapon in aid of tying up or breaking the opponent's weapon, disarming the opponent and other close combat applications.

Deer horn knives are normally used against longer weapons such as spears, swords, broadswords, or any weapon which uses a safe distance to attack from. One advantage of deer horn knives in comparison to a longer weapon is that seeing as the deer horn knives are direct appendages of the hands, they can be moved with great speed and precision, and along with their ease of concealment, can easily be used to catch their opponent off guard.

== Variations ==
Some variations of deer horn knives include pairs with one crescent being longer than the other, the larger blade presumably being used as the "main" hand and the smaller blade as the "guard" hand.

== See also ==
- Tekkō
- Wind and fire wheels
