= Dan Curry =

American visual effects producer

Daniel Curry is a visual effects producer and supervisor, as well as a main title designer in the film and television industry.

Curry attended Middlebury College in Vermont and graduate school at California State Polytechnic University, Humboldt in California.

He is best known for his work on Star Trek: The Next Generation, Star Trek: Deep Space Nine, Star Trek: Voyager, and Star Trek: Enterprise. His work on these series earned him fifteen Emmy Award nominations and seven Emmy awards wins. As Visual Effects supervisor, Curry frequently served as a second unit director. He directed an episode himself on only one occasion, the Star Trek: The Next Generation episode "Birthright, Part II".

Starting on TNG, Curry used his experience as a martial artist to develop a fighting style for the fictional alien race known as the Klingons. He designed several Klingon hand-to-hand combat weapons, including the Sword of Kahless, the mek'leth, and—most notably—the bat'leth.

In addition to designing the title sequence for Star Trek Voyager, Curry has designed many memorable title sequences for feature films, including Top Gun, Big Trouble in Little China, and Three Amigos. He has also worked as visual effects supervisor on the television series Chuck.

As of 2015, Curry sits on the board of directors for the Hollywood Science Fiction Museum.
