= The Perfect Mate =

- Star Trek: The Next Generation episode
- The make up designed for Famke Janssen as Kamala (pictured left) was later used on Terry Farrell in Star Trek: Deep Space Nine
- Episode no.: Season 5 Episode 21
- Directed by: Cliff Bole
- Story by: René Echevarria; Gary Percante
- Teleplay by: Gary Percante; Michael Piller
- Production code: 221
- Original air date: April 27, 1992

Guest appearances
- Famke Janssen – Kamala; Tim O'Connor – Briam; Max Grodénchik – Par Lenor; Mickey Cottrell – Alrik; Michael Snyder – Qol; David Paul Needles – Miner #1; Roger Rignack – Miner #2; Charles Gunning – Miner #3; April Grace – Transporter Officer; Majel Barrett – Computer Voice

Episode chronology
← Previous "Cost of Living"	Next → "Imaginary Friend"
- Star Trek: The Next Generation season 5

"The Perfect Mate" is the 21st episode of the fifth season of the American science fiction television series Star Trek: The Next Generation, the 121st overall. The episode was credited to Gary Percante and Michael Piller from a story by Percante and René Echevarria. Percante was a pseudonym of Reuben Leder, which was used by the writer in protest against re-writes. Four endings were written, with two filmed. "The Perfect Mate" was directed by Cliff Bole.

Set in the 24th century, the series follows the adventures of the Starfleet crew of the Federation starship Enterprise-D. In this episode, Captain Jean-Luc Picard (Patrick Stewart) develops feelings for Kamala (Famke Janssen), a woman destined from childhood for an arranged marriage which hopefully might end a war between two planets. Picard steps in to help in the peace ceremony and later gives Kamala away at her wedding.

The episode was the second acting job for former model Janssen, and she would subsequently turn down the offer to join the main cast in Star Trek: Deep Space Nine. Her makeup seen in "The Perfect Mate" would end up being used on Jadzia Dax in that series. Also appearing was Max Grodénchik, who would go on to play Rom in Deep Space Nine. "The Perfect Mate" received Nielsen ratings of 10.8 percent, and received a mixed reception from reviewers. On the one hand some criticism was directed at the presentation of Kamala and the Ferengi, but praise for Stewart and Janssen's acting performance.

== Plot ==
Kriosian ambassador Briam (Tim O'Connor) comes on board the Enterprise with some cargo, ready for a peace ceremony with the Valtian. As the ship heads to the rendezvous, they save two Ferengi from a failing ship. Despite security being assigned, the Ferengi enter the cargo bay and deactivate the stasis field on Briam's cargo, revealing a young Kriosian woman named Kamala (Famke Janssen). With the Ferengi secured, it is revealed that she is an empathic metamorph who can sense what males around her desire and react accordingly. She was being brought for an arranged marriage to the Valtian representative. Kamala generates pheromones that can affect males around her, which was why she was kept in stasis until the ceremony.

Briam tells Kamala to stay in her quarters, but Captain Picard allows her to travel throughout the ship, with the unaffected Lt. Commander Data (Brent Spiner) as her escort. This results in a fight nearly breaking out in Ten Forward, when Kamala begins to interact with several miners. The Ferengi seek to bribe Briam to turn Kamala over to them, but he rejects their offer. As he leaves, they attack him, causing him to fall, hit his head, and lose consciousness. The Enterprise turns the Ferengi over to the nearest starbase to stand trial, but Briam is unable to participate in the ceremony. Kamala helps Picard to take on Briam's role, and the two become close. He seeks to resist her abilities and tells her to be herself, and she explains that the woman he wants her to be is who she actually is.

They meet with the Valtian ambassador, Chancellor Alrik (Mickey Cottrell), who is uninterested in the marriage and wants to pursue trade agreements. With the arrangements made, Picard visits Kamala to say goodbye; she tells him that she has permanently bonded with him instead of Alrik. Kamala explains that he has changed her for the better, and she will continue in her duty for her people to marry Alrik. At the wedding ceremony, Picard escorts Kamala down the aisle and watches as she marries Alrik. After the newlyweds have returned to the planet, Picard says goodbye to Briam in the transporter room. When asked how he resisted Kamala, Picard's face remains expressionless as he wishes the ambassador a safe trip home.

== Production ==
=== Writing ===
The story for "The Perfect Mate" was created by René Echevarria and Reuben Leder and then written as a teleplay by Leder and executive producer Michael Piller. A great deal of edits were made to the script by a number of staff members, and Piller felt that it was a difficult one due to the subject matter. As Piller explained to Echevarria in a memo, he felt that Kamala had to be a well-rounded character which would be loved by the viewer in order for the episode to work.

Fellow executive producer Rick Berman recalled heated discussions over the content of the script, and following re-writes to the draft, Leder elected to be credited only under the pseudonym Gary Percante. This was the only time during Piller's tenure as executive producer that a writer chose to be credited under a pseudonym. Piller subsequently praised the episode, saying: "We have Beverly argue the point that Kamala's mission amounts to prostitution, and we have Picard taking the other tack; that whether or not we approve, we can't change or interfere with the way these people are. And if you accept [Gene] Roddenberry's vision, which we are built on, you have to respect that."

Two of the scenes seen in "The Perfect Mate" built upon references in earlier episodes. The morning meeting over tea between Picard and Crusher seen here was previously mentioned in "Qpid", while in "Family" there was the mention of Picard taking piano lessons as a child. In "The Perfect Mate", he relates that these were only briefly taken because his mother wanted him to. Four endings were written for the episode, with two filmed. Piller preferred a "trick ending" in which Picard daydreamed of objecting to the wedding, but ultimately with Kamala rejecting both him and Alrik having been enlightened by Picard's influence.

=== Casting ===
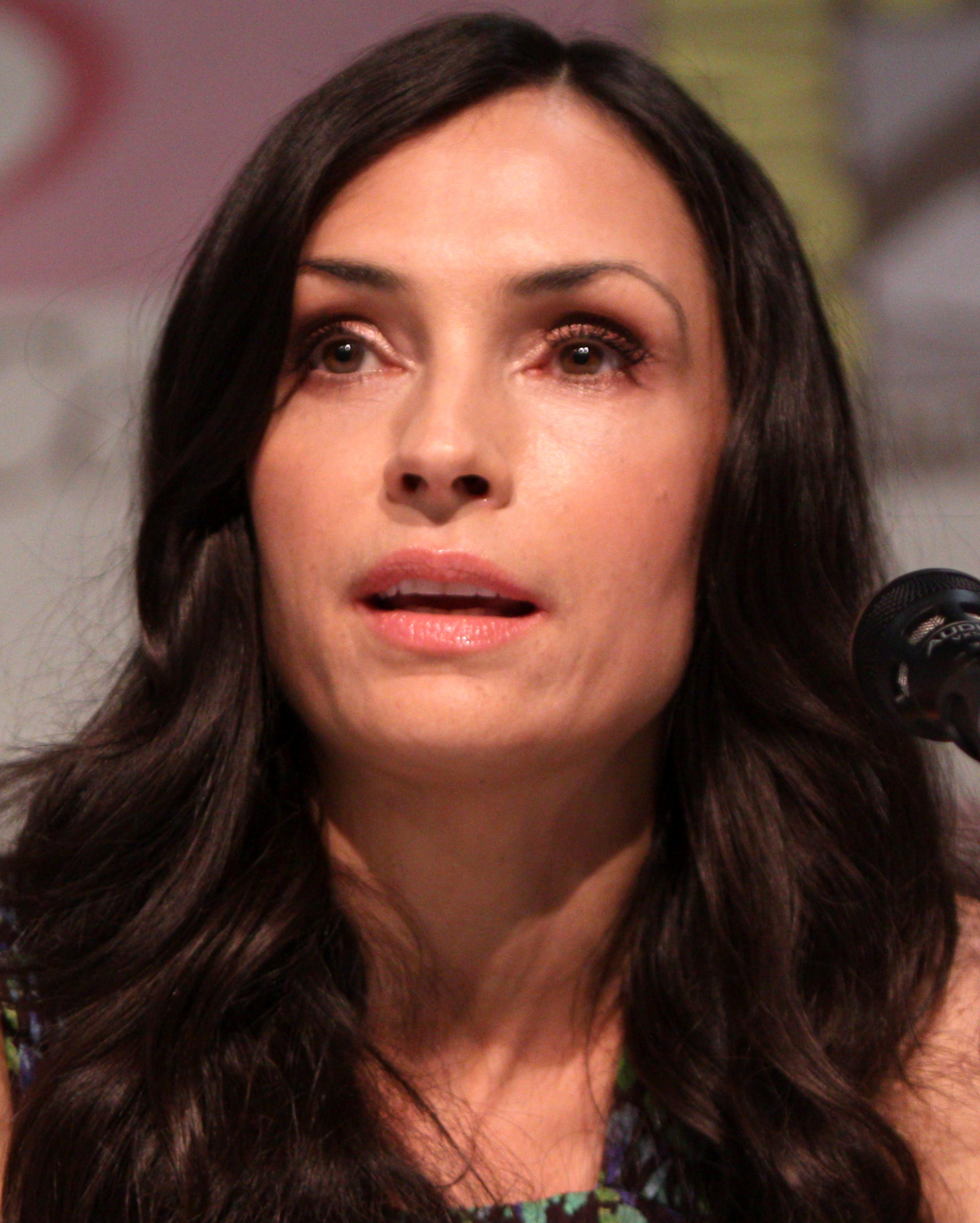
Famke Janssen had worked as a model before appearing in "The Perfect Mate".

Prior to working on The Next Generation, Famke Janssen had worked as a model in Europe for seven years. Her first acting role was on the television series Fathers and Sons, with Star Trek representing her second acting performance. Two days after auditioning for the role of Kamala, she was on set filming the episode. She later described how this did not give a great deal of time to prepare for the role, and that new script pages would be delivered on a daily basis through the seven day shoot which she found difficult due to her lack of fluency in English at the time. However, she said the cast were friendly and described them as a "family". Regarding the make-up, she said that on the first day they created a stencil through which they applied the spots on the following six days. Janssen said that Kamala was "very intelligent and educated". Berman described Janssen as "about as beautiful as any woman any of us have ever seen and she gave a delightful performance".

Following her appearance in the episode, Janssen was offered a five-year contract to appear in the main cast as Jadzia Dax on Star Trek: Deep Space Nine, but turned it down as she did not want to be tied to a long term series contract, and felt it would have made her lazy as an actor. The makeup worn by Janssen was used on the actor cast in that part, Terry Farrell, although without stencilling. This was as a result of Berman's rejection of the original Trill makeup from "The Host", with Kamala's makeup suggested as a replacement. At the time of an interview with Starlog in 1993, Janssen said that she would be happy to return to The Next Generation to portray Kamala once again. She did not return to the series, but went on to appear as Jean Grey alongside Stewart in the 2000 film X-Men and subsequent films in the series. She found working with Stewart easy when they were reunited, because of their previous work on "The Perfect Mate".

"The Perfect Mate" was one of several episodes of The Next Generation where Max Grodénchik portrayed a Ferengi. He would subsequently audition for the role of Quark on Deep Space Nine, but this went to Armin Shimerman. Grodénchik then portrayed "Ferengi Pit Boss" in the pilot of Deep Space Nine, "Emissary", who was subsequently written to become the brother of Quark, Rom. Michael Snyder went on to appear as another Ferengi in The Next Generation episode "Rascals".

== Themes ==
Robin Roberts discussed "The Perfect Mate" in her 1999 book Sexual Generations. She explained that the premise of a perfect mate had been seen elsewhere in science fiction, such as in The Stepford Wives, and said that she found it disturbing when works of the genre depicted this as a role model for women. She called "The Perfect Mate" the exemplification of the "depiction of woman as a passive reflection of a male partner". She compared the Federation non-interference in a people who treat women as gifts to the involvement of the United States in the Gulf War in defence of Kuwait, a country which limits rights for women.

In Chris Gregory's 2000 book Star Trek: Parallel Narratives, he compared "The Perfect Mate" to the Star Trek: The Original Series episode "Elaan of Troyius" and the ancient Greek poem the Iliad. He said that the influence of Picard caused Kamala to abandon any potential sense of happiness and replace it with an increased sense of self-awareness and remove the ability for her to legitimately love Alrik.

== Reception ==
"The Perfect Mate" aired during the week commencing May 10, 1992, in broadcast syndication. According to Nielsen Media Research, it was watched by 10.8 percent of all households watching television during its timeslot. This was the lowest first run episode of the season. It was the lowest rating since "In Theory", broadcast during the fourth season, and no episode broadcast afterwards during the course of the season received ratings equal or lower.

Starlog reported in 1993 that the reception from female fans of Star Trek was mostly negative due to the manner in which Kamala was presented, while some reviewers offered a similar opinion. Michelle Erica Green, in her review for TrekNation in 2013, praised the chemistry between Stewart and Janssen but called it "a terrible episode, an enormous setback in terms of how Next Gen presents women in the 24th century, and the fact that I appreciate several of the performances doesn't mean I don't wish it had never been produced." She questioned that if Kamala's gender was switched about whether the arguments presented in the episode would have remained, and felt it was a missed opportunity to tackle social issues. Keith DeCandido disliked the episode in his review for Tor.com in 2012, giving it a score of two out of ten. He opined that he would "expect a storyline rooted in tiresomely traditional gender roles from a show airing in the late 1960s. Not so much the early 1990s." He said that Janssen was "flat", and did not have any chemistry with Stewart. DeCandido also criticized the Ferengi "at their absolute worst" and the absence of Deanna Troi from the episode.

However, other reviewers received the episode more positively. Zack Handlen gave the episode a rating of a "B+" in his 2011 review for The A.V. Club. He called the Ferengi "as awful as ever", but otherwise praised the episode. He said that Janssen was one of the reasons why it worked, with the evolution of Kamala through "The Perfect Mate" showing "a sense of someone coming into their own as a sexually aware, potentially powerful individual." Handlen compared the situation to the "Elaan of Troyius", and found the imprinting of Kamala on Picard an unexpected twist. It was ranked in 47th place out of the top 100 of the entire franchise in Charlie Jane Anders' list for io9. In the Toronto Sun's list of the top fifty moments of the franchise, Janssen's appearance as Kamala was placed 13th.

In 2019, Screen Rant included this episode on a list of bad one-off romances on the show; in part they were confused by the pair later being cast as Professor X and Jean Grey in the X-Men franchise.

In 2021, writer Robert Vaux, for CBR, said that Famke Janssen was a "terrific" co-star for Patrick Stewart, and highlighted this episode among a trio of season five episodes (along with "Darmok" and "The Inner Light") that he really shone in.

== Home media release ==
"The Perfect Mate" was first released on VHS cassette in the United States and Canada on October 7, 1997. The episode was later released in the United States on November 5, 2002, as part of the Season 5 DVD box set. The first Blu-ray release was in the United States on November 19, 2013, followed by the United Kingdom on November 18.

== See also ==
- "Precious Cargo" (Star Trek: Enterprise) The first meeting between Kriosians and humans.
- "Polymorph" (Red Dwarf) The crew encounter a lifeform able to alter its form in response to emotional and situational cues.
- "Camille" (Red Dwarf) The crew encounter a Pleasure GELF, a lifeform able to alter how it is perceived based on the desires of others.
