= Equilibrium (Star Trek: Deep Space Nine) =

- Star Trek: Deep Space Nine episode
- Episode no.: Season 3 Episode 4
- Directed by: Cliff Bole
- Story by: Christopher Teague
- Teleplay by: René Echevarria
- Production code: 450
- Original air date: October 17, 1994

Guest appearances
- Lisa Banes as Dr. Renhol; Jeff Magnus McBride as Joran; Nicholas Cascone as Timor; Harvey Vernon as Yolad

Episode chronology
← Previous "The House of Quark"	Next → "Second Skin"
- Star Trek: Deep Space Nine season 3

"Equilibrium" is the 50th episode of the television series Star Trek: Deep Space Nine, the fourth episode of the third season.

Set in the 24th century, the series follows the adventures on Deep Space Nine, a space station located near a stable wormhole between the Alpha and Gamma quadrants of the Milky Way Galaxy, near the planet Bajor. This episode is centered on the Station Ops crew, with several guest stars. It focuses on the Trill character Jadzia Dax and the mysterious occurrences that begin to happen to her. It also further explores the Trill alien species, especially the nature of their "symbionts".

It achieved a Nielsen rating of 7.4, which is an estimated percentage of viewership out of the total number of U.S. households. It originally aired in broadcast syndication on October 17, 1994.

== Background ==
The Trill aliens were introduced on Star Trek: The Next Generation on May 11, 1991, with the episode "The Host". "The Host" was directed by Marvin V. Rush and written by Michel Horvat. They return as one of the prime characters of Deep Space Nine, with Jadzia Dax. Dax is a symbiotic lifeform that is implanted in a living host. The symbiont has the memories of all of its previous hosts, this provides an emotional bonding of personalities linking host and symbiont and can lead to interesting social situations. On Deep Space Nine, Jadzia Dax is a joined Trill (not all Trill have a symbiont - they are rare) and many episodes explore the situation; major Trill episodes prior to "Equilibrium" include "Dax" (S1E8), "Invasive Procedures" (S2E4), and "Blood Oath" (S2E18).

== Plot ==
At a dinner party, Jadzia Dax toys with a piano and finds herself playing an unfamiliar tune despite having no musical training in this life nor in her previous ones. Later, she experiences odd mood swings and hallucinations of a masked figure. Bashir finds that these symptoms are linked to her symbiont. According to Dax's medical history, a previous host experienced similar symptoms when he went into a six-month coma. Sisko and Bashir take Dax back to her homeworld, where Doctor Renhol of the Trill Symbiosis Commission stabilizes Dax's symptoms. However, Dax suffers a relapse and experiences a new hallucination of Trill hospital guards in century-old uniforms accosting her. Frustrated, Sisko, Bashir, and Dax visit the caves where unjoined symbionts are spawned to consult the caretakers. A caretaker there believes that Dax's problems stem from memories of one of her symbiont's previous hosts.

Sisko and Bashir identify the musical tune Dax heard in her hallucinations as a composition by a Trill named Joran Belar. When Dax sees his photograph, she experiences another hallucination of the masked man murdering someone, and when she rips off his mask she sees Joran's face. She then goes into neural shock and is hospitalized. Doctor Renhol plans to remove the Dax symbiont, which will kill the host Jadzia. Sisko and Bashir revisit the spawning caves, but the caretaker there has been scared into keeping quiet. Bashir finds that the Trill government deleted information on Joran Belar from its records. However, they manage to contact Joran's brother, Yolad, who says that Joran was a candidate for being joined with a symbiont. According to the official report, Joran was rejected due to his violent temper and murdered the doctor who evaluated him, and was then killed by hospital security. However, Yolad doubts this story, because he remembers Joran telling him that he had been successfully joined. Sisko and Bashir deduce that Joran was one of Dax's previous hosts, and to cover this up Joran's files were altered and Dax's memories of him were suppressed.

Sisko and Bashir confront Doctor Renhol, and accuse her of letting Jadzia die in order to protect an even bigger secret. The Trill government claims that only one in a thousand Trill are physically and psychologically fit to be joined with a symbiont. If a symbiont is placed in an unfit host, both host and symbiont will die within days. Joran's psychological problems should have disqualified him, but the doctors failed to detect them and gave him a symbiont. By the time the doctors discovered their mistake, Joran had been carrying the symbiont for six months despite being "unfit". This proves that the official criteria for fitness are excessively stringent. Renhol admits that nearly half of all Trill are in fact fit to carry symbionts, but if the truth came out the small supply of symbionts would be fought over fiercely, jeopardizing their welfare and destabilizing Trill society. To prevent this, the government pretends that only a tiny minority of the Trill population are fit to be joined so as to lower the demand for symbionts to a manageable level.

The only way to stabilize Dax's mind would be to allow her suppressed memories of Joran to resurface. Sisko threatens to expose the secret if Jadzia dies, so Renhol agrees to remove the memory blocks. Dax recovers and must come to terms with her disturbing new memories.

== Arc significance ==
- Joran is one of the personalities seen in "Facets" (broadcast June 12, 1995).

== Release ==
The episode was released on June 3, 2003, in North America as part of the season 3 DVD box set. This episode was released in 2017 on DVD with the complete series box set, which had 176 episodes on 48 discs.

On July 6, 1999, it was released on LaserDisc in the United States, paired with "House of Quark".

The episode was released with "The House of Quark" on a VHS cassette.
