= Rejoined =

- Star Trek: Deep Space Nine episode
- Lenara Kahn (left) and Dax kissing
- Episode no.: Season 4 Episode 5
- Directed by: Avery Brooks
- Story by: René Echevarria
- Teleplay by: René Echevarria; Ronald D. Moore
- Production code: 478
- Original air date: October 30, 1995

Guest appearances
- Susanna Thompson as Lenara Kahn; Tim Ryan as Bejal; James Noah as Pren; Kenneth Marshall as Michael Eddington

Episode chronology
← Previous "Indiscretion"	Next → "Starship Down"
- Star Trek: Deep Space Nine season 4

"Rejoined" is the 78th episode of the American science fiction television series Star Trek: Deep Space Nine, the fifth of the fourth season. It originally aired on October 30, 1995, in broadcast syndication. The episode received a record volume of feedback from viewers for the series, both positive and negative, as it marked one of the first televised lesbian kisses on American television.

Set in the 24th century, the series follows the adventures on Deep Space Nine, a space station located near a stable wormhole between the Alpha and Gamma quadrants of the Milky Way Galaxy. The plot of "Rejoined" expands on the Trill species, of which DS9 officer Jadzia Dax is a member. They are formed of a host and a symbiont, with the symbiont passed from host to host as the previous one dies. In the episode, Dax is reunited with Lenara Kahn, the widow of one of the symbiont's former hosts. The two struggle with their feelings for one another because of the taboo in their species against reuniting with loved ones of former hosts as they work together to experiment on wormholes.

The episode was the first that writers Ronald D. Moore and René Echevarria wrote together, and it was directed by main cast member Avery Brooks. In the first draft, Dax's former partner was written as male, but after this was changed, the story was cleared through studio executives. The Trill taboo was intended to be an allegory for homosexuality and homophobia. "Rejoined" received a Nielsen rating of seven percent on the first broadcast in syndication. Reviews have been mostly positive towards the episode because of its message, but there was criticism that the plot was not exciting enough and there was a negative reaction from some viewers.

== Plot ==
Captain Benjamin Sisko (Avery Brooks) notifies Lieutenant Commander Jadzia Dax (Terry Farrell) that a group of Trill scientists will be arriving soon at Deep Space Nine to perform experiments related to wormhole physics. The Trill are a species of humanoids, some of whom host a sluglike symbiont implanted into them. The symbionts live far longer than the hosts, and are moved into a new host when the old one dies. Jadzia is the eighth host of the Dax symbiont. Sisko tells Dax that the head scientist is Lenara Kahn (Susanna Thompson), and offers to grant Dax a leave of absence while the Trill scientists are aboard, but she turns it down. Upon Dax and Kahn's first meeting, Major Kira Nerys (Nana Visitor) notices that they are very familiar with each other; Dax tells her that Kahn used to be her wife. Dr. Julian Bashir (Alexander Siddig) later explains to Kira that previous hosts of the Dax and Kahn symbionts were married to each other, but Trill are forbidden from reassociating with partners and lovers of past hosts.

At the welcome party for the visiting scientists, Dax and Kahn warm to one another's company once more. Afterward, they begin to socialize as they work together on Kahn's wormhole experiment aboard USS Defiant. They agree to have dinner, but to also bring Bashir along as a chaperone. At dinner, Bashir is effectively ignored by the two Trills as they reminisce about their past hosts. Later, back on the Defiant, Kahn successfully creates an artificial wormhole and Dax hugs her in celebration. Kahn's brother Bejal (Tim Ryan), who is on the science team, speaks to her separately and highlights his concerns regarding her contact with Dax. Despite this, Kahn goes to Dax's quarters and a discussion between the two leads to a kiss; Kahn leaves before it goes any further.

Dax confides in Sisko that she knows she is in love with her former wife. He reminds her that Trill customs mean that if they resumed their relationship, then they would be exiled from their homeworld and their symbionts would never be joined with a new host, but says that she will have his support either way. Kahn and Dax continue to work on the experiment, but it goes wrong and Defiant is severely damaged. Kahn is injured in the explosion, but Dax rigs a force field across a plasma fire that allows her to reach Kahn, coming to the realization that the relationship is worth exile. After returning to the station, Kahn recuperates from her injuries. She decides against resuming her relationship with Dax, and—with the experiments complete—departs with the science team, leaving Dax heartbroken.

== Production ==
=== Writing and directing ===
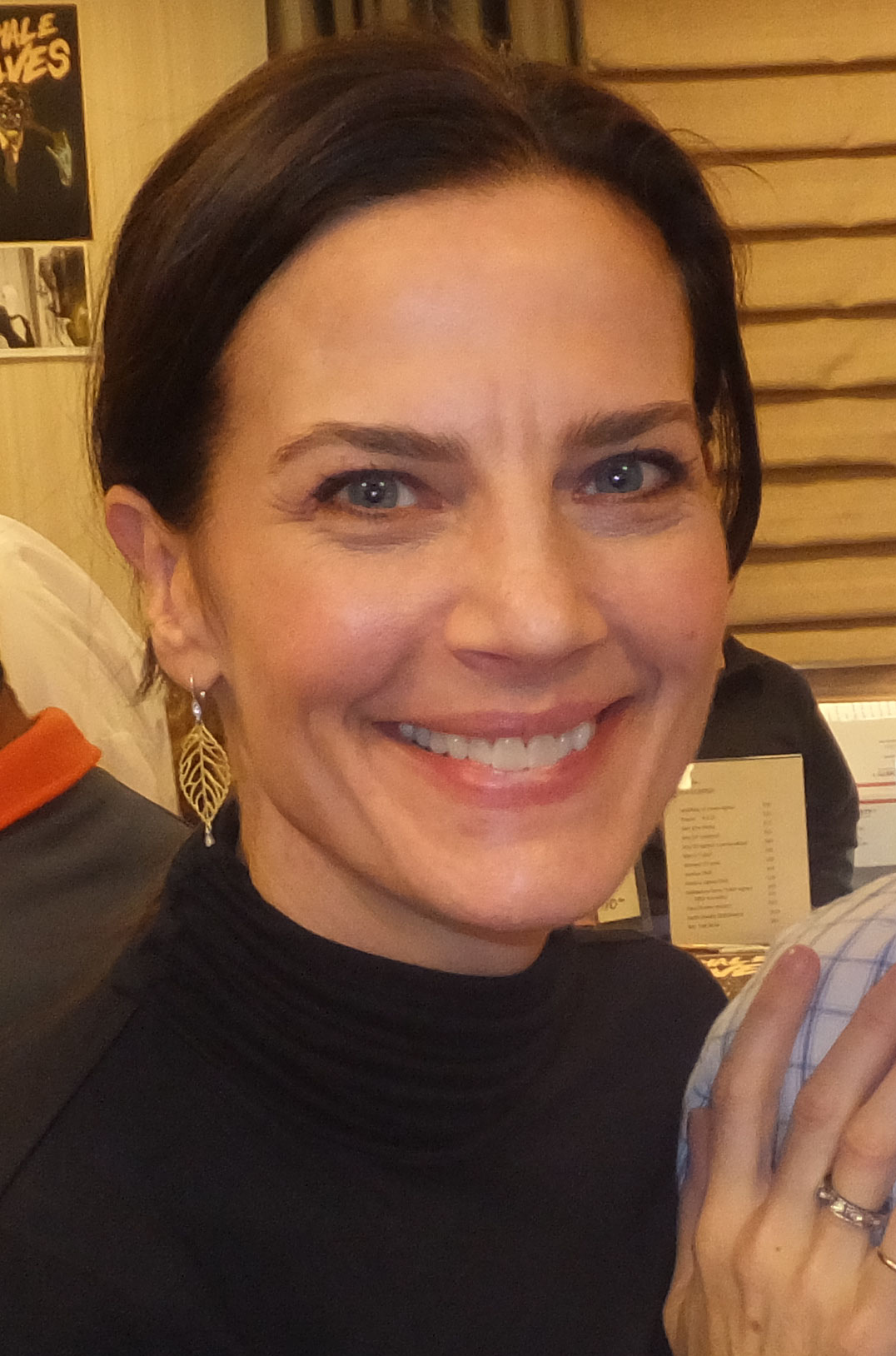
Terry Farrell was happy to support the LGBT community through the story line in "Rejoined".

"Rejoined" marked the first time that longtime Star Trek writers Ronald D. Moore and René Echevarria wrote a script together. They had been hired by executive producer Michael Piller following separate unsolicited manuscripts submitted during the third season of Star Trek: The Next Generation, and had remained on the staff of the franchise since. In Echevarria's first draft of the story, there was no lesbian element as Dax's former lover was male. The Trill taboo against reuniting relationships from past hosts was suggested by Piller early on in the creation of Deep Space Nine, in order for the society to prevent an "aristocracy of the joined", where joined hosts never met anyone that they did not already know.

It was Moore's suggestion to make Dax's former partner a woman in order to tackle the taboo against homosexuality by way of the on-screen taboo against re-association. At that stage, they intended to make no reference in the script to any characters having a concern about Dax's relationship with a woman so as to focus the story. Clearance was sought for the plot, first from showrunner Ira Steven Behr, then executive producer Rick Berman, and finally from the studio executives. Moore later explained that they agreed to the idea, saying that Star Trek stood for making statements like those in "Rejoined".

Terry Farrell was happy with the story line, saying that it made sense for Dax to have this issue because the symbiont had been in both male and female hosts, adding that "Gender wasn't the issue. For the worm/symbiont, it was a matter of the being it was embodied in." She was pleased to be able to "stand up" for the LGBT community. A similar story had been approached during the first appearance of the Trill in The Next Generation episode "The Host". In this story, however, when the symbiont is transferred from a male to a female host, the Trill is rejected by the character who was the Trill's female partner, Beverly Crusher. The subplot featuring Kahn's artificial wormhole was described as a "MacGuffin" by Moore, and simply a way to get the character into "Rejoined". This was not the first subplot to be considered for the episode, with the main plot from "Bar Association" originally thought of as being suitable to appear in either "Rejoined" or "Crossfire". Instead, the plot, which involved Rom forming a trade union, was expanded into the main plot of its own episode.

The episode was directed by Avery Brooks, who played Benjamin Sisko in the series, who later said that "Rejoined" was his favorite of the episodes he directed. He said that the episode was about love, and the choices that result from that, and that it was an extraordinary story about losing someone you love and having that person restored to you some time afterward. Following the death of Jadzia in the sixth season finale, "Tears of the Prophets", Farrell suggested that the symbiont could be moved to a male character resulting in a similar situation as "Rejoined" between the new Dax host and Worf, as the two were in a relationship at that point. Instead, the symbiont was placed in a new female host called Ezri, as the producers did not want Kira Nerys to be the only female main character. The prejudice against re-association first highlighted in "Rejoined" was mentioned in seventh season episodes such as "Afterimage".

=== Visual effects and guest stars ===
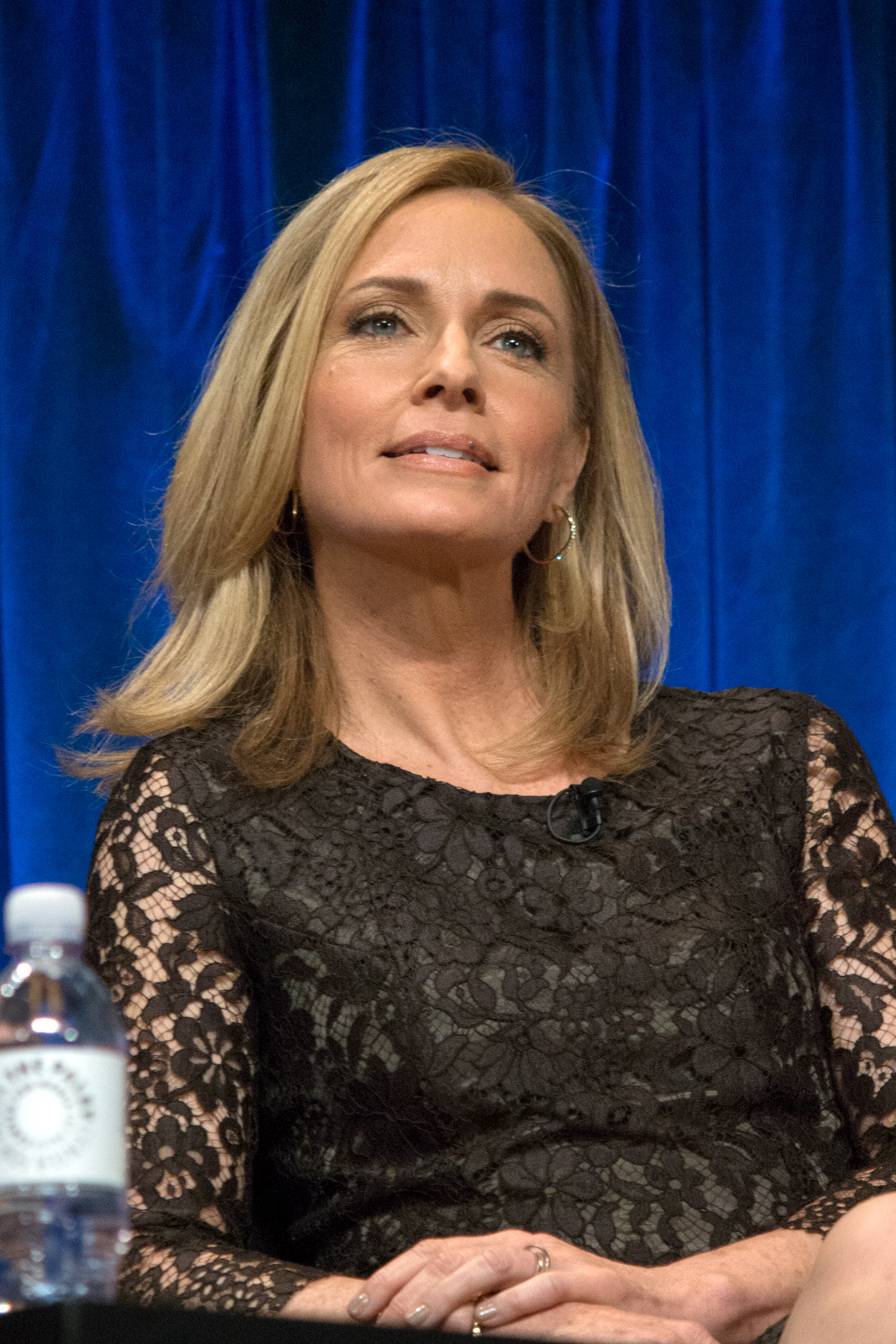
"Rejoined" was one of several appearances in the Star Trek franchise for Susanna Thompson.

Visual effect supervisors Gary Hutzel and Glenn Neufeld were busy completing post-production work on the opening episode of the fourth season, "The Way of the Warrior". In their place, visual effects coordinator David Takemura led on the visual effects work on both "Rejoined" and "The Visitor". For this episode, his two main tasks were the creation of the artificial wormhole and the sequence where Dax uses a forcefield as a walkway to reach a trapped Kahn. Takemura was relieved that the wormhole was intended to be artificial in nature, as it meant that he did not have to attempt to re-create the detail already seen in the Bajoran wormhole on the series. Once he came up with the basic design, visual effects company VisionArt completed it.

For the forcefield scene, Farrell was shot "skating" down a board painted blue against a blue screen. A mixture of liquid nitrogen and hot water was used to create a fog around the ground. VisionArt combined these shots with the force field and footage of the engineering set on board the Defiant, while a staff animator added a "plasma glow" around her feet as she made contact with the field.

Before appearing in "Rejoined", Susanna Thompson had previously appeared in two The Next Generation episodes; "The Next Phase" and "Frame of Mind". She later appeared in Star Trek: Voyager as the Borg Queen, previously portrayed by Alice Krige in the film Star Trek: First Contact. Farrell praised Thompson's part in "Rejoined", calling her a "wonderful actress and a joy to work with".

== Themes ==
Writers on Deep Space Nine had previously hinted at a potential same-sex relationship in the first season episode "Dax", when Jadzia Dax says goodbye to Enina Tandro, a former lover of Dax's previous male host, Curzon. The first take of the scene resulted in a situation in which it was unclear whether Dax and Enina were about to kiss. It was decided at the time that it was not appropriate, although the writers had hoped that there would be a time when the viewers would accept such a relationship. This theme was eventually realized in "Rejoined". Allen Kwan has argued that Deep Space Nine is the only series of Star Trek that resists the heteronormativity typical of the franchise at the time, citing both "Rejoined" and the Mirror Universe episodes as examples, even if the presented bisexuality is problematized.

During that 1995/96 television season there had been an increase in the number of homosexual characters appearing in major television series, and so the same-sex kiss in "Rejoined" was reviewed in this context. An article published by the Associated Press suggested that the kiss in Deep Space Nine was not truly a same-sex kiss due to "extenuating circumstances"; namely, one of the characters was an "alien who used to be a man". A similar opinion was offered by Jan Johnson-Smith, author of American Science Fiction TV, who said that the situation was "ambiguous" as, despite presenting a same-sex kiss, the episode was clear that Jadzia was "actually kissing the symbiont who has the memories of the former host, her male lover, not the current female host".

For film studies scholar Jean Bruce, the ambiguity of the kiss is foreshadowed in an early scene revolving around a magic trick. On the one hand, the magic trick produces a "pleasurable surprise", while, on the other, this mirrors the deception necessary, due to Trill norms, in the reacquaintance of the characters. At the same time, the juxtaposition of very different shots serves to "convey physical distance and the desire to bridge it", which mirrors the fact that the Trills' love for one another transcends gender, identity and death. Though the kiss is "informed by the fact that Dax was a man in her past life", once it occurs, it can "never be taken back", and remains the queer image of two women kissing.

Nonetheless, "Rejoined" was still considered controversial because of its subject matter, which depicts two women who engage in a same-sex romantic relationship, and included one of the first televised lesbian kisses. During the course of the episode, no characters register concern about Dax being involved with a woman, only that she was an ex-spouse. David Greven, literary critic and author of Gender and Sexuality in Star Trek, said that "Rejoined" was one of the better-received episodes of Star Trek that dealt with homosexuality as a theme, but that the franchise overall had typically avoided LGBT issues. Bryan Fuller, who also wrote for Deep Space Nine, said that the franchise had usually avoided those story lines because of the paranoia of the studio regarding homosexuality. Dale Palmer, in an essay on gender and sexual politics, suggested that the choice was made to have a female same-sex kiss on screen because a male one would have alienated the main viewer demographic for the series: heterosexual men.

== Reception and legacy ==
=== Broadcast ===
"Rejoined" was first broadcast on October 30, 1995, in broadcast syndication. It received Nielsen ratings of 7 percent, placing it in eighth place in its timeslot. This was lower than the share received by "Indiscretion", broadcast in the week prior with a 7.2 percent share and "Little Green Men" in the week afterward with 7.7 percent.

=== Fan, cast, and crew response ===
When the episode was originally broadcast, there was a strong negative reaction from some viewers. As Deep Space Nine was shown in syndication, one channel in the Southern United States took the step of editing out the kiss from the initial broadcast. The mother of script writer René Echevarria told him that they should have issued a parental guidance warning before broadcasting it. More responses were received at the production office from viewers than for any other episode of the series, resulting in several staff members having to take turns on the phones in order to cover the load. The staff found that although the majority of the phone calls were negative about "Rejoined", the letters were mostly positive. Terry Farrell said in a 2015 interview that "Rejoined" was her favorite episode of all time and that she still had people thanking her for the episode, because "it gave them strength, and that it made them feel like they weren't alone, it inspired them to be themselves—all the things I was hoping it would do."

=== Critical response ===
Zack Handlen reviewed the episode for The A.V. Club in 2013, praising the natural manner in which the romance was progressed, saying that this was "refreshing" to see. He felt that the relationship did not appear to be manipulative for the sake of male viewers, but added that the ending was expected and that the episode never communicated to the audience the need to care about the duo. Handlen wrote that the overall story itself was "shallow", as the episode suffered from an "enervating lack of fun" which was only saved from "complete tedium" through "strong acting and an admirable lack of stigma". Keith DeCandido, in 2014 review on Tor.com, compared "Rejoined" structurally to The Next Generation episode "Lessons", which also had a "love-interest-in-danger climax". He praised the episode, saying that at the time of broadcast it was considered "radical" and said that both Farrell and Thompson managed to get across the romantic message. He called it a "Trek message" episode, but said that it was one of the better ones as it "shines a light on an inadequacy in our own culture via an alien culture, but in this case it muddies the waters a bit because the taboo actually makes sense on the face of it". He gave "Rejoined" a rating of eight out of ten. Reviewer Jordan Hoffman commented that Farrell's acting "really steps up to the plate" for this episode, and rated the episode five out of five. Writing for Playboy.com, Hoffman ranked the episode 256th out of 695 episodes in the Star Trek franchise.

In 2018, SyFy included this episode on their binge-watching guide for episodes featuring Jadzia Dax.

=== alien kisses ===
Dara Gellman, an independent Canadian video artist, used the kiss sequence in "Rejoined" as the basis of her 3-minute 1999 project alien kisses. In this piece, the kiss scene is manipulated—the video is slowed, the image enlarged and digitized—and trance music is added. New media scholar Carolyn Guertin argues that this serves to make the footage "even more alien", presenting queerness as "unearthly". Jean Bruce argues that, despite the inherent ambiguity of the scene in the episode, "the image is still one of two women kissing, which opens up the possibilities of queer desire on its own terms". Similarly, Guertin argues that Gellman translates the (not truly queer) scene into an "expression of gay love that is alien and apart, but no less erotic for being so". In using the scene in isolation, alien kisses, Bruce argues, "strips away the gender equivocation by imposing a new queer vision". She suggests that alien kisses works as an "antidote" to the "ultimately tame treatment" Star Trek has offered of queer themes, and as a "suggestion" that Star Trek acknowledge the desires of queer viewers and fans "beyond the occasional titillating episode".

== Home media release ==
The first home media release of "Rejoined" was on a VHS cassette alongside "Indiscretion" on March 25, 1996, in the United Kingdom. The first release within the United States was on a single-episode VHS release on August 1, 2000. It was released on DVD as part of the season four box set on August 5, 2003.

On August 5, 1998, "Rejoined" was released on LaserDisc format in Japan, as part of the 4th Season vol.1 box set.

== See also ==
- Kirk and Uhura's kiss, another notable Star Trek kiss
- Star Trek: Discovery, a later series in the franchise which included openly homosexual characters in the main cast
- Lesbian kiss episode, of which this episode, along with the later episode The Emperor's New Cloak, is an example
