= Little Green Men (Star Trek: Deep Space Nine) =

- Star Trek: Deep Space Nine episode
- Episode no.: Season 4 Episode 7
- Directed by: James L. Conway
- Story by: Toni Marberry; Jack Trevino
- Teleplay by: Ira Steven Behr; Robert Hewitt Wolfe
- Cinematography by: Jonathan West
- Production code: 480
- Original air date: November 6, 1995

Guest appearances
- Max Grodénchik as Rom; Aron Eisenberg as Nog; Megan Gallagher as Nurse Garland; Charles Napier as Denning; Conor O'Farrell as Carlson; James G. MacDonald as Wainwright

Episode chronology
← Previous "Rejoined"	Next → "Starship Down"
- Star Trek: Deep Space Nine season 4

"Little Green Men" is the 80th episode of the American syndicated science fiction television series Star Trek: Deep Space Nine, the seventh episode of the fourth season.

Set in the 24th century, the series follows the adventures of the crew of the Starfleet-run space station Deep Space Nine; several episodes of the series focus on the Ferengi, an alien race distinguished by their devotion to the pursuit of profit. In this episode, when the Ferengi bartender Quark and his brother Rom are bringing Rom's son Nog to Earth to enroll in Starfleet Academy, they are accidentally sent back in time to 1947 and become the supposed alien invaders in the Roswell UFO incident.

"Little Green Men" achieved a Nielsen rating of 7.7, ranking fifth when it was first televised.

== Plot ==
Quark receives a shuttle that his cousin Gaila has been promising him for years. For its maiden voyage, he takes his brother Rom and nephew Nog to Earth as Nog has been accepted to Starfleet Academy. After they depart Deep Space Nine, Rom discovers that Quark intends to make the trip financially profitable by smuggling an illicit load of volatile kemocite.

As the ship nears Earth, Rom finds that they are unable to drop out of warp, possibly due to sabotage by Gaila. However, venting the warp exhaust through the kemocite cargo enables the ship to drop out of warp. Unfortunately, in doing so the ship and crew are thrown back in time to July 1947 and crash land near Roswell, New Mexico. The Ferengi awaken on a U.S. military base, where the Americans believe them to be Martians. After Rom repairs their malfunctioning universal translators, Quark begins negotiations with the humans, whom he considers backward and gullible, to sell advanced technology from the future. He brags to Rom and Nog in private that "within a year we'll be running this planet," and dreams of cultivating a vast Ferengi economic empire with himself as the Grand Nagus. Nog tries to warn his uncle not to interfere with the course of history.

Unknown to the Ferengi, Constable Odo stowed away aboard the shuttle with them to investigate the kemocite smuggling, and thus was also thrown back in time. Using his shapeshifting abilities, Odo is able to move about the base locating and repairing their spacecraft. Having disguised himself as a guard dog to gain entry to the room where the Ferengi are being held, he tells Quark that they must try to preserve the timeline and not alter Earth's history. Quark, Rom, and Nog are interrogated by an army officer convinced that they have hostile intentions, but escape from custody with the help of a nurse and her fiancé, a professor who was brought to the base to try to establish dialogue with the aliens.

By harnessing the energy of an atomic bomb test scheduled for that morning in Nevada, Rom is able to use the remaining kemocite to return them to their proper time. After dropping off Nog at Starfleet Academy, Quark has to sell the damaged spacecraft for salvage and he, Odo, and Rom return to Deep Space Nine. As the episode ends, Odo arrests Quark for smuggling contraband.

== Production ==
Director James L. Conway compared the episode to a low-budget film he had made called Hangar 18, about the government cover-up of a UFO incident. Conway noted that Deep Space Nine did not often do comedy, and there was a tone meeting, where showrunner Ira Behr asked "Are you sure you can get the humor here?" Conway was confident that the episode would work out fine.

The producers requested a "Megan Gallagher type" for one of the roles in the episode. Upon hearing about this, Gallagher's agent contacted them and said that Gallagher might be able to do it herself. Following this she was offered the part in the episode. She had previously appeared in the second season episode "Invasive Procedures", and would later appear in the Star Trek: Voyager episode "Body and Soul".

Quark's spacecraft (named in this episode as Quark's Treasure) looks like the Ferengi pod, which was introduced in "The Price" on Star Trek: The Next Generation broadcast on November 13, 1989. The interior set was seen previously in "Prophet Motive" (S3E16), also a Ferengi-centric episode. Ferengi pod shuttlecraft designs appears in a number of customized versions throughout the rest of the series and it makes an appearance on Star Trek: Voyager also.

Charles Napier, who portrayed General Denning, previously appeared in the Star Trek: The Original Series episode "The Way to Eden". He had requested to play a military character after having portrayed a "space hippie" in his last appearance.

== Reception ==
In 2012, Den of Geek ranked this the fifth best episode of Star Trek: Deep Space Nine.

"Little Green Men" was rated as having the second top moment of all Star Trek by Geek.com in 2015.

In 2014, io9 ranked "Little Green Men" as the 85th best episode of Star Trek in their list of the top 100 Star Trek episodes.

SyFy ranked "Little Green Men" as the tenth best time travel plot in Star Trek in 2016.

In 2016, Empire ranked this the 35th best out of the top 50 episodes of the 700 plus Star Trek television episodes.

In 2016, The Hollywood Reporter ranked this episode the 18th best of Star Trek: Deep Space Nine.

In 2019, CBR rated "Little Green Men" the eleventh funniest Star Trek episode.

In 2019, Nerdist ranked this episode the seventh best time-travel episode of the Star Trek franchise.

In 2020, io9 listed this as one of the "must-watch" episodes of the series.

U.K. science fiction magazine and website SciFiNow ranked this one of the top ten episodes of Star Trek: Deep Space Nine, remarking that, although episodes about the Ferengi are "divisive", this one "is a joy.".
