= Jadzia Dax =

Fictional character in the TV series Star Trek: Deep Space Nine

- Star Trek character
- Terry Farrell as Jadzia Dax in "Emissary"
- First appearance: "Emissary" (1993)
- Last appearance: "Tears of the Prophets" (1998)
- Portrayed by: Terry Farrell

In-universe information
- Species: Trill
- Occupation: Chief Science Officer; Deep Space Nine and Commanding Officer USS Defiant (season 6)
- Affiliation: United Federation of Planets; Starfleet
- Posting: Deep Space Nine; USS Defiant
- Rank: Lieutenant Commander (seasons 4–6); Lieutenant (seasons 1–3)
- Partner: Lenara Kahn; Worf (spouse)

Jadzia Dax (/dʒædˈziːə ˈdæks/), played by Terry Farrell, is a fictional character from the science-fiction television series Star Trek: Deep Space Nine.

Jadzia Dax is a joined Trill. Though she appears to be a young woman, Jadzia lives in symbiosis with a long-lived creature, known as a symbiont, named Dax; Jadzia is Dax's eighth host. The two share a single, conscious mind, and her personality is a blending of the characteristics of both the host and the symbiont. As such, Jadzia has access to all the skills and memories of the symbiont's seven previous hosts. Prior to the symbiotic joining, Jadzia earned academic degrees in exobiology, zoology, astrophysics, and exoarchaeology.

Jadzia Dax is the chief science officer of the space station Deep Space Nine and is close friends with station commander Benjamin Sisko. Later in the series, she becomes involved with the Klingon character Worf, and they marry during the sixth season of the show. In the sixth-season finale Jadzia dies but the Dax symbiote survives, and in the seventh-season premiere returns with a new host Ezri Dax, played by Nicole de Boer.

== Development ==
=== Make-up ===
When selecting the characters for Deep Space Nine, the production staff knew that they would have humans, Bajorans, and a changeling; for other characters, they wanted to pick "a species that had already been established" on Star Trek: The Next Generation. They decided on a Trill, as seen in the form of Odan in the TNG episode "The Host".

Although Michael Westmore's alterations to make the Odan headpiece more feminine were as good as all of his work, the writers simply did not like it. Apparently, after she had put on the Odan forehead appliance, Rick Berman looked at Terry Farrell and said to Westmore, "What did you do to her head, she used to be beautiful?". Instead of changing species, as they had already come to like the idea of an "old man", a person with centuries of experience to guide Sisko, Westmore suggested, "just give her spots like we gave Famke [Janssen]", who played a Kriosian in TNG: "The Perfect Mate".

This make-up was used on all Trill afterwards, comprising lines of dark spots that run from the temples and down both sides of the head, neck, and body.

=== Characterization ===
When the show began, the writers had difficulty defining the character of Dax. Michael Piller explained, "Having a Trill seemed like a really, really good idea at the time, but it was the most difficult character for us to define. Jadzia Dax escaped us. At first we thought she was going to be ethereal, a Grace Kelly/Audrey Hepburn kind of goddess, and ultimately I think Ira Behr really figured it out, probably not until the second season, when he really made her a smart-talking, wise-cracking tough cookie."

In 2014, Farrell admitted she found playing the character initially frustrating. "The writers didn't know what to do with the character they created", saying she was asked to portray the character as a cross between Grace Kelly and Yoda. She was also annoyed by a scene written where Dax gossiped about who was dating whom on the station, questioning "Why would a 350-year-old person care about who you're going out with?"

Piller explained, "The more we've written her, the more we're finding that she is not what she appears to be. That underneath this placid exterior, there's all these various personalities that she's gone through that are in turmoil and there's a lot of inner conflict. You know all the voices we hear inside ourselves are all made up of different subpersonalities; well she's got them all screaming at her in a variety of different ways."

Ira Behr spoke further on the character, announcing that they had intentionally changed the character early in the series. He said, "We changed Dax in year two. Originally, she was going to be the Spock character, the wise old owl, the wise old man. And then we realized that she could be the one who's ready to go out and kick anyone's butt, and go out and have an adventure and have fun, and be kind of witty and mercurial. And that turned out to be great. When we found that part of the character, we just ran with it."

Speaking in 2002, Terry Farrell said of playing Dax, "It was a character who had lived seven lifetimes, been a man and a woman. Before I walked in and actually met everybody, I felt a little bit intimidated about this, I thought 'Oh my God, I need to meet them so they're going to tell me what I need to know.' And when I actually got here and spoke to everyone, they kind of didn't really know. And I was 28, and they kind of wanted me to be wiser than my years, just have the physicality of a 28-year-old, but have a 350-year-old wise person inside me."

"They tried to find what they wanted in adjusting me here and there, and I think really what happened was surrender to that it was all new for this Dax, Jadzia Dax, this experience of the seven lifetimes, and Michael Piller made the decision that she was trying to come to terms with all of these entities, all of these memories that were inside of herself. And I think that helped me a lot as an actress to try to assimilate the job, period, and in a lot of ways, made me feel a little lost and uncomfortable as Terry, which got played out as Jadzia, so it was okay that she slowly felt more comfortable, so did I, and by the time they decided to make me a little bit more roguish in the second or third season, I felt much more comfortable about the dialogue and the other actors, and my lack of stage experience. And when I had to start doing action sequences and work with Michael Dorn, I felt a lot more comfortable. I had my own voice."

When asked how she would like Jadzia Dax to be remembered, Terry Farrell said, "wisely mischievous."

=== Rejected ideas ===
Following the confirmation of Farrell's departure and plans to kill the character off, Michael Piller wanted to add a few lines to Star Trek: Insurrection (which was still in development) acknowledging Jadzia's death and the impact it had on Worf. Rick Berman eventually overruled this, arguing that this would confuse film audience members who did not follow the show regularly.

Early in the run of Star Trek: Deep Space Nine, Michael McGreevey pitched a story to the writers that featured Jadzia and Bashir falling in love. McGreevey commented, "It was a love story, a simple concept. I don't know why they didn't want to do it. The symbiont inside Dax becomes ill, making her ill, and Dr. Bashir must separate them in order to treat the symbiont. We would come to see the personality of Jadzia, which of course is different from Dax. Bashir falls in love with her, and she feels for him, too, but the most important thing in life is to be joined with the symbiont. Bashir realizes that the only way to save the symbiont is to put it back into Jadzia, and thereby lose the girl he loves".

== Joined nature ==
Jadzia Dax is a joined Trill. "Jadzia" is the name of the young Trill woman, while "Dax" refers to a slug-like symbiont that resides in her abdomen; Jadzia's actual family name was never revealed on the show. In the novels, her original name is said to be Jadzia Idaris. While Jadzia is 28 years old at the beginning of the series, the creature Dax is roughly 300 years old, having previously been hosted by seven other Trills. As a result, Dax may be considered the oldest crewmate on Deep Space Nine.

Prior to Jadzia, the Dax symbiont had been hosted by Lela, Tobin, Emony, Audrid, Torias, Joran, and Curzon.

The burden of seven lifetimes' worth of memories is not always a positive one; several episodes of Deep Space Nine focus on Dax's struggle with her dual nature:

- In the first-season episode "Dax", the previous host Curzon Dax is accused of murder. This leads to an extradition hearing to determine whether Jadzia can be held responsible for crimes committed during another lifetime. While the moral question remains unanswered, the legal issue is resolved when evidence arises of Curzon's innocence.
- In the second-season episode "Invasive Procedures", an unjoined Trill named Verad attempts to steal the Dax symbiont. Verad is upset that his application for a joining has been rejected by the Trill Symbiosis Commission, and he plans to steal the Dax symbiont and escape into the Gamma quadrant. He manages to remove the Dax symbiont from Jadzia and partially join with it before his escape is thwarted.
- Later that season, Dax mentors a Trill initiate in the episode "Playing God". Dax is responsible for training the young Trill, and for evaluating his suitability for joining. During the episode, Jadzia and Sisko discuss her own training under Curzon Dax, as well as the role that joining plays in Trill society.
- In the third-season episode "Equilibrium", Dax begins to experience unsettling mental problems. She travels back to Trill to discover the source of the problems. While undergoing treatment, she visits a network of caverns in which unjoined Trill attendants care for symbionts that have not been implanted into hosts. She eventually learns that the Dax symbiont had been previously joined with Joran Belar, a psychologically unstable host candidate who later committed a murder. Her memories of Joran's life and crime were suppressed, but her mental problems subside once she regains and confronts them.
- Later that season in the episode "Facets", Jadzia encounters each of Dax's previous hosts in the Trill "rite of closure", including the insane Joran. This episode reveals much of the backstory for the Dax character, and explores the relationship between Jadzia Dax, Curzon Dax, and Benjamin Sisko.
- In the fourth-season episode "Rejoined", Jadzia Dax encounters Lenara Kahn, the current host of the symbiont Kahn, who had been previously joined to Nilani Kahn, the wife of Torias Dax. Because Torias died suddenly, Dax's relationship with Kahn through its previous host was never resolved, and the two current hosts struggle in the episode with their feelings towards one another. This is complicated by a taboo in Trill culture against romantic relationships with partners of previous hosts.

== Portrayal ==
At the beginning of the series, Jadzia has just recently been joined with the symbiont Dax after the natural death of the previous host, Curzon Dax. Curzon had been a friend and mentor to station Commander Benjamin Sisko, and as Jadzia Dax, they continue this friendship despite the change in circumstances. Throughout the series, Sisko refers to Jadzia Dax by the affectionate nickname "Old Man," and she in turn frequently addresses him by his first name rather than his rank or "sir." She begins the series at the rank of lieutenant; at the start of the fourth season, she becomes a lieutenant commander and remains one until her death in the sixth-season finale.

During the early seasons, Jadzia Dax is pursued romantically by Dr. Julian Bashir. Dax consistently but politely rebuffs him, though she later admits that she somewhat enjoyed the attention (cf. "Starship Down"). After Jadzia's death, Dax's new host Ezri begins dating Bashir.

During the first season of the show, Jadzia Dax is often portrayed as somewhat reserved and aloof. In the early second-season episode "The Siege", she is ill-at-ease in the spider-filled caverns of a Bajoran moon, and is later disoriented by Kira's reckless piloting of a Bajoran starfighter. The writers' portrayal of the character begins to change in the second season, as they emphasize Jadzia Dax's gusto for life and extensive knowledge of other cultures:

- The second-season episode "Rules of Acquisition" begins with a scene in which Jadzia Dax plays tongo with a group of Ferengi. She seems surprisingly at home in this setting, calmly ignoring their sexist overtures and showing considerable skill at the game. Later in the episode, she remarks that the Ferengi are among the most interesting races she has encountered.
- Later that season, Jadzia Dax joins a group of Klingons in a revenge quest ("Blood Oath"). In this episode, Curzon Dax is revealed to have been a Federation diplomat to the Klingon Empire, and to have sworn a blood oath against "the Albino" with the Klingons Kang, Koloth, and Kor. Jadzia takes up the blood oath, and against Sisko's wishes, she travels to the Albino's planet and participates in the revenge killing of the Albino and his minions.
- Jadzia Dax's connection to the Klingon culture became increasingly important as the series progressed, especially after the fourth-season arrival of Worf. In the episode "The Sword of Kahless", Dax joins Worf and Kor in the search for the titular Klingon artifact. In "Sons of Mogh", she becomes aware of and subsequently warns Captain Sisko of Worf's attempt to kill his brother Kurn, and in "Soldiers of the Empire", she and Worf go on a tense mission aboard a Klingon ship. Jadzia Dax eventually marries Worf and joins him as a member of the Klingon House of Martok.

== Sexuality ==
Writers on Deep Space Nine had previously hinted at a potential same-sex relationship in the first-season episode "Dax", when Jadzia Dax says goodbye to Enina Tandro, a former lover of Dax's previous male host, Curzon. In the first take of the scene, it was unclear if Dax and Enina were about to kiss. It was decided at the time to be inappropriate, although the writers had hoped that a time would come when the viewers would accept such a relationship. This theme was eventually realized in "Rejoined".

The episode "Rejoined", in which Jadzia is reunited with the wife of a former host of the Dax symbiont, features one of the first televised kisses between two female characters. Terry Farrell was happy with the story line, saying that it made sense for Dax to have this issue because the symbiont had been in both male and female hosts, adding, "Gender wasn't the issue. For the worm/symbiont, it was a matter of the being it was embodied in." She was pleased to be able to "stand up" for the LGBT community.

In August 2019, Terry Farrell said that she regarded Jadzia as pansexual.

== Romantic interests ==
Jadzia Dax was initially pursued by Dr. Julian Bashir aboard the station. The Ferengi bar owner, Quark, also has a special affection for the Trill scientist, even after the Dax symbiont was transferred to Ezri. However, her most notable and serious suitors include:

- Deral, played by Brett Cullen, a resident of the planet Meridian ("Meridian")
- Dr. Lenara Kahn, played by Susanna Thompson, a Trill theoretical quantum physicist and the current host of the symbiont Kahn, who was previously joined to Nilani, the widow of Torias Dax ("Rejoined").
- Lt. Commander Worf, a Klingon: Dax and Worf connected over their mutual love of Klingon traditions, including Klingon opera and martial arts. Their intimate relationship began in "Looking for par'Mach in All the Wrong Places", and in "You Are Cordially Invited...", they were married and Jadzia Dax formally joined the House of Martok. Their attempts at parenthood (despite the difficulties faced by biological incompatibilities between Klingons and Trills) were cut short when Jadzia Dax was murdered.
- Captain Boday, an unseen former lover of Jadzia's, is occasionally referenced. Boday is a Gallamite, and like all Gallamites, has a transparent skull. Worf becomes angry with Jadzia when he learns she had lunch with Boday.

=== Relationship with Worf ===
In the fourth season, Michael Dorn joined the cast of Deep Space Nine as the Klingon character Worf. Perhaps because of her past interactions with Klingons, Dax is fairly flirtatious with Worf. He appears at first to be oblivious to this attention, and in the fifth-season episode "Looking for par'Mach in All the Wrong Places", he becomes enamored with a female Klingon named Grilka. This is resolved by the end of the episode, with Quark ironically winning the heart of Grilka, and Worf becoming romantically involved with Dax.

In the beginning, their relationship is very sexual, with the strong implication that their encounters are somewhat rough (the above episode ends with Worf and Dax visiting the infirmary with various bruises and other injuries). In the season-five finale "Call to Arms", the station is overrun by Dominion forces, and Dax and Worf are assigned to different starships for the Dominion War. Near the end of the episode, they agree to get married after the war is over. Worf and Dax's marriage is the centerpiece of season-six episode "You Are Cordially Invited...". During the episode, Dax must obtain permission from the lady Sirella to join the House of Martok. At first, Dax is loath to pay Sirella the required respect, and the lady is unwilling to accede to Dax's request. The situation is resolved by the conclusion, with Sirella admitting during the ceremony that nothing can stand between "the beating of two Klingon hearts".

== Death ==
Jadzia is murdered in "Tears of the Prophets", the finale of the sixth season. Worf and she had decided to attempt to conceive, despite the doubts of Dr. Bashir that such a pregnancy was possible. After Major Kira tells Jadzia she has been praying for a conception, Jadzia receives encouraging test results from Julian, saying that the enzyme modification would allow her to become pregnant with Worf's child. While the Federation leads an attack on Cardassia with the Defiant, Jadzia remains on the station for some unclear reason. Jadzia goes to the station's Bajoran temple to thank the Prophets for the good news of her potential pregnancy. The Cardassian Dukat transports to the temple, possessed by a Pah-wraith, when Jadzia is there and unleashes his power, mortally wounding Jadzia. Dukat opens an Orb, one of the artifacts given by the Prophets to the Bajoran people; the Pah-wraith enters it, the wormhole closes, blocking access to the Prophets. Jadzia dies shortly after in the infirmary. Sisko, devastated by her death along with the severed link to the Prophets, leaves the station in despair and in search of answers.

Though the host Jadzia is dead, the symbiont Dax survives and is removed and sent to Trill to be implanted into a new host. During the journey, Dax is quickly implanted into a Trill named Ezri Tigan. The resulting joined Trill, Ezri Dax, becomes a main character during the seventh and last season of the series. Worf grieves a long time for Jadzia, believing that because she did not die in battle, they will not meet again in Sto-vo-kor. He leads a dangerous mission against The Dominion in her name, to win her entry to the Klingon afterlife.

== Reception ==
Jadzia Dax, and all Trills in general, have been argued to be conceptualized in a similar way to transgender individuals.

In 2016, Screen Rant rated Jadzia Dax as the 19th-best character in Star Trek overall. In 2018, TheWrap placed Jadzia Dax as 26th of 39 in a ranking of main cast characters of the Star Trek franchise prior to Star Trek: Discovery.

In 2017, CBR ranked Jadzia Dax the 13th-fiercest female character of the Star Trek universe and in 2018, CBR ranked Jadzia the 18th-best Starfleet character of Star Trek.

In 2019, Jadzia was ranked the 12th-sexiest Star Trek character by Syfy. Writing for Syfy in 2020, Laura Dale called Jadzia “an early sci-fi trans allegory handled with respect”.
