= Lesbian kiss episode =

Using two women kissing on television to boost a show's ratings

The "lesbian kiss episode" is a subgenre of the media portrayal of lesbians in American television media, created in the 1990s. Beginning in February 1991 with a kiss on the American L.A. Law series' episode "He's a Crowd" between C.J. Lamb and Abby Perkins, (Note: 21 Jump Street included a kiss between series regular Holly Robinson Peete and guest star Katy Boyer in "A Change of Heart" (1990) but it did not inspire the critical or popular attention later such kisses would engender (Capsuto 2000, p. 235).) David E. Kelley, who wrote the episode in question, went on to use the trope in at least two of his other shows. Subsequent television series included an episode in which a seemingly heterosexual female character engages in a kiss with a possibly lesbian or bisexual character. In most instances, the potential of a relationship between the women does not survive past the episode and the lesbian or suspected lesbian never appears again.

In 2005, Virginia Heffernan, writing for The New York Times, examined the lesbian kiss episode phenomenon. She concluded that women kissing women is often used as a gimmick during "sweeps" periods, times when Nielsen ratings are used by the broadcast networks to determine advertising rates. Lesbian kisses are:

Eminently visual; cheap, provided the actors are willing; controversial, year in and year out; and elegantly reversible (sweeps lesbians typically vanish or go straight when the week's over), kisses between women are perfect sweeps stunts. They offer something for everyone, from advocacy groups looking for role models to indignation-seeking conservatives, from goggle-eyed male viewers to progressive female ones, from tyrants who demand psychological complexity to plot buffs.

Michele Greene, who played Abby on L.A. Law, confirmed in an interview with AfterEllen that her kiss with Amanda Donohoe's C.J. was a ratings ploy and that there was never any intention on the part of producers to seriously explore the possibility of a relationship between two women. The attitude about portraying lesbian relationships with any longevity persisted in Hollywood, as Buffy the Vampire Slayer (1997–2003) writer Marti Noxon encountered resistance from television executives when setting the groundwork for the long-term relationship between Willow Rosenberg (Alyson Hannigan) and Tara Maclay (Amber Benson). Noxon spoke of the resistance Buffy writers encountered in 2002, saying in an interview, "You can show girls kissing once, but you can't show them kissing twice… because the second time, it means that they liked it."

== Examples ==
Program	Title	U.S. air date	Kissers
L. A. Law	"He's a Crowd"	February 7, 1991	Abby Perkins (Michele Greene) and C. J. Lamb (Amanda Donohoe).
Picket Fences	"Sugar & Spice"	April 29, 1993	Kimberly Brock (Holly Marie Combs) and Lisa Fenn (Alexondra Lee). After negotiations between producer David E. Kelley and CBS, the scene was reshot in lower light.
Roseanne	"Don't Ask, Don't Tell"	March 1, 1994	Roseanne Conner (Roseanne Barr) and Sharon (Mariel Hemingway). Full contact not shown. Sharon makes a cameo appearance in "December Bride", featuring the wedding of two men.
Lifestories: Families in Crisis	"More Than Friends: The Coming Out of Heidi Leiter"	March 7, 1994	Heidi Leiter (Sabrina Lloyd) and Missy (Kate Anthony). Based on the true story of Heidi Leiter, who attended her senior prom in Virginia with her girlfriend. Neither character appeared again in this anthology series.
Star Trek: Deep Space Nine	"Rejoined"	October 30, 1995	Jadzia Dax (Terry Farrell) and Lenara Kahn (Susanna Thompson). Lenara Kahn never reappears on the series. As joined Trills, a previous male host of Dax and female host of Kahn had been husband and wife 90 years earlier. Trill culture considers such rejoinings to be taboo; however, no remarks are made about Jadzia's and Lenara's genders.
Star Trek: Deep Space Nine	"The Emperor's New Cloak"	February 1, 1999	Ezri Dax (Nicole de Boer) and Kira Nerys (Nana Visitor). In the alternate universe, mirror Ezri and mirror Kira share a kiss.
Relativity	"The Day the Earth Moved"	January 11, 1997	Rhonda (Lisa Edelstein) and Suzanne (Kristin Dattilo). Dattilo's character only appeared in episode. The series was cancelled four episodes later.
Sex and the City	"Bay of Married Pigs"	June 21, 1998	Miranda Hobbes and Syd (Joanna Adler). Miranda kisses Syd to prove that she, Miranda, is not a lesbian, and Syd never re-appears.
Sex and the City	"Boy, Girl, Boy, Girl..."	June 25, 2000	Carrie Bradshaw and Dawn (Alanis Morissette). Dawn never reappears on the series.
Ally McBeal	"Happy Trails"	November 9, 1998	Ally McBeal and Elaine Vassal
Ally McBeal	"You Never Can Tell"	November 23, 1998	Ally McBeal (Calista Flockhart) and Georgia Thomas (Courtney Thorne-Smith).
Ally McBeal	"Buried Pleasures"	November 1, 1999	Ally McBeal and Ling Woo (Lucy Liu). These episodes are unusual in that all of the women involved are series regulars.
Party of Five	"I'll Show You Mine"	May 5, 1999	Julia Salinger (Neve Campbell) and Perry Marks (Olivia d'Abo). Perry appears in one additional episode.
Talk to Me	"About Being Gay"	April 11, 2000	Janey (Kyra Sedgwick) and Teresa (Paulina Porizkova). On a dare from her friends, Janey flirts with Teresa, who turns out to be an actual lesbian. Janey decides she is not a lesbian after the kiss. Teresa was a one-episode character.
Friends	"The One with Rachel's Big Kiss"	April 26, 2001	Rachel Green (Jennifer Aniston) and Melissa Warburton (Winona Ryder); Rachel Green and Phoebe Buffay (Lisa Kudrow). Melissa never reappears on the series. Phoebe kisses Rachel to see what all the fuss Melissa made was about.
Waterloo Road	"Nowhere To Run"	May 2, 2013	Nikki Boston (Heather Peace) and Lorraine Donnegan (Daniela Denby-Ashe)
Industry	"Short to the Point of Pain"	September 5, 2022	Yasmin Kara-Hanai (Marisa Abela) and Celeste Pacquet (Katrine De Candole)
The Bold Type	"If You Can't Do It with Feeling"	July 25, 2017	Kat Edison (Aisha Dee) and Adena El-Amin (Nikohl Boosheri)
Starting From … Now!	Season 3, Episode 4	Dec 2, 2014	Steph and Darcy
Hightown	"Fool Me Twice"	December 26, 2021	Trooper Leslie Babcock (Tonya Glanz) and Jackie Quinones (Monica Raymund)
Famous in Love	Season 1, Episode 10	June 13, 2017	Alexis Glenn (Niki Koss) and Rachael Davis (Katelyn Tarver)
Once and Again	"The Gay-Straight Alliance"	March 11, 2002	Jessie Sammler (Evan Rachel Wood) and Katie Singer (Mischa Barton). Katie appears in three additional episodes of the series, and the two remain in a relationship, albeit secretly, until the cancellation of the series.
Firefly	"War Stories"	December 6, 2002	Inara Serra (Morena Baccarin) and the Councilor (Katherine Kendall). The Councilor is a client of Inara's and she does not reappear in the series, though it only had one season. Other characters note that they were previously aware that Inara accepted male and female clients.
Fastlane	"Strap On"	January 17, 2003	Billie Chambers (Tiffani Thiessen) and Sara Matthews (Jaime Pressly). Sara never reappears on the series.
All My Children		April 23, 2003	Bianca Montgomery and Lena Kundera. First lesbian kiss in American daytime television.
The Joe Schmo Show	Episode 7	October 7, 2003	Ashleigh (Melissa Yvonne Lewis) and Molly (Angela Dodson). In this reality television parody, Ashleigh and Molly kiss at the behest of a "network executive" who explains that the kiss is a ploy for ratings.
One Tree Hill	"I Will Dare"	October 19, 2004	Peyton Sawyer (Hilarie Burton) and Brooke Davis (Sophia Bush). Peyton and Brooke are both regular characters.
One Tree Hill	"The Heart Brings You Back"	January 25, 2005	Anna Taggaro (Daniella Alonso) & Peyton Sawyer (Hilarie Burton)
One Tree Hill	"Pictures of You"	February 7, 2007	Rachel Gatina (Danneel Harris) & Bevin Mirskey (Bevin Prince)
The O.C.	"The SnO.C."	December 9, 2004	Mandy (Monika Jolly) & Alex Kelly (Olivia Wilde)
The O.C.	"The Lonely Hearts Club"	February 10, 2005	Marissa Cooper (Mischa Barton) and Alex Kelly (Olivia Wilde)
The O.C.	"The Rainy Day Women"	February 24, 2005	Marissa Cooper (Mischa Barton) and Alex Kelly (Olivia Wilde). Alex leaves the series four episodes later.
American Dad!	"Not Particularly Desperate Housewives"	December 18, 2005	Linda Memari and Francine Smith. Linda is a closeted lesbian who kisses Francine to save her from being killed by the Ladybugs. Linda is genuinely attracted to Francine; however, Francine thinks the kiss was fake. Linda appears in other episodes; however, Linda's sexual interest in Francine is not discussed.
Crossing Jordan	"Mysterious Ways"	April 23, 2006	Jordan Cavanaugh (Jill Hennessy) and Detective Tallulah "Lu" Simmons (Leslie Bibb). Episode hints at the possible bisexuality of lead character Jordan. Bibb was a recurring cast member.
How I Met Your Mother	"Best Prom Ever"	May 1, 2006	Lily Aldrin (Alyson Hannigan) and Robin Scherbatsky (Cobie Smulders). Robin kisses Lily to give Lily the "lesbian experience" she never had. Both are series regulars.
How I Met Your Mother	"Big Days"	September 20, 2010	Barney Stinson (Neil Patrick Harris), Ted Mosby (Josh Radnor), and Robin Scheerbatsky all witness a kiss at MacLaren's Pub between Ted's ex-girlfriend Cindy (Rachel Bilson) and her date (Kaylee DeFer).
How I Met Your Mother	"The Broath"	March 19, 2012	Robin Scherbatsky and Lily Aldrin kiss in order to seal an oath promising not to interfere with Barney's life, along with Marshall and Ted, who also share a kiss.
How I Met Your Mother	"Rally"	February 24, 2014	Robin Scherbatsky and Lily Aldrin decide to make out after Robin suggests the ploy in order to wake up a hungover Barney. Lily willingly joins along with Robin and proceeds to make out with her female companion in a blithe fashion. Consequently, this would lead to Robin offering Lily another opportunity to make out after the issue had been resolved, however, Lily declines the wanton approach.
Las Vegas	"Fleeting Cheating Meeting"	January 12, 2007	Samantha Marquez (Vanessa Marcil) and Mary McConnell (Nikki Cox). Samantha and Mary, both series regulars, were portrayed as heterosexual although dialogue in several episodes indicates Samantha's possible bisexuality.
Dirt	"Ita Missa Est"	March 27, 2007	Lucy Spiller (Courteney Cox) and Tina Harrod (Jennifer Aniston). The episode hints at a former intimate relationship between the two. Tina never reappears on the series.
Kyle XY	"Free to Be You and Me"	July 23, 2007	Lori Trager (April Matson) and Hillary (Chelan Simmons). Hillary was a recurring character.
The Simpsons	"How the Test Was Won"	March 1, 2009	Marge Simpson & Lindsey Naegle (the point where Marge's book club members were tortured in Homer's dream)
The Simpsons	"Moms I'd Like to Forget"	January 9, 2011	The Cool Moms (after Marge left the group on the other night)
The Simpsons	"Lisa Goes Gaga"	May 20, 2012	Marge Simpsons & Lady Gaga (during the kitchen clip)
The Simpsons	"Mad About the Toy"	January 6, 2019	Women in the village reunite after her husband sadly leaves.
Desperate Housewives	"The Story of Lucie and Jessie"	March 15, 2009	Susan and her boss, Jessie; Susan and Gabrielle. Susan (Teri Hatcher) and Gabrielle (Eva Longoria) were series regulars; Jessie (Swoosie Kurtz) was a guest star.
Greek	"Dearly Beloved"	May 4, 2009	Rebecca Logan (Dilshad Vadsaria) and Robyn Wylie (Anna Osceola).
Greek	"Divine Secrets and the ZBZ Sisterhood"	May 18, 2009	Rebecca and Robyn; Rebecca and Casey Cartwright. The kiss in "Dearly Beloved" opened a three-episode story arc in which Rebecca questions her sexuality. The arc culminated in "Divine Secrets" with Rebecca deciding that she was not a LUG and her response to the kiss was because it was a new and unusual experience. Robyn did not reappear.
The Cleveland Show	"Pilot"	September 27, 2009	Lois Griffin (Alex Borstein) and Bonnie Swanson (Jennifer Tilly). The two kiss at the behest of lead character Cleveland as something of a going-away present.
Heroes	"Hysterical Blindness"	October 12, 2009	Claire Bennet (Hayden Panettiere) and Gretchen Berg (Madeline Zima). Gretchen kisses Claire and confesses to having a crush. Panettiere, who has acknowledged "experimenting" with female friends as a teenager, persuaded the creators to include the storyline. Zima's character was a recurring role. Heroes had previously planned a lesbian cheerleader character in 2007 but the actress took another job after just one episode and the part was not re-cast.
FlashForward	"Gimme Some Truth"	October 22, 2009	Janis Hawk (Christine Woods) and Maya (Navi Rawat). Janis is a closeted FBI agent and Maya is a chef. Maya did not reappear on the series.
Gossip Girl	"They Shoot Humphreys, Don't They?"	November 9, 2009	Vanessa Abrams (Jessica Szohr) and Olivia Burke (Hilary Duff). The two kiss as part of a threesome with Dan Humphrey (Penn Badgley). Duff's character was a recurring role.
90210	"Rats and Heroes"	March 9, 2010	Gia (Rumer Willis) and Adrianna (Jessica Lowndes) kiss after bonding at an Alcoholics Anonymous meeting. Willis' character was a recurring role.
Community	"Early 21st Century Romanticism"	February 10, 2011	Britta (Gillian Jacobs) and Page (Brit Marling). Britta and Page become friends and later kiss, each under the mistaken impression that the other is a lesbian. Page did not reappear in the series.
Pan Am	"Diplomatic Relations"	January 15, 2012	Maggie (Christina Ricci) and Amanda (Ashley Greene). Amanda comforts a sad Maggie by wiping Maggie's tears, then telling her opinion on men, and kissing her. Greene's character was recurring; her sexual orientation formed part of a recurring story arc. Maggie's reaction to the kiss was discussed in later episodes.
Orange Is the New Black	"I Wasn't Ready"	July 11, 2013	Piper Chapman (Taylor Schilling) & Alex Vause (Laura Prepon)
Orange Is the New Black	"Thirsty Bird"	June 6, 2014	Piper Chapman (Taylor Schilling) & Alex Vause (Laura Prepon) during a swimming pool scene
Orange Is the New Black	"You Also Had a Pizza"	June 6, 2014	Poussey & a German girl
Orange Is the New Black	"Little Mustachioed S**t"	June 6, 2014	Piper Chapman (Taylor Schilling) & Alex Vause (Laura Prepon)
Mistresses	"Decisions, Decisions"	July 1, 2013	Josslyn Carver (Jes Macallan) & Alex (Shannyn Sossamon) in the shower
Riverdale	"Chapter One: The River's Edge"	January 26, 2017	Betty Cooper (Lili Reinhart) and Veronica Lodge (Camila Mendes). Veronica and Betty auditioned together for the cheer team (the Riverdale Vixens). At the end of the routine, the judges do not seem very impressed so Veronica initiates a kiss with Betty for a shock factor. After some more persuading by Veronica, they both make the team.
Grey's Anatomy	"Back Where You Belong"	February 23, 2017	Arizona Robbins (Jessica Capshaw) and Eliza Minnick (Marika Domińczyk)
Steven Universe	"Reunited"	July 6, 2018	Sapphire (Erica Luttrell) and Ruby (Charlyne Yi). "First same-sex kiss on the lips involving a major character in American children-oriented animation history."
Roswell, New Mexico	"Sex and Candy"	April 20, 2020	Isobel Evans (Lily Cowles) and Blaire.

== See also ==
- Bury your gays
- Queerbaiting
