= Lisa Banes =

American actress (1955–2021)

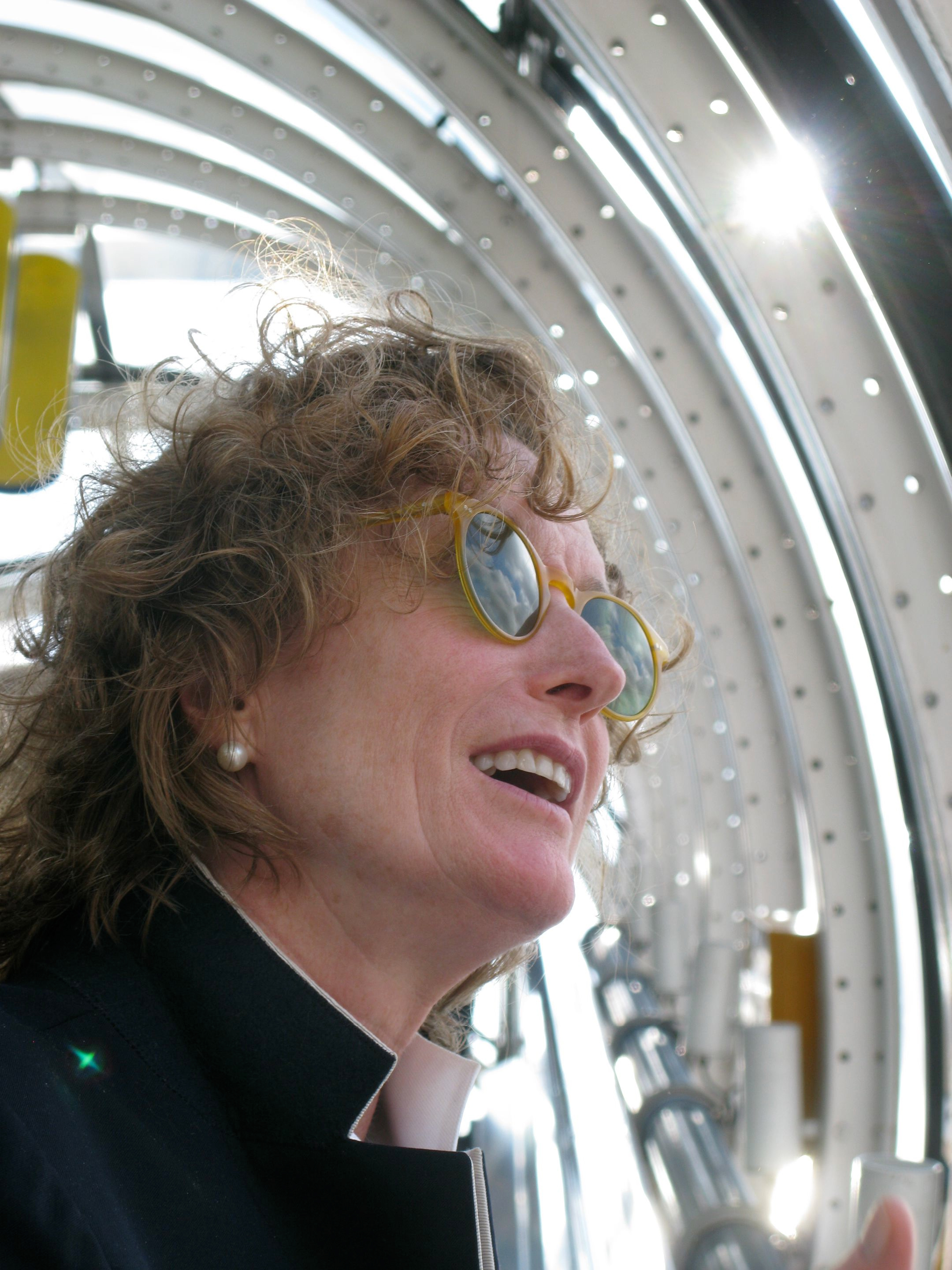
- Banes at the Centre Pompidou, Paris, 2009
- Born: July 9, 1955; Chagrin Falls, Ohio, U.S.
- Died: June 14, 2021 (aged 65); New York City, U.S.
- Education: Juilliard School (BFA)
- Occupation: Actress
- Years active: 1980–2021
- Spouse: Kathryn Kranhold

Lisa Lou Banes (July 9, 1955 – June 14, 2021) was an American actress known for more than 80 film and television roles, including as Marybeth Elliott, mother of Amy Elliott, in the 2014 film Gone Girl, as well as for stage appearances on Broadway and elsewhere.

== Early life and education ==
Banes was born in Chagrin Falls, Ohio, the daughter of Ken Banes, an advertiser, and Mary Lou (Shalenhamer) Banes, a model, and raised in Colorado Springs, where she attended Cheyenne Mountain High School. After acting professionally from the age of 15, she studied at the Juilliard School in New York City in the 1970s.

== Career ==
=== Stage ===
Banes found quick success on the New York stage. In 1980, she played Alison Porter in the Roundabout Theatre's production of John Osborne's Look Back in Anger and won a Theatre World Award for her performance. In 1981, in James M. Barrie's The Admirable Crichton, at the Long Wharf Theatre in New Haven, Connecticut, a New York Times critic, Mel Gussow, praised the "panache" with which as Lady Mary she transformed into "a kind of Jane of the jungle". She subsequently had lead roles in Wendy Kesselman's My Sister in This House, in Chekhov's Three Sisters, and was nominated for a Drama Desk Award for her role in Wendy Wasserstein's Isn't It Romantic in 1984.

Banes appeared on Broadway several times, beginning with the role of Cassie in the Neil Simon play Rumors in 1988. In 1995, she played Lady Croom in the American premiere of Tom Stoppard's Arcadia. Other appearances included the Broadway premieres of Tom Stoppard's Arcadia in 1995 and the musical High Society in 1998, Accent on Youth in 2009, and most recently the 2010 revival of Noël Coward's Present Laughter. She continued to appear in non-Broadway stage productions; in 2018 she shared the lead in the premiere of Eleanor Burgess's The Niceties at the Huntington Theater in Boston; the following year she repeated the role at the Geffen Playhouse in Los Angeles.

== Film ==
Banes's first film role was as Mrs. Berry in The Hotel New Hampshire in 1984. In her first major on-screen role, she played Tom Cruise's girlfriend Bonnie in Cocktail (1988); later film roles included Flora in Dragonfly (2002), and Christina Ricci's mother in Pumpkin (2002). In 2014, she appeared in David Fincher's Gone Girl as Marybeth Elliott, mother of Amy Elliott, the role for which she became best known. Other film appearances included A Cure for Wellness in 2016.

=== Television ===
On television, Banes had regular roles as Doreen Morrison in The Trials of Rosie O'Neill, as Ellen Collins on Royal Pains, and as Mayor Anita Massengil on the Fox comedy series Son of the Beach (2000–01). She also had recurring roles on The King of Queens as Carrie's boss Georgia Boone, Six Feet Under as Victoria, on One Life to Live as Eve McBain, and on Nashville Season 6 as the Ranch Director. She also guest starred as a Trill doctor in the Star Trek: Deep Space Nine episode "Equilibrium". Banes played Anne Kane in the 1985 TV miniseries Kane & Abel. Her other television credits include China Beach; Murder, She Wrote; The Practice; NYPD Blue; Desperate Housewives; Law & Order: Special Victims Unit; The Good Wife; NCIS; and Once Upon a Time. Her last work was on episodes of The Orville and Them.

== Personal life ==
Banes married Kathryn Kranhold, a reporter for the Center for Public Integrity, in 2017. They lived in Los Angeles.

=== Death ===
On June 4, 2021, Banes was visiting friends in New York and was in a marked crosswalk on Amsterdam Avenue approaching the Juilliard School when she was struck by a person operating an electric scooter. The scooter rider, who had gone through a red light, fled the scene of the hit and run collision. Banes was admitted to Mount Sinai Morningside Hospital with a traumatic brain injury and died there on June 14 at the age of 65. The suspect immediately drove 4 miles (6.4 km) to an Upper Manhattan shop to get his vehicle fixed.

On August 5, 2021, police arrested 26-year old Brian Boyd at his apartment in the Amsterdam Houses, near where he ran down Banes. He was jailed on a bail of $30,000 cash or $100,000 bond. He was charged with leaving the scene of an accident resulting in death, and failure to yield to a pedestrian. On September 28, 2022, Boyd pleaded guilty to manslaughter; on November 30, 2022, he was sentenced to up to three years in prison.

== Honors ==
Banes won a 1981 Theatre World Award for her performance as Alison Porter in Look Back in Anger. In 1984, she was nominated for a Drama Desk Award for Best Featured Actress in a Play for Isn't it Romantic.

== Filmography ==
=== Film ===
Year	Title	Role	Notes
1984	The Hotel New Hampshire	Mother	
1985	Marie	Toni Greer	
1988	Cocktail	Bonnie	
1988	Young Guns	Mallory	
1995	Miami Rhapsody	Gynecologist	
1998	Without Limits	Elfriede Prefontaine	
2002	Pumpkin	Chippy McDuffy	
2002	Dragonfly	Flora	
2007	Freedom Writers	Karin Polachek	
2008	Brothel	Priscilla	
2009	Legally Blondes	Headmistress Higgins	
2014	Gone Girl	Marybeth Elliott	
2016	A Cure for Wellness	Hollis	
2017	Six Women	Holly	Short film

=== Television ===
Year	Title	Role	Notes
1985	Spenser: For Hire	Meghan Farrell	Episode "No Room at the Inn"
1985	Look Back in Anger	Allison Porter	TV movie
1986	One Police Plaza	Erica	TV movie
1986	The Equalizer	Allison	Episode: "Nightscape"
1987	Leg Work	Celia Checkman	Episodes: "Pilot", "The Art of Murder"
1988	Hemingway	Martha Gelhorn	Television miniseries, Main cast
1989	Life Goes On	Kathryn Henning	Episode: "Paige's Mom"
1989	China Beach	Cat Von Steeger	Episodes: "How to Stay Alive in Vietnam (Parts 1 & 2)"
1990	American Dreamer	Jessica	Episode: Pilot
1990	A Killer Among Us	Joanna Westrope	TV movie
1990	Close Encounter	Andrea Griffin	TV movie
1990–1992	The Trials of Rosie O'Neill	Doreen Morrison	Main cast
1992	The Presence	Diana	TV movie
1993	Revenge on the Highway	Vi Sams	TV movie
1993	A Family Torn Apart	Barbara Forester	TV movie
1993	Gloria Vane	Doreen	TV movie
1993	L.A. Law	Cara Mitchell	Episode: "Leap of Faith"
1993	Sisters	Barbara Buckley	Episode: "The Good Daughter"
1994	Star Trek: Deep Space Nine	Doctor Renhol	Episode: "Equilibrium"
1994	Roseanne	Mrs. Simms	Episode: "White Men Can't Kiss"
1994	Cries from the Heart	Ms. Tolbert	TV movie
1995	Murder, She Wrote	Lucy Hedrix	Episode: "Shooting in Rome"
1995	High Society	Tippi Von Schlaugger	Episode: "The Naked and the Deadline"
1995	The Avenging Angel	Rebecca Heaton	TV movie
1996	My Son is Innocent	Lisa Eubanks	TV movie
1996	Last Exit to Earth	Elder	TV movie
1996	Mother, May I Sleep with Danger?	Jessica Lewsohn	TV movie
1996	Murder One	Vivien Barone	Episode: "Chapter Ten"
1996	Frasier	Pamela	Episode: "A Lilith Thanksgiving"
1998	Michael Hayes	Madeline	Episodes: "Imagine (Parts 1 & 2)
1999	Too Rich: The Secret Life of Doris Duke	Barbara Hutton	Television miniseries
1999	Legacy	Georgina Winters	4 episodes
2000–2001	Son of the Beach	Mayor Anita Massengil	Main cast (seasons 1–2)
2002	Philly	Carolyn Minelli	Episode: "Lies of Minelli"
2002	The Practice	Judge Samantha Cooke	Episode: "Eat and Run"
2002	Girls Club	Meredith Holt	Recurring role (canceled after 2 episodes)
2004	One Life to Live	Eve McBain	13 episodes
2004	It's All Relative	Viveca	Episode: "Ready, Aim, Sing"
2004	NYPD Blue	Defense Attorney	Episode: " Divorce, Detective Style"
2004	Combustion	Mayor Wallker	TV movie
2004	King of Queens	Georgia Boone	2 episodes
2005	Jake in Progress	Valerie Page	Episode: "Harpy Birthday"
2005	Six Feet Under	Victoria	3 episodes
2005	Out of Practice	Chef Vivian	Episode: "Key Ingredients"
2005	Boston Legal	Attorney Kimberly Mellon	Episode: "Truly, Madly, Deeply"
2006	In Justice	D.A. Margaret Mannheim	Episode: "Another Country"
2006	The Unit	Dr. Rhea Morrison	Episode: "SERE"
2006	Saved	Dr. Victoria Cole	Episodes: "Fog" and "Family"
2006	Desperate Housewives	Vera Keck	Episode: "Like It Was"
2007	Psych	Edna Crocker	Episode: "Forget Me Not"
2010	The Good Wife	Georgia McGowen	Episode: "Cleaning House"
2011	Law & Order: Special Victims Unit	Elaine Fyre Cavanaugh	Episode: "Totem"
2011	How to be a Gentleman	Madeline	Episode: "How to Attend Your Ex-Fiance's Wedding"
2012	Perception	Irene Reardon	Episodes: "Nemesis", "Kilimanjaro"
2015	NCIS	Ambassador Olivia Edmunds	Episode: "Patience"
2016	Rosewood	Esther Wilford	Episode: "Hydrocephalus and Hard Knocks"
2010–2016	Royal Pains	Ellen Collins	9 episodes
2016	Once Upon a Time	Lady Tremaine	Episode: "The Other Shoe"
2016	Masters of Sex	Nina Clavermore	Episodes: "Outliers", "Topeka"
2016	Madam Secretary	Arabelle Marsh	Episode: "Tectonic Shift"
2018	Nashville	Ranch Director	4 episodes
2021	Them	Esther Haber	Episode "Day 6"
2022	The Orville	Speria Balask	3 episodes; Posthumous release
