= The Host (Star Trek: The Next Generation) =

- Star Trek: The Next Generation episode
- Episode no.: Season 4 Episode 23
- Directed by: Marvin V. Rush
- Written by: Michel Horvat
- Production code: 197
- Original air date: May 11, 1991

Guest appearances
- Barbara Tarbuck – Leka Trion; Nicole Orth-Pallavicini – Kareel Odan; William Newman – Kalin Trose; Patti Yasutake – Nurse Alyssa Ogawa; Franc Luz – Odan

Episode chronology
← Previous "Half a Life"	Next → "The Mind's Eye"
- Star Trek: The Next Generation season 4

"The Host" is the 23rd episode of the fourth season of the American science fiction television series Star Trek: The Next Generation and the 97th episode overall. It was originally released on May 11, 1991, in broadcast syndication.

Set in the 24th century, the series follows the adventures of the Starfleet crew of the Federation starship Enterprise-D. In this episode, Doctor Beverly Crusher (Gates McFadden) falls in love with Odan (Franc Luz), a Trill mediator. But after he is mortally injured, she discovers that "Odan" is actually a symbiotic creature that lives inside a humanoid host body. Commander William Riker (Jonathan Frakes) volunteers to act as a temporary host, complicating the relationship between Crusher and Odan. The mediation proves successful, but after Odan is transferred to a new, female Trill host (Nicole Orth-Pallavicini), Crusher chooses not to continue the relationship.

At the time of filming, McFadden was seven months pregnant, resulting in filming techniques used to conceal her abdomen. A two-part makeup appliance was designed for the Trill host, as well as the symbiont itself, which was based on a caterpillar and an octopus. The Trill would subsequently return in Star Trek: Deep Space Nine, although the makeup was redesigned. "The Host" received a Nielsen rating of 11.3 percent during the first week of release in syndication.

It was the first episode to be directed by Marvin V. Rush, the director of photography, and was written by Michel Horvat.

== Plot ==
Odan (Franc Luz), a mediator, boards the Enterprise to negotiate a peace treaty between two hostile groups. Doctor Beverly Crusher (Gates McFadden) is charmed by the man, and the two share a love affair during the trip. Odan refuses to use the transporter and requests that a shuttle and pilot be provided for him; Commander William Riker (Jonathan Frakes) honors this request. During the mission, the shuttle is attacked by a dissident faction and Odan is mortally injured. While trying to save the alien in sickbay, Dr. Crusher comes to learn that Odan is a Trill, a species which symbiotically lives within its host's body. It is further revealed by Lt. Commander Data (Brent Spiner) that the transporter would have harmed the symbiotic lifeform. Following the death of Odan's host body, Commander Riker volunteers to allow Odan to use him as a host to conduct the necessary negotiations until a new host arrives.

Odan's presence becomes dominating over Riker, and Dr. Crusher finds herself initially confused when Odan continues to try to engage with her to continue their relationship. Dr. Crusher is puzzled and full of emotion as she later confides to Counselor Deanna Troi (Marina Sirtis) and wonders about the true depth of her feelings for Odan. With some effort, Odan in Riker's body manages to convince the delegates from the warring planets to work with him. However, Riker's body begins to deteriorate due to the incompatibility of different biologies. The ship transporting the new host has encountered engine malfunctions. Dr. Crusher does everything she can to extend Riker's and Odan's chances while the Enterprise races to meet the Trill ship, and has a deeply emotional moment with Captain Jean-Luc Picard (Patrick Stewart).

The Enterprise successfully rendezvous in time to bring aboard the new host, a female (Nicole Orth-Pallavicini), much to Dr. Crusher's surprise. She helps with the other Trill to transplant Odan into the new host, and both Riker and Odan fully recover. When Odan attempts to continue their relationship, Dr. Crusher is uncomfortable because in her eyes Odan is now a woman, and she knows that Odan will continue to live on in any number of hosts' bodies. Odan states she still loves Dr. Crusher, but understands her confusion and discomfort, and promises to never forget her or their short time together. And Dr. Crusher replies that she loves Odan too; in Odan's new, female host body, Odan then kisses the inner wrist of her hand.

== Production ==
=== Direction and writing ===
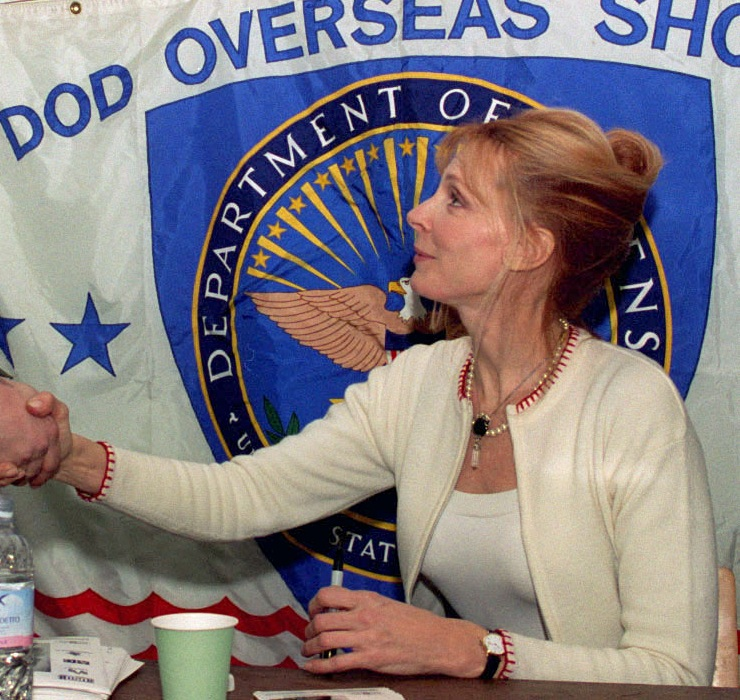
Gates McFadden was seven months pregnant at the time of filming "The Host".

"The Host" was written by Michel Horvat and directed by Marvin V. Rush. Rush had been the director of photography for the series since the start of the third season. The filming of Gates McFadden's scenes was complicated by the fact that she was seven months pregnant at the time, requiring different camera angles than would normally be used. Jonathan Frakes, who played Commander Riker, explained later that "they would not address the fact that the actress was pregnant", requiring the cast and crew to hide McFadden's stomach from the camera with furniture or by using camera angles which only showed her from her breasts upwards. Rush was not told which episode he was going to direct beforehand, other than that it was going to be a ship-based episode. He later directed two episodes of Star Trek: Voyager and two of Star Trek: Enterprise.

Story editor Brannon Braga was pleased with the episode, calling it "one of the most outstanding stories we've ever done" as it was originally suggested as a "squirmy worm" story, which was "unique" as it went on to become "the most touching love story". Ronald D. Moore stated that it had become a Star Trek story by focusing the episode on the relationship rather than on the negotiations. Rush suggested that some viewers were disappointed with the ending, due to Crusher not accepting her lover in his new female body. He said that it was a valid point of view, and that McFadden's lines in the final scene made it clear that it put forward a hope that homosexuality would be better accepted in the future. The subject matter was revisited in the Star Trek: Deep Space Nine episode "Rejoined", which featured one of the earliest televised lesbian kisses.

The character of Odan would return in non-canonical Star Trek publications, including in the short story "First Steps" within The Lives of Dax anthology. It also made two appearances in licensed comics, first in DC Comics Star Trek: The Next Generation Annual issue four and then in Divided we Fall, a crossover between The Next Generation and Deep Space Nine published under the WildStorm imprint.

=== Makeup and set design ===
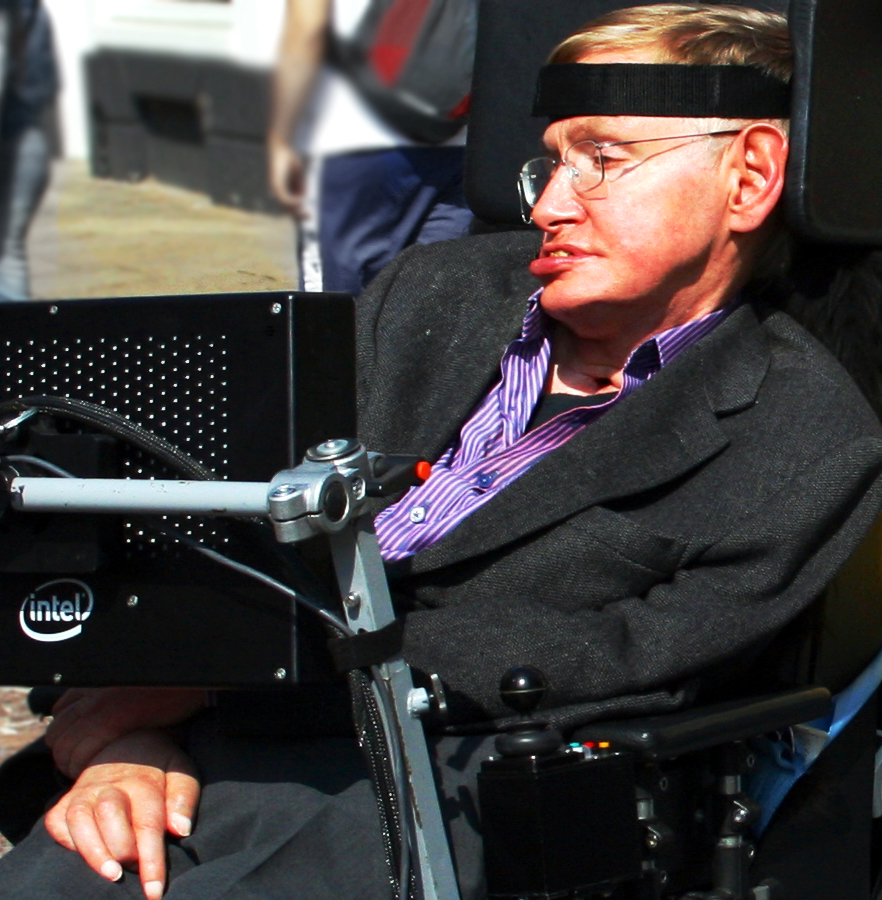
The shuttlecraft in "The Host" was named for Stephen Hawking.

The makeup for the Trill host featured separate nose and forehead pieces, as the intention was to retain the general look of a human. Air bladders were placed inside a fake abdomen to create the shot in which the symbiont appeared to move under the host's skin. A second fake abdomen was created for the surgery scene in which the symbiont is moved into Riker, which worked by having a crew member lie under the surgery table, pulling the symbiont into the opening using a concealed string. The design of the symbiont was based on a caterpillar with an octopus for a head, which featured a further air bladder in order to give the appearance that it was pulsating, and painted in fluorescent paint to glow when a black light was shone on it during that scene.

The Trill later recurred in Deep Space Nine, with multiple hosts of the Dax symbiont appearing on screen. The same makeup was initially used as in their originally appearance in The Next Generation, however after two days of filming with Terry Farrell in the prosthetics, she was sent back to the makeup department to change it. The shuttle set was the same one which had been used previously, with parts created for different episodes since work began in the first season episode "Coming of Age". In "The Host", it was named Hawking for the theoretical physicist Stephen Hawking.

== Reception and home media release ==
"The Host" aired in broadcast syndication during the week commencing May 12, 1991. It received Nielsen ratings of 11.3, reflecting the percentage of all households watching the episode during its timeslot. This placed it as the highest viewed syndicated show of the week, despite the ratings being near the average for the season.

James Van Hise, in his book The Unauthorized Trek: The Complete Next Generation, called the introduction of the Trill an "element crucial" to Deep Space Nine, but was critical of the decision to have Crusher not be interested in Odan once he had transferred to his new female host. This "apparent homophobia" was said to have resulted in the episode being "widely criticized" by David Greven in his book Gender and Sexuality in Star Trek. Keith DeCandido, in an article for Reactor, wrote it was difficult to give a fair review of the episode due to the Trill being explored in greater depth in Deep Space Nine, and the subsequent alterations made for that series compared to "The Host". He said more generally of the episode that the romance felt rushed, and he would have liked to see the exploration of Riker's feelings about his body being used to have sex with a friend. A further criticism was leveled at the ending, as Crusher's statements implied it was humans who have a problem with homosexuality and bisexuality rather than limiting it to be her own problem. He gave it a rating of four out of ten.

Nick Keppler, writing for Nerve.com, listed "The Host" as one of the "gayest" episodes of the franchise and described the twist at the end of the episode with the gender of Odan's new host as "sapphic". He criticized the reaction of Crusher at the end of the episode, saying that she would "get into bed with shifty aliens with weird ridged foreheads but for some reason draws the line at space ladies". Zack Handlen gave the episode a rating of B+ in his review for The A.V. Club, saying that the idea at the core of the episode was better than the execution. But he said that the ending made "perfect sense" as he said that love wasn't solely spiritual but that "we fall in love with features, with shapes, with bodies, as well as with minds." He added that Odan's reaction was also right, as "everyone has a line, and if you love them, you won't ask them to cross it." Robin Roberts wrote that this episode and "The Outcast" were the episodes of The Next Generation that dealt most overtly with sexual orientation, although Roberts thought the depiction in "The Outcast" was handled somewhat better.

The first home media release of "The Host" was on VHS cassette, appearing on July 23, 1996, in the United States and Canada. The episode was later included on the Star Trek: The Next Generation season four DVD box set, released in the United States on September 3, 2002. The fourth season was subsequently released on blu-ray in the UK on July 29, 2013, and July 30 in the United States.
