= The Lake (1998 film) =

- Yasmine Bleeth on the DVD cover
- Written by: Alan Brennert
- Story by: J.D. Fiegelson
- Directed by: David Jackson
- Starring: Yasmine Bleeth; Linden Ashby; Haley Joel Osment; Susanna Thompson; Stanley Anderson
- Theme music composer: Don Davis
- Country of origin: United States
- Original language: English

Production
- Producer: Andrew Gottlieb
- Cinematography: Denis Maloney
- Editor: Craig Ridenour

Original release
- Network: NBC
- Release: February 1, 1998

The Lake is a 1998 made-for-TV, science fiction thriller movie starring Yasmine Bleeth.

== Plot ==
Jackie Ivers (Bleeth) is a Los Angeles nurse who returns home to the small town of San Vicente to find that her friends and family have taken on bizarrely different personalities. Jackie notices that everyone who goes into the town's lake come out different.

As the movie progresses, Jackie first-handedly witnesses what is happening to everyone around her as she is kidnapped by people from a parallel world. The other world is a duplicate of Earth but is now polluted and its ozone layer gone. In order to survive, the duplicates intend to take over Earth. The entrances to the duplicate Earth are called the vortex, which are located in major bodies of water, ponds, and lakes.

== Cast ==
- Yasmine Bleeth as Jackie Ivers
- Linden Ashby as Dr. Jeff Chapman
- Haley Joel Osment as Dylan Hydecker
- Susanna Thompson as Denise Hydecker
- Stanley Anderson as Steve Ivers
- Caroline Lagerfelt as Mayor Louise Terry
- Monique Edwards as Young Nurse
- Robert Prosky as Herb
- Marion Ross as Maggie
