= Brian Baker (actor) =

American actor (born 1967)

- Born: Brian Edward Baker; July 16, 1967 (age 59); Philadelphia, Pennsylvania, U.S.
- Occupation: Actor
- Years active: 1998–present
- Spouse: Terry Farrell (m. 2002; div. 2015)
- Children: 1

Brian Edward Baker (born July 16, 1967) is an American actor best known for his recurring role as a trenchcoated spokesman in Sprint's television commercials.

== Early life and education ==
Baker was born in Philadelphia, on July 16, 1967. He began his acting career at the age of 11 as a member of a now-defunct community film enthusiast club known as Cinekyd, based in Willow Grove, Pennsylvania, where youngsters acted in, directed, edited, and produced amateur movies under adult supervision.

Baker attended William Tennent High School in Warminster, Pennsylvania, where he graduated in 1985. He attended Penn State University, where he became a member of Phi Kappa Theta and earned a Bachelor of Arts in marketing in 1990.

After graduating from Penn State, he studied at The Second City improvisational comedy troupe in Chicago, while also working as a stand-up comedian and in the Seanachai Theatre Company. To make ends meet, he waited tables at John's Place in Chicago's Lincoln Park neighborhood.

== Career ==
In 1998, Baker moved to Los Angeles. Within six weeks, he had landed a role as The Sprint Guy. Although originally contracted to appear in only five advertisements, the overwhelming popularity of the commercials led to Baker's appearance in 155 spots over six years. In 2001, People named him in their "50 Most Beautiful People" list, dubbing him "Sexiest Pitchman". Baker's image appeared all over Sprint's in-store signage, printed material, and the company's website, providing a human face for an otherwise faceless telecommunications behemoth. The 2005 merger of Sprint and rival Nextel spelled the end of the commercials when the company implemented a "new look" campaign, and marketing for the new company was handed over to Nextel's ad agency.

=== Television work ===
In addition to his work in commercials, Baker has appeared in Spider-Noir, Chicago Fire, Chicago Med, 9-1-1, All's Fair, Presumed Innocent, and Suits LA. He appears as Representative John Tandy on the television series The West Wing and guest-starred on episodes of Providence, The Drew Carey Show, and V.I.P.

== Personal life ==
Baker lives in Chicago and Los Angeles. He was married to actress Terry Farrell, with whom he has one child. The couple divorced in 2015.

He is currently in a long-term relationship with the violinist-composer Susan Voelz.
