= Dax (Star Trek: Deep Space Nine episode) =

- Star Trek: Deep Space Nine episode
- Episode no.: Season 1 Episode 8
- Directed by: David Carson
- Story by: Peter Allan Fields
- Teleplay by: D. C. Fontana; Peter Allan Fields
- Production code: 408
- Original air date: February 15, 1993

Guest appearances
- Gregory Itzin as Ilon Tandro; Anne Haney as Judge Renora; Richard Lineback as Selin Peers; Fionnula Flanagan as Enina Tandro

Episode chronology
← Previous "Q-Less"	Next → "The Passenger"
- Star Trek: Deep Space Nine season 1

"Dax" is the eighth episode of the American science fiction television series Star Trek: Deep Space Nine.

Set in the 24th century, the series follows the adventures on Deep Space Nine, a space station located adjacent to a stable wormhole between the Alpha and Gamma quadrants of the Milky Way Galaxy, near the planet Bajor.

This episode explores the nature of the fictional Trill species, a humanoid race some of whom are symbiotically "joined" to a long-lived "symbiont" creature, whose memories they share. The station's science officer Jadzia Dax, a Trill, is arrested for a crime of which a previous host of her symbiont is accused.

This episode was co-written by D.C. Fontana, who had also written for Star Trek: The Original Series.

== Plot ==
After having a meal with Dr. Bashir, Lt. Dax is abducted by a group of aliens while walking back to her quarters. Dr. Bashir alerts Commander Sisko that she has been taken, and the Deep Space Nine crew is able to prevent the abductors from leaving the station.

One of the abductors, Ilon Tandro, accuses Dax - the Dax symbiont, then in the body of Curzon Dax - of murdering his father, Ardelon Tandro, a famous military hero from Klaestron IV; he wants to punish Jadzia Dax for the crime. His claim is based on the fact that during a civil war a coded message informed the opposing side of his father's location, and of the people who knew the location, Curzon was the only one without an alibi.

Major Kira insists that Dax cannot be extradited to Klaestron without an arbitration hearing under Bajoran law; with the Bajorans threatening a diplomatic incident over Ilon attempting to kidnap Dax from what is technically Bajoran territory, he is forced to agree. At the hearing, Sisko argues that Jadzia and Curzon Dax are two different individuals, sparking a lengthy debate. The arbiter suggests removing the Dax symbiont and leaving Jadzia behind, but Dr. Bashir says that neither would survive the operation. Ilon argues that failure to punish Trill symbionts for acts committed in past lifetimes would create a perfect crime. Curiously, although her fate is uncertain, Jadzia seems complacent about the entire affair.

Meanwhile, DS9's security chief Odo visits Ilon's mother, Enina. She tells him that Tandro's murder inspired his people to victory, and he has since become a worldwide hero, but she is adamant that Curzon did not betray her husband. Odo discovers evidence of an affair between Curzon and Enina, giving him a motive for the murder. Enina admits the affair to Odo and tells him that her husband was not the hero in life that he was in death. As the hearing resumes, Enina testifies that at the time of the murder, Curzon was in her bed. The arbiter dismisses the case.

After the hearing is over, Enina talks privately with Dax of how no one must ever know that her husband had sent the coded message himself in an attempt to betray his own people, and that the rebels killed him for the favor.

== Production ==
This episode was written by D. C. Fontana, known for work on Star Trek: The Original Series. Peter Allan Fields had previously worked with Fontana on The Six Million Dollar Man. Fontana found that the story was focused on characters and that there was not a lot of action, but found it challenging, "as all early scripts in a series are", because you have not yet learned to write for a particular actor's voice and you have to invent facts about a character that may not work out later. Fields rewrote the script and decided that, instead of writing Dax as a wise old owl at peace with her many past lives, she would be in turmoil with the different personalities of past hosts influencing her behavior. This conflict is expressed in the moment when Jadzia Dax says goodbye to Enina Tandro, a former lover of Dax's previous host Curzon: It seems as if they are about to kiss. It was not until the fourth season episode "Rejoined" that the series would show two women kissing.

Fionnula Flanagan guest starred as Enina Tandro. It was her first appearance on Star Trek, and she later appeared on Star Trek: The Next Generation in the episode "Inheritance" as Juliana Soong, Data's "mother", and on Star Trek: Enterprise in the episode "Fallen Hero" as a Vulcan ambassador.

== Reception ==
Keith DeCandido of Tor.com rated the episode seven out of ten.

In 2018, SyFy included this episode on their Jadzia Dax binge-watching guide for this character. They note this episode helps build the relationship between Jadzia and Sisko, as well as explore the nature of Dax.

== Releases ==
On February 8, 1997 this episode was released on LaserDisc in Japan as part of the half-season box set 1st Season Vol. 1. This included episodes from "Emissary" to "Move Along Home" with both English and Japanese audio tracks.
