= Starship Down =

- Star Trek: Deep Space Nine episode
- Episode no.: Season 4 Episode 8
- Directed by: Alexander Singer
- Written by: David Mack; John J. Ordover
- Production code: 479
- Original air date: November 13, 1995

Guest appearances
- James Cromwell as Hanok; F. J. Rio as Muniz; Jay W. Baker as Stevens; Sara Mornell as Carson

Episode chronology
← Previous "Rejoined"	Next → "The Sword of Kahless"

"Starship Down" is the 79th episode of the science fiction television series Star Trek: Deep Space Nine, the eighth episode of the fourth season.

Set in the 24th century, the series follows the adventures on Deep Space Nine, a space station located near a stable wormhole between the Alpha and Gamma quadrants of the galaxy; the Gamma Quadrant is home to a powerful empire known as the Dominion. In this episode, the Deep Space Nine staff host secret trade negotiations with a Dominion subject aboard the starship Defiant, but the ship is heavily damaged in an attack by the Dominion's Jem'Hadar soldiers. This episode aired in broadcast syndication television on November 13, 1995.

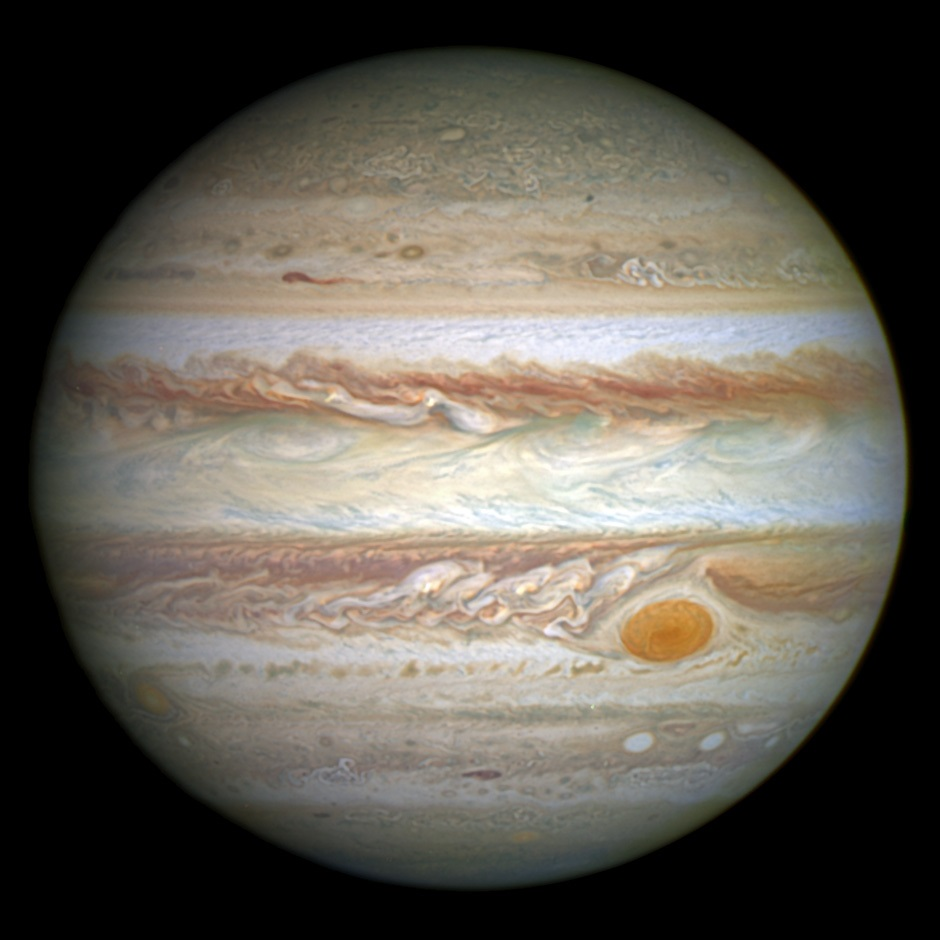
Many special effect scenes take place inside a gas giant. An example of this type is the real-life planet Jupiter (pictured)

== Writing ==
This episode was written by David Mack and John J. Ordover. Writer David Mack stated that the inspiration for this episode came from the 1981 Wolfgang Petersen film Das Boot. These two writers also wrote the Star Trek comic book series Divided We Fall.

== Plot ==
The Federation starship Defiant carries the senior staff of Deep Space Nine into the Gamma Quadrant to settle trade arrangements with the Karemma representative, Hanok. As the Dominion disapproves of trading with the Federation, the talks take place secretly in orbit around a gas giant and are mediated by the Ferengi Quark. Hanok is disgusted to learn that Quark has been lining his pockets by imposing fictitious Federation tariffs.

The negotiations are interrupted when a pair of Jem'Hadar ships fire on the Karemma ship. The Jem'Hadar chase the ship into the atmosphere of the gas giant, and the Defiant takes off in pursuit. The Jem'Hadar open fire on the Defiant, crippling it in the turbulent fluorine atmosphere of the planet.

Science Officer Jadzia Dax heads below to try to repair the engines. She is successful but is nearly blown out of the ship when the hull is breached. Dr. Bashir saves her, but they are trapped in a turbolift shaft with a diminishing supply of oxygen and without communication with the rest of the crew, who presume them lost.

One of the Jem'Hadar ships attacks. The Defiant destroys it, but not before it is able to render the Defiant helpless again; Captain Sisko is gravely injured with a concussion. Major Kira tends to him, trying to keep him conscious.

Quark is trapped in the mess hall with Hanok, where a live Jem'Hadar torpedo lodges itself in the hull. Combining their cleverness—and taking a gamble—to defuse the torpedo helps Hanok get over his mistrust of Quark. Dax and Bashir huddle together for warmth; Bashir appreciates the irony that being trapped with Jadzia in his arms was once a fantasy of his. On the bridge, Kira cares for Sisko, telling him a Bajoran fairy tale to try to keep him awake, and regretting that her reverence for him as the prophesied "Emissary" has prevented them from being closer friends. Lt. Cdr. Worf and Chief O'Brien work on putting the Defiant's engines back together; O'Brien helps Worf learn how to tactfully manage the engineering team. The Defiant is eventually able to destroy the second Jem'Hadar fighter and rescue the Karemma crew. Upon returning to Deep Space Nine, Hanok gambles at Quark's bar, and Sisko invites Kira to watch a baseball game with him in the holosuite.

== Reception ==
Tor.com was overall positive about this episode in their 2014 review, noting numerous guest stars and plot elements that are connected to later ones in the series.

In 2015, Geek.com recommended this episode as "essential watching" for their abbreviated Star Trek: Deep Space Nine binge-watching guide. Screenwriter David Mack said that he was overall happy with this episode but felt constrained by the episode's budget. This led him to write a more ambitious, but similar plot-type for the Star Trek novel Wildfire.

== Legacy ==
An episode of the third season of animated series Star Trek: Lower Decks titled "Hear All, Trust Nothing" directly follows plot elements from "Starship Down", featuring trade negotiations with the Karemma and appearances from Quark and Kira Nerys, with Armin Shimerman and Nana Visitor reprising their roles in the voice cast.
