= Susanna Thompson =

American actress (born 1958)

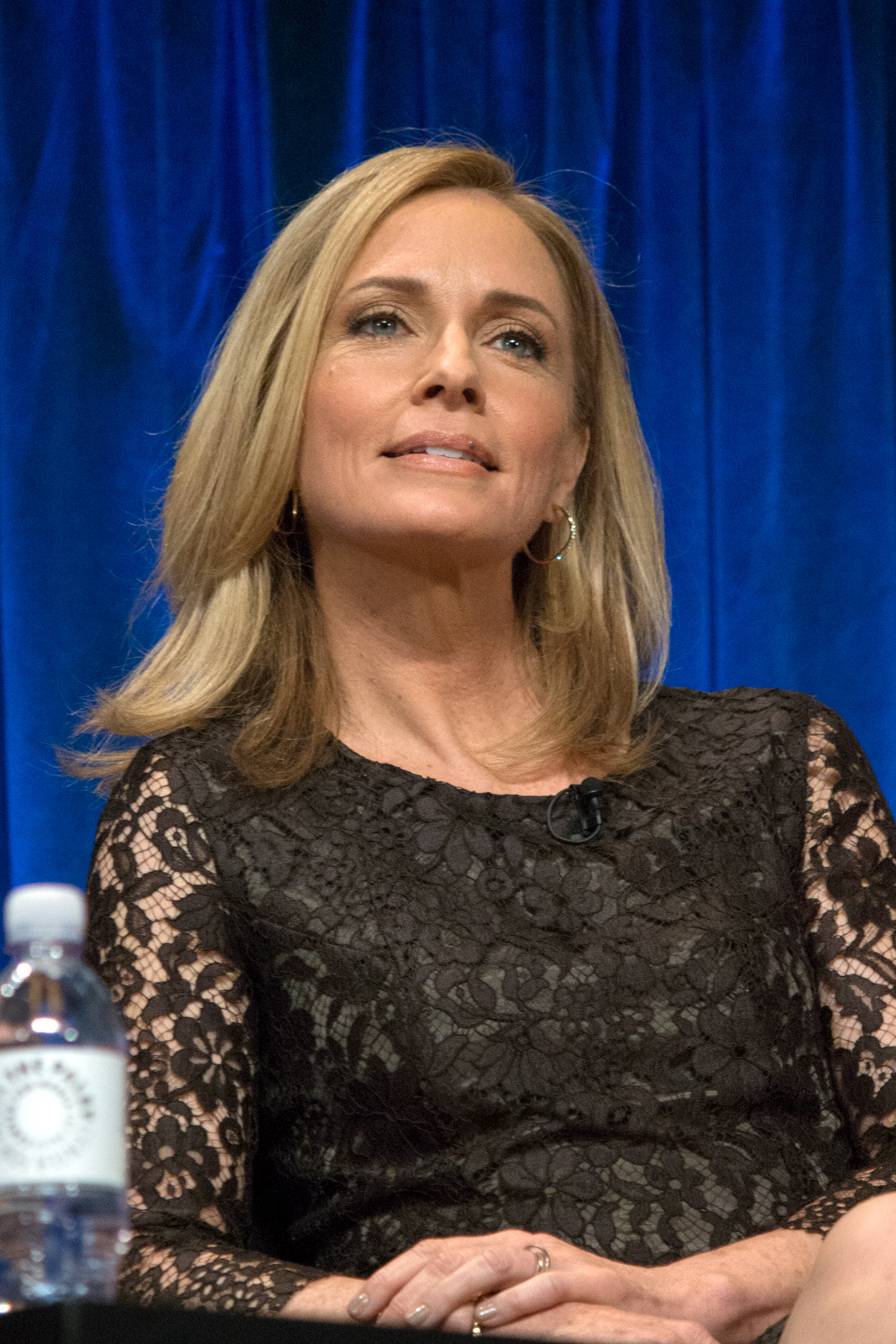
- Thompson at PaleyFest 2013
- Born: January 27, 1958 (age 68); San Diego, California, U.S.
- Education: San Diego State University
- Occupation: Actress
- Years active: 1991–present
- Spouse: Martin B. Katz

Susanna Thompson (born January 27, 1958) is an American actress. She is known for her roles in films Little Giants (1994), Ghosts of Mississippi (1996), Random Hearts (1999) and Dragonfly (2002). On television, she played Dr. Lenara Kahn in the episode "Rejoined" in Star Trek: Deep Space Nine (1995), the Borg Queen in three episodes of Star Trek: Voyager (1999–2000), Karen Sammler on the drama series Once and Again (1999–2002), and Moira Queen on the series Arrow (2012–2020).

== Career ==
Thompson may be best known for her television work, which includes playing Karen Sammler on Once and Again, Michelle Generoo in an episode of The X-Files and a recurring role as the Borg Queen in the Star Trek: Voyager two-part episodes "Dark Frontier" (1999) and "Unimatrix Zero" (2000). She also portrayed Denise Hydecker in the 1998 television film The Lake.

One of Thompson's most controversial television appearances was on an episode of Star Trek: Deep Space Nine titled "Rejoined". In the episode, she participated in one of US television's earlier same-sex kisses. The episode first aired on October 30, 1995.

She made a guest appearance on Law & Order: Special Victims Unit on October 7, 2003 in the season five episode "Mother", as Dr. Greta Heints, a psychiatrist who rehabilitates sex offenders to prepare them to return to society.

Beginning in January 2006, she had a starring role in the short-lived NBC drama The Book of Daniel. In November 2006, she made her first appearance as Army Lieutenant Colonel Hollis Mann on the CBS series NCIS, in the recurring role of Agent Gibbs' love interest. That same week, she appeared on Without a Trace.

In 2009, Thompson starred on the short-lived NBC series Kings, based on the biblical story of David, as Queen Rose Benjamin, an analogue of Ahinoam, the wife of Saul.

In 2012, Thompson started a two season run as Moira Queen in the main cast of the CW series Arrow, returning as a guest in later seasons. She appeared in the recurring role of Carolyn Preston in the NBC series Timeless (2016–2018).

== Personal life ==
Thompson earned her bachelor's degree in drama from San Diego State University. Her husband, Martin B. Katz, is a professor there.

== Filmography ==
=== Film ===
Year	Title	Role	Notes
1992	A Woman Scorned: The Betty Broderick Story	Receptionist	TV movie
1992	Calendar Girl, Cop, Killer? The Bambi Bembenek Story	Christine	TV movie
1993	Ambush in Waco: In the Line of Duty	Meg	TV movie
1993	Slaughter of the Innocents	Connie Collins	
1994	In the Line of Duty: The Price of Vengeance	—N/a	TV movie
1994	MacShayne: The Final Roll of the Dice	Janet	TV movie
1994	Alien Nation: Dark Horizon	Lorraine Clark	TV movie
1994	A Promise Kept: The Oksana Baiul Story	Marina Baiul	TV movie
1994	When a Man Loves a Woman	Janet	
1994	Little Giants	Patty Floyd	
1996	America's Dream	Beth Ann	TV movie
1996	Bermuda Triangle	Grace	TV movie
1996	Ghosts of Mississippi	Peggy Lloyd	
1997	In the Line of Duty: Blaze of Glory	Sylvia Whitmire	TV movie
1998	The Lake	Denise Hydecker	TV movie
1999	The Caseys	—N/a	TV movie
1999	Random Hearts	Peyton Van Deck Broeck	
2000	High Noon	Amy Kane	TV movie
2002	Dragonfly	Emily Darrow	
2005	The Ballad of Jack and Rose	Miriam Rance	
2005	Hello	Rory	Short film
2007	The Gathering	Elaine Tanner	TV movie
2007	American Pastime	Shirley Burrell	
2009	The Whole Truth (2009)	Angela Masters	
2012	Unbanded	Jamie	
2018	The Public	Marcy Ramstead	
2021	Malignant	Jeanne Lake	

=== Television ===
Year	Title	Role	Notes
1991	Silk Stalkings	ADA Susan Harner	Episode: "Pilot"
1992	Civil Wars	Susan Phelan	Episode: "Denise and De Nuptials"
1992	Civil Wars	Lorraine Dallek	Episode: "Oboe Phobia"
1992	Star Trek: The Next Generation	Varel	Episode: "The Next Phase"
1993	Star Trek: The Next Generation	Inmate Jaya	Episode: "Frame of Mind"
1993	Bodies of Evidence	Elizabeth McCarty	Episode: "Flesh and Blood"
1993	The X-Files	Michelle Generoo	Episode: "Space"
1994	L.A. Law	Susan Allner	Episode: "Cold Cuts"
1995	NYPD Blue	Joyce Novak	2 episodes
1995	Star Trek: Deep Space Nine	Dr. Lenara Kahn	Episode: "Rejoined"
1995	Dr. Quinn, Medicine Woman	Anna Marie Sheehan	Episode: "Fifi's First Christmas"
1997	Roar	Gweneth	Episode: "Daybreak"
1998	Prey	Jane Daniels	2 episodes
1998	Players	Jean Cameron	Episode: "Con-undrum"
1998	Michael Hayes	Mrs. Boland	Episode: "Devotion"
1999	Chicago Hope	Francesca	Episode: "From Here to Maternity"
1999–2000	Star Trek: Voyager	Borg Queen	3 episodes
1999–2002	Once and Again	Karen Sammler	49 episodes
2002	The Twilight Zone	Annie MacIntosh	Episode: "Upgrade"
2003	Law & Order: Special Victims Unit	Dr. Greta Heints	Episode: "Mother"
2003–04	Still Life	Charlotte Morgan	TV series never aired; 5 episodes
2005	Medical Investigation	Dr. Kate Ewing	3 episodes
2005	Jake in Progress	Emma Taylor	Episode: "Harpy Birthday"
2006–15	NCIS	Army Lt. Col. Hollis Mann	Recurring role, 8 episodes
2006	The Book of Daniel	Judith Webster	8 episodes
2006	CSI: Crime Scene Investigation	Janice Cooper	Episode: "Killer"
2006	Without a Trace	Cynthia Neuwirth	Episode: "Win Today"
2009	Kings	Queen Rose Benjamin	13 episodes
2010	Cold Case	Diane Yates	3 episodes
2012–20	Arrow	Moira Queen	Main role (Seasons 1-2); Voice (Season 3); Special guest (Seasons 5 & 8)
2016–18	Timeless	Carol Preston	12 episodes
2017	Legends of Tomorrow	Earth-X Gideon	Episode: "Crisis on Earth-X, Part 4" (voice, uncredited)
2023	Truth Be Told	Sybil Hackman	5 episodes
