= Terry Farrell (actress) =

American actress and model (born 1963)

- Farrell at GalaxyCon Des Moines in 2026
- Born: Theresa Farrell; November 19, 1963 (age 62); Cedar Rapids, Iowa, U.S.
- Occupations: Actress, model
- Years active: 1983–2003, 2017–present
- Spouses: Brian Baker (m. 2002; div. 2015); Adam Nimoy (m. 2018, divorced)
- Children: 1

Theresa Farrell (born November 19, 1963) is an American actress and fashion model. She is best known for her roles as Jadzia Dax in the television series Star Trek: Deep Space Nine and as Regina "Reggie" Kostas in the comedy series Becker.

== Early life and career ==
Farrell was born in Cedar Rapids, Iowa.

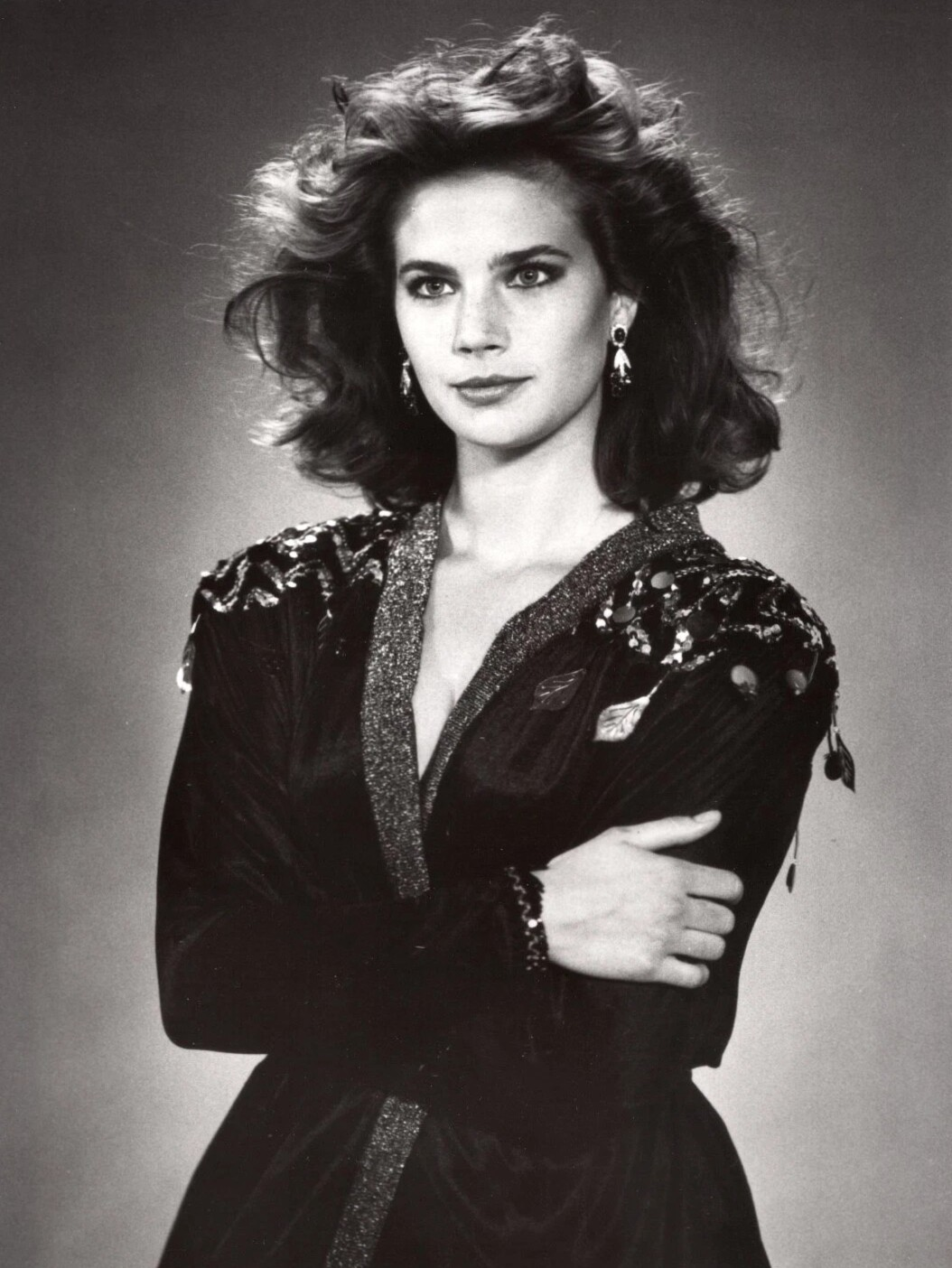
Farrell as Laurie Caswell on Paper Dolls in 1984

Farrell started her career in modeling, and studied acting while still modeling on the side. Her first major roles were in the short-lived 1984 television series Paper Dolls, playing a model, and in the feature film Back to School (her film debut), playing the love interest of Keith Gordon’s character. In 1986, Farrell appeared in an episode of The Twilight Zone.

In 1989, she began studying acting with Stella Adler and appeared in a number of guest-starring roles in television series, including Quantum Leap and The Cosby Show. In 1992, she played Cat in a second pilot for a U.S. version of Red Dwarf, which was not picked up.

Soon after failure of the Red Dwarf USA project, she was cast in a lead role in Star Trek: Deep Space Nine. Farrell portrayed Jadzia Dax, the space station's Starfleet science officer, a character from an alien species known as the Trill, who is the host to a 300-year-old symbiont, and can draw upon the memories and knowledge of the symbiont's seven previous hosts. The series debuted in January 1993, Farrell left the show at the end of the sixth season.

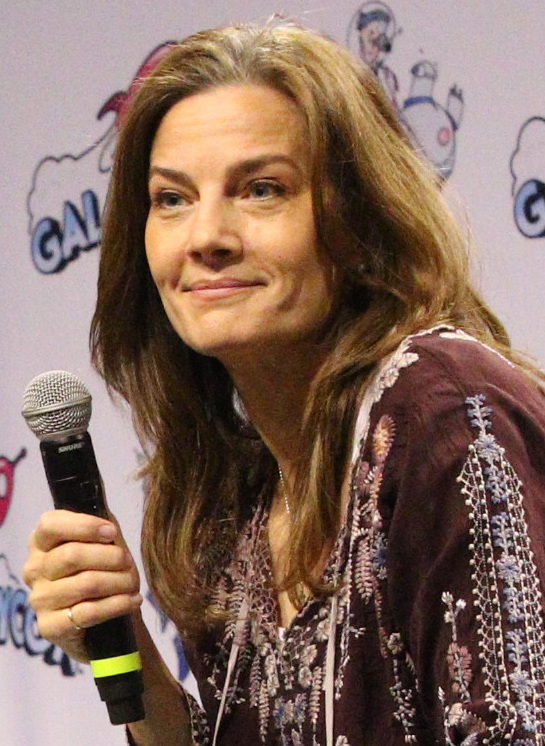
Farrell at GalaxyCon in 2019

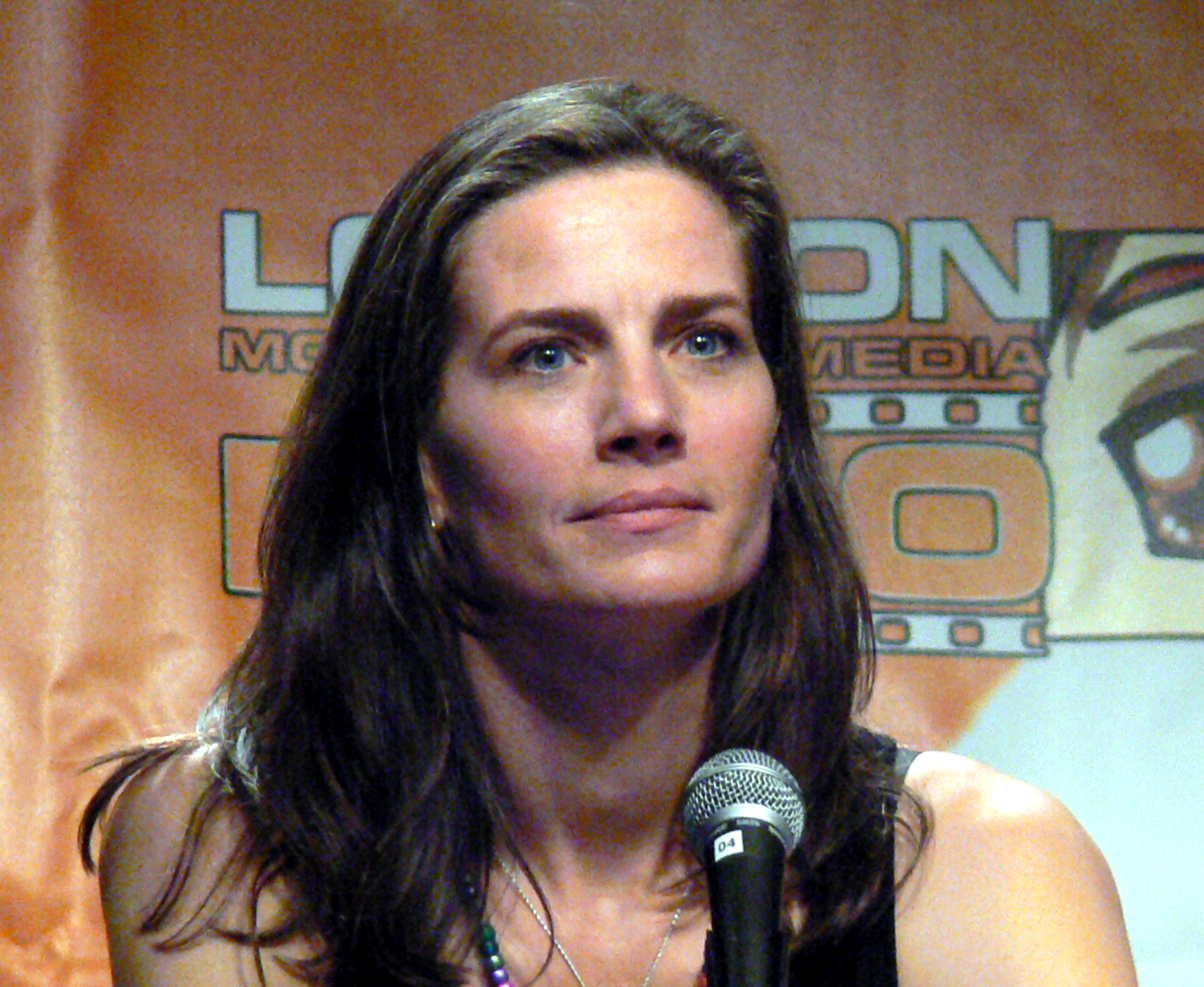
Terry Farrell in 2009

Farrell's next regular role was on Paramount's television comedy series Becker. She played Regina "Reggie" Kostas, foil and love interest to Ted Danson's John Becker, for four years and 94 episodes. Her character was written out of the show before the fifth season. Farrell told the Tampa Bay Times that she was fired from the show just after the fourth season's cliffhanger finale aired. Farrell stated that she was surprised by her dismissal from the series.

Farrell also provided the voice of Six of One in the animated short film Tripping the Rift, which eventually became a Sci-Fi Channel series in which Farrell did not reprise her role. First released independently on the Internet, Tripping the Rift originally featured Patricia Beckmann as the voice of Six; Beckmann's voice was replaced by Farrell's for an episode of the Sci-Fi Channel's short film series Exposure, in which Farrell was guest host.

In 2015, Farrell played a role in the web-released fan film Star Trek: Renegades.

== Personal life ==
Farrell largely retired from acting in 2002 after marrying actor Brian Baker, wishing to concentrate on her family. Farrell and Baker lived in Hershey, Pennsylvania, with their son. She enjoys sewing and yoga. Farrell appeared with Baker at the Hershey Area Playhouse in Hershey, in a production of A.R. Gurney's Love Letters. Farrell and Baker have been divorced since December 2015.

In August 2015, she began a relationship with Adam Nimoy, the son of Star Trek actor Leonard Nimoy. Farrell later confirmed on Twitter that they were engaged. Farrell and Nimoy were married in San Francisco on March 26, 2018. Farrell filed for divorce two years later and, in a 2024 interview, Nimoy called the marriage "brief," and confirmed that it had ended.

Farrell and her Star Trek: Deep Space Nine co-star Nana Visitor were honored in 2001 when William Kwong Yu Yeung named two small Solar System bodies he had discovered after them – asteroid 26734 Terryfarrell and asteroid 26733 Nanavisitor.

== Filmography ==
=== Film ===
Year	Title	Role	Notes
1986	Back to School	Valerie Desmond	
1987	Off the Mark / Crazy Legs	Jenell Johnson	
1992	Hellraiser III: Hell on Earth	Joanne "Joey" Summerskill	
1994	Red Sun Rising	Det. Karen Ryder	
1998	Reasons of the Heart	Maggie Livingston	
2000	Deep Core	Allison Saunders	
2000	Tripping the Rift	Six of One	Short film
2002	Psychic Murders	Macy	Video

=== Television ===
Year	Title	Role	Notes
1984	Paper Dolls	Laurie Caswell	Main role (13 episodes)
1984	Spencer	Sally	Episode: "The World's Worst Date"
1985	The Cosby Show	Nicki Phillips	Episode: "The Younger Woman"
1986	Beverly Hills Madam	Julie Tyler	TV film
1986	The Deliberate Stranger	Katie Hargreaves	TV film
1986	The Twilight Zone	Marsha Cole	Episode: "The After Hours"
1986	Family Ties	Liz Obeck	Episode 100: "The Big Fix"
1991	Mimi & Me	Mimi Molloy	TV film
1992	Quantum Leap	Lt. Lisa Sherman	Episode: "A leap for Lisa"
1992	Grapevine	Laurie	Episode: "The Allison and Ken story"
1992	Red Dwarf USA	Cat	Unaired Pilots
1993	Danielle Steel's Star	Elizabeth	Unaired Pilots
1993–1998	Star Trek: Deep Space Nine	Jadzia Dax	Main role; seasons 1-6
1998	Legion	Major Agatha Doyle	TV film
1998–2002	Becker	Regina "Reggie" Kostas	Main role (94 episodes)
2000	One True Love	Dana Boyer	TV film
2002	Crossing the Line	Laura Mosbach	TV film
2002	Gleason	Marilyn Taylor	TV film
2003	Code 11-14	Michelle Novack	TV film
2017	Renegades	Jada	2 episodes

=== Video games ===
Year	Title	Role
1996	Star Trek: Deep Space Nine: Harbinger	Lt. Cmdr. Jadzia Dax (voice)
1996	Treasure Quest	Spiritual Guide (voice)
2000	Star Trek: Deep Space Nine: The Fallen	Lt. Cmdr. Jadzia Dax (voice)
2024	Elsie	Dr. Grey (voice)
