= List of Star Trek characters (G–M) =

This article lists characters of Star Trek that received attention from third-party sources in their various canonical incarnations. This includes fictional major characters and fictional minor characters created for Star Trek, fictional characters not originally created for Star Trek, and real-life persons appearing in a fictional manner, such as holodeck recreations.

== Characters from all series, listed alphabetically ==
=== Key ===
Abbreviation	Title	Date(s)	Medium
TC	"The Cage" (Star Trek: The Original Series)	1966	TV
TOS	Star Trek: The Original Series	1966–1969	TV
TAS	Star Trek: The Animated Series	1973–1974	TV
TMP	Star Trek: The Motion Picture	1979	film
TWOK	Star Trek II: The Wrath of Khan	1982	film
TSFS	Star Trek III: The Search for Spock	1984	film
TVH	Star Trek IV: The Voyage Home	1986	film
TFF	Star Trek V: The Final Frontier	1989	film
TUC	Star Trek VI: The Undiscovered Country	1991	film
TNG	Star Trek: The Next Generation	1987–1994	TV
DS9	Star Trek: Deep Space Nine	1993–1999	TV
GEN	Star Trek Generations	1994	film
VOY	Star Trek: Voyager	1995–2001	TV
FC	Star Trek: First Contact	1996	film
INS	Star Trek: Insurrection	1998	film
NEM	Star Trek: Nemesis	2002	film
ENT	Star Trek: Enterprise	2001–2005	TV
ST09	Star Trek (2009)	2009	film
STID	Star Trek Into Darkness	2013	film
STB	Star Trek Beyond	2016	film
DSC	Star Trek: Discovery	2017–2024	TV
SHO	Star Trek: Short Treks	2018–2020	TV
PIC	Star Trek: Picard	2020–2023	TV
LOW	Star Trek: Lower Decks	2020–2024	TV
PRO	Star Trek: Prodigy	2021–2024	TV
SNW	Star Trek: Strange New Worlds	2022–present	TV
S31	Star Trek: Section 31	2025	film
SFA	Star Trek: Starfleet Academy	2026–present	TV

Bajoran characters are listed by family name, which is stated first.

Joined Trills are listed by the name of the symbiont, which replaces the family name.

=== G ===
Character	Actor	Appearances	Description
Elim Garak	Andrew J. Robinson	Past Prologue (DS9) recurring thereafter	Cardassian male, former member of the Cardassian intelligence organization Obsidian Order, who fell from grace and was exiled to Deep Space Nine, where he worked in his own tailor shop. Son of Enabran Tain, former head of the Obsidian Order, and archenemy of Gul Dukat.
Rachel Garrett	Tricia O'Neil; Kacey Rohl	Yesterday's Enterprise (TNG), S31	Human female captain of the Enterprise-C, which traveled unintentionally through a time portal. Garrett decided to return the ship to her own timeline, which resulted in her death though brought about peace. A younger version of Garrett is a Starfleet liaison to the Section 31 organization.
Sonya Gomez	Lycia Naff	Q Who, Samaritan Snare (TNG), First First Contact (LD)	A human ensign serving under Geordi La Forge on the Enterprise-D. While she initially struggles due to her inexperience, La Forge mentors her and helps her build self-confidence. Years later, she becomes captain of the Archimedes. The character was originally written as a potential love interest for La Forge.
Phillip Green	Phillip Pine	The Savage Curtain (TOS) Demons (ENT)	In TOS: Human warlord and despot of the 21st century, notorious for striking at his enemies while negotiating with them. An Excalbian image of him, part of an experiment to study the human concepts of good and evil, led the four-being team which represented evil. In Enterprise, Colonel Green is shown in a historical video used by the group Terra Prime to justify their existence.
Amanda Grayson	Jane Wyatt; Majel Barrett (Voice); Cynthia Blaise; Winona Ryder; Mia Kirshner	Journey to Babel (TOS), Yesteryear (TAS), TVH, TFF, ST09, Lethe, Will You Take My Hand?, Brother (DSC); Charades (SNW)	Spock's human mother, married to Sarek. In one timeline, she dies between the events in Star Trek IV: The Voyage Home and the Star Trek: The Next Generation episode "Sarek". In the alternate timeline depicted in the 2009 Star Trek movie, she dies when Vulcan is destroyed. Grayson was first portrayed by Jane Wyatt, who appears in both "Journey to Babel" and The Voyage Home. Majel Barrett provided the voice of Amanda in the animated Star Trek series. Cynthia Blaise played her in Star Trek V: The Final Frontier. In the 2009 film Star Trek, the role of Amanda Grayson was played by Winona Ryder. Mia Kirshner played Amanda on the prequel series Star Trek: Discovery and Star Trek: Strange New Worlds.
Guinan	Whoopi Goldberg; Isis J. Jones; Ito Aghayere	The Child (TNG), recurring thereafter GEN; NEM; PIC (season 2)	Enigmatic female El-Aurian Bartender of the Ten Forward Lounge on the Enterprise-D, whose wise counsel proved invaluable many times. She shares a close bond with Captain Picard (a relationship "beyond friendship, beyond family").

=== H ===
Character	Actor	Appearances	Description
Hugh	Jonathan Del Arco	I, Borg, Descent, Descent, Part II (TNG), The End is the Beginning, The Impossible Box, Nepenthe (PIC)	First human drone to be de-assimilated by the Federation. After reestablishing his individualism on the Enterprise D, he was later returned by his choice to the Borg. Hugh unintentionally disrupted Borg systems and was left stranded. He was found by Lore, Data's brother, and kept under his control. He was found by Captain Picard and again was freed. Hugh was last working on the partially destroyed Borg cube under control of the Romulans. There, he worked to de-assimilate any that still could be saved. Hugh was killed there protecting his friends by a Romulan agent named Narissa.

=== I ===
Character	Actor	Appearances	Description
Ihat	None	Masks (TNG)	A masculine personality associated with a ceremonial neckplate with a wings-like design. Data assumes the personality of Ihat multiple times.
Ilia	Persis Khambatta	TMP	A female native of Delta IV, she was once involved in a romantic relationship with Willard Decker. As a Starfleet lieutenant, she was assigned to the Enterprise as navigator during the V'ger crisis. She was killed on the Bridge by one of V'ger's probes, but her appearance was later given to another V'ger probe, which was put aboard the Enterprise and assigned to learn about the human "infestation". However, this "Ilia probe" was constructed so perfectly by V'ger that it even contained the real Ilia's memories, which were deeply suppressed. Decker, however, was able to access those memories and establish a personal rapport with the probe. Later, when he learned that V'ger needed a "human element" to reveal its data – and, in so doing, stop its attack on Earth – he input the final code sequence manually, and, together with the Ilia probe, merged with V'ger. Ilia was later listed as "missing" in action.

=== J ===
Character	Actor	Appearances	Description
Kathryn Janeway	Kate Mulgrew	Caretaker (VOY) recurring thereafter, NEM, PRO	Captain of the USS Voyager during its seven years in the Delta Quadrant. Appeared briefly as Admiral Janeway in NEM and regularly as both a hologram and the human Admiral in Star Trek: Prodigy.

=== K ===
Character	Actor	Appearances	Description
Kahless	Robert Herron; Kevin Conway	The Savage Curtain (TOS), Rightful Heir (TNG)	Legendary Klingon warrior and first emperor of the Klingon Empire; also known as "the Unforgettable" among his people. A clone created in 2369 was made ceremonial emperor by Gowron.
Lenara Kahn	Susanna Thompson	Rejoined (DS9)	Trill woman hosting the Kahn symbiont, which, as Nilani Kahn in a former life, was married to Torias Dax.
Verad Kalon	John Glover	Invasive Procedures (DS9)	Verad Kalon was an unjoined Trill and failed host candidate who briefly stole the Dax symbiont from Jadzia Dax in 2370.
Kamala	Famke Janssen	The Perfect Mate (TNG)	An empathic metamorph from Krios Prime. Since her birth, she was intended to be Valtese Chancellor Alrik's Kriosian peace bride in an effort to reunite the two planets.
Kang	Michael Ansara	Day of the Dove (TOS), Blood Oath (DS9), Flashback (VOY)	Legendary Klingon warrior and Dahar Master whose exploits assured him a place in the Hall of Heroes, as told in G'Trok's poem "The Fall of Kang", an epic so important it is required reading at Starfleet Academy. Commander Kang once faced James Kirk in 2269, but later joined him to defeat their true enemy, an energy life form living off their shared hatred when trapped aboard the Enterprise as undying fodder. Captain Kang later squared off against Captain Sulu's USS Excelsior during the tensions preceding the Khitomer Conference in 2293. Kang had already met Curzon Dax by then on the Klingon colony Korvat, when Dax intentionally angered Kang to foster a bond—a calculated risk as he walked out during a long diatribe by the shocked Klingon. The Trill envoy became such a trusted family friend that Kang's firstborn, a boy, was made his godson and named "Dax" in his honor. The boy was among those later killed in revenge by the marauding Albino and fostered a blood oath of revenge in turn among Kor, Koloth, and Dax that was finally carried out in 2370 and led to Dahar Master Kang's death as he struck the death blow on his enemy. He also had defeated T'nag and his army with only colleagues Kor and Koloth, according to Kor's tale in 2372, and later feasted on the leader's heart.
Rayna Kapec	Louise Sorel	Requiem for Methuselah (TOS)	Android created in the perfect likeness of a young human woman
Kargan	Christopher Collins	A Matter of Honor (TNG)	Klingon captain of the IKS Pagh in 2365. He was short, heavyset, and demanded strict adherence to his authority. When he learned of the space organism eating away at a small section of the Pagh's hull, and that the Enterprise-D had directed an intense scanning beam at that specific area for two minutes, Kargan believed the Federation starship had landed a first strike against his vessel, so he vowed to attack and destroy the Enterprise-D. He suspected that Commander William Riker, his acting first officer, was complicit in the Enterprise-D's attack, so, to test his loyalty, Kargan demanded to know the surest method of attack against the Federation starship. When Riker refused to break his oath to Starfleet, Kargan relented, knowing at least that Riker wasn't a traitor or a coward. When Riker activated an emergency transponder given to him by Worf, Kargan, believing it was a weapon, demanded that Riker give it to him. Kargan was then beamed aboard the Enterprise-D, and Riker was able to assume command of the Pagh and defuse the brewing battle. Later, when Kargan was returned to the Pagh, Riker refused to resume his station, so Kargan slugged him and ordered him removed from the ship. That action allowed Kargan to save face and regain honor in the eyes of his officers, and likely averted an assassination attempt by Lieutenant Klag.
Anton Karidian	Arnold Moss	The Conscience of the King (TOS)	A Shakespearian actor (and father of Lenore Karidian) once known as Kodos the Executioner, Governor of Tarsus IV
Lenore Karidian	Barbara Anderson	The Conscience of the King (TOS)	A Shakespearian actor (and daughter of Anton Karidian).
Karina	Annette Helde	Visionary (DS9)	Romulan officer who, in 2371, was part of a delegation to Starbase Deep Space Nine to study Starfleet Intelligence reports on the Dominion. The Romulans regarded the Dominion as the greatest threat to the Alpha Quadrant, and intended to destroy Deep Space Nine before collapsing the Bajoran Wormhole to prevent any Dominion incursion from the Gamma Quadrant.
Walker Keel	Jonathan Farwell	Conspiracy (TNG)	Starfleet captain and commanding officer of the USS Horatio who warned Picard about an alien invasion.
Edith Keeler	Joan Collins	The City on the Edge of Forever (TOS)	In 1930, during the Great Depression, Keeler was a social worker who died in a traffic accident. Centuries later, during a survey of the Guardian of Forever by the USS Enterprise, the ship's Chief Medical Officer, Dr. Leonard McCoy, during a temporary bout of insanity brought on by an accidental injection of cordrazine, escaped into Earth's past. While there, he saved Keeler's life, which sparked a chain of events throughout the timeline, essentially changing history. In the altered timeline, Keeler, a passionate believer in peace, founded a movement which delayed the entry of the United States into World War II, thus paving the way for an Axis victory. Subsequently, Starfleet, the Federation, and the USS Enterprise were gone, but the proximity to the Guardian of Forever by the landing party allowed Captain James T. Kirk and First Officer Spock to follow McCoy into the past. Kirk and Spock were able to prevent McCoy from saving Keeler's life, thus restoring the timeline. These events were particularly stressful for Kirk, as he had fallen in love with Keeler.
Keenser	Deep Roy	ST09; STID; STB	In 2258, in the alternate reality, Keenser worked with Montgomery Scott at an automated Federation outpost on Delta Vega. He was Scott's only company for months before Spock and James T. Kirk arrived. After the Enterprise successfully defeated Nero and the Romulan mining vessel Narada, Keenser joined the Enterprise crew as an engineer under Scott.
Keevan	Christopher Shea	Rocks and Shoals, The Magnificent Ferengi (DS9)	A Vorta field commander who sacrificed his Jem'Hadar troops to save his own life. He was later killed by Gaila when Quark and his team tried to trade him back to the Dominion for Quark's mother.
K'Ehleyr	Suzie Plakson	The Emissary (TNG), Reunion (TNG)	Half-Klingon, half-human. Worf's mate and Alexander Rozhenko's mother. Killed by Duras.
Keldar	None	The House of Quark (DS9)	A Ferengi, deceased husband of Ishka and father of Quark and Rom. (Only discussed, never seen.)
Kell	Larry Dobkin	The Mind's Eye (TNG)	Klingon ambassador who accompanied the Enterprise-D to the planet Krios in 2367 to investigate Klingon Governor Vagh's claim that Starfleet was supplying weapons to Kriosian rebels. Kell was colluding with the Romulans to disrupt the alliance between the Federation and the Klingon Empire. The Romulans had "conditioned" Geordi La Forge to receive E-band transmissions through his VISOR. Kell carried the transmitter that instructed La Forge to kill Governor Vagh, but the attempt failed. Kell was taken into custody by Vagh.
Captain Keogh	Alan Oppenheimer	The Jem'Hadar (DS9)	Commanding officer of the ill-fated USS Odyssey.
Kes	Jennifer Lien	Caretaker (VOY), recurring thereafter	Ocampa woman, partner of Neelix who joins the USS Voyager crew for several years before evolving into a different state and so being forced to leave.
Kessick	Richard Lineback	The Xindi (ENT)	Xindi Primate, slave in a Trellium-D mine
Harry Kim	Garrett Wang	Caretaker (VOY), recurring thereafter	Ensign and operations officer aboard the USS Voyager during its seven years in the Delta Quadrant. Despite his rank of ensign, he sits on the senior staff meetings and occasionally takes over command for "night" shifts.
Kira Meru	Leslie Hope	Wrongs Darker Than Death or Night (DS9)	Mother of Kira Nerys and was a comfort woman for Gul Dukat for seven years.
Kira Nerys	Nana Visitor; Unknown child actress	Emissary (DS9), recurring thereafter	Former resistance fighter against Cardassian occupation, a Bajoran Militia officer (Major, later Colonel) assigned as Benjamin Sisko's first officer on the starbase Deep Space Nine. She has a Starfleet field commission of Commander when she serves as advisor for Damar's rebellion against the Dominion. At the end of the series, she takes over command of Deep Space Nine.
Kira Pohl		Wrongs Darker Than Death or Night (DS9)	Brother of Kira Nerys
Kira Reon		Wrongs Darker Than Death or Night (DS9)	Brother of Kira Nerys
Kira Taban	Thomas Kopache	Wrongs Darker Than Death or Night, Ties of Blood and Water (DS9)	Father of Kira Nerys
Aurelan Kirk	Joan Swift	Operation -- Annihilate! (TOS)	Wife of George Samuel Kirk, Jr., mother of Peter Kirk, sister-in-law of James T. Kirk
George Samuel Kirk, Jr.	William Shatner (TOS); Dan Jeannotte (SNW)	Operation -- Annihilate! (TOS)	Brother of James T. Kirk. James usually referred to his brother by his middle name, "Sam".
George Samuel Kirk, Sr.	Chris Hemsworth	ST09	Father of James T. Kirk and George Samuel Kirk, Jr. Served as first officer on the Starfleet vessel USS Kelvin.
James T. Kirk	William Shatner (TOS); Chris Pine (ST09, STID, STB); Paul Wesley (SNW)	TOS, TAS, TMP, WOK, SFS, TVH, TFF, TUC, GEN, ST09, STID, STB	Captain of the USS Enterprise (NCC-1701 and NCC-1701-A), major character in the original and first animated Star Trek series and ten Star Trek movies. In GEN Kirk is presumed dead; in fact he has been in the Nexus for 75 years when he is discovered by Jean-Luc Picard; at the end Kirk helps save the universe at the cost of his own life at the age of 137 years; a running gag in the film series is that although Kirk has many love affairs with women, he has only one child: his son David Marcus from an affair with Dr. Carol Marcus.
Peter Kirk	Craig Hundley	Operation -- Annihilate! (TOS)	Son of George Samuel, Jr. and Aurelan Kirk, nephew of James T. Kirk
Winona Kirk	Jennifer Morrison	ST09	James T. Kirk's mother
K'Kath	Chad Haywood	Real Life (VOY)	Klingon friend of Jeffrey in the holographic family program modified by Torres.
Klaa	Todd Bryant	TFF	Young Klingon captain of a Bird-of-Prey. He is also the gunner, as the tactical scope is mounted above his command chair and lowers like a periscope when he wants to fire the ship's disruptors. He is bored with shooting space garbage, such as Earth's Pioneer 10 probe, and longs for a bigger challenge to make a name for himself. When he learns that the Enterprise-A and Captain James T. Kirk are headed to Nimbus III, he arranges to intercept them. Klaa shoots at but misses the Enterprise, which suddenly engages warp speed. He follows her to Sha Ka Ree and this time scores a hit. He orders the Enterprise to surrender, but General Korrd calls him off and forces him to rescue Kirk from the surface of Sha Ka Ree. At a "cocktail party" aboard the Enterprise, he salutes Kirk as a fellow warrior. One of Klaa's more memorable features, besides his muscles, is his wild "shock rock" hair. Noncanon: In the movie novelization, Klaa's Bird-of-Prey is called Okrona.
Klag	Brian Thompson	A Matter of Honor (TNG)	Klingon lieutenant and second officer of IKS Pagh in 2365. He challenged Commander William Riker's authority over him as first officer of Pagh during an officer-exchange program. After Riker demonstrated his authority over him, Klag agreed to take his orders and even respected the commander for his strength. Klag's father had once been captured in battle by Romulans, but not allowed to die. He eventually escaped, and now lives on Qo'noS, honorless, waiting for death by natural causes. For that reason, Klag refuses to see him. When Captain Kargan suspected that Riker was complicit in Enterprise-D's "attack" on Pagh, Klag disagreed and defended the commander.
Klingon Amar Captain	Mark Lenard	TMP	He commanded three K't'inga-class battle cruisers in an attack against V'ger in Quad L-14. His flagship, the Imperial Klingon Cruiser Amar, was the last to be destroyed.
Klingon Captain	K.L. Smith	Elaan of Troyius (TOS)	He commanded the Klingon warship that stalked the Enterprise through the Tellun Star System. After Kryton had sabotaged the Enterprise's warp engines, the Klingon demanded that Kirk surrender unconditionally and immediately.
K'mpec	Charles Cooper	Sins of the Father, Reunion (TNG)	Klingon chancellor and supreme commander who oversaw Worf's discommendation. Later poisoned by Duras and succeeded by Gowron. In his time, K'mpec served as leader of the Klingon Empire longer than anyone previously.
K'mtar	James Sloyan	Firstborn (TNG)	The adult Alexander Rozhenko from a possible future.
K'nera	David Froman	Heart of Glory (TNG)	Klingon commander of a K't'inga-class battle cruiser that was patrolling the area of the Romulan Neutral Zone in 2364, seeking the whereabouts of the IKS T'Acog. When he learned that the criminals Korris, Konmel, and Kunivas had been rescued by the Enterprise-D, he plotted an intercept course and demanded that Captain Jean-Luc Picard turn them over when he arrived. By that time, however, all three Klingons had died from injuries or were killed during their escape attempt.
Kodos	Arnold Moss	The Conscience of the King (TOS)	Governor of Tarsus IV, also known as "the Executioner", who engaged in a large-scale eugenics program to counter the impending threat of starvation to the colony; later assumed the role of actor Anton Karidian leading a traveling Shakespeare company called the "Karidian Players".
Kohlar	Wren T. Brown	Prophecy (VOY)	Klingon commander of a generational starship of the D7 class, leader of a group of Klingons who were searching for the kuva'magh, or "savior" of Klingon culture. Kohlar and his followers are found to be infected with the Klingon nehret retrovirus disease by Voyager's holographic Doctor, which is cured with DNA from B'Elanna Torres's unborn daughter Miral Paris.
Kol	J.R. Quinonez; Leslie Jordan	The Price (TNG), False Profits (VOY)	One of two Ferengi stranded in the Delta Quadrant after attempting to secure the Barzan wormhole for themselves. Crash-landing on the Takaran homeworld, they insinuated themselves to be the Holy Sages prophesied by the Takaran "Song of the Sages" to exploit the Takarans for profit.
Kolopak	Henry Darrow	Tattoo (VOY), Basics, Part 1 (VOY)	Father of Chakotay
Koloth	William Campbell; James Doohan (Voice)	The Trouble with Tribbles (TOS), More Tribbles, More Troubles (TAS), Blood Oath (DS9)	Klingon captain who faced Kirk twice over tribbles; later, as Dahar Master, he swore a blood oath with Kor, Kang and Curzon Dax to kill the Albino. Koloth was killed during the assault on the Albino's fortress. James Doohan voiced the character in the animated episode.
Sirna Kolrami	Roy Brocksmith	Peak Performance (TNG)	Zakdorn master strategist and consultant for war games between the Enterprise-D and the USS Hathaway. Master in the game of Strategema.
Komack	Byron Morrow	Amok Time (TOS)	Starfleet admiral who orders Captain Kirk to Altair VI rather than Vulcan until pressured by T'Pau
Anastasia Komononov	Nana Visitor	Our Man Bashir (DS9)	A Russian KGB colonel in Bashir's secret agent program. Due to a transporter malfunction, Komononov's physical parameters were temporarily modelled on Kira.
Konmel	Charles H. Hyman	Heart of Glory (TNG)	Klingon lieutenant who, with Korris and Kunivas, left the Klingon Defense Force to pursue a life in which he could live like a "true Klingon". In 2364, the trio stole the Talarian freighter Batris and subsequently destroyed the IKS T'Acog, which had been sent to retrieve them. After being rescued by the Enterprise-D, Korris and Konmel lied to Captain Jean-Luc Picard about the battle, but later revealed their true intentions to Lieutenant (j.g.) Worf. By then, Klingon commander K'near had apprised Picard of the Klingons' criminal status, so Picard detained them in the brig. They escaped, but Konmel was killed in a firefight with Enterprise-D security. To his credit, though, it took three phaser shots to bring him down.
Konsab	None	Face of the Enemy (TNG)	Romulan commander and former instructor of military history at the Romulan Intelligence Academy. His main theme consisted of theories on the differences between the military and the Tal Shiar. He believed that military officers must trust one another to function. (The dialogue was unclear, but Konsab may have been Commander Toreth's father. She described him as an "idealistic old man" and a "devoted citizen who only tried to speak his mind". The Tal Shiar dragged him from his home in the middle of the night, and Toreth never saw him again.)
Kor	John Colicos; James Doohan (Voice); Demore Barnes (SNW)	Errand of Mercy (TOS), The Time Trap (TAS), Blood Oath, The Sword of Kahless, Once More unto the Breach (DS9), A Case of Chiaroscuro (SNW)	The first named Klingon to appear in Star Trek, as an antagonist to Kirk. Commander Kor briefly ruled the planet Organia as its military governor, after serving in the occupation of the Mat'aar system. A few years later, Captain Kor's ship, the IKS Klothos, was lost in the Delta Triangle, but later escaped with help from the Enterprise. John Colicos reprised the role in three Deep Space Nine episodes, as an ally and friend of Jadzia and Ezri Dax. Dahar Master Kor was killed in glorious battle by acting as a decoy to hold off the Jem'Hadar while the rest of the Klingon fleet escapes ("Once More Unto the Breach"). James Doohan voiced the character in the animated episode. In March 2019, SyFy rated Kor as the 3rd greatest Klingon of the Star Trek franchise, behind only Worf and Martok.
Korax	Michael Pataki	The Trouble with Tribbles (TOS)	Klingon first officer of the IKS Gro'th under Captain Koloth. He instigates the bar fight on Deep Space Station K-7 by taunting Montgomery Scott, first calling Captain Kirk a "tin-plated dictator with delusions of godhood", then calling the Enterprise a "sagging old rust bucket that's designed like a garbage scow". However, when he says that the Enterprise should be hauled away as garbage, Scotty throws the first punch.
Roger Korby	Michael Strong	What Are Little Girls Made Of? (TOS)	Deceased fiancé of Enterprise nurse Christine Chapel whose android replica contended with Captain Kirk on Exo III.
Korgano	None	Masks (TNG)	A masculine personality associated with Korgano's moon symbol and Korgano's silver mask. Captain Picard wears Korgano's mask and poses as Korgano to confront Masaka.
Kruge	Christopher Lloyd	Star Trek III: The Search For Spock	Klingon commanding officer who destroyed the USS Grissom, ordered David Marcus killed, and battled with and was killed by Kirk on the Genesis planet.
Jake Kurland	Stephen Gregory	Coming of Age (TNG)	Male Human civilian who became somewhat depressed about not getting the chance to take the final Starfleet Academy entrance exam on Relva VII in 2364. He stole the Type 7 shuttlecraft Copernicus and would have crushed on Relva VII, if Captain Picard had not directed him to perform a specific flight maneuver.
Kurn	Tony Todd	Sins of the Father (TNG) recurring thereafter, Sons of Mogh (DS9)	Younger brother of Worf and also a son of Mogh who was not on Khitomer when the Klingon colony was destroyed by the Romulans. Years later, as a member of the Klingon Defense Force, Commander Kurn participated in an officer-exchange program with Starfleet that landed him aboard the USS Enterprise-D and reunited him with Worf ("Sins of the Father"). More than a year later, Captain Kurn commands his own K'Vort-class bird-of-prey and sides with Gowron during the Klingon Civil War ("Redemption II"). More than four years later, a ruined Kurn appears on starbase Deep Space Nine ("The Sons of Mogh") and asks Worf to kill him to restore his honor, which, along with his seat on the Klingon High Council and the House of Mogh's most valuable possessions, were stripped from him because Worf fought against Gowron during the chancellor's takeover of Cardassia Prime ("The Way of the Warrior").

=== L ===
Character	Actor	Appearances	Description
Edward La Forge	Ben Vereen	Interface (TNG)	Starfleet commander and father of Geordi La Forge. He is a Ph.D. exozoologist.
Geordi La Forge	LeVar Burton	Encounter at Farpoint (TNG) recurring thereafter, Timeless (VOY), GEN, FCT, INS, NEM, The Bounty (PIC) recurring thereafter	Chief engineer of the Enterprise-D and -E, lead curator of the Starfleet Museum in 2401, captain of the Galaxy-class USS Challenger in an alternate future
Silva La Forge	Madge Sinclair	Interface (TNG)	Starfleet captain and mother of Geordi La Forge. She commanded the USS Hera (NCC-62006), which disappeared without a trace. The life forms of Moriginy VII use her appearance to communicate with Geordi, who helps return them to the atmosphere where they live.
Lal	Hallie Todd	The Offspring (TNG)	Daughter of Data
Natima Lang	Mary Crosby	Profit and Loss (DS9)	Cardassian radical, the love of Quark's life
Larg (Captain)	Michael G. Hagerty	Redemption II (TNG)	Klingon captain who supports the House of Duras's claim to the chancellorship during the Klingon Civil War of 2367–2368. Although he and Captain Kurn fight on opposite sides, they drink together in the First City on Qo'noS after battle.
Larg (Hologram)	Stephen Ralston	Real Life (VOY)	Klingon friend of Jeffrey in the holographic family program modified by Torres.
Sam Lavelle	Dan Gauthier	Lower Decks (TNG)	Ensign and flight controller aboard the Enterprise-D. He is Canadian by heritage. He tests for the operations manager (ops) position on the Bridge, but believes that his friend, Ensign Sito Jaxa, is more qualified. After Sito is suddenly killed during a secret mission, Lavelle is promoted to lieutenant junior grade and wins the assignment to ops.
Lazarus	Robert Brown	The Alternative Factor (TOS)	Lazarus-A was a Time traveling scientist who went insane when he found out his parallel universe counterpart Lazarus-B had found a way to go between two universes (One positive matter and one anti-matter). While Lazarus in the Positive Universe kept changing from Lazarus-A (Insane) to Lazarus-B (sane) the only place Both versions of Lazarus could meet together at the same time was within a negative magnetic Warp corridor between both universes (if they ever meet each other outside the magnetic Corridor within either universe both the meeting of the Positive matter and Negative Anti-matter would result in the destruction of both universes). After Captain Kirk learns the truth from Lazarus-B about Lazarus-A plan [who is trying to reach the anti-matter universe], Captain Kirk threw Lazarus-A into his Timespaceship/doorway into the magnetic corridor and then had his time spaceship/doorway destroyed by the Enterprise phasers; this action saved both universes since it also destroyed Lazarus-B Timeship/doorway as well-leaving both Lazarus A and Lazarus B trapped fighting forever in the magnetic corridor.
Leeta	Chase Masterson	Explorers (DS9) recurring thereafter	Bajoran woman employed as a dabo girl in Quark's bar on DS9. She married Rom after a brief romance with Julian Bashir.
Robin Lefler	Ashley Judd	Darmok (TNG), The Game (TNG)	Ensign aboard the Enterprise-D (engineering section) and friend of Wesley Crusher. Major character in Star Trek: New Frontier spinoff novels and in fan film project Star Trek: Hidden Frontier
Elizabeth Lense	Bari Hochwald	Explorers (DS9)	Valedictorian in Julian Bashir's Starfleet Medical School class, assigned Chief Medical Officer of the USS Lexington.
Leskit	David Graf	Soldiers of the Empire (DS9)	A Klingon, pilot of the IKS Rotarran when General Martok assumes command.
Lt. Leslie	Eddie Paskey	Where No Man Has Gone Before (TOS) recurring thereafter	Lieutenant Leslie wears many hats aboard the Enterprise, from security officer to relief helmsman to manning the bridge engineering station. Although he was killed in the second-season episode "Obsession", he was apparently revived, and went on to appear in several subsequent episodes.
Janice Lester	Sandra Smith	Turnabout Intruder (TOS)	Former lover of Kirk, who temporarily swapped bodies with him.
Li Nalas	Richard Beymer	The Homecoming, The Circle, The Siege (DS9)	Bajoran resistance fighter who became a hero of mythological proportions after accidentally killing a Cardassian soldier
Abraham Lincoln	Lee Bergere	The Savage Curtain (TOS)	Alien creature faithfully masquerading as American president Abraham Lincoln
Linnis	Jessica Collins	Before and After (VOY)	Daughter of Tom Paris and Kes, and mother of Andrew, in an alternate timeline.
L'Naan	None	Prophecy (VOY)	A Klingon, daughter of Krelik, mother of Miral, grandmother of B'Elanna Torres
Nicholas Locarno	Robert Duncan McNeill	The First Duty (TNG), The Inner Fight, Old Friends, New Planets (LOW)	Classmate of Wesley Crusher and Beckett Mariner at Starfleet Academy, and former team leader of Nova Squadron. Expelled for attempting to cover up their attempt at a banned maneuver, which resulted in the death of a squad member. Locarno returns in Lower Decks season four as the leader of Nova Fleet, which consist of mutineers from various factions in the Alpha and Beta Quadrants.
Locutus	Patrick Stewart	The Best of Both Worlds Part 1 & 2 (TNG), Emissary (DS9), FCT	Drone within the Borg Collective made using the body of Captain Picard.
Logan	Vyto Ruginis	The Arsenal of Freedom (TNG)	Chief Engineer of the Enterprise-D, later succeeded by Geordi La Forge
Gabriel Lorca	Jason Isaacs	DSC	Captain of the USS Discovery, major character in Star Trek: Discovery.
Lore	Brent Spiner	Datalore (TNG) recurring thereafter	"Evil twin brother" of Lt. Commander Data.
Lori Ciana	Susan J. Sullivan	TMP	Starfleet officer who was killed during a transporter malfunction while beaming up to the Enterprise. Commander Sonak died in the same accident. In the TMP novelization by Gene Roddenberry, Ciana was a vice admiral and part of Commanding Admiral Nogura's inner staff. Her assignment was as xenopsychologist to nonhuman species in Starfleet Command, and she also served as Nogura's personal representative to the "new human" groups on Earth. She was a last-minute addition to the Enterprise crew, which needed an officer trained in her xenopsychiatric specialty. Her death was a terrific blow to James T. Kirk, with whom she had lived for one year after the Enterprise's five-year mission.
Loskene	Barbara Babcock (Voice)	The Tholian Web (TOS)	Tholian commander who catches the Enterprise "trespassing in a territorial annex of the Tholian Assembly", where the USS Defiant (NCC-1764) disappeared into an area of spatial interphase. Loskene agrees to wait for 1 hour and 53 minutes while the Enterprise effects rescue operations. However, when that time elapses, he attacks the Enterprise and later joins with another Tholian ship to create an "energy web" around the Enterprise.
Phillipa Louvois	Amanda McBroom	The Measure of a Man (TNG)	Starfleet captain and Judge Advocate General at Starbase 173. She prosecuted Captain Jean-Luc Picard after the loss of the Stargazer (NCC-2893).
Lovok	Leland Orser	The Die Is Cast (DS9)	A Founder disguised as a Romulan Tal Shiar colonel in 2371. He was in command of Enabran Tain's flagship Warbird. When the Obsidian Order and the Tal Shiar began their attack on the Founders' homeworld, Lovok gave Odo and Elim Garak access to their Runabout to escape, because "no changeling has ever harmed another". He offered Odo the chance to go with him and become one with the Great Link, but Odo declined. Lovok was beamed away by a Jem'Hadar transporter.
Lumba	Armin Shimerman	Profit and Lace (DS9)	Name of Quark's persona while pretending to be a Ferengi female
Lursa	Barbara March	Redemption, Part I (TNG) recurring thereafter, Past Prologue (DS9), GEN	One of the sisters of Duras. Time rated Lursa and B'Etor, second best villains of the Star Trek franchise in 2016.
Lutan	Jessie Lawrence Ferguson	Code of Honor (TNG)	Planetary ruler who became enamored of Tasha Yar

=== M ===
Character	Actor	Appearances	Description
M-113 Creature	Sandra Gimpel	The Man Trap (TOS)	A creature native to planet M-113 that feeds on salt and has the ability to project the appearance of anyone it wishes.
Bruce Maddox	Brian Brophy (TNG), John Ales (PIC)	The Measure of a Man (TNG), Stardust City Rag (PIC)	Starfleet commander and scientist who had opposed Data's entry into Starfleet on the grounds that Data "is not alive"; later tried and failed to have Data assigned to him for dis-assembly and research then started receiving self-evaluation reports from Data (cf. "Data's Day"). The backstory of Star Trek: Picard reveals that Maddox attempted to reconstruct Data's positronic brain, resulting in the creation of Dahj and Soji. Following the attack on Mars and subsequent banning of synthetics, Maddox disappeared, and by the time of the series his whereabouts are still unknown, until Raffi Musiker tracks him to a place called Freecloud. Once Maddox is retrieved, he tells Picard that he sent Dahj and Soji to find the true reason behind the ban on synthetics and is subsequently murdered by his own colleague, Dr. Agnes Jurati, who had overheard his conversation with Picard.
Madred	David Warner	Chain of Command (TNG)	Cardassian gul and torturer of a captured Captain Jean-Luc Picard
Mallora	Tucker Smallwood	The Xindi (ENT) recurring thereafter	Black Primate representative on the Xindi Council, friend of Degra; became an ally to the humans
Maltz	John Larroquette	SFS	Klingon officer who remains aboard his Bird-of-Prey while Commander Kruge beams down to the Genesis planet to wrest its secrets from Admiral Kirk. Maltz beams up the rest of the former Enterprise's crew while Kirk and Kruge fight to the death. Kirk, victorious, tricks Maltz into beaming him (and Spock) aboard before the Genesis planet destroys itself. Kirk enters the Bridge and takes Maltz prisoner at phaser-point, promising to "kill" him later for not piloting the Bird-of-Prey away from Genesis. Maltz may have been Kruge's tactical officer, as he counted down the kellicams before the Bird-of-Prey came within firing range of the Enterprise.
Mara	Susan Howard	Day of the Dove (TOS)	Klingon science officer and wife of Kang. She is evacuated from his wrecked ship to the Enterprise and fears for how all Klingon survivors will be treated at Federation hands. Her concerns seem to be well-founded when Ensign Chekov takes out her bodyguard and then begins assaulting her. Kirk and Spock rescue her, and then show her firsthand evidence of the alien "entity" that has invaded the Enterprise and pitted Starfleet officers and Klingons against each other. She explains to Kirk that her people are hunters because there are poor planets in the Klingon system, and they must push outward to survive. She brokers a meeting between Kang and Kirk, which eventually leads to a truce. With "good spirits" from both parties, the alien entity flees the Enterprise.
Carol Marcus	Bibi Besch; Alice Eve	WOK, STID	Daughter of Admiral Alexander Marcus, Inventor of the Genesis Device, mother of Kirk's only known son.
David Marcus	Merritt Butrick	WOK, SFS	Son of James T. Kirk and Carol Marcus. Worked on developing the Genesis Device. Killed by Klingons on the Genesis planet.
Angela Martine	Barbara Baldavin	Balance of Terror, Shore Leave (TOS), Turnabout Intruder (TOS)	Martine first appears in "Balance of Terror" as a fire control specialist. Her wedding to Lieutenant Robert Tomlinson is postponed when the Enterprise receives a distress call from outposts being attacked by Romulans. The character later appears in "Shore Leave" as part of the landing party, and the communications officer in "Turnabout Intruder".
Crewman / Lt. Martinez	Michael Braveheart	The Child (TNG) recurring thereafter	Martinez was a male Human Starfleet officer medical assistant serving aboard the USS Enterprise-D and later USS Enterprise-E from 2365 to 2375. As his appearances continued, his rank rose from a crewman grade to lieutenant junior grade. He was a background character, appearing in a total of 84 episodes and two films, but the actor was never credited.
Martok	J. G. Hertzler	The Way of the Warrior (DS9) recurring thereafter	Klingon general, commander of Klingon Defence Forces in the Bajoran sector, later supreme commander of Klingon forces, Chancellor at the end. Blood-brother of Worf, husband of Sirella and father of Drex.
Masaka	None	Masks (TNG)	A feminine personality and queen associated with Masaka's sun symbol and Masaka's mask. According to a legend recounted by Data as Ihat, she chopped up her father and used his bones to make the world. Data assumes the personality of Masaka, puts on Masaka's mask and sits down upon the golden throne in Masaka's temple. Captain Picard poses as Korgano to confront Masaka.
Benjamin Maxwell	Bob Gunton	The Wounded (TNG)	One-time captain of Miles O'Brien aboard the USS Rutledge, then captain of the USS Phoenix who attempts an un-authorized mission to expose Cardassian military activity masquerading as scientific research In 2016, the character was ranked as the 94th most important character in service to Starfleet within the Star Trek science fiction universe by Wired.
Joseph M'Benga	Booker Bradshaw (TOS); Babs Olusanmokun (SNW)	A Private Little War, That Which Survives (TOS); SNW	A doctor aboard the USS Enterprise. The character interned on Vulcan, and is skilled at treating Vulcans.
Leonard McCoy	DeForest Kelley; Karl Urban	TOS, TAS, TMP, WOK, SFS, TVH, TFF, TUC, Encounter at Farpoint (TNG), ST09, STID, STB	Chief Medical Officer of the USS Enterprise and Enterprise-A under Captain Kirk.
Mila	Julianna McCarthy	Improbable Cause, The Dogs of War, What You Leave Behind (DS9)	Enabran Tain's housekeeper and confidant for several decades. Later helps Damar and his resistance cell to hide.
Minuet	Carolyn McCormick	11001001, Future Imperfect (TNG)	Riker's holodeck fantasy woman, created by the Bynars and reproduced by Barash
Gary Mitchell	Gary Lockwood	Where No Man Has Gone Before (TOS)	Starfleet lieutenant commander and ship's navigator. He and James T. Kirk have been friends since he joined the service, and Kirk asked for Mitchell aboard his first command. At Starfleet Academy, he remembers "Lieutenant" Kirk as being "a stack of books with legs," and that "in his class, you either think or sink." Mitchell also "aimed a little blonde lab technician" at Kirk, who almost married her. Later, on the planet Dimorus, Mitchell almost died from a poisoned dart thrown by "rodent things" who were aiming for Kirk. In 2265 aboard the Enterprise, Mitchell is "zapped" by the Galactic Barrier, which turns his eyes glowing silver and grants him enhanced ESP powers. As he grows stronger, he becomes a danger to the ship and crew, so Kirk is forced to maroon him on the planet Delta Vega. Mitchell doesn't go quietly, however, and Kirk is forced to kill him on the planet's surface.
Mogh	None	Sins of the Father (TNG)	Father of Worf and Kurn. Accused by Duras of betraying the Klingon colony on Khitomer to the Romulans, when the betrayal was committed by Duras' father, Ja'rod. Worf nevertheless accepted discommendation for his father's "crime" to prevent a Klingon civil war.
Mora Pol	James Sloyan	The Begotten (DS9), The Alternate (DS9)	Doctor at the Bajoran Center for Science, who was assigned to study the Changeling who would become known as Odo. As such, later functions as an expert on Changelings during the Dominion War.
James Moriarty	Daniel Davis	Elementary, Dear Data, Ship in a Bottle (TNG), The Bounty (PIC)	Character created by Arthur Conan Doyle, becomes sentient in the holodeck. Later appears as a holographic security projection created by the combined Data/Lore android on Daystrom Station.
Morn	Mark Allen Shepherd	Emissary (DS9) recurring thereafter, Birthright, Part 1 (TNG), Caretaker, Part 1 (VOY)	Regular at Quark's bar, known around the station for talking people's ears off, but never seen or heard talking on screen.
Morrow	Robert Hooks	SFS	Starfleet admiral who was designated the "Starfleet Commander" in 2285. He boarded the Enterprise for inspection on her return to Spacedock. He awarded Starfleet's highest commendations to the entire crew for their extraordinary service during the battle with Khan. He also promoted Scotty to "captain of engineering" and reassigned him to the USS Excelsior NX-2000. In addition, he announced that the Enterprise would be decommissioned, thereby denying Kirk the opportunity to take her back to the Genesis planet. Later, when Kirk pressed the issue and explained that Spock's katra must be reunited with his body, Morrow cautioned him against "intellectual chaos" and implored him to remain rational, lest he lose everything and destroy himself. (Noncanon: In the movie novelization, Morrow's first name is "Harry".)
Harcourt Fenton ("Harry") Mudd	Roger C. Carmel, Rainn Wilson	Mudd's Women, I, Mudd (TOS), Mudd's Passion (TAS), Choose Your Pain, Magic to Make the Sanest Man Go Mad (DSC), The Escape Artist (SHO)	Convicted confidence trickster, thief, counterfeiter and smuggler, first picked up by the Enterprise while trafficking the equivalent of mail-order brides, "ordinary" women allegedly made beautiful and alluring by a mythical "Venus drug". Later encountered as the prisoner/“ruler” of a race of androids who use him to learn about Human weaknesses.

== See also ==
- List of Star Trek characters A–F • N–S • T–Z
- List of recurring Star Trek: Deep Space Nine characters • Enterprise • The Next Generation • The Original Series • Voyager
- List of Star Trek episodes
