= Rightful Heir =

- Star Trek: The Next Generation episode
- Episode no.: Season 6 Episode 23
- Directed by: Winrich Kolbe
- Story by: James E. Brooks
- Teleplay by: Ronald D. Moore
- Production code: 249
- Original air date: May 17, 1993

Guest appearances
- Alan Oppenheimer - Koroth; Robert O'Reilly - Gowron; Norman Snow - Torin; Charles Esten - Divok; Kevin Conway - Kahless; Majel Barrett as Computer Voice

Episode chronology
← Previous "Suspicions"	Next → "Second Chances"
- Star Trek: The Next Generation season 6

"Rightful Heir" is the 149th episode of the American science fiction television series Star Trek: The Next Generation, and the 23rd episode of the sixth season.

Set in the 24th century, the series follows the adventures of the Starfleet crew of the Federation starship Enterprise-D. In this episode, Lieutenant Worf suffers a crisis of faith which leads him to an encounter with the seemingly resurrected messiah of ancient Klingon religious and historical beliefs, Kahless. He soon finds himself caught between supporting the religious figure and the more secular leader of the conventional Klingon political power structure.

This episode aired in broadcast syndication the week of May 15, 1993.

== Plot ==
Lt. Worf fails to report for duty, and Lieutenant Commander Data and Commander William Riker become concerned. Riker finds Worf's quarters filled with incense and burning candles while his chief of security sits before a small fire in a trance-like state. Worf later explains to Captain Picard that he was attempting to reconnect with his Klingon spiritual beliefs by summoning a vision of Kahless, the messianic warrior who founded the Klingon Empire. Picard suggests Worf immerse himself in Klingon culture, granting him leave to journey to the Temple of Boreth.

After ten days of doubt-filled rituals, Worf is approached by a physical manifestation of Kahless. Worf brings the prospective spiritual leader to the Enterprise, but is troubled that Kahless does not remember how Klingon warnog tastes or what Sto-Vo-Kor, the Klingon afterlife, is like.

Klingon Chancellor Gowron arrives with a test to prove whether Kahless is genuine. Gowron is displeased with the prophet's return, convinced he is an imposter foisted by the priests to gain power. Gowron requests that the Federation genetically test the dagger he brought, stained with the blood of Kahless in antiquity. The test indicates a match.

Gowron provokes a D'k tahg duel with Kahless and wins, leaving Worf to ponder how the "greatest warrior of all" could be beaten. Worf confronts Koroth, High Priest of the Boreth Temple, who admits that Kahless is a clone of the original, noting that the legend of Kahless' return did not specify the exact manner. He feels Kahless is needed to rally the people's faith. Data advises Worf that during a crisis of his own, he made a leap of faith to assume he could evolve beyond the sum of his programming.

Gowron is outraged when Worf tells him the truth and prepares to execute the clone and priests. Worf tells Gowron he supports Kahless, explaining that he made a leap of faith. He suggests the Klingon High Council appoint Kahless to the ceremonial position of Emperor; while only a figurehead, he might unite the Klingon people. Seeing the wisdom of cooperation, Gowron offers his devotion. Departing for the Klingon homeworld Qo'noS, Kahless notes the troubled demeanor of the "Son of Mogh" and reassures him that the beliefs espoused by Kahless made the ancient Klingons what they were; his spirit lives within the hearts of all true Klingons.

== Broadcast and releases ==
"Rightful Heir" was originally released in broadcast syndication on May 15, 1993. It received Nielsen ratings of 10.6 percent, placing it in third place in its timeslot. This was part of a brief decline in ratings towards the end of the season; "Suspicions", the episode broadcast prior, received ratings of 11.3 percent. The episode broadcast after "Rightful Heir", "Second Chances", received a rating of 9.7 percent.

The episode was released as part of the Star Trek: The Next Generation season six DVD box set in the United States on December 3, 2002. A remastered HD version was released on Blu-ray optical disc, on June 24, 2014.

On November 3, 1999 this episode and "Second Chances" were released together on LaserDisc in the United States for 34.98 USD. The episodes were on a single 12" double-sided optical disc with a Dolby Surround soundtrack.

== Reception ==
In 2011, The A.V. Club rated this episode an "A", praising Kahless (played by Kevin Conway), Worf, and the exploration of Klingon culture.

In the book Star Trek FAQ 2.0 (Unofficial and Unauthorized): Everything Left to Know About the Next Generation, the Movies and Beyond (2013) they said that Conway delivered a "righteous and inspiring" Kahless and it was one of Dorn's best performances as Worf.

In 2017, Io9 noted "Rightful Heir" for being one of the "weirdest" TNG adventures, with Worf helping to install a Kahless clone as Emperor of the Klingons.

== See also ==
- "The Sword of Kahless" (November 20, 1995)
