= Star Trek: Klingon =

1996 video game

- Developer: Simon & Schuster
- Publishers: Simon & Schuster
- Director: Jonathan Frakes
- Producer: Dan Dugan
- Writer: Hilary Bader
- Composer: Gregory Smith
- Series: Star Trek
- Platforms: Microsoft Windows, Mac OS
- Release: 1996
- Genre: Interactive movie
- Mode: Single-player

Star Trek: Klingon is an interactive movie video game set in the Star Trek universe. It was written by Hilary Bader, directed by Jonathan Frakes, and featured music by Gregory Smith. It was released in 1996 by Simon & Schuster for Microsoft Windows, and Mac OS.

Star Trek: Klingon featured a style of game called a full motion video, in which live-action clips would be played in relation to the gameplay. This meant the game includes footage of Gowron relating various lines, which was later noted among Star Trek enthusiasts in the 21st century.

The media has Robert O'Reilly cast as Gowron.

== Plot and gameplay ==
In order to dispel common misbeliefs regarding Klingons, Gowron (Robert O'Reilly) creates a holodeck "immersion studies" program to teach humans about his people's culture.

The player assumes the role of Pok, a young Klingon about to undergo the Rite of Ascension. The celebration is interrupted when Pok's father is killed during an assassination attempt on Gowron's life. Gowron and Pok then swear a blood oath to find the killers and bring them to honorable justice.

Because many of the choices in the game depend upon either Klingon cultural situations, or on explicit instructions given in the Klingon language, the game provides the player with a variety of educational tools. Within the game itself, the player can pause the story and examine objects in each scene to learn more about their significance. The third disc of the game features a language instruction program with a speech recognition engine by Dragon Systems, in addition to the audiobook Power Klingon, a cultural primer narrated by Michael Dorn. J. G. Hertzler (Martok, Star Trek: Deep Space Nine) provides the voice of Klingon Ler'at.

== Reception ==
A Next Generation critic called the game "little more than a video disc that makes you click the mouse every now and then to see more movie." He reasoned that while the production value, acting, and storyline of the video sequences are all good, they are still below average for any of the Star Trek television series, which could be watched on TV or even rented for far less than the cost of the game. He scored it one out of five stars.

Entertainment Weekly gave the game a B and wrote that "Unfortunately—since it's likely that nowadays more people are familiar with Klingon than Esperanto—the program teaches you virtually nothing about Klingon grammar or syntax, which may be an impediment when you apply for that translator's gig at the United Federation of Planets."

== See also ==
- Reunion (Star Trek: The Next Generation) (Gowron is introduced in this television episode which first aired November 5, 1990)
