= Star Trek: The Next Generation Interactive VCR Board Game =

1993 board game and videotape

Star Trek: The Next Generation Interactive VCR Board Game – A Klingon Challenge is a video board game created by Decipher, Inc., published by Milton Bradley in 1993. Based on the American science fiction television series Star Trek: The Next Generation, the game is set in the Star Trek universe, specifically on the USS Enterprise-D starship. The game uses a video tape that runs constantly while users play the board game portion. Events on the video tape combine with board game play to determine whether users win or lose the game. The video itself was directed by Les Landau and contains original footage filmed on the actual Star Trek: The Next Generation sets at Paramount Studios.

The Klingon character (Kavok) is played by actor Robert O'Reilly, who is famous for his role on the series as Gowron, chancellor of the Klingon High Council. Jonathan Frakes contributes to the game by reprising his role as William Riker and narrating the beginning of the videotape via log entry. This log entry sets the stage for the game play and subsequent events.

The game was originally released in 1993 with "limited edition" white box packaging but later releases had "general edition" black box packaging with updated graphics and flavor text.

The game takes about 1 hour to play and required a VCR with a television, while the players also have a board and must roll dice and draw cards.

== Plot ==
William Riker makes a log stating that the USS Enterprise-D has docked at Starbase 74 to undergo repairs to a damaged computer core that has been causing low-level malfunctions. The ship is practically empty, because Captain Jean-Luc Picard has granted shore leave to all personnel. The only people on the ship are the Starbase engineering team (the players) assigned to repairs.

Before the repairs are complete, Kavok, a Klingon who believes the Federation–Klingon alliance has made the Klingon Empire weak, hijacks the Enterprise upon beaming onto it and sets a course for the Klingon homeworld (Qo'noS), where he plans on using the Enterprise to start a war between the two space-faring powers.

The objective of the game is to regain control of the Enterprise and stop Kavok's plan. To do so, players will need to secure access to five levels of the main computer, obtain a phaser from Security, and successfully crawl down a Jefferies tube to access the Bridge to stop Kavok, all within the 60 minutes before the ship reaches the Klingon home world. At several points, Kavok will speak directly to the players, who must follow his instructions. There are multiple events in the videotape which affect game play. The player with the least Computer Access cards will cause Kavok to make them board a shuttle and leave the Enterprise where their abandonment of their fellow players will have them dishonor the Federation.

Once the countdown clock hits 00:00 and the players haven't stunned Kavok by that time, the ship reaches Qo'noS, all computer access cards no longer work, and the Enterprise is attacked by Klingon ships stationed there. The Enterprise manages to destroy one Bird of Prey before the Klingons hit the Enterprise's nacelle, destroying Enterprise, igniting a war and ending the game in defeat.

A postscript tells the players "You will have the opportunity to save the Enterprise...and your life! When the Enterprise first approached Starbase 74, the ship entered a repeating time warp. The instant it is destroyed by the Klingon Bird of Prey, the ship and its crew are thrust back in time to face anew the challenge of the mighty Klingon warrior, Kavok. Only those on board of the Enteprise can change the course of history and prevent intergalactic war. Make it so. When you rewind the tape, you will experience the "time warp" and move back in time."

== Cast ==
The game features video segments that are played at certain times, and these segments have actors playing Star Trek characters. This includes:

- Jonathan Frakes as William Riker narrates a voiceover log entry at the beginning of the game.
- Robert O'Reilly as Kavok

== Box contents and flavor text ==
=== Game box contents ===
1 60-minute VHS tape, 1 game board, 6 Tricorders, 6 phasers, 56 Computer Access cards, 12 Holodeck cards, 12 Klingon bIj cards, 6 male playing pieces, 6 female playing pieces, 6 plastic stands, 30 Isolinear chips, 6 Federation rank tokens, 4 Bridge tokens that either say "Computer Access Denied" or "You Stunned Kavok", 2 stasis fields, 1 dice, 1 plastic spinner with base, 1 sticker sheet with 18 communicators, 36 Federation rank pins, 1 spinner sticker, and 4 Medals of Valor.

== Reception ==
The A.V. Club notes that, in the 1980s and 1990s, VCR-based games came closer to offering audiences "immersive, interactive audio-visual experience" in a novel way. This title is noted for Robert O'Reilly playing a disgruntled Klingon that demands a response from players.

Rob Wieland of Game & Sundry called it "surreal" to see Robert O'Reilly cast as a Klingon other than Gowron in the video segments. He described the game as a "pretty basic board game", but said the video is a "campy delight" for fans.
