= Robert O'Reilly =

American actor (born 1950)

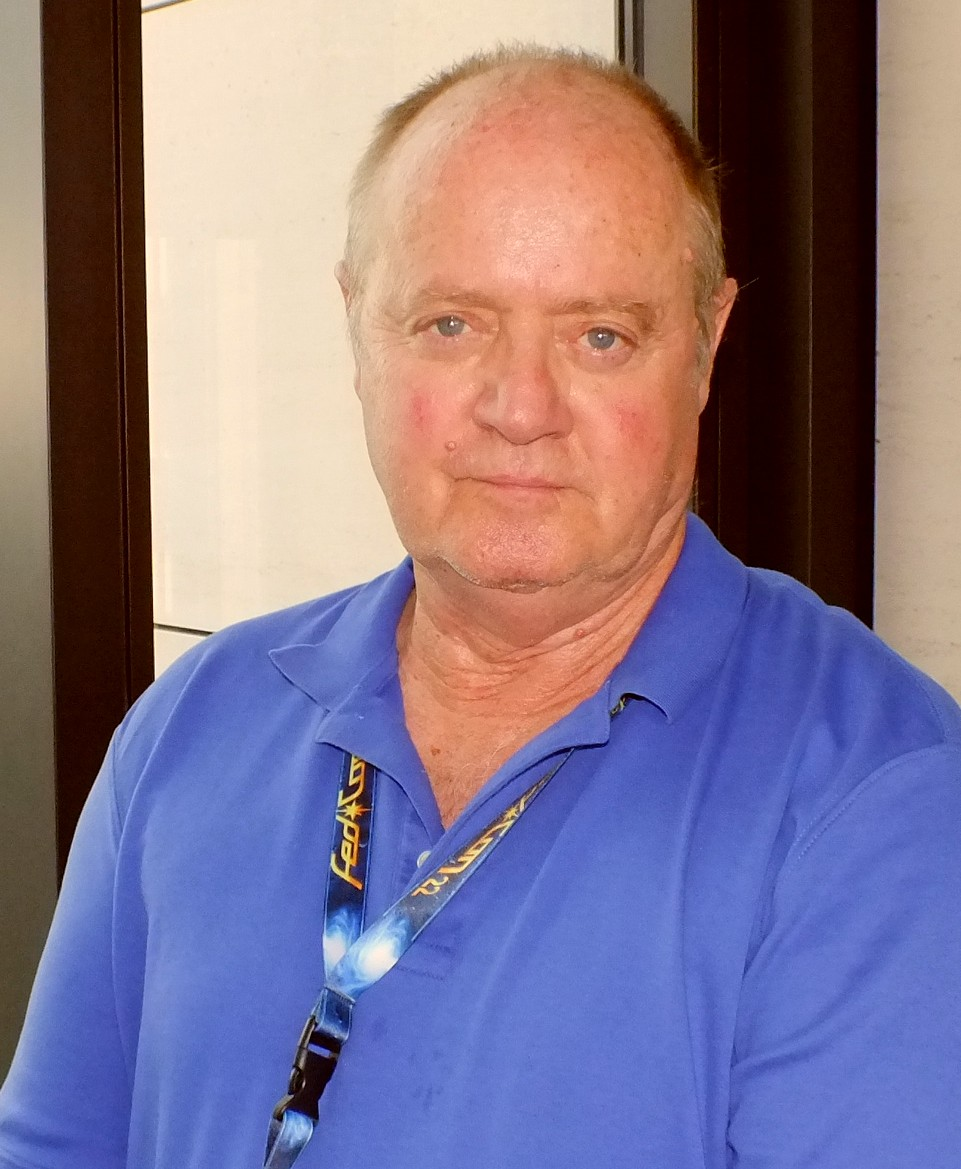
- Born: March 25, 1950 (age 76); New York City, U.S.
- Occupations: Actor, director
- Years active: 1979–2006; 2017
- Spouse: Judy O'Reilly

Robert O'Reilly (born March 25, 1950) is an American film, stage, and television actor who has appeared in a variety of roles. He appeared in the Star Trek franchise for over ten years, primarily in his recurring role on Star Trek: The Next Generation and Star Trek: Deep Space Nine as Chancellor Gowron, the leader of the Klingon Empire. He has also appeared in over 100 films and television episodes, and has acted on Broadway and at Carnegie Hall. His links with the Colony Theatre Company resulted in his receiving a Drama-Logue Award in 1981 for directing the play Getting Out.

== Career ==
O'Reilly has appeared in over a hundred films and television episodes, primarily as either the antagonist or as a villain. The television series he has appeared in include Cheers, Darkroom, Knight Rider, The Fall Guy, Sledge Hammer!, MacGyver, In the Heat of the Night, NYPD Blue, and twice in Dallas. His film appearances include the Jim Carrey film The Mask. He has retired from acting.

=== Star Trek ===
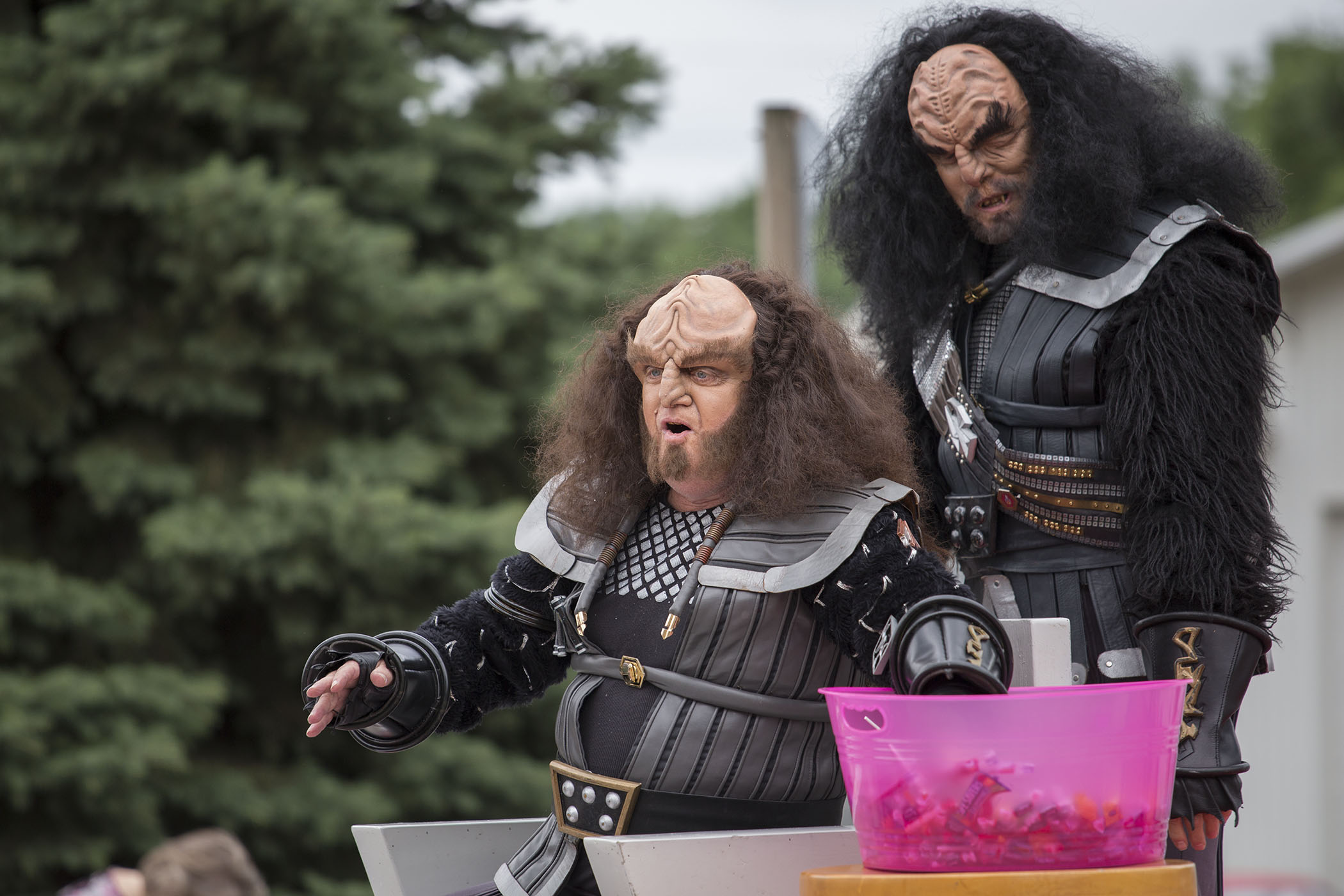
O'Reilly (sitting) as Gowron, with J. G. Hertzler as Martok, at the Riverside Trek Fest in 2014

O'Reilly made his first appearance in the Star Trek franchise with an appearance in the Star Trek: The Next Generation episode "Manhunt". The character he played in that episode has been referred to both as "Tough guy" and "Scarface". He was then cast as the Klingon Gowron in the episode "Reunion" which saw the character become the new Chancellor of the Klingon Empire. O'Reilly had just finished appearing on stage as Edmund in King Lear and saw similarities between the two characters which resulted in him basing Gowron upon the Shakespearian character. The episode was directed by TNG cast member Jonathan Frakes, and O'Reilly later said that he thought he was hired both for the sense of curiosity he brought to the role and a piercing, unsettling gaze he and others referred to as "that crazy loon eyeball thing".

He went on to appear as Gowron over the course of the next decade in several further episodes of The Next Generation, as well as Star Trek: Deep Space Nine. He also filmed segments for the video game Star Trek: Klingon, which was also directed by Frakes. The game was the first Star Trek game to use real actors, and was awarded the Sci-Fi Universe Reader's Choice Universe Award for Best Achievement in Genre Multi-Media. At the time of filming the game, he had heard a rumour that Michael Dorn was joining the cast of Deep Space Nine. Given the relationship between Gowron and Dorn's character, Worf, O'Reilly thought that this might lead to his return to a Star Trek television series too. Both Dorn and O'Reilly reprised their characters together in the season four opening episode "The Way of the Warrior". O'Reilly also appeared as a different Klingon in the Star Trek: The Next Generation Interactive VCR Board Game, a video cassette-based board game. His likeness was used for three action figures, a life-size poster and several lithographs.

After the end of Deep Space Nine, O'Reilly made one further appearance in Star Trek as the character Kago-Darr in the Star Trek: Enterprise episode "Bounty". He was thankful for the role, as he felt that the writers and producers of the show had created it for him specifically as his family was trying to adapt following the birth of his triplets. After his retirement from acting, he continues to attend Star Trek conventions, including performing in character as Gowron alongside J. G. Hertzler as fellow Klingon Martok. In 2020, he reprised the voice of Gowron and the Klingon Aakar, an ancestor of Gowron's, in the video game Star Trek Online.

=== Theatre ===
O'Reilly has appeared on Broadway in the revival of The Tavern, and also appeared off-Broadway in The Promise and at Carnegie Hall in / by Nam June Paik. He is currently associated with the Colony Theatre Company as an actor and director. He first became involved with the theatre company about a year after its founding. Amongst these was Getting Out by Marsha Norman, for which he was awarded a Drama-Logue Award and nominated for an award by the Los Angeles Drama Critics' Circle in 1981. He directed Generations by Dennis Clontz, which was runner up to the American Theatre Critics' Association award for best new play outside of New York.

== Filmography ==
Robert O'Reilly film and television credits
Year	Title	Role	Notes	Ref
1979	Fantasy Island	Gustav	1 episode	
1981	Archie Bunker's Place	Thug	1 episode	
1981	Flamingo Road		1 episode	
1981	CHiPs	Ryan	1 episode	
1981	The Incredible Hulk	Sonny	Episode: "Patterns" (S4.E18)	
1981	McClain's Law	Carl	1 episode	
1981	Darkroom	Sebastian	1 episode	
1982	World War III	Maj. Veigh	TV miniseries	
1982	The Phoenix	Dolfo	1 episode	
1982	Father Murphy	Clete Walker	1 episode	
1983	Bring 'Em Back Alive	Rolf Schuller	1 episode	
1983	Voyagers!	Klaus	1 episode	
1983	The Tom Swift and Linda Craig Mystery Hour	Man with the gun	TV movie	
1982–1984	The Fall Guy	Troy / Ice / Delaney	3 episodes	
1983–1985	T. J. Hooker	Sheehan / Jack Riker	2 episodes	
1984–1985	Knight Rider	Synder / Jack Simpson	2 episodes	
1984	Hill Street Blues	Nolan	Episode: "Nichols from Heaven"	
1986	Highway to Heaven	Cal	Episode: "The Torch" (S2.E21)	
1986	The Equalizer	Fur Collar Man	Episode: "Dead Drop" (S1.E15)	
1986	The Equalizer	Chance	Episode: "Tip on a Sure Thing" (S2.E9)	
1986-1987	Sledge Hammer!	Ganger / Assassin	2 episodes	
1989	Star Trek: The Next Generation	Scarface	Episode: "Manhunt"	
1990–1993	Star Trek: The Next Generation	Gowron	4 episodes "Reunion" (S4.E7) "Redemption" (S4.E26) "Redemption II" (S5.E1) "Rightful Heir" (S6.E23)	
1991	The Flash	Victor Kelso	Episode "Fast Forward" (S1.E15)	
1992-1993	In The Heat of the Night	Carl DeLissa	2 Episodes	
1993	Star Trek: The Next Generation Interactive VCR Board Game	Kavok	Video game	
1994	The Mask	The Figure	Film	
1996	Star Trek: Klingon	Gowron	Video game	
1998	Star Trek: The Next Generation: Klingon Honor Guard	Gowron (voice)	Video game	
1994–1999	Star Trek: Deep Space Nine	Gowron	8 episodes "The House of Quark" (S3.E3) "The Way of the Warrior (Star Trek: Deep Space Nine)" (S4.E1) "Broken Link" (S4.E25) "Apocalypse Rising" (S5.E1) "By Inferno's Light" (S5.E15) "Badda-Bing Badda-Bang" (S7.E15) "When It Rains…" (S7.E21) "Tacking into the Wind" (S7.E22)	
1999	The Omega Code	Technician	Film	
2003	Star Trek: Enterprise	Kago-Darr	Episode: "Bounty"	
2003	Star Trek: Elite Force II	Krindo (voice)	Video game	
2010	Star Trek Online	Aakar (voice)	Video game	
2019	The Circuit: Star Crew		Film	

== Personal life ==
O'Reilly's wife Judy gave birth to triplet sons Jack, Michael and Joseph in 1997. The family reside in Burbank, California. O'Reilly's hobbies include golf and baseball.
