= Star Trek: The Next Generation: Klingon Honor Guard =

1998 video game

Star Trek: The Next Generation – Klingon Honor Guard
- Developers: MicroProse; Westlake Interactive (Macintosh)
- Publishers: MicroProse; MacSoft (Macintosh)
- Designer: Christopher Clark
- Programmer: Les Bird
- Artist: Daniel Mycka
- Composers: Roland Rizzo; Mark Cromer; Mark Reis
- Engine: Unreal Engine 1
- Platforms: Mac OS, Microsoft Windows
- Release: Windows: NA: October 14, 1998; UK: October 22, 1998; Macintosh: NA: January 1999
- Genre: First-person shooter
- Modes: Single-player, multiplayer

Star Trek: The Next Generation – Klingon Honor Guard is a 1998 first-person shooter set in the universe of Star Trek during the time of The Next Generation. The game was developed by MicroProse, using the Unreal game engine. The critical response to the title was generally positive with praise for the graphics, but mixed opinions of the level design.

== Gameplay and story ==
Aftermath of battle aboard a Klingon D7 cruiser

As a new member of the Klingon Honor Guard, the player is given the mission of foiling a plot to assassinate Chancellor Gowron. During the course of the game, the player encounters a variety of environments, including planet surfaces, caverns, enemy ships, and space stations. Enemies include rival Klingons (including members of the House of Duras), Andorians, attack robots, Nausicaans, Letheans, and various hostile creatures. The game includes twenty missions across 26 maps. Weapons that the player can use include disruptors, the Klingon Bat'leth, grenade launchers, and a gun which creates a miniature black hole.

Multiplayer supported up to eight players via LAN. On the internet up to 4 players was supported. Multiplayer modes included co-op, death match (which the game called 'Death Rite Matches', and bots.

== Development ==
Klingon Honor Guard was the second game to use the Unreal game engine. MicroProse both developed and published the game. It was released in Europe in early 1998, with the release in the United States following on October 14.

The voice acting talent for the game included Tony Todd as Captain Kurn, Robert O'Reilly as Gowron, and Barbara March and Gwynyth Walsh as the Duras sisters Lursa and B'Etor.

== Reception ==
Reception

Aggregate score
Aggregator	Score
GameRankings	72%

Review scores
Publication	Score
AllGame	3.5/5
CNET Gamecenter	8/10
Computer Games Strategy Plus	3.5/5
Computer Gaming World	3.5/5
GamePro	3.5/5
GameRevolution	B
GameSpot	6.4/10
IGN	7/10
MacLife	(Mac) "Spiffy"
PC Accelerator	5/10
PC Gamer (US)	60%

The game received positive reviews according to the review aggregation website GameRankings. Thierry Nguyen of GameSpot thought that the game suffered from the same problems as the original Unreal and replicated some of the enemies seen in that game but with different graphics, albeit in greater quantities. Whilst he thought that level design improved as the game went on, he also found that the gameplay broke down into finding objects to open locked doors in order to reach the final room which completed the level. He pointed out that multiplayer was effectively unplayable at launch, with a patch promised, and while it might be enjoyable for a Star Trek fan, it was otherwise quite average. Tal Blevins of IGN said that he was pleased to see that the intelligent enemies which had appeared in Unreal continued to be seen in Klingon Honor Guard, but found a variety of graphic and gameplay bugs as well as suffering from at least one computer crash per level which gave it a very rushed feeling. Overall Blevins felt that the game seemed like it was a Klingon style overlay for Unreal and not really a brand new game.

Nick Smith of AllGame said that despite the Star Trek license, Klingon Honor Guard was a "truly excellent game in its own right". He said that the action ran as fast as Doom, while the missions were inventive. He said "Whether you're a true Trekker, a first-person shooter fan, or just an eye-candy junkie, this title will not disappoint you." In a retro review for Eurogamer in 2010, John Walker criticized the length of the game but praised the level design for the mission where the player fights enemies on the outside of a spaceship. He also reserved praise for the Ding-Pach Spin Claw, a weapon which fires off a blade which eventually returns but cannot be fired again until the blade returns. He summed it up by saying that it was a "game that is, unquestionably, fantastically overlong and dull. But a game that contains the thrill of space floating combined with the best FPS weapon ever made." Chris Chan for the Malaysian-based English language newspaper New Straits Times ranked the game as the eighth best Macintosh-based game of the 1990s.
