= Eye of the Beholder (Star Trek: The Next Generation) =

- Star Trek: The Next Generation episode
- Episode no.: Season 7 Episode 18
- Directed by: Cliff Bole
- Story by: Brannon Braga
- Teleplay by: René Echevarria
- Production code: 270
- Original air date: February 28, 1994

Guest appearances
- Mark Rolston - Walter Pierce; Nancy Harewood - Nara; Tim Lounibos - Lt. Daniel Kwan; Johanna McCloy - Maddy Calloway; Nora Leonhardt - Marla E. Finn; Dugan Savoye - William Hodges; Majel Barrett - Computer Voice

Episode chronology
| ← Previous "Masks" | Next → "Genesis" |
- Star Trek: The Next Generation season 7

"Eye of the Beholder" is the 170th episode of the American science fiction television series Star Trek: The Next Generation, the 18th episode of the seventh season. It contains the first depiction in any Star Trek TV series or films of the inside of a starship's warp nacelle, and the only one until 2002's Star Trek: Enterprise episode "The Catwalk".

Set in the 24th century, the series follows the adventures of the Starfleet crew of the Federation starship Enterprise-D. In this episode, Troi investigates a crewman's suicide and discovers that a murder was committed on the ship while it was being built, and that the murderer is still aboard.

== Plot ==
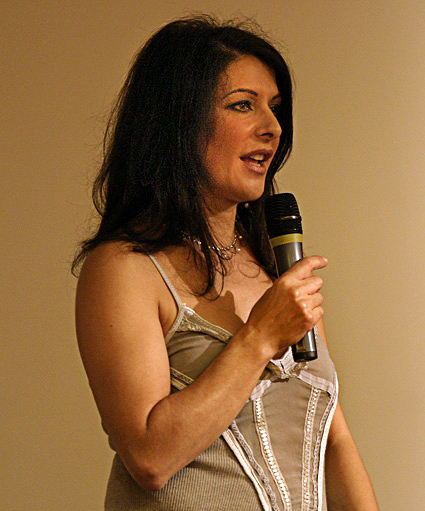
Marina Sirtis is cast as Deanna Troi, a half-Betazoid Starfleet officer who uses her telepathic abilities to navigate her duties and personal life. In this episode she must solve a whodunnit

Lieutenant Daniel Kwan kills himself by jumping into the plasma discharge in one of the warp nacelle tubes aboard the Enterprise, after commenting "they were laughing at me" and "I know what I have to do". Captain Picard assigns Worf and Deanna Troi to investigate the death. Kwan's personal logs and quarters reveal no traces of depression; in fact, he appeared to be happy to spend the next few days with his girlfriend, Ensign Calloway, and only had a slight but normal dislike for his superior Lieutenant Nara.

They talk to Nara at the nacelle but find that she had nothing against Kwan. Troi stands at the platform overlooking the plasma discharge and is suddenly awash with emotions, disorienting her. Dr. Crusher determines that her empathic senses were overloaded and suggests rest. Troi and Worf discuss that she may have been affected by an empathic "echo" left by Kwan, who also had weak empathic abilities. They return to the nacelle, where Troi experiences a series of visions: that of a woman backing away in fright from a red-haired man; equipment from Utopia Planitia, the starbase where the Enterprise was constructed; and later the same woman kissing another man in a closet. Worf breaks her out of these visions, and they determine that they were from events eight years ago during the Enterprise's construction. Troi is able to recognize the red-haired man as Lieutenant Walter Pierce, who is currently serving aboard the ship; Pierce had been Kwan's superior at Utopia Planitia as well. They speak to Pierce, but he claims to have no knowledge. After they leave him, Troi admits to Worf that she could not read Pierce, and believes him to also be partially empathic. As they prepare to retire for the night, Troi and Worf fall into a deep kiss, and spend the night together.

The next day, Dr. Crusher provides Troi with a neural inhibitor to block Troi's empathic sense to allow her to safely visit the nacelle. Worf is indifferent to Troi and instead provides her with Calloway to help. Troi, with Data and La Forge, examines the plasma conduit that Kwan was working before his death, and Troi is overcome with the same visions despite the inhibitor. She asserts there is something hidden in the conduit; La Forge discovers a human skeleton, what's left of a woman's body, embedded in the ship, identified as Ensign Marla Finn, the woman from Troi's visions. Troi finds that Finn disappeared at Utopia Planitia before Kwan's arrival, and comes to suspect Pierce of killing her, believing the visions being from his point of view. She convinces Worf to arrest Pierce, but finds Worf taking more of an interest in Calloway. Troi returns to her quarters and is surprised when Pierce arrives; fearing for her life, Troi tries to contact Worf but discovers he is in Calloway's quarters. She races there, and is shocked to find them embraced, and they turn to laugh at her. In a fit, she picks up a phaser and kills Worf. Shocked by her action, she stumbles out of Calloway's quarters, to find Pierce there; he tells her "you know what to do". Troi agrees and races to the nacelle tube and prepares to jump into the plasma like Kwan did before, but she is stopped by a very-much alive Worf.

Troi is broken out of her vision, and learns that it has only been a few seconds since she first arrived at the nacelle. Reviewing records show that Pierce, Finn, and the other man from her vision were all killed at Utopia Planitia from a plasma discharge, likely as a result of Pierce seeing Finn with the other man after being romantically involved with Finn. She suspects Pierce was empathic, as she and Kwan had experienced the psychic residue from his death that still remains in the plasma conduit. With the case solved, Worf asks Troi about being surprised to see him after stopping her from jumping. She replies that she had seen him killed in her hallucination. When Worf inquires about who killed him, Troi coyly replies, "Hell hath no fury like a woman scorned."

== Cultural references ==
The website Women at Warp compares the "past love affair gone bad plays out again and again" theme with the Buffy the Vampire Slayer episode "I Only Have Eyes for You." "In both episodes, the spirit left behind by a man whose love affair turned tragic inhabits the minds of key female characters. When Troi investigates a crew member's suicide, she becomes entranced by the telepathic memory of Lt. Pierce, who killed his lover and then killed himself. Seeing through his eyes, she seems to live out his memories, killing Lt. Worf then attempting to kill herself. In the Buffyverse, the ghost of a young man who killed his lover then himself, causes Buffy to attempt to act out the same events with her lover, Angel. Both are ultimately saved by the lovers they thought they murdered."

== Video releases ==
This was released in Japan on LaserDisc on October 9, 1998 as part of the half-season collection Log.14: Seventh Season Part.2. This set included episodes from "Lower Decks" to Part II of "All Good Things", with English and Japanese audio tracks. The episode has also been released as part of the seventh season boxsets of The Next Generation on DVD and Blu Ray as well as digital releases.
