= The Way of the Warrior (Star Trek: Deep Space Nine) =

- Star Trek: Deep Space Nine episodes
- Episode nos.: Season 4 Episodes 1 and 2
- Directed by: James L. Conway
- Written by: Ira Steven Behr; Robert Hewitt Wolfe
- Cinematography by: Jonathan West
- Production code: 718
- Original air date: October 2, 1995

Guest appearances
- Andrew Robinson as Elim Garak; Penny Johnson Jerald as Kasidy Yates; Marc Alaimo as Dukat; Robert O'Reilly as Gowron; J. G. Hertzler as Martok; Obi Ndefo as Drex; Christopher Darga as Kaybok; William Dennis Hunt as Huraga

Episode chronology
← Previous "The Adversary"	Next → "The Visitor"
- Star Trek: Deep Space Nine season 4

"The Way of the Warrior" is the first episode from the fourth season of the American syndicated science fiction television series Star Trek: Deep Space Nine, counting as the 73rd and the 74th episodes overall as it is a double-length episode. Michael Dorn joins the cast of Deep Space Nine as Worf, a character originating on the preceding series, Star Trek: The Next Generation.

Set in the 24th century, the series follows the adventures on Deep Space Nine, a space station located near a stable wormhole between the Alpha and Gamma quadrants of the Milky Way Galaxy. In this episode, war breaks out between the Klingons and the Cardassians, two alien races with unsteady alliances with the United Federation of Planets; the Klingons' aggression jeopardizes the peace between them and the Federation, and Worf, as the only Klingon officer in Starfleet, is brought in to deal with the situation. In the chronology of the fictional Star Trek universe, this takes place one year after the events of the film Star Trek Generations, Worf's previous appearance.

"The Way of the Warrior" ranked third in its time slot with a Nielsen rating of 8.5. The episode introduces a new version of the opening credits sequence, which would continue to be used for the remainder of the series.

== Plot ==
A Klingon armada led by General Martok arrives at Deep Space Nine; Martok tells Captain Sisko they are there to defend their Federation allies against potential invasion from the Dominion, a hostile empire led by the shape-shifting Changelings. As the Klingon soldiers spread throughout the station, they cause disruptions, and beat up the Cardassian tailor and former spy Garak. A Klingon ship detains Kasidy Yates's freighter to search the ship for Changelings. It takes a show of force from Sisko in the Defiant to convince the Klingon commander to back off; but the Klingons continue detaining ships just outside Deep Space Nine's jurisdiction.

Sisko sends for the sole Klingon in Starfleet, Lieutenant Commander Worf, to help deal with the Klingons. Although Worf is considering resigning from Starfleet, he investigates the Klingon fleet and discovers its true purpose: the Klingon Empire plans on attacking Cardassia. The Cardassian military government has been overthrown in favor of the civilian Detapa Council, but the Klingons believe that the coup was engineered by the Dominion as a way to take control of Cardassia. Sisko warns Martok that such an attack would jeopardize the Federation's alliance with the Klingons, but Martok orders the invasion to proceed. Sisko allows Garak to overhear news of the invasion; he in turn warns Cardassia. Once the Federation condemns the invasion, the Klingon Empire withdraws from the Khitomer Accords, ending its alliance with the Federation. Klingon chancellor Gowron invites Worf to join the invasion, but Worf refuses out of loyalty to Starfleet, jeopardizing his family's social status in the Klingon Empire.

Sisko convinces the Detapa Council to flee Cardassia and seek refuge at DS9, escorted by the Defiant. At the rendezvous point, the Cardassians are attacked by Klingon ships; the Defiant joins the battle, rescuing the Council. When the Defiant returns to DS9, Sisko informs Gowron that the council members are not Changelings, but Gowron orders his fleet to attack DS9 anyway. DS9 defends itself with newly upgraded weapons systems, destroying many Klingon ships; Klingon boarding parties beam into DS9, but the crew fights them off and regains control of the situation.

With Starfleet reinforcements on their way, the Klingon ships have no choice but to retreat. Over Martok's protest, Gowron calls off the invasion of Cardassia, but refuses to cede the outlying Cardassian planets the Klingons have already seized. Worf decides to remain in Starfleet and accepts the post of Strategic Operations Officer on DS9.

== Production ==
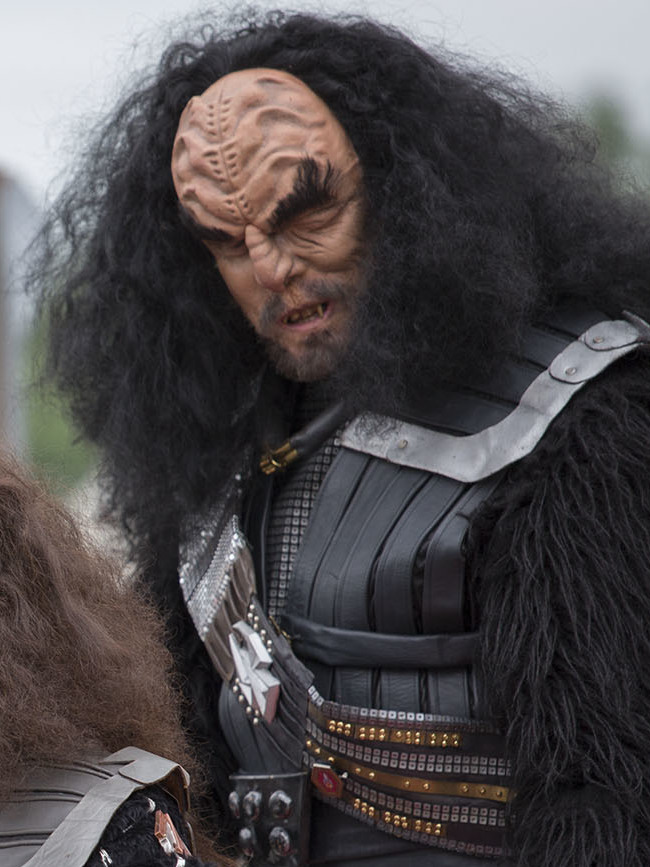
This episode introduces the Klingon general Martok.

This episode reveals a bald new look for Benjamin Sisko. Before Star Trek Avery Brooks starred in the television series Spenser for Hire as Hawk, in that role his head was shaved and he wore a goatee. His contract for Deep Space Nine stipulated that he not shave his head, and it was not until season 4 and this episode that he was allowed to do so.

Michael Dorn joined the cast of Deep Space Nine as Worf, the character he played for seven seasons of Star Trek: The Next Generation. Dorn had been glad to see the end of the time-consuming makeup required to portray a Klingon, but when producer Rick Berman asked if he might be consider coming back, he surprised himself and said yes to the opportunity. Dorn talked with the writers and producers about how his character could be a catalyst for change, and how Worf would bring a different perspective to the show.

Director James L. Conway really enjoyed directing the episode. It was an action packed script and had to introduce Michael Dorn. He didn't have any more time than usual, but did have more extras. The two-hour double episode was filmed over sixteen days, in two eight-day filming weeks. Conway saw "Way of the Warrior" as an opportunity to prove himself and put everything he could into the episode, and demonstrate his potential to be the director on the next Star Trek feature film.

Although the shots are often brief, there are various spacecraft from the Cardassians, Klingons and Federation shown in this episode, especially a wide range of Klingon spaceships. This included a new spacecraft design model, the very large Negh'Var, which is the flagship of the Klingon fleet. Other ships shown include the Vor'cha, which was first seen in "Reunion" on The Next Generation. The Vor'cha was designed by Rick Sternbach and the physical model was built by Greg Jein according to The Star Trek Encyclopedia by Okuda and others.

== Reception ==
"The Way of the Warrior" ranked third in its time slot with a Nielsen rating of 8.5.

In 2012, Zack Handlen, reviewing this episode for The A.V. Club, said it was "a terrific 90 minutes of television, building to its conclusions slowly but without hesitation, using threats the show has spent the last three seasons carefully establishing to shift the main arc in an unexpected direction." He commended the writers for the use of the Klingons, saying: "It's hard to remember the last time the Klingons have come across as dangerous on a Trek series." He praised the writing of characters including Sisko, Martok, Worf, Quark, Odo and Garak. In 2014, Keith R.A. DeCandido of Tor.com rated the episode ten out of ten. He called it "the perfect season-opener, giving everyone a moment in the sun, introducing a new character to the ensemble, and kicking the storyline from a year ago into high gear" and praised all the performances, as well as the episode's effectiveness at integrating Worf into the main cast. DeCandido highlighted the scene where Quark compares the Federation to root beer as "one of the single best conversations in any Star Trek series ever." Finally, he praised Avery Brooks "whose charisma shines through" and that Sisko is "the biggest badass in the room".

In 2015, Geek.com recommended this episode as "essential watching" for their abbreviated Star Trek: Deep Space Nine binge-watching guide, remarking that "this episode contains one of the coolest space battles in the entire series" and a plot involving the Klingons and Deep Space Nine. In their binge watching guide, Wired said the episode contained the best scene from the series, "in which Quark and Garak talk politics and put the appeal of the Federation in a whole new light".

The episode was frequently rated among the best episodes of Deep Space Nine and of all Star Trek. In 2012, Den of Geek ranked this the eighth best episode of Star Trek: Deep Space Nine, commending it for effectively incorporating Worf into the series. In 2018, Vulture rated "The Way of the Warrior" the fifth best episode of Star Trek: Deep Space Nine, calling the introduction of Worf the perfect addition to the show. In 2020, SciFiNow ranked this first of the top ten episodes of Star Trek: Deep Space Nine. In 2020, The Digital Fix ranked this episode as the seventh best episode of Star Trek: Deep Space Nine. They thought the episode was "a great Worf story" in which Worf makes his mark as a new member of the cast without dominating the other characters.

Hollywood.com rated "The Way of the Warrior" among the best of the Klingon-centric episodes in Star Trek. In 2014, Io9 listed this episode 38th in its list of the top 100 Star Trek episodes. In 2016, Empire ranked this the 22nd best episode of all Star Trek. In 2016, Vox rated this one of the top 25 essential episodes of all Star Trek. In 2018, CBR ranked "The Way of the Warrior" as the seventh best episodic saga of all Star Trek.

In 2016, Radio Times ranked the attack of the Klingons in this episode as the 40th greatest moment in all Star Trek, including films and television up to that time.

In 2017, CBR ranked Gowron's flagship, the Negh'Var warship, the third most powerful spacecraft of Star Trek: Deep Space Nine. CNET ranked it among the most powerful and important fictional spacecraft of the Star Trek franchise.

== Releases ==
In November 1996, "The Way of the Warrior" was released on LaserDisc format in the United Kingdom. On August 5, 1998, "The Way of the Warrior" was released on LaserDisc format in Japan, as part of the 4th Season Vol. 1 box set.

"The Way of the Warrior" was released on VHS by Paramount Home Video. Paramount re-released the episode in 1997 as part of the "Star Trek: The Greatest Battles" gift set.

It was released on DVD as part of the season four box set on August 5, 2003. In 2006, the episode was also released as part of the DVD box set "Star Trek Fan Collective - Klingon". This episode was released in 2017 on DVD with the complete series box set, which had 176 episodes. The set had 48 discs and also included several features.

== Novel ==
A novelization of the episode was written by Diane Carey, and published by Simon and Schuster.
