= Klingon High Council =

Ruling body of Klingon Empire in Star Trek

- Star Trek race

In-universe information
- Other name: tlhIngan yejquv
- Creation date: 2069
- Base of operations: Great Hall of the First City
- Language: Klingoni
- Affiliation: Qo'noS
- Leader: Chancellor

In the fictional Star Trek universe the Klingon High Council (in Klingon tlhIngan yejquv) is the supreme ruling body of the Klingon Empire. The council meets at the Great Hall of the First City of the Klingon Empire on the planet Qo'noS (also known as Kronos in Federation standard).

One of the writers responsible for Klingon background was Ronald D. Moore, who wrote famous Klingon episodes such as "Sins of the Father", where the Klingon High Council is first depicted in Star Trek. Later episodes and content in the franchise showed or referenced the High Council.

The sets for the High Council building, called The Great Hall, was designed by Richard James; this and other settings won an Emmy award for best art direction.

== Production and writing ==
Star Trek writer Ronald D. Moore had a reputation among the writers for having a talent for Klingon episodes, after he worked on the Star Trek: The Next Generation episode "Sins of the Father". He also worked on the Klingon romantic comedy episode "House of Quark", which also featured the Klingon High Council.

An example of scenes with the High Council for example show Gowron in the Great Hall, where they meets. Showing, the High Council in hall posed a budget challenge for set design for the producer David Livingston, to produce the Great Hall set in "House of Quark". This was solved by only making half of the great hall, and then by coordinating with the director; the set would be redressed between shots to show the other half of the hall. The Klingon Great Hall was designed by Richard James for "Sins of Father"; the Great Hall and others sets won an Emmy.

The exterior of the hall was a painting by Syd Dutton of Illusion Arts.

One of the major episodes involving the High Council, was "Redemption". Written by Ronald D. Moore, it aired as a cliffhanger with two parts in between seasons four and five of Star Trek: The Next Generation. The story involved control of the Klingon High Council and involved many characters such as Worf, Gowron, Picard, the Duras sisters, and involving Starfleet and the Romulans as well.

== Form ==
The High Council is presided over by the Chancellor, and is composed of a loosely faction-based, informal cabinet. Prominent members are generally leaders of one of the various Houses of the Empire – most of the seats are hereditary and some are conferred on distinguished figures, as with the House of Lords, the exact number of council members is not known. The Chancellor sits in an elevated chair at the front of the room, and the other council members surround him in a semicircle. A large Klingon insignia hangs on the wall at the front of the room, which is located behind the council members.

The council directs the political, diplomatic, military and internal matters of state. The Chancellor is empowered to enter into treaties on behalf of the council and the people, and has general executive power, although he is considered a primus inter pares subordinate to the Emperor. They also provide overall strategic direction on military matters, but in practice tactical and logistical matters are left to the battlefield commanders.

The council is also the final Court of Appeal, deciding matters pertaining to the various Klingon Houses. One example would be granting dispensation to allow a woman to rule over a house if her husband died in unusual circumstances and they had no sons (DS9's "The House of Quark"). If one of the Houses falls and another makes a claim to the lands and property of the House, the council will judge the validity of the claim.

The council acts as all three branches of government - executive, legislative and judicial. For crimes committed against the Empire, the council can judge the guilt of an individual Klingon and his entire family. If the Klingon is found guilty of a crime, he and his entire family will suffer the consequences of the crime. For example, treason causes the family to lose their honor for seven generations.

It appears that the members of the council serve at the pleasure of the Chancellor. This is the reason that Worf's brother Kurn was granted a seat on the council after the 2367 civil war, and was later taken from Kurn when Worf refused Gowron's orders to turn against the Federation in 2372.

The Chancellor has, at various times, been informally referred to as "leader" of the High Council (TNG's "Unification I"). Formally, however, the role also carries the title of "Klingon supreme commander" (TNG's "Reunion"), which presumably means commander-in-chief of the military.

The means of choosing the Chancellor vary. One way would be challenging the Chancellor to a fight to the death. If the challenger was victorious, the old Chancellor would be dead, and the challenger would usually take the role of Chancellor for himself, or in rare cases bestow the role to another. If a Chancellor died of natural causes or not as a result of direct combat, an Arbiter of Succession would be named. The Arbiter would designate the strongest challengers, who would then fight each other to the death for the office. There is one known time when a Chancellor named his own successor - shortly after the Praxis explosion Chancellor Gorkon named his daughter Azetbur as Chancellor in the event of his death.

== History ==
For at least 300 years prior to the events of Star Trek: The Next Generation, the Klingon Empire had been ruled by the High Council. The various High Councils during this time had to deal with monumental events in the history of the Klingon race and the galaxy at large, such as first contact with the humans, years of armed conflict with the Federation, the explosion of Praxis, détente and peace with the Federation, a civil war over the succession crisis, a war of aggression against Cardassia, renewed conflict with the Federation, a restoration of their alliance with the Federation, and the galaxy-wide Dominion War.

=== The Emperor ===
Prior to the mid-21st century, an Emperor presided over the Klingon Empire. Whether the High Council existed or not is open to debate; as is what role, if any, the High Council played. The Klingon-language translation of Hamlet suggests that the Emperor is "First Among Equals" in Klingon politics - but this may not be the generally accepted view in the Star Trek universe. From about the mid 21st century to 2369, there was no Emperor.

In 2369, Kahless the Unforgettable apparently reappeared on the planet Boreth; upon which the original Kahless said he would one day return. It was later revealed that the monks living there had created a clone of Kahless because they felt Klingon society was on the decline, and that only Kahless could bring them back to their former glory. Though the deception was soon revealed, Worf felt that the clone could still play a valuable role in Klingon society. Worf managed to convince Gowron to accept Kahless as Emperor. Rather than serve as an absolute monarch, as previous emperors had done, the Emperor would be a spiritual figurehead of national identity, similar to the Japanese Emperor, while the actual power would still rest with the Chancellor and the High Council. The Klingon people were told not that this new Kahless was a clone, but that he was an heir to the original Kahless and the throne. Emperor Kahless II was installed soon afterwards.

=== Known Chancellors of the High Council ===
- Chancellor Mow'ga (2nd Empire; approximate Earth dates not known)
- Chancellor M'Rek (c. 2154)
- Chancellor L'Rell (2257-?)
- Chancellor Gorkon (?–2293) - Began the peace process with the Federation after the explosion of Praxis. Assassinated by Federation and Klingon officials opposed to the peace process. (Gorkon is the Chancellor at the start of Star Trek VI: The Undiscovered Country.)
- Chancellor Azetbur (2293–?) - The daughter of Gorkon, named Chancellor after Gorkon's assassination. She presided over the uncovering of the conspiracy against peace and the murder of her father, finally leading to détente with the Federation. Her appointment as Chancellor was almost unheard of in Klingon culture, because while there was largely no gender discrimination in the Klingon military, females were traditionally barred from serving on the High Council, let alone becoming Chancellor.
- Chancellor K'mpec (?–2367) - The longest serving Chancellor, who enlisted the Federation to oversee a rightful succession after he was poisoned by a rival.
- Chancellor Gowron (2367–2375) - His rise to power occurred during a civil war with the Romulan-backed Duras house. He presided over the bulk of the Dominion War, having launched an aggressive invasion of Cardassian space, believing Cardassia's new civilian government was infiltrated by Changeling spies. He withdrew from the Khitomer Accords and briefly ignited war with the Federation who came to Cardassia's defense, having known there were no Changelings in the Detapa Council. He restored the Accords to bolster the war effort against the Dominion, but his political opportunism quickly took hold and impeded the war effort. Killed in a duel with Worf, who proclaimed Martok the new Chancellor.
- Chancellor Martok (beginning 2375)
