= List of fictional extraterrestrial species and races: Z =

Name	Source	Type
Za'baby	Adventure Time: Fionna and Cake	
Zabrak	Star Wars	Alternative name for the humanoid Iridonian race whose most distinctive feature is the array of small horns on top of their heads. Their home planet is Iridonia, though they have established many colonies on planets throughout the galaxy. The most well known member is Darth Maul.
Zakdorns	Star Trek	The Zakdorn are a race native to the Alpha or Beta Quadrant. Zakdorn are humanoids with pouches of thick, fibrous tissue on their cheeks. They have three pouches per cheek.
Zaldans	Star Trek	
Zalkonians	Star Trek	
Zarbi	Doctor Who	
Zbornaks	Wander Over Yonder	A race resembling a horse that is actually more similar to a dinosaur; Sylvia is one of these.
Zebesians	Metroid series	
Zen Rigeln	Battlelords of the 23rd Century	Humanoid
Zen-Whoberis	Marvel Comics	Humanoid
Zenetan	Farscape	Humanoid
Zenn-Lavians	Marvel Comics	Humanoid
Zentradi	Macross, adapted as the Zentraedi in Robotech	Humanoid
Zetans	Fallout	
Zerg	StarCraft	Operating as a hive mind-linked "chain of command", the Zerg strive for "genetic perfection" by assimilating the unique genetic code of advanced species deemed "worthy" into their own gene pool, creating numerous variations of specialized strains of Zerg gifted with unique adaptations.
Zhodani	Traveller RPG	
Zin	Saints Row	
Zinoboppian	Melonpool	
Zirkonian	Aliens in the Attic	A race of knee-high hostile aliens from their home planet Zirkon/Zirkonia, bent on claiming other planets as their own.
Zisuili	Harry Turtledove's Worldwar series	A large stock animal native to Home and used by the Race as a foodstuff. Zisuili meat is also edible to humans. The Colonization Fleet brought zisuili and several other species of livestock to Tosev 3. As Earth plants were not equipped to deal with the extremely economic grazing patterns of these animals, some ecological damage resulted. This in turn led to diplomatic tensions between the Race the various human powers.
Zog	Renegade Legion	Humanoid
Zoni	Ratchet & Clank	Extradimensional energy-creatures. Can manipulate space and time. Have a hivemind, except for their leader, Orvus. Constructed and maintain the Great Clock.
Zoq-Fot-Pik	Star Control	
Zorgons	Sluggy Freelance	
Zorgons	Zathura	Cold-blooded reptiles that seek heat and matter to burn.
Zurg	Toy Story franchise	
Zygons	Doctor Who	Shape-shifting humanoid
Zyrgorkn	Hack RUN	Galaxy-dominating aliens destroying any other alien and human civilizations coming to existence that they find.
