= The House of Quark =

- Star Trek: Deep Space Nine episode
- Episode no.: Season 3 Episode 3
- Directed by: Les Landau
- Story by: Tom Benko
- Teleplay by: Ronald D. Moore
- Production code: 449
- Original air date: October 10, 1994

Guest appearances
- Max Grodénchik as Rom; Mary Kay Adams as Grilka; Robert O'Reilly as Gowron; Rosalind Chao as Keiko; Carlos Carrasco as D'Ghor; Joseph Ruskin as Tumek

Episode chronology
← Previous "The Search, Part II"	Next → "Equilibrium"
- Star Trek: Deep Space Nine season 3

"The House of Quark" is the 49th episode of the science fiction television series Star Trek: Deep Space Nine, the third episode of the third season.

Set in the 24th century, the series follows the adventures on the space station Deep Space Nine near the planet Bajor. Many episodes of the series focus on races such as the Ferengi, a species whose culture is dedicated to the pursuit of profit, and the Klingons, whose warrior culture emphasizes honor. In this episode, the Ferengi bartender Quark accidentally causes the death of a drunk Klingon, and ends up forcibly married to his widow.

This episode first aired on television on October 10, 1994.

== Plot ==
On a slow day at Quark's bar, Quark is assaulted by Kozak, a drunk and belligerent Klingon. During the scuffle, Kozak accidentally stabs himself and dies. Quark pretends to have slain Kozak in self-defense, attracting more customers to his bar with his newfound notoriety. Soon, a Klingon named D'Ghor, claiming to be Kozak's brother, accosts Quark in private and intimidates Quark into maintaining his lie, claiming an accidental death would dishonor his family.

Kozak's widow, Grilka, visits Quark's bar, extracts the truth from him, and abducts him to the Klingon homeworld, Qo'noS. Quark learns that Kozak left no male heir, leaving the House of Kozak leaderless since women are not normally allowed to lead a family. Had Kozak's death been ruled an accident, Grilka would have been granted special dispensation to take over the family, but because of Quark’s lies, everyone believes that Kozak died in combat. Furthermore, D'Ghor is not Kozak's brother, but is Kozak’s archenemy, to whom the House of Kozak is heavily in debt. In desperation, Grilka forcibly marries Quark, making him the new head of Kozak's family, which legally prevents D'Ghor from seizing her property.

After a rocky start, Quark and Grilka develop respect for one another. Quark inspects the family ledgers and discovers that for several years, D'Ghor has been using financial scams to weaken the House of Kozak's assets, which is dishonorable conduct for a Klingon. Quark exposes D'Ghor to the Klingon High Council. D'Ghor retaliates by exposing Quark's lie regarding the circumstances of Kozak's death, and challenges Quark to a duel to the death.

Quark tries to flee, but Grilka guilt-trips him into staying to face D'Ghor. At the duel, Quark throws his weapon to the ground, denouncing the duel as no better than an execution, since Quark has no chance of winning and there is no honor in killing an unarmed Ferengi. D’Ghor is happy to kill Quark anyway, but Chancellor Gowron, disgusted by D'Ghor's conduct, aborts the duel and banishes D'Ghor. Gowron rules that there are enough "unusual circumstances" to grant Grilka special dispensation to lead her House in her dead husband's stead. Grilka gratefully grants Quark a divorce.

In a side plot back on Deep Space Nine, Keiko O'Brien feels bored and useless after the closure of her school. Her husband Miles advises her to focus on her botanical career instead, and convinces her to go on a research expedition to Bajor.

== Production and writing ==
This episode was written by Tom Benko and Ronald D. Moore, and directed by Les Landau.

The concept for the episode started with Benko pitching an idea for Quark to get a reputation as a fighter after an altercation with a Klingon. Moore had a reputation among the writers for having a talent for Klingon episodes, after he worked on the Star Trek: The Next Generation episode "Sins of the Father". Finally, there was a longstanding desire to do a comedy episode with Klingons, and this was their chance.

The episode includes scenes set in the Great Hall, where the Klingon High Council meets. Producing this setting posed a budget challenge for the producer David Livingston. This was solved by building only half of the Great Hall set, and re-dressing the set between shots to show the other half of the hall.

== Reception ==
In 2012, the episode was reviewed by Zack Handlen for The A.V. Club, who found it surprisingly well-written for an episode focusing on Quark. Keith R.A. DeCandido, reviewing the episode for Tor.com in 2013, gave the episode a rating of nine out of ten, describing it as both "a good Ferengi episode" and "a good Klingon episode", with good intrigue and love stories.

In To Boldly Go: Essays on Gender and Identity in the Star Trek Universe, Zara T. Wilkinson praises the marriage of Miles and Keiko O'Brien as a well-written depiction of a healthy relationship, citing the O'Brien subplot in this episode as an example.

== Home media release ==
The episode was released on June 3, 2003 in North America as part of the Season 3 DVD box set. This episode was released in 2017 on DVD with the complete series box set, which had 176 episodes on 48 discs.

The episode was released with "Equilibrium" on a VHS cassette.

On July 6, 1999 it was released on LaserDisc in the United States, paired with "Equilibrium".
