= Masks (Star Trek: The Next Generation) =

- Star Trek: The Next Generation episode
- Episode no.: Season 7 Episode 17
- Directed by: Robert Wiemer
- Written by: Joe Menosky
- Production code: 269
- Original air date: February 21, 1994

Guest appearance
- Rickey D'Shon Collins - Eric Burton

Episode chronology
← Previous "Thine Own Self"	Next → "Eye of the Beholder"
- Star Trek: The Next Generation season 7

"Masks" is the seventeenth episode of the seventh season of the American science fiction television series Star Trek: The Next Generation, the 169th episode overall.

Set in the 24th century, the series follows the adventures of the Starfleet crew of the Federation starship Enterprise-D. In this episode, an alien archive, like an alien Library of Alexandria, initially appearing as a rogue comet because of accumulated matter, transforms the Enterprise as well as adapting Lieutenant Commander Data for a re-enactment of its culture's mythology, including the creation of two masks which are stylistically "a kind of cross between Venetian and Mayan."

== Plot ==
The Enterprise-D discovers a mysterious-looking rogue comet is that is determined to have been en route from a distant star system for 87 million years. The crew initiates a sensor scan of it and, eighteen hours later, Data creates a clay mask with a sun symbol identical to that seen on an artifact found in Deanna Troi's quarters and on Eric Burton's computer terminal, raising suspicions. It is discovered that the comet has been using the Enterprise scans as a carrier wave to send information back to the ship, which has caused icons that Data is somehow able to read to appear on the ship's computer and the creation of artifacts throughout the ship by the replicator systems. The crew find that an "incredible, huge, Mayan-esque, geometric piece of technology" was at the inner core of the former comet nucleus. Data believes that the object is an informational archive and is confined to his quarters when he starts to exhibit what is described as the equivalent of multiple personalities. Though initially the Enterprise continues to scan the Archive, hoping to determine how to reverse or stop the changes, bit by bit, the ship is being transformed, so the crew decide to attempt to destroy the Archive, only to be impeded by the changes. While Geordi searches for the Archive's transformation program, Captain Picard determines that they need to understand the meanings of the artifacts, and talks to the various personalities that Data exhibits to learn more.

Through Ihat, Picard learns that a queen called Masaka is waking, and that the only one that can talk to her is one called Korgano, a masculine figure. Ihat states that Masaka will only appear once Masaka's temple (the Queen's temple) has been built. The elder, another of the personalities exhibited by Data who is believed to be Masaka's father, provides Picard with the full version of the temple symbol, an icon that is used to create that temple. Inside the temple, they find the Masaka sun image paired with a horn symbol, which Picard guesses may be Korgano's moon symbol. Data puts on the mask he had created from clay with Masaka's sun symbol on it and escapes from his quarters, arriving at Masaka's temple, where he, now manifesting Masaka, sits down upon the throne. Masaka refuses to communicate with the merely mortal Picard. Desperate, Picard has Geordi input Korgano's moon symbol into the Archive's transformation program, which produces a silver mask with Korgano's moon symbol on its forehead. Picard decides to wear the Korgano mask in order to pose as Korgano and confront the Masaka personality. In the character of Korgano, Picard convinces Masaka to sleep so that she and Korgano can continue their "hunt" another day. With the Masaka personality asleep, all the changes aboard the Enterprise are reverted, and Data finds himself back to normal. Geordi manages to disable the archive's transformation program. Picard comments that Data has, briefly, contained personalities encompassing the inhabitants of an entire civilization, and as such he has had an experience that "transcends the human condition."

== Reception ==
The episode has been described as "incomprehensible, impenetrable, and incoherent." Empire magazine declared "Masks" its choice as worst episode of the entire Star Trek: The Next Generation series. Technically, it was chosen as second-worst, but Empire decided that "Shades of Gray"—its initial choice for worst episode—did not count, because "Shades of Gray" was a flashback 'clip' episode.

The 2008 book Computers Of Star Trek suggested that what was in the comet and began converting the spacecraft, was a kind of trojan-horse software program left by the D'Arsay aliens. The Religions Of Star Trek notes that the masks are the core drama of this episode, relating to a theme of things being hidden and then revealed.

In 2014, Ars Technica described it as one of the bad episodes of the seventh season, but praised it for "let[ting] Brent Spiner play around and have some fun."

In 2019, Screen Rant ranked "Masks" the tenth worst episode of Star Trek: The Next Generation based on IMDB ratings; they reported that it was 6.1 out of 10 at that time.

== Video releases ==
This was released in Japan on LaserDisc on October 9, 1998 as part of the half-season collection Log.14: Seventh Season Part.2. This set included episodes from "Lower Decks" to Part II of "All Good Things", with English and Japanese audio tracks.

== Notes ==
- While the comet is being described as a "rogue comet" (which means not bound to any one star system) the on-screen graphic shows it being in an elliptical orbit. However, it is not clear if there was an established scientific use for this term, prior to its use on Star Trek. The first rogue planet was not discovered until 2012.
- Comparison has been drawn between the hunt of Masaka and Korgano and the depiction of the birth of Athena at the Parthenon. Athena was born at dawn, and to symbolize this, the horses of Helios are depicted as vigorous and full of energy, ready to pull the Sun across the sky, whereas the horses of Selene, who have been pulling the Moon across the sky all night, seem fatigued and labored.
- On the "Inside of You with Michael Rosenbaum" podcast, Spiner described how being given no time at all to prepare for playing five different roles resulted in "some of the most preposterous acting you've ever seen in your life... the other actors were laughing in my face."

== See also ==
- Comets in fiction
- The Sun in culture
- Human sacrifice
