= Talarian =

Talarian Corporation
- Type: Acquired by TIBCO in 2002
- Industry: Computer Software
- Founded: 1989
- Headquarters: Los Altos, CA
- Key people: Tom Laffey, co-founder, Paul A. Larson, President & Chief Executive, Michael A. Morgan, Vice President Finance & Chief Financial Officer
- Products: Middleware
- Revenue: US $14.5M (2001)
- Number of employees: 100 (1997)

Talarian was a provider of real-time infrastructure software. Now part of TIBCO, it was a veteran provider of message-oriented middleware.

Talarian was a member of the Business Integration Group (BIG), the Internet Protocol Multicast Initiative (IPMI), the Securities Industry Middleware Council (SIMC), the Object Management Group (OMG), and the Internet Engineering Task Force (IETF).

== SmartSockets ==
SmartSockets was the main product of Talarian. It is a real-time message-oriented middleware (MOM) which is scalable and fault tolerant. Its programming model is built specifically to offer high-speed interprocess communication (IPC) for multiprocessor architecture, scalability and reliability.

It supports a variety of communication paradigms including publish-subscribe, adaptive multicast, redundant connections, peer-to-peer, and RPC.

Included as part of the SmartSockets package are graphical tools for monitoring and debugging applications.

It is supported on a wide range of platforms:

- HP-UX
- AIX
- Linux
- Compaq NSK/OSS
- Tru64
- OpenVMS
- Windows
- Solaris
- Irix
- VxWorks

Applications using SmartSockets can be developed with the following languages:

- C API
- C++ Class Libraries
- ActiveX Components
- Java Class Library

SmartSockets is now a product of TIBCO. See acquisition below.

== Acquisition by TIBCO ==
In January 2002 TIBCO acquired Talarian for approximately $115 million. It was its primary competitor in the delivery of high-performance messaging solutions.

TIBCO paid $5.30 per share, half in stock and half in cash, for each of Talarian's outstanding shares.

== Customers ==
Talarian customers were large end-users, OEMs and systems integrators in need of solutions where real-time data flow supports high-information volumes.

List of Famous Customers:

- Boeing
- AT&T
- Hewlett-Packard
- Cisco
- MTR
- New York Stock Exchange
- NASA's ground control station for the Hubble Space Telescope
