= Reunion (Star Trek: The Next Generation) =

- Star Trek: The Next Generation episode
- Episode no.: Season 4 Episode 7
- Directed by: Jonathan Frakes
- Story by: Drew Deighan; Thomas Perry; Jo Perry
- Teleplay by: Thomas Perry; Jo Perry; Ronald D. Moore; Brannon Braga
- Cinematography by: Marvin Rush
- Production code: 181
- Original air date: November 5, 1990

Guest appearances
- Suzie Plakson - K'Ehleyr; Robert O'Reilly - Gowron; Patrick Massett - Duras; Charles Cooper - K'mpec; Jon Paul Steuer - Alexander Rozhenko; Michael Rider - Security Guard; April Grace - Transporter Technician; Basil Wallace - Klingon Guard #1; Mirron E. Willis - Klingon Guard #2

Episode chronology
← Previous "Legacy"	Next → "Future Imperfect"
- Star Trek: The Next Generation season 4

"Reunion" is the 81st episode of the syndicated American science fiction television series Star Trek: The Next Generation. It is the seventh episode of the fourth season.

Set in the 24th century, the series follows the adventures of the Starfleet crew of the Federation starship Enterprise-D. In this episode, ambassador K'Ehleyr returns to the Enterprise to advise Captain Picard, who has been chosen as a neutral party to arbitrate the selection of the new Klingon leader from two candidates, Gowron and Duras, one of whom is suspected to be a traitor.

== Plot ==
The starship Enterprise is met by a Klingon battlecruiser carrying Ambassador K'Ehleyr (Suzie Plakson) and Klingon Chancellor K'mpec (Charles Cooper). K'mpec reveals to Captain Picard that he has been poisoned and is slowly dying, and insists that Picard become the Arbiter of Succession and identify his assassin. He suspects that it is either Gowron (Robert O'Reilly) or Duras (Patrick Massett), the two challengers for his succession, and warns Picard that allowing a Klingon dishonorable enough to use poison to become chancellor could result in war between the Klingon Empire and the Federation.

K'Ehleyr, a former lover of Lt. Worf (Michael Dorn), brings with her a young three quarters-Klingon boy (Jon Paul Steuer), Alexander. She confirms to Worf that the boy is his son, explaining she hid him from Worf in fear that Worf would insist on marrying her. Worf is troubled by Alexander's lack of interest in becoming a warrior but, already burdened by his discommendation, fears for Alexander's future, given the stigma of his family name.

When K'mpec dies, Gowron and Duras arrive for the Rites of Succession. During the first Rite, a ceremony verifying K'mpec's death, a bomb detonates in the assembly hall, killing two Klingons. Picard decides to prolong the Rites using an archaic ceremony to give the Enterprise crew time to complete a forensic analysis. They discover that the explosion came from a Romulan bomb worn by one of Duras' guards.

K'Ehleyr investigates Worf's discommendation and infers the truth: Duras framed Worf's father for complicity in a Romulan massacre of Klingons, in order to cover up his own father's involvement. Duras discovers her investigation, confronts her, and kills her. Worf challenges Duras to combat under the Right of Vengeance; Duras initially rejects the challenge, but accepts it when Worf claims K'Ehleyr was his mate. The Enterprise crew arrive too late to prevent Worf from killing Duras in combat.

After the Klingons leave, Picard reprimands Worf for killing Duras, although Worf defends his actions as valid under Klingon law. Though Duras's death means that there is no longer any reason to hide the truth of the massacre, Worf explains to Picard that the High Council will not admit their error in punishing him and vows he and his brother will convince them to speak the truth. Worf acknowledges Alexander as his son, and places the boy in the care of his adoptive parents Sergey and Helena Rozhenko.

== Production ==
This episode introduced a new Klingon spacecraft to the Star Trek franchise, the Vor'cha-class attack cruiser. It was designed by Rick Sternbach, and the model was built by Greg Jein. This episode also saw the first appearance of the character Gowron, played by Robert O'Reilly, who would appear in subsequent episodes of both The Next Generation and Deep Space Nine.

The bat'leth prop, a Klingon weapon, was designed by special effects producer Dan Curry for this episode. The bat'leth has since appeared throughout the Star Trek franchise.

== Reception ==
In 2016, the story of K'Ehleyr in "Reunion" was noted as one of the saddest conclusions in Star Trek franchise. In 2017, Den of Geek ranked Suzie Plakson's role as K'Ehleyr as one of the top ten guest stars on Star Trek: The Next Generation, noting her performance in this episode and earlier episode which introduced the character, "The Emissary".

In 2017, Den of Geek ranked this episode as one of top 25 "must watch" episodes of Star Trek: The Next Generation.

In 2017, Comic Book Resources ranked Worf and K'Ehleyr as the ninth best romantic relationship of the Star Trek franchise up to that time, noting their introduction in the previous episode "The Emissary". They note that in this episode she returns with Worf's son, but is killed by Duras.

Keith R. A. DeCandido of Tor.com rated the episode ten out of ten. Zach Handlen of The A.V. Club gave the episode a grade of B+.

== Legacy ==
K'Ehleyr was suggested as the inspiration for later Star Trek main cast character B'Elanna Torres. In terms of the continuity in the show, it provides an origin story for Worf's son Alexander.

The episode introduced the bat'leth to the series, which became the iconic weapon of the Klingons.

== Releases ==
"Reunion" was released in the United States on September 3, 2002, as part of the Star Trek: The Next Generation Season 4 season four DVD box set.

== See also ==
- "The Emissary", the second season episode where Worf and K'Ehleyr meet again after six years.
- "Sins of the Father", the third season episode where Worf and Duras first meet.
- "Redemption", Parts I & II, the sequel to "Reunion".
