= Sins of the Father (Star Trek: The Next Generation) =

- Star Trek: The Next Generation episode
- Episode no.: Season 3 Episode 17
- Directed by: Les Landau
- Story by: Drew Deighan
- Teleplay by: Ronald D. Moore; W. Reed Moran
- Production code: 165
- Original air date: March 19, 1990

Guest appearances
- Charles Cooper as K'mpec; Tony Todd as Kurn; Patrick Massett as Duras; Thelma Lee as Kahlest; Teddy Davies as Transporter Tech

Episode chronology
← Previous "The Offspring"	Next → "Allegiance"
- Star Trek: The Next Generation season 3

"Sins of the Father" is the 65th episode of the American science fiction television series Star Trek: The Next Generation and the 17th episode of the third season.

Set in the 24th century, the series follows the adventures of the Starfleet crew of the Federation starship Enterprise-D. In this episode, the Enterprise's Klingon Chief of Security, Lt. Worf, challenges the Klingon High Council's accusation that his father was a traitor.

This is the first of four appearances of Worf's brother Kurn, each played by actor Tony Todd, in the Star Trek franchise; Kurn last appears on the series Star Trek: Deep Space Nine in the episode "Sons of Mogh" (broadcast February 12, 1996).

== Plot ==
As part of the Federation-Klingon officer exchange program, Klingon Commander Kurn asks to serve aboard the Enterprise as first officer. His command style aggravates the crew. Lieutenant Worf confronts Kurn, who reveals he is Worf's younger brother: when Worf traveled as a child to the planet Khitomer with his parents, Kurn was left with Lorgh, a friend of their father Mogh; after their parents were killed in a massacre by the Romulans, Kurn was raised as Lorgh's son. Mogh is being charged posthumously as a traitor by Duras, the son of Mogh's rival, for colluding with the Romulans in the Khitomer massacre. Worf requests a leave of absence to defend his father's honor. Captain Picard believes Worf's actions as a Starfleet officer in his father's defense will be of significant interest to the Federation and directs the Enterprise to the Klingon capital. Kurn volunteers to stand with Worf as his second; Worf warns Kurn not to reveal his parentage, lest he be punished for Mogh's alleged dishonor.

At the High Council, Duras reveals evidence of Mogh sending Khitomer's defense codes to the Romulans. Picard orders his crew to examine the evidence. K'mpec, the Klingon Chancellor, privately urges Worf to drop the challenge. Duras ambushes Kurn, aware of his bloodline, and attempts to get him to betray Worf. Kurn, wounded in the ensuing fight, is now unable to support Worf; Picard takes his place.

The Enterprise crew discovers that the Khitomer logs were modified and find another survivor of the massacre, Worf's nurse Kahlest. Picard convinces Kahlest, who knows Mogh was loyal to the Klingon Empire, to help. Picard brings Kahlest to testify, bluffing that she knows who the true traitor was. K'mpec calls Worf, Picard, Duras and Kahlest into his office and reveals the truth: Duras's father was the traitor, but due to the House of Duras' influence over some of the council, exposing this would lead to civil war. The Council accepted Duras's charge of treason believing Worf would not challenge it. K'mpec imparts that the Council will condemn Worf and Kurn, but Picard claims this injustice could end the Klingon-Federation alliance. Worf accepts a discommendation, tantamount to admitting his father's guilt; the knowledge of the proceedings, including Kurn's relationship to Mogh, will be undisclosed. In the council, the assembled Klingons, including Kurn, turn their backs on the disgraced Worf as he and Picard leave the hall.

== Production ==
This episode has the Klingon Great Hall designed by Richard James; the Great Hall and others sets won an Emmy for Best Art Design for this episode. The view of the Great Hall exterior view was done by a matte painting.

== Reception ==
This episode won an Emmy award for Best Art Design.

Zack Handlen of The A.V. Club gave the episode a B+ grade. Keith DeCandido of Tor.com rated the episode eight out of ten.

The episode ranked seventh in Entertainment Weekly's list of top ten Star Trek: The Next Generation episodes. In 2017, Den of Geek included "Sins of the Father" as one of their 25 recommended episodes of Star Trek: The Next Generation. Also in 2017, The Daily Dot recommended this as a Star Trek Klingon themed episode to prepare for Star Trek: Discovery.

In 2017, Nerdist ranked "Sins of the Father" the ninth best episode of Star Trek: The Next Generation.

In 2019, Screen Rant ranked "Sins of the Father" the second best episode of Star Trek: The Next Generation. In 2020, Screen Rant again ranked it the second best episode, noting it explores the Klingon culture, Worf (played by Michael Dorn), and the concept of honor and politics.

In 2021, Cinema Blend ranked this one of the top ten episodes of TNG. They note this episode helps establish background on the Klingons, and its plot is harnessed by later episodes.

== Releases ==
The episode was released with Star Trek: The Next Generation season three DVD box set, released in the United States on July 2, 2002. This had 26 episodes of Season 3 on seven discs, with a Dolby Digital 5.1 audio track. It was released in high-definition Blu-ray in the United States on April 30, 2013.

The episode is one of three chosen for Paramount's "The Next Level" Blu-ray sampler. During the high definition (HD) remastering process a 13-second portion of the episode had to be upconverted from a standard definition source as the original 35 mm elements could not be located. This footage was later located and remastered in HD for the third season Blu-ray set.

== See also ==
- Sins of the Father (disambiguation)
