= Stanley Adams (actor) =

American actor and screenwriter (1915–1977)

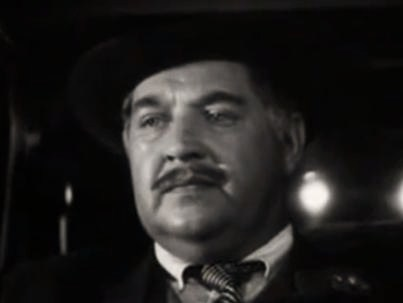
- Adams in High School Big Shot (1959)
- Born: Stanley Abramowitz; April 7, 1915; New York City, U.S.
- Died: April 27, 1977 (aged 62); Santa Monica, California, U.S.
- Occupations: Actor; screenwriter
- Years active: 1951–1977
- Spouse: Florence Harriette Fellner (m. 1941; div. 1973)
- Children: 2

Stanley Adams (born Stanley Abramowitz; April 7, 1915 – April 27, 1977) was an American actor and screenwriter. He appeared in several films, including Breakfast at Tiffany's (1961) and Lilies of the Field (1963). On television, he is probably best known for his guest appearance in the 1967 Star Trek: The Original Series episode "The Trouble with Tribbles" and the 1973 Star Trek: The Animated Series episode "More Tribbles, More Troubles" in which he portrayed outer space peddler Cyrano Jones, purveyor of tribbles. Concurrent with his acting career, Adams also maintained a career as a freelance television scriptwriter from the mid-1950s through the early 70s, writing for shows such as It's Always Jan, Mister Ed, Dr. Kildare, Bonanza, Gunsmoke, Star Trek, The Outsider, The Flying Nun, Mannix, The Name of the Game, and others. Although he did appear in guest roles in many of these series, Adams generally did not appear as an actor in episodes he wrote.

== Early life ==
Adams was born in New York City. He had his first film role playing the bartender in the movie version of Death of a Salesman (1951). He played another barkeep in The Gene Krupa Story and a safecracker in Roger Corman's High School Big Shot (1959).

== Career ==
Adams had a lengthy career as a character actor, often playing comic, pompous characters.

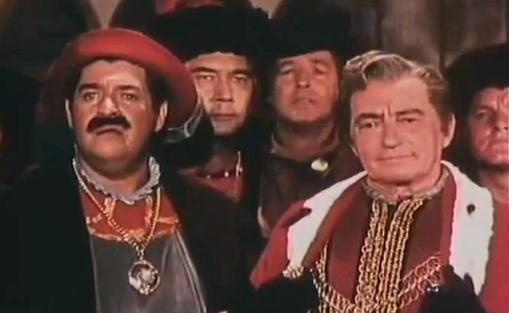
Adams (left) with Claude Rains in the 1957 television musical The Pied Piper of Hamelin

Adams played Otis Campbell's brother Ralph on an episode of The Andy Griffith Show. Otis was afraid Ralph would find out he was the town drunk, then learned Ralph was the town drunk of his home town. His 1959 portrayal of Chicago gangster/gambler Nick Popolous in Mr. Lucky ("That Stands For Pool") is especially good as he deftly shifts from bumpkin to killer multiple times.

He appeared in an episode of The Tab Hunter Show in 1961. His other roles on TV shows include roles in six episodes of Wagon Train (including S8 E26 as Samuel in "The Jarbo Pierce Story" 1965) and three episodes of Gunsmoke. He played political boss Frank Templeton in the final episode of McHale's Navy (1962–1966) "Wally for Congress." He played a realtor on The Dick Van Dyke Show episode "Your Home Sweet Home Is My Home Sweet Home". He had two roles in the syndicated western series Death Valley Days in the episodes "The Holy Terror" (1963) and "The Lady and the Sourdough" (1966). In 1967, he appeared in an episode of The Lucy Show titled "Lucy the Fight Manager" as a trainer named Louie. He appeared as King Kaliwani in the final episode of Gilligan's Island, and as Captain Courageous in two episodes of the 1960s Batman TV series ("Catwoman Goes to College"/"Batman Displays his Knowledge"). He also played notorious pool shark "Sure Shot" Wilson on the ABC sitcom The Odd Couple .

In genre television he appeared on The Twilight Zone as a time-traveling scientist—opposite Buster Keaton—in "Once Upon a Time" and as a bartender ("Mr Garrity and the Graves"), and as Ilya Klarpe on The Addams Family (1964). In science fiction television circles he is known primarily for two roles, as Tybo the anthropomorphic carrot in the penultimate episode of Lost in Space, "The Great Vegetable Rebellion" (1968), and for playing Cyrano Jones in "The Trouble with Tribbles" (1967) episode of Star Trek. He reprised (as a voice actor) Cyrano Jones in the Star Trek: The Animated Series episode "More Tribbles, More Troubles" and archival footage of Adams as Jones was later featured in the Star Trek: Deep Space Nine episode "Trials and Tribble-ations" (1996). He also co-wrote an episode for Star Trek's final season, "The Mark of Gideon".

Adams also had a lengthy theatrical motion picture career. In the 1962 theatrical film adaptation of Rod Serling's teleplay Requiem for a Heavyweight he played the supporting role of Perelli, a sleazy promoter who offers a washed-up boxer a degrading job as a professional wrestler, a role which he reprised; in 1956, he played the part in the original Playhouse 90 production. He played the Chicano café owner in Lilies of the Field and portrayed Rutherford "Rusty" Trawler, "the 9th richest man in America under 50" in the Audrey Hepburn film Breakfast at Tiffany's. He appeared as Stanley in the 1966 television film Death of a Salesman. He played Bernie the foulmouthed caller in the 1974 action/adventure movie Act of Vengeance.

== Death ==
Adams committed suicide with a .22 caliber pistol on April 27, 1977, at the age of 62. A note indicated that he had grown despondent thanks to chronic pain from a back injury. He was cremated at Angelus-Rosedale Cemetery. His ashes were scattered in the Pacific Ocean. He left behind an ex-wife, a son and a daughter.

== Selected filmography ==
- The Atomic Kid (1954) - Wildcat Hooper
- Hell's Horizon (1955) - Dixie
- The Fighting Chance (1955) - Piggie (uncredited)
- Hell on Frisco Bay (1956) - Hammy
- Inside Detroit (1956) - Harry (uncredited)
- The Killer Is Loose (1956) - Honor Farm Guard (uncredited)
- The Bold and the Brave (1956) - Master Sergeant
- Somebody Up There Likes Me (1956) - Romolo's Attorney (uncredited)
- Calling Homicide (1956) - Peter von Elda (uncredited)
- Trooper Hook (1957) - Heathcliff
- Valerie (1957) - Dr. Jackson
- Black Patch (1957) - Professor Dudley, Drummer
- Hell Bound (1957) - Herbert Fay Jr.
- Hell Ship Mutiny (1957) - Roxy
- I Married a Woman (1958) - Cabbie (uncredited)
- Saddle the Wind (1958) - Joe, Bartender (uncredited)
- High School Big Shot (1959) - Harry March
- North by Northwest (1959) - Lieutenant Harding (uncredited)
- The Gene Krupa Story (1959) - Bar Owner (uncredited)
- The Gazebo (1959) - Dan Shelby (voice, uncredited)
- Alfred Hitchcock Presents (1960) (Season 6 Episode 6: "Pen Pal") - Detective Berger
- One Foot in Hell (1960) - Pete (uncredited)
- The Rat Race (1960) - Cab Driver (uncredited)
- Studs Lonigan (1960) - Gangster (uncredited)
- North to Alaska (1960) - Breezy
- The Wizard of Baghdad (1960) - Warden Kvetch
- The Young Savages (1961) - Police Lieutenant Hardy (uncredited)
- Pirates of Tortuga (1961) - Captain Montbars
- Breakfast at Tiffany's (1961) - Rusty Trawler
- The Errand Boy (1961) - Grumpy
- The Outsider (1961) - Noomie
- 13 West Street (1962) - Finney
- Have Gun Will Travel (1962) - Caleb Musgrove
- Requiem for a Heavyweight (1962) - Perelli
- Critic's Choice (1963) - Bartender
- Lilies of the Field (1963) - Juan
- Wild and Wonderful (1964) - Mayor of Man La Loquet
- Looking for Love (1964) - Employment Service Official (uncredited)
- A House Is Not a Home (1964) - Harry
- Fate Is the Hunter (1964) - Bernie (uncredited)
- Ship of Fools (1965) - Professor Hutten
- Your Home Sweet Home Is My Home (1965) - Jack Parkly
- When the Boys Meet the Girls (1965) - Lank
- Death of a Salesman (1966) – Stanley
- Nevada Smith (1966) - Storekeeper
- Thunder Alley (1967) - Mac Lunsford
- Double Trouble (1967) - Captain Roach
- Massacre Harbor (1968) - El Gamil (this consists of three episodes of the TV series The Rat Patrol - 'The Last Harbor Raid' parts I, II & III - released as a film)
- The Grasshopper (1970) - Buddy Miller
- Move (1970) - New Tenant
- The Seven Minutes (1971) - Irwin Blair
- Machismo: 40 Graves for 40 Guns (1971) - Granger
- Everything You Always Wanted to Know About Sex* (*But Were Afraid to Ask) (1972) - Stomach Operator
- Another Nice Mess (1972) - President of Persia
- California Country (1973) - Grandpa Boomer
- The Clones (1973) - Carl Swafford
- Act of Vengeance (1974) - Bernie / Foul Mouth
- Dixie Dynamite (1976) - Dade McCrutchen
- Woman in the Rain (1976) - Noodles
- The Great Gundown (1977) - Buck (final film role)

== Television ==
Year	Title	Role	Notes
1956	Playhouse 90	Pirelli	"Requiem for a Heavyweight"
1959	Mr. Lucky	Nick Popolous	Season 1, Episode 5; "That Stands for Pool"
1960	Rawhide	Creston	Season 2, Episode 12; "Incident of the Druid Curse"
1960	Bachelor Father	Sam Humber	Season 4, Episode 1; Jasper the Second
1961	The Tab Hunter Show		
1961–1964	The Twilight Zone	Rollo/Jensen	Season 3, Episode 13; "Once Upon a Time" and Season 5, Episode 32; "Mr. Garrity and the Graves"
1962	The Rifleman	Dr. Jay Carter	Season 4, Episode 31; "Outlaw's Shoes"
1962	The Andy Griffith Show	Ralph Campbell	Season 2, Episode 31; "Deputy Otis"
1964	The Addams Family	Ila Klarpe	Season 1, Episode 11; "The Addams Family Meets the VIPs"
1964	Bonanza	Sheriff Tate	Season 5, Episode 23; "The Pure Truth"
1965	The Dick Van Dyke Show	Real Estate Agent	Season 4, Episode 25; "Your Home Sweet Home Is My Home Sweet Home"
1966	McHale's Navy	Frank Templeton	Season 4, Episode 30; "Wally for Congress"
1967	The Lucy Show	Louie	Season 5, Episode 20; "Lucy the Fight Manager"
1967	Batman	Captain Courageous	Season 2, Episode 49; "Catwoman Goes to College and Season 2, Episode 50; "Batman Displays His Knowledge" (two-part story arc)
1967	Gilligan's Island	King Killiwani	Season 3, Episode 30; "Gilligan, the Goddess"
1967	Star Trek	Cyrano Jones	Season 2, Episode 15; "The Trouble with Tribbles"
1968	Lost in Space	Tybo	Season 3, Episode 23; "The Great Vegetable Rebellion"
1971	Love Hate Love	Wally	ABC Movie of the Week
1972	Every Man Needs One	Bus driver	ABC Movie of the Week
1973	Star Trek: The Animated Series	Cyrano Jones	Season 1, Episode 5; "More Tribbles, More Troubles"
1973	The Odd Couple	Sure-Shot Wilson	Season 3, Episode 18; "The Hustler"
1974	Emergency!	Man with heart attack	Season 4, Episode 13; "Parade"
1996	Star Trek: Deep Space Nine	Cyrano Jones	Season 5, Episode 6; "Trials and Tribble-ations" (appeared only in archival footage from 1967 Star Trek appearance)
