= The Magicks of Megas-tu =

- Star Trek: The Animated Series episode
- Episode no.: Season 1 Episode 8
- Directed by: Hal Sutherland
- Written by: Larry Brody
- Production code: 22009
- Original air date: October 27, 1973

Episode chronology
← Previous "The Infinite Vulcan"	Next → "Once Upon a Planet"

"The Magicks of Megas-tu" is the eighth episode of the first season of the American animated science fiction television series Star Trek: The Animated Series. It first aired on NBC on October 27, 1973, and was written by Larry Brody, who had originally pitched the idea for the third season of Star Trek: The Original Series. However, according to Brody the dialogue was mostly re-written by series creator Gene Roddenberry.

Set in the 23rd century, the series follows the adventures of Captain James T. Kirk (voiced by William Shatner) and the crew of the Starfleet starship Enterprise. In this episode, while exploring the center of the galaxy, the crew of the Enterprise are transported by an alien named Lucien to the planet Megas-Tu, where magic and witchcraft are normal. Kirk and the crew are placed on trial by the inhabitants in response to the Salem Witch Trials.

The original pitch by Brody featured God rather than the Devil, but this was changed after the idea was rejected by NBC executives. Critics have written positively about the episode, praising the design work for the magical effects. It was compared to The Original Series episode "Plato's Stepchildren", but was thought to be an improvement. Following the broadcast, a novelization of "The Magicks of Megas-tu" was created by Alan Dean Foster, and it has been released on a variety of home media formats.

== Plot ==
While exploring near the center of the galaxy, the Federation starship USS Enterprise is caught inside an energy/matter vortex and its computer systems fail. A being named Lucien appears on the bridge, repairs the ship's systems and takes the crew to explore his planet, Megas-Tu, on which differing physical laws allow the existence of magic and witchcraft. Suddenly fearful at the approach of other Megans, Lucien teleports the crew back onto the Enterprise to prevent their discovery.

While waiting, the Enterprise crew experiment with using magic. Lucien warns the crew that their experiments will draw unwanted attention, but it is too late. The Enterprise crew are transported to what appears to be Salem during a witch trial in 1691. The Megans are an ageless species that, at one time, lived on Earth. Contrary to modern assumption, those executed during the witch trials were all real witches, which was how the Megans were driven from Earth. The Megans put humanity and the Enterprise crew on trial for what humans did to their people. Captain Kirk testifies that humanity has progressed since 1691. On examining their ship's records, the Megans conclude that the Enterprise coming to Megas-Tu was a freak accident and they need not fear human incursion. However, Lucien is condemned to eternal isolation for bringing humans to the Megans' world.

Kirk argues that this is unreasonably cruel punishment in the case of Lucien, who alone among the Megans sought out humans for companionship. The Megans claim Lucien is Lucifer, but Kirk only scoffs at this, as he does not believe in the historicity of Christian traditions, and engages the Megans in a magical battle to determine Lucien's fate. The Megans then reveal that their threat to punish Lucien was only a test to determine if humanity had truly changed. On the basis of Kirk's compassion, they would welcome future human visits to their planet. They return the Enterprise to its native universe.

== Production ==
In 1969, writer Larry Brody pitched a number of story ideas for the third season of Star Trek: The Original Series. He was unsure about how far these stories ideas were taken through the production team, and whether or not series creator Gene Roddenberry had ever seen them. Amongst the ideas was the plot that later became "The Magicks of Megas-tu". Three years later in 1972, Brody was invited by producer D.C. Fontana to pitch ideas for an episode of Star Trek: The Animated Series. When he arrived to pitch to Fontana, she instead ushered him into a room with Roddenberry. The Star Trek creator was pleased with the idea for "The Magicks of Megas-tu", saying that they had tried to do a magic based episode ("Catspaw") in the second season of The Original Series but he was unsatisfied with the effects due to the budgetary constraints.

At this point the plot concerned the crew of the Enterprise coming across God in space, something which Roddenberry had previously wanted to include in The Original Series but it had been turned down by NBC Primetime's executives. He thought that such an idea might be palatable to the Daytime executives instead. Roddenberry felt that such an episode would work better in animated form and asked Brody to work up a full script. Brody returned home and started work on the script immediately, wanting to improve it far beyond the point that he had developed when he pitched it for The Original Series.

Roddenberry took the God idea to the NBC executives, who were concerned with the "blinding flash of light" representing God. They rejected the inclusion of God, and the production crew realized that they needed to move the episode in the direction of magic rather than religion. Brody re-wrote the story to include the Devil instead of God. The script went through several re-writes, with Fontana and Brody meeting to discuss the changes that Roddenberry had requested. Brody later regretted not speaking to Roddenberry directly, as at times he didn't understand what changes he was being asked to make. Fontana was aware of the controversial content of the episode, and later said that some people felt that "The Magicks of Megas-tu" dealt with the Devil sympathetically, but believed that it was good.

Following the submission of the script, Roddenberry re-wrote the dialogue to the extent that Brody did not recognise any of it when he received the final version. However, Brody's name remained credited on it. Afterwards, he was invited to attend the cast recording session for the episode, where he met the actors including Shatner and Nimoy. "The Magicks of Megas-tu" was one of two episodes of The Animated Series previously pitched for live-action Star Trek, the other being David Gerrold's "More Tribbles, More Troubles". Brody later wrote the episode "Tattoo" for the second season of Star Trek: Voyager.

== Reception and home media release ==
"The Magicks of Megas-tu" was first broadcast on NBC on October 27, 1973. Mark A. Altman and Edward Gross, in their book Trek Navigator (1998), consider "The Magicks of Megas-tu" to be one of the best animated episodes. They explained that while it was quite ambitious and heady for a Saturday morning children's program, "it's somehow appropriate that Star Trek is able to pull it off successfully." They compared this episode to the live action Star Trek episode "Plato's Stepchildren" where Kirk and his crew also gain superpowers, saying it was "a better episode, as Kirk pleads humanity's case to the Megans." They highlighted that the episode depicts Kirk successfully defending Lucifer from banishment and noting that he will not fall prey to legendary superstitions. They gave the episode three out of four stars.

In his column "One Trek Mind" for the official Star Trek website, published in December 2014, Jordan Hoffman described the episode as "quite beautiful to look at" but also the "weirdest" episode of the franchise. Hoffman said that the magical battle between Kirk and the Megan prosecutor was "indescribable", and compared one scene to having Kirk "trapped inside a giant wrapper of Fruit Stripe gum". He thought that the revelation of Lucien as the Devil and the punchline ending to the episode could not be repeated in modern television.

In January 2014, Witney Seibold when writing for CraveOnline, said that "The Magicks of Megas-tu" was the best episode of The Animated Series. Seibold said that it opened up a number of questions, such as "Does the most evil creature in existence deserve rights as an individual?", and added that the action sequence where Captain Kirk fires lightning out of his hands was "really cool". However, Michelle Erica Green in her March 2011 review for TrekNation described the episode as so bad that she thought fans only watched it to play drinking games. Following her review, she planned to return to pretending that the "terrible" "The Magicks of Megas-tu" never existed at all.

The episode was expanded by Alan Dean Foster in the novel Star Trek: Log 3 alongside the episodes "Once Upon a Planet" and "Mudd's Passion". "The Magicks of Megas-tu" was released on LaserDisc as part of the series set. The first release of Star Trek: The Animated Series on DVD was through fan made productions. The official DVD release was on November 21, 2006 in the United States, which was a single release containing all episodes from both seasons of the television show.
