= The Infinite Vulcan =

- Star Trek: The Animated Series episode
- Episode no.: Season 1 Episode 7
- Directed by: Hal Sutherland
- Written by: Walter Koenig
- Original air date: October 20, 1973

Episode chronology
← Previous "The Survivor"	Next → "The Magicks of Megas-tu"

"The Infinite Vulcan" is the seventh episode of the first season of the American animated science fiction television series Star Trek: The Animated Series. It first aired on NBC on October 20, 1973, and was written by Original Series cast member Walter Koenig. It was the actor's only involvement in the series, as he had not been hired to voice Pavel Chekov in the animated version due to budgetary limitations. With "The Infinite Vulcan", Koenig became the first member of the Star Trek cast to write an episode for the franchise. As with the rest of the first season, the episode was directed by Hal Sutherland.

Set in the 23rd century, the series follows the adventures of Captain James T. Kirk (voiced by William Shatner) and the crew of the Starfleet starship Enterprise. In this episode, the crew visit a planet inhabited by plant-based lifeforms and must save the life of Science Officer Spock (voiced by Leonard Nimoy) after he is abducted by a giant clone of Dr. Stavos Keniclius (voiced by James Doohan).

Koenig was hired to write the script after some of his work was passed from Susan Sackett to series creator Gene Roddenberry. Koenig found the writing process for the episode was not enjoyable, due to the number of re-writes required. Further additions were made by Roddenberry, including talking vegetables as characters. When the producers offered him a second episode, Koenig turned it down. "The Infinite Vulcan" received a mixed reception from critics, who suggested that the writing could have been better, but others included it in lists of the best episodes of The Animated Series.

== Plot ==
While exploring the newly discovered planet Phylos for possible Federation colonization, Lt. Sulu picks up a walking plant, called a Retlaw, and is poisoned by a stinger. The plantlike alien beings who inhabit the planet approach the Enterprise landing party and their leader, Agmar, saves Sulu's life. The Phylosians say they were nearly wiped out by a mild terrestrial disease that was brought to the planet by Dr. Stavos Keniclius, a Terran scientist who survived Earth's Eugenics Wars.

A giant clone of Keniclius, named Keniclius Five, kidnaps First Officer Spock. Keniclius has survived through the centuries by periodically transferring his consciousness into a new, more advanced clone body. He believes the galaxy is as war-ravaged as Earth was when he left it. He plans to enforce peace on the galaxy with the aid of a fleet of Phylosian ships and a giant clone of Spock that he's created by transferring Spock's consciousness into it, leaving Spock's original body a mindless shell. The newly awakened Spock Two uses his Vulcan telepathic abilities to mind meld with his original self and save his life. The two Spocks, in concert with Captain James T. Kirk, convince Keniclius that the need for his plan no longer exists. Spock Two and Keniclius Five devote themselves to restoring the Phylosian civilization as Spock One departs with his shipmates.

== Production ==
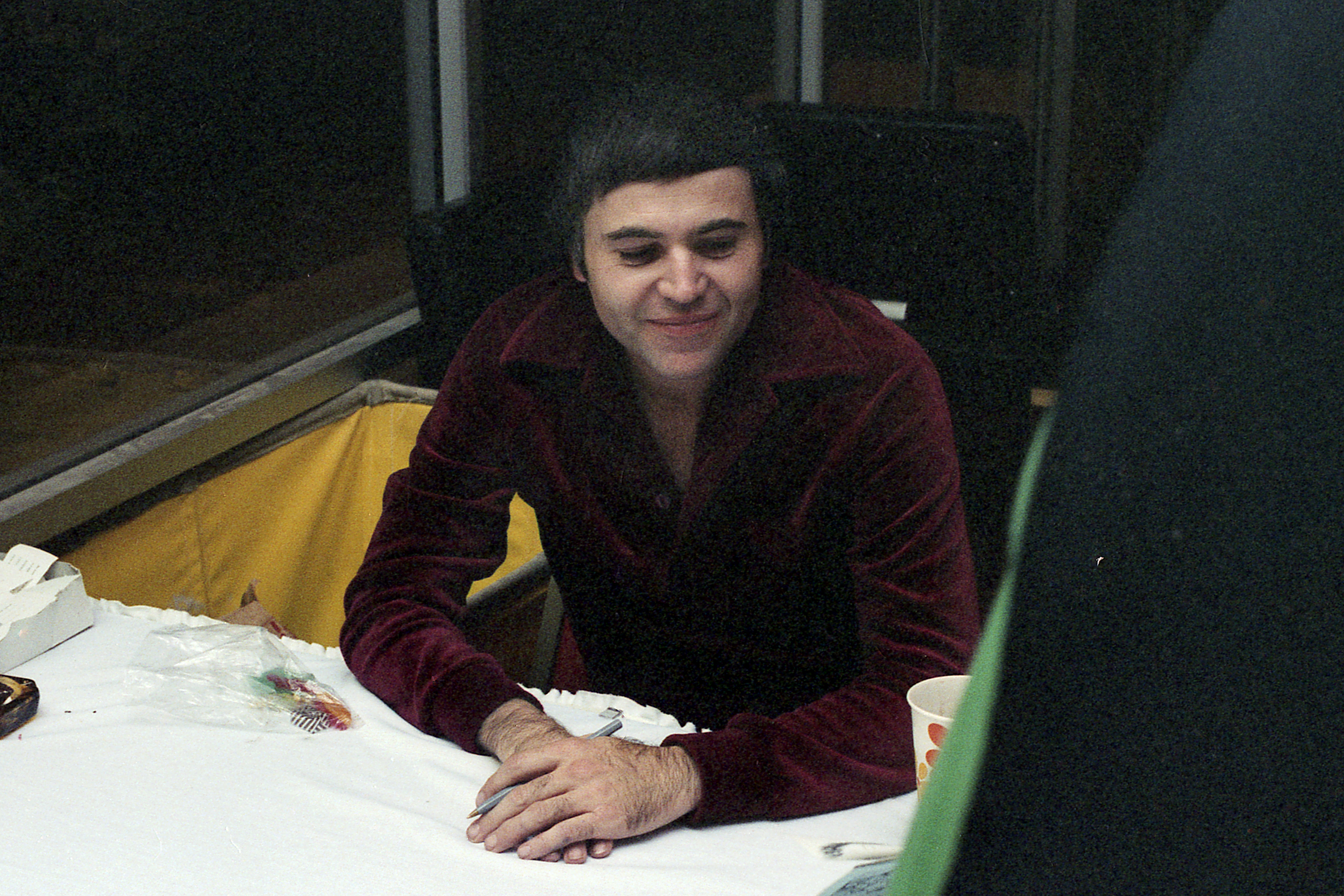
Walter Koenig (pictured in 1979) became the first actor in the franchise to write an episode.

Walter Koenig joined the main cast of Star Trek: The Original Series during the second season as Pavel Chekov and continued to appear in the series until it was cancelled at the end of season three. Although the remaining main cast of the series were hired as voice actors for Star Trek: The Animated Series, Koenig was not brought in due to financial constraints. He only found out about his omission from the show when Sackett announced it on stage at a Star Trek convention he was attending. His character was replaced by a new animated character voiced by James Doohan.

Koenig first became involved with writing a script for The Animated Series after he asked Susan Sackett, Star Trek creator Gene Roddenberry's assistant, to type up some writing he was working on. After reading it through, she thought it was good and passed it to Roddenberry, who agreed and asked Koenig if he was interested in writing for the animated show. He accepted the offer, and started working on a plot involving cloning which was inspired by newspaper articles about the subject, becoming the first actor from Star Trek to write for the franchise.

He found the writing process for "The Infinite Vulcan" "unbearable". This was due to interference from Roddenberry, resulting in Koenig producing ten drafts of the screenplay, and because of Koenig's frustration in not otherwise being involved in the series. He could not understand why so many redrafts were required, a view shared by story editor/associate producer D.C. Fontana. Evidence of the chaos these rewrites caused can be seen in the episode, where at one point Spock leaps up and runs around, the place where he had lain shown to be empty, and then thirty seconds later he is still lying there, unconscious. Roddenberry was keen in particular to make use of the benefits of an animated medium, by including things which could not have been shown on a live-action series. These included "talking vegetables" as characters, which Koenig said were not his idea but were so silly as to not be worthy of a fight. David Alexander, in his book Star Trek Creator: The Authorised Biography of Gene Roddenberry, suggested that Koenig was hired to write "The Infinite Vulcan" because Roddenberry felt "bad" about Koenig's exclusion from the series.

Koenig asked to play the part of Dr. Keniclius. Roddenberry and Fontana approved, and the show's producers allowed him to audition, but he said later that he suspected it was "a very token gesture" and they were not seriously considering him. He included a reference to himself in the episode, as the walking plant is called a Retlaw – Walter spelled backwards. This was a reference to aliens in the 1940s comic book Planet Comics who spoke backwards. He later used a similar idea in "The Stranger", a Land of the Lost episode he wrote, in which Koenig introduced the character Enik. This character was originally called Eneg, backwards for Gene as a reference to Gene Roddenberry.

Koenig felt that "The Infinite Vulcan" turned out "OK", and had heard a number of opinions on it ranging from it being the best episode of The Animated Series to it being the very worst. He felt overall that it was "an interesting take and certainly a little different." Fellow cast member George Takei felt the episode showed that Koenig was "enterprising". The producers liked the episode so much that they wanted Koenig to write another, but he turned them down. Koenig later explained that he was still upset at the time over not appearing as Chekov in the series. Keniclius later appeared in Kevin Lauderdale's story "The Rules of War," which takes place during the Eugenics Wars, in the anthology Strange New Worlds IX.

== Reception ==
James Van Hise wrote in his book The Man Who Created Star Trek: Gene Roddenberry, that "some of the writing on the series", specifically that on "The Infinite Vulcan", "left much to be desired".

"The Infinite Vulcan" was included in best of/recommend lists by some reviewers. For example, in James Rundle's retrospective of the episodes for SciFiNow, he gave "The Infinite Vulcan" a rating of three out of five. The episode was included in seventh place of the best episodes of the series by the website Topless Robot, who added that while Keniclius' plan was "unclear", it had the "greatest ending of a cartoon ever." The Hollywood Reporter rated "The Infinite Vulcan" the 74th best episode of all Star Trek episodes. In Wired magazine list of episodes to watch after they were posted for free on the official Star Trek website, "The Infinite Vulcan" was included specifically because it was the first episode of the franchise to be written by one of the actors.

== Novelization ==
This story was expanded into a novelette by science-fiction author Alan Dean Foster as part of the collection of The Animated Series adapted novelizations and was released as part of Star Trek Log Two, published in September 1974. The other episodes adapted in the same work were "The Survivor" and "The Lorelei Signal".

== Home media release ==
"The Infinite Vulcan" was released on LaserDisc as part of the series set. The first release of Star Trek: The Animated Series on DVD was through fan-made productions. The official DVD release was on November 21, 2006, in the United States, a single release containing all episodes from both seasons of the television show, and on Blu-ray seven days later. This episode was streamed for free on April 5, 2021, as part of the First Contact Day event on Startrek.com, along with several other episodes and roundtable discussions with Star Trek actors.
