= The Survivor (Star Trek: The Animated Series) =

- Star Trek: The Animated Series episode
- Episode no.: Season 1 Episode 6
- Directed by: Hal Sutherland
- Written by: James Schmerer
- Production code: 22005
- Original air date: October 13, 1973

Guest appearance
- Ted Knight – Vendorian (Carter Winston)

Episode chronology
← Previous "More Tribbles, More Troubles"	Next → "The Infinite Vulcan"

"The Survivor" is the sixth episode of the first season of the American animated science fiction television series Star Trek: The Animated Series, and aired on NBC on October 13, 1973. Set in the 23rd century, the series follows the adventures of Captain James T. Kirk (voiced by William Shatner) and the crew of the Starfleet starship Enterprise.

In this episode, the crew find a damaged spacecraft and rescue a shapeshifting alien called the Vendorian, who has disguised himself as a missing philanthropist. Once on board the vessel, he transforms himself into Captain Kirk and tries to take the ship into a Romulan trap, while the real Captain Kirk is unconscious. But after falling in love with the philanthropist's fiancée, Lieutenant Anne Nored (voiced by Nichelle Nichols), the Vendorian saves the Enterprise and Kirk agrees to take his actions into account.

It was written by James Schmerer and directed by Hal Sutherland. Schmerer pitched an idea for an episode to producer D.C. Fontana called "The Chameleon", and together with the series creator Gene Roddenberry, it was developed into the final script. Schmerer and Roddenberry disagreed over some of the changes to the script, as the writer wanted to avoid repeating things that had previously been seen in Star Trek: The Original Series. Critics felt that the episode was similar to those of The Original Series, but it was considered one of the best episodes seen in The Animated Series by Chris Cummins of the website Topless Robot. "The Survivor" was adapted into a novel by Alan Dean Foster and was released on several different home media formats.

== Plot ==
While patrolling near the Romulan Neutral Zone, the Federation starship Enterprise finds a small private ship flown by a Vendorian, an alien species that can transform its shape at will. The alien dupes the Enterprise crew by assuming the form of Carter Winston, a Federation citizen and philanthropist who has been missing for five years. Winston's fiancee, Lieutenant Anne Nored, happens to serve as a security officer aboard the Enterprise; upon their reunion, he breaks off their engagement without explanation.

The Vendorian renders Captain James T. Kirk unconscious, takes his form and orders the helmsman, Lt. Hikaru Sulu to steer the Enterprise into the Neutral Zone, where Romulan warbirds lie in wait. The real Kirk regains consciousness, not remembering ordering the ship into the Neutral Zone, so he agrees to Spock's suggestion that Dr McCoy should examine him. Meanwhile, the Vendorian has taken Dr. McCoy's form and Kirk and Spock become suspicious when "Dr. McCoy" allows that he might have made a mistake - something the real McCoy would never admit to - and a new examination table materializes in the medical bay. They force the Vendorian to reveal his true form, and the alert is sounded. The Vendorian escapes detection and disables the Enterprise's deflector shields, leaving it vulnerable to Romulan attack, while its presence in the Neutral Zone gives the Romulans a pretext to destroy the Enterprise. Captain Kirk then explains that the Vendorian was in league with the Romulans from the beginning.

The Vendorian takes the form of a deflector shield around the Enterprise and the Romulans retreat. The Vendorian shows himself to the Enterprise crew and explains that the nature of his kind is to gradually assume the memories and personal traits of those they impersonate. Because he spent too much time in the form of Carter Winston, he became unwilling to let the Enterprise crew be killed. He is arrested and will face trial, but Kirk tells him that his actions to protect the Enterprise will be taken into consideration. Nored volunteers to guard the Vendorian, saying that he has become similar enough to Winston that she has feelings of love for him.

== Production ==
"The Survivor" is writer James Schmerer's only credit in the Star Trek franchise; his other genre work consisted of two episodes of the television series Wonder Woman as well as a single episode of Buck Rodgers. He was better known for his work on soap operas such as General Hospital and Another World. He pitched stories for Star Trek: The Animated Series on the basis that the show targeted an adult audience similar to Star Trek: The Original Series and not children. He knew it was going to be broadcast on Saturday mornings, but would be unhampered by restrictions on live-action television. He later said "that was one of the reasons why I took it, because I'm not an animated writer... I had written a couple of animated shows through the years, and it was like pulling teeth." He explained that he wrote the script for "The Survivor" as if it was a live-action story; it was originally known as "The Chameleon". The title was eventually changed in order to preserve the plot point as a surprise for the viewer.

He had known producer D.C. Fontana for several years and pitched his story directly to her. In turn, she relayed it to the franchise creator Gene Roddenberry, who called Schmerer back for a meeting. Together they re-wrote the story during the meeting to make it fit within the 30-minute-long animated episode. Schmerer explained that Roddenberry appreciated the idea of an alien pretending to be other characters, and that The Animated Series could easily show the shapeshifter undergo the various changes in the episode. The design of the Vendorian had been described by Schmerer in the script, but was changed to the squid-like design by the animators, a change that Schmerer described as "neat" and "clever". In the original outline, the Vendorian did not assume the role of Kirk. Added by Roddenberry, Schmerer did not agree with the change. Roddenberry and Schmerer argued about the point, with Roddenberry saying that Kirk was the star of the series while Schmerer wanted it to be different as he was concerned that its plot would appear too similar to the events of "Whom Gods Destroy" where Garth of Izar changes his appearance to become Kirk.

== Reception ==
Edward Gross, the senior editor of Cinescape Magazine, rates "The Survivor" as "an above-average episode" that "definitely has the feeling of a live-action [Star Trek] show." Marc Altman compared it to other similarly-themed episodes such as "The Man Trap", which featured a shape-changing alien and a lost love, and said "the shape-changing alien is a familiar genre (and Trekkian trope), the romantic twist in which the Vendorian spy betrays his Romulan masters for love is a nice surprise."

Michelle Erica Green, in her review for TrekNation, found that the voice work was distracting due to the similarity between William Shatner's and Ted Knight's voices; as well as having Nichelle Nichols voice a different character. She also thought that the alien looked silly, and felt that the plot had been reused from "The Man Trap".

Chris Cummins listed the eight best episodes of The Animated Series for website Topless Robot. He praised the writing of Schmerer, saying that the episode felt like an episode of The Original Series, and placed it as the third best episode of the series. It was given four out of five stars in Star Trek: The Complete Manual by SciFiNow magazine.

== Novelization ==
Alan Dean Foster expanded the episode into a novelization, adding such scenes as a Christmas party. It was released as part of Star Trek Log Two, published in September 1974. The other episodes adapted in the same work were "The Lorelei Signal" and "The Infinite Vulcan".

== Home media release ==
"The Survivor" was released on LaserDisc as part of the series set. The first release of Star Trek: The Animated Series on DVD was through fan-made productions. The official DVD release was on November 21, 2006 in the United States, a single release containing all episodes from both seasons of the television show.

== See also ==
- "The Dauphin" – an episode of Star Trek: The Next Generation featuring a shapeshifting alien
