= More Tribbles, More Troubles =

- Star Trek: The Animated Series episode
- Episode no.: Season 1 Episode 5
- Directed by: Hal Sutherland
- Written by: David Gerrold
- Production code: 22001
- Original air date: October 6, 1973

Guest appearance
- Stanley Adams – Cyrano Jones

Episode chronology
← Previous "The Lorelei Signal"	Next → "The Survivor"

"More Tribbles, More Troubles" is the fifth episode of the first season of the animated American science fiction television series Star Trek: The Animated Series. It first aired in the NBC Saturday morning lineup on October 6, 1973, and was written by David Gerrold as a sequel to his Original Series episode "The Trouble with Tribbles". (Note: This story was expanded into a novelette by science-fiction author Alan Dean Foster as part of the collection, Star Trek Log Four (1975) (ISBN 0-345-24435-4).) It features actor Stanley Adams reprising his role of trader Cyrano Jones, and the return of the fuzzy, rapidly reproducing creatures called tribbles.

In this episode, Kirk must figure out why the Klingons are trying to get a hold of Cyrano Jones while simultaneously protecting two automated grain carriers.

== Plot ==
While the Federation starship USS Enterprise escorts two robot cargo ships carrying quintotriticale, a new seed grain, to famine-stricken Sherman's Planet, it encounters a Klingon battlecruiser, commanded by Captain Koloth, firing on a Federation scout ship. The Enterprise beams the pilot aboard. The Klingons use a new energy weapon which incapacitates the starship, and demand they hand over the pilot. First Officer Spock hypothesizes that such a powerful weapon must require all the Klingon ship's energy, and Lt. Uhura notices that the two cargo ships have not been disabled. Captain Kirk has the cargo ships set a course to ram into the Klingon ship. With their energy expended, the Klingon ship is forced to flee, but damages one of the cargo ships. Since the Enterprise cargo hold lacks sufficient space, the crew must dangerously load the ship's decks with the grain.

The pilot is Cyrano Jones, an interstellar trader well known to Kirk and crew. He got out of his task of cleaning up the tribbles on Space Station K-7 using a genetically engineered creature known as a glommer, which preys on tribbles. Jones is now selling "safe", pink, in some instances massive, tribbles, genetically engineered to be sterile. The Klingons attack again, disabling the engines of the remaining cargo ship and bathing the Enterprise in a radiation which rapidly increases the growth of the tribbles aboard. Kirk still refuses to hand over Jones, ostensibly because he is a Federation citizen, but actually because he suspects the Klingons would not have violated Federation space unless Jones were of great value to them. The Klingons again use their new weapon. Kirk responds by having the tribbles beamed over to their ship.

Now at a disadvantage, Koloth admits that Klingon planets are being overrun by tribbles sold by Jones. The glommer, which was created by the Klingons via genetic engineering and stolen by Jones, is their only hope of controlling them. Kirk returns it, but the huge tribbles scare it away. Koloth orders his first officer to shoot the large tribble, only to inadvertently free smaller ones inside. Chief Medical Officer Dr. McCoy, having discovered in advance that the large tribbles are actually tribble colonies, injects the remaining tribbles on the Enterprise with a serum to slow down their metabolic rate.

== Production ==
Originally pitched as a third season follow up to "The Trouble with Tribbles" for Star Trek: The Original Series, the idea was scrapped under the tenure of producer Fred Freiberger, who was not a fan of the original episode and did not want to produce comedy episodes.

In 1973, Gerrold and Star Trek writer D. C. Fontana were appearing on the Star Trek convention circuit together. Fontana was executive producer of the new Star Trek: The Animated Series; Gerrold offered to write an episode and Fontana responded that she was interested in a tribble sequel.

As with his other Animated Series episode "Bem", Gerrold later claimed that almost nothing was cut from the original pitches for The Original Series as animation played out quicker and so everything still fit into the episode despite the reduced running time.

Both of Gerrold's episodes written for the Animated Series were later novelized by Alan Dean Foster, and Gerrold said that he thought that Foster did "a fine job".

== Reception ==
A Star Trek binge-watching guide by Den of Geek, recommended this episode as part of the "foundations of Star Trek" group. CBR rated "More Tribbles, More Troubles" the 9th funniest episode of the Star Trek franchise, commenting, "It's a good balance of action and comedy as once more, the Tribbles are used as weapons."

== Home media releases ==
The Star Trek: The Original Series season 2 remastered DVD set also included special features for 'Tribbles', including original series episode "The Trouble with Tribbles" and the episodes "Trials and Tribblations" from Star Trek: Deep Space Nine and "More Tribbles, More Trouble" from TAS.

On November 15, 2016 "More Tribbles, More Troubles" was released on HD on Blu-Ray as part of the complete TAS box set.

== See also ==
- "The Trouble with Tribbles" - The first "Tribble" episode from Star Trek: The Original Series
- "Trials and Tribble-ations" - A Time-Travel episode from Star Trek: Deep Space Nine that revisits the first episode
- "The Bounty" - An episode of Star Trek: Picard featuring the "Attack Tribble"
- "The Trouble with Edward" - a Short Trek origin story set aboard the USS Cabot
