= Star Trek: The Animated Series =

American animated science fiction television series (1973–1974)

- Genre: Adventure; Science fiction
- Created by: Gene Roddenberry
- Showrunners: Gene Roddenberry; D. C. Fontana
- Directed by: Hal Sutherland; Bill Reed
- Voices of: William Shatner; Leonard Nimoy; DeForest Kelley; James Doohan; Nichelle Nichols; George Takei; Majel Barrett
- Composers: Yvette Blais; Jeff Michael
- Country of origin: United States
- Original language: English
- No. of seasons: 2
- No. of episodes: 22

Production
- Executive producers: Gene Roddenberry; D. C. Fontana
- Producers: Norm Prescott; Lou Scheimer
- Running time: 23–24 minutes
- Production companies: Filmation; Norway Productions; Paramount Television

Original release
- Network: NBC
- Release: September 8, 1973 – October 12, 1974

Related
- Star Trek TV series; Star Trek

Star Trek (commonly referred to as Star Trek: The Animated Series or TAS) is an American animated science fiction television series created by Gene Roddenberry. It originally aired simply under the title Star Trek, subtitled Created by Gene Roddenberry, on Saturday mornings from September 8, 1973, to October 12, 1974, on NBC, spanning 22 episodes over two seasons. The second series in the Star Trek franchise, it features mostly the same characters as Star Trek: The Original Series. Set in the 23rd century, the series follows the further adventures of the Starship USS Enterprise as it explores the galaxy.

After the cancellation of The Original Series (TOS) in 1969, the live-action show proved popular in syndication and generated significant fan enthusiasm. This resulted in Roddenberry's decision to continue the series in animated form, with the medium allowing for spectacular imagery and non-humanoid aliens the original series could not practically depict. Much of the original cast returned to provide voices for their characters. Series writers David Gerrold and D. C. Fontana characterized The Animated Series as effectively a fourth season of The Original Series. After the conclusion of The Animated Series, the adventures of the characters continued in live-action theatrical films, beginning with the 1979 film Star Trek: The Motion Picture.

The Animated Series was critically acclaimed and was the first Star Trek series to win an Emmy Award when its second season received the 1975 Emmy for Outstanding Entertainment – Children's Series.

== Premise ==
Star Trek: The Animated Series is set in the 23rd century in the Star Trek universe, in which Earth is part of the multi-species United Federation of Planets. The Federation's military and exploration division, Starfleet, operates a fleet of starships that travel the galaxy establishing contact with alien races. It follows the adventures of the Starfleet vessel USS Enterprise under the command of Captain James T. Kirk as it explores the Milky Way galaxy.

== Voice cast and characters ==
- William Shatner as James T. Kirk, captain and commanding officer of the USS Enterprise.
- Leonard Nimoy as Spock, first officer and science officer.
- DeForest Kelley as Doctor Leonard McCoy, chief medical officer.
- James Doohan as Montgomery "Scotty" Scott, chief engineer.
  - Doohan also voiced Arex, a navigator.
- Nichelle Nichols as Nyota Uhura, communications officer.
- George Takei as Hikaru Sulu, helmsman.
- Majel Barrett as Christine Chapel, medical officer.
  - Barrett also voiced M'Ress, a communications officer, as well as the ship's computer.

== Episodes ==
=== Series overview ===
| Season | Episodes | Originally released | |
| Season | Episodes | First released | Last released |
|---|---|---|---|
| 1 | 16 | September 8, 1973 | January 12, 1974 |
| 2 | 6 | September 7, 1974 | October 12, 1974 |

=== Season 1 (1973–74) ===
| No. overall | No. in season | Title | Directed by | Written by | Original release date |
|---|---|---|---|---|---|
| 1 | 1 | "Beyond the Farthest Star" | Hal Sutherland | Samuel A. Peeples | September 8, 1973 |
While exploring on the outermost rim of the galaxy, the USS Enterprise is pulled into the orbit of a dead star. Trapped there, the crew discovers that there is an ancient derelict pod ship trapped with them as well.
| 2 | 2 | "Yesteryear" | Hal Sutherland | D. C. Fontana | September 15, 1973 |
Spock must travel to the past to rescue his younger self from danger.
| 3 | 3 | "One of Our Planets Is Missing" | Hal Sutherland | Marc Daniels | September 22, 1973 |
The Enterprise encounters a giant cloud creature that feeds on the energy of the planets that lie in its path. They determine that it is heading for Mantilles, home to a Federation colony governed by former Starfleet officer Bob Wesley (featured in the TOS episode "The Ultimate Computer)".
| 4 | 4 | "The Lorelei Signal" | Hal Sutherland | Margaret Armen | September 29, 1973 |
Investigating a sector of space where starships have disappeared every 27 years, the Enterprise finds a race of beautiful women living on the planet Taurus II.
| 5 | 5 | "More Tribbles, More Troubles" | Hal Sutherland | David Gerrold | October 6, 1973 |
While the USS Enterprise escorts two robot cargo ships carrying quintotriticale, a new seed grain, to famine-stricken Sherman's Planet, it encounters a Klingon battlecruiser pursuing a Federation scout ship. When the Enterprise rescues the pilot, the Klingons attack with a new energy weapon and demand that the pilot be handed over to them.
| 6 | 6 | "The Survivor" | Hal Sutherland | James Schmerer | October 13, 1973 |
Patrolling near the Romulan Neutral Zone, the USS Enterprise finds a ship carrying Carter Winston, a Federation citizen and philanthropist who has been missing for five years.
| 7 | 7 | "The Infinite Vulcan" | Hal Sutherland | Walter Koenig | October 20, 1973 |
While visiting the newly discovered planet Phylos, Lieutenant Sulu picks up a walking plant, called a Retlaw, and is poisoned. The alien species that inhabit the planet, who are plantlike beings, approach and save Sulu's life, but kidnap Mr. Spock.
| 8 | 8 | "The Magicks of Megas-tu" | Hal Sutherland | Larry Brody | October 27, 1973 |
While exploring near the center of the galaxy, the USS Enterprise is caught inside an energy/matter vortex and all her computer systems fail. A being named Lucien appears on the bridge, repairs the ship's systems and takes the crew to explore his planet, Megas-Tu.
| 9 | 9 | "Once Upon a Planet" | Hal Sutherland | Chuck Menville and Len Janson | November 3, 1973 |
The Enterprise crew revisits the "amusement park" planet first seen in the Classic Trek episode "Shore Leave" hoping for some rest and relaxation.
| 10 | 10 | "Mudd's Passion" | Hal Sutherland | Stephen Kandel | November 10, 1973 |
The USS Enterprise receives orders to arrest Federation outlaw Harry Mudd, who is accused of selling fake love crystals. Intercepting Harry on the mining colony of Motherlode, they bring him aboard the Enterprise.
| 11 | 11 | "The Terratin Incident" | Hal Sutherland | Paul Schneider | November 17, 1973 |
While observing a burnt-out supernova, the USS Enterprise picks up a strange message transmitted in a two-hundred-year-old code.
| 12 | 12 | "The Time Trap" | Hal Sutherland | Joyce Perry | November 24, 1973 |
While exploring the Delta Triangle, where many starships have disappeared, the USS Enterprise is attacked by several Klingon vessels. During the battle, they are caught in an ion storm. The Enterprise and one Klingon battlecruiser are drawn into a spacetime vortex and end up in a timeless dimension.
| 13 | 13 | "The Ambergris Element" | Hal Sutherland | Margaret Armen | December 1, 1973 |
While exploring the water planet Argo, Captain Kirk and Mr. Spock are transformed into water breathers by the planet's undersea inhabitants, the Aquans. In order to return to their normal selves, they must enlist the help of the Aquans to capture a giant sur-snake, whose venom holds the antidote.
| 14 | 14 | "The Slaver Weapon" | Hal Sutherland | Adapted from the short story "The Soft Weapon" by : Larry Niven; Written by : Larry Niven | December 8, 1973 |
In the shuttlecraft Copernicus, Mr. Spock, Uhura and Sulu are en route to Starbase 25 to deliver a stasis box—a rare artifact of the Slaver culture when the Kzinti intervene.
| 15 | 15 | "The Eye of the Beholder" | Hal Sutherland | David P. Harmon | January 5, 1974 |
The disappearance of a scientific team lures the USS Enterprise to investigate near Lactra VII. The starship Ariel is located there, abandoned, with its captain having transported to the planet's surface.
| 16 | 16 | "The Jihad" | Hal Sutherland | Stephen Kandel | January 12, 1974 |
The USS Enterprise arrives at the Vedala asteroid, where Captain Kirk and Mr. Spock have been summoned to learn about a stolen religious artifact, the "Soul of the Skorr", whose theft could ignite a galactic holy war.

=== Season 2 (1974) ===
| No. overall | No. in season | Title | Directed by | Written by | Original release date |
|---|---|---|---|---|---|
| 17 | 1 | "The Pirates of Orion" | Bill Reed | Howard Weinstein | September 7, 1974 |
Spock contracts a fatal illness, and the cure can only be found with dangerous Orion pirates.
| 18 | 2 | "Bem" | Bill Reed | David Gerrold | September 14, 1974 |
The Enterprise crew is taken captive by a race of primitives on a newly discovered planet.
| 19 | 3 | "The Practical Joker" | Bill Reed | Chuck Menville and Len Janson | September 21, 1974 |
A strange energy field causes the Enterprise computer to play practical jokes on the crew, but the humor soon turns to danger.
| 20 | 4 | "Albatross" | Bill Reed | Dario Finelli | September 28, 1974 |
Doctor McCoy is arrested for allegedly causing a deadly plague which once ravaged the planet Dramia.
| 21 | 5 | "How Sharper Than a Serpent's Tooth" | Bill Reed | Russell Bates and David Wise | October 5, 1974 |
A mysterious being threatens to destroy the Enterprise if the crew is unable to solve an ancient puzzle.
| 22 | 6 | "The Counter-Clock Incident" | Bill Reed | John Culver | October 12, 1974 |
An unusual spaceship pulls the Enterprise into a "negative universe" where time seems to flow backwards.

== Production ==
=== Development ===
Lou Scheimer of Filmation was in talks with Star Trek producer Paramount Television, TV network NBC, and creator Gene Roddenberry to create an animated spin-off series while The Original Series was still on the air, during its third season (1968–69).

Paramount's director of special programming Philip Mayer and Filmation writer/animator Don Christensen worked together to create a proposal for a series that would target a young audience and have an educational spin. The main cast of Star Trek: The Original Series would train the teenage crew of a ship called Excalibur about space exploration; the new teenage crew included a Vulcan named Steve, an African-American boy named Bob, and a Chinese boy named Stick. Due to the bitter relationship between Roddenberry and Paramount at the time, however, Scheimer was not able to get the two parties talking to each other in order to agree on a deal for several years. During this time, the project in its original form was phased out.

A deal was finally reached in early 1973, and publicly announced in early March 1973. Because of NBC's strong interest in the series, Roddenberry and Filmation were allotted very generous terms: a guaranteed minimum of two seasons with a combined 22 episodes; a budget of US$75,000 (equivalent to $543,947 in 2025) per episode; and full creative control in Gene Roddenberry's hands.

Roddenberry and Filmation agreed that the series should be for all ages, rather than the children-oriented approach of the original proposal, and at Roddenberry's suggestion The Original Series script editor D. C. Fontana was hired as the series' story editor and associate producer. Despite the meager payment for writers—$1,300 per script (equivalent to $9,428 in 2025), with no residuals—the opportunity to write a Star Trek episode without the special effects limitations of live action proved appealing, and many of The Original Series writers joined the staff. Fontana steered the series away from the romantic and sexual elements of The Original Series, as she felt children would not be interested in them, and she wanted The Animated Series to appeal to children as well as adults.

=== Writing ===
The series' writing benefited from a Writers Guild of America, East strike in 1973, which did not apply to animation. A few episodes were written by well-known science fiction authors:

- "More Tribbles, More Troubles" was written by David Gerrold as a sequel to his episode "The Trouble with Tribbles" from the original series. Here Cyrano Jones is rescued from the Klingons, bringing with him a genetically altered breed of tribbles which do not reproduce but do grow extremely large. (It is later discovered that these are really clusters of tribbles who function as a single tribble, and it is decided that the large numbers of smaller tribbles are preferable to the larger ones.) The Klingons, because of their hatred of tribbles, are eager to get Jones back because he stole a creature they created: a predator called a "glommer" that feeds on tribbles.
- "Yesteryear" is a time-travel episode in which Mr. Spock uses "The Guardian of Forever", a time gateway from the original series episode "The City on the Edge of Forever", to travel back to his own childhood. This is the only animated Trek episode written by original series and later Next Generation writer D. C. Fontana. This was the first actual appearance of Spock's pet sehlat, first mentioned in "Journey to Babel" and finally named I-Chaya in this episode. One element from "Yesteryear" that has become canonical by depiction within Star Trek: The Original Series is the Vulcan city of ShiKahr, depicted in a background scene wherein Kirk, Spock and McCoy walk across a natural stone bridge (first depicted in Star Trek III: The Search for Spock) in the remastered "Amok Time". Elements of Spock's childhood from "Yesteryear" are also referenced in the Star Trek: The Next Generation episode "Unification" as well as the 2009 Star Trek feature film.
- Larry Niven's "The Slaver Weapon", adapted from his own short story "The Soft Weapon". It includes some elements from his Known Space mythos such as the Kzinti and the Slavers. This is the only Kirk-era television or movie story in which Kirk did not appear. This episode is also the only animated one in which characters are shown dying or being killed.

=== Casting and voice recording ===
The Animated Series featured most of the original cast voicing their characters. The major exception was the character of Pavel Chekov (Walter Koenig), who did not appear in the series because the series' budget could not afford the complete cast. He was replaced by Lieutenant Arex, whose Edosian species had three arms and three legs; Lieutenant M'Ress, a female Caitian, sometimes stood in for Uhura as communications officer. Besides performing their characters Montgomery Scott and Christine Chapel, James Doohan and Majel Barrett also performed the voices of Arex and M'Ress, respectively. Barrett also voiced various other characters and the main computer.

Initially, Filmation was only going to use the voices of William Shatner, Leonard Nimoy, DeForest Kelley, Doohan and Barrett. Doohan and Barrett would also perform the voices of Sulu and Uhura. Reportedly, when Nimoy arrived at the initial recording session for the first few episodes, he immediately noticed the absence of George Takei and Nichelle Nichols; when informed they had not been hired for the series due to budgetary reasons, Nimoy refused to voice Spock unless Takei and Nichols were added to the cast, stating that Sulu and Uhura were proof of the ethnic diversity of the 23rd century and should not be recast. Nimoy also took this stand as a matter of principle, as he knew of the financial troubles many of his Star Trek co-stars had experienced after cancellation of the series. According to Scheimer, when Nimoy pointed out that the casting would cut the only two minority actors from the series, "We were horrified at our unintended slight, made all the worse because we were the one studio who had been championing diversity in its output." Takei and Nichols were quickly hired and the recording session was rescheduled. Koenig was not forgotten, as Filmation were able to assuage Nimoy's complaints on his account by buying a script from Koenig for one episode ("The Infinite Vulcan").

Voice recording began in June 1973, with the first three episodes recorded as an ensemble, i.e. all the voice actors for the episode in the room at the same time. Later episodes used the now more typical model of recording the voice actors separately to work around their other commitments. William Shatner and Leonard Nimoy, who were both touring in plays at the time, recorded their lines in whatever city they happened to be performing in and had the tapes shipped to the studio. Doohan and Barrett, besides providing the voices of their Original Series characters and newcomers Arex and M'Ress, performed virtually all of the "guest star" characters in the series, with exceptions such as Sarek, Cyrano Jones and Harry Mudd, who were performed by Mark Lenard, Stanley Adams and Roger C. Carmel respectively, the original actors from The Original Series. Other guest voice actors included Ed Bishop, who voiced the Megan Prosecutor in "The Magicks of Megas-tu", and Ted Knight, who voiced Carter Winston in "The Survivor". Nichelle Nichols performed character voices in addition to Uhura in several episodes, including "The Time Trap" and "The Lorelei Signal".

Because of the FCC equal-time rule, the premiere episode was not aired in the Los Angeles market. Takei was a political candidate for a seat on the city council, and KNBC feared that allowing his voiceover work to be heard would force the station to provide equal time for Takei's opponents.

=== Animation and design ===
The characters of TAS

Similar to most animated series of the era, the 22 episodes of TAS were spread out over two brief seasons, with copious reruns of each episode. The director of the first season (16 episodes) was Hal Sutherland and Bill Reed directed the six episodes of season two, though the first four episodes of season two erroneously credit Sutherland.

Don Christensen, creator of the original proposal, remained involved as art director. Other animation staff included Reuben Timmins (who oversaw all shots involving the Enterprise) and Bob Kline. The animators rotoscoped the animations for the Enterprise and the original cast from 35 mm film footage of The Original Series. The chevrons were enlarged to make them easier to animate, but otherwise the crew's uniforms were unaltered from The Original Series. Due to the hiring of nearly the entire regular cast of the original show, little money was left in the budget for the animation, so Filmation cut costs by using stock footage and shortcuts such as having a character put a hand to their mouth while speaking (thus eliminating the need to animate the lips) and silhouetting characters in action.

Star Trek: The Animated Series was the only Star Trek series not to be produced with a cold open ("teaser"), instead starting directly with the title credits sequence. However, some overseas versions of the original live action series, such as those aired by the BBC in the United Kingdom in the 1960s and 1970s, were edited to run the teaser after the credits.

=== Music ===
The animated series dispensed with the original series' theme music, composed by Alexander Courage, in favor of a new theme credited to Yvette Blais and Jeff Michael, but actually written by Filmation composer Ray Ellis. Ellis used the pseudonym Yvette Blais (the maiden name of his wife) due to complications with royalties and publishing companies, while Jeff Michael is a pseudonym for producer Norm Prescott, who received a pseudonymous credit and a cut of the royalties on all of Filmation's music as part of a standard deal for the time. Writing on Facebook's Starlog Magazine official page in March 2021, David Gerrold revealed that the reason for this was a longstanding feud between Courage and Roddenberry over residual payments for airings of Star Trek: TOS episodes using the original theme: "When Courage turned in the original music, Roddenberry added his own lyrics to it, thereby depriving Courage of half his residuals. Courage never forgave Roddenberry and refused to give permission for the reuse of the theme. That's why new music was written for the animated series and again for the movies."

== Reception ==
=== Critical response ===
Through both seasons, Star Trek: The Animated Series faced the reverse situation of The Original Series with regard to its popularity: ratings were high, but skewed away from the young children which Saturday morning advertisers were trying to reach, being more popular with adults and older children.

IGN named Star Trek: The Animated Series the 96th best animated series. They declared that although the series suffered from technical limitations, its format allowed the writers far greater freedom and creativity than was possible in the original live-action series. In an L.A. Times listing that included each Star Trek film and TV series separately, The Animated Series was ranked 11th. The comic Star Trek vs Transformers was inspired by The Animated Series, and takes place in a similar universe. CBR ranked all 31 seasons of Star Trek television shows, placing season 1 of TAS at 23rd, and season 2 at 24th. Similarly to IGN, they commented that "The animation is definitely limited by today's standards, but the idea of an animated Star Trek makes perfect sense, since concerns over budget and scope would be very different. Although only two seasons long, we were given some memorable moments." Moviefone ranked The Animated Series the seventh best out of seven Star Trek TV series.

=== Accolades ===
| Year | Award | Category | Nominee(s) | Result | Ref. |
|---|---|---|---|---|---|
| 1974 | Daytime Emmy Awards | Outstanding Children's Series | Lou Scheimer, Norm Prescott | Nominated | |
| 1975 | Daytime Emmy Awards | Outstanding Entertainment - Children's Series | Lou Scheimer, Norm Prescott | Won | |
| 2007 | Saturn Awards | Best Retro Television Release on DVD | Star Trek: The Animated Series | Nominated | |
| 2017 | Saturn Awards | Best Television DVD Release | Star Trek: The Animated Series | Nominated | |

== Legacy ==
All of this series' episodes were novelized by Alan Dean Foster and released in ten volumes under the Star Trek Logs banner. Initially, Foster adapted three episodes per book, but later editions saw the half-hour scripts expanded into full, novel-length stories.

=== Novelties in the series ===
In the original Star Trek series, the main character was given the name James T. Kirk. It was not until the animated series that writer David Gerrold expanded on the "T", establishing Kirk's middle name as Tiberius. By coincidence, on Gene Roddenberry's first series The Lieutenant, the principal character was William Tiberius Rice. According to Gerrold, he had been influenced by I, Claudius, and had approached Roddenberry with his choice of middle name, who agreed; Gerrold did not learn about the earlier use of the name until 2014.

The animated series introduced a three-armed, three-legged alien member of the bridge crew with a long neck named Arex and a cat-like alien crew member named M'Ress. According to Roddenberry, budget limitations would have made it impossible for either alien species to appear in a live action series of the time.

The USS Enterprise in this series, while supposedly the same ship as from the original series, has a holodeck similar to the one later seen in Star Trek: The Next Generation, which was set about eighty years later. It only appeared once, in Chuck Menville's "The Practical Joker", and was known as the "Rec Room". This feature was originally proposed for the original series but was never used.

Personal force field technology known as the life support belt was seen only in Star Trek: The Animated Series. In addition to the in-universe use in supplying the wearer with the appropriate atmosphere and environmental protection, it permitted the animators to simply draw the belt and yellow glow around the existing characters, instead of having to redraw them with an environmental suit. A version of the life support belt later appeared in an early Star Trek: The Next Generation novel, The Peacekeepers, where they are referred to as "field-effect suits".

The episode "The Lorelei Signal" provides a rare instance in early Star Trek in which a woman took temporary command of a starship. Due to the male crew members being incapacitated, Uhura assumes command of the Enterprise from Scotty. Other instances occurred on the first and last adventures filmed in the original series:

- "The Cage", in which Number One took command after the abduction of Captain Christopher Pike, and
- "Turnabout Intruder", in which Dr. Janice Lester took over the body of Captain Kirk and assumed command.

"The Lorelei Signal" and "The Infinite Vulcan", the latter written by Walter Koenig, are rare occurrences where Captain Kirk comes close to actually saying, "Beam me up, Scotty" (long erroneously believed to be a Star Trek catchphrase), when he commands "Beam us up, Scotty". Star Trek IV: The Voyage Home arguably comes closer to it by having Kirk say "Scotty, beam me up".

An anti-pollution public service announcement was created for non-profit Keep America Beautiful featuring the ST: TAS characters and original cast voices. In the ad, the Enterprise encounters the "Rhombian Pollution Belt". The ad ran during Saturday morning network programming during the series' run.

=== Canon issues ===
At the end of the first season of Star Trek: The Next Generation, all licenses for Star Trek spin-off fiction were renegotiated, and the animated series was essentially "decanonized" by Gene Roddenberry's office. Writers of the novels, comics and role-playing games were prohibited from using concepts from the animated series in their works. Among the facts established within the animated series that were called into question by the "official canon" issue was its identification of Robert April as the first captain of the USS Enterprise in the episode "The Counter-Clock Incident".

The Star Trek Chronology by production staffers Michael Okuda and Denise Okuda does not include the animated series, but does include certain events from "Yesteryear" and acknowledges Robert April as first captain of the Enterprise. The timeline in Voyages of the Imagination dates the events of the series to 2269–2270, assuming the events of the show represented the final part of Kirk's five-year mission, and using revised Alan Dean Foster stardates. In the updated October 1999 edition of their book: The Star Trek Encyclopedia: A Reference Guide to the Future, Michael and Denise Okuda state that:

In a related vein, this work (i.e. book) adheres to Paramount studio policy that regards the animated Star Trek series as not being part of the "official" Star Trek universe, even though we count ourselves among that series' fans. Of course, the final decision as to the "authenticity" of the animated episodes, as with all elements of the show, must clearly be the choice of each individual reader.'

David Gerrold, who contributed two stories to TAS, stated in an interview his views on the canon issue:

Arguments about "canon" are silly. I always felt that Star Trek Animated was part of Star Trek because Gene Roddenberry accepted the paycheck for it and put his name on the credits. And D. C. Fontana—and all the other writers involved—busted their butts to make it the best Star Trek they could. But this whole business of "canon" really originated with Gene's errand boy. Gene liked giving people titles instead of raises, so the errand boy got named "archivist" and apparently it went to his head. Gene handed him the responsibility of answering all fan questions, silly or otherwise, and he apparently let that go to his head.

Writer-producer D. C. Fontana discussed the TAS Canon issue in 2007:

I suppose "canon" means what Gene Roddenberry decided it was. Remember, we were making it up as we went along on the original series (and on the animated one, too). We had a research company to keep us on the straight and narrow as to science, projected science based on known science, science fiction references (we didn't want to step on anyone's exclusive ideas in movies, other TV shows, or printed work). They also helped prevent contradictions and common reference errors. So the so-called canon evolved in its own way and its own time. For whatever reason, Gene Roddenberry apparently didn't take the animated series seriously (no pun intended), although we worked very hard to do original STAR TREK stories and concepts at all times in the animated series.

=== References in other Star Trek series ===
Since Roddenberry's death in 1991, and the subsequent exit of Richard H. Arnold (who vetted the licensed tie-ins for Roddenberry's Star Trek office at Paramount during its later years), there have been several references to the animated series in the various other Trek series. In the Star Trek: Deep Space Nine episode "Once More Unto the Breach", Kor referred to his ship, the Klothos, which was first named in the TAS episode "The Time Trap". Other DS9 episodes to make reference to the animated series include "Broken Link", where Elim Garak mentions Edosian orchids (Arex is an Edosian) and "Tears of the Prophets" where a Miranda-class starship is called the USS ShirKahr (sic) after ShiKahr, the city from "Yesteryear". In the episode "Prophet Motive" the title of healer is resurrected from "Yesteryear" as well. Vulcan's Forge is also mentioned in "Change of Heart", in which Worf wants to honeymoon there with Jadzia Dax, as well as in episodes "The Forge", "Awakening" and "Kir'Shara" from Star Trek: Enterprise.

The Star Trek: Enterprise episodes "The Catwalk" and "The Forge" included references to "Yesteryear", the latter featuring a CGI rendition of a wild sehlat. The remastered Original Series episode "Amok Time" featured ShiKahr in the background as Spock beams up at the episode's ending, and the remastered version of "The Ultimate Computer" replaced the Botany Bay-style Woden with an automated grain carrier from "More Tribbles, More Troubles".

The 2009 film Star Trek also references "Yesteryear", featuring a nearly identical scene in which a young Spock is confronted by several other Vulcan children, who bully and provoke him for being part human.

The 2017 series Star Trek: Discovery episode "Context Is for Kings" has Spock's foster sister Michael Burnham state that their mother Amanda read Alice in Wonderland to them as children, as in the episode "Once Upon a Planet". The second season episode "Light and Shadows" expands on Amanda's reasons for doing so.

The 2021 series Season 2 of Star Trek: Lower Decks episode 2 Kayshon, His Eyes Open features the skeleton of Giant Spock from TAS season 1 episode 7 "The Infinite Vulcan". Also in Season 2 of Star Trek: Lower Decks episode 8 "I, Excretus" features a Pandronian drill administrator named Shari yn Yem, the first Pandronian in the history of Trek to appear outside of TAS. The race was introduced in TAS episode "Bem".

Carter Winston, from "The Survivor", has a small but important role late in the 1984 tie-in novel The Final Reflection by John M. Ford. In recent years, references to The Animated Series have also cropped up again in the licensed books and comics.

M'Ress and Arex, characters from the animated series, appear in the Star Trek: New Frontier novels by Peter David, in which M'Ress and Arex are transported through time to the 24th Century, and are made officers on board the USS Trident. (David's previous use of these characters, in TOS movie-era comics published by DC Comics, had been ended by Gene Roddenberry's office.)

A race introduced in the episode "The Jihad", represented by a character named EM/3/GREEN, is named the Nasat in the Starfleet Corps of Engineers e-book novellas. These stories feature a regular Nasat character, P8 Blue. The Vulcan city of ShiKahr also appears in many books. Paula Block, then of CBS Consumer Products, was responsible for approving proposals and all completed manuscripts for the licensed media tie-ins and granted many such uses of TAS material since Roddenberry's death.

Amarillo Design Bureau has—as part of its license for the Star Fleet Universe series of games—incorporated many aspects of The Animated Series into its works, not least being the inclusion of the Kzinti, although in a modified form. In addition FASA used elements from The Animated Series in its sourcebooks and modules for its Star Trek role-playing game.

Star Trek: Enterprise producer Manny Coto has commented that had the show been renewed for a fifth season, the Kzinti would have been introduced. Starship designs were produced which closely resemble the Kzinti/Mirak ships from the Star Fleet Universe, a gaming universe that includes the boardgame Star Fleet Battles and its PC analogue Star Fleet Command. The Kzinti were referenced in dialog in the Star Trek: Picard episode "Nepenthe", which marked their first canonical on-screen mention since The Animated Series.

On June 27, 2007, Star Trek's official site incorporated information from The Animated Series into its library section, with many pointing to this as evidence that the animated series is canonical, though this has not been officially confirmed. Both David Gerrold and D. C. Fontana have stated that the animated series is essentially the fourth season that fans wanted originally.

=== Very Short Treks ===
In July 2023, a series of five animated short films in the style of Star Trek: The Animated Series were announced. Made for the 50th anniversary of that series, they are expected to represent most of the previous Star Trek series, and featuring members of their cast and characters. Titled Star Trek: Very Short Treks, the series premiered on September 8, 2023.

== Bibliography ==
- Alexander, David (February 16, 1995). Star Trek Creator: The Authorized Biography of Gene Roddenberry. Roc. ISBN 0-451-45440-5.
- Ayers, Jeff (2006). Voyages of the Imagination: The Star Trek Fiction Companion. Pocket Books. ISBN 1-4165-0349-8.
- Okuda, Mike; Okuda, Denise (1996). Star Trek Chronology: The History of the Future. Pocket Books. ISBN 0-671-53610-9.
