= Trials and Tribble-ations =

- Star Trek: Deep Space Nine episode
- The episode digitally inserted the Deep Space Nine cast into footage from Star Trek: The Original Series.
- Episode no.: Season 5 Episode 6
- Directed by: Jonathan West
- Story by: Ira Steven Behr; Hans Beimler; Robert Hewitt Wolfe
- Teleplay by: Ronald D. Moore; René Echevarria
- Cinematography by: Kris Krosskove
- Editing by: Steve Tucker
- Production code: 503
- Original air date: November 4, 1996

Guest appearances
- Jack Blessing as Dulmur; James W. Jansen as Lucsly; Charlie Brill as Arne Darvin; Leslie Ackerman as Waitress; Charles S. Chun as Engineer; Morry Brookler as Chief Security Officer.; Deirdre L. Imershein as Lt. Watley

Episode chronology
← Previous "The Assignment"	Next → "Let He Who Is Without Sin..."
- Star Trek: Deep Space Nine season 5

"Trials and Tribble-ations" is the 104th episode of the American science fiction television series Star Trek: Deep Space Nine, the sixth episode of the fifth season. It was written as a tribute to the original series of Star Trek, in the year of that show's 30th anniversary; sister series Voyager also produced a tribute episode, "Flashback".

Set in the 24th century, Star Trek: Deep Space Nine follows the adventures of the crew of the space station Deep Space Nine, near the planet Bajor, as the Bajorans recover from a brutal, decades-long occupation by the imperialistic Cardassians. In this episode, Captain Benjamin Sisko (Avery Brooks) and the crew aboard the USS Defiant are taken back in time to the events of the Original Series episode "The Trouble with Tribbles", and must work to prevent the assassination of Captain James T. Kirk (William Shatner) of the USS Enterprise by a Klingon using a booby-trapped tribble.

The idea for the episode was suggested by René Echevarria, and Ronald D. Moore suggested the link to "The Trouble with Tribbles". The two were credited for their work on the teleplay, with the story credit going to Ira Steven Behr, Hans Beimler and Robert Hewitt Wolfe. The episode features the Deep Space Nine actors digitally inserted into footage from the Original Series. Actor Charlie Brill, who played the role of Arne Darvin in "The Trouble With Tribbles", returned to reprise the role as an older Darvin.

"Trials and Tribble-ations" was warmly received by critics with praise directed at the nostalgia and level of detail seen on screen. It was the most watched episode of the fifth season. "Trials and Tribble-ations" was nominated in three Primetime Emmy Award categories and for the Hugo Award for Best Dramatic Presentation, but did not win any awards. It was released on VHS initially alongside "The Trouble with Tribbles", and later as part of the normal release schedule. It was subsequently released as part of the season five DVD set.

== Plot ==
Agents from the Department of Temporal Investigations (DTI) arrive at Deep Space Nine to question Sisko about an incident involving the Defiant. The ship was sent to Cardassia to retrieve the sacred Bajoran Orb of Time, stolen during the occupation. On their way back to Bajor the ship takes on a passenger, a human trader named Barry Waddle. Suddenly, the ship finds itself more than one hundred years in the past and approximately 200 light years away from its previous location, near Deep Space Station K7 and the USS Enterprise. They discover that the hitchhiker is actually Arne Darvin, a former Klingon agent disguised as a human who was caught by Captain Kirk on K7 after poisoning a shipment of grain.

Fearing that Darvin used the Orb of Time to alter the past to prevent his capture, the crew dress in period uniforms and investigate the Enterprise and K7. The ship and station are infested with tribbles, small furry creatures that reproduce rapidly. They attempt to interact with history as little as possible while searching for Darvin, but Dr. Bashir, Chief O'Brien, Worf and Odo get involved in a bar brawl between the Enterprise crew and a number of Klingons on shore leave. During the brawl, Worf and Odo spot Darvin and bring him back to the Defiant. There, Darvin gloats that he has planted a bomb in a tribble to kill Kirk.

Captain Sisko and Lieutenant Commander Dax infiltrate the Enterprise bridge to scan for the bomb, and confirm it is not on the Enterprise. The rapid breeding of the tribbles makes searching for the bomb on K7 impractical, so they shadow Kirk. They overhear him discussing the tribble infestation, and deduce that the bomb is in the grain storage compartments. They enter the compartments and scan the tribbles, many of which are dead from eating the poisoned grain. Captain Kirk opens the compartment and is covered in falling tribbles. Dax and Sisko find the bomb among the tribbles still in the compartment and the Defiant transports it into space, where it harmlessly explodes. The crew of the Defiant use the Bajoran Orb to return to their time, but not before Sisko takes an opportunity to meet Kirk in person.

The DTI agents, expressing optimism that the crew's actions have not seriously altered history, let Sisko off with just a warning. Once they are gone, Odo summons Sisko to DS9's Promenade, which is now covered in tribbles, much to the annoyance of Quark.

== Production ==
=== Premise and writing ===
As the 30th anniversary of Star Trek was approaching, plans were being made. The film Star Trek: First Contact was entering production, a television special was planned to celebrate the franchise and Original Series actor George Takei had been cast to appear in the Star Trek: Voyager episode "Flashback". Producer Ira Steven Behr later recalled that he thought that Deep Space Nine might not be included as he considered it to be the "middle child" of the franchise. Rick Berman contacted Behr and asked him if he would be interested in doing something to celebrate the anniversary. Behr agreed to discuss it with the staff writers. Initially, there was concern that if the proposed episode aired during the actual anniversary week (around September 8), that it would have to serve as the season opener, preempting the already planned opener.

The writers discussed potential ideas. Ronald D. Moore had previously brought back Original Series character Montgomery Scott for the Star Trek: The Next Generation episode "Relics", and since Takei was appearing in Voyager, they decided that having a member of the main cast from The Original Series return would be repetitive. Some consideration was given by Moore to sending the DS9 crew to revisit the Iotians, as seen on the gangster-themed planet visited by Kirk in the episode "A Piece of the Action". The concept was for the Iotians to have moved on from imitating gangsters to having become huge fans of Captain Kirk and Starfleet. It was intended as a way to honor the dedication of the fan community. René Echevarria suggested a time-travel episode, which was seen as an expensive proposition. Echevarria pressed for the idea. Moore suggested inserting the DS9 crew into "The Trouble with Tribbles", saying it could resolve the question of why a constant stream of tribbles kept hitting Kirk in the head.

When the discussion came to inserting the DS9 crew into the bar-brawl scene, Berman liked the idea but was unsure if it could actually be done. Visual effects supervisor Gary Hutzel created test footage and screened it for Behr and Moore, who thought that it was simply footage from the original episode. Once Hutzel revealed that an additional security officer (played by visual effects camera operator Jim Rider) had been seamlessly added to the sequence, the episode was green-lit. During the scripting process, "The Trouble with Tribbles" was regularly consulted, so the writers could decide where to insert characters. The names of Temporal Agents Dulmur and Lucsly were anagrammed from Mulder and Scully, characters on The X-Files.

Original "Tribbles" creator David Gerrold was contacted by The New York Times, who wanted to interview him about the anniversary and the rumored "tribbles" episode. When he questioned Berman about the episode, Berman initially denied it. Gerrold responded that he did not want to embarrass anyone, but would like to be able to endorse the project. Berman asked what the endorsement would cost, to which Gerrold requested public acknowledgement of his work and to be cast as an extra in the episode. Berman agreed. Gerrold compared inserting new footage into an existing episode to Back to the Future Part II (1989) and later said that he would have gone in a different direction had he written the story. Nonetheless, he said the final product ended up being better than anything he would have created.

=== Directing, cinematography, and music ===
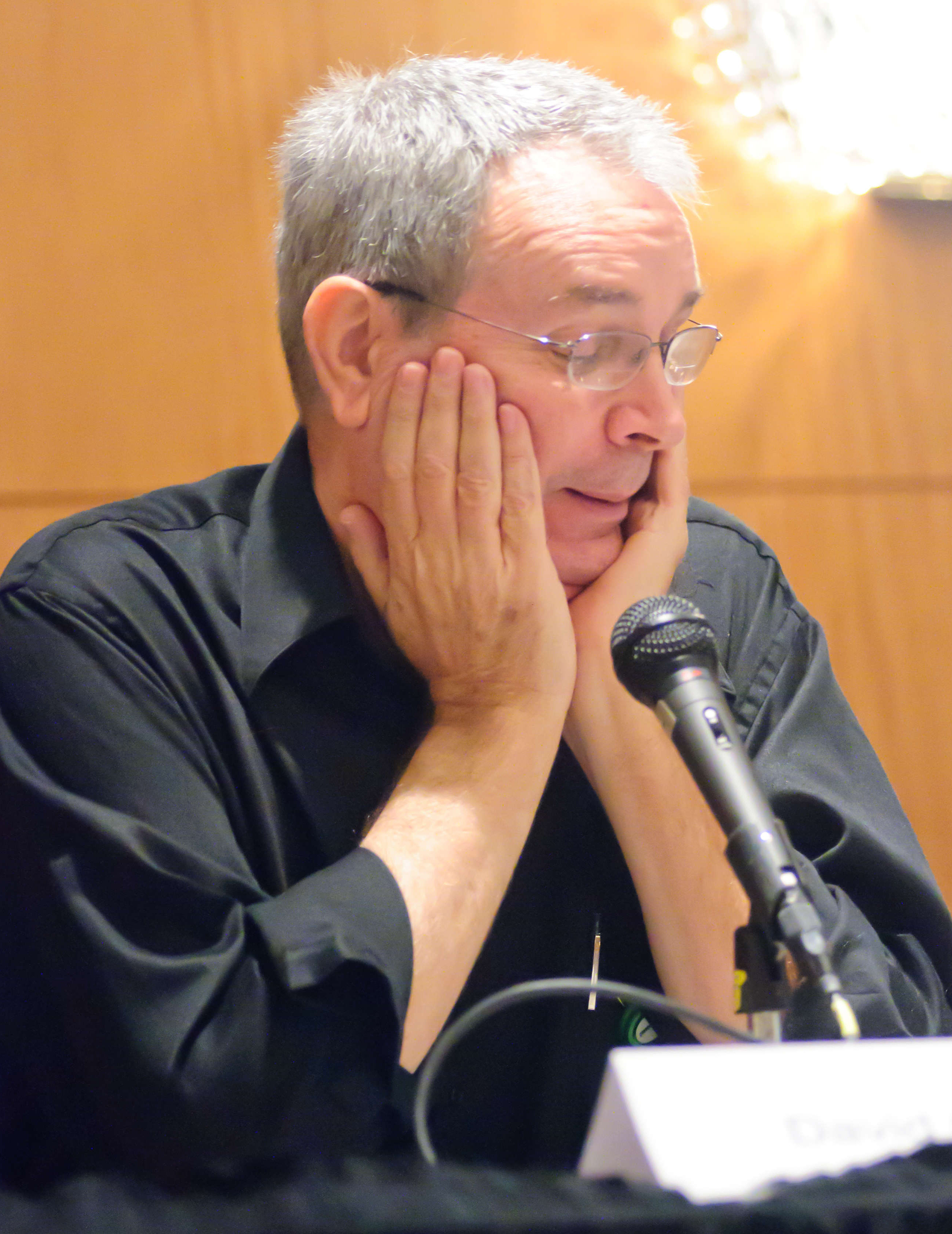
Original tribbles writer David Gerrold helped to make sure the two episodes matched up

Jonathan West was hired to direct the episode after other potential directors were rejected. West had previously been the cinematographer on staff for both Deep Space Nine and The Next Generation, as well as directing several episodes of the franchise. He had nine days of preparation time before shooting began. He sought to match the same production values as The Original Series but found that lighting style and color saturation to film had changed in the intervening years. Visual effects supervisor Dan Curry directed some of the second-unit sequences, and together with West and cinematographer Kris Krosskove worked to rectify these issues. This was achieved by switching to a finer grain of film, using different lenses, as well as by shooting from specific angles. With Gerrold on set as an extra, West used him as an unofficial advisor on matching the scenes from "The Trouble with Tribbles".

The actual digital insertion of actors was conducted in the same manner as seen in the 1994 film Forrest Gump. The original footage was remastered, and was seen as such an improvement that it inspired the subsequent clean-up and re-release of all of "Original Series" episodes. This remaster was conducted by Hutzel and is the first transfer since 1983, when a version was created for VHS and laserdisc release. Hutzel identified 19 scenes from "The Trouble with Tribbles" which were matched in "Trials and Tribble-ations". The scene matching between the new footage and the old took nine weeks to complete with a budget of $3 million. It involved both two-dimensional and three-dimensional tracking shots as well as insertion of matte shots and the use of both blue and green screens for the actors. The scene where Sisko meets Kirk on the bridge toward the end of the episode was taken from the episode "Mirror, Mirror".

Due in part to the special effects, the costuming, the set re-constructions, and the residual payments to The Original Series cast, Behr later described "Trials and Tribble-ations" as "probably the most expensive hour of episodic TV ever produced". The only member of The Original Series cast who was spoken to directly by the producers was Leonard Nimoy, who was enthusiastic about the idea and was surprised that it had taken them so long to come up with it. The remaining cast members were each contacted through Paramount's legal department. Dennis McCarthy wanted to re-work the Jerry Fielding score previously used on "The Trouble with Tribbles". He said that he intended to use the production equipment and orchestra available to bring the score up to the same scale previously seen on Deep Space Nine. However, the producers wanted a new score and so McCarthy explained that he composed it in a Fielding-inspired mindset. The only piece that was directly re-recorded by McCarthy is the Alexander Courage "Theme from Star Trek", which involved a 45-piece orchestra.

=== Design and makeup ===
Art director Randy McIlvain led the set re-creation for the Enterprise and K7, describing the excitement of working on the episode as "contagious". McIlvain spent a fair amount of time getting the window angles correct on the sets. Mike Okuda re-created the graphics seen on the Enterprise sets using a computer, while others were re-drawn by artist Doug Drexler. Some sets were not re-created in full, such as the bridge, parts of which were later added digitally. The captain's chair from the bridge re-creation was later one of the Star Trek items to be auctioned by Christie's. Set designer Laura Richarz watched "The Trouble with Tribbles" carefully looking for small details to replicate on the new sets, such as the legs of benches in the bar on K7. However, she said her biggest challenge was tracking down the chairs seen on the space station. She contacted John M. Dwyer, who had worked on the original episode. He explained to her that the company which created the original chairs had gone out of business. After searching shops selling retro furniture, the production team found a single chair that matched those seen in the original episode. It was purchased and a mold was made to create more chairs. The actors were impressed when they saw the resulting sets, with Terry Farrell exclaiming "Wow, we're on the Enterprise!"

Greg Jein had already been working on a new model of the USS Excelsior for the "Flashback" episode of Voyager when he saw the test footage for "Trials and Tribble-ations". He promised to make a new model of the Enterprise too, but warned that he didn't know when he would have time to do it. He started work on it immediately, and together with his colleagues he not only built a 5.5-foot long (1.7 m) model of the Enterprise, but created a new model of Deep Space Station K7 and the Klingon cruiser as well. The Enterprise model is the first to have been built of the original Star Trek starship in more than 30 years. Other props were also recreated, with around 1,400 tribbles created for the various scenes. They were purchased from Lincoln Enterprises, a company set up by Majel Barrett, widow of Star Trek creator Gene Roddenberry. The rest of the era-specific props were newly created, and were made by Steve Horsch.

"We do not discuss it with outsiders"

— Worf, commenting on his different physical appearance to The Original Series Klingons. Changes in character design between the two series were referred to obliquely, but not directly explained within the episode.

Costume designer Robert Blackman was concerned about the re-creation of the Klingon uniforms seen in The Original Series as he thought that the metallic material used would be nearly impossible to create accurately. He was subsequently relieved to have found four original costumes and an additional shirt in the costume archives, calling them a "godsend". His team created patterns from other costumes to remake them. Makeup supervisor Michael Westmore had previously worked on a television series during the 1960s and recalled what type of makeup was available at the time. He had the team restrict themselves to techniques of that era to ensure that the DS9 crew blended properly into the scenes. The hairstyles of the crew were meant to be reminiscent of The Original Series, with Alexander Siddig sporting a style previously seen on James Doohan. René Auberjonois said that Siddig's new hairstyle reminded him of Jerry Lee Lewis.

=== Filming and casting ===
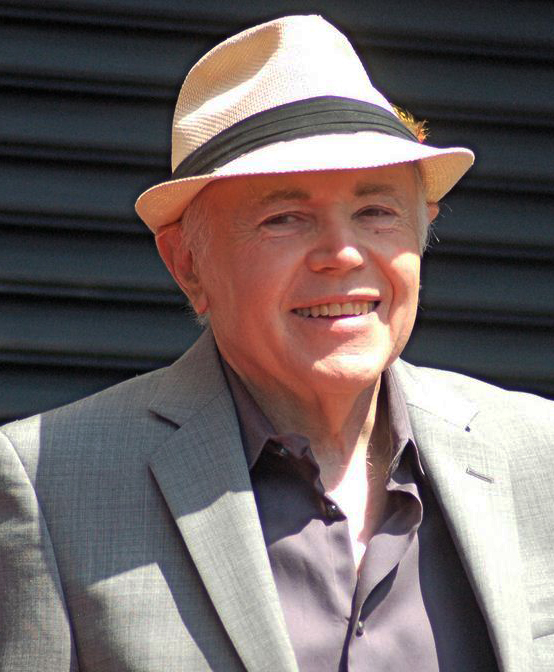
Walter Koenig showed the DS9 actors how to use TOS-era control panels

The cast and crew were enthusiastic on set, with editor Steve Tucker calling it a "giddy party". Behr said of the cast and crew in the episode: "They all were having fun. Just sitting on those sets, being on that bridge, it was a hoot, a real hoot." Deirdre L. Imershein was brought in at the last minute to play Lt. Watley, as she was a friend of one of the production crew and had previously appeared as a Risan pleasure girl in The Next Generation episode "Captain's Holiday". She was brought in because none of the actresses the producers had seen during the casting process could say the role's one line ("Deck 15") convincingly enough. Her involvement led to the expansion of the role into a second scene where she was revealed to possibly be Bashir's great-grandmother.

Charlie Brill returned to film new scenes as Klingon agent Arne Darvin, while original series writer Gerrold was allowed to appear as an extra in two scenes as a crewman from the Enterprise. In one of those scenes, he was holding an original tribble from "The Trouble with Tribbles". Walter Koenig taught the DS9 actors how the consoles were operated on the Enterprise. Koenig later commented that he was paid eight times as much for this and the residual payment as he had been for the original episode. A string of other visitors came to the set during filming, including Majel Barrett and former The Next Generation producer (and TOS co-producer) Bob Justman.

== Reception ==
Before the episode was shown, a half-hour special was shown on the Sci Fi Channel about the making of "Trials and Tribble-ations" on November 2, 1996. Paramount also promoted the episode by arranging the placement of around 250,000 tribbles in subways and buses across the United States. It received Nielsen ratings of 7.7%, placing it in sixth place in the timeslot. It is the most watched episode of the fifth season during its initial broadcast. The last time the series had received similar ratings was nearly a year earlier with season four's "Little Green Men".

Two reviewers watched the episode for Tor.com in 2010. Torie Atkinson described "Trials and Tribble-ations" as a "perfect episode", and "one of the best Star Trek episodes ever made, in any series." She praised the humor and the references, and found Dax as a stand-in for fans of The Original Series. She gave the episode a score of six out of six. Eugene Myers wasn't disappointed following the hype about the episode, saying that it was "steeped in nostalgia". He thought that the bomb-in-a-tribble plot was ingenious and allowed the episode to step outside of merely being good due to the success of "The Trouble with Tribbles". His favorite scene was the constant stream of tribbles hitting Kirk on the head because Sisko and Dax were throwing them out of the grain compartment while looking for the bomb. He also gave the episode a score of six out of six. Keith R.A. DeCandido reviewed the episode for Tor.com in 2014; he also gave the episode a favorable review, with a score of ten out of ten.

In his review for The A.V. Club, Zack Handlen called the episode a "delight" and a "lark". He thought that having Brill film new scenes showed some continuity between the old and the new, and that the special effects worked well enough. He summed it up by saying: "It's not tightly plotted, and once the initial rush of nostalgia fades, there isn't a lot of depth or suspense to replace it. But there are laughs, more than enough to justify the experiment, and the nostalgia never fades away entirely." In the book Deep Space and Sacred Time: Star Trek in the American Mythos, Jon Wagner and Jan Lundeen compared the temporal agents seen in "Trials and Tribble-ations" to the police detectives seen in the television series Dragnet. Gem Wheeler, in her list of the best episodes of Deep Space Nine for website Den of Geek, listed "Trials and Tribble-ations" as the sixth best. In a list of the top 100 episodes of the Star Trek franchise, "Trials and Tribble-ations" was placed in 32nd place by Charlie Jane Anders at io9.

"Trials and Tribble-ations" was nominated for, but did not win, three Creative Arts Emmy Awards in the Outstanding Art Direction for a Series, Outstanding Hairstyling for a Series, and Outstanding Special Visual Effects. It was also nominated for the Hugo Award for Best Dramatic Presentation, as "The Trouble with Tribbles" had been in 1968.

"Trials and Tribble-ations" was the winner of a 2012 poll conducted on the official Star Trek website to determine the best episode of Deep Space Nine. A 2015 binge-watching guide for Star Trek: Deep Space Nine by Wired recommended this episode as essential. In 2016, The Hollywood Reporter ranked this episode as the 17th best of Star Trek: Deep Space Nine. SyFy ranked "Trials and Tribble-ations" as the third best time travel plot in Star Trek in 2016. Empire ranked "Trials and Tribble-ations" 18th out of the 50 top episodes of all Star Trek in 2016. At that time, there were roughly 726 episodes and a dozen films released.

In 2017, SyFy listed this episode as one of the best of Star Trek: Deep Space Nine. In 2018, SyFy included this episode on their binge-watching guide of Jadzia Dax. In 2018, Vulture ranked this episode the fourth best of Star Trek: Deep Space Nine. In 2018, CBR ranked this episode the third best time-travel episode of all Star Trek. In 2019, CBR ranked this episode the fifth best episode of Star Trek: Deep Space Nine. In 2019, Nerdist ranked this episode the third best time-travel episode of all Star Trek television. In 2020, Screen Rant ranked this episode the second best episode of all Star Trek franchise television episodes.

== Home media release ==
The tie-in novelization of "Trials and Tribble-ations" was written by Diane Carey and published by Pocket Books. In 1998, a "Talking Tribble Gift Set" was released containing both "The Trouble with Tribbles" and "Trials and Tribble-ations" on VHS. "Trials and Tribble-ations" was first released in the normal run of VHS issues as part of a two episode cassette alongside "The Assignment" in the United Kingdom on October 1, 1999. A single episode release followed in the United States and Canada on July 10, 2001. It was released on DVD as part of the season five box set on October 7, 2003.

The season 2 remastered DVD set of The Original Series includes "Trials and Tribble-ations", special features for the episode, "The Trouble with Tribbles", and "More Tribbles, More Troubles" from Star Trek: The Animated Series.
