= The Trouble with Tribbles =

- Star Trek: The Original Series episode
- Captain Kirk, up to his chest in tribbles
- Episode no.: Season 2 Episode 15
- Directed by: Joseph Pevney
- Written by: David Gerrold
- Cinematography by: Jerry Finnerman
- Production code: 042
- Original air date: December 29, 1967

Guest appearances
- William Schallert – Under-Secretary Nilz Baris; William Campbell – Captain Koloth; Stanley Adams – Cyrano Jones; Whit Bissell – Station Manager Lurry; Michael Pataki – Korax; Ed Reimers – Admiral Fitzpatrick; Charlie Brill – Arne Darvin; Paul Baxley – Ensign Freeman; Eddie Paskey – Guard; David L. Ross – Guard; Guy Raymond – Trader

Episode chronology
← Previous "Wolf in the Fold"	Next → "The Gamesters of Triskelion"
- Star Trek: The Original Series season 2

"The Trouble with Tribbles" is the fifteenth episode of the second season of the American science fiction television series Star Trek. Written by David Gerrold and directed by Joseph Pevney, it was first broadcast on December 29, 1967. In this comic episode, the starship Enterprise visits a space station that soon becomes overwhelmed by rapidly reproducing small furry creatures called "tribbles".

It is claimed the short story "Pigs Is Pigs" by Ellis Parker Butler inspired the episode, but strong similarities to sections of the novel The Rolling Stones led the producers to seek a waiver from author Robert A. Heinlein. Heinlein himself, in a letter to Gerrold, noted that they "both owe something to Ellis Parker Butler ... and possibly to Noah."

The original episode has had several produced follow-ups. The first, "More Tribbles, More Troubles", was originally pitched for the show's third season but not accepted; it was ultimately produced for Star Trek: The Animated Series. To celebrate the 30th anniversary of Star Trek in 1996, the Star Trek: Deep Space Nine episode "Trials and Tribble-ations" used digital techniques to insert the Deep Space Nine actors into the events of "The Trouble with Tribbles".

== Plot ==
The Enterprise is summoned to Deep Space Station K7 by undersecretary Nilz Baris to guard a shipment of quadrotriticale grain. Captain James Kirk is annoyed at Baris's use of a high-priority distress call for a seemingly trivial matter, and complies minimally. The Enterprise crew enjoy shore leave on the station, as does the crew of a Klingon ship under the command of Captain Koloth.

Interstellar trader Cyrano Jones arrives with goods for sale, among them purring balls of fluff called tribbles. He gives one to Lt. Uhura, who takes it aboard the Enterprise. On both the Enterprise and the station, the tribbles begin reproducing rapidly. They make soothing cooing noises and are loved by the Enterprise crew, even the stoic Spock. However, tribbles jump and screech in disgust when around Klingons.

On the station, a drunken Klingon insults the Enterprise, her crew, and her captain. The resulting brawl between humans and Klingons forces Kirk to cancel shore leave. Baris is terrified of possible Klingon interference with the grain project, and suspects Jones of being a Klingon agent.

Doctor Leonard McCoy and Spock are concerned that the increasing number of tribbles threatens to consume all the food aboard the Enterprise. Kirk realizes that the tribbles on the station could be a threat to the grain shipment. He is too late, however; when he opens an overhead storage compartment, he is buried chest-deep in grain-gorged tribbles. Spock and McCoy discover that many of the tribbles in the hold are dead or dying, suggesting the grain has been poisoned.

Infuriated, Baris vows to see Kirk punished for the fiasco, while an equally outraged Koloth demands an apology from Kirk for what he considers disrespectful treatment of his crew. Their arguments are cut short, however, when Baris's assistant Arne Darvin walks into the room and the tribbles react as if in the presence of a Klingon. McCoy reveals Darvin to be a Klingon disguised as a human; Darvin confesses to having poisoned the grain.

Jones is ordered to remove the tribbles from the station (a task that Spock estimates will take 17.9 years), or he may face charges for transporting dangerous life-forms. Just before the Klingons depart, all the tribbles aboard the Enterprise are transported onto the Klingon vessel's engine room by Chief Engineer Scott, where, in his words, "they'll be no tribble at all."

== Production ==
=== Writing ===
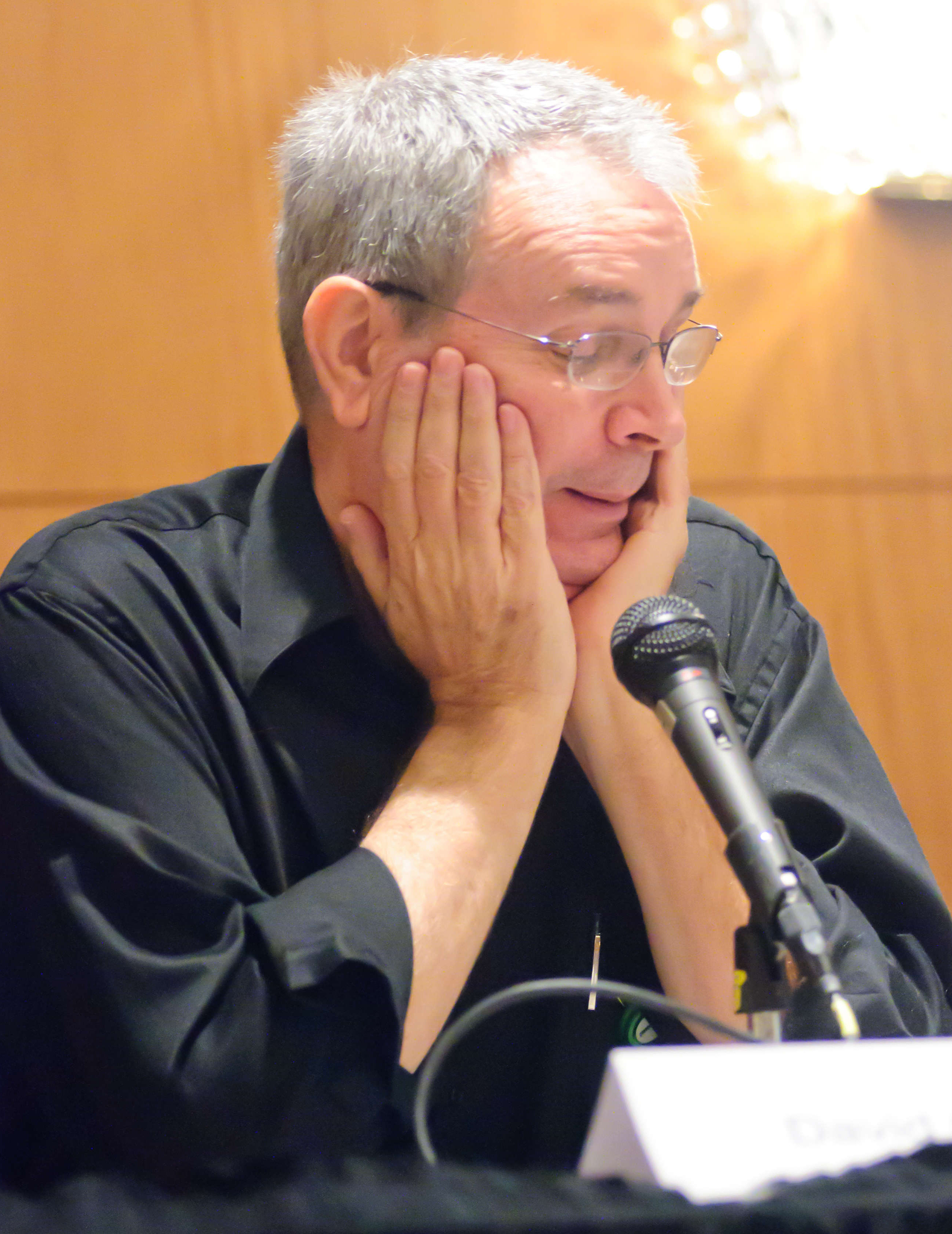
"The Trouble with Tribbles" was the first sale of writer David Gerrold (photographed in 2010).

The episode was the first professional work of writer David Gerrold, and went through a variety of drafts before it reached the screen. Because his typewriter used a less common, smaller size font, an approved screenplay version needed to be reduced by twenty pages before filming.

Gerrold had been a fan of science fiction since he was a child. When Star Trek was first broadcast, he was concerned that it might turn into something similar to Lost in Space, which he has described as "one full-color hour of trash reaching into millions of homes". His first story outline was sent in to Star Trek after his agent suggested that he wait until the shows started to air under the theory that the show might drop an existing episode in favor of a better script. The story was entitled "Tomorrow Was Yesterday" (not to be confused with the Star Trek episode "Tomorrow Is Yesterday") and concerned the Enterprise coming across a generation ship which had degenerated into a two-tier class system. His agent received a rejection letter from producer Gene L. Coon dated October 3, 1966. The letter stated that the "outline was by no means inadequate. It is, as a matter of fact, very adequate." It went on to say that it would require a budget larger than that available to television, but would have made a good film treatment. Coon offered to meet with Gerrold and explain what they were looking for, because they were not purchasing scripts at that time.

Coon suggested that Gerrold should wait until the following February to see if the show was renewed for a second season. They also discussed several story ideas, including some small furry creatures that bred too quickly. Coon thought it was a cute idea but would be too expensive as they'd have to build each creature. In preparation for the second series submission, by January, Gerrold had put together five premises to pitch. He had his best hopes on two treatments called "Bandi" and "The Protracted Man", but decided to submit his fifth story despite Coon's earlier dismissal of the idea. It was called "The Fuzzies". The idea was based on the introduction of rabbits in Australia in 1859, whose population grew extraordinarily fast owing to a lack of predators.

The initial premise placed the story on a space station to avoid the ecological damage that the creatures would have on a planet. However, Gerrold's agent was concerned that requiring a miniature of the station to be built as well as the additional sets would cause it to be too expensive for a single episode. Because of his agent's comments, Gerrold modified the pitch to place the action on a colony planet instead. This pitch included the plot points such as the creatures getting into a poisoned grain storage, but omitted the Klingons; and Cyrano Jones was called Cyrano Smith. The five pitches were submitted by Gerrold's agent in February 1967, and received a response in June. At the time the show had already purchased too many scripts for the second season, but story editor D. C. Fontana suggested that they should purchase the story and assign it to a staff writer as it was better than some of the other stories they already had.

At the time that Coon got in touch, Gerrold had just been employed at CBS as a typist working on scripts such as the pilot of Hawaii Five-O. As soon as he got the response, he quit the job. Gerrold and Coon met once more, and revealed that the network had recently made a request for more episodes based on other planets. Coon told Gerrold to work up a further pitch. This version of the story added the Klingons, and moved the action from planetside to a space station. During a visit to the set, Gerrold had the opportunity to speak to Leonard Nimoy and ask his advice on how to write for Spock and was allowed to watch the dailies from each day's shoot of the episode "The Doomsday Machine" which was being filmed at the time. This version of the story was entitled "A Fuzzy Thing Happened to Me...", which was purchased by Coon as a plot outline. He offered Gerrold a chance to write the script himself, by promising not to hand it to another writer for a month. However, Coon made it clear that he was not offering Gerrold a script assignment, but was giving him the option of submitting a draft.

Gerrold turned around the first draft script in two and a half days. Both Coon and associate producer Robert Justman gave feedback on the script, and pointed out a few gaps such as there needing to be some way in the plot for the crew to discover that Darvin was a Klingon agent. The following draft had Cyrano Jones discover that Darvin was an agent, which Coon thought was not "punchy" enough. It was then re-written so that the fuzzies were allergic to Klingons. Both Gerrold and Coon thought the idea was "trite... shtick... hokey" and "had been done before". but Coon agreed that it was the direction the story should go. The re-write of the script took a further week.

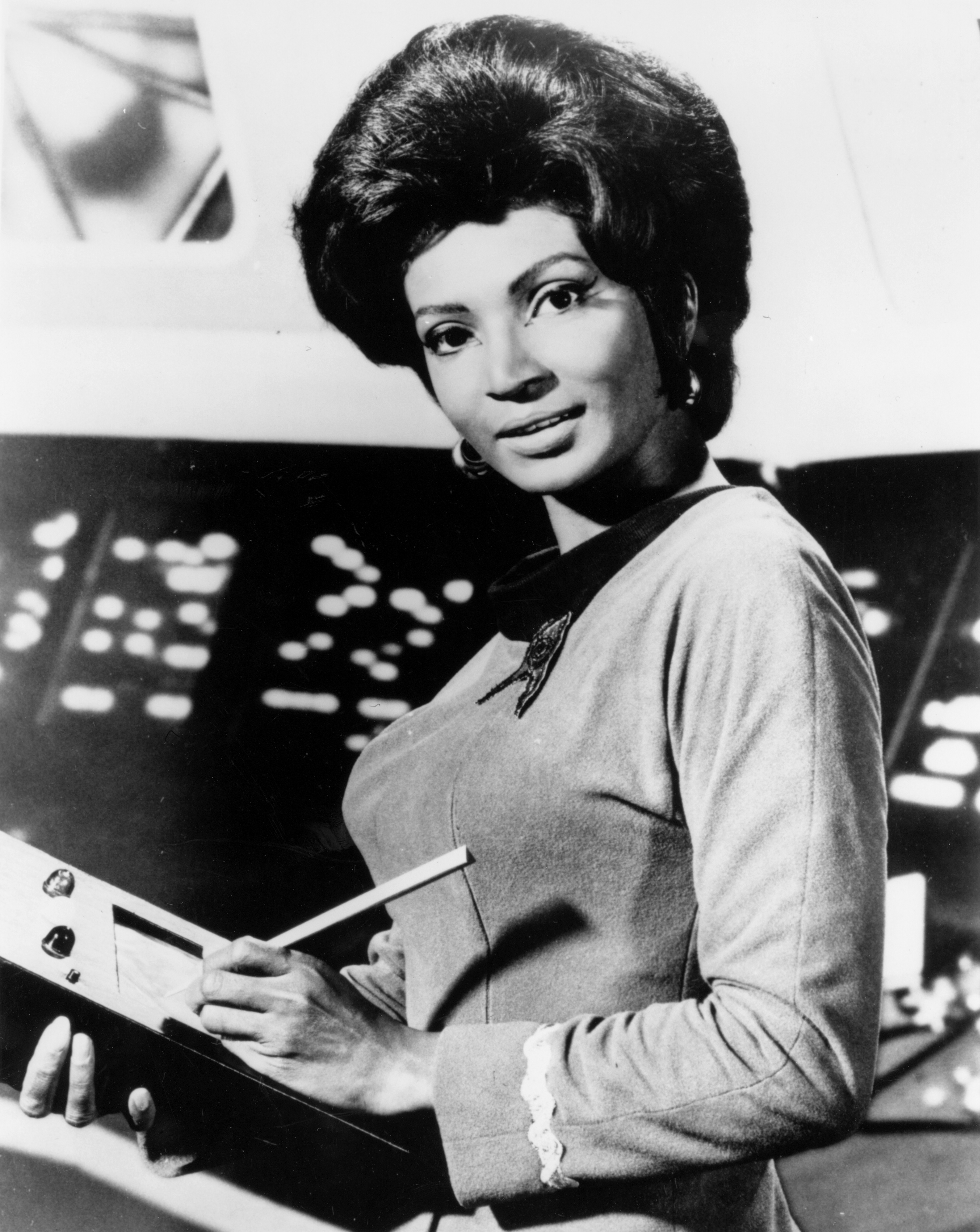
Nichelle Nichols said that she had never seen a script changed so much but stay the same.

On a further visit to the set, Gerrold was called into Coon's office. He was informed that he needed to change the name of the fuzzies, as the legal department was concerned about similarities in the name with H. Beam Piper's 1962 novel Little Fuzzy. He subsequently came up with a variety of alternative names. Through a process of elimination, he ended up with the name "tribble". Gerrold's submitted script was within the standard page count for an episode, but, when it was retyped for distribution by the production's mimeo department, it ballooned from 60 to 80 pages due to Gerrold's having used a typewriter with 12-pitch Elite rather than the 10 characters per inch Pica standard of the TV and film industry. This meant that some twenty pages needed to be cut from the script. Coon's participation in terms of suggestions and edits was such that Gerrold thought he should have been given a co-writing credit.

Scenes which were cut from the script included the Enterprise chasing after Jones in his vessel, and resulted in the scene where Kirk has tribbles tumbling onto him while in the grain locker. Gerrold felt that this enforced editing process "tightened up the story and made for a better series of gags". Nichelle Nichols said to Gerrold "I've never seen a script go through so many changes – and stay so much the same".

During script development the Kellam de Forest Research firm cautioned that the tribbles and the events involving them strongly resembled the Martian flat cats in Robert A. Heinlein's 1952 novel The Rolling Stones, and suggested that the rights to the novel should be purchased. Gerrold became concerned that he had inadvertently plagiarized the novel which he had read fifteen years before. Coon phoned Heinlein, who, according to Gerrold, only asked for a signed copy of the script and later sent a note to Gerrold after the show aired to thank him for the script. The producers liked the resulting script so much that Gerrold was later tasked with re-writing the script for "I, Mudd".

Heinlein’s own recollections were at odds with this account. In his authorized biography Heinlein said he was called by Gene Coon who gave him a "sob story" about the issue and asked him to waive claim to the "similarity" to his flat cats. Heinlein states he agreed because he’d just been through one costly plagiarism lawsuit against Roger Corman and did not wish to embroil himself in another "chump's game". He had misgivings upon seeing the actual script but let it go, an action he later regretted: "If that matter had simply been dropped after that one episode was filmed, I would have chalked it up wryly to experience. But the 'nice kid' did not drop it; 'tribbles' (i.e. my 'flat cats') have been exploited endlessly... Well that’s one that did 'larn me.' Today if J. Christ phoned me on some matter of business, I would simply tell him: 'See my agent.'"

=== Filming ===
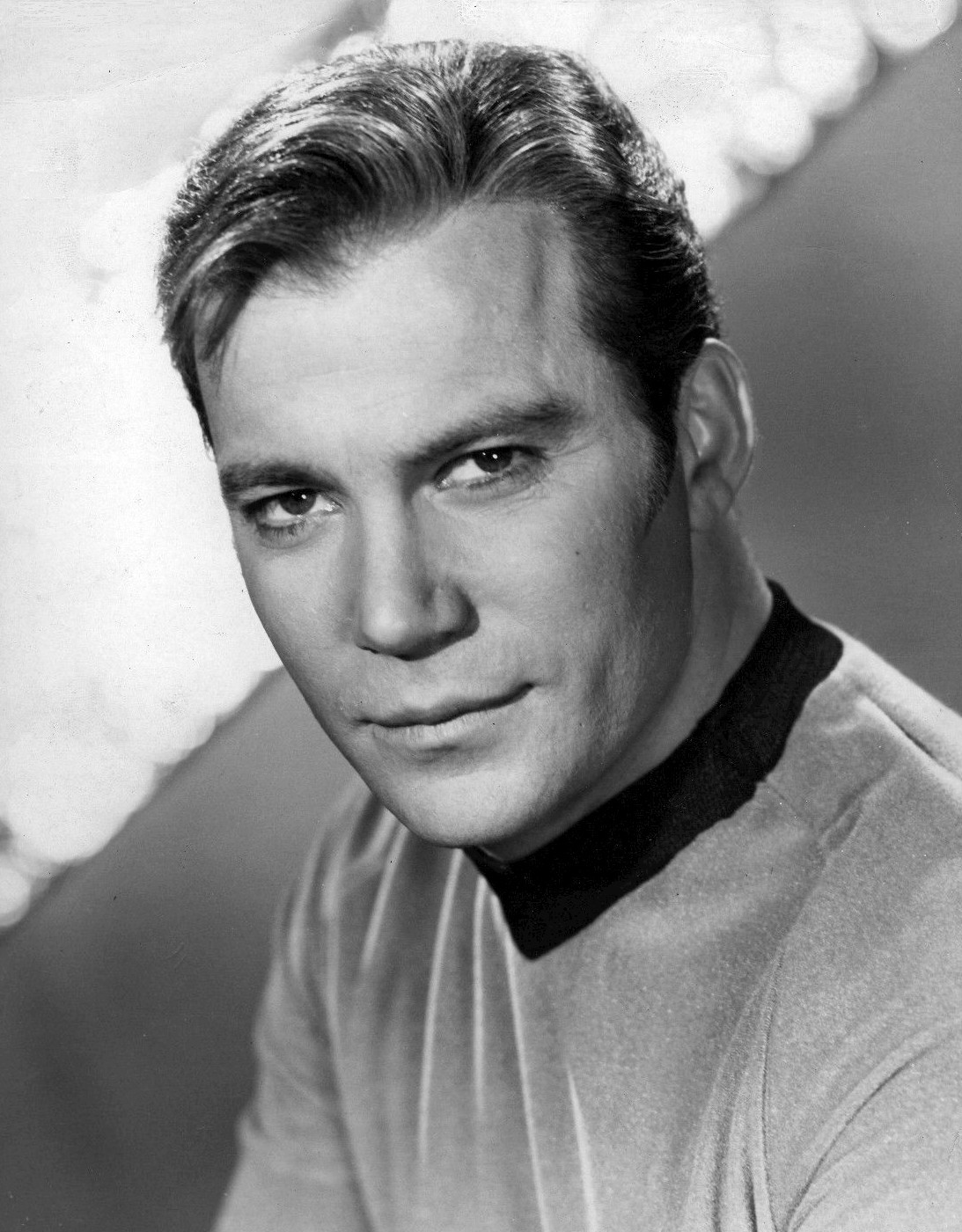
During the course of filming, William Shatner was covered with five hundred tribbles on eight occasions.

The use of live animals to represent the tribbles was immediately ruled out. According to Gerrold's account, as their similarity to Heinlein's flat cats was not yet discovered, the inspiration for the form of the tribble instead came from a fluffy keyring owned by Holly Sherman. Sherman's Planet in this episode was subsequently named after her. The design came from Wah Chang, but they were individually sewn by Jacqueline Cumeré. She was paid $350 to sew five hundred tribbles from synthetic fur and stuff them with foam rubber. Six ambulatory tribbles were made using the mechanisms of walking toy dogs, which were quite noisy and required the dialogue to be looped in during editing. Other tribbles were created by Jim Rugg out of beanbags for when it was required for one to sit on a person or object, and the breathing tribbles were hollow with surgical balloons inserted. Some of these tribbles were later displayed at the Smithsonian National Air and Space Museum in Washington D.C. in 1992. The sale at Christie's auction house in 2006 included tribbles from this episode as part of a larger Star Trek sale. Because of the synthetic fur technology of the 1960s, relatively few original tribbles exist as of 2010 because the fur fell out over time and they went bald. An original tribble was sold at auction in 2003 for $1,000.

Filming began during the second week of August 1967. Three temporary sets and a portion of corridor were constructed for specific use in this episode, which included the large trading post set. The chairs in that set were a problem, as the set designers wanted 24 matching chairs and decided that folding ones would not do. John M. Dwyer sourced them from a local company, but the numbers required meant that they had to be pulled out of showrooms from all over the county. When it came to the fight scene in the episode, Dwyer warned director Joseph Pevney not to damage the chairs. That scene was filmed twice after a cameraman with a handheld camera wandered onto the set. The scene where Kirk is covered with tribbles in the grain container needed to be filmed eight times, using all five hundred sewn tribbles. Gerrold had expected that scene to be cut at some point during production, as he thought that William Shatner would not agree to it. He said that Shatner was the "consummate professional and I believe he was eager to show off his comic abilities". The scene was later described as "solidifying 'The Trouble with Tribbles' in the pop culture lexicon".

Pevney was pleased with the outcome of the shoot, calling the episode "a delightful show from beginning to end". In addition to directing, Pevney also sourced some of the parts to create the tribbles and was directly responsible for the casting of Stanley Adams. He had pushed for the episode to be made as he recalled that there was some resistance at the time against making a comedy-style episode. These types of episodes were unusual for the series, as only "The Trouble with Tribbles" and "A Piece of the Action" were considered to be comedic episodes from season two. Pevney was one of the two most prolific Original Series directors alongside Marc Daniels, and directed fourteen episodes of the show. The cast responded favorably to the script. Nichelle Nichols was particularly pleased as it allowed Uhura to be a woman and took her off the bridge. It was one of her largest roles in any single episode in the series.

The special effects design for the K-7 Space Station in the episode was based on actual 1959 design by Douglas Aircraft Corporation for the space station.

=== Casting ===
William Campbell had previously appeared in the first season episode "The Squire of Gothos" as Trelane. In "The Trouble with Tribbles", he portrayed the Klingon Captain Koloth. At various points Star Trek creator Gene Roddenberry claimed it was his intention to bring back Koloth during the third season of The Original Series, as Kirk's recurring Klingon adversary. Some internal production documents contradict this story. Although Koloth returned in Star Trek: The Animated Series, Campbell did not voice the role. He returned to the role in 1994 for an episode of Star Trek: Deep Space Nine, entitled "Blood Oath".

At the time of casting, William Schallert had just finished filming the ABC sitcom The Patty Duke Show. He described himself as not a fan, and had not read any science fiction since 1948. He thought that the role of Nilz Baris was just another guest spot, and considered Baris to be just "a rather stuffy bureaucrat, not the most appealing character". He did not remember the character's name, only learning it when he first attended a Star Trek convention at a hotel near Los Angeles Airport, as the fans called it out when he entered the lobby. He was later cast in the role of the Bajoran musician Varani in the DS9 episode "Sanctuary".

Whit Bissell, who played the station manager, Lurry, was better known at the time in the main cast role of Lt. Gen. Heywood Kirk in the ABC science fiction television series The Time Tunnel. Michael Pataki, who portrayed the Klingon Korax, went on to play Karnas in Star Trek: The Next Generation first season episode "Too Short a Season". Charlie Brill portrayed the Klingon agent Arne Darvin. Brill had previously been a sketch comedy artist with his wife Mitzi McCall, and had appeared on The Ed Sullivan Show when The Beatles made their first appearance.

== Reception ==
While initial fan reaction to the episode was mixed, it was more popular with the general public. Critical response to the episode was positive, and it was nominated for the Hugo Award for Best Dramatic Presentation which instead went to fellow Star Trek episode "The City on the Edge of Forever". It has since been included in several "best of" episode lists and features, including as part of the Best of DVD collection alongside three other episodes. It has also been released as part of the season two DVD box set.

=== Broadcast ===
"The Trouble with Tribbles" was first broadcast in the United States on December 29, 1967 on NBC. The initial fan reaction was undecided, but the episode connected better with the mass market. This effect was later explained in 2012 when Jordon Hoffman on StarTrek.com described "The Trouble with Tribbles" as "quite possibly, the first episode of Star Trek you ever saw". It entered popular culture and remained well-known to the public outside of the Star Trek community.

=== Retrospective critiques ===
The New York Times described the scene with Kirk and the tribbles in the grain container as one of the "best-remembered moments" of the series. Time magazine ranked "The Trouble with Tribbles" as the sixth best moment in Star Trek. IGN ranked it as the fifth best episode of The Original Series, while TechRepublic ranked it as the fourth best. The A.V. Club included "The Trouble with Tribbles" in a list of ten must-see episodes, and USA Today listed it as one of the three best. In 1998, "The Trouble with Tribbles" was listed as the eighth best cult moment of all time by The Times newspaper. In a list of the top 100 episodes of the Star Trek franchise, "The Trouble with Tribbles" was placed sixth by Charlie Jane Anders at io9.

Zack Handlen's July 2009 review for The A.V. Club gave the episode a grade of A. Cyrano Jones was Handlen's least favorite part of the episode, and with the exception of that character, it was one of the better scripts seen in The Original Series. He thought that despite the lack of a sense of real danger, the plot all comes together neatly and praised the story's effects on Kirk, saying "The way the episode unfolds means Kirk's constantly dealing with things he does not really want to deal with, and there's a surprising amount of enjoyment to be had in seeing him complain about it to Spock."

Michele Erica Green, writing for TrekNation in March 2006, said she thought that the episode would have been dated, but found it was "as funny as ever." She thought that Scotty's lines were "unforgettable" and the scenes between McCoy and Spock were "priceless". Eugene Myers and Torie Atkinson reviewed the episode for Tor.com in April 2010. They described it as "easily the most celebrated episode of the entire Original Series (if not the whole franchise)". They went on to describe it as a "perfect episode", and both gave it maximum scores of six out of six.

In 2009, Time rated "The Trouble with Tribbles" as one of the top ten moments of Star Trek, including television series and films up to that time. In 2017, Space.com ranked "The Trouble with Tribbles" the second best episode of all Star Trek television, including all Star Trek television series episodes prior to Star Trek: Discovery. Io9 ranked it as the sixth best episode of all Star Trek episodes, including later series, up to 2011.

In 2012, The A.V. Club ranked this episode as one of the top ten "must see" episodes of The Original Series.

In 2013, The Hollywood Reporter ranked Kirk being buried in tribbles as one of the top 15 key moments of The Original Series. They remark "the image of Kirk mired in a pile of adorable fur balls has solidified "The Trouble of Tribbles" in the pop culture lexicon."

In 2012, The Christian Science Monitor ranked this the fourth best episode of the original Star Trek.

In 2013, Wired magazine ranked this episode one of the top ten episodes of The Original Series.

In 2015, Wired recommended not skipping this episode in their binge-watching guide for The Original Series.

In 2015, the New York Public Library described this episode as having Spock's sixth best scene in the show.

In 2015, this episode was included in Geek.com's 35 greatest moments in Star Trek— they ranked Kirk's getting buried in tribbles the 29th greatest moment of all Star Trek.

2016 was the 50th anniversary of the first broadcast of Star Trek, which triggered a large amount of press including TV Guide's review of top Original Series episodes. They ranked this episode the 5th best of the series.

In 2016, Business Insider ranked "The Trouble with Tribbles" the third best episode of The Original Series. In the same year, Newsweek ranked "The Trouble With Tribbles" as one of the best episodes of The Original Series.

In 2016, IGN ranked this episode the fifth best in a top ten list of The Original Series episodes. They ranked it the ninth best out of all Star Trek series prior to Star Trek: Discovery.

Empire ranked "The Trouble With Tribbles" 8th out of the top 50 episodes of all Star Trek in 2016. At that time, there were roughly 726 episodes and a dozen films released.

In 2016, Vox rated this one of the top 25 essential episodes of all Star Trek.

In 2017, Radio Times ranked this episode the fourth best episode of Star Trek, especially for those unfamiliar with the franchise. In 2016, Radio Times also ranked this episode as having the 13th best moment in all Star Trek, pointing out several scenes, but especially the one where Kirk is buried under a mound of tribbles.

In 2017, Space.com ranked this episode the second best episode of all Star Trek franchise television, and praised the hilarity of the scene where Kirk gets a tribble shower.

In 2017, Business Insider ranked "The Trouble with Tribbles" the third best episode of The Original Series.

In 2017, Vulture listed it as one of the best episodes of the original show, noting the episode's comedic elements.

In 2018, Collider ranked this episode the 5th best Original Series episode.

In 2018, PopMatters ranked this the 12th best episode of The Original Series.

A 2018 Star Trek binge-watching guide by Den of Geek, recommended this episode as one of the best of The Original Series.

In 2019, CBR ranked this episode as one of the top eight most memorable episodes of the original Star Trek.

In 2019, Screen Rant ranked this the ninth best episode of all Star Trek series produced up to that time.

== Awards ==
The episode was nominated for Best Dramatic Presentation at the 1968 Hugo Awards. All of the nominees that year were episodes of Star Trek, with the award instead going to "The City on the Edge of Forever". From the number of votes, "The Trouble with Tribbles" was placed second.

== Home media release ==
"The Trouble with Tribbles" was one of the first episodes to receive an official release by Paramount Home Entertainment. In 1980, it was released on VHS on a two-episode tape alongside "Let That Be Your Last Battlefield". It was re-released in 1991 as part of the first full-season release on VHS. This was re-released in 1993, and was released on LaserDisc. In 1998, a "Talking Tribble Gift Set" was released which contained both "The Trouble with Tribbles" and "Trials and Tribble-ations" on VHS. The first DVD release was in 2000, when all of The Original Series episodes were released in individual releases of two episodes per disc. The first season set that the episode was included in was a part of the season two DVD set released in the United States on November 2, 2004.

In 2009, it was included in a best of collection with three other episodes of The Original Series alongside "Amok Time", "The City on the Edge of Forever" and "Balance of Terror". The re-mastered DVD sets were also re-launched to coincide with the release of the film, Star Trek. The Blu-ray release included the un-changed scenes as alternative angles. Disc four of each set contained only "The Trouble with Tribbles" from The Original Series but otherwise contained tribble related extras. These included both "More Tribbles, More Troubles" and "Trials and Tribble-ations".

== Legacy ==
=== "More Tribbles, More Troubles" ===
"The Trouble with Tribbles" was originally intended to have a follow-up episode during season three, but after Gene Roddenberry stepped back from the production of the show after a time-slot change and further cuts in the budget, the idea was scrapped. In 1973, Gerrold had become friends with D. C. Fontana from their time spent on the Star Trek convention circuit together. He had heard about Star Trek: The Animated Series, and offered to do an episode. Fontana responded that she wanted the tribble episode that was cut from season three. This episode was entitled "More Tribbles, More Troubles". The episode introduces the natural predator of the tribbles and genetically engineered tribbles which no longer reproduce but instead grow much larger. As with his other Animated Series episode "Bem", he later explained that almost nothing was cut from the original pitches for the third season of The Original Series as animation played out quicker and so everything still fit into the episode despite the reduced running time. Both of Gerrold's Animated Series episodes were novelized by Alan Dean Foster, and Gerrold later said that he thought that he did "a fine job".

=== "Trials and Tribble-ations" ===
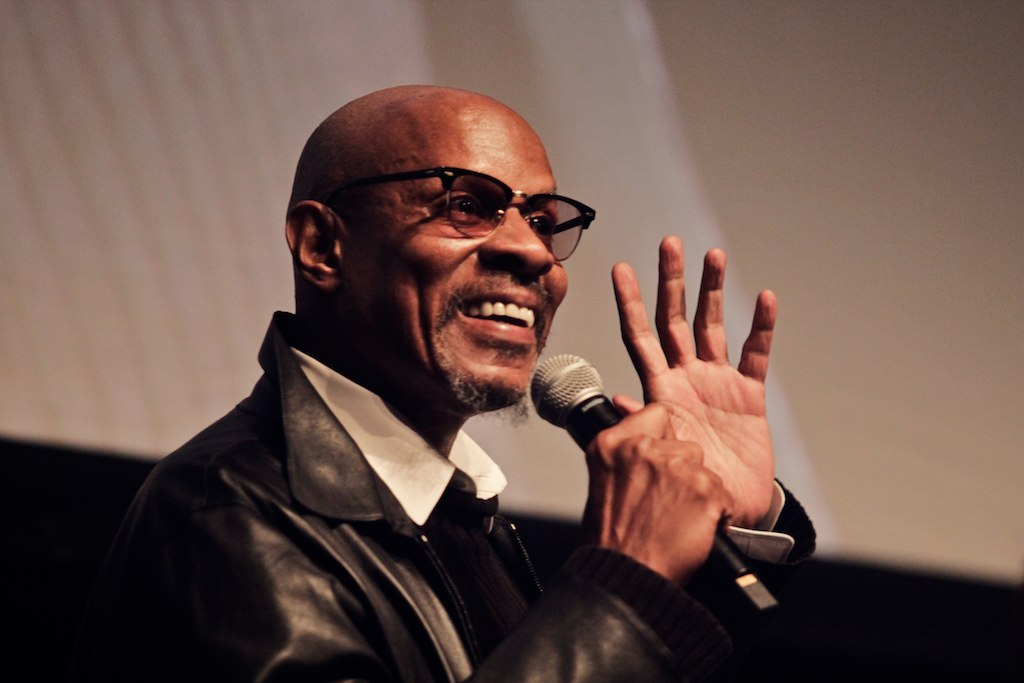
Actors such as Avery Brooks were digitally inserted into scenes from "The Trouble with Tribbles" for the DS9 episode

To celebrate the 30th anniversary of Star Trek in 1996, producers of Star Trek: Voyager and Star Trek: Deep Space Nine decided to incorporate elements of The Original Series into episodes. The Deep Space Nine homage, entitled "Trials and Tribble-ations", sent its characters back in time to the events of "The Trouble with Tribbles", digitally inserting the Deep Space Nine actors into footage from nineteen scenes in "The Trouble with Tribbles" and other episodes. Charlie Brill also returned to the role of Arne Darvin to film new scenes set in the DS9 timeframe. The episode was nominated for three Emmy Awards and, like the original episode, the Hugo Award for Best Dramatic Presentation.

As the 30th anniversary approached, Gerrold had heard rumors of a tribble sequel in the works but had only heard denials from executive producer Rick Berman. Following an interview request from The New York Times, he telephoned Berman once more to ask what was happening as he did not want to say he did not know about the sequel episode and embarrass anyone if it actually was going to happen. Gerrold suggested that an acknowledgement of the creator of the tribbles might be in order and asked if he could be an extra. He appears in the episode as an Enterprise officer. While Gerrold was on set, he also advised director Jonathan West on the integration of new scenes into "The Trouble with Tribbles". Gerrold later said that "Trials and Tribble-ations" "turned out beautiful. I think it was the best episode of Deep Space Nine ever and possibly the best episode of Star Trek after the Original Series."

=== Further appearances and parodies ===
Tribbles have been further seen in other Star Trek episodes and films, including Star Trek III: The Search for Spock and the J. J. Abrams-helmed films Star Trek (2009) and Star Trek Into Darkness (2013). While on a visit to the set of Star Trek, Gerrold was told by Abrams that the tribble had been deliberately "snuck in" to the scene. It appears in the scene where Kirk (Chris Pine) and Spock Prime (Leonard Nimoy) meet Scott (Simon Pegg) on the Vulcan moon. "The Trouble with Tribbles" was also re-imagined in that timeline's comic book series by IDW Publishing and entitled "The Truth About Tribbles".

In 2003, tribbles appeared in the Star Trek: Enterprise episode "The Breach". In that episode, Doctor Phlox (John Billingsley) uses them as food for his medicinal pets in sickbay.

Gerrold has been in discussions with the fan-created series Star Trek: New Voyages to bring back the tribbles for a further Original Series era episode. Both his Original Series pitch "The Protracted Man" and his Star Trek: The Next Generation script Blood and Fire have been turned into episodes of New Voyages.

Tribbles have been parodied in a variety of other television shows and types of media. An episode of Partridge Family 2200 A.D., "The Roobits" features fuzzy alien creatures that multiply quickly. This was also done in The Smurfs Season 1 episode "Fuzzle Trouble." Futurama featured a parody in the second season entitled "The Problem with Popplers", which included several Star Trek jokes. These include a reference to "Roddenberries" and features Zapp Brannigan, whom the Futurama staff have said is intended to be a parody of Captain Kirk. In 2000, a Drosophila (fruit fly) gene that blocks cell division was named tribbles (Q9V3Z1) after the small, woolly, tribble-like cells with mutations in this gene. A review describing the discovery was named after this episode. Humans carry three homologs of tribbles, TRIB1, TRIB2, and TRIB3. The parasprites in the My Little Pony: Friendship Is Magic episode "Swarm of the Century" were also partially inspired by the tribbles.

In the 2003 video game Star Wars: Knights of the Old Republic, the player's ship becomes infested with a froglike species called Gizka, prompting the player to receive the quest "The Trouble with Gizka" in order to remove the pests.

A 2010 episode of the cartoon My Little Pony: Friendship Is Magic entitled "Swarm of the Century" involves small, fuzzy, rapidly-multiplying creatures called "parasprites" overrunning the town of Ponyville.

Circa early 2013, an internet meme parody started circulating, featuring a still from "The Trouble with Tribbles", with the face of Paul McCartney superimposed onto the body of Captain who is surrounded by tribbles, accompanied by the quip "Yesterday: All my tribbles seemed so far away", parodying the first line of McCartney's signature Beatles' song "Yesterday". In 2013, singer Bob Robertson expanded the meme into a full parody of the song's lyrics, stating that he first saw the original meme in a posting by George Takei.

Star Trek: Short Treks "The Trouble with Edward" 2019. An obtuse scientist solves a planet's food shortage by adding human DNA to tribbles, against his captain's orders, creating a species that is born pregnant and reproduces at an exponential rate.

=== Merchandising and adaptations ===
Gerrold published a book describing his experiences in the creation of "The Trouble with Tribbles". Entitled The Trouble with Tribbles: The Birth, Sale and Final Production of One Episode, it was published in 1973. The book was well-received by the former cast and crew of Star Trek and was used as a textbook for teaching screenwriting. The episode itself was adapted for a children's book, Too Many Tribbles!, in the Little Golden Books line with its content somewhat softened for its intended reading demographic.

A variety of tribble replicas have been made over the years, with the most recent licensed product coming from QMx, released in 2013. A plate to commemorate the episode was the first to be launched as part of an eight-plate Star Trek: The Commemorative Collection in 1986. It featured an image of Kirk with the tribbles in the grain compartment created by artist Susie Morton. The first Original Series expansion for the Star Trek Customizable Card Game was launched in 2000. It was entitled "The Trouble with Tribbles" and was based on this episode and the associated episode of Deep Space Nine. It also introduced the Tribbles game which used only tribble-related cards.

In 2010, two movie posters for "The Trouble with Tribbles" featuring Uhura and Spock being slowly covered in tribbles were created by Justin Ishmael for the art boutique attached to the Alamo Drafthouse Cinema in Austin, Texas. It was a follow-up to earlier posters created for the episode "Space Seed". Juan Ortiz later created a 1960s-retro style poster for each of the eighty episodes of Star Trek. The "Trouble with Tribbles" poster made it appear that the warp nacelles of the Enterprise were sprouting tribbles which then bred rapidly as the ship flew on, creating a cloud of them behind the ship.

== Bibliography ==
- Abbott, Stacey (2010). The Cult TV Book. London, New York: I.B. Tauris. ISBN 9781848850255.
- Block, Paula M.; Erdmann, Terry J. (2010). Star Trek: The Original Series 365. New York: Abrams. ISBN 9780810991729.
- Gerrold, David (1973). The Trouble with Tribbles: The Birth, Sale and Final Production of One Episode (2004 BenBalla ed.). Dallas, TX: BenBalla Books.
- Gross, Edward; Altman, Mark A. (1993). Captain's Logs: The Complete Trek Voyages. London: Boxtree. ISBN 978-1-85283-899-7.
- Nemecek, Larry (2003). Star Trek: The Next Generation Companion (3rd ed.). New York: Pocket Books. ISBN 0-7434-5798-6.
- Palumbo, Donald (1986). Eros in the Mind's Eye. New York: Greenwood Press. ISBN 9780313241024.
