= James Schmerer =

American television producer (1938–2019)

- Born: James Allen Schmerer; June 14, 1938; Flushing, New York, United States
- Died: October 4, 2019 (aged 81); Eugene, Oregon, United States
- Occupation(s): Television producer and writer
- Years active: 1961–1995

James Allen Schmerer (June 14, 1938 – October 4, 2019) was an American television producer, screenwriter and author, best known for his work on popular action, western and crime drama television programs of the seventies and eighties.

== Career ==
After graduating from New York University with a bachelor's degree in motion picture production in 1960, Schmerer moved to Hollywood in 1961 and began his career as an assistant editor on the Mike Wallace-narrated series Biography, before becoming a production coordinator on another documentary series, also produced by David L. Wolper, Hollywood and the Stars. He joined the Writers Guild of America West, in 1965. In 1966, alongside producer Irving Allen, he made his jump into fiction, serving as associate producer on The Silencers, the first film in Dean Martin's Matt Helm franchise. While he didn't work on the three following films, he would work with the character on the small screen, writing three episodes of the ABC television series.

Three years later, now working as head of Creative Development at Xanadu Productions, Schmerer reputedly became the youngest producer of a prime time US television series, at the time, when he was hired by David Dortort to replace William Claxton as producer on the final two seasons of NBC's The High Chaparral at the age of 31. A decision Kent McCray felt was "a big mistake," as a relative newcomer, Schmerer frequently found himself at odds with the studio, later admitting that he was "constantly going up against the networks and the studios when they wanted me to do something I knew wasn't right." One such incident surrounded his insistence on killing Native people on the series, despite NBC demanding otherwise due to protests from Native groups, as he believed that since the show took place in 1880s Arizona, "there were hostile Indians out there." Tensions during Schmerer's run on the series were also high between him and the cast, particularly after he fired one of the series' main characters, Mark Slade (Billy Blue), without warning, after he had requested to be used less at the beginning of season four in order to complete production on a feature film.

Throughout the seventies Schmerer wrote episodes for a variety of television genres, including his debut into animation, with the Star Trek: The Animated Series episode "The Survivor". The episode is the only canon episode to mention Dr. McCoy's daughter, Joanna, a character originating in the writer's guide of the original series, who was famously written out of the third season episode "The Way to Eden". Additionally, this episode marked the first animated appearances of M'Ress, Gabler and the Romulans. The episode was later novelized by Alan Dean Foster in Star Trek Log 2.

In 1985, he began his work on MacGyver, where he would stay on as a story consultant and writer through most of the first season. Amongst his contributions to the series included the introduction of Dana Elcar's character Peter Thornton (episode: "Nightmares") and Teri Hatcher's Penny Parker (episode: "Every Time She Smiles").

Following his work in television, Schmerer began teaching in the professional program of screenwriting at UCLA's School of Theater, Film, and Television. He would also oversee courses at The Meisner-Carville School of Acting and provide seminars around the country. His pupils included In a later attempt to "try another discipline" and push his skills, he wrote the detective mystery novel Twisted Shadows, published May 9, 2000. Unfortunately, despite having two sequels in mind, he ultimately did not write any further installments in the series.

== Personal life and death ==
In October 2019, at the age of 81, Schmerer died in his home, following a stroke.

== Partial filmography ==
=== As writer ===
Year(s)	Title	Episodes(s)	Notes
1964	World Without Sun	N/A	Oscar-winning documentary as Jim Schmerer
1970-71	The High Chaparral	"A Matter of Vengeance" "The New Lion of Sonora"	
1971	Medical Center	"The Imposter"	story by
1971	Mannix	"A Choice of Evils"	teleplay by
1972	Mod Squad	"I Am My Brother's Keeper"	
1973	Chase	"The Winning Ticket"	
1973	Star Trek: The Animated Series	"The Survivor"	
1974	The Streets of San Francisco	"A String of Puppets"	story by
1974	The Rookies	"Key Witness"	
1975	The Secrets of Isis	"Spots of the Leopard"	
1975-76	Matt Helm	"Squeeze Play" "Murder on the Run" "Die Once, Die Twice"	teleplay by ("Squeeze Play")
1975/77	Starsky & Hutch	"The Bait" "The Crying Child"	story/teleplay by ("The Bait")
1976	The Six Million Dollar Man	"Hocus-Pocus"	story by
1977	Code R	"Mutiny"	
1977	Tales of the Unexpected	"No Way Out"	story by
1977	Logan's Run	"The Collectors"	
1978	Fantasy Island	"Butch and Sundance" "The Toughest Man Alive"	
1978-81	CHiPs	"Trick or Trick" "High Flyer" "Bio-Rhythms" "High Octane" "Jailbirds" "Dynamite Alley" "Go-Cart Terror" "Forty Tons of Trouble" "A Simple Operation"	teleplay by ("Dynamite Alley")
1979	240-Robert	"Bathysphere" "Out of Sight"	
1979	Hawaii Five-O	"Image of Fear"	
1979	Eight Is Enough	"Mary, He's Married"	
1979-80	Vega$	"Touch of Death" "The Lido Girls" "A Deadly Victim"	as Jim Schmerer ("A Deadly Victim")
1983	The Fall Guy	"To the Finish"	story by
1985	T.J. Hooker	"Death Is a Four Letter Word"	
1985-86	MacGyver	"The Heist" "Hellfire" "Target MacGyver" "Nightmares" "Every Time She Smiles" "The Assassin"	story by ("The Heist") teleplay by ("The Heist", "Hellfire", "Target MacGyver")
1987	The New Mike Hammer	"Deadly Collection"	story by

=== As producer ===
Year(s)	Title	Notes
1964	Hollywood and the Stars	2 episodes associate producer
1966	The Silencers	associate producer
1968	Daniel Boone	3 episodes associate producer
1969-71	The High Chaparral	43 episodes
1972-73	The Delphi Bureau	5 episodes
1973-74	Chase	21 episodes
1975	Matt Helm	12 episodes

== Bibliography ==
- Twisted Shadows (iUniverse, Incorporated, 2000) ISBN 978-0595095667
