= Tribble =

Fictional alien species in Star Trek

- Star Trek race
- Captain Kirk in a pile of tribbles
- Created by: David Gerrold

In-universe information
- Other names: Polygeminus grex, Tribleustes ventricosus
- Home world: Iota Geminorum IV
- Affiliation: None

Tribbles are a fictional alien species in the Star Trek universe. They were conceived by screenwriter David Gerrold and first appeared in 1967, in the fifteenth episode of the second season of Star Trek: The Original Series, titled "The Trouble with Tribbles". They are depicted as a small, furry, gentle, cute and slow-moving, but rapidly reproducing, lovable species. Though they appear infrequently on screen, they have become a popular feature of the Star Trek universe, featuring in their own eponymous official card game, and even lending their name to a conserved family of proteins that was first identified in the fruit fly as a regulator of cell division.

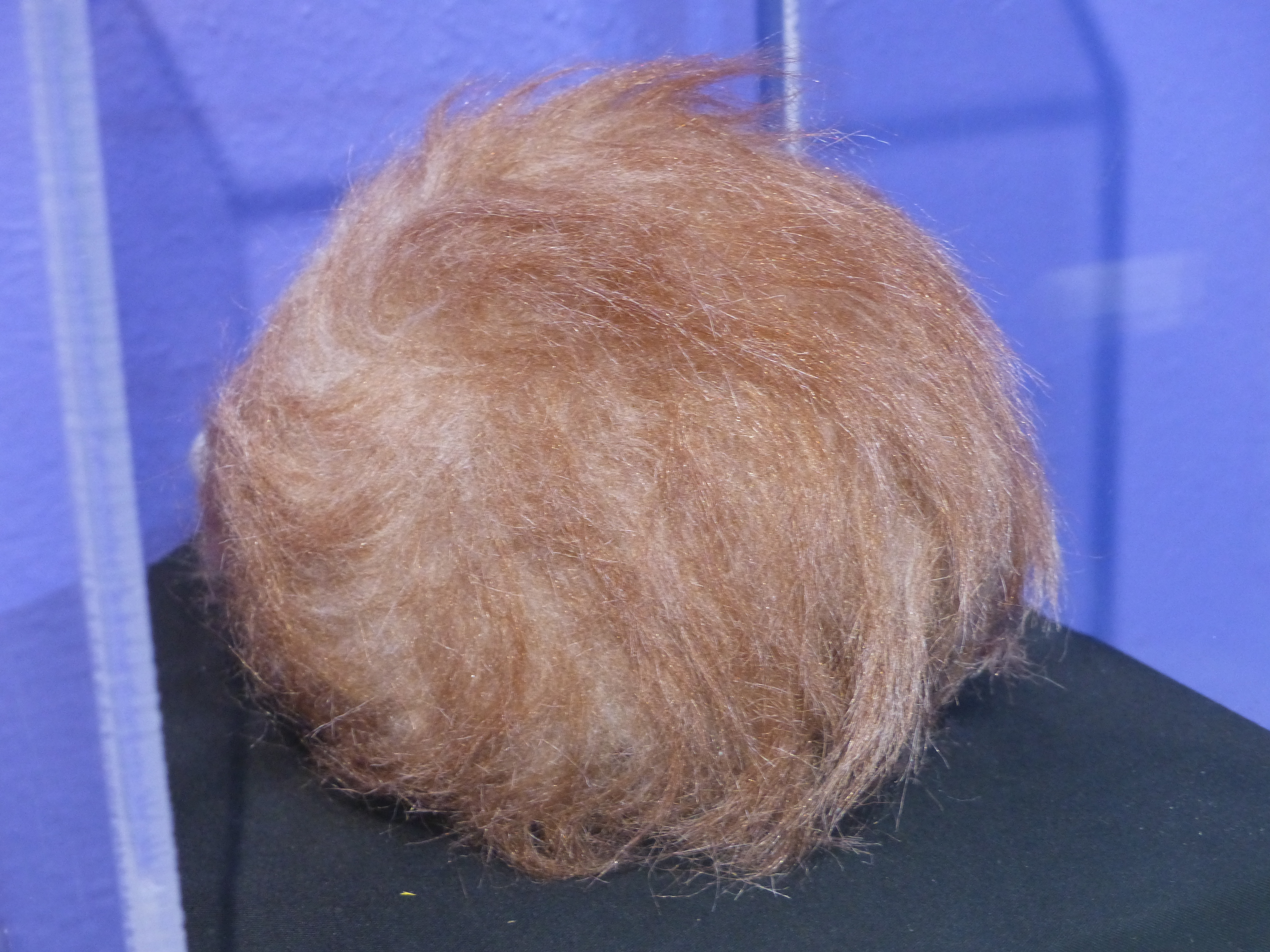
A tribble (NM Museum of Space History)

== Representation ==
Tribbles were first shown in an episode of the second season of the original series, "The Trouble with Tribbles" (1967). They have appeared in several subsequent series, in brief appearances in four Star Trek films, and in video games such as Star Trek: Armada II.

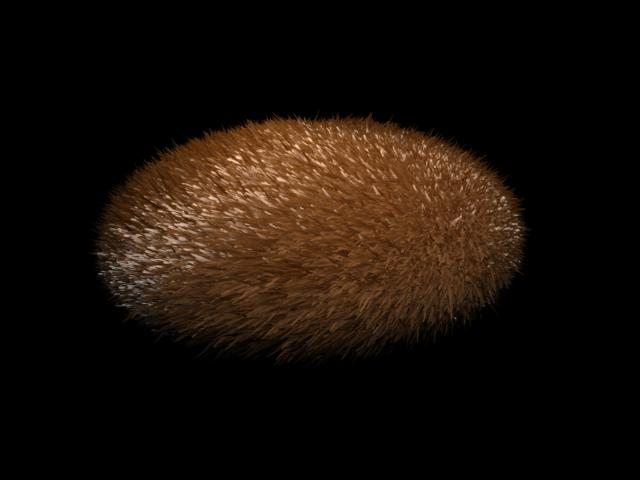
A fan-made tribble

According to Star Trek canon, tribbles are native to the 4th planet orbiting the star Iota Geminorum. While they appear as small bundles of fur with no other visible features, they do produce cooing and squeaking noises. Their coloring ranges from white and grey to black, as well as speckled brown, yellow, and orange. According to Dr. Leonard McCoy's dialogue, their only two purposes in life appear to be to eat and to reproduce, and they perform both of these functions exceptionally well. McCoy concludes that tribbles use over 50% of their metabolism for reproduction and that they are born pregnant. They are also identified as being "bisexual".

Due to their tendency to overpopulate, Starfleet considers tribbles to be dangerous organisms and forbids their transportation. A creature genetically engineered to hunt tribbles (a glommer) was introduced in the animated episode "More Tribbles, More Troubles" (1973). The Klingons, in whose presence tribbles produce a convulsive, shrieking reaction, consider them "mortal enemies", as stated in the Star Trek: Deep Space Nine episode "Trials and Tribble-ations" (1996).

A tribble appears in the Star Trek: Enterprise episode "The Breach", acquired by Doctor Phlox as live food for one of his reptilian pets. Phlox notes that tribbles are outlawed on most worlds as they breed "quite prodigiously", and that only the abundance of reptiles on their homeworld keeps their population in check.

The Star Trek: Short Treks episode "The Trouble with Edward", in contradiction with their earlier appearance in "The Breach", states that tribbles were not originally "born pregnant", and in fact their reproductive rate was exceedingly slow. A Starfleet scientist, Edward Larkin, is seen genetically engineering them into their rapidly reproducing form, in an attempt to solve a planetary food shortage. The experiment goes disastrously wrong, resulting in Larkin's death, the destruction of his ship (overrun by tribbles), and the subsequent evacuation of the planet they were trying to save. Also, some tribbles manage to reach Klingon space, also with disastrous results.

The Star Trek: Prodigy episode "A Tribble Called Quest" depicts a planet overrun with genetically modified giant tribbles: the Klingon scientist Doctor K'ruvang had attempted to create a retrovirus which could exterminate the tribble species, but his experiments accidentally resulted in the tribbles increasing in size, developing teeth and becoming aggressive. Rok'Tahk and K'ruvang are ultimately able to engineer a new retrovirus which restores the tribbles to their original form and also reduces their breeding rate. Through contaminating a tribble genetic sample with her own DNA, Rok'Tahk also accidentally creates a tribble-Brikar hybrid creature: it is named Bribble and becomes the Protostar crew's pet.

== Origin ==
David Gerrold has written that his original idea for tribbles was based on the well-known problems associated with the overpopulation of rabbits in Australia. He wanted a creature prop that would be cheap to produce and took inspiration from a ball of pink fuzz attached to a key ring. The name for tribbles was originally "fuzzies", but to avoid confusion with the 1962 H. Beam Piper novel Little Fuzzy, Gerrold brainstormed some nonsense words, arriving at "tribble".

Shortly before the episode was produced Kellam de Forest Research pointed out the similarities between Gerrold's creatures and the Martian flat cats from Robert A. Heinlein's novel The Rolling Stones (1952), and recommended purchasing the rights to the novel. Instead, Star Trek producer Gene L. Coon contacted Heinlein by telephone and asked that he waive the similarity. Heinlein did, but later regretted the decision when the Star Trek franchise continued to use tribbles in their productions.

Gerrold discusses the matter of potential inadvertent plagiarism in his book, but he does not admit to it. He claims that instead of money or credit, Heinlein asked only for a signed copy of the script, and that afterwards Heinlein wrote to him dismissing the similarity, "we both owe something to Ellis Parker Butler ... and possibly to Noah". However, Gerrold's account does not agree entirely with Heinlein's own recollection of the matter as related in private correspondence cited in his authorized autobiography. (Note: "If that matter had simply been dropped after that one episode was filmed, I would have chalked it up wryly to experience. But the "nice kid" did not drop it; "tribbles" (i.e. my "flat cats") have been exploited endlessly ... Well that's one that did "larn me". Today if J. Christ phoned me on some matter of business, I would simply tell him: "See my agent." — R.A. Heinlein)

== Reception ==
In 2007, WIRED magazine noted the tribbles as one of the top ten classic, cheesy creatures of Star Trek.

In 2017, Den of Geek ranked tribbles the 12th best aliens of the Star Trek franchise.
