= Hal Sutherland =

American animator (1929–2014)

- Born: Harold H. Sutherland; July 1, 1929; Cambridge, Massachusetts, U.S.
- Died: January 16, 2014 (aged 84); Bothell, Washington, United States
- Occupation(s): Animation director, artist
- Years active: 1954–1980s

Harold H. "Hal" Sutherland (July 1, 1929 – January 16, 2014) was an American animator and painter who began his career as a Disney animator in 1954 working on Sleeping Beauty, Lady and the Tramp, Peter Pan and the last theatrical short that featured Donald Duck. He gained recognition in the late 1960s as a director of animated productions at Filmation.

== Early life ==
He was born in Cambridge, Massachusetts, in 1929.

== Career ==
One of the company's three co-founders, Sutherland had a hand in a large number of Filmation's limited animation productions which were broadcast as Saturday morning cartoons. Sutherland's directorial assignments included the first sixteen episodes of Star Trek: The Animated Series in 1973 and The New Adventures of Flash Gordon in 1979. He also directed some of Filmation's memorable superhero cartoons, including The Adventures of Batman, The Batman/Superman Hour, Aquaman, and The Superman/Aquaman Hour of Adventure all in the late 1960s.

Sutherland went into semi-retirement in 1974, moving to Washington State to focus on fine-art painting. One of Sutherland's later assignments with Filmation was as Production Director for the television series He-Man and the Masters of the Universe, which began airing in 1983. He also directed the rather dark Pinocchio and the Emperor of the Night. Hal Sutherland's last project with Filmation was the Snow White sequel Happily Ever After which was finished in 1988 and released in 1993.

== Death ==
Sutherland died on January 16, 2014, of complications related to a gall bladder issue.
