= There Will Be Time =

1972 science fiction novel by Poul Anderson

- First edition (h/b)
- Author: Poul Anderson
- Cover artist: David Wilcox
- Language: English
- Genre: Science fiction
- Publisher: Doubleday (hard cover); New American Library (paperback)
- Publication date: 1972
- Publication place: United States
- Media type: Print (hardback & paperback)
- Pages: 181

There Will Be Time is a science fiction novel by American writer Poul Anderson. It was published in 1972 in a hardback edition by Doubleday and in 1973 in a paperback edition by New American Library.

The story is about a young man who has a genetic mutation that allows him to move through time. It was nominated for the Hugo Award for Best Novel in 1973.

== Plot ==
Jack Havig was born in the American Midwest in 1933 with a genetic mutation that allows him to travel through time. He learns that an apocalypse will occur sometime in the 21st century due to overpollution and nuclear warfare.

Farther still in the future, a New Zealand/Micronesian culture known as "the Maurai Federation" will eventually dominate the world and impose their vision of a less industrialized, more ecologically balanced world. Jack reasons that there must be others born with the same innate ability to travel through time. In his initial search for them, he visits Jerusalem at the time of the Crucifixion.

Jack is discovered by other time travelers who are agents of a time-traveling organization called the "Eyrie," that is based in the far future and is led by a racist man born in 19th century United States. Initially Jack joins the group, but eventually rebels against them when he discovers and experiences first hand the extent of the Eyrie's rampant brutality and inhumanity as they attempt to achieve their goal of stopping the Maurai ascendancy. To defeat the Eyrie, Jack returns to the 20th century and devises a plan of his own to recruit time travelers and create a "tribe" that will return to the future to destroy the Eyrie.

Much of the story takes place in various times of the past, present, and future, including an extended interlude where Jack is sent on a mission by the Eyrie to medieval Constantinople; where he saves the life of a Greek girl during the carnage of the Fourth Crusade and eventually marries her.

The future depicted in the book is the same as in Anderson's Maurai cycle.

== See also ==
- "By His Bootstraps" (1941) and "—All You Zombies—" (1959), both short stories by Robert A. Heinlein with contorted and finally close-looped timelines.
- The Man Who Folded Himself, a 1973 novel by David Gerrold, with looping time travel, also nominated for awards.
- The Time Traveler's Wife, a 2003 novel and 2009 movie that employ similar concepts.
- About Time, a 2013 film about a man that learns from his father that the men of his family have the ability to travel back in time to moments they have lived before.
