= The War Against the Chtorr =

Series of science fiction novels by David Gerrold

- Cover of the first book in the series, A Matter For Men, second edition.
- Author: David Gerrold
- Language: English
- Genre: Science fiction, book series
- Publisher: Timescape Books, et al.
- Publication date: 1983
- Publication place: United States

The War Against the Chtorr is a series of science fiction novels by American writer David Gerrold. The Chtorr series was originally planned as a trilogy, but as the story became more intricate, Gerrold realized that three books would not be enough for him to tell the entire story. For a time, he was uncertain how many books there would be in the end but plans on seven. As of 2022, four books have been completed. As of 2017, a fifth and sixth were in the works, 24 years after the publication of the fourth book.

== Books in the series ==
=== A Matter for Men (1983) ===
After mysterious and deadly viruses wipe out much of the world's population, an entire ecosystem of strange and violent alien creatures, dubbed the Chtorr, start to appear. Narrator and protagonist Jim McCarthy and his friend/colleague/occasional sex partner Ted Jackson are a young half-trained researchers attached to a squad of soldiers tasked with clearing the Colorado wilderness of nests of large and predatory "worms," one of the relatively better-known species of Chtorrans. Exploring a nest, Jim brings back both eggs and "millipedes" for further analysis. After a further unsettling encounter with a family of nesting worms, he and Ted and their samples are sent to Denver, now the US capitol, where Jim learns that political squabbling is getting in the way of making any real progress on countering the invasion. He ends up being recruited by a mysterious covert group led by "Uncle Ira" who dedicate themselves to clearing out both the Chtorr and human political opposition to this goal at any cost. In a presentation displaying a live Chtorran worm to a group of international dignitaries, the worm breaks loose and kills several people before it's stopped by McCarthy. Recovering in the hospital, he realizes that the massacre, and his death, were planned by Uncle Ira as a way of getting the international community to wake up to the Chtorran problem. Meanwhile, Ted decides to join the Telepathy Corps and disappears off into a larger hive mind. Now a real member of the Uncle Ira group, Jim returns to both wiping out and studying the expanding nests.

=== A Day for Damnation (1985) ===
On a mission over Chtorran territory in northern California, McCarthy and his sometimes-lover Colonel Elizabeth 'Lizard' Tirelli crash Liz's army helicopter in a blizzard of strange pink fuzz. Awaiting rescue, the duo take the opportunity to observe previously unknown aspects of the Chtorran life cycles and ecology. Particularly interesting are the bunnymen, alien lifeforms who display clear signs of intelligence and resemble humanoid rabbits; they interact with the worms, though it is not clear who is the dominant partner in the relationship. Upon return to San Francisco, McCarthy spends some time studying a phenomenon that surfaced soon after the invasion; massive groups of people seem to lose all but the most basic animal intelligence and wander aimlessly in herds, unwittingly luring in others who get too close. Seeing a similarity between the herd-members and the bunnyman, McCarthy allows himself to join the herd in order to study them, and only barely manages to be rescued and restored to his former self. Using what he learned, he leads a team near a nest of worms and attempts to communicate with the bunnymen. Although the experiment seems to work initially, it is finally revealed that the bunnymen are an obedient, even worshipful, food-source for the worms.

=== A Rage for Revenge (1989) ===
The third book in the series alternates between two stories, as Jim McCarthy experiences Mode Training and flashbacks to his time in a cult. On a routine mission, McCarthy is taken prisoner and slowly brainwashed into the lifestyle of the cult of human renegades and their leader, Jason Delandro. The cult believes in serving the Chtorr and have several worms on their campgrounds, although only a few high-up members are allowed to know the worms' secrets. The cult also practices a type of hedonism, characterized by free love including pedophilia. On a looting expedition, Jim discovers a military base with a working radio. Snapping back to his senses, he calls in the renegades' location, then wanders aimlessly in the wilderness while fighting an emotional internal battle over having betrayed the renegades. Jim heads to a peninsula on the California coast where his late mother used to live, called Family, and adopts three orphans. When Family's leaders ignore his urgent requests to install anti-Chtorran defenses, a group of worms break into the grounds and slaughter many of the Family, including his adopted children. Jim realizes that the worms were led by Delandro and manages to capture and execute him and his surviving followers. Jim again wanders into the wilderness and after a hallucinatory experience brought on by the Chtorran ecology, he is picked up in a helicopter by Lizard. She leads McCarthy to testify in a meeting with the unnamed President of the United States regarding the need to drop a nuclear bomb on the heavy Chtorran infestations in the Rockies, arguing that the people who live there are no longer human. Lizard drops the bomb, and she and Jim admit they truly love each other, even as they try to keep each other sane. Moving to Hawaii, the new US Capitol, Jim undergoes Mode Training to learn to overcome and direct basic human psychology; following this, he and Lizard resume their anti-Chtorran duties.

=== A Season for Slaughter (1993) ===
Leading a routine patrol in Mexico, McCarthy is saddled with a senior officer from Quebec, who is both unqualified and unprepared. McCarthy tricks him into thinking that the two of them have walked into the sensory network of a live shambler grove (a type of mobile Chtorran "tree") and are likely to be eaten alive by the grove's residents. In reality, the grove is dormant, but the officer does not know this and agrees on publicly-broadcast record to resign his commission. This leads to a diplomatic and military upheaval, which in turn gets Jim booted as the science advisor from an upcoming expedition to Brazil, and replaced with Dwan Grodin, a woman with Down syndrome who has been intellectually enhanced with numerous brain implants. An enraged Jim immediately mounts a spontaneous expedition to examine the shambler grove, and discovers a massive womb-like structure beneath it that he theorizes is the place where all the Chtorran life forms were formed after they fell to Earth. The expedition gets left to die in another pink Chtorran blizzard by a vengeful General and his aide, but is rescued by an unknown benefactor, probably due to the important new information uncovered. After getting chewed out in person by Uncle Ira, McCarthy is still sent on the mission to the Amazon rainforest, which is home to some of the heaviest Chtorran infestations on the planet; to deal with the political problems, Jim resigns his commission and is re-hired as an "Indian Scout." The mission has commandeered a massive dirigible originally built as a pleasure craft before the invasion, and paint it to resemble a worm. Aboard the ship, McCarthy and Tirelli finally marry. Arriving at the target "mandala", the expedition beams the song of a different mandala into the witnessing mass of worms, which set off a horrific slaughter that destroys the entire colony; they also learn that captive humans in the Brazilian mandalas are being grotesquely transformed into (essentially) Chtorran cattle. Attempting to rescue some of these captives from another mandala, the crew realizes too late that Chtorran stingflys have chewed countless tiny holes into the "giant worm's" helium chambers in a futile attempt to lay eggs, causing a massive loss of lift gases. Frantically dumping cargo, the ship heads back to civilization as fast as possible but crashes while still deep in Chtorran territory. Separated from Liz, Jim hears her voice on a radio briefly. To rescue her, he uses Dwan, who McCarthy correctly surmises is an unwitting victim of the Telepathy Corps, and utilizes their communications network to mount a search for Tirelli. Liz is eventually found, and as the book ends, she and Jim are evacuated in a helicopter.

=== A Nest for Nightmares ===
In June 2015, the fifth book (called A Method for Madness at that time) was reportedly slated for release September 2015 but according to the author, at the end of August 2015 only the first draft was finished and given to beta readers.

On March 14, 2017, Gerrold announced that the fifth book would be titled A Nest for Nightmares, and A Method for Madness would be the sixth book, with both books nearing completion. As of October 2025, neither the 5th nor 6th books has been published.

=== A Method for Madness ===
On March 14, 2017, Gerrold announced A Method for Madness would be the sixth book.

== Plot ==
Set in a devastated early 21st century United States with logical expected advances in current technology such as a fledgling Moon base, this series of science-fiction novels describe the invasion of Earth by an alien ecology. The story is unusual in that the tactics used by the aliens eschew the usual direct attack in favor of xenoforming the ecosystem.

The United States has suffered serious political and social upheavals. These have come from unintended consequences of US government choices regarding geopolitical crises and interventionism. In the timeline of the books, there had been another US/Eastern Bloc proxy war—between the State of Israel and certain other Middle Eastern nations—in the recent past. This had been similar to a larger, higher-technology version of the 1967 Arab-Israeli conflict, the 1973 Arab–Israeli War, and others. The books do not explain the detailed conduct of the fictional new war, neither do they state which countries fought Israel.

In the summer of 1997, Israel had deployed a nuclear weapon — and the world's perception was that Israel had done so at the instructions of the United States. In a case rather like a reversal of the Cuban Missile Crisis, America had been placed under an explicit nuclear ultimatum from the Soviet Union. Modern printings of the books, however, state that the ultimatum came from Russia.

The unnamed President of the United States had refused to accept that a nuclear World War III was inevitable, so he had decided to travel to Moscow, where in the year 2000 “the Millennium Treaties” had been signed. The United States had been substantially hobbled by the Millennium Treaties. Years later there had been subsequent treaties after the United States entered a bitter war in Pakistan. The US failed in its objectives there, and it was given another nuclear ultimatum. The second ultimatum came from the People's Republic of China. As a result, the United States was required to greatly weaken its armed forces, to comply with new bans on certain weapon systems, to make official statements of culpability for warmongering, and to undertake new programs of civic education for the young that were supposed to establish precautions against the possibility of Americans making choices to start future wars. Also, the United States was made to pay heavy reparations to the international community. America's network of allies continues to realign and break apart. Other countries continue to become more hostile, even though it is not always in a military sense of hostility.

U.S. leaders respond by stimulating the domestic economy with large investments in new technologies. Secondly, the U.S. manages to surreptitiously re-structure the reparations required under the Millennium Treaties. The new US national security strategy is subtle, and has a focus on making other countries more reliant on the United States. This was done through applying economic diplomacy, sharp power, soft power, and other measures to increase foreign dependency on a variety of assets and systems controlled or heavily influenced by America. These include America's new generations of advanced robotic systems, American space-based solar power technologies, American food exports, American space transportation systems such as spaceplanes, and newly expanded efforts by agencies such as the Peace Corps and USAID.

In great secrecy, the American government continues work on advanced military technologies, dual-use technologies, and finding means to leverage the revolution in military affairs to gain advantage in this radically new geopolitical situation. The books give attention to such things as high-energy microwave weapons, cyberwarfare, military teleoperation, and intelligent agents that can be militarized. All these efforts are forbidden under the Millennium Treaties.

Soon afterwards, a lengthy onslaught of devastating plagues sweeps the world, killing 60% of humanity. As the survivors struggle to rebuild civilization, they gradually discover that hundreds of alien plant and animal species have mysteriously begun to entrench themselves. All these strange species are far more opportunistic and aggressive than the native organisms occupying the same ecological niches. As a result, Earth's entire ecology is being rapidly supplanted (or "chtorraformed"). The invaders are called Chtorrans after the sound made by the most deadly predator encountered so far.

There are no signs of sentient aliens, but humans presume the invasion to be deliberate, either "seeded" from space or brought by undetected spacecraft. Many of the Chtorran organisms (see below) exhibit behaviors that are quasi-sentient (building structures, creating and using tools, farming/herding, setting traps, singing), yet the central question of whether they are doing so out of sentience or collective and programmed behavior is as yet unanswered. With each new layer of organisms, a bit more hierarchy to the Chtorran "social" structure is revealed, allowing the possibility that all these organisms will transform the Earth in support of some worse, higher form of Chtorran life. The presumed goal of these off-stage aliens appears to be the complete replacement of Earth's ecology—such that most macroscopic native organisms would be wiped out, a tiny percentage of native organisms would be altered or reconditioned to be placed under husbandry, and the aliens would presumably be able claim Earth without a single shot. Another possibility is that collectively the Chtorr are the aliens. The ecological invasion has gained enormous footholds, and humanity has yet to figure out who the true enemy is; let alone how to fight back successfully).

The books largely follow the adventures of Jim McCarthy, a scientist and soldier in the U.S. Army, who attempts to understand the Chtorran ecology even as he engages in combat to destroy it. His early efforts primarily focus on the "Worms", a particularly large and dangerous apex predator Chtorran species whose prey consists largely of human beings. McCarthy and other scientists investigate the rapidly expanding webs of Chtorran ecosystems and attempt to unravel the relationships between the species.

In addition to descriptions of alien ecology, the Chtorr series includes lengthy expositions on various aspects of human psychology, particularly under wartime and survival conditions.

== Characters ==
- Jim McCarthy: The series' protagonist. The books are written from his point of view. Jim is a military scientist who was drafted into the secret "Uncle Ira" group as a way of fighting the Chtorran infection without political oversight. He is bisexual, and retains a loving relationship with Lizard Tirelli. Jim is often characterized as being very brash, abrasive and impulsive. He cannot stand when bigger issues get swallowed up in politics, and is often bailed out by Lizard or the Uncle Ira group after taking certain actions, such as goading a Québécois major to resign his commission out of cowardice.
- Archibald "Duke" Anderson: Jim's commanding officer.
- Elizabeth "Lizard" Tirelli: An officer in the US Army. She starts off as a captain who pilots helicopters, but by the fourth book she has been promoted to general and is one of the leaders of the US military in its war against the Chtorr. She is in a complicated relationship with McCarthy.
- Ted: Jim's military partner and sometimes lover. Ted joins the Telepathy Corps early on in the series and has a chip implanted in his brain which allows other Telepathy Corps members to access his body. He talks about how he no longer feels a connection with his body; as part of the Corps mass mind, he can occupy and use any other Corps body.
- General "Uncle Ira" Wallachstein: The leader of a top-secret military group with authorization only from the President. Officially, neither Wallachstein nor his organization even exists. The purpose of the "Uncle Ira" group is to do whatever it takes to fight the Chtorran invasion—whether inside or outside the United States—and they ignore the politics that inevitably get in the way.
- Daniel Foreman: An enigmatic and harsh man who leads the Mode Training courses. He teaches people how to reach their potential required to fight the Chtorr by changing in and out of "modes" and how to accept the limitations and concepts of one's own psychology. He writes articles under the name "Solomon Short" and is quoted as such at the heading of the chapters in books 3 and 4.
- General Wainwright: The highest-ranking member of the military shown in the books. The General is more of a politician than a fighter, and is usually characterized as putting his own troops at risk rather than risking a political bungle. He has told McCarthy numerous times that he has a personal hatred for him, something that only seems to amuse McCarthy. Wainwright has an assistant, Dannenfelser, who has an open personal dislike for McCarthy and often seeks to make him miserable.
- Jason Delandro: Jason is the spiritual leader of a group of renegades living nomadically in unpopulated territory in the United States. He is very convincing and has an extremely loyal, almost religious, following. He believes in living as hosts and treating the Chtorrans as guests, with the understanding that the Chtorrans could take whatever they need, including innocent human life. Three of the members of his group are actually worms; one, Orrie, raised from birth, and the other two trained by Orrie to understand humans. The human-Chtorran relationship amongst the renegades is complex, but ultimately results in a loss of humanity for those involved (characterized by people giving their newborn babies as food to the worms) with complete acceptance of and subservience to the Chtorrans.

== Groups, technology and other concepts ==
- Telepathy Corps: The Teep Corps (as they are often referred to) is a group of people with microchips implanted in their brains to allow each member full access to every other member's memories, senses and thoughts. Although originally initiated as a government program, many characters mention a fear that the Teep Corps has become a massmind, and is free from any oversight. Members are stripped of their personal identity and lose their personal connection to their own bodies. Often, a new initiate will become "lost" by losing sentience and simply becoming a body and collection of memories for the Corps. Although it has been shown that members can show individuality, they have a different concept of what it means to be an individual. Since any member can potentially fully control any body of any other member, bodies are conceptually separate from individual minds. Many Corps members are actually not aware that they are members, as they have had the microchip implanted in them without their knowledge. This was originally done to allow the Corps to spy on renegade groups within Chtorran mandalas, but it is hinted that the process has become out of control and the Corps may have used it as a way of controlling political entities.
- Zombie Herds: In some metropolitan areas, humans have been observed losing their sentience and shambling around in mindless herds. It is uncertain what is the cause of it. Zombies have been observed having almost no desires or inhibitions, acting like simple animals. Some government agencies have taken it upon themselves to feed the herds, as they seem not to possess the ability to forage for food. People who follow or spend enough time with a herd will eventually find themselves drawn in. Sometimes a herd will start up a strange sort of singing that can attract more humans to join them. Occasionally, like in moments of extreme pain or stress, a zombie will snap back to being a human, although they will retain few to no memories of time spent in the herd. By the fourth novel, zombie herds are becoming heavily infected with neural symbionts, giving them the appearance of having developed fine coats of pink fur – apparently the first stage in their mutation into bunnydogs and libbits.

== Chtorran ecology ==
Chtorran ecology was designed in large part by British reproductive biologist Jack Cohen. It is quite complete and consistent, making it hard science fiction.

If there are two things that all Chtorran life forms have in common, it is that they are hungry, and that they change. Virtually all Chtorran life forms engage in some form of symbiosis, which can be recursive. Indeed, by later books scientists began to suspect that the "Chtorran biosphere" isn't so much a collection of different species as it is one vast hive-like superorganism, with each species not only fulfilling a niche but laying the groundwork for other more complex forms. Several species of prey animals are in fact suspected to be the juvenile versions of larger predator animals — the few who survive to adulthood metamorphose and feed on their younger cousins.

What little can be guessed about the Chtorran homeworld is that it must have slightly higher gravity than Earth, and its atmosphere somewhat lower oxygen content—explaining the strength of Chtorran musculature and how efficiently they process oxygen on Earth. Their planet is also suspected to be located near an older red giant star, resulting in most Chtorran creatures possessing a warm color scheme of pink to red (though this varies). Chtorran organisms use DNA as genetic material: theoretical xenobiologists explain that DNA was already predicted to be the universal basis for alien biospheres, due to its inherent chemical stability. Chtorran DNA even auto-sorts into chromosomes on a basic level, however, its inter-relations are vastly more complex than comparable Terran genetics. Chtorran molecular biology is thus compatible with Earth's, with right-handed DNA and left-handed proteins - if it wasn't, the infestation would have starved to death as soon as it began, unable to digest Terran organisms.

Chtorran life forms (at least those encountered so far) seem to thrive best in semi-tropical climate zones, though they are also quite successful in tropical and temperate zones. It is speculated that they may prefer warmer climates, and have only adapted so well to the temperate zones because there are generally more humans to eat there. Whatever the case, six years into the invasion there is not a single region of the planet that does not have at least some small trace of Chtorran life forms in it, even micro-organisms.

Generally, Chtorran life has been slower to spread to desert or polar regions — again, possibly because there is simply less bio-mass to consume in them. Due to its desert climate, Australia is cited as the only inhabited continent in which the infestation has been relatively light (and it is also light in frozen Antarctica). Europe has been only moderately infested, for reasons not entirely clear (possibly because the initial plagues devastated its highly concentrated population centers so badly that Chtorrans there did not have a surplus of humans to eat). Most world militaries were wiped out in the plagues, because governments deployed their soldiers as riot police, allowing them to become infected as well. The only exception was the United States: due to losing a war in the Middle East, international pressure forced it to disarm most of its standing army, the result being that they survived the plagues and were able to be re-mobilize soon afterwards. Thus North America is also one of the few regions that has been able to resist Chtorran encroachment. Even then, much of the West Coast has been lost, due to Chtorrans breeding unnoticed in the wilderness of the Rocky Mountains until their numbers were overwhelming. The worst infected zones in the United States are in the Rocky Mountains, and in the semi-tropics of the southeastern states (Mississippi through Florida): limited nuclear strikes in these states only temporarily culled the infestation, which grew back to prior levels within a matter of months.

Otherwise, vast swaths of South America, Africa, and Asia have been totally overrun. Asia in particular was hard hit by the plagues - with the exception of Japan, which due to its isolated island geography was able to survive relatively intact. Some of the absolute worst and largest Chtorran infestations are in the western United States, India, and the Amazon basin of Brazil — areas which increasingly resemble an alien planet.

=== Chtorran fauna ===
- Chtorran Gastropedes (commonly known as "Worms"): The main antagonists of the series. Range in size from as small as a dog to as large as a bus, or even larger. Normally bright red, but have been seen in other colors ranging from white to green. They have two double-jointed "arms" which end in very dextrous three-digit "hands", with incredibly sharp claws. Their bodies are covered with symbiotic "fur", each strand of which is a distinct lifeform and acts as a sensory input. Thus they resemble large, furry pink caterpillars—with a pair of large goggle-like eyes atop their heads, clawed arms, and rasping tooth-filled mouths. Worms are capable of remarkable acts of problem solving and interaction and some have been observed to understand a rudimentary form of English, but both their intelligence and their communication abilities have yet to be fully understood. As long as they eat meat, they can continue to grow; their growth slows when their diet is only on vegetation, but their appetite is much larger. It is understood that a worm "family" consists of four, though their roles are unclear. When a group of worms form a family, they build a large, domed structure referred to as a hut. The worms live in a series of tunnels within and beneath the huts. When many huts are built close together, they start to merge into larger huts, and so on. This process repeats recursively, forming Chtorran cities which the military calls mandalas due to their spiraling shapes. When a worm reaches a mass that makes it unable to move, it will crawl into a dead end corner of the nest and eventually die—it is suspected though not confirmed that these older individuals incubate new gastropede eggs which burst out of them in death. While the worms do form social units of four, scientists remain baffled at how exactly they reproduce. Analysis of their complex genetic material seems to indicate that they don't have different sex chromosomes, so every worm should be one biological gender — but whether this means they reproduce with each other (like Terran slugs) or reproduce through fission of some kind, remains unknown. By the second novel, scientists observe that the gastropedes do not seem to fit within the Chtorran ecology's food chain — at least what parts of it are currently present on Earth. While they do eat Chtorran millipedes and bunnymen, the ratio of protein they provide versus the vast amounts the worms need to consume simply doesn't match up. Thus the gastropedes can only meet their dietary needs by eating native Terran life forms as well, i.e. humans. This leads some scientists to suspect that the gastropedes are essentially "sheep dogs" for whatever intelligence is truly directing the invasion, a servant race intentionally set loose on Earth for the express purpose of wiping out the indigenous large life forms, specifically humans.
- Neural Symbionts: The most ubiquitous creature in the ecology. The neural symbiont is a small, hair-like creature that attaches itself to the nervous system of a larger creature. The host will then achieve heightened senses, reflexes and some form of communication with other hosts. Many Chtorrans such as the gastropedes and bunnydogs are completely covered in symbionts—in what appears to be a very dense "fur" of light pink to red hairs. It is theorized that the symbionts actually do most of the thinking and communication for their host creatures, thus accounting for the small brain yet high functionality in many Chtorrans. Humans that bond with symbionts soon lose the ability, or will, to communicate with uninfected humans, but can live in harmony inside a Chtorran mandala. Outside of a mandala, symbiosis is usually fatal to Earth creatures. Some scientists suspect that the neural symbionts, acting as a hive mind, essentially are the main leaders of the invasion—if there can even be said to be one leader. An alternative view is that the entire Chtorran biosphere is a superorganism which can be thought of as a large body, in which case the neural symbionts are the brains. Although most often observed on the gastropedes and bunnydogs, neural symbionts are ubiquitous throughout the Chtorran ecology, found not only on Chtorran animals such as gorps but also plants such as shambler trees and manna plants.
- Millipedes: These bear no relation to terrestrial millipedes. Though similar in appearance, they tend to have hard black shells and bellies of varied colors. Their bite is very powerful, and they are capable of devouring and digesting wood, leather, rubber, plastic—anything even remotely organic save their own (or worm) waste. Their bite is also toxic, introducing various diseases and micro-organisms into the bloodstream. The worms keep them in "corrals" near their huts like chicken farms—and eat them like popcorn.
- Jellypigs: Small, blob-like creatures that live off of nutrients found in dirt. Their part of the ecology seems to be to dig out the tunnels and underground areas necessary for many creatures to survive. They are only found in "clumps" of several dozen or more, and often several hundred. Jellypigs excavate tunnels by literally eating as much dirt as they can: when they eat so much they slow down, millipedes or gastropedes eat them—given that most of their mass by this point is actually soil, these other creatures then remove it from the nest when they defecate outside. Reproduction happens when jellypigs rub against one another in a clump, cross fertilizing small eggs contained just beneath the skin. When a jellypig stops moving for a certain amount of time, the babies eat their way out of the mother. Jellypigs seem to be genetically related to gastropedes and may be a simplified version of them or an evolutionary cousin; other reports indicate that millipedes may metamorphosize into them — or perhaps they are some sort of intermediate stage between millipede and gastropede.
- Nest-boas: Snake-like creatures which inhabit gastropede mandalas. They are known to eat congregations of jellypigs, but otherwise, their exact role in the Chtorran ecology is not yet fully understood.
- Snufflers: Relatively harmless to humans, snufflers are bipedal creatures ranging in size from chickens to ostriches. They somewhat resemble a headless chicken or a slug/snake mounted onto two legs. Their "neck" tapers off without a head into a circular, snout-like mouth, hence the name "snufflers". The end of their neck is ringed with eyestalks, but they do not possess a "head" as such. In more advanced gastropede mandalas, bunnymen actually ride snufflers as a basic form of transport. As observed in these more socially complex large settlements, snufflers are compared to house servants, and bunnydogs to pizza delivery men. Bunnydogs perform basic maintenance tasks on the tribal level, while on a family unit level, snufflers clean up dwellings by eating up any waste.
- Enterprise Fish: These are the largest Chtorran creatures known. These creatures go through the oceans, eating anything in their path. The upper size limit is unknown, but the largest one killed massed over one million tons, and far larger ones have been reported. An individual blamed for the near-sinking of the USS Nimitz was said to be at least twice the length of the aircraft carrier, making the fish over 2,000 feet long. At least 30 of them exist in the world's oceans as of the fifth novel, tracked by satellite, but due to their massive size and near-invulnerability they have reduced humanity's dominance of the oceans. Physically, are nearly impossible to kill: their outer layers have several dozen yards of empty flesh and cartilage, with internal organs so large and widely dispersed that it is impossible for ordinary bombardment to do them serious harm: it can take up to half an hour of heavy bombardment by battleships for them to even notice they are being attacked. Only two have been killed, and only with low-yield nuclear bombs. Even then, several scientists suspect that the Enterprise Fish are just an overgrown, hairless, sea-going form of the gastropedes, and may just be a variant molt of them.
- Stingflies: One of the most common Chtorran creatures, stingflies resemble large mosquitoes. Although their bite is not very harmful to humans or animals, they can attack in swarms and do a large amount of damage. They lay their eggs on a Chtorran plant called a "wormberry" and hatch once in the stomach of whatever ate the berry. Gastropedes and other Chtorrans do not seem to be harmed by stingfly larvae living in their bodies, but humans can die of painful ulcers and infections if they accidentally eat stingfly eggs. Stingflies are ubiquitous around gastropede mandalas, their swarms above them so large that they noticeably dim the sunlight in the sky. Through parallel evolution, stingflies operate much like mosquitoes as a vector for Chtorran viruses and bacteria: scientists believe that they were one of the major vectors that quickly spread the devastating plagues which began the invasion.
- Gorps: These large creatures resemble sloths, but stand 10–15 feet tall, with disproportionately long arms and barrel chests. They also have a short tapir-like proboscis, and a cluster of eyes. They emit a horrible smell (capable of destroying non-Chtorran life), and are mostly carrion eaters, though they do not always wait for their meals to die before they eat them. They are so-called for the noise they make, though they are also known by the military reporting name "Ghouls" due to their frightening dietary habits. Gorps are slow enough that humans can evade them fairly well, though they are lethal to anything within arm's reach.
- Finger Babies: These small creatures are from one to two inches in length, and closely resemble humans. Their ecological niche appears to be that of an insect. The GURPS War Against the Chtorr RPG sourcebook revealed that Finger Babies are actually embryonic Gorps.
- Bunnydogs/Bunnymen: Bipedal herbivores about a meter in height possessing roughly the same intelligence as chimps. Bunnydogs are covered in the same "fur" as the worms and resemble pink or red rabbit-eared teddybears. Some Bunnydogs eventually become Bunnymen—a variant of bunnydogs that lack that fur and are about half again as tall, making them resemble bipedal rats—with a disposition to match. Not all bunnydogs mature into bunnymen, though both are capable of reproduction. All bunnydogs/bunnymen are male. Unlike practically all other Chtorran life forms, Bunnydogs are not particularly aggressive, and are playful towards humans and each other. Bunnydogs are bubbling with joyous energy and have a massive sex drive, bouncing around trying to have sex with everything around them, particularly libbits but also other animals.
- Libbits: These quadrupeds resemble pigs. Short and squat, they are covered with red fur and are very docile. They have heavyset hind legs and while they normally walk on all fours, they can rear up and use their front limbs as hands. All Libbits are female. It was later discovered that Libbits and Bunnydogs/Bunnymen are actually male and female of the same species. Their reproductive process is strange—if a single Bunnyman mates with a Libbit she will give birth to a litter of Libbits, but if multiple Bunnymen mate with a Libbit, she will produce a litter of Bunnydogs.
  - Assimilated humans: Humans infected by the neural symbionts turn into "zombie herds": aimless, docile, and capable of living within Chtorran mandalas (though the gastropedes will still randomly eat them from time to time, like a farmer eating his sheep). The fourth novel revealed that the later stages of Chtorran viral/parasitic infection actually mutate and transform humans into new bunnydogs and libbits—though the process is slow and they are still disturbingly recognizable as former humans for quite some time. Because bunnydogs and libbits only live a few years before being eaten by the gastropedes they reach sexual maturity very quickly. Human scientists were deeply disturbed to discover this by comparing aerial reconnaissance photos of Chtorran mandalas over a period of months and years: mutated but still recognizable five year old human boys transformed into adult bunnydogs, gleefully having sex with everything around them until eaten without protest by the resident gastropedes, while similarly aged girls mutated into near-sessile libbits, acting as breeding vats for a new generation of bunnymen/libbits. This is the ultimate form of co-existence that the gastropedes intend for humanity: fast-breeding domesticated cattle.
  - Bunnydogs and libbits only started appearing in the second novel, as a new layer of the Chtorran ecology—somewhat implying that there never were "original" bunnydogs and libbits, produced by the shambler tree wombs, but that every bunnydog and libbit seen in the series was actually either a mutated/Chtorraformed human child or a direct descendant of one. Characters in the second novel were also puzzled at why the Chtorrans were seemingly going out of their way to collect and corral human children instead of just eating them immediately (at least not all of them). Other scientists in the second novel point out how odd it is that the bunnydogs seem to be herbivores, yet still have forward-facing eyes like a predator animal (for stereoscopic vision), leading them to suspect that the Chtorrans mutated the bunnydogs out of some previous stock. It is also mentioned that recon missions into gastropede mandalas have found eggs for millipedes, jellypigs, snufflers, and gorps—but no mention has been made of bunnydog/libbit eggs.
- Meeps: These are red furballs, ranging in size from tennis ball to bowling ball in diameter. Like another alien fuzzball envisioned by Gerrold, they reproduce very quickly, and possess many traits which induce adoration in other species. In the wild, mother animals of many species will actually abandon their young in order to take care of meeps—a potent adaptation indeed. Some scientists speculate that the bunnydogs essentially rely on the same tactic as the meeps in a sense: they are so disarmingly cute, literally resembling living teddy bears, that humans are reluctant to attack them.
- Nightstalkers: vaguely insectoid creatures which resemble large bats with cloaks, and of roughly similar size to larger bats and birds of prey. They have a similar ecological niche to birds of prey, primarily eating insects but also smaller rodents.
- Kites: As the name implies, they resemble large living kites. The size of eagles, they fulfill a similar ecological niche as a flying apex predator, preying on Nightstalkers just as eagles prey on lesser birds.
- Vampires: A very bizarre creature, essentially resembling a living tarpaulin or translucent blanket fluttering in the wind. It eventually falls on large creatures (often cattle but also humans), and drains them of blood to feed, hence their name. These feedings aren't necessarily fatal but frequently are due to severe blood loss.

=== Chtorran plants ===
Some Chtorran life-forms are similar to plants or fungi, but many are carnivorous plants, or mobile animal-plant hybrids which defy easy categorization.

- Shambler Trees: Chtorran trees that act as hosts to countless separate species of predatory creatures identified as "tenants". The trees are mobile, able to cover up to a half mile a day and leaving a root network of "tickler nerves" in their path. The "tickler nerves" alert a tree to approaching prey, which triggers the tenants to swarm and feed. Once the tenants eat their fill, the prey's remains will fertilize the root network. Ultimately, the trees become a Clonal colony or "Shambler Grove". At an undetermined point in their growth, a shambler grove may permanently stop in one area and grow a sort of womb beneath their roots where all the different Chtorran species will emerge. McCarthy theorized that the Chtorrans came to Earth by shambler seeds, which contains the DNA of every Chtorran lifeform. They are a complex and key element of Chtorran ecology on Earth, essentially acting as factories which can produce all of the other species after making planetfall—though subsequently species like the worms are capable of reproducing on their own without the shambler groves.
- Manna plants: Small pink fungi that can rapidly blanket an area. During some seasons, the plant dries out and becomes brittle and powdery. It will dissipate when touched into powdery strands. The strands of many plants clump together into puffballs which can grow to enormous sized. Eventually, the puffballs explode into a fine powder compared to cotton candy. This creates a storm of powder that lasts about a week, during which the lower Chtorran fauna come out to feed and reproduce, which is then echoed all the way up the food chain. Most Earth animals and plants will die in a puffball storm, and humans will easily get lost and overwhelmed. They are perhaps the most subtly dangerous lifeform in the Chtorran ecosystem; the powder destroys machinery, as it is not only flammable, but (like grain dust) fine enough to act as a thermobaric weapon. The powder is every bit as hazardous to terrestrial animals as it is filled with Chtorran bacteria; exposure to it quickly results in an equivalent of Legionellosis known as "pink lung" that is 100% fatal within days of exposure without state-of-the-art treatment. As basic mushroom-like fungi in their simpler stages, scientists suspect that manna plants were among the first Chtorran life-forms to appear on Earth, acting as primary plant growth which established groundwork conditions for other Chtorran life forms birthed out of the shambler tree wombs. Retroactive analysis confirmed that there were reports of manna plants (thought to just be a new kind of fungus) years before the wave of plagues hit in the initial invasion.
- Red Kudzu: Similar to the terrestrial plant, but red in color. This plant ranges from jet black to pink, red, violet, and orange. It grows extremely quickly and can cover an entire town in weeks. Its greatest danger is in its ability to shelter Chtorran predatory life—attempts to control its spread through napalm strikes are negated in days by further growth, but massive numbers of human remains have been found before it reclaims the scorched ground. All attempts to destroy it have failed, and it appears to be resistant to all known poisons. Red kudzu exists in a symbiotic, or at least mutualistic, relationship with shamble tree groves: the red kudzu grows in shambler branches and uses it for transport across large distances, and in return, the red kudzu provides the shambler and its tenant creatures with shade from the sun and predators. This is not true symbiosis: the red kudzu can potentially envelop a shambler to the point that it is immobilized and dies (particularly younger ones), but the shambler tenants regularly eat the red kudzu. In a delicate balance, the tenants eat just enough of the red kudzu to keep it from immobilizing the shambler grove, but without outright killing off the red kudzu.
- Sea sludge: A red algae-like organism that spreads across the surface of water, much like a Terran algae bloom—but on a massive scale. Locally, the red algae is relatively harmless—though humans and animals who swallow water containing it will suffer violent nausea and diarrhea—but on a global scale it is perhaps the single most destructive Chtorran organism of all. The oily sludge it secretes kills off surrounding Terran plankton and algae, thus starving to death all Terran sea life within (from fish up to larger sharks and whales). Sea sludge spread so fast that even a few years after the plagues it had already overrun most of the world's oceans, destroying virtually the entire marine biosphere.
- Wormberries: An important part of the gastropedes' diet, which stingflies lay their larvae on. The fact that gastropedes continue to eat them despite the constant presence of stingfly larvae implies that they are a keystone element in the gastropedes' nutritional needs. Humans can safely eat wormberries—if grown in isolation so no stingfly larvae are present. They are actually a good source of Vitamin C, though they are said to have an odd taste described as a cross between "cherries and sauerkraut".
- Shrike-vines: A rubbery mass of coiled vines covered in spikes which is capable of movement on its own, somewhat like a venus flytrap, but more of an animal/plant hybrid. Shrike-vines are ambush predators that are frequently encountered as "tenants" in shambler tree groves, though they can also appear independently from them.
- Revelation flowers: Blue and red flowers that, when ingested, put a person into a state of intense euphoria. People undergoing "Revelations" view Chtorran flora and fauna as beautiful, and seek to become part of it. They are often used by the renegade humans to somehow understand Chtorrans.
- Land coral: Much like Terran coral, they are actually colonies of small animals that build reef-like structures: towering edifices which can reach 20 meters high and several miles long. Land coral is tougher than granite and halts the progress of human vehicles, from bulldozers to treaded tanks. For that matter, they are so tough that even the gastropedes cannot simply tear through them.
- Lizard-grass: Alive, lizard-grass is a relatively harmless blue-green grass which can grow eight inches high. After the plant dies, however, the dried leaves become razor-sharp and dangerous to walk through. Vast swaths of the North American Great Plains and Eurasian Steppe have been subsumed by lizard-grass as far as the eye can see.

== First and second editions ==
There are two distinctly different editions of the first two books in this series. The first edition was released in 1983 by Timescape Books. This edition was edited by the publisher and removed several items which they objected to. All of the chapter introductions (the "Solomon Short" quotations) and several pages of homosexual content were removed. The same thing was done to the 1984 release of A Day for Damnation.

In 1989, David Gerrold made a new publishing contract with Bantam Books. This time, both A Matter for Men and A Day for Damnation were released with all redacted content restored.

== Connections to other Gerrold works ==
Many characters and ideas from other works by David Gerrold have made appearances in this series. Amongst them are H.A.R.L.I.E. (from the book When HARLIE Was One), tribbles (from Star Trek, disguised as Meeps), and the Space Elevator (from the book Bouncing Off the Moon).

The reverse is also true—there are references to the series in other Gerrold novels. In Bouncing Off the Moon, there is a mention of a woman in Oregon claiming that a giant worm ate her horse, along with numerous passages about plagues spreading across the Earth, also suggesting that the two stories take place in the same story universe. References to the series also appear in the Star Wolf novels, such as Chtorrans proper and a self-help guru named Daniel Jeffrey Foreman, suggesting the two series exist in the same universe. In Gerrold's 1977 novel Moonstar Odyssey, there is a reference to "Chtorr-plants" "...named for the legendary place of child-eating demons from which they were supposed to have come" and having an alternate form of photosynthesis. Reference to the Chtorr or Chtorr-like species and situations also pop-up in Gerrold's 1993 book Under the Eye of God and its 1994 sequel A Covenant of Justice. In his Star Trek novel, The Galactic Whirlpool, Gerrold quotes the "Terran philosopher, Solomon Short" as saying, "This neurotic pursuit of sanity is driving us all crazy."

== Naming of characters ==
For Season for Slaughter, Gerrold named several characters after actual people, who donated handsomely to Gerrold's favorite charities for the privilege ("tuckerization"). Gerrold had not thought to repeat the effort, but as work on Method for Madness progressed, he received so many fan inquiries about "buying a character" that he decided to do it again. Prior to that, In A Rage For Revenge, Gerrold included several characters, particularly children who were fated to be eaten by worms, named after friends he had made when attending his first UK Star Trek conventions.
