= When HARLIE Was One =

1972 science fiction novel by David Gerrold

- First edition (UK)
- Author: David Gerrold
- Cover artist: Marty Jaos
- Language: English
- Genre: Science fiction
- Publisher: Ballantine Books (US); Nelson Doubleday (UK)
- Publication date: August 1972 (UK); October 1972 (US)
- Publication place: United States
- Media type: Print (hardback & paperback)
- Pages: 279
- Followed by: When Harlie Was One Release 2.0

When HARLIE Was One is a 1972 science fiction novel by American writer David Gerrold. It was nominated for the Nebula Award for Best Novel in 1972 and the Hugo Award for Best Novel in 1973. The novel, a "fix-up" of previously published short stories, was published as an original paperback by Ballantine Books in 1972, with an accompanying Science Fiction Book Club release. A revised version, subtitled "Release 2.0", was published in 1988 by Bantam Books.

The book is dedicated to Steven Earl Parent, one of the victims of the Tate-LaBianca murders, who was killed by members of the Manson family at 10050 Cielo Drive. “For Steven Earl Parent, with love. Sleep well, old friend. You got the job done.”

== Plot introduction ==
Central to the story is an artificial intelligence named H.A.R.L.I.E., also referred to by the proper name "HARLIE"—an acronym for Human Analog Replication, Lethetic Intelligence Engine (originally Human Analog Robot Life Input Equivalents).

HARLIE's story revolves around his relationship with David Auberson, the psychologist who is responsible for guiding HARLIE from childhood into adulthood. It is also the story of HARLIE's fight against being turned off, and the philosophical question of whether or not HARLIE is human; for that matter, what it means to be human.

When HARLIE Was One contains one of the first fictional representations of a computer virus (preceded by Gregory Benford in 1970), and one of the first uses of the term "virus" to describe a program that infects another computer.

== Reception ==
Theodore Sturgeon reported that the novel "carries a good freight of social and psychological insight".

== In other works ==
The HARLIE intelligence engine appears in a number of Gerrold's other works:

- In the Star Wolf series, HARLIE is routinely installed as the administrating AI of Terran warships.
- The Dingilliad series, Jumping Off the Planet, Bouncing Off the Moon, and Leaping to the Stars.
- A Nest for Nightmares, the fifth book of The War Against the Chtorr.
