= The Man Who Folded Himself =

1973 novel by David Gerrold

- Cover of first edition (hardcover)
- Author: David Gerrold
- Language: English
- Genre: Science fiction
- Publisher: Random House
- Publication date: 1973
- Publication place: United States
- Media type: Print (hardcover & paperback)
- Pages: 148
- ISBN: 0-394-47922-X
- OCLC: 415437
- Dewey Decimal: 813/.5/4
- LC Class: PZ4.G3765 Man PS3557.E69

The Man Who Folded Himself is a 1973 science fiction novel by American writer David Gerrold. It was nominated for the Nebula Award for Best Novel in 1974 and the Hugo Award for Best Novel in 1974. The book explores the psychological, physical, and personal challenges that manifest when time travel is possible for a single individual at the touch of a button.

== Plot summary ==
In 1975, Daniel Eakins, a young college student, is visited by his Uncle Jim. Uncle Jim offers to increase Daniel's monthly allowance for living expenses as long as Daniel promises to keep a diary. Shortly after, Uncle Jim dies, and Daniel inherits a "Time-belt" from him that allows the wearer to easily travel through time. Daniel quickly learns how to use the Time-belt and makes a few short jumps into his own future. He meets a future version of himself, who goes by "Don", who accompanies him to a race-track where the pair make a fortune betting on horse-racing.

The following day, Daniel realises that it is his turn to act as Don and guide his younger self through the previous day at the races. Through this and other events the time-travelling Daniel learns more about the belt, about the nature of the "timestream," and about his personal identity.

Daniel repeatedly encounters alternate versions of himself, sometimes known as Don, and enjoys his own company, ultimately having sex with himself and beginning a relationship with himself. He learns that the changes he has made to his timeline have erased all traces of his childhood and early life.

Though Daniel has been able to become closer to himself than he has in any other relationship, at some point he comes to find that he no longer meets other versions of himself. Lonely and hoping to correct the situation, he jumps many millennia backwards in time, where his jumps have not altered the timeline, and there he meets a female version of himself called "Diane". Diane's future is a mirror of Daniel's—she was given the Time-belt by her Aunt Jane, and she had also begun a relationship with her other selves, called Donna. Daniel begins a relationship with Diane and Diane becomes pregnant.

Daniel and Diane each secretly desire a son and a daughter, respectively, and unbeknownst to each other each uses technology from the future to make their own changes to ensure that Diane gives birth to a child with the desired gender. Shortly after the birth of their child, Daniel and Diane separate.

Daniel raises his son in 1950s America. As Daniel ages, he misses the relationship he had with Diane, but the interference of an obsessive, deranged version of himself has erased the point in the past where the two can meet. Daniel spends much of his time at a house party set in 1999, enjoying the company of dozens of versions of himself at different ages. At one point late in the party an elderly version of Daniel dies after a jump, and Daniel is consumed with the thought of his own inevitable death.

Daniel eventually realizes that he has now become his Uncle Jim, and that his son will grow up to be the young version of himself who will inherit the Time-belt, and that his life has "come full circle." He makes preparations for after his death to ensure that the young Daniel experiences the same events that Daniel did and has his own experiences with time travel.

The book ends with a young Daniel, who has read the now-complete diary, having to decide whether he will use the Time-belt.

== Updated edition ==
Mentions were added in the 2003 edition of both the American Airlines Flight 191 crash in May 1979 and the destruction of the World Trade Center Twin Towers on September 11, 2001, events which did not occur until 6 years and 28 years respectively after initial publication in 1973.

== Characters ==
Almost all of the different characters in the story are, in fact, alternate versions of Daniel from another point in time.

When Daniel first meets his future self from one day into the future, the future version identifies himself as "Don," ostensibly Daniel's twin brother. The next day, when it becomes Dan's turn to meet a version of himself from yesterday, he adopts the role of Don. (When a third Daniel appears, he is sometimes identified as Don II, or "ultra-Don".)

The female version of Danny has a similar relationship with alternate versions of herself; she is Diane when she meets a version of herself from the future, but when she plays the role of the future traveler she adopts the name Donna. Diane has an Aunt Jane, who is the elderly version of herself, and the female equivalent of Danny's "Uncle Jim".

After Daniel and Diane find out about Diane's pregnancy, each respectively desires a son and a daughter who is exactly like them. Unbeknownst to each other, they both obtain future technology to make their own changes, that ensure that Diane gives birth to the desired child. The contrary changes create a split between their timelines, in which they have either a son or daughter, and after their separation take the child of their own sex back to their own future, creating the closed time loops of the man and the woman.

The only named character who is not some version of Daniel is a lawyer who calls him on the phone to tell him of his Uncle Jim's death, and the lawyer is vaguely identified as "Biggs-or-Briggs-or-something".

== Critical reception from science fiction authors ==
Reviewing the novel in 1974 for Vector, Christopher Priest thought that Gerrold had unintentionally replicated the closed-loop timelines of Robert A. Heinlein's short stories "By His Bootstraps" (1941) and "'—All You Zombies—'" (1959, also featuring a protagonist who becomes his own parents), only less successfully. Priest commented that while it was "a polished, readable, clever book... [it lacks] even the most rudimentary forms of characterisation, subtlety, description or originality... is he going to get a Nebula? Probably."

Douglas Lain commented in 2012 that "The most interesting and perhaps most overlooked move that David Gerrold makes in his fractal time travel book The Man Who Folded Himself is that he writes the whole story in the second person without alerting you, the reader, directly to this fact." S. L. Huang wrote in 2019 that "The book folds in on itself like a fabulous origami of paradoxes that somehow make sense.... It is one of the best time-travel stories I have ever seen.... It is also very queer."

== See also ==
- There Will Be Time, a 1972 novel by Poul Anderson with similar concepts, also nominated for awards
- List of time travel works of fiction
