= Existential Comics =

American webcomic (2013-present) by Corey Mohler

- Author: Corey Mohler
- Website: existentialcomics.com
- Current status/schedule: Active
- Launch date: December 2013
- Genre: Philosophy

Existential Comics is a webcomic about philosophy created by Corey Mohler, a software engineer in Portland, Oregon.

== History ==
Mohler created the comic in December 2013 in an attempt to help popularize philosophy through comedy. The comic tends to depict philosophers of different backgrounds and often has them interacting and arguing with each other. It also gives textual descriptions of the jokes and associated philosophy to help educate readers. In May 2018, Mohler called Elon Musk "the villain from Atlas Shrugged". Musk responded during SpaceX's launch of a Falcon 9 rocket.

== Philosophers ==
As the name implies, existentialists are often featured in the comic. The comic has examinined a wide variety of thought from Pre-Socratic philosophy to contemporary philosophy. Mohler has described both Sartre and Simone de Beauvoir as his favorite philosophers. Alongside existentialism, Mohler has also written extensively about Stoicism.

== See also ==
- The Partially Examined Life
