= Water Is for Washing =

"Water is for Washing"
- Short story by Robert A. Heinlein
- Country: USA
- Language: English
- Genre: Science fiction

Publication
- Published in: Argosy
- Publication date: November 1947

"Water is for Washing" is a science fiction short story by American writer Robert A. Heinlein, first published in Argosy (November 1947). It is based on the premise that an earthquake had catastrophically shattered the range of alluvial deposits separating the Imperial Valley from the Gulf of California, precipitating a tsunami moving north to transiently drown these lowlands.

In his notes, Heinlein said that he had a dream in 1946 in which he conceived of the entire story.

== Plot summary ==
At the beginning of the story, Heinlein uses the character of a bartender in El Centro to establish the danger of the quake and inundation:

You've heard about the 1905 flood, when the Colorado River spilled over and formed the Salton Sea? But don't be too sure about quakes; valleys below sea level don't just grow — something has to cause them. The San Andreas Fault curls around this valley like a question mark. Just imagine the shake-up it must have taken to drop thousands of square miles below the level of the Pacific.

Heinlein's perspective character is a traveling businessman who had picked up two chance-encountered children and a vagrant while driving frantically to higher ground, and the dramatic arc centers on the efforts of the men to survive and save the youngsters from drowning.

== Publication ==
When the story was first published in Argosy, the editor removed the final two paragraphs. At the time, Heinlein was upset about this, as he stated they contained "the story's major symbolism." However when the story was later (1959) collected in one of Heinlein's anthologies, The Menace From Earth, the paragraphs were not re-added. The manuscript, and therefore the removed paragraphs, was believed lost until Heinlein biographer William H. Patterson, Jr. discovered them in a misplaced manuscript in the UC Santa Cruz archives.

== Relationship to other Heinlein works ==
Although not tied directly to other of Heinlein's works, "Water is for Washing" is one of several short stories that take place in contemporary Southern California with no change in the political, social, or technological environment. Heinlein had settled in California after being discharged from the Navy and incorporated his environment into his fiction. Like "Water is for Washing," "—And He Built a Crooked House—" and "The Year of the Jackpot" both take place partially in the desert areas east and north of Los Angeles, and involve earthquakes as plot points.

== Reception ==
Robert Wilfred Franson describes "Water is for Washing" as packing "a neater punch than many whole novels of natural disasters and human reactions to them....As usual, Heinlein mixes a physical life-and-death challenge with considerations of knowledge, self-discipline, empathy, and spirituality."

"Water Is for Washing" is simple and straightforward, quite vivid and realistic. If it speaks to our fears, those are traditional fears, and entirely reasonable in flash-flood areas of the low desert.

James Gifford describes "Water is for Washing" as "unusual" and "barely science fiction." He comments favorably on the attention to detail, both in the location and its temperature. He also points out that not many reader notice that the salesman and the tramp are never named, unusual for Heinlein. He draws a link to "They," in which the major characters are also not named.
