= Douglas Lain =

American novelist

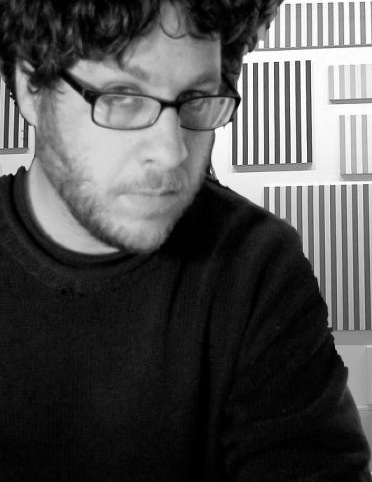
- Born: 1970
- Writing career
- Notable work: Bash Bash Revolution; Billy Moon; After the Saucers Landed

Douglas Lain (/leɪn/; born 1970) is an American writer whose books include the post-singularity novel Bash Bash Revolution from Night Shade Books, the magical realist novel Billy Moon from Tor Books, and the Philip K. Dick Award nominated novel After the Saucers Landed.

His short stories have appeared in genre magazines such as Interzone and Amazing Stories as well as in online publications such as Pif Magazine and Strange Horizons. He has written nonfiction as well as fiction and is a blogger for Thought Catalog and The Partially Examined Life. Lain's fiction has been generally well received by critics in journals and periodicals such as Locus Magazine (Rich Horton// Locus Magazine; January 2012, Issue 612, Vol. 68 No. 1), Publishers Weekly (Olson, Ray // Publishers Weekly; 19 December 2005, Vol. 252 Issue 50, p 46), and Rain Taxi magazine (Dole, Kevin//Rain Taxi; Vol. 11 No. 2, Summer 2006, #42).

Lain was the host of the philosophy podcast "Diet Soap" and the political podcast "Zero Squared". He was the publishing manager in charge of Zero Books from 2015 to October 2021. Following his departure from Zero Books, Lain joined the creative team at Sublation Media.

He lives in Portland, Oregon.

== Bibliography ==
=== Novels ===
- Bash Bash Revolution, Night Shade Books (2018)
- After the Saucers Landed, Night Shade Books (2015)
- Billy Moon, Tor Books (2013)

=== Novella ===
- "Wave of Mutilation", Fantastic Planet Press (2011)

=== Nonfiction ===
- Pick Your Battle, Funded through Kickstarter (2011)

=== Short story collections ===
- Fall into Time, Eraserhead Press (2011)
- Last Week's Apocalypse, Night Shade Books (2006)

=== Multiple author anthologies (editor) ===
- Deserts of Fire: Speculative Fiction and the Modern War, Night Shade Books (2016)
- In the Shadow of the Towers: Speculative Fiction in a Post-9/11 World, Night Shade Books (2015)
