= Sky Lift =

1953 short story by Robert A. Heinlein

Other usages: Skylift is an aerial tram or possibly a helicopter or an airlift.

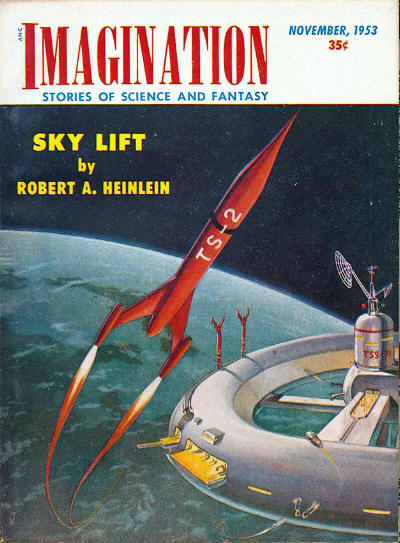
Heinlein's short story "Sky Lift" took the cover of the November 1953 issue of Imagination

"Sky Lift" is a science fiction short story by Robert A. Heinlein, first published 1953, and collected in Heinlein's The Menace from Earth.

In the story, a torchship pilot lights out from Earth orbit to Pluto on a mission to deliver a cure to a plague ravaging a research station. Due to the short time needed before everyone at the research station is dead and the long distance involved, the torchship must accelerate at multiple gravities (3.5 g) for many days. The mission is successful, but one of the two pilots is killed and the other is rendered an invalid due to the strain put on their bodies.
