= The Menace from Earth (short story collection) =

1959 collection of science fiction short stories by Robert A. Heinlein

The Menace From Earth
- First edition cover
- Author: Robert A. Heinlein
- Cover artist: W.I. van der Poel
- Language: English
- Genre: Science fiction
- Publisher: Gnome Press
- Publication date: 1959
- Publication place: United States
- Media type: Print (hardcover)
- Pages: 191

The Menace From Earth is a collection of science fiction short stories by American writer Robert A. Heinlein. It was published by The Gnome Press in 1959 in an edition of 5,000 copies.

== Contents ==
- "The Year of the Jackpot" (1952)
- "By His Bootstraps" (1941)
- "Columbus Was a Dope" (1947)
- "The Menace from Earth" (1957)
- "Sky Lift" (1953)
- "Goldfish Bowl" (1942)
- "Project Nightmare" (1953)
- "Water Is for Washing" (1947)

== Reception ==
Floyd C. Gale of Galaxy Science Fiction rated the collection 4.5 stars out of five. He said "The trouble with Heinlein is that once he explores a situation, not much is left to be said. His prototypes are up-to-the-minute masterworks," citing "By His Bootstraps" and the temporal paradox genre as an example.

Dave Pringle reviewed The Menace from Earth for Imagine magazine, and stated that "savour such short stories as 'The Year of the Jackpot', a manic end-of-the-world take, and 'By His Bootstraps', simply the best time-travel yarn since Wells. The early Heinlein was a Natural."

== Sources ==
- Chalker, Jack L.; Mark Owings (1998). The Science-Fantasy Publishers: A Bibliographic History, 1923-1998. Westminster, MD and Baltimore: Mirage Press, Ltd. p. 308.
- "The Fiction of Robert A. Heinlein".
