= Goldfish Bowl =

1942 science fiction short story by Robert A. Heinlein

"Goldfish Bowl" is a science fiction short story by American author Robert A. Heinlein, first published in Astounding Science Fiction in March 1942, and collected in one of Heinlein's anthologies, The Menace from Earth.

== Plot summary ==
In the story, two scientists and a navy ship investigate two massive pillars of water in the Pacific to discover if they are a natural phenomenon or, as one of the scientists conjectures, created by intelligent beings. His belief is based on another strange recent occurrence in the Pacific: "Lagrange fireballs", spheres of energy which move in a seemingly intelligent manner and appear to be responsible for the disappearance of people in Hawaii. While on the naval ship, more is learned about the pillars: one shoots water far up into the sky, where it enters a cloud-like formation which cannot be successfully entered and studied by aircraft or rockets, because their engines shut off when they try to enter the cloud. After an experiment, they confirm the other water pillar is linked to the first and returns the water back to the ocean. While one of the scientists is on deck preparing to ride up the water column in a bathysphere, an energy sphere appears; it engulfs him, and he disappears. The other scientist, still believing that there is an intelligence behind these phenomena, decides to take the other's place and ride in the bathysphere up the water column in hopes of finding his colleague and/or further insight. The two men find themselves in an utterly featureless (and inescapable) environment where they are provided solely with bland food and water. Eventually they are placed together, and they conclude that they are in the hands of other intelligences, possibly alien or possibly a much higher form of Earth life. From the complete lack of communicative contact, they decide that they are not even being studied but are merely being kept as pets, similar to the pet goldfish kept by one of the men. They may even have been put together in the hope that they will breed, suggesting that their captors know nothing of human biology.

When one of the scientists dies and his body is removed, the survivor believes that the only way back home is to die. Believing that it is imperative to warn humanity, he methodically scratches a message on the only medium available to him: his skin. The message is "Beware. Creation took eight days", the implication being that man was created only on the sixth day and a higher earthly being was created on the eighth. His body is ultimately recovered from the ocean, but the message is not understood.

== Reception ==
Floyd C. Gale of Galaxy Science Fiction praised "Goldfish Bowl" as one of the "up-to-the-minute masterworks" of The Menace from Earth.
