= Project Nightmare =

1953 science fiction short story by Robert A. Heinlein

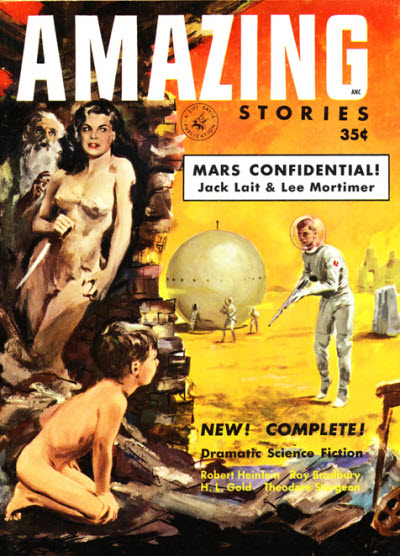
- "Project Nightmare" was originally published in the April–May 1953 issue of Amazing Stories
- Author: Robert A. Heinlein
- Language: English
- Genre: Science fiction
- Published: May 1953 (initial publication)
- Publication place: United States
- The story explores the use of clairvoyance and telekinetic abilities in preventing nuclear disasters during a Cold War scenario.

"Project Nightmare" is a science fiction short story by American writer Robert A. Heinlein, first published in Amazing Stories, May 1953, and reprinted in various collections, including The Menace from Earth.

== Plot summary ==
The story posits the reality of clairvoyance and telekinetic ability among a small number of people. In an opening scene, telekinetics are shown to be capable of causing a sub-critical mass of plutonium to explode as if it were a critical mass, simply by thinking about it (that is, by telekinetically enhancing its internal neutron emission). Conversely, they are able to prevent a critical mass from exploding. When the United States is held hostage with nuclear weapons planted around the nation by the Soviet Union, all known clairvoyants and telekinetic operators are gathered together and tasked with finding the bombs and preventing them from exploding. Each operator is given one city; but as time elapses and not all the bombs have been located, some of the operators lose their abilities through fatigue, and others are required to take on more than one city simultaneously. Eventually the bombs are found and disabled, with one exception (in Cleveland, when a project officer mistakenly distracts the protecting operator). In the final scene, the President requests that the psychics turn the tables on those who threatened them, by locating and exploding bombs in Russia.
