= Maurai =

The Maurai series is a series of short stories and a novel by Poul Anderson set in a resource depleted, post-apocalyptic earth several centuries in the future. The series is named after its most frequent protagonists, citizens of the Maurai Federation. The Maurai (originally descended from Māori peoples of N'Zealann and other Polynesians, but including a diverse array of ethnic and racial groups) dominate the Pacific and Indian Oceans. Fearful of the social and ecological implications of a return to large-scale industrial society, they use their considerable might and covert resources to prevent other nations from developing nuclear power.

In Orion Shall Rise, the novel that culminated the series, Anderson allowed for the possibility that a more equitable distribution of power, and an advanced, space-faring civilization, might evolve.

Other societies in the Maurai series include:

- The Northwest Union - a technological clan based society in the Pacific Northwest of North America
- The Five Nations of the Mong - a feudal society in the center of North America, where an elite descended from post-war Russian, Chinese and Mongol invaders rules over a serf class descended from US citizens
- The Domain of Skyholm, a class-based European society located in France, the Alps, and the Low Countries dominated by an ancient pre-war dirigible sky-city.
- Other European nations include Angleylann, divided into small statelets including Devon; Italya, the confederation of the Alemanns in central Europe; and the Zheneralship of Espanya in the Iberian Peninsula.
- In North America, various "Free Merican" states exist, including Corodo and the piratical "Sky People", who raid Meyco to the south with primitive airships.
- The story "Progress" takes place in Benghal, part of the Brahmard confederacy.
- An extremely patriarchal society is located in Khorasan.
- The island of Okkaido is a nation-state allied with the Maurai.
- There is a reference to an empire known as the "'Perio" having ruled much of America but having disintegrated before the time depicted in the stories.

== Stories in the Maurai series ==
- "The Sky People" (1959)
- "Progress" (1961)
- "Windmill" (1973)
- Maurai & Kith (collection of above, along with two unrelated ("Kith") stories; 1982)
- Orion Shall Rise (novel; 1983)
- In addition, the Maurai world is one of the many past and future times visited by the time-traveling protagonist of There Will Be Time (1972)

== See also ==
- Journey Beyond Tomorrow/Journey of Joenes, a novel by Robert Sheckley also depicting a post-apocalyptic world dominated by Polynesians
