= Journey Beyond Tomorrow =

1962 novel by Robert Sheckley

First edition (publ, Signet) Cover art by Paul Lehr

Journey Beyond Tomorrow is a satirical 1962 science fiction novel by the American writer Robert Sheckley.

The story was originally serialized (as The Journey of Joenes) in The Magazine of Fantasy & Science Fiction in October and November 1962, with a Signet paperback following a month later. The book has been reprinted under both titles, though most foreign-language editions have used the original one.

== Synopsis ==
A Candide-like social satire, the narrative is a mock-biography of an early 21st-century man named Joenes, notionally compiled in a post-apocalyptic civilization in the South Pacific around the 31st century.

From the editor's introduction, the reader learns that a great cataclysm destroyed the world in the early 21st century; that only fragmentary information from his era has survived, mostly in the form of oral tradition; that the teachings of the semi-legendary Joenes are one of two dominant world philosophies; and that the people of the future have a very garbled understanding of the past. (For example, a lengthy passage on the birth of the United States in chapter four heavily conflates American history with that of classical Greece.)

Born to American expatriates on the tiny Pacific island of Manituatu, Joenes loses his livelihood due to a corporate restructuring in far-off America, he decides to visit his late parents' homeland; there, he has a series of surreal encounters with different aspects of modern Western society. These encounters are often of a highly philosophical and discursive nature, and sometimes verge on magical realism.

After landing in San Francisco, Joenes meets Lum, a surprisingly-resourceful beatnik who will become his lifelong friend (as well as the founder of the other major philosophical school of the post-apocalyptic world.) Joenes tries peyote, gets into an argument on the nature of justice with a policeman, and is arrested. He is hauled before a McCarthyite Congressional commission, falsely accused of being a Communist, and remanded for sentencing to a mainframe computer tended by a priesthood of technicians (who - in a parody of the Oracle of Delphi - arrive at verdicts by freely interpreting its inane output of rhymed couplets.) Joenes receives a suspended sentence of ten years. He is released onto the streets of New York, where he encounters a friendly thief named Watts, who explains to him that many of the city's inhabitants are actually dead, but continue to go through the motions of life in an attempt to avoid discovery (and burial) by the living. Watts is driven away by a thuggish, sociopathic policeman, who shares his deranged philosophy of law and order with Joenes (and is about to assault him, before being distracted by a jaywalker.)

Next, a hitch-hiking Joenes is picked up by three disillusioned truck-drivers, each of whom somberly relates a lengthy philosophical disquisition on the ultimate emptiness of science, religion, and virtue. They drop him off at the Hollis Home for the Criminally Insane, where he once more encounters Lum. One of the inmates claims to be an incarnation of God, and can perform actual miracles, though the doctors consider these merely the proof of his lunacy. An attempt to meet this inmate fails when his cell turns up empty, with only a written message (which the doctor refuses to let Joenes see) left behind. A college professor visiting the Home to recruit new instructors offers Joenes a position.

In a broad satire of academia, Joenes is hired to teach a course on Polynesia at a college in Newark; the remainder of the faculty warm to him and take him to visit their intentional community in the Adirondacks, which they have populated with brainwashed volunteers and endowed with a constructed language and religion; faith in the latter is enforced by a synthetic gryphon-like monster, which murderously attacks the community unless meaningless averting rituals are undertaken.

Next, Joenes is recruited by the government and assigned to the "Octagon" (a larger replacement for the Pentagon). He gets lost in the vast building, as the map he had been given is wrong; while wandering, he encounters a military cartographer, who explains that all maps of the Octagon are deliberately corrupt in order to frustrate spies. This is followed by a lengthy monologue on the nature of secrets and truth, after which Joenes encounters a man named Theseus, who is hunting for a child-trafficking Octagon official named Edwin J. Minotaurus; Joenes eventually meets the latter, and is dispatched by him on an intelligence-gathering diplomatic mission to the Soviet Union.

In Moscow, three Soviet dignitaries attempt to clarify to Joenes the nature of a recent Sino-Soviet border incident which is not well understood in the West. Stripped of doublespeak and obfuscation, it turns out that the "border incident" had actually been a full-scale conventional war between the USSR and China, which has been successfully covered up by both sides. The war had ranged back-and-forth across the entire territories of both powers, and had inflicted a death toll in the tens or even hundreds of millions; the final result had been an anticlimactic restoration of the status quo ante.

Joenes' returning plane is mistaken for an enemy missile over California and attacked by automated air-defense systems, sparking World War III. Joenes winds up in an underground command bunker, where he once again runs into Lum - who had accidentally enlisted in the Army while on a cocaine binge, but has since found a rewarding sinecure as a senior general's personal pimp. The duo escape from the bunker, steal a sailboat, and head for Polynesia.

The final chapter is ostensibly by the book's unnamed editor; it details Joenes' and Lum's life on Manituatu, where they slowly become revered figures and begin to set the pattern for the new civilization taking shape across the Pacific. In time, a schism develops between the two; both men teach similar ethical principles, but Lum additionally advocates for a militant de-industrialization of society ("Man, you ever try to build an atom bomb out of coral and coconut shells?") To that end, his "Lumist" followers carry out violen raids in which they confiscate metal in order to throw it into the sea. (Lum himself is killed in a raid, at an advanced age, by the irate owner of a sewing machine.) The Lumists come to rule Fiji, where Lum's words are recorded as scripture.

Joenes' teachings are more subtle, and are only transmitted orally. They are mainly concerned with ethics and virtue, though the editor notes that towards the end of his life, Joenes became inclined toward maltheism, and spoke bitterly of the gods having created mankind as playthings for sadistic games. A foreigner washes up on Manituatu; it turns out to be the thief Watts, who has been seeking Joenes for decades in order to give him two items: a true map of the Octagon, and the message left by the vanished inmate of the Home for the Criminally Insane. Joenes reacts to the two items with shock, and wordlessly departs for the island's forested hinterland, never to be seen again.

== See also ==
- Maurai (contemporary non-satirical series by Poul Anderson, also depicting a post-apocalyptic world dominated by Polynesians)
