= Orion Shall Rise =

1983 novel by Poul Anderson

- First edition
- Author: Poul Anderson
- Cover artist: Darrell K. Sweet
- Language: English
- Genre: Science fiction, speculative fiction
- Publisher: Phantasia Press
- Publication date: 1983
- Publication place: United States
- Pages: 463
- ISBN: 0-932096-20-4

Orion Shall Rise is a science fiction novel by American writer Poul Anderson, published in 1983. It is part of his Maurai series.

== Premise ==
The novel is set several hundred years after a devastating nuclear war which has pushed back the level of technology.

The action focuses on four societies:

- The Northwest Union, a technological, clan-based society in the Pacific Northwest of North America
- The Five Nations of the Mong, a feudal society in the center of North America, where an elite descended from post-war Russian, Chinese and Mongol invaders rules over a serf class descended from American citizens.
- The Maurai Federation, an ecotopian society in the Pacific, dominated by the Maurai peoples of N'Zealann.
- The Domain of Skyholm, a class-based European society located in France, the Alps, and the Low Countries dominated by an ancient pre-war dirigible aerostat. The aerostat is of the STARS type (Solar Thermal Aerostat Research Station), first described in 1980.

Other nations mentioned include Angleylann, divided into small statelets including Devon, Italya, the confederation of the Alemanns in central Europe, the Zheneralship of Espanya in the Iberian Peninsula, Corodo and Meyco to the south of the Northwest Union. Brief mention is made of Benghal, part of the Brahmard confederacy mentioned in other Maurai stories, and an extremely patriarchal society located in Khorasan.

The novel follows a group of characters as they navigate tensions between several of the nations. The title derives from the Orion project, which one of the factions intends to resurrect.

The world depicted is full of historical paradoxes and apparent anachronisms, due to unequal economic and technological development in various regions and continents, and the inability of the resource-depleted world to fully use technologies which were retained or re-discovered.

- France is ruled by an English-speaking aristocracy - a precise mirror image of the situation of England after the Norman Conquest.
- The Skyholm aristocrats in France are feudal lords on the ground, and at the same time fly supersonic planes in the air.
- France has a feudal society like in the Middle Ages, and faces across the Rhine a Germany inhabited by barbarian tribes, as in the time of the Roman Empire.
- The Maurai Federation, a powerful maritime empire presided over by a Constitutional Queen, recalls the British Empire under Queen Victoria - but the Maurai Polynesian sexual mores are the very opposite of Victorian morality.
- The Northwest Union, like Weimar Germany, secretly builds weapons which were forbidden after its defeat in a previous war - and comes up with 19th Century style ironclads equipped with nuclear bombs.
