= The Year of the Jackpot =

1952 science fiction short story by Robert A. Heinlein

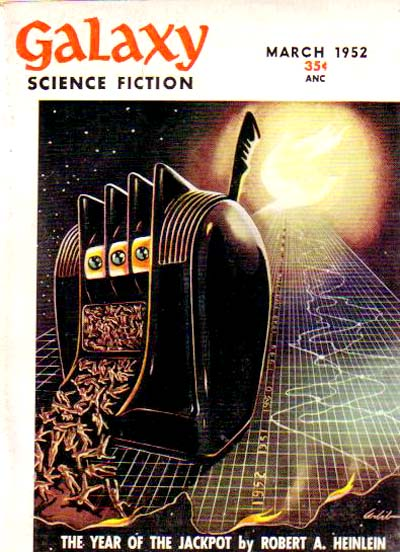
Cover of Galaxy issue of March March 1952, where the story was originally published.

"The Year of the Jackpot" is a science fiction short story by American writer Robert A. Heinlein, first published 1952, and collected in one of Heinlein's anthologies, The Menace from Earth.

In the story, a trend-following statistician finds romance and a disturbing conclusion. The story touches on recurrent Heinlein themes of survivalism and the prudishness of social mores of the time.

== Plot summary ==
Potiphar Breen is a middle-aged bachelor with a settled, orderly life, and a rather unusual hobby. We meet him first at breakfast in a Los Angeles diner, where he orders his usual meal, takes notes of various apparently unrelated items in several newspapers, and carefully counts out his payment, adding an exactly calculated tip. He then walks out to a bus stop, where a young lady is removing all her clothes.

A pair of passing transvestites try to provoke a beat cop into arresting her, but the cop refrains for fear that the publicity will simply inspire more kooks to disrobe. Breen is unmoved. He walks over and wraps his coat around her just as the bus arrives. He offers her a ride with the acquiescence of the cop who is known to him. She accepts reluctantly. He drives her to his house, lets her dress, and after explaining that he is not trying to take advantage of her, interviews her. She explains that she has no idea why she had the sudden urge to take her clothes off. He tells her why he was not surprised at what she did. Apparently women have been doing the same thing, all over the city, for some time. The news has been carefully hushed up, just as Breen himself called a friend at the newspaper and fed him a phony account of this incident.

Breen is a statistician. Working mostly for insurance companies, he advises them on probability and trends. In his spare time, he studies cycles. Human behavior seems to run in cycles, with prices, wages, hemlines, fashions, and entire economies crashing and rising again for no reason, except that each was following the ups and downs of a cycle. The cycles are of different lengths, so they do not often peak at the same time: three big cycles bottomed out in 1929, causing the Crash of 1929. It is now 1952, and every cycle he tracks will either trough or crest simultaneously in about six months.

Breen explains to Meade Barstow, the young lady, that "This year, the human race is letting down its hair, flipping its lip with a finger, and saying 'Wubba, wubba, wubba.'" Meade's striptease, along with the commonplace public transvestism, the new churches with their ceremonial nudity and all the other pieces of minor insanity are simply symptoms of the inexorable trends. As Breen puts it, while any one person may seem to be rational, in the bulk people behave statistically, whether they like it or not. "Meade," he says, "I think we're lemmings."

Meade and "Potty" grow close, and as the weeks pass and the craziness increases, both abandon their jobs and prepare for when it will be "time to jump." Breen has transport, supplies and a firearm or two. He plans to head for the Mojave Desert. Then the record drought breaks, and the skies open. They decide to leave. On the way, there is an earthquake. A hitch-hiker attempts to steal the car at gunpoint. Meade surprises Breen (and herself) by shooting the thief with a pistol that Breen had given her for self-defence. Far from the city, they are horrified when a nuclear explosion apparently destroys Los Angeles.

Living at an isolated cabin, they wait for things to stabilize. There has been a full-scale nuclear exchange, but the weather was so bad that few bombs reached their targets. Breen himself has had to shoot a group of marauding Russian soldiers. But now the cycles are leaving their peaks, and the world is starting to recover. Breen catches up on his reading, in journals of astrophysics. He comes across an article where the author calculates the exact conditions required to make the Sun explode in a nova, and even offers predictions about when in the life of the Sun this might occur.

Meade comes out of the cabin to join Potiphar and watch the sunset. There is a rather large sunspot on the Sun's face. Looking again at the article, Breen realizes that this has not just been a bad year, it is the final year. "Something funny is happening to the sunset," says Meade.

"No," replies Potiphar, "to the Sun."

== Reception ==
Floyd C. Gale of Galaxy Science Fiction described "The Year of the Jackpot" as a "frightening classic".

== See also ==
- Kondratiev wave
