= By His Bootstraps =

1941 science fiction novella by Robert A. Heinlein

- Short story by Robert A. Heinlein as Anson MacDonald
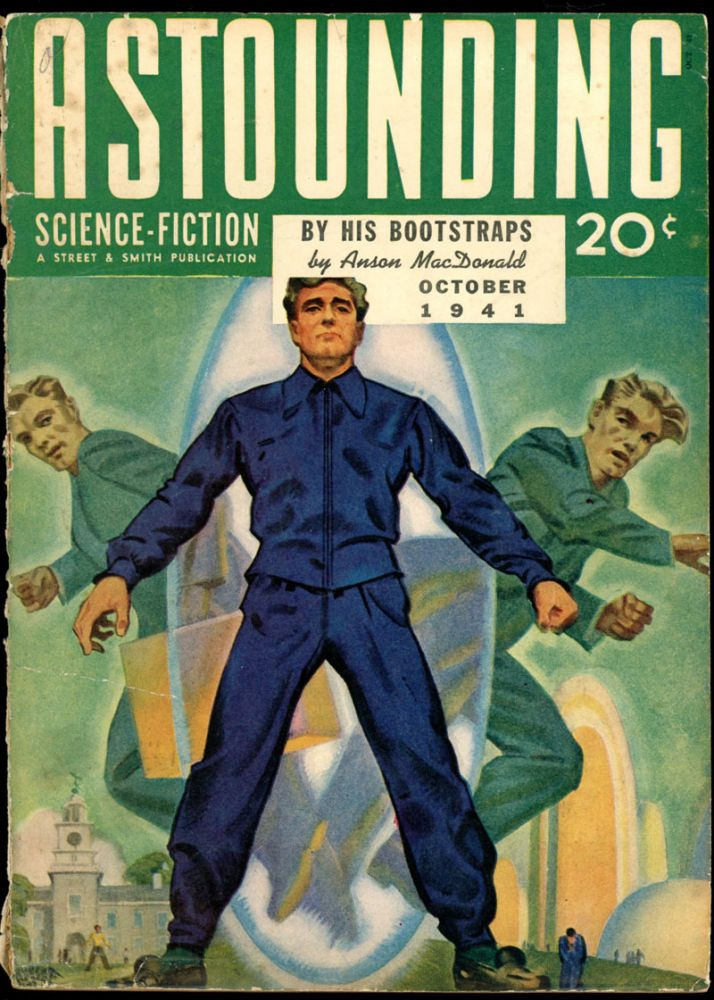
- Language: English
- Genre: Science fiction

Publication
- Published in: Astounding Science Fiction
- Media type: Magazine
- Publication date: October 1941

"By His Bootstraps" is a 20,000 word science fiction novella by American writer Robert A. Heinlein. It plays with some of the inherent paradoxes that would be caused by time travel.

The story was published in the October 1941 issue of Astounding Science Fiction under the pen name Anson MacDonald; the same issue has "Common Sense" under Heinlein's name. "By His Bootstraps" was reprinted in Heinlein's 1959 collection The Menace From Earth, and in several subsequent anthologies, and is now available in at least two audio editions. Under the title "The Time Gate", it was also included in a 1958 Crest paperback anthology, Race to the Stars.

== Plot summary ==
In 1952, Bob Wilson locks himself in his room to finish his graduate thesis on a mathematical aspect of metaphysics, using the concept of time travel as a case in point. Bob does not care much at this point whether his thesis (that time travel is impossible) is valid; he is desperate for sleep and just wants to get it done and typed up by the deadline the next day to become an academic, since he thinks academia beats working for a living. Suddenly, although Bob had locked himself alone in his room, someone says, “Don’t bother with it. It's a lot of utter hogwash anyhow." The interloper, who looks strangely familiar, and to whom Bob takes a dislike, calls himself "Joe", and explains that he has come from the future through a Time Gate, a circle about 6 ft (1.8 m) in diameter in the air behind Joe. Joe tells Bob that great opportunities await him through the Gate and thousands of years in his future. By way of demonstration, Joe tosses Bob's hat into the Gate. It disappears.

Bob is reluctant. Joe plies him with drink, which Joe (a stranger, from Bob's point of view) inexplicably retrieves from its hiding place in Bob's apartment, and Bob becomes intoxicated. Bob's talk with Joe is interrupted by odd phone calls, first from a man who sounds familiar, and then from his sometime girlfriend, who gets upset when Bob says he has not seen her recently. Finally, Joe is about to manhandle Bob through the Gate when another man appears, one who looks very much like Joe. The newcomer does not want Bob to go. During the ensuing fight, Bob gets punched, sending him through the Gate.

He recovers his senses in a strange place. A somewhat older-looking, bearded man explains that he has been sent forward in time some 30,000 years. The man, calling himself Diktor, treats Bob to a sumptuous breakfast served by beautiful women, one of whom Bob speaks of admiringly. Diktor immediately turns her service over to Bob. Diktor explains that the humans of this age are handsome, cultured in a primitive fashion, but much more docile and good natured than their ancestors. An alien race, the High Ones, built the Gate and refashioned humanity into compliant servants, but the High Ones have since departed from Earth, leaving a world where a 20th-century "go-getter" can make himself king.

Diktor asks him to go back through the Gate and bring back the man he finds on the other side, to Bob's agreement. Stepping through, he finds himself back in his own room, watching himself typing his thesis. Without much memory of what happened before, he reenacts the scene, this time from the other point of view, and calling himself "Joe" so as not to confuse his earlier self. Just as he is about to shove Bob through the Gate, another version of himself shows up. The fight happens as before, and Bob goes through the Gate.

His future self claims that Diktor is just trying to tangle them up so badly that they can never get untangled, but Joe goes through and meets Diktor again. Diktor gives him a list of things to buy in his own time and bring back. A little annoyed by Diktor's manner, Bob argues with him, but eventually returns to the past, back in his room once again.

He lives through the same scene for the third time, then realizes that he is now free of Diktor. Bob ponders the nature of the 20th-century society he lives in, finding it seedy and depressing. He is sure he no longer has time to finish his thesis, but it is obviously incorrect anyway, so he decides he will go back to the future through the Time Gate. While setting the Gate, he finds two things beside the controls: his hat, and a notebook containing translations between English and the language of Diktor's subjects. He returns to his own time and collects the items on Diktor's list, which seem to be things he could find useful in making himself king in the future, intentionally writing a bad check for the purchases, after persuading the cashier that the check is good. He then visits a woman he had been dating, but has begun to dislike, and has his way with her, smugly intending to never see her again, and leaving his hat in her apartment. He phones his past self as a prank, quickly hanging up. After returning to the future, he adjusts the Gate to send himself back to a point ten years earlier, to give himself time to establish himself as the local chieftain. In doing so he hopes to preempt Diktor's influence, charting his own course instead.

Bob sets himself up as chief, taking precautions against the arrival of Diktor. He even adopts the name Diktor, which is simply the local word for "chief." He experiments with the Time Gate, hoping to see the High Ones. Once, he does catch a glimpse of one and has a brief mental contact with it. The experience is so traumatizing that he runs away screaming, for the creature feels such sadness and other deep emotions that a 20th-century go-getter like Bob cannot bear it. He forces himself to return long enough to shut down the Gate, then stays away from it for more than two years. He does not notice that his hair has begun to whiten prematurely as a result of the stress and shock. Having worn out the notebook through long use, he copies its text into a new, identical one.

One day, upon setting the Gate to view his old room in the past, he sees three versions of himself in a familiar arrangement. Shortly, his earliest self comes through; he is Diktor—the only Diktor there ever was. Wondering who actually compiled the notebook, Diktor prepares to brief Bob, who has to orchestrate events to ensure his own past.

== Reception ==
Floyd C. Gale of Galaxy Science Fiction said of "By His Bootstraps", "In 18 years I haven't seen its equal" as a temporal-paradox story. Philosopher David Lewis considered "By His Bootstraps" and "'—All You Zombies—'" to be examples of "perfectly consistent" time travel stories. Stating that it and other Heinlein time-travel stories "force the reader into contemplations of the nature of causality and the arrow of time", Carl Sagan listed "By His Bootstraps" as an example of how science fiction "can convey bits and pieces, hints and phrases, of knowledge unknown or inaccessible to the reader".

== See also ==
- "'—All You Zombies—'"
- Bootstrapping, from the saying "to pull yourself up by your bootstraps"
- Causal loop
- Grandfather paradox
- The Man Who Folded Himself
