= Moonstar Odyssey =

1977 novel by David Gerrold

- First edition
- Author: David Gerrold
- Language: English
- Genre: science fiction
- Published: 1977
- Publisher: Signet Books
- Publication place: United States

Moonstar Odyssey (also known as Moonstar) is a 1977 science fiction novel by American writer David Gerrold.

The novel was a Nebula Award nominee for best novel of 1977.

== Plot ==
In the distant future a planet settled by humans was once all airless moon rock. Human terraforming has transformed the moon into a world of shallow oceans and islands which are the peaks for the former moon craters.

A young girl, Jobe, is sent to Option, the island of learning on the planet, to decide who she must be. When one of the gigantic opaque plasma shields that surround and protect the planet is destroyed, Jobe realizes she must begin her quest that the moonstar has destined for her long ago.
