= '—All You Zombies—' =

1958 SF short story by Robert A. Heinlein

" '—All You Zombies—' "
- Short story by Robert A. Heinlein
- Country: United States
- Language: English
- Genre: Science fiction

Publication
- Published in: The Magazine of Fantasy and Science Fiction
- Publication date: 1959

" '—All You Zombies—' " (Note: Quotation marks and dashes are used around the story's title (in one of its common variants), with the phrase being a fragmentary quotation. (The outer quotation marks here, however, are simply the conventional notation for indicating that this is the title of a short story.)) is a science fiction short story by American writer Robert A. Heinlein. It was written in one day, July 11, 1958, and first published in the March 1959 issue of The Magazine of Fantasy & Science Fiction after being rejected by Playboy.

The story involves a number of paradoxes caused by time travel. In 1980, it was nominated for the Balrog Award for short fiction.

"'—All You Zombies—'" further develops themes explored by the author in a previous work: "By His Bootstraps", published some 18 years earlier. Some of the same elements also appear later in The Cat Who Walks Through Walls (1985), including the Circle of Ouroboros and the Temporal Corps.

The title of the story, which includes both the quotation marks and dashes shown above, is a quotation from a sentence near the end of the story; the quotation is taken from the middle of the sentence, hence the dashes indicating elided text before and after the title.

== Plot synopsis ==
"'—All You Zombies—'" chronicles a character who is introduced as a young man, and later revealed to be intersex and raised as a woman. He was taken back in time and tricked into impregnating his younger self, before he was forced to undergo sexual reassignment surgery. He also turns out to be the offspring of that union, with the paradoxical result that he is his own mother and father.

As the story unfolds, all the major characters are revealed to be the same person, at different stages of their life.

=== Narrative order of events ===
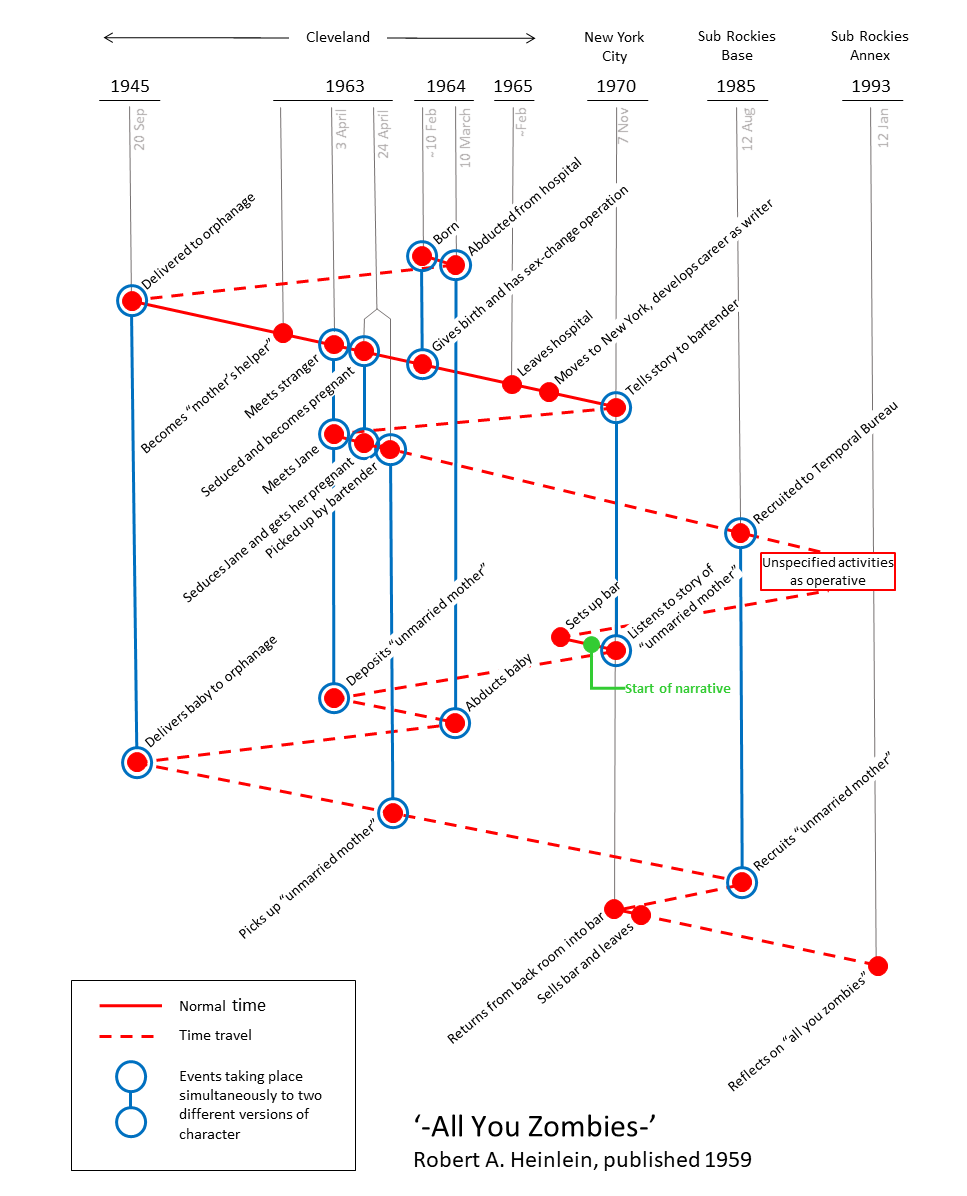
Timeline of "'—All You Zombies—'" in diagrammatic form

The story involves an intricate series of time-travel journeys (see diagram). It begins with a young man speaking to the narrator, the Bartender, in 1970. The two of them relate in that both of them are from unmarried parents. The Bartender remarks that no one in his family ever gets married, including him. He wears an Ouroboros ring. The young man is called the Unmarried Mother, because he writes stories for confession magazines, many of them presumably from the point of view of an unmarried mother.

Cajoled by the Bartender, the Unmarried Mother explains why he understands the female viewpoint so well: he was born a girl, in 1945, and raised in an orphanage. While a fairly ugly teenager in 1963, she was seduced, impregnated, and abandoned by an older man. During the delivery of her child, doctors discovered she was intersex, with internalized male sex organs as well as female sex organs. Complications during delivery, by Caesarean section, rendered the female organs unviable and the physicians gave her a gender reassignment. The baby was kidnapped by a mysterious older gentleman, and not seen again. The Unmarried Mother then had to adjust to life as a man, despite an upbringing that left him unqualified for "men's" jobs; he had planned to get into space as a sex worker for male workers and colonists. Instead, he used his secretarial skills to type manuscripts and eventually began writing.

Professing sympathy, the Bartender offers to take him to the abandoning seducer, whom the Unmarried Mother wishes revenge on. The Bartender guides him into a back room, where he (Bartender) uses a time machine to take them to 1963, and sets the young man loose. The Bartender goes forward eleven months, kidnaps a one-month-old baby, and takes her to 1945, leaving her at an orphanage. He returns to 1963 one month later and picks up the Unmarried Mother, who was instinctively attracted to his younger self and has seduced and impregnated her. The Bartender nudges him to connect the dots and realize that the seducer, the young woman, the baby, and the time traveler are all him.

The Bartender then drops the Unmarried Mother in 1985 at an outpost of the Temporal Bureau, a time-traveling secret police force that manipulates events in history, to protect the human race. He has just created and recruited himself.

Finally, the Bartender returns to 1970, arriving a short time after he left the bar. He allows a customer to play "I'm My Own Grandpa" on the jukebox, having yelled at the customer for playing the song before he left. Closing the bar, he time travels again to his home base in 1993. As he beds down for a much-deserved rest, he contemplates the scar left over from the Caesarean section performed when he gave birth to his daughter, father, mother, and entire history. He thinks, "I know where I came from—but where did all you zombies come from?"

=== Chronological order of events ===
As the story is told as a disjointed point of view reference by several other points thereafter, this is the actual chronological history of "Jane" according to the story, although the story itself is still a classic example of a time paradox.

1. On September 20, 1945, the Bartender drops off baby Jane at an orphanage. She grows up there. She dreams of joining one of the "comfort organizations" dedicated to providing R&R for spacemen.
2. Nearly 18 years later, the man who refers to himself as "an unmarried mother" is dropped off on April 3, 1963, by the Bartender. He meets and, after some weeks of dating, seduces and impregnates the 17-year-old Jane, who has an intersex condition. From Jane's point of view, he then disappears. Actually, he has been retrieved by the Bartender, and taken to 1985 (see sixth bullet point).
3. Jane learns that she is pregnant by the now-missing unknown man. On waking after giving birth by C-section, she is told she is intersex and has two full sets of reproductive organs, of which the female organs have developed fully, allowing her to have a child. She is told the female organs have been severely damaged by the pregnancy and birth; she learns that she has been subjected (without her consent) to a "sex change" using her male reproductive set, which reassigns her sex to male.
4. On March 10, 1964, the Bartender kidnaps Jane's baby and takes it back in time to the orphanage (see first bullet point). Jane, now male, becomes a stenographer, and then a writer. Whenever he is asked his occupation, he replies, somewhat truculently, "I'm an unmarried mother—at four cents a word. I write confession stories." He becomes a regular at the bar where the narrator, the Bartender, works, but does not interact with him significantly for six years.
5. On November 7, 1970, the Bartender meets the Unmarried Mother, yells at the customer playing "I'm My Own Grandpa", conducts the Unmarried Mother into the back office, and takes him back to 1963 to "find" (and, ostensibly, get revenge upon) the man who got him pregnant (see second bullet point). He returns to the bar, seconds after going into the back room, and allows the customer to play the song. From his own point of view, he has carried out his mission of ensuring his own existence.
6. On August 12, 1985, the Bartender travels to 1963 and retrieves the Unmarried Mother—whom he had left there and then during the events of the fifth (and second) bullet point(s)—to the Rocky Mountains base and enlists him (actually a younger version of himself) in the Temporal Bureau.
7. On January 12, 1993, the Bartender, who is also Jane/mother/father/Unmarried Mother, arrives back at his base from 1970 to think about his life.

== Reception ==
Philosopher David Lewis considered "'—All You Zombies—'" and "By His Bootstraps" to be examples of "perfectly consistent" time travel stories. Stating that it and other Heinlein time-travel stories "force the reader into contemplations of the nature of causality and the arrow of time", Carl Sagan listed "'—All You Zombies—'" as an example of how science fiction "can convey bits and pieces, hints and phrases, of knowledge unknown or inaccessible to the reader". Stanisław Lem, in his monograph Science Fiction and Futurology, mentioned "'—All You Zombies—'" as an example of a minimal possible bootstrap paradox in SF.

== Film adaptation ==
The Spierig brothers directed the Australian science fiction film Predestination (2014) based on the story. The film starred Ethan Hawke and Sarah Snook.

== See also ==
- "By His Bootstraps" – 1941 science fiction novella by Robert A. Heinlein
- Predestination paradox – Theoretical paradox resulting from time travel, for which the Novikov self-consistency principle has been presented as a potential solution.
- Ontological paradox – Theoretical paradox resulting from time travel

=== Other stories about being descended from oneself ===
- The Man Who Folded Himself – 1973 novel by David Gerrold
- Rant: An Oral Biography of Buster Casey – 2007 book by Chuck Palahniuk

=== In television ===
- "Ouroboros" (Red Dwarf episode)
- "Roswell That Ends Well" (Futurama episode)

== General sources ==
- Robert A. Heinlein. Grumbles from the Grave. Del Rey, 1989.
- James Gifford. "The New Heinlein Opus List" from Robert A. Heinlein: A Reader's Companion
