= The Dingilliad =

Series of science fiction novels by David Gerrold

The Dingilliad is a series of science fiction novels by American writer David Gerrold. The trilogy is published under the title The Far Side of the Sky. It is also known as The Starsiders Trilogy, although The Dingilliad is the name given by the author. The latter refers to Dingillian, the surname of the family of main characters, and is a pun on the Iliad. The books are often compared to Robert A. Heinlein's juvenile novels.

The books in the series include: Jumping Off the Planet (2000), Bouncing Off the Moon (2001) and Leaping to the Stars (2002). A fourth book, long mooted by the author, finally became 2020's Hella.

== Jumping off the Planet ==
It was originally written as a novella and was nominated for the Nebula Award and the HOMer Award. This novella was then expanded to a novel of the same title and won the Hal Clement (young adult) Golden Duck Award and the Gaylactic Spectrum Award, and was also nominated for a Lambda Award for science fiction and a second HOMer award.
