= Star Wolf (novel series) =

Series of science fiction novels by David Gerrold

The Star Wolf series is a series of science fiction novels by American writer David Gerrold, centred on the starship Star Wolf and its crew. The Star Wolf is a "Liberty Ship", officially designated the LS-1187. Plagued by misfortune throughout the series, without any confirmed kills to its credit, it was denied a name by Command.

== Antagonists ==
The main antagonists are the members of the Morthan Solidarity, originally a group of genetically improved humans.

"Voyage..." explains that while a rational mind would have tried to improve rationality in genetic modifications, humans improved self-preservation and physical attributes. Sociologically, they were educated not to be a subspecies, but a superspecies of humanity. Their name is a neologism for "more than". 1,500 years before "Voyage of the Star Wolf", the most aggressive and highly evolved Morthans broke away from the human sphere and invented a highly ritualised culture far from human-inhabited space, genetically improving every generation in comparison to the last. It is rumoured in "Voyage..." that reproduction is exclusively through artificial wombs; as the Morthans are said to waste nothing and allocate resources to maximum effect, it is speculated that Morthans would consider it wasteful to breed a woman when for the same investment, they could also get a full warrior.

A full-blown war erupts in the course of "Voyage of the Star Wolf", as the Morthan Solidarity starts an offensive against the Terran Alliance.

== Books ==
- Voyage of the Star Wolf (1990)
- The Middle of Nowhere (1995)
- Blood and Fire (2004), which is a rewrite of a planned Star Trek: The Next Generation script featuring gay characters and an AIDS metaphor.
- Yesterday's Children (1972), later significantly expanded and republished as Starhunt (1985). It occurs before the other novels in the series' main continuity but is not perfectly consistent with them. The original germ of this story was in the framing story of Gerrold's early proposed 2-part Star Trek episode "Tomorrow Was Yesterday". The central story, without the frame, eventually became Gerrold's Star Trek novel The Galactic Whirlpool.

== Planned adaptations ==
Gerrold had planned to develop this concept into a TV series, as he writes in an introduction to Voyage of the Star Wolf. In 2013, Gerrold, along with D. C. Fontana and David C Fein, launched a Kickstarter campaign to fund a television series, which as of June of that year had raised $52,000 of its $650,000 goal.
