= The Partially Examined Life =

Philosophy podcast and audiobook

- Official Logo for the Podcast, drawn by Ken Gerber
- Genre: Philosophy
- Format: Guided discussion / Informal conversation
- Language: English

Creative team
- Created by: Mark Linsenmayer
- Written by: Various

Cast and voices
- Starring: Mark Linsenmayer, Seth Paskin, Wes Alwan, Dylan Casey

Music
- Theme music composed by: Mark Linsenmayer

Production
- Length: 90 minutes - 130 minutes

Publication
- No. of episodes: 314
- Original release: May 11, 2009
- Updates: Periodic

Related
- Website: https://www.partiallyexaminedlife.com

The Partially Examined Life is a podcast and downloadable audio series about philosophy. It is self-described at the beginning of many episodes as "a philosophy podcast by some guys who were at one point set on doing philosophy for a living, but then thought better of it." The most frequent participants are Mark Linsenmayer, Seth Paskin, Wes Alwan, and Dylan Casey. The show also sometimes brings on experts to discuss particular topics. The podcast's website also hosts other podcasts: music-based Nakedly Examined Music, Phi Fic: Truth in Fiction, Combat & Classics and Constellary Tales.

== History ==
The show came together as the brain child of Mark Linsenmayer who reached out to Seth Paskin and Wes Alwan to do the show in the format of a podcast. Mark, Seth, and Wes had been classmates at the University of Texas while earning their master's degrees in Philosophy. The first full episode, "The Unexamined Life Is Not Worth Living," aired (became downloadable) on May 12, 2009. Dylan Casey later joined the program as a regular after previously having been a frequent guest. Dylan also manages The Partially Examined Life website. In 2024, they released a companion book of the same name to coincide with the show's 15th anniversary.

=== Awards ===
Award	Year	Category	Result	Ref.
Academy of Podcasters	2015	Ideas & Education	Finalist	

=== References to The Partially Examined Life ===
- The A.V. Club discussed The Partially Examined Life in their publication for the week of February 23–29.
- The National Catholic Reporter mentioned The Partially Examined Life in a blog post on Kierkegaard on February 27, 2012.
- Bad Philosophy Podcast episode 116 mentions The Partially Examined Life.
- Artist Dennis Hollingsworth mentioned The Partially Examined Life in a post on his website, referring to Episode six on Leibniz.
- Well-known American art critic and philosopher Arthur Danto, whose essays "The Appreciation and Interpretation of Works of Art," and "The End of Art" were the subject of Episode 16 "Danto on Art," listened to and enjoyed the program. He later wrote to the show and suggested follow up readings.
- The Partially Examined Life was reviewed by Colin Marshall of Maximum Fun on January 2, 2012.
- Patricia Churchland, well known Canadian-American philosopher and author, appeared on the podcast to discuss her work "Braintrust: What neuroscience tells us about Morality" in Episode 41.
- Slate's Stephen Metcalf talks up The Partially Examined Life on the Culture Gabfest.

== List of episodes ==
The following is an incomplete list of official episodes of The Partially Examined Life. The podcasters have also released music, pre-episodes ("Precognitions"), and other non "official episode" media. This list includes only the official, numbered episodes of the podcast.

No.	Title	Participants	Original release date
0	"Introduction To The Podcast"	Mark Linsenmayer, Seth Paskin, Wes Alwan	May 11, 2009
1	"The Unexamined Life Is Not Worth Living (released in two parts)"	Mark Linsenmayer, Seth Paskin, Wes Alwan	May 12, 2009
2	"Descartes's Meditations: What Can We Know?"	Mark Linsenmayer, Seth Paskin, Wes Alwan	May 13, 2009
3	"Hobbes's Leviathan: The Social Contract"	Mark Linsenmayer, Seth Paskin, Wes Alwan	June 7, 2009
4	"Camus and the Absurd"	Mark Linsenmayer, Seth Paskin, Wes Alwan	June 22, 2009
5	"Aristotle's Nicomachean Ethics"	Mark Linsenmayer, Seth Paskin, Wes Alwan	July 16, 2009
6	"Leibniz's Monadology: What Is There?"	Mark Linsenmayer, Seth Paskin, Wes Alwan	July 31, 2009
7	"Wittgenstein's Tractatus" What Is There and Can We Talk About It"	Mark Linsenmayer, Seth Paskin, Wes Alwan	August 19, 2009
8	"Wittgenstein's Tractatus (and Carnap): What Can We Legitimately Talk About?"	Mark Linsenmayer, Seth Paskin, Wes Alwan	September 4, 2009
9	"Utilitarian Ethics: What Should We Do?"	Mark Linsenmayer, Seth Paskin, Wes Alwan	September 18, 2009
10	"Kantian Ethics: What Should We Do?"	Mark Linsenmayer, Seth Paskin, Wes Alwan	October 19, 2009
11	"Nietzsche's Immoralism: What is Ethics, Anyway?"	Mark Linsenmayer, Seth Paskin, Wes Alwan	November 10, 2009
12	"Chuang Tzu's Taoism: What Is Wisdom?"	Mark Linsenmayer, Seth Paskin, Wes Alwan	December 6, 2009
13	"What Are The Metaphysical Implications of Quantum Physics?"	Mark Linsenmayer, Seth Paskin, Wes Alwan, and Dylan Casey	January 3, 2010
14	"Machiavelli on Politics"	Mark Linsenmayer, Seth Paskin, Wes Alwan	February 7, 2010
15	"Hegel on History"	Mark Linsenmayer, Seth Paskin, Wes Alwan	February 24, 2010
16	"Danto on Art"	Mark Linsenmayer, Seth Paskin, Wes Alwan	March 4, 2010
17	"Hume's Empiricism: What Can We Know?"	Mark Linsenmayer, Seth Paskin, Wes Alwan	March 29, 2010
18	"Plato: What Is Knowledge?"	Mark Linsenmayer, Seth Paskin, Wes Alwan	April 20, 2010
19	"Kant: What Can We Know?"	Mark Linsenmayer, Seth Paskin, Wes Alwan, Azzurra Crispino	May 14, 2010
20	"Pragmatism - Pragmatism - Peirce and James"	Mark Linsenmayer, Seth Paskin, Wes Alwan and Dylan Casey	June 9, 2010
21	"What Is The Mind? (Turing, et al)"	Mark Linsenmayer, Seth Paskin, Wes Alwan	June 28, 2010
22	"More James's Pragmatism: Is Faith Justified? What Is Truth?"	Mark Linsenmayer, Seth Paskin, Wes Alwan and Dylan Casey	July 18, 2010
23	"Rousseau: Human Nature vs. Culture"	Mark Linsenmayer, Seth Paskin, Wes Alwan	July 29, 2010
24	"Spinoza on God and Metaphysics"	Mark Linsenmayer, Seth Paskin, Wes Alwan	August 24, 2010
25	"Spinoza on Human Nature"	Mark Linsenmayer, Seth Paskin, Wes Alwan	September 10, 2010
26	"Freud on The Human Condition"	Mark Linsenmayer, Seth Paskin, Wes Alwan	September 25, 2010
27	"Nagarjuna on Buddhist "Emptiness""	Seth Paskin, Wes Alwan, and Erik Douglas	October 10, 2010
28	"Nelson Goodman on Art as Epistemology"	Mark Linsenmayer, Seth Paskin, Wes Alwan and Jay Bailey	October 31, 2010
29	"Kierkegaard on The Self"	Mark Linsenmayer, Seth Paskin, Wes Alwan and Daniel Horne	November 21, 2010
30	"Schopenhauer on Explanations and Knowledge"	Mark Linsenmayer, Seth Paskin, Wes Alwan	December 19, 2010
31	"Husserl's Phenomenology"	Mark Linsenmayer, Seth Paskin, Wes Alwan	January 10, 2011
32	"Heidegger: What is Being?"	Mark Linsenmayer, Seth Paskin, Wes Alwan	February 7, 2011
33	"Montaigne: What Is the Purpose of Philosophy?"	Mark Linsenmayer, Wes Alwan, Dylan Casey	February 18, 2011
34	"Frege on the Logic of Language"	Mark Linsenmayer, Seth Paskin, Wes Alwan, Matt Teichman (host of Elucidations)	March 13, 2011
35	"Hegel on Self-Consciousness"	Mark Linsenmayer, Seth Paskin, Wes Alwan, Tod McDonald	April 10, 2011
37	"Locke on Political Power"	Mark Linsenmayer, Seth Paskin, Wes Alwan, Sabrina Weiss	May 6, 2011
38	"Bertrand Russell on Math and Logic"	Mark Linsenmayer, Wes Alwan, John Pelton	May 25, 2011
39	"Schleiermacher Defends Religion"	Mark Linsenmayer, Wes Alwan, Daniel Horne	June 10, 2011
40	"Plato's Republic: What Is Justice?"	Mark Linsenmayer, Wes Alwan, Dylan Casey	July 11, 2011
41	"Pat Churchland on the Neurology on Morality (Plus Hume's Ethics)"	Mark Linsenmayer, Dylan Casey, and Patrica Churchland	July 18, 2011
42	"Feminists on Human Nature and Moral Psychology"	Mark Linsenmayer, Seth Paskin, Dylan Casey, Azzurra Crispino	September 5, 2011
43	"Arguments for the Existence"	Mark Linsenmayer, Seth Paskin, Wes Alwan, Robert Scott	October 11, 2011
44	"New Atheist Critiques of Religion"	Mark Linsenmayer, Seth Paskin, Wes Alwan, Dylan Casey	October 29, 2011
45	"Moral Sense Theory: Hume and Smith"	Mark Linsenmayer, Seth Paskin, Wes Alwan, Getty Lustila	September 15, 2011
46	"Plato on Ethics & Religion"	Mark Linsenmayer, Seth Paskin, Wes Alwan, Dylan Casey, Matt Evans	November 16, 2011
47	"Satire and Consciousness and the Self"	Mark Linsenmayer, Seth Paskin, Wes Alwan, Dylan Casey	November 30, 2011
48	"Merleau-Ponty on Perception and Knowledge"	Mark Linsenmayer, Seth Paskin, Wes Alwan, Dylan Casey	December 17, 2011
49	"Foucault on Power and Punishment"	Mark Linsenmayer, Seth Paskin, Wes Alwan, Dylan Casey and Katie McIntyre	January 11, 2012
50	"Pirsig's Zen and the Art of Motorcycle Maintenance"	Mark Linsenmayer, Seth Paskin, Dylan Casey, David Buchanan	February 3, 2012
51	"Semiotics and Structuralism (Saussure, et, al)"	Mark Linsenmayer, Wes Alwan, Dylan Casey, C. Derick Varn	February 24, 2012
53	"Philosophy and Race (DuBois Martin Luther King, Cornel West)"	Mark Linsenmayer, Seth Paskin, Wes Alwan, Dylan Casey, Lawrence Ware	March 17, 2012
53	"Buddhism and Naturalism with Guest Owen Flanagan"	Mark Linsenmayer, Seth Paskin, Wes Alwan, Dylan Casey, Owen Flanagan	March 26, 2012
54	"More Buddhism and Naturalism"	Mark Linsenmayer, Seth Paskin, Wes Alwan, Dylan Casey,	April 6, 2012
55	"Wittgenstein on Language"	Mark Linsenmayer, Seth Paskin, Wes Alwan, Dylan Casey, Philosophy Bro	May 2, 2012
56	"More Wittgenstein on Language"	Mark Linsenmayer, Wes Alwan, Dylan Casey, Philosophy Bro	May 14, 2012
57	"Henri Bergson on Humor"	Mark Linsenmayer, Seth Paskin, Wes Alwan, Dylan Casey, Jennifer Dziura	May 31, 2012
58	"What Grounds Ethical Claims? (Moore, Stevenson, MacIntyre)"	Mark Linsenmayer, Seth Paskin, Wes Alwan, Dylan Casey	June 20, 2012
60	"Aristotle: What's the best Form Of Government"	Mark Linsenmayer, Seth Paskin, Wes Alwan, Dylan Casey	July 22, 2012
61	"Nietzsche on Truth and Skepticism"	Mark Linsenmayer, Seth Paskin, Wes Alwan, Dylan Casey, and Jessica Berry	August 15, 2012
62	"Voltaire’s Novel “Candide”"	Mark Linsenmayer, Seth Paskin, Wes Alwan, Dylan Casey, (recorded together in Madison, WI)	September 5, 2012
63	"Existentialist Heroes in Cormac McCarthy’s “No Country for Old Men”"	Mark Linsenmayer, Seth Paskin, Wes Alwan, Dylan Casey, Eric Petrie	September 21, 2012
64	"Celebrity, with guest Lucy Lawless"	Mark Linsenmayer, Seth Paskin, Wes Alwan, Dylan Casey, Lucy Lawless	October 6, 2012
65	"Then Federalist Papers"	Mark Linsenmayer, Seth Paskin, Wes Alwan, Dylan Casey	October 27, 2012
66	"Quine on Linguistic Meaning and Science"	Mark Linsenmayer, Seth Paskin, Wes Alwan, Dylan Casey, Matt Teichman	November 21, 2012
67	"Carnap on Logic and Science"	Mark Linsenmayer, Wes Alwan, Dylan Casey, Matt Teichman	December 7, 2012
68	"David Chalmers Interview on the Scrutability of the World"	Mark Linsenmayer, Seth Paskin Wes Alwan, Dylan Casey,	December 21, 2012
69	"Plato on Rhetoric vs. Philosophy"	Mark Linsenmayer, Seth Paskin, Wes Alwan, Dylan Casey,	January 12, 2013
70	"Marx on The Human Condition"	Mark Linsenmayer, Seth Paskin, Wes Alwan,	January 30, 2013
71	"Martin Buber’s “I and Thou”"	Mark Linsenmayer, Seth Paskin, Wes Alwan, Daniel Horne	February 15, 2013
72	"Terrorism with Jonathan R. White"	Mark Linsenmayer, Seth Paskin, Wes Alwan, Dylan Casey, Jonathan R. White	March 9, 2013
73	"Why Do Philosophy? (And What Is It?)"	Mark Linsenmayer, Seth Paskin, Wes Alwan, Dylan Casey	March 22, 2013
74	"Jacques Lacan’s Psychology"	Mark Linsenmayer, Seth Paskin, Wes Alwan, Dylan Casey	April 3, 2013
75	"Lacan & Derrida Criticize Poe’s “The Purloined Letter”"	Mark Linsenmayer, Seth Paskin, Dylan Casey	April 19, 2013
76	"Deleuze on What Philosophy Is"	Mark Linsenmayer, Seth Paskin, Dylan Casey, Daniel Coffeen	May 14, 2013
77	"Santayana on the Appreciation of Beauty"	Mark Linsenmayer, Seth Paskin, Wes Alwan, Dylan Casey,	June 9, 2013
78	"Ayn Rand on Living Rationally"	Mark Linsenmayer, Seth Paskin, Wes Alwan, Dylan Casey,	July 1, 2013
79	"Heraclitus on Understanding the World"	Mark Linsenmayer, Seth Paskin, Wes Alwan, Dylan Casey, Eva Brann	July 15, 2013
80	"Heidegger on our Existential Situation"	Mark Linsenmayer, Seth Paskin, Wes Alwan, Dylan Casey,	August 8, 2013
81	"Jung on the Psyche and Dreams"	Mark Linsenmayer, Seth Paskin, Wes Alwan,	August 29, 2013
82	"Karl Popper on Science"	Mark Linsenmayer, Seth Paskin, Wes Alwan, Dylan Casey	September 24, 2013
83	"New Work with Guest Frithjof Bergmann"	Mark Linsenmayer, Seth Paskin, Wes Alwan, Dylan Casey, Frithjof Bergmann	October 10, 2013
84	"Nietzsche’s “Gay Science”"	Mark Linsenmayer, Wes Alwan, Dylan Casey	November 11, 2013
85	"Rawls on Social Justice"	Mark Linsenmayer, Wes Alwan, Dylan Casey	December 7, 2013
86	"Thomas Kuhn on Scientific Progress"	Mark Linsenmayer, Seth Paskin, Wes Alwan, Dylan Casey	December 24, 2013
87	"Sartre on Freedom and Self-Deception"	Mark Linsenmayer, Seth Paskin, Wes Alwan, Dylan Casey	January 1, 2014
88	"G.E.M. Anscombe: Should We Use Moral Language?"	Mark Linsenmayer, Wes Alwan, Dylan Casey, Philosophy Bro	February 18, 2014
89	"Berkeley: Only Ideas Exist!"	Mark Linsenmayer, Wes Alwan, Dylan Casey,	March 12, 2014
90	"Sci-Fi and Philosophy with Guest David Brin"	Mark Linsenmayer, Seth Paskin, Dylan Casey, Brian Casey, David Brin	March 26, 2014
91	"Transhumanism (Plus More on Brin)"	Mark Linsenmayer, Seth Paskin, Wes Alwan, Dylan Casey, Brian Casey,	March 29, 2014
92	"Henri Bergson on How to Do Metaphysics"	Mark Linsenmayer, Seth Paskin, Wes Alwan, Dylan Casey, Matt Teichman	April 11, 2014
93	"Freedom and Responsibility (Strawson vs. Strawson)"	Mark Linsenmayer, Seth Paskin, Wes Alwan, Tamler Sommers	May 2, 2014
94	"Schopenhauer on Reading, Writing, and Thinking"	Mark Linsenmayer, Wes Alwan, Dylan Casey	May 22, 2014
95	"Gödel on Math"	Mark Linsenmayer, Wes Alwan, Dylan Casey, Adi Habbu	June 16, 2014
96	"Oppenheimer and the Rhetoric of Science Advisers"	Mark Linsenmayer, Seth Paskin Dylan Casey, Lynda Walsh	July 1, 2014
97	"Michael Sandel on Social Justice and the Self"	Mark Linsenmayer, Seth Paskin, Wes Alwan, Dylan Casey,	July 19, 2014
98	"Guest Michael Sandel Against Market Society"	Mark Linsenmayer, Seth Paskin, Wes Alwan, Dylan Casey, Michael Sandel	July 26, 2014
99	"Looking Back on 100 Discussions and 5+ Years"	Mark Linsenmayer, Seth Paskin, Wes Alwan, Dylan Casey, Daniel Horne	August 11, 2014
100	"Plato’s Symposium Live Celebration!"	Mark Linsenmayer, Seth Paskin, Wes Alwan, Dylan Casey, Daniel Horne, Philosophy Bro	August 15, 2014
101	"Maimonides on God"	Mark Linsenmayer, Seth Paskin, Danny Lobell	September 1, 2014
102	"Emerson on Wisdom and Individuality"	Mark Linsenmayer, Wes Alwan, Dylan Casey	September 19, 2014
103	"Thoreau on Living Deliberately"	Mark Linsenmayer, Wes Alwan, Dylan Casey	October 14, 2014
104	"Robert Nozick’s Libertarianism"	Mark Linsenmayer, Seth Paskin, Wes Alwan, Dylan Casey, Stephen Metcalf	October 27, 2014
105	"Kant: What Is Beauty?"	Mark Linsenmayer, Seth Paskin, Wes Alwan, Dylan Casey,	November 15, 2014
106	"Pyrrhonian Skepticism According to Sextus Empiricus"	Mark Linsenmayer, Wes Alwan, Dylan Casey, Jessica Berry	December 4, 2014
107	"Edmund Burke on the Sublime"	Mark Linsenmayer, Seth Paskin, Dylan Casey, Amir Zaki	December 19, 2014
108	"Dangers of A.I. with Guest Nick Bostrom"	Mark Linsenmayer, Dylan Casey, Nick Bostrom, Luke Muehlhauser	January 6, 2015
109	"Jaspers’s Existentialism with Guest Paul Provenza"	Mark Linsenmayer, Seth Paskin, Wes Alwan, Dylan Casey, Paul Provenza	January 19, 2015
110	"Alfred North Whitehead: What Is Nature?"	Mark Linsenmayer, Seth Paskin, Wes Alwan, Dylan Casey	February 2, 2015
111	"Gadamer’s Hermeneutics: How to Interpret"	Mark Linsenmayer, Seth Paskin, Wes Alwan, Dylan Casey	March 2, 2015
112	"Ricoeur on Interpreting Religion"	Mark Linsenmayer, Seth Paskin, Wes Alwan, Dylan Casey, Lawrence Ware	March 16, 2015
113	"Jesus’s Parables"	Mark Linsenmayer, Wes Alwan, Lawrence Ware	April 6, 2015
114	"Schopenhauer: “The World Is Will”"	Mark Linsenmayer, Seth Paskin, Wes Alwan, Dylan Casey	April 27, 2015
115	"Schopenhauer on Music with Guest Jonathan Segel"	Mark Linsenmayer, Wes Alwan, Dylan Casey, Jonathan Segel	May 11, 2015
116	"Freud on Dreams"	Mark Linsenmayer, Seth Paskin, Wes Alwan, Dylan Casey	May 23, 2015
117	"Discussing Sophocles’s “Antigone”"	Mark Linsenmayer, Wes Alwan, Dylan Casey, John Castro	June 15, 2015
118	"The Musical Life with Guests from Camper van Beethoven"	Mark Linsenmayer, Wes Alwan, Jonathan Segel, Victor Krummenacher	June 29, 2015
119	"Nietzsche on Tragedy and the Psychology of Art"	Mark Linsenmayer, Seth Paskin, Wes Alwan, Dylan Casey, John Castro	July 6, 2015

== Bibliography ==
- Alwan, Wes; Casey, Dylan; Linsenmayer, Mark; Paskin, Seth (2024). Sunami, Christopher (ed.). The Partially Examined Life. PEL Books/Kitoba Books. ISBN 978-0-9702438-5-0.
