= 11001001 =

- Star Trek: The Next Generation episode
- The Bynars were portrayed by young actresses in extensive make-up.
- Episode no.: Season 1 Episode 15
- Directed by: Paul Lynch
- Written by: Maurice Hurley; Robert Lewin
- Cinematography by: Edward R. Brown
- Production code: 116
- Original air date: February 1, 1988

Guest appearances
- Carolyn McCormick as Minuet; Gene Dynarski as Orfil Quinteros; Katy Boyer as Zero One; Alexandra Johnson as One Zero; Iva Lane as Zero Zero; Kelli Ann McNally as One One; Jack Sheldon as Piano Player; Abdul Salaam El Razzac as Bass Player; Ron Brown as Drummer

Episode chronology
← Previous "Angel One"	Next → "Too Short a Season"
- Star Trek: The Next Generation season 1

"11001001" is the fifteenth episode of the first season of the American science fiction television series Star Trek: The Next Generation. It was first broadcast on February 1, 1988, in the United States in broadcast syndication. It was written by Maurice Hurley and Robert Lewin, and directed by Paul Lynch.

Set in the 24th century, the series follows the adventures of the Starfleet crew of the Federation starship Enterprise-D. In this episode, members of an alien race called the Bynars hijack a nearly evacuated Enterprise while retrofitting the computer in space dock.

Make-up supervisor Michael Westmore created the look of the Bynars, who were four women in extensive make-up. The musical score was scored by Ron Jones. Reviewers praised the Bynars themselves, and the response to the episode was generally positive, with one critic calling it the best of the season. It was awarded an Emmy Award for Outstanding Sound Editing for a Series.

== Plot ==
The Federation starship Enterprise arrives at Starbase 74 for a routine maintenance check. Captain Jean-Luc Picard (Patrick Stewart) and Commander William Riker (Jonathan Frakes) greet Starbase Commander Quinteros (Gene Dynarski) and two pairs of small humanoid aliens known as Bynars; the Bynars heavily rely on their computer technology and work in pairs for best efficiency. Much of the crew take shore leave while Picard, Riker and a skeleton crew remain aboard. Riker is intrigued by the Bynars' claimed upgrades to the holodeck and starts a program in a jazz bar. The program includes a woman named Minuet (Carolyn McCormick), by whom Riker is fascinated, both as a beautiful and charming woman, but also by the level of sophistication in her responses. Riker shortly returns, and Picard walks in on him kissing Minuet, and he too is amazed by the simulation.

Meanwhile, the Bynars discreetly create a catastrophic failure in the ship's warp core. Lt. Cmdr. Data (Brent Spiner) and Geordi La Forge (LeVar Burton) are unable to locate Picard or Riker and, assuming them to already be on the Starbase, order an emergency evacuation. They set the ship to leave the Starbase and warp to a safe location before it would explode. However, once they are clear of the dock, the failure disappears and the ship sets course for the Bynar system, the planet Bynaus orbiting Beta Magellan. Data, La Forge, and Quinteros realize that the Bynars are still aboard the ship, but there are currently no other working vessels to follow them. Back on the Enterprise, Riker and Picard leave the simulation to find the ship empty and at warp to the Bynar system, with the ship's controls locked to the bridge. Fearing that the Bynars have taken over the ship for nefarious purposes, they set the ship to self-destruct in 5 minutes and then take the bridge by site-to-site transport and find the Bynars there unconscious.

After canceling the self-destruct, they find the Bynars have uploaded massive amounts of information to the Enterprise computers, but they are unable to decode it. Realizing that Minuet was purposely created by the Bynars as a distraction, Picard and Riker ask the simulation about what is going on as the ship nears the orbit of Bynaus. Minuet explains that a star near the Bynar homeworld had gone supernova and the EMP it emitted would knock out their computer systems, killing the Bynars. They had used the Enterprise to upload their computer information for safekeeping and then planned to download it back to the Bynar computers after the threat of the EMP had passed. With Data's help, Picard and Riker download the data, and the Bynars recover. They apologize for their actions, having feared that Starfleet would refuse to help, though Picard notes they only had to ask. As the Enterprise returns to Starbase, Riker returns to the holodeck to thank Minuet but finds that without the Bynar data, the simulation has regressed to the expected norm for the holodeck, and while Minuet still exists, she is not the same as before. Riker reports to Picard that Minuet is gone.

== Production ==
The name "11001001" is a binary number (201 in decimal), a concatenation of the names of the Bynars (One One, Zero Zero, One Zero, and Zero One). The episode at one point was called "10101001". It was originally intended that this episode would take place prior to "The Big Goodbye", with the Bynars' modifications causing the problems with the holodeck seen in that episode. Instead it was changed to the Bynars aiming to fix the holodeck to prevent those problems from recurring. The Bynars themselves were played by young women. Children were considered for the parts, but the production team thought that it would be too troublesome because of the limited time they could work each day and the need to hire teachers. Each actress was required to wear extensive make-up, which was created by make-up supervisor Michael Westmore. A large single-piece bald cap was made from the same mold for each actress, which required some customised trimming to get it to fit properly. To cover up problems with the seams of the cap, some fake hair was added on the Bynars' necks. Each actress also controlled the flashing light inside the apparatus on the side of the headpiece through a battery pack attached to the waistband of their costumes. To disguise their voices, the pitch was lowered in post production. It was originally planned to add subtitles over the Bynars' conversations between themselves.

The image of the Starbase orbiting a planet was re-used from Star Trek III: The Search for Spock. The score was created by Ron Jones, who incorporated jazz themes composed by John Beasley. The episode was written by Maurice Hurley and Robert Lewin. Hurley was pleased with the outcome of the episode, praising the work of Westmore on the Bynars' makeup and the performance of Jonathan Frakes. Frakes enjoyed the episode, too, saying, "A fabulous show. Those were the kind of chances we took first season that when they worked, they worked great. It was a very chancy show and I loved it." Director Paul Lynch also thought that the Bynars were "great". Carolyn McCormick appeared as Minuet and subsequently became a regular cast member in Law and Order. She returned to the role of Minuet in the season four episode "Future Imperfect". Gene Dynarski had previously appeared as Ben Childress in Star Trek: The Original Series episode "Mudd's Women" and Krodak in "The Mark of Gideon".

== Reception ==
"11001001" aired in broadcast syndication during the week commencing February 7, 1988. It received Nielsen ratings of 10.7, reflecting the percentage of all households watching the episode during its timeslot. These ratings were lower than both the episodes broadcast both before and afterwards. For their work in this episode, Bill Wistrom, Wilson Dyer, Mace Matiosian, James Wolvington, Gerry Sackman and Keith Bilderbeck were awarded an Emmy Award for Outstanding Sound Editing for a Series. TV Guide ranked it No. 6 on its list of the top 10 Star Trek episodes for the magazine's celebration of the franchise's 30th anniversary in 1996.

Several reviewers re-watched the episode after the end of the series. James Hunt reviewed the episode for the website "Den of Geek" in January 2013. He was surprised by the episode as he "went in expecting something that was typically season one awful, and got something that was actually a lot of fun". He thought that the theme of symbiosis between man and machine was "interesting", stating it was the best episode up until that point in season one and one of the best of the season overall. Zack Handlen watched the episode for The A.V. Club in May 2010. He too was surprised by what he found. Handlen said that "last time I saw it, I thought Riker and Minuet's interactions were cheesy as hell. They didn't bother me so much now, because they don't go on very long, and there's something hilarious about a man trying to seduce a computer simulation designed to respond to his seductions". But he said, "I had fun with this, which I wasn't expecting", and "thought this was solid". He gave the episode a B grade.

Keith DeCandido reviewed the episode for Tor.com in June 2011. He described it as "one of the strongest first-season episodes", and the Bynars as "one of the finest alien species Trek has provided". He also thought that turning off the auto-destruct with two minutes to go instead of mere seconds neatly avoided a cliché, and gave it a score of seven out of ten. Michelle Erica Green for TrekNation watched the episode in June 2007. She thought that it came "very close to being a really good episode". She also thought that Picard and Riker's actions were the "most boneheaded joint behavior by the top two officers", in that they got distracted by a female character on the holodeck and didn't notice the ship being evacuated. Jamahl Epsicokhan at his website "Jammer's Reviews" described "11001001" as "easily season one's best and most memorable episode". He thought that it was the "season's most solid sci-fi concept" and that the series was "firing on all cylinders, with everything coming together, from plot to character, to sensible use of technology and action". He gave it a score of four out of four.

In 2011, this episode was noted by Forbes as one that explores the implications of advanced technology, especially the connection between people and technology. They compare this to the later episode "The Nth Degree". Also of note, they point out the modifications to the Enterprise-D holodeck, allows it to pass an impromptu turing test by the character Commander Riker. In 2012, Wired magazine said this was one of the best episodes of Star Trek: The Next Generation. In 2020, Screen Rant ranked Minuet, the holographic lady featured in the show, as the seventh best holodeck character of the Star Trek franchise.

== Home media release ==
The first home media release of "11001001" was on VHS cassette, appearing on August 26, 1992, in the United States and Canada. The episode was later included on the Star Trek: The Next Generation season one DVD box set, released in March 2002, and then released as part of the season one Blu-ray set on July 24, 2012.
