= Silver John =

Fictional character

Silver John is a fictional character from a series of fantasy stories (1963–84) by American author Manly Wade Wellman (1903–1986). Though fans refer to him as Silver John or as John the Balladeer, the stories simply call him John. He is an example of the loner hero. The stories are set in the Appalachian mountains of North Carolina. The historical period is never explicitly indicated, but appears to be mid 20th century.

== John ==
John, whose last name is never revealed, is a wandering singer who carries a guitar strung with strings of pure silver. He is a veteran of the Korean War and served in the U.S. Army as a sharpshooter (in the novel After Dark, he mentions that his highest rank was PFC). In his travels, he frequently encounters creatures and superstitions from the folk tales and superstitions of the mountain people. Though John has no formal education, he is self-taught, highly intelligent and widely read; it is implied that his knowledge of occult and folk legendarium is of PhD level (in the novel The Hanging Stones, he receives word that Flornoy College is awarding him an honorary doctorate for contributions to folklore and folk music). This knowledge has granted him competent use of white magic, which he has used on occasion to overcome enemies or obstacles, but it is primarily his courage, wit, and essential goodness that always enable him to triumph over supernatural evils (although the silver strings of his guitar and his possession of a copy of The Long Lost Friend are also powerful tools in fighting evil magic), while basic Army training allows him to physically deal with human foes. He has an implied mystical link of some sort to John the Baptist, and much of his personal philosophy can be traced to a "primitive" Gospel-based Christianity. On one occasion, he is "employed" by the State Department to investigate on their behalf a possible instance of Satanism (see the novel The Lost and Lurking for full details).

In the short story "Nine Yards of Other Cloth", John rescues a girl named Evadare from the unwanted attentions of the evil Shull Cobart: "Small-made, yet you saw she was grown and you saw she was proud ... Her bright sun-colored hair was tied behind her neck with a blue ribbon ... I saw by the glow how pinky-soft her skin was, how young and pretty, and bigger, bluer eyes than Evadare's you couldn't call for."

After Shull Cobart is destroyed, Evadare asks to join John on his travels, but he refuses to make her a wanderer like himself; when he can't dissuade her, he flees from her but she follows him. When after following without complaint she reaches the end of her strength and endurance, he realizes that he loves her. In the following story "Trill Coster's Burden", after Evadare shows her faith and courage by taking a dead wicked woman's sins upon herself according to mountain custom (called "sin-eating": "Somebody dies after a bad life, and a friend or paid person agrees the sins will be his, not the dead one's") and watching out the night, she and John are married by Preacher Frank Ricks. Evadare is mentioned in the subsequent "Silver John" novels, but only actually appears in the novel The Hanging Stones.

The stories are rich in the customs and lore of the region and many of the folk songs John sings are authentic as well. Wellman did introduce some original songs and legends but his creations blend seamlessly with the traditional material. Whereas Tolkien integrated Northern mythology into his mythos, and C.S. Lewis the European Fairy Tales of yore, Wellman's stories are drenched in the folktales and songs of old Americana; the haunting stories of the slaves and the tall tales of the Revolution, strange beasts, witch-women, and dark apparitions. Wellman's friend, the author Karl Edward Wagner, wrote: "These stories are chilling and enchanting, magical and down-to-earth, full of wonder and humanity. They are fun. They are like nothing else you’ve read before."

The short stories of John have been collected four times, as Who Fears the Devil? (1963), John the Balladeer (1988), Owls Hoot in Daytime and Other Omens (2003), and Who Fears the Devil? (2010). In addition, there are five novels about John. Wellman was planning an additional novel, to be titled The Valley So Low, but died before writing it. The title would be used for a collection of his stories, instead.

== The Silver John stories ==
- "O Ugly Bird"
- "The Desrick on Yandro"
- "Vandy, Vandy"
- "One Other"
- "Call Me From the Valley"
- "The Little Black Train"
- "Shiver in the Pines"
- "Walk Like A Mountain"
- "On the Hills and Everywhere"
- "Old Devlins Was A-Waitin'"
- "Nine Yards of Other Cloth"
- "Trill Coster's Burden"
- "The Spring"
- "Owls Hoot in the Daytime"
- "Can These Bones Live?"
- "Nobody Ever Goes There"
- "Where Did She Wander?"

There is also a group of mini-stories or vignettes, consisting of about half a page, that were originally used as transitions from one major story to another in the collection Who Fears the Devil. These were later collected and made into two chapters in the later collections: "Wonder As I Wander" and "Further Down the Trail":

- "John's My Name"
- "Why They're Named That"
- "None Wiser For The Trip"
- "Nary Spell"
- "Then I Wasn't Alone"
- "You Know The Tale of Hoph"
- "Blue Monkey"
- "The Stars Down There"
- "Find The Place Yourself"
- "I Can't Claim That"
- "Who Else Could I Count On?"

The Silver John stories and vignettes are available in audio-book format through Audible in the collection Owls Hoot in the Daytime and Other Omens read by Brian Troxell.

== The Silver John novels ==
- The Old Gods Waken (1979)
- After Dark (1980)
- The Lost and Lurking (1981)
- The Hanging Stones (1982)
- Voice of the Mountain (1984)

The novel The Old Gods Waken is available in audio-book format from Blackstone Audio read by Stefan Rudnicki on CD and via download through Audible.

== In popular culture ==
- The Legend of Hillbilly John, a low-budget movie about John, was released in 1974, with Hedge Capers (of the singing group Hedge and Donna) as John, Denver Pyle, Severn Darden, Val Avery and Susan Strasberg. The film's plot incorporates two of the John stories: "The Desrick on Yandro" and "O Ugly Bird".
- The novel Old Nathan by David Drake, a friend of Wellman's, was inspired by the "Silver John" stories.
- Hellboy creator Mike Mignola makes a deliberate homage to John in his story The Crooked Man.
- Author Brian Keene includes an explicit description of John and his adventures in his horror novel Dark Hollow.
- Ex-Amish occult detective Levi Stolzfus (also from Brian Keene's writings), is closely tied to John's character, including use of much of the same magic used by John in the Silver John novels.
- British psych-folk band This Is the Kit released a song in 2015 entitled Silver John, which references "the apocalypse" in its lyrics.
- The New Age group Out of Orion (also called "Ox3" or "O times 3") released four CDs of music based on the John stories, including Just Call Me John (2012), and the compilation The Tales of John the Balladeer (2013).
