= Stephen Yafa =

American screenwriter, author

- Born: 1941 (age 84–85); United States
- Education: Dartmouth College, Carnegie-Mellon University
- Occupations: Screenwriter, journalist
- Spouse: Bonnie Dahan
- Children: 3
- Writing career
- Language: English
- Website: stephenyafa.net

Stephen Yafa is an American screenwriter, author, and speaker. He was noted for his 1968 screenplay, Paxton Quigley's Had the Course, which was also a Writers Guild of America award-winning novel. The film was renamed Three in the Attic. Reviews were not good, and Variety noted that Yafa disowned the picture. Yafa co-wrote the screenplay for the 1971 film, Summertree, with Edward Hume, based on the successful Ron Cowen play.

Yafa is also known for his first non-fiction book, Big Cotton, published by Viking in 2005, and republished as Cotton: The Biography of a Revolutionary Fiber by Penguin in 2006. He was interviewed about the book on Illinois Public Radio. His most recent book is Grain of Truth: Why Eating Wheat Can Improve Your Health.

== Education ==
Yafa is a graduate of Dartmouth College, with an MFA from Carnegie-Mellon.

== Career and reception ==
Other writing by Yafa includes articles on wine, a book chapter on wine's origin, and an article on child trafficking. Yafa's Big Cotton was named a Best Book of the Year by the San Francisco Chronicle: "Yafa chronicles everything from the domestication of cotton 5,550 years ago in Asia, Africa and South America to the rise of denim, the most American of fabrics, and today's controversial bioengineering."

In 2005, calling his label “Segue” to reflect a transition from wine lover and writer to commercial winemaker, Yafa began making Pinot Noir wine professionally on a small scale. He produced 50 cases in 2005. In 2007 he produced 150 cases, which were rated "Decent" by Prince of Pinot in 2009. In 2007, Wines & Vines magazine published a 3-part series Yafa wrote about his experiences, called "Going Pro."

In From No-knead to Sourdough Victoria Miller called Grain of Truth one of the best books on Gluten.

== Personal life ==
Yafa is married to Bonnie Dahan, with three grown children, and lives in Marin County, California. Yafa was motivated to investigate and write about wheat and gluten after his wife was diagnosed with a "gluten neck," and he now promotes slow-fermented or homemade bread.

== See also ==
- Three in the Attic Based on novel "Paxton Quigley's Had the Course" by Stephen Yafa
- Summertree Screenplay by Edward Hume and Stephen Yafa
- Max Frost and the Troopers single, "Sittin' in Circles," was performed in the film Three in the Attic by Davie Allan and the Arrows. The B-side of that single, "Paxton Quigley's Had The Course," was a Chad & Jeremy composition.
- Once Upon a Time in Hollywood - Track_listing Track 6 - "Paxton Quigley's Had the Course" – Chad & Jeremy
- Cotton
- Cotton production in the United States
- Founding Fathers of the United States
- History of agriculture in the United States
