= Denberg =

Denberg is a surname. Notable people with the surname include:

- Lori Beth Denberg (born 1976), American actress and comedian
- Susan Denberg (born 1944), German-Austrian model and actress
