= Well I Never =

Well I Never may refer to:

- A song on Flesh & Blood (Whitesnake album)
- A B-side single by Hedge and Donna
- A regional name for the drinking game "Never have I ever"
