= The Legend of Hillbilly John =

1972 film directed by John Newland

- Directed by: John Newland
- Written by: Melvin P. Levy
- Based on: Who Fears the Devil? by Manly Wade Wellman
- Produced by: Barney Rosenzweig
- Starring: Hedges Capers; Severn Darden; Sharon Henesy; Denver Pyle; Susan Strasberg; Harris Yulin; Sidney Clute; Percy Rodriguez
- Cinematography: Flemming Olsen
- Edited by: Russell Schoengarth; Barton Hayes
- Music by: Roger Kellaway
- Distributed by: Jack H. Harris Enterprises Inc.
- Release date: July 1972
- Running time: 89 minutes
- Language: English

The Legend of Hillbilly John (originally titled Who Fears the Devil?) is a 1972 American fantasy film based on the short story collection Who Fears the Devil? by Manly Wade Wellman.

== Plot ==
John (Hedges Capers), is an easygoing singer whose Grandpappy John (Denver Pyle) loses a fiery musical duel with the devil. Thereafter, John carries a magical silver-stringed guitar from one Appalachian community to the next, accompanied by a dog he calls “Honor Hound.” In one very long sequence, John escorts a dangerous man called Zebulon Yandro (Harris Yulin) to a meeting with Yandro’s ultimate fate. And in the most dynamic sequence, John duels with “Ugly Bird” atop Hark Mountain. Somewhat holding the pieces of the story together is Mr. Marduke (Severn Darden), a host/narrator who lists among the enemies plaguing the Appalachian Mountains the devil and the U.S. Army Corps of Engineers.

== Cast ==
- Hedges Capers as John
- Severn Darden as Mr. Marduke
- Sharon Henesy as Lily
- Denver Pyle as Grandpappy John
- Susan Strasberg as Polly Wiltse
- Harris Yulin as Zebulon Yandro
- Sidney Clute as Charles
- R.G. Armstrong as Bristowe
- Percy Rodriguez as Capt. Lojoie H. Desplain IV
- Val Avery as Shull Cobart

== Production ==
The Legend of Hillbilly John was the only theatrically released feature film produced by Barney Rosenzweig, best known for the long-running police drama Cagney & Lacey. It is the last feature film directed by John Newland, who is better known as the host of the paranormal anthology series Alcoa Presents One Step Beyond. The film was adapted by Melvin P. Levy from the short story collection Who Fears the Devil? by Manly Wade Wellman. Critic Darrell Schweitzer asserts that “Wellman despised the film.” Critic Karl Edward Wagner quoted Wellman as saying, “It’s like ancient Rome and modern Rome. Here and there some of the ruins of the original poke through.”
