= Nine Yards of Other Cloth =

1958 short story by Manly Wade Wellman

- Short story by Manly Wade Wellman
- Country: United States
- Language: English
- Genre(s): Fantasy

Publication
- Published in: The Magazine of Fantasy & Science Fiction
- Publication type: Periodical
- Publisher: Mercury Publications
- Media type: Magazine
- Publication date: November 1958
- Series: John the Balladeer

"Nine Yards of Other Cloth" is a fantasy short story by American writer Manly Wade Wellman. Originally published in the November 1958 issue of The Magazine of Fantasy and Science Fiction, it was nominated for, but did not win, the 1959 Hugo Award for Best Short Story.

The story is one of many that Wellman wrote in his "John the Balladeer" series (also known as the "Silver John" series).

== Plot summary ==
The story is set in North Carolina. When it begins, the reader finds John on a wooded hill, trying to outdistance an approaching person.

The story line then flashes back to earlier events. The reader learns that John has met Shull Cobart, an unlikable man who is unusually proficient at playing the fiddle. Afterwards, John finds himself walking through the woods to Hosea Hollow, a place considered by the local populace to be haunted. He comes upon a cabin that is the home of Evadare, a single woman who had worked for Cobart but who ran off to live in the hollow after rejecting Cobart's romantic advances. The same day that John and Evadare meet, they are visited at the cabin by Cobart. In order to have Evadare to himself, Cobart reveals the supernatural power of his fiddle and uses that power to force John to join him outside to meet Kalu, the demon that actually does haunt the hollow. Unbeknownst to Cobart, but figured out by John, Kalu has redeemed itself and is now a force for good. Kalu kills Cobart, thus releasing John from the fiddle's spell.

Afterwards, Evadare asks John to live with her in the cabin. But John does not want to give up his wandering ways and runs off. It is Evadare who was the person chasing after John at the beginning of the story.

The story's title is a reference to the amount of cloth that would typically be used for a burial shroud.

== Publication history ==
In the United States, "Nine Yards of Other Cloth" first appeared in the November 1958 issue of The Magazine of Fantasy and Science Fiction. It first appeared in Britain in the May 1964 issue of Venture Science Fiction.

The novelette has been anthologized twice—once in English and once in German. The English-language anthology is Treasury of Modern Fantasy Avon Books, 1981 and in slightly abridged form as Masters of Fantasy from Galahad Books, 1992). The German-language anthology is Traumreich der Magie ("Rich Dreams of Magic", Heyne Verlag, 1985). The story has appeared in four collections of Wellman's work, two of which are devoted to works about John the Balladeer. These two are Who Fears the Devil? (Arkham House, 1963 followed by Ballantine Books, 1964) and John the Balladeer (Baen Books, 1988).

The foregoing was taken from the story's listing in the Internet Speculative Fiction Database (for which see the External Links section below). More detail on its publication history can be found at that listing.
