= Three in the Attic =

1968 film by Richard Wilson

- Theatrical release poster
- Directed by: Richard Wilson
- Written by: Stephen Yafa
- Based on: novel Paxton Quigley's Had the Course by Stephen Yafa
- Produced by: Richard Wilson; executives; Samuel Z. Arkoff; James H. Nicholson; associate; Norman T. Herman
- Starring: Christopher Jones; Yvette Mimieux; Judy Pace; Maggie Thrett; Eve McVeagh
- Cinematography: J. Burgi Contner
- Edited by: Richard C. Meyer; Eve Newman
- Music by: Chad & Jeremy; Davie Allan and the Arrows
- Production companies: Hermes Productions; American International Pictures
- Distributed by: American International Pictures
- Release date: December 20, 1968
- Running time: 92 minutes
- Country: United States
- Language: English
- Box office: $6 million (US/Canada rentals)

Three in the Attic (stylized as 3 in the Attic) is a 1968 American comedy-drama film directed by Richard Wilson and starring Christopher Jones and Yvette Mimieux, with Judy Pace and Maggie Thrett. Nan Martin, John Beck, and Eve McVeagh appear in supporting roles. Jones plays Paxton Quigley, a lothario who swears his fidelity to all three of the women he is dating, each of whom is unaware of his deception. When they learn the truth about Paxton, the women lure him into a college dormitory attic, where they each take turns attacking Paxton sexually in order to punish him.

== Plot ==
Paxton Quigley (Christopher Jones), a renowned womanizer, is a student at the fictional Willard College for Men, located a mile away from the fictional Fulton College for Women. The schools are located in small college communities in the middle of Vermont.

After meeting at a Zeta Chi (ZX) fraternity party, Paxton and a Fulton undergrad, Tobey Clinton (Yvette Mimieux), begin dating. They then take their relationship to the next level by spending the summer together by the beach in Provincetown.

Paxton and Tobey are then caught living together by Tobey's parents at their family house in Provincetown. Following a fight between Tobey and her mother, the two separate for the last two weeks of summer break. Tobey, by now deeply in love, is ecstatic to be with Paxton upon their return to school.

While out on his motorcycle, Paxton has a chance encounter with a young artist in need of a ride; their meeting is quite sexually charged. The young artist, Eulice (Judy Pace), another Fulton student, entreats Paxton to let her paint him naked. When she is finished, Paxton learns that she only wanted to paint his face, but got him naked for fun. She promises to get nude for Paxton as compensation. After a meal, they retire to a motel that Paxton frequents with his many different conquests. Following his initial escapade with Eulice, Paxton brags to his fraternity brothers that he feels no remorse.

While they are on a trip to a cabin, Tobey asks Paxton to move out of his fraternity house and move into an apartment with her. Paxton overreacts; Tobey explains that her father bet her that if she rented an apartment for the two of them Paxton would get cold feet and end the relationship. A bitter fight ensues, but they soon make up.

Paxton receives a phone call from Eulice at his fraternity house, and is goaded into seeing her again. While racing over to Eulice's residence Paxton trips and happens upon Jan (Maggie Thrett), a young hippie who is making a flower-collage in the woods. They strike up a conversation, and soon after, Paxton takes Jan to his favorite motel. The two eat some of Jan's "magic-brownies" and then Jan uses body paint to cover Paxton's back in flowers. As soon as Paxton makes a move, Jan runs for the door. Paxton aggressively attacks her, and then stops and feigns to be homosexual who was abused by a junior high school coach. This exploitative trickery wins her sympathy and they soon become intimate.

Again, Paxton brags about his exploits back at his fraternity house. One of his brothers gives him the idea of dating all three young women at the same time. They scheme over some beers, and come up with an elaborate plan for Paxton to trick all three women into thinking he is seeing each one exclusively.

While at a movie which Paxton is watching with Tobey, he is almost discovered by both Eulice and Jan, who spot him from the front; he barely escapes detection.

Paxton returns to the Zeta Chi house and walks into a party where brothers are taking advantage of a drunken female student. Paxton, hit with a sudden sense of guilt, tries to protect her from the brothers' jeers.

Paxton, filled with his new-found conscience, rents an apartment for himself and Tobey and goes to her dorm building to surprise her with his new level of commitment. Tobey, obviously very distraught, tells Paxton to follow her into her attic, where she reveals that Eulice, Jan, and she have discovered Paxton's secret infidelity. Tobey caught him after seeing Eulice's painting of Paxton at an art show and tracking down the artist. The three then lock Paxton in the attic and plan to continue sleeping with him constantly to physically wear him out as a punishment. Paxton rebels by going on a hunger strike.

After noticing his drop in class attendance, the dean of Willard College sends out a description of Paxton to neighboring colleges, labeling him as a missing student.

A nosy dorm mate of Tobey's notices the actions of Paxton's captors and reports them to the assistant dean of Fulton. Meanwhile, Paxton is being worn to physical extremes from a combination of nearly two weeks of malnutrition and being unable to resist the relentless advances of Tobey, Eulice, and Jan. The assistant dean of Fulton, Dean Nazarin (Nan Martin), connects information listed in a missing person's report and information from a nosy student. She then concludes that Paxton is being held in the attic of Fulton's Ford Hall, Tobey's residence. Tobey meets with Dean Nazarin and explains the situation. Although unable to officially condone the actions of the young women, the dean offers a chance for Tobey to carry out Paxton's "punishment" while turning a blind eye.

Meanwhile, Paxton has vivid hallucinations where he accuses his three captors and fantasizes that they are unanimously hated by all of Fulton College while he is shown love and comfort. Failing to make Paxton explain his actions, Tobey finally consents to release him from the attic, and disoriented, he stumbles into an unsuspecting female dorm. He is attacked by the female residents as an intruder and knocked unconscious. An ambulance soon takes him away. Due to intervention from Dean Nazarin, the three women get out of the scandal without punishment.

With the help of Eulice, Paxton is then able to chase down Tobey before she leaves town on a bus, and reconciles with her after a desperate display of love.

== Cast ==
- Christopher Jones as Paxton Quigley
- Yvette Mimieux as Tobey Clinton
- Judy Pace as Eulice
- Maggie Thrett as Jan
- Nan Martin as Dean Nazarin
- John Beck as Jake
- Eve McVeagh as Mrs. Clinton
- Reva Rose as Selma
- Richard Derr as Mr. Clinton
- Honey Alden as Flo
- Tom Ahearne as Wilfred

== Production ==
Advertisement for book Chicago Tribune 4 Feb 1968

=== Development ===
The film began as a screenplay by Stephen Yafa called Paxton Quigley's Had the Course which won a Writers Guild of America award for best student script in 1964. Yafa was then 23 years old and studying a Masters in Playwriting at Carnegie Tech. Yafa said he wrote it "out of venomous contempt for all the claptrap I'd ever seen that presumed to examine the sex life of young Americans and only succeeded in vilifying our lower regions." Yafa went out to Hollywood, and worked on a project for producer Harold Hecht that was never made. He turned it into a novel which was published in late 1967.

In November 1967 AIP announced they had purchased the script and Richard Wilson would direct.

=== Filming ===
Filming started in February 1968 by which time the title had changed to Three in the Attic. It was the film debut of John Beck. Much of Three in the Attic was filmed at the University of North Carolina in Chapel Hill, North Carolina. The campus scenes depict Carolina's Polk Place, Kenan Dorm, and the administrative South Building in particular.

The location for the Zeta Chi house is actually the Alpha Delta chapter house of Alpha Tau Omega, located at 303 East Franklin Street in Chapel Hill. Scenes are shot in front of the house, in its Great Hall, and in the house's basement, also known as the "Cave".

An additional scene was also filmed in the attic of the Graham House at 115 Battle Lane, a few blocks from the Alpha Delta house.

A night time scene was filmed at an old motor court on Old Chapel Hill Rd.

The title sequence was designed by Sandy Dvore.

== Music ==
British duo Chad & Jeremy recorded original songs and instrumental backing music for the film. The soundtrack album contains the duo's own version of "Paxton's Song (Smoke)", which Jones sang in the film. The album was released in the U.S. on Sidewalk Records in 1969, with a CD reissue by Curb Records in 2013.

== Response ==
=== Critical ===
Three in the Attic was released to mixed reviews. In the Chicago Sun-Times, Roger Ebert gave the film two stars, claiming the film was unable to live up to its promising concept. Ebert did single out Judy Pace's Eulice as one of the film's few highlights.

Variety gave the movie a very poor review, noting that even writer Stephen Yafa disowned the picture. Their review claims the film was harmed by amateurish acting, "littered with padding optical effects, hampered by uneven dramatic concept, and redundant in its too-delicious sex teasing."

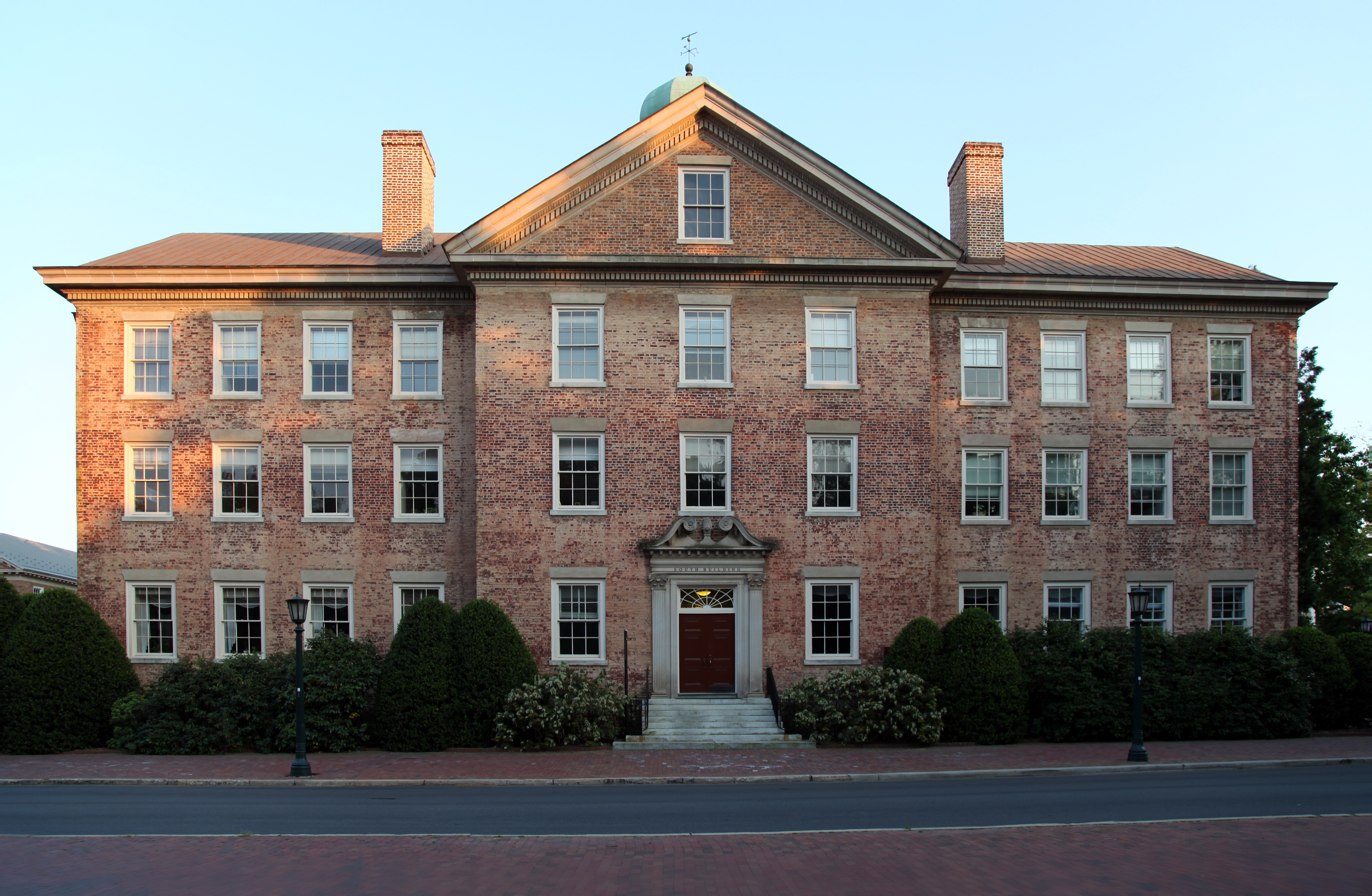
The South Building as seen from Cameron Avenue in Chapel Hill, North Carolina.

Vincent Canby of The New York Times called the film:

More raunchy and less funny than any other AIP film I've seen. It's a fantasizing projection of dearly held contemporary myths about romance, sex, humour, ethics, aesthetics, art and movies. In its eclectic way, it's also in bad taste on an almost staggering number of levels. Wit: "non-swimmers shouldn't jump bare ---- into the sea of love." Incidental decor: a jock strap hanging permanently over a screen in Paxton's pad. Style: a mixed up anthology of jump cuts, Resnais-like memory cuts, blown- up still photographs all backed up by neo-Simon and Garfunkel. Preliminary box office statistics indicate that its going to be a smash hit.

=== Box office ===
The film was AIP's highest-grossing film of the decade. It was the 18th most popular movie at the US box office in 1969.

It led to a less successful follow-up originally known as The Late Boy Wonder but then called Up in the Cellar (1970).

Due to the film's success, Wilson then signed a seven-picture deal with Universal. Jones was announced for another AIP film called We Outnumber You but the film was never made.

In 1974 Samuel Z. Arkoff said the film was AIP's highest grossing to that point. He put this down to "the theme of the picture" saying Jones "should have been a big star but got sidetracked by some... nervous problems."

== Legacy ==
In 2019, the film is referenced twice in Quentin Tarantino's film Once Upon a Time in Hollywood, first in a tv ad during an episode of Mannix in Cliff Booth's trailer, second on a movie theater marquee later in the film.

== See also ==
- List of American films of 1968
