= Disorder (1962 film) =

- Directed by: Franco Brusati
- Produced by: Titanus Films
- Cinematography: Leonida Barboni
- Edited by: Ruggero Mastroianni
- Music by: Mario Nascimbene
- Release date: 16 March 1962 (Italy)
- Countries: Italy; France

Disorder (Italian: Il disordine, French: Le Désordre) is a 1962 Italian-French comedy-drama film directed by Franco Brusati.

The story is a series of vignettes, in which a poor, uneducated young man (Renato Salvatori) tries to earn enough money to take his mother out of a nursing home and find a place where they both might live.

For his performance, Georges Wilson won the Golden Gate Award for Best Supporting Actor at the San Francisco International Film Festival.

== Cast ==
- Louis Jourdan : Tom
- Susan Strasberg : Isabella
- Curd Jürgens : the father
- Alida Valli : the mother
- Renato Salvatori : Mario
- Georges Wilson : Don Giuseppe
- Sami Frey : Carlo
- Jean Sorel : Andrea
- Antonella Lualdi : Mali
- Tomas Milian : Bruno
- Adriana Asti

== Reception ==
Film critic John Simon wrote that Disorder "left him cold".
