= Thunder and Lightning (1977 film) =

1977 film by Corey Allen

- Theatrical release poster
- Directed by: Corey Allen
- Written by: William Hjortsberg
- Produced by: Roger Corman
- Starring: Kate Jackson; David Carradine; Sterling Holloway; Roger C. Carmel; Eddie Barth; Charles Napier
- Cinematography: James Pergola
- Edited by: Anthony Redman
- Music by: Andy Stein
- Production company: 20th Century Fox
- Distributed by: 20th Century Fox
- Release date: August 24, 1977
- Country: United States
- Language: English
- Box office: $6 million (domestic)

Thunder and Lightning is a 1977 action comedy film directed by Corey Allen, and starring David Carradine and Kate Jackson.

== Plot ==
The plot involves moonshine runners in Florida who are trying to stay independent in the face of attempts by organized crime to take over their business.

== Cast ==
=== Main ===
- David Carradine as Harley Thomas
- Kate Jackson as Nancy Sue Hunnicutt
- Sterling Holloway as Hobe Carpenter
- Patrick Cranshaw as Taylor
- Charles Napier as Jim Bob
- George Murdock as Jake Summers
- Ron Feinberg as Bubba

=== Supporting ===
- Roger C. Carmel as Ralph Junior Hunnicutt
- Hope Pomerance as Mrs. Hunnicutt
- Eddie Barth as Rudi Volpone (credited as Ed Barth)
- Malcolm Jones as Rainey
- Charles Willeford as Bartender
- Christopher Raynolds as Scooter
- Claude Earl Jones as Carl (credited as Claude Jones)
- Emilio Rivera as Honeydew Driver

=== Cameo appearance/uncredited ===
- Richard Holden as Race Announcer

== Production ==
At one stage the film was reportedly going to star Susan George and Roger Corman met with Jimmy Connors about playing the male lead. Carradine signed in March 1976. Kate Jackson was known for The Rookies and made the film while on hiatus from that series. She had also just made the pilot for Charlie's Angels.

The script was originally set in Georgia but was relocated to the Florida Everglades in order to take advantage of the beauty of that area.

It was Sterling Holloway's final film role.

Charles Willeford worked as location manager.

It was Roger Corman's last of four films produced for 20th Century Fox (the others were Fighting Mad, Capone and Moving Violation).

Lewis Teague did second unit.

== Reception ==
The film was popular and Corey Allen worked for Corman again on Avalanche (1978).
