= Eugene Dynarski =

American actor (1933–2020)

- Eugene Dynarski in Star Trek The Next Generation in 1987
- Born: September 13, 1933; Brooklyn, New York, U.S.
- Died: February 27, 2020 (aged 86); Studio City, California, U.S.
- Other name: Gene Dynarski
- Occupation: Actor
- Years active: 1965–2020

Eugene Dynarski (September 13, 1933 – February 27, 2020) was an American actor. Three of the most popular projects that he has been involved with were two Steven Spielberg films, Duel and Close Encounters of the Third Kind, and the Westwood Studios computer game Command & Conquer: Red Alert.

== Acting career ==
Dynarski attended Harbor College in San Pedro, Los Angeles, where he majored in theater arts.

Dynarski acted on stage before he began working in films and on television.

In 1971's Duel, Dynarski had a small role as a truck driver in a cafe that was mistakenly identified by car driver David Mann (Dennis Weaver) as his tormenting truck driver that resulted in a short-lived fight at Chuck's Cafe. In Command & Conquer: Red Alert, Dynarski plays a major supporting role as Soviet Premier Joseph Stalin, appearing throughout much of the game's Soviet campaign and, to a lesser extent, the Allied campaign. In the 1974 film Earthquake, Dynarski portrays Fred, a worker at the Mulholland Dam who becomes the first fatality of the disaster.

Dynarski also appeared in numerous television shows. He was one of 32 actors or actresses to have guest-starred in both the original Star Trek television series (episodes "Mudd's Women" and "The Mark of Gideon") and in one of the series' spin offs (Star Trek: The Next Generation's "11001001"). In Monkees TV series, Dynarski played the Dragonman's sidekick, Toto, in the episode titled "Monkee Chow Mein" (original US air date: March 13, 1967). His many other TV credits include episodes of Batman (episodes 47 and 48), Starsky & Hutch, CHiPs, Little House on the Prairie and The A-Team.

Dynarski is also known for his two appearances as Izzy Mandelbaum Jr. on Seinfeld and as Helmut Jitters in the short film Apple Jack.

His final role was in The X-Files episode "Patience" as Ernie Stefaniuk.

Dynarski and David Weitz, a friend, built the Gene Dynarski Theater, which opened June 20, 1979, in Los Angeles. Over 2 1/2 years they converted a bare four-walled space into a 99-seat theater.

== Death ==
Dynarski died on February 27, 2020, in Studio City, Los Angeles, at the age of 86.

== Filmography ==
Year	Title	Role	Notes
1965	Morituri	Merchant Marine	Uncredited
1966	Star Trek: The Original Series	Ben Childress	S1:E6, "Mudd's Women"
1966	The Monkees	Zeppo	S1:E16, "Son of a Gypsy"
1967	The Monkees	Toto	S1:E26, "Monkee Chow Mein"
1967	Voyage to the Bottom of the Sea	Centaur I	Episode: "Journey with Fear"
1968	In Enemy Country	Capek	
1969	Star Trek: The Original Series	Krodak	S3E16 "The Mark of Gideon"
1971	Duel	Truck Driver in Chuck's Cafe	
1974	Airport 1975	1st. Friend	
1974	Earthquake	Dam Caretaker	
1976	All the President's Men	Court Clerk	
1976	Starsky and Hutch	Vic Bellamy	S1:E22
1977	Close Encounters of the Third Kind	Ike	
1984	Best Defense	Gil	
1985	Movers & Shakers	Board Member #2	
1988	Star Trek: The Next Generation	Quinteros	Episode: "11001001"
1989	Breaking In	Brock, Ernie's Mob Connection	
1996	Command & Conquer: Red Alert	Joseph Stalin	
1997	Seinfeld	Izzy Mandelbaum Jr.	S9E4 "The Blood"
1999	Boy Meets World	Mr. Peterman	S7E7 "It's About Time"
2000	The X-Files	Ernie Stefaniuk	S8E3 "Patience"
