= Eddie Barth =

American actor (1931–2010)

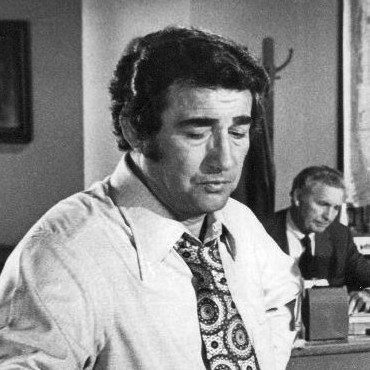
- Barth on Shaft in 1973
- Born: Edward Michael Bartholetti; September 29, 1931; Philadelphia, Pennsylvania, U.S.
- Died: May 28, 2010 (aged 78); Los Angeles, California, U.S.
- Occupation: Actor
- Years active: 1963–2003
- Spouse: Sally Hada (m. 1961)

Eddie Barth (born Edward Michael Bartholetti; September 29, 1931 – May 28, 2010) was an American actor. Barth earned the nickname Mr. Gravel for his raspy vocals in his voiceover work.

== Career ==
Born Edward Michael Bartholetti in Philadelphia, Pennsylvania., Barth portrayed Myron Fowler, the owner of Peerless Detectives, a rival detective agency in 38 episodes of the television series Simon & Simon between 1981 and 1989. He portrayed a police lieutenant on the series Shaft and appeared in such television series as Night Court, Murder, She Wrote, and Civil Wars.

His best-known voiceover commercial work was for an advertising campaign for Miller Lite during the 1980s. Barth closed the Miller Lite television commercials by reading the slogan "Lite Beer from Miller. Everything you always wanted in a beer. And less.". His other voiceover credits included Superman: The Animated Series, Osmosis Jones, Babe: Pig in the City, and Men in Black: The Series.

== Death ==
Eddie Barth died of heart failure at his home in Los Angeles on May 28, 2010, at the age of 78.

== Filmography ==
=== Film ===
Year	Title	Role	Notes
1971	Bananas	Paul	Credited as Ed Barth
1971	Shaft	Tony	Credited as Ed Barth
1971	Made for Each Other	Ronnie	
1974	The Super Cops	Detroit Hitman / Driver	Uncredited
1977	Thunder and Lightning	Rudi Volpone	Credited as Ed Barth
1979	The Amityville Horror	Agucci	
1979	Boardwalk	Eli Rosen	
1980	Fame	Angelo	
1987	Born in East L.A.	Lester	
1990	Twenty Dollar Star	Joe Hogan	
1991	Rover Dangerfield	Champ (voice)	
1994	Mr. Write	Dad	
1994	Killing Obsession	Limo Dispatcher	
1998	Babe: Pig in the City	Nigel, Alan (voice)	
2001	Osmosis Jones	Conductor (voice)	

=== Television ===
Year	Title	Role	Notes
1963	The Twilight Zone	Sailor	Episode: "The New Exhibit"; credited as Ed Barth
1967	Cimarron Strip	2nd Man	Episode: "Broken Wing"; credited as Ed Barth
1967	The F.B.I.	Bossio, Taxi Driver	Episode: "Overload"; credited as Ed Barth
1967	The Invaders	Cab Driver	Episode: "The Believers"; credited as Ed Barth
1969	Judd, for the Defense	Customs Clerk	Episode: "An Elephant in a Cigar Box"; credited as Ed Barth
1969	Mannix	Foreman	Episode: "The Sound of Darkness"; credited as Ed Barth
1970	Then Came Bronson	Foreman	Episode: "Still Waters"; credited as Ed Barth
1973	Honor Thy Father	Grocer	Television film; uncredited
1973–1974	Shaft	Lt. Al Rossi	7 episodes
1974	The Streets of San Francisco	Ed Cooper	Episode: "Cry Help!"
1974	It Couldn't Happen to a Nicer Guy	Sgt. Riggs	Television film; credited as Ed Barth
1975	Cannon	Paddy Chabreau	Episode: "Missing at FL307"; credited as Ed Barth
1975	Barney Miller	Detective DeLuca	Episode: "Stakeout"; credited as Ed Barth
1975	Baretta	Al Velance	Episode: "Ragtime Billy Peaches"; credited as Ed Barth
1975	The Orphan and the Dude	Sam Brodsky	Television film; credited as Ed Barth
1975	Matt Helm	Taffy	Episode: "Double Jeopardy"; credited as Ed Barth
1975	Kojak	Joe Torrey	Episode: "A House of Prayer, a Den of Thieves"; credited as Ed Barth
1976	Joe and Sons	Pelekoudas	Episode: "Jimmy Flynn's Wake"
1976	Popi	Cop	Episode: "Love Letters"
1976	Rich Man, Poor Man	Papadakis	2 episodes; credited as Ed Barth
1976	Amelia Earhart	Sid Isaacs	Television film
1977	The Bionic Woman	Saul	Episode: "Once a Thief"; credited as Ed Barth
1977	Husbands and Wives	Harry Bell	Television film
1978	C.P.O. Sharkey	Fowler	Episode: "Tell It to the Marines"
1978	Husbands, Wives & Lovers	Harry Bellini	10 episodes
1979	The Man in the Santa Claus Suit	Babyskin	Television film
1980	Alice	Ernie 'Rocky' Rockwell	Episode: "Auld Acquaintances Should Be Forgot"
1980	Jimmy B. & André	Tassos	Television film
1980	Stone	Vandis	4 episodes
1980	Ethel Is an Elephant	Harold Brainer	Television film
1980	Number 96	Lou Sugarman	Episode: "Roger Moves In"
1981	The Incredible Hulk	Sam Brandes	Episode: "Patterns"
1981	Hill Street Blues	Tanner	Episode: "Jungle Madness"
1981–1988	Simon & Simon	Myron Fowler / Max	38 episodes
1982	T.J. Hooker	Singer	Episode: "The Protectors"
1983	The Paper Chase	Lars	Episode: "Snow"
1984	Whiz Kids	Gregg	Episode: "Watch Out!"
1984	Silver Spoons	Dom	Episode: "The World's Greatest Father"
1984	The Red-Light Sting	Sam Hollander	Television film
1984	Challenge of the GoBots	Road Ranger	2 episodes
1984	The Love Boat	Joey Weasel Malone	Episode: "Only the Good Die Young/Honey Beats the Odds/The Light of Another Day"
1984	The New Mike Hammer	Ritchie	4 episodes
1984; 1993–1994	Murder, She Wrote	Richie Kanpinski	3 episodes
1985	Scarecrow and Mrs. King	Gino	Episode: "Car Wars"
1985	Magnum, P.I.	Harry Granger	Episode: "Rapture"
1985	Night Court	Morty Fleckman / Blacky Buzzlick	Episode: "Walk, Don't Wheel"
1986	Perfect Strangers	Examiner	Episode: "Baby, You Can Drive My Car"
1986	Blacke's Magic	Oscar	Episode: "Wax Poetic"
1986	ABC Weekend Special	Sam Mateo	Episode: "The Day the Kids Took Over"
1986	Life with Lucy	Mr. Lawrence Mulgrew	Episode: "Breaking Up Is Hard to Do"
1987	Full House	Lou	Episode: "Knock Yourself Out"
1987	The Law & Harry McGraw	Morty Waxman	Episode: "State of the Art"
1987	The New Mike Hammer	Mr. Monroe	Episode: "Kill John Doe"
1989	Doctor Doctor	Raymond	2 episodes
1989	An Eight Is Enough Wedding	Cabbie	Television film
1990	The Outsiders	Skalka	Episode: "Carnival"
1991–1992	Night Court	Morty Fleckman	2 episodes.
1992–1993	Civil Wars	Charlie Howell, Sr.	5 episodes
1993	Biker Mice from Mars	Gorgonzola (voice)	Episode: "A Scent, a Memory, a Far Distant Cheese"
1995	Deadline for Murder: From the Files of Edna Buchanan	Mickey Rosen	Television film
1996	Ink	Sid	Episode: "The Sandwich"
1997	Superman: The Animated Series	Kurt Bowman (voice)	2 episodes
1997–2001	Men in Black: The Series	Frank the Pug (voice)	28 episodes
2002–2003	As Told by Ginger	Louie, Referee (voice)	2 episodes
