= Brief Season =

- Directed by: Renato Castellani
- Written by: Renato Castellani; Adriano Baracco; Dino Maiuri
- Produced by: Dino De Laurentiis
- Cinematography: Antonio Secchi
- Music by: Ennio Morricone
- Release date: 26 October 1969
- Running time: 96 minutes
- Country: Italy
- Language: Italian

Brief Season (Italian: Una breve stagione, also known as As Long as it Lasts) is a 1969 Italian drama film written and directed by Renato Castellani.

== Plot ==
Johnny is a young American who lives in Rome, where he exercises the profession of stockbroker. Luisa is a Swedish girl who works as a simultaneous translator at the FAO. They meet on the occasion of a TV show, and fall in love.

Johnny, intending to secure a future for himself and Luisa, sells some securities in his care to attempt a stock market speculation based on some confidential information, but things do not go as expected.

== Cast ==
- Christopher Jones as Johnny
- Pia Degermark as Luisa
- Antonello Trombadori as Luisa's father
- Angelo Boscariol
- Valeria Sabel
- Bianca Doria
