= I, Mudd =

- Star Trek: The Original Series episode
- Episode no.: Season 2 Episode 8
- Directed by: Marc Daniels
- Written by: Stephen Kandel; David Gerrold (uncredited)
- Cinematography by: Jerry Finnerman
- Production code: 041
- Original air date: November 3, 1967

Guest appearances
- Roger C. Carmel – Harry Mudd; Richard Tatro – Norman; Alyce Andrece – Alice #1 through #250; Rhae Andrece – Alice #251 through #500; Kay Elliot – Stella Mudd; Michael Zaslow – Jordan; Mike Howden – Lt. Rowe; Roger Holloway – Lt. Lemli; Bob Orrison – 1st Engineer

Episode chronology
← Previous "Catspaw"	Next → "Metamorphosis"
- Star Trek: The Original Series season 2

"I, Mudd" is the eighth episode of the second season of the American science fiction television series Star Trek. Written by Stephen Kandel and directed by Marc Daniels, it was first broadcast on November 3, 1967.

The crew of the Enterprise has a second encounter with the conman Harry Mudd (Roger C. Carmel), first seen in the season one episode "Mudd's Women". Mudd is now the supreme ruler of a planet of androids who cater to his every whim.

== Plot ==
An alien android posing as a Starfleet lieutenant and identifying himself as Norman, hijacks the Enterprise by sealing off engineering and setting a booby trap which would cause any attempt to restore control to destroy the ship. Captain Kirk finds his ship and crew taken to an unknown planet populated by androids, and meets an old nemesis, the outlaw Harry Mudd. Calling himself "Mudd the First" and ostensibly ruling the androids, Mudd displays a darkened glass panel, which he calls a "shrine" to his wife Stella. It contains an android version of his wife which nags him as she did, but he is able to silence her instantly by ordering her to "shut up".

Mudd admits that he broke out of prison, stole a spaceship, crashed on this planet, and was taken in by the androids. He says they are accommodating, but refuse to let him go unless he provides them with other humans to serve and study. Mudd informs Kirk that he and his crew are to serve this purpose and can expect to spend the rest of their lives there.

Kirk questions the androids and discovers they were built by travelers from the Andromeda Galaxy whose planet was destroyed by a supernova, leaving the androids to fend for themselves. First Officer Spock discovers that the androids number over 200,000, and concludes that there must be some central control mechanism.

The Enterprise crew is beamed to the surface and replaced by an android crew. The Enterprise people find much appealing about the androids' world: Scotty is fascinated by their engineering knowledge; Ensign Chekov likes the idea of living on a planet full of compliant female androids; and Uhura is tempted by the offer of immortality in an android body. Kirk will have none of this, however, and reminds them of their duty.

After a final farewell to Stella, Mudd plans to depart aboard Enterprise, but the androids refuse his order to beam him aboard. They have their own agenda: to leave the planet and offer their "services" to humanity, with the goal of bringing the greedy and aggressive human race under their control.

As the Enterprise crew discuss their predicament, Spock notes that all of the androids belong to various named series, except for the one named Norman. Kirk recalls that an android called on Norman to "coordinate" the analysis of an "illogical" statement. Spock concludes that Norman is the central locus of the composite android mind, and Kirk suggests that "wild, irrational illogic aimed right at Norman" could be a potent weapon against that mind.

The crew then attempt to confuse the androids by means of contradictory statements and a series of bizarre theatrics, culminating with Mudd and Kirk posing the liar paradox to Norman: Kirk claims everything Mudd says is a lie; and Mudd says to Norman, "I am lying." Unable to resolve the contradiction, Norman's mind burns out, which immediately causes the other androids to shut down.

The crew reprogram Norman and the other androids to return to their original tasks of making the planet productive. Kirk informs Mudd that he has been paroled to the android population as an example of a human failure, and that a special android has been programmed to see to his needs as an incentive to work with the androids and not exploit them. Mudd is grateful until he discovers that this android is Stella, and there are now at least 500 copies of her – none of whom responds to his command to "shut up".

== Production and reception ==
The producers liked the script resulting from Gerrold's work on "The Trouble with Tribbles" so much that Gerrold was later tasked with re-writing the script for this episode.

Although Kandel is the credited writer on the episode, David Gerrold performed an uncredited rewrite. The final script was heavily revised by the staff, and Gerrold admits that only one original idea of his made it into the final episode. He also claims producer Gene L. Coon offered to put the matter of credit up for Writers Guild arbitration but that he declined.

In 2009, the AV Club called it "goofy, but charmingly surreal", "infectiously silly" and "a treat," giving it an A− grade.

In 2014, Charlie Jane Anders at io9 ranked "I, Mudd" as the 79th best episode of Star Trek in a list of the top 100 Star Trek episodes.

In 2016, Syfy noted this episode for actress Nichelle Nichols presentation of Uhura, as having her fifth best scene in Star Trek.

In 2024, Hollywood.com ranked "I, Mudd" at number 39 out of the 79 original series episodes.

== See also ==
Other encounters with Harcourt Fenton Mudd:

- "Choose Your Pain" — first encounter (chronologically), a Star Trek: Discovery episode
- "Magic to Make the Sanest Man Go Mad" — the second encounter in Star Trek: Discovery
- "The Escape Artist" — a Star Trek: Short Treks episode
- "Mudd's Women" — first encounter in the original series
- "Mudd's Passion" — another encounter, in Star Trek: The Animated Series
- "Another Fine Mess" - an episode in the Star Trek: 25th Anniversary computer game
