= Maggie Thrett =

American actress (1946–2022)

- Thrett in Star Trek: The Original Series (1966)
- Born: Diane Pine; November 18, 1946; New York City, New York, U.S.
- Died: December 18, 2022 (aged 76); New Hyde Park, New York, U.S.
- Occupations: Actress, singer
- Years active: 1962–1985
- Spouse: Donnelly Rhodes (m. 1975; div. 1977)

Maggie Thrett (born Diane Pine; November 18, 1946 – December 18, 2022) was an American actress.

== Biography ==
At age 15, she made her off-Broadway debut in 1962 in Out Brief Candle. By the age of 18, she was regularly performing as a dancer at Trude Heller's in Greenwich Village, New York, as observed in the January 1965 edition of Harper's Bazaar.

As a vocalist, Thrett recorded a single (under her birth name) entitled "Lucky Girl" for Take 3 Records in 1964, and had a minor US hit (as Maggie Thrett) in 1965 with "Soupy", produced by Bob Crewe and issued on the DynoVoice (formerly Dyno-Vox) label. Billboard journalist Aaron Sternfield, reviewing a live performance at Basin Street East, New York, on July 15, 1965, wrote that she "has a magnificent range, her phrasing and timing are near perfect, and she blends the right combination of sex and satire."

In 1966, Thrett went to Hollywood to further her acting career. As an actress, she had roles in a Star Trek episode ("Mudd's Women", 1966) and the comedy movie Three in the Attic (1968). She also appeared as a prostitute in the movie Cover Me Babe (1970). Having signed to Universal Studios, she is reported to have used her life savings to buy out her contract prior to appearing in Three in the Attic for American International Pictures.

In May 1970, Thrett was involved in a road accident while a passenger on singer-songwriter Gram Parsons' motorcycle. She was apparently unharmed; Parsons, meanwhile, suffered significant injuries. Her last appearance on TV was in 1974 on the show Run, Joe, Run with her then husband Donnelly Rhodes. She continued her musical career – under her birth name, Diane Pine – as a studio backup singer until the mid-1980s.

== Personal life and death ==
Thrett was married to Canadian actor Donnelly Rhodes from 1975 to 1977. She died in New Hyde Park, New York, on December 18, 2022, at the age of 76.

== Discography ==
- "Lucky Girl" / "Your Love is Mine" (Take 3 709, 1964)
- "Soupy" / "Put a Little Time Away" (DynoVoice 205, 1965)
- "Soupy" / "Put a Little Time Away" (Barry B-3347, 1965) (Canadian release)

A further DynoVoice single, "Walk On By", is referenced in Aaron Sternfield's Billboard review of Thrett's July 1965 Basin Street East performance. However, no evidence of this single's release is in the DynoVoice singles catalog, nor does any other source appear to corroborate its existence.

== Filmography ==
- Dimension 5 as second Sister (1966 movie)
- Out of Sight as Wipe Out (1966 movie)
- Run for Your Life as Brenda in "The Night of the Terror" (1966 TV episode)
- Star Trek: The Original Series (1966) – Ruth Bonaventure in S1:E6, "Mudd's Women"
- The Wild Wild West as Rita Leon in "The Night of the Freebooters" (1966 TV episode)
- I Love a Mystery (1967 TV movie, aired 1973)
- Dundee and the Culhane as Wimea in "The Death of a Warrior Brief" (1967 TV episode)
- The Wild Wild West as Deirdre (Topaz) in "The Night of the Running Death" (1967 TV episode)
- The Devil's Brigade as Millie (1968 movie)
- Three in the Attic as Jan (1968 movie)
- Cimarron Strip as Red Deer in "Heller" (1968 TV episode)
- I Dream of Jeannie as Joan in "Never Put a Genie on a Budget" (1969 TV episode)
- Lost Flight as second Girl (1969 TV movie)
- Cover Me Babe as Prostitute (1970 movie)
- McCloud as Godiva in "Manhattan Manhunt Part 1: Horse Stealing on Fifth Avenue" (1970 TV episode)
- The Most Deadly Game as Lisa in "Model for Murder" (1970 TV episode)
