= The Legend of Jesse James (TV series) =

American western television series (1965-66)

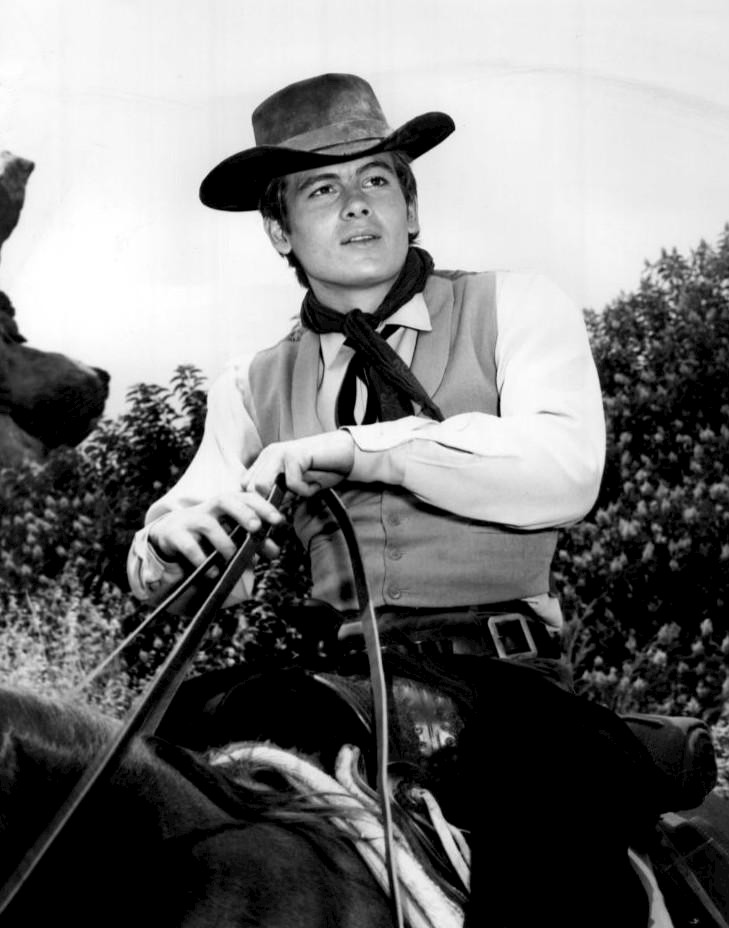
- Christopher Jones as Jesse James
- Genre: Western
- Starring: Christopher Jones; Allen Case; Ann Doran; Robert J. Wilke; John Milford
- Theme music composer: Irving Gertz; Ken Darby
- Country of origin: United States
- Original language: English
- No. of seasons: 1
- No. of episodes: 34

Production
- Executive producer: David Weisbart
- Producer: Don Siegel
- Camera setup: Single-camera
- Running time: 25 mins.
- Production company: 20th Century-Fox Television

Original release
- Network: ABC
- Release: September 13, 1965 – May 9, 1966

The Legend of Jesse James is an American Western television series starring Christopher Jones in the title role of notorious outlaw Jesse James. Produced by Don Siegel, it aired on ABC from September 13, 1965, to May 9, 1966.

== Guest stars ==
- Claude Akins
- John Anderson
- Robert Anderson
- E. J. André
- Whitney Blake
- Lloyd Bochner
- Charles Bronson
- Walter Burke
- Michael Burns
- Harry Carey, Jr.
- John Carradine
- John Cassavetes
- Glenn Corbett
- Richard H. Cutting
- Royal Dano
- Don Eitner
- Jack Elam
- Gene Evans
- Shug Fisher
- Sam Gilman
- Virginia Gregg
- Mariette Hartley
- Peter Helm
- Joe Higgins
- Rex Holman
- Dennis Hopper
- Jeffrey Hunter
- Victor Jory
- Sally Kellerman
- Douglas Kennedy
- George Kennedy
- Gary Lockwood
- Strother Martin
- Ken Mayer
- Kevin McCarthy
- Tim McIntire
- Gregg Palmer
- J. Pat O'Malley
- Nehemiah Persoff
- Slim Pickens
- Kurt Russell
- Albert Salmi
- Mickey Shaughnessy
- Robert F. Simon
- Ann Sothern
- Warren Stevens
- Harold J. Stone
- Susan Strasberg
- Lyle Talbot
- Buck Taylor
- Vaughn Taylor
- Kelly Thordsen
- Tom Tully

== Episodes ==
No.	Title	Original release date
1	"Jailbreak"	November 15, 1965
2	"The Judas Boot"	November 8, 1965
3	"The Quest"	November 1, 1965
4	"The Widow Fay"	December 20, 1965
5	"The Pursuers"	October 11, 1965
6	"The Dead Man's Hand"	September 20, 1965
7	"The Celebrity"	December 6, 1965
8	"Three Men from Now"	September 13, 1965
9	"Put Me In Touch With Jesse"	September 27, 1965
10	"Vendetta"	October 25, 1965
11	"Return to Lawrence"	January 31, 1966
12	"The Raiders"	October 18, 1965
13	"The Man Who Was"	December 13, 1965
14	"The Man Who Killed Jesse"	December 27, 1965
15	"One Too Many Mornings"	November 22, 1965
16	"The Empty Town"	January 3, 1966
17	"Manhunt"	November 29, 1965
18	"The Cave"	February 7, 1966
19	"A Real Tough Town"	January 24, 1966
20	"Reunion"	January 10, 1966
21	"Things Don't Just Happen"	March 14, 1966
22	"The Colt"	January 17, 1966
23	"The Hunted and the Hunters"	April 11, 1966
24	"1863"	March 28, 1966
25	"South Wind"	February 14, 1966
26	"Wee Benjamin Bates"	February 28, 1966
27	"The Lonely Place"	February 21, 1966
28	"The Chase"	March 7, 1966
29	"As Far As The Sea"	March 21, 1966
30	"Last Stand of Captain Hammel"	April 4, 1966
31	"Dark Side of the Moon"	April 18, 1966
32	"A Field of Wild Flowers"	April 25, 1966
33	"A Burying for Rosey"	May 9, 1966
34	"Wanted: Dead Only"	May 2, 1966

== Merchandising ==
The TV series was adapted into a comic strip by Dan Spiegle, distributed by Gold Key Comics.
