= Mudd's Passion =

- Star Trek: The Animated Series episode
- Episode no.: Season 1 Episode 10
- Directed by: Hal Sutherland
- Written by: Stephen Kandel
- Production code: 22008
- Original air date: November 10, 1973

Guest appearance
- Roger C. Carmel - Harry Mudd

Episode chronology
← Previous "Once Upon a Planet"	Next → "The Terratin Incident"

"Mudd's Passion" is the tenth episode of the first season of the American animated science fiction television series Star Trek: The Animated Series. It first aired in the NBC Saturday morning lineup on November 10, 1973, and was written by Stephen Kandel (Note: This story was expanded into a novelette by science-fiction author Alan Dean Foster as part of the collection Star Trek Log Three (1975) (ISBN 0-345-24260-2).) who had written the previous "Mudd" episode, The Original Series's "I, Mudd", as well as the teleplay for Gene Roddenberry's first "Mudd" episode, "Mudd's Women".

In this episode, the Enterprise brings aboard con-artist Harry Mudd who spreads a fast-acting love potion on the ship. The story features actor Roger C. Carmel voicing an uncredited reprise of his live-action role as Harry Mudd.

== Plot ==
The starship Enterprise receives orders to arrest Federation outlaw Harry Mudd, who is accused of selling fake love-crystals. Intercepting Mudd on the mining colony of Motherlode, they bring him aboard the Enterprise. Mudd explains that he escaped the custody of the android planet (Note: An otherwise unpopulated planet where Kirk had arranged for Mudd to be "paroled" at the end of The Original Series episode "I, Mudd".) by stealing a ship. While on Ilyra VI, Mudd committed fraud by selling Starfleet Space Academy to its inhabitants. His sale earned him enough credits to get him to Sirius IX.

After convincing Nurse Chapel to use a love-crystal to win the affection of the Vulcan Science Officer, Mr. Spock, Mudd abducts her, steals a shuttlecraft, and escapes to a rocky planet. During the battle between Mudd and Chapel, some of his love-crystals are broken near an air-vent. The love-crystal affects Spock, making him insist on pursuing Mudd to the planet, accompanied by Captain Kirk.

The broken love-crystals affect the entire crew of the Enterprise. As Mudd told them, the love-crystals are heterosexual in nature, inducing feelings of love in those of opposite sex and friendship in those of the same sex. Kirk and Spock find Chapel and Mudd, but the four of them are attacked by creatures made of rock which inhabit the planet. Moreover, a new phase of the love-crystals' influence causes them to bicker with each other, while the ship's crew are too intoxicated by the love-crystals to beam them back up. To buy time, Kirk throws the remaining love-crystals to the rock creatures. The four are beamed back to the Enterprise, where Spock notes that the love-crystals' short duration and after-effect of enmity make them of little value, and Chapel records a confession of Mudd's misdeeds since his escape from the android planet so that he can be returned to rehabilitation.

== Reception ==
Altman and Gross's 1998 book, TrekNavigator: The Ultimate review guide to the entire Trek saga, praised Roger Carmel's performance and the episode's "sophisticated wit and humor", and deemed it a high point for the Star Trek animated series. They reasoned that other episodes in the animated series were merely rehashes of Star Trek's live-action elements, while "Mudd's Passion" expanded on the live-action series with new themes.

A 2018 Star Trek binge-watching guide by Den of Geek recommended this episode for featuring the trio of characters Kirk, Spock, and Bones of The Original Series.
