= Chubasco (film) =

1968 film

- Theatrical release poster
- Directed by: Allen H. Miner
- Screenplay by: Allen H. Miner
- Produced by: William Conrad
- Starring: Richard Egan; Christopher Jones; Susan Strasberg; Ann Sothern; Simon Oakland; Audrey Totter
- Cinematography: Paul Ivano; Louis Jennings
- Edited by: John W. Holmes
- Music by: William Lava
- Production company: William Conrad Productions
- Distributed by: Warner Bros.-Seven Arts
- Release date: June 5, 1968
- Running time: 100 minutes
- Country: United States
- Language: English

Chubasco is a 1968 American drama film written and directed by Allen H. Miner. The film stars Richard Egan, Christopher Jones, Susan Strasberg, Ann Sothern, Simon Oakland and Audrey Totter. The film was released by Warner Bros.-Seven Arts on June 5, 1968.

== Plot ==
Coming of age story about Chubasco who chooses a difficult path of hard labor at sea aboard a fishing boat.

== Cast ==
- Richard Egan as Sebastian
- Christopher Jones as Chubasco
- Susan Strasberg as Bunny
- Ann Sothern as Angela
- Simon Oakland as Laurindo
- Audrey Totter as Theresa
- Preston Foster as Nick
- Peter Whitney as Matt
- Edward Binns as Judge North
- Joe De Santis as Benito
- Norman Alden as Frenchy
- Stewart Moss as Les
- Ron Rich as Juno
- Milton Frome as Police Sergeant
- Ernest Sarracino as Juan
- Suzanne Benoit as Edna Belle
- Lili Valenty as Maria

== Production ==
Filming took place in San Diego, California.
