= Summertree =

1971 film by Anthony Newley

- Movie Poster
- Directed by: Anthony Newley
- Screenplay by: Edward Hume; Stephen Yafa
- Based on: Summertree by Ron Cowen
- Produced by: Kirk Douglas
- Starring: Michael Douglas; Jack Warden; Brenda Vaccaro; Barbara Bel Geddes
- Cinematography: Richard C. Glouner
- Edited by: Maury Winetrobe
- Music by: David Shire
- Production company: The Bryna Company
- Distributed by: Columbia Pictures
- Release date: June 9, 1971 (New York)
- Running time: 89 minutes
- Country: United States
- Language: English

Summertree is a 1971 American drama film directed by Anthony Newley, about a young man who drops out of university, falls in love with an older married woman, and contemplates dodging the draft to avoid serving in the Vietnam War. The screenplay was written by Edward Hume and Stephen Yafa, based on the 1967 play of the same name by Ron Cowen.

== Plot ==
In 1970, 20-year-old Jerry (Michael Douglas) visits his parents Herb (Jack Warden) and Ruth (Barbara Bel Geddes) to tell them he is considering dropping out of university to find himself. His parents are worried, not only because they have wasted expensive tuition on Jerry, but also because the Vietnam War is raging and by dropping out, Jerry will lose his student draft deferral.

Inspired by a television advertisement, Jerry becomes a Big Brother to a black child named Marvis (Kirk Calloway). When Marvis is slightly injured in a fall, they visit a hospital where Jerry meets a nurse named Vanetta (Brenda Vaccaro). Jerry and Vanetta soon fall in love, despite Vanetta being older than Jerry, and they begin living together. Jerry accidentally discovers an autographed photo of Vanetta declaring her love to a man named Tony (Bill Vint). Vanetta explains that Tony is her husband and they separated two years ago, although they are not divorced.

Jerry follows through on his plan to drop out of university. Confident in his self-taught guitar playing, he auditions for the conservatorium and gets a regular paying gig playing at a local coffeehouse. Herb discovers that Jerry has dropped out when he receives Jerry's draft notice in the mail. Jerry is initially not worried because he expects to be accepted to the conservatorium, which would restore his student draft deferral. Unfortunately, despite his impressive audition, the conservatorium rejects him for lack of any formal musical training. He investigates other ways to evade the draft, to no avail.

Jerry's streak of bad luck continues when Marvis's older brother is killed in Vietnam and Marvis takes his anger out on Jerry, ending their relationship. Next, Tony, having just returned from Vietnam wearing his Marine uniform, comes to Vanetta's apartment while she is out, and tells Jerry that Vanetta promised to wait for him. When Vanetta comes home, Jerry leaves to let her and Tony deal with their personal issues. Jerry buys an old Ford Falcon and plans to flee to Canada to evade the draft. Vanetta, torn between Tony and Jerry, decides not to accompany Jerry to Canada.

The night before Jerry is supposed to report for his induction physical, he visits his parents to tell them he is going to Canada and to say goodbye. After a family argument, Herb appears to accept his decision, but urges him to have his car inspected for safety at the local gas station the next day, and even buys him a set of new tires. While Jerry looks at some road maps, he overhears Herb attempting to bribe the gas station mechanic to disable Jerry's car so it cannot run for a few days, in order to prevent Jerry's departure. Jerry bursts into tears and drives his car out of the station into another car being towed by a tow truck.

In the final scene, Herb and Ruth go to bed as their bedroom television broadcasts news footage of action in Vietnam. As they close their eyes, the television shows a close-up of a dying Jerry being carried away by fellow soldiers.

== Cast ==
- Michael Douglas as Jerry McAdams
- Jack Warden as Herb McAdams
- Brenda Vaccaro as Vanetta
- Barbara Bel Geddes as Ruth McAdams
- Kirk Calloway as Marvis
- Bill Vint as Tony
- Jeff Siggins as Bennie
- Rob Reiner as Don
- William Smith as Draft Lawyer
- Garry Goodrow as Ginsberg
- Dennis Fimple as Shelly

== Production ==
Michael Douglas had been cast in the original play on Broadway but was fired from his role and replaced with David Birney. His father Kirk Douglas bought the rights to the play and filmed it with his son in the lead he lost.

The title refers to a tree house that Jerry returns to sit in. The original play by Ron Cowen went by "Summer Tree" until director Lloyd Richards suggested the change.

During the low-budget production, Brenda Vaccaro and Michael Douglas initially shared the same trailer, then began a six-year relationship. She guest starred twice with him in The Streets of San Francisco, playing a rookie cop in season 1, episode 15, and a hit-woman in season 3, episode 2, during that time.

== Critical reception ==
Roger Greenspun of The New York Times did not care for the film:

Summertree is a bad movie, but its badness proceeds not from its intentions, which seem honorable, or from its stylistic analogies to past modes, which in different hands could have been interesting. The badness exists, rather, moment by moment, in the insufficiency of each acted scene, in the niggling insecurity of Newley's camera, in the improverishment of each evocation of a quality of life—from the boy's dull guitar playing, which is supposed to be great, to the father's love of hunting, which should recreate the landscape, but only signifies a thoughtless and cruel pastime.

The Variety reviewer wrote "Newley brings individual scenes beautifully to life, with Douglas clearly defining his role as the personable-but-self-centered hero. Miss Vaccaro, despite the character's indecisiveness, is charming. The two of them make their love story fresh and believable." Gene Siskel of the Chicago Tribune gave the film 2 stars out of 4 and called it "occasionally moving," but found the relationships to "lack believability" and the ending "an ironic statement that is decidedly out of place." Richard Combs of The Monthly Film Bulletin wrote that Michael Douglas' performance "has an energy and vitality that gives an edge to the theme of wasted youth. Other elements in Summertree blend less successfully—the contrived spontaneity of Jerry's romance with Vanetta and the fragmentary treatment of his relationship with the negro boy. Anthony Newley's direction, however, is surprisingly unselfconscious and responsive to a talented cast, though there is little he can do with the over-neat tying together of all the ironies in the last half hour."

== See also ==
- List of American films of 1971
