= The Name of the Game Is Kill! =

1968 film directed by Gunnar Hellström

- Film poster
- Directed by: Gunnar Hellström
- Written by: Gary Crutcher
- Produced by: Jay Lovins; Robert A. Poore
- Starring: Jack Lord; Susan Strasberg; Collin Wilcox Paxton
- Cinematography: Vilmos Zsigmond
- Edited by: Lou Lombardo
- Music by: Stu Phillips
- Production company: Poore-Todd Productions
- Distributed by: Fanfare Films (US)
- Release date: May 29, 1968
- Running time: 84 minutes
- Country: United States
- Language: English

The Name of the Game Is Kill! is a 1968 American thriller film directed by Gunnar Hellström and starring Jack Lord, Susan Strasberg, Collin Wilcox Paxton and Tisha Sterling. The film is about a drifter (Lord) who is invited into the household of a eccentric family in rural Arizona, who may have sinister intentions.

== Plot ==
A man resting in a rural southwest setting is bludgeoned with a replica Venus de Milo statue and his body dragged to an open fire.

Symcha Lipa, a Hungarian drifter, is resting at the side of a dusty Arizona road. He is picked up by Mickey Terry, who drives him to her home and offers him a shower before he goes on his way. Mickey lives with her mother and two sisters, but only the older sister, Diz, is there at the time. The sisters have a brief argument, with Diz implying that Mickey picked up Lipa to be her latest sexual partner. They are joined by the youngest sister, Nan, who has just been expelled from school for her latest incident of misbehavior, and the mother.

The next morning when Lipa leaves the Terry home, he is run down by a car coming up behind him. He is knocked unconscious and spends three days in hospital, but suffers no lasting injuries. The investigating sheriff cautions him about the Terry household, telling him mysterious things have happened there, including the disappearance of Julio Lamberto, a man who spent time with the Terry women.

Despite the warning, Lipa returns to the Terry home. Only Diz is there at the time. They have a long talk and Diz tells him about the time years before when her mother killed her abusive father. Later, greatly agitated, she tries to kiss Lipa, saying she wants to save him from Mickey. He easily moves away from her.

When the other three women return home, Lipa asks the mother if he can work in the family business in return for room and board. His offer is accepted. Lipa goes to Mickey and they too have a long conversation. Mickey tells him she has fallen in love with him, but he tells her his capacity for love was lost in the aftermath of the Hungarian Revolution. Mickey talks to Lipa about her father, and also mentions she had been involved with Julio Lamberto. Even though Lipa had previously told Mickey she was moving too fast in their relationship, they become lovers and decide to move to San Francisco.

When they tell the rest of the family their intentions, the mother wishes them luck. They plan to leave the next day. It is almost Halloween and it will soon be Nan's birthday, so they decide to have a party that night to celebrate everything. Early in the festivities Nan goes missing. But she is soon found, she and Diz were merely working together to scare Lipa and Mickey.

That night Lipa chats, separately, with the mother and Nan. In all, the four women tell very different stories of what happened to the father. They all say he was artistically accomplished, specializing in Venus Di Milo replicas. The women also mention their interactions with Julio Lamberto.

The next day, Lipa and Mickey leave in the car, but have to return shortly after, as Diz had predicted they would, when Mickey realizes she does not have her money. When Mickey goes upstairs to look for it, Lipa is lured to a back room and knocked unconscious with a statue by Nan. She and Diz drag him to a furnace and open the grate and prepare to force his body in. Mickey and the mother arrive just in time to prevent it. As they struggle, Lipa regains consciousness. Nan, while calling out that Lipa must die, grasps at the mother's head and pulls. The mother is wearing a wig which Nan yanks off, and she is revealed, to the shock of all the sisters, to actually be their father.

Diz, overwhelmed, babbles that she told Nan to kill Lipa because he was going to cause the family to separate. Diz then says that she hated her mother and killed her years ago. The father supports her version, saying that his wife was a wicked woman with low morals. Nan confesses to having killed Julio Lamberto.

The father tells Mickey to go start her new life with Lipa in San Francisco. They drive off. The father returns to Diz and Nan and comforts then, and says they should have some tea. He removes three of the four pills he keeps in a locket around his neck, and drops one in each of the cups of tea he has prepared for them and for himself. While doing so he says, “It’s never too late to be a good father”.

Out on the highway, Lipa asks Mickey what actually happened to her mother. The camera freezes on Mickey's face and her enigmatic, possibly sinister smile.

== Cast ==
- Jack Lord as Symcha Lipa
- Susan Strasberg as Mickey Terry
- Collin Wilcox Paxton as Diz Terry
- Tisha Sterling as Nan Terry
- T.C. Jones as Mrs. Terry
- Mort Mills as Sheriff Fred Kendall
- Marc Desmond as the Doctor
- Lou Lombardo as Julio Lamberto (uncredited)

== Production ==
The film was shot entirely on-location in Arizona; in Jerome, Sedona, Clarkdale, and Prescott.

Earlier in development, the film was considered as a vehicle for Rock Hudson, and Roman Polanski was attached to direct. Later, Curtis Harrington was attached, and planned to cast George Hamilton and Tuesday Weld in the lead roles.

== Release ==
The film opened in Detroit on May 29, 1968.

== Bibliography ==
- Lisanti, Tom Fantasy Femmes of Sixties Cinema: Interviews with 20 Actresses from Biker, Beach, and Elvis Movies. McFarland, 2001.
