= Christopher Jones (actor, born 1941) =

American actor (1941–2014)

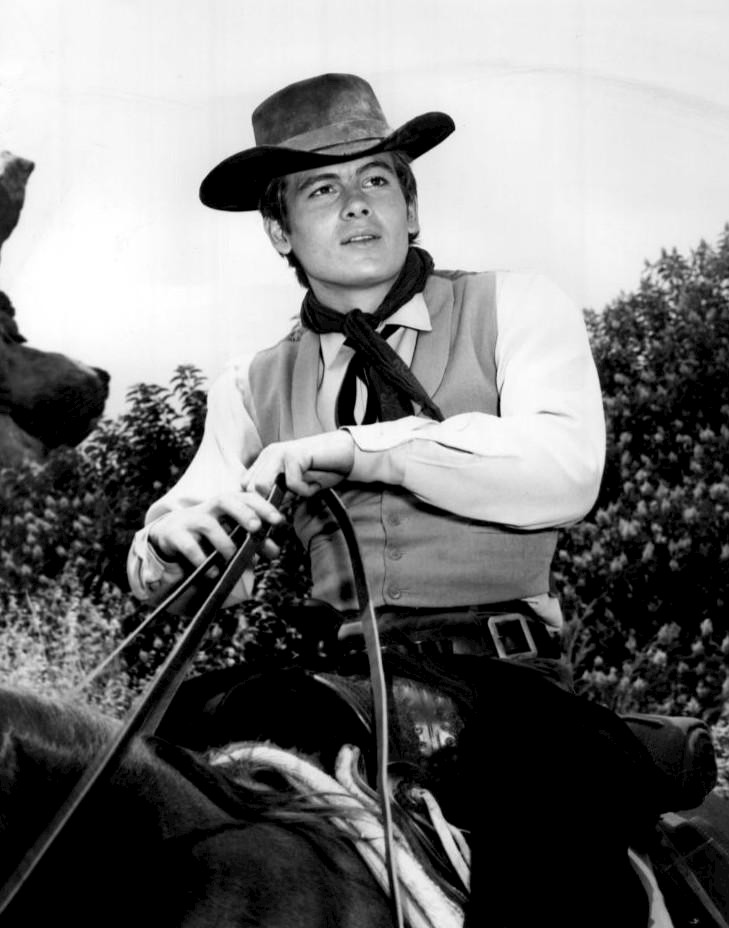
- Jones as the title character in The Legend of Jesse James (1965)
- Born: William Franklin Jones; August 18, 1941; Jackson, Tennessee, U.S.
- Died: January 31, 2014 (aged 72); Los Alamitos, California, U.S.
- Resting place: Hollywood Forever Cemetery
- Occupation: Actor
- Years active: 1965–1970, 1996
- Spouses: Susan Strasberg (m. 1965; div. 1968) Carrie Abernathy (m. 1976; div. 1983) Paula McKenna (m. 1983)
- Children: 7

William Franklin Jones (August 18, 1941 – January 31, 2014), known professionally as Christopher Jones, was an American actor. He was best known for his starring roles in the films Wild in the Streets (1968) and Ryan's Daughter (1970), and for playing the title role in the 1960s television series The Legend of Jesse James.

According to The New York Times, Jones' "talent and star power drew comparisons with James Dean," and he "seemed poised for stardom before abruptly abandoning his movie career in the late 1960s."

== Early life ==
He was born in Jackson, Tennessee, where his father was a grocery clerk and his mother, Robbie, was an artist. Jones's father and aunt admitted Robbie to the state hospital in Bolivar, Tennessee, in 1945. Jones and his brother were then placed in Boys Town in Memphis, where he became a fan of James Dean after being told he bore a resemblance to him. He then joined the Army, but went AWOL, and after serving a sentence in a military prison, he moved to New York City, where he began his acting career. His mother died when he was 19.

== Career ==
=== Early roles ===
Jones (having adopted the stage name Christopher) made his Broadway debut on December 17, 1961, in Tennessee Williams's The Night of the Iguana, directed by Frank Corsaro and starring Shelley Winters. Winters introduced Jones to actress Susan Strasberg, the daughter of method acting progenitor Lee Strasberg. Jones studied at Strasberg's Actors Studio.

Moving to Hollywood, Jones was cast in the title role of ABC's television series The Legend of Jesse James, which ran for 34 episodes in the 1965–66 season. When the series ended, he accepted the title role in the movie Chubasco (1967).

Jones made a guest appearance in the fourth season episode of The Man from U.N.C.L.E. titled; 'The Test Tube Killer Affair' playing a programmed killer.

=== Wild in the Streets ===
Jones's next acting role, was rock star and presidential aspirant Max Frost in the influential cult film Wild in the Streets (1968), co-starring Shelley Winters, Hal Holbrook, and Richard Pryor. Later that same year, Jones appeared with Yvette Mimieux in the sex comedy Three in the Attic.

=== Ryan's Daughter ===
After two films in Europe with Pia Degermark—The Looking Glass War and Brief Season, both in 1970—Jones was cast by director David Lean in Ryan's Daughter (1970). The two men had a difficult relationship; this was the experience of many actors who worked with Lean. The problems intensified when production of the film took 12 months instead of the expected six, because Lean would wait for the right composition of clouds or the perfect storm to brew. Unbeknownst to Jones, he was drugged during his filming of Ryan's Daughter by Sarah Miles, according to her first autobiography, A Right Royal Bastard; this caused him to believe he was having a breakdown. Jones also was involved in a car crash, not knowing he had been drugged. The director and producers never informed him of the drugging.

Later, Lean decided to have Julian Holloway re-record all of Jones' lines in post-production, a decision previously taken by Degermark for The Looking Glass War. Jones received poor notices anyway, which took a personal toll on him. He returned to California after filming ended and abandoned his acting career.

== Later life ==
After retiring from acting Jones engaged in a few long-term relationships, took up painting and sculpting, and lived quietly at the beach with his children.

Jones was offered the part of Zed in Pulp Fiction (1994) by director Quentin Tarantino, but he turned it down. He made a final screen appearance in the crime comedy Mad Dog Time (1996) for his friend, director/actor Larry Bishop, who had appeared in Wild in the Streets.

In his later years, Jones had a career as an artist and sculptor. His works included an oil painting of Rudolph Valentino that was displayed at the Hollywood Forever Cemetery.

== Personal life ==
Jones married three times and fathered seven children. He married his first wife, actress Susan Strasberg, on September 25, 1965, in Las Vegas. The couple met that same year when Strasberg was cast for a guest appearance in an episode of The Legend of Jesse James. At the time of the wedding, both Jones and Strasberg were reportedly abusing drugs. When Strasberg gave birth to their daughter, Jennifer Robin, six months later the baby was diagnosed with a congenital birth defect, which Strasberg blamed on both her and Jones's substance abuse. In 1967 Jones was cast to star in Chubasco (1967), and Strasberg played the lover/wife of his character. The couple divorced in 1968, according to Strasberg due to Jones' mental instability.

In 1976 Jones married Carrie Abernathy. They divorced in 1983, and later that year Jones married Paula McKenna.

According to Jones, he had an affair with Sharon Tate shortly before her murder.

=== Sexual assault allegation ===
In an August 2018 interview with The Guardian, actress Olivia Hussey claimed that Jones had raped her in 1969, when she was 18 years old. She stated the two had previously dated, but that the relationship had ended because of Jones' physical abuse. Hussey became pregnant as a result of the assault and later had an abortion.

== Death ==
Jones died on January 31, 2014, at the age of 72, owing to complications arising from gallbladder cancer. He is survived by seven children: Jennifer Strasberg, Christopher Jones Jr., Jeromy McKenna, Delon Jones, Tauer Jones, Calin Jones, and Seagen Jones. He is interred at the Hollywood Forever Cemetery.

== Filmography ==
=== Film ===
Year	Title	Role	Notes
1968	Chubasco	Chubasco	
1968	Wild in the Streets	Max Frost	
1968	Three in the Attic	Paxton Quigley	
1969	Brief Season	Johnny	
1970	The Looking Glass War	Leiser	
1970	Ryan's Daughter	Major Randolph Doryan	
1996	Mad Dog Time	Nicholas Falco	

=== Television ===
Year	Title	Role	Notes
1965-66	The Legend of Jesse James	Jesse James	Main role; 34 episodes
1967	Judd, for the Defense	Brandon Hill	Episode: "Defense in a Texas Town"
1967	The Man from U.N.C.L.E.	Greg Martin	Episode: "The Test Tube Killer Affair"
