= Roger C. Carmel =

American actor (1932–1986)

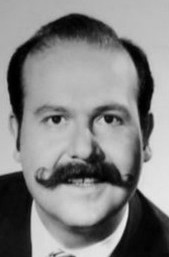
- Carmel publicity photo from The Mothers-in-Law (1967)
- Born: Roger Charles Carmel; September 27, 1932; Brooklyn, New York, U.S.
- Died: November 11, 1986 (aged 54); Hollywood, California, U.S.
- Resting place: New Mount Carmel Cemetery, Glendale, Queens, New York
- Occupation: Actor
- Years active: 1958–1986
- Known for: Harry Mudd
- Notable work: Star Trek

Roger Charles Carmel (September 27, 1932 – November 11, 1986) was an American actor. He originated several roles on Broadway, played scores of guest roles in television series, was a lead in the sitcom The Mothers-in-Law and appeared in motion pictures. He is most famous for his two appearances as the conniving Harry Mudd in Star Trek.

== Career ==
Carmel worked on Broadway from the late 1950s into the mid-1960s. He played multiple parts in The Power and the Glory (1958). He originated the roles of the 3rd Poet in Caligula (1960), Pasha in Once There Was a Russian (1961), The Deputy in Purlie Victorious (1961), and Mr. Andrikos in The Irregular Verb to Love (1963). He replaced Jack Creley in the role of Cardinal Wolsey in A Man for All Seasons (in 1962) and also replaced James Grout in Half a Sixpence (in 1966).

On television Carmel starred as the henpecked husband Roger Buell in the 1967 first season of the NBC sitcom The Mothers-in-Law, but was replaced by Richard Deacon in season two. When the first season ended, creator and producer Desi Arnaz told the entire cast that the show had a five-year guarantee but there was no money to give the contractual raises for the second season. While the other cast members agreed to forgo their salary increases, Carmel refused to forgo his. Carmel believed that Arnaz was illegally taking four salaries from the series—producer, creator, writer, and director—and this led him to quit the show (the series was canceled the following year).

Carmel's television guest roles included the accountant Doug Wesley on CBS's The Dick Van Dyke Show and Colonel Gumm on ABC's Batman. He played the flamboyant and hapless galactic criminal Harcourt Fenton "Harry" Mudd in two episodes of the original series of Star Trek, "Mudd's Women" (1966) and "I, Mudd" (1967), and one episode of Star Trek: The Animated Series, "Mudd's Passion" (1973). He also appeared in roles on The Patty Duke Show; I Spy; Blue Light; The Everglades; Hogan's Heroes; Car 54, Where Are You?; Banacek; The Man from U.N.C.L.E.; The Munsters; Voyage to the Bottom of the Sea; Hawaii Five-O; The High Chaparral; McMillan & Wife; All in the Family, and The San Pedro Beach Bums. He was a regular contestant on Pantomime Quiz, also known as Stump the Stars. His film roles included Gambit, Myra Breckinridge, Breezy, Thunder and Lightning, and Jerry Lewis's comeback film Hardly Working (1981).

== Later life and death ==
Later in his career, Carmel was a frequent voice actor. He voiced Smokey Bear in fire safety advertisements and Decepticon deputy leader Cyclonus in the third season of the Transformers animated series (having originated the role in 1986's The Transformers: The Movie and voicing other characters in the series' second season). In the television commercials for the Naugles chain of Mexican fast-food restaurants, he played the character of Señor Naugles.

Carmel was found dead in his Hollywood apartment on November 11, 1986. He was 54. His death certificate listed hypertrophic cardiomyopathy as the cause. Prior to his autopsy, police had speculated a "narcotics overdose". He was interred in New Mount Carmel Cemetery in Glendale, Queens, New York City. His plot is in the section dedicated to his parents' synagogue, Temple Beth Emeth.

== Television ==
- Route 66 (1960) – episode: "The Man on the Monkey Board" as Man in the Shower
- The Defenders (1961) – episode: "The Hundred Lives of Harry Simms" as Mr. Dinsmore
- Car 54, Where Are You? (1962) – episode: "Stop Thief" (uncredited)
- Route 66 (1964) – episode: "Where There's a Will, There's a Way"
- The Patty Duke Show (1964) – episode: "Author! Author!" as Mr. Blair
- The Man from U.N.C.L.E. (1964) – episode: "The Quadripartite Affair" as Milan Horth
- The Dick Van Dyke Show (1964) – episode: "It Wouldn't Hurt Them to Give Us a Raise" as Doug Wesley
- The Alfred Hitchock Hour (1965) – episode: "Crimson Witness" as Farnum Mullett
- The Munsters (1965) – episode: "Lily Munster, Girl Model" as Laszlo Brastoff
- The Man from U.N.C.L.E. (1965) – episode: "The Ultimate Computer Affair" as Captain Cervantes
- Hogan's Heroes (1965) – episode: "The Prisoner's Prisoner" as General Karl Schmidt
- I Spy (1965) – episode: "Affair in T'Sien Cha" as Edwin Wade
- Voyage to the Bottom of the Sea (1965) – episode: "The Machines Strike Back" as Admiral Halder
- The Phyllis Diller Show (1966) – episode: "Phyllis, the General Stealer" as Cannon
- I Spy (1966) – episode: "The Barter" as Gordon Merritt
- Star Trek: The Original Series (1966) – Harry Mudd in S1:E6, "Mudd's Women"
- Star Trek: The Original Series (1967) – Harry Mudd in S2:E8, "I, Mudd"
- Batman (1967) – episodes: "A Piece of the Action" & "Batman's Satisfaction" as Colonel Gumm
- I Spy (1967) – episode: "Red Sash of Courage" as Pappas
- The Mothers-in-Law (1967–69) – Main cast as Roger Buell
- It Takes a Thief (1968) – episode: "The Bill Is in Committee" as Paz
- Walt Disney's Wonderful World of Color (1969) – episode: "My Dog, the Thief: Parts 1 & 2" as McClure
- Ironside (1971) – episode: "Walls Are Waiting" as Mike Elman
- The High Chaparral (1971) – episode: "The New Lion of Sonora (Part 1)" as General Casados
- Hawaii Five-O (1971–1972) – 4 episodes as Misha the Bear
- Banacek (1972) – episode: "To Steal a King" as Oliver Garson
- Star Trek: The Animated Series (1973) – episode: "Mudd's Passion" as Harcourt Fenton Mudd (uncredited)
- McMillan & Wife (1973) – episode: "Death of a Monster... Birth of a Legend" as Houston Gorman
- McCloud (1975) – episode: "The Man with the Golden Hat" as David Kern
- The Hardy Boys/Nancy Drew Mysteries (1977) – episode: "Nancy Drew's Love Match" as John Bender
- All in the Family (1977) – episode: "Fire" as Mr. Ligway
- B.J. and the Bear (1979) – episode: "The Eyes of Texas" as Morton Jarvis
- Three's Company (1979) – episode: "Ralph's Rival" as Merl Denker
- The Misadventures of Sheriff Lobo (1980) – episode: "Mystery on the Orly Express" as Hubert Hemmings
- Laverne & Shirley (1980) – episodes: "Murder on the Moose Jaw Express: Parts 1 & 2" as The Waiter
- Hart to Hart (1980) – episode: "'Tis the Season to Be Murdered" as Walter Brent
- Diff'rent Strokes (1982) – episode: "On Your Toes" as Dimitri Kuznetsov
- The Transformers (1985–1987) – 32 episodes as various voice roles
- The Berenstain Bears (1985-1986) - 29 episodes as various voice roles
- The New Adventures of Jonny Quest (1986) – as additional voices
- Adventures of the Gummi Bears (1986) – 4 episodes as various voice roles
- DuckTales (1987) – episode – episode: "Master of the Djinni" as Sultan (voice)

== Filmography ==
- Stage Struck (1958) – Stagehand (uncredited)
- Act One (1963) – Hotel Clerk (uncredited)
- A House Is Not a Home (1964) – Dixie Keeler
- Goodbye Charlie (1964) – Inspector Frank McGill
- The Art of Love (1965) – Zorgus
- The Silencers (1966) – Andreyev
- Alvarez Kelly (1966) – Capt. Angus Ferguson
- The Venetian Affair (1966) – Mike Ballard
- Gambit (1966) – Ram
- Skullduggery (1970) – Otto Kreps
- Myra Breckinridge (1970) – Dr. Randolph Spencer Montag
- The Telephone Book (1971) – Analyst
- Bunco Boys and How To Beat Them (1973) - Bank Examiner Imposter
- Breezy (1973) – Bob Henderson
- Thunder and Lightning (1977) – Ralph Junior Hunnicutt
- That's Life (1979)
- Hardly Working (1980) – Robert Trent
- The Transformers: The Movie (1986) – Cyclonus / Quintesson Leader (voice)
- Transformers: Five Faces of Darkness (1986) – Cyclonus / Motormaster / Quintesson Judge #2 / Unicron (voice)
