= Susan Strasberg =

American actress and author (1938–1999)

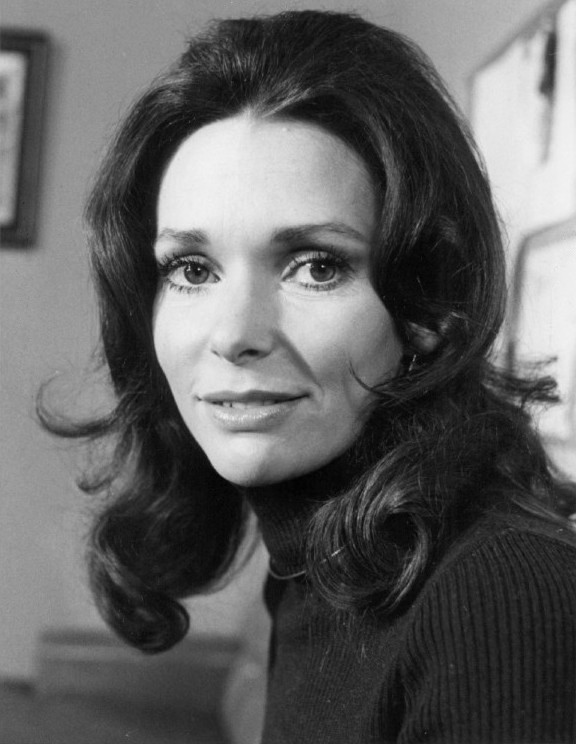
- Strasberg's 1973 promotional image for Mannix
- Born: Susan Elizabeth Strasberg; May 22, 1938; New York City, U.S.
- Died: January 21, 1999 (aged 60); New York City, U.S.
- Occupations: Actress; author
- Years active: 1953–1992
- Spouse: Christopher Jones (m. 1965; div. 1968)
- Children: 1
- Parent(s): Lee Strasberg; Paula Strasberg
- Relatives: John Strasberg (brother)

Susan Elizabeth Strasberg (May 22, 1938 – January 21, 1999) was an American stage, film, and television actress. Thought to be the next Hepburn-type ingenue, she was nominated for a Tony Award at age 18, playing the title role in The Diary of Anne Frank. She appeared on the covers of Life and Newsweek in 1955. A close friend of Marilyn Monroe, she wrote two best-selling tell-all books. Her later career primarily consisted of slasher and horror films, followed by TV roles, by the 1980s.

== Biography ==
=== Early life ===
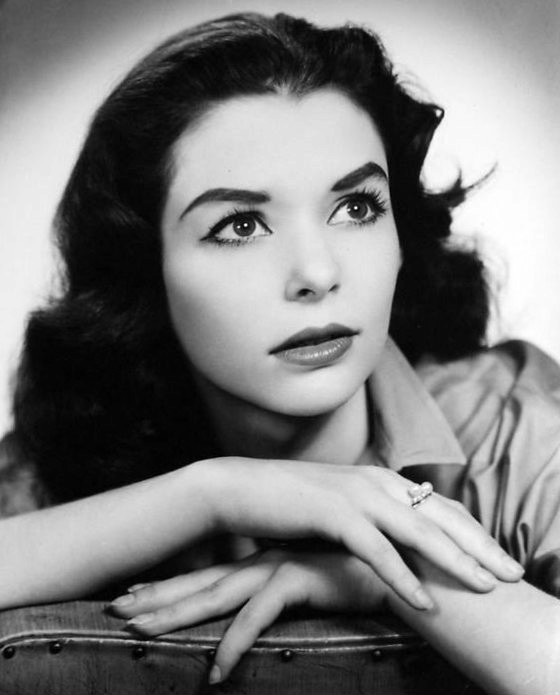
Strasberg in the 1950s

Strasberg was born in New York City to theatre director and drama coach Lee Strasberg of the Actors Studio and former actress Paula Strasberg. Her brother John is an acting coach. Her father was born in what is now Ukraine, and her mother in New York City. They were both from Jewish families who emigrated from Europe.

Strasberg attended the Professional Children's School, and then spent time at both The High School of Music & Art and the High School of Performing Arts. She also did some modelling.

=== Early roles ===
At age 14, Strasberg appeared off-Broadway in Maya in 1953, which ran seven performances. Her TV debut was in "Catch a Falling Star", an episode of Goodyear Playhouse directed by Delbert Mann the same year. She was in Romeo and Juliet for Kraft Theatre (1954), playing Juliet, and episodes of General Electric Theater and Omnibus. She had a regular role in a short-lived sitcom, The Marriage, playing the daughter of Hume Cronyn and Jessica Tandy. It was the first network show broadcast in color.

Strasberg made her film debut in The Cobweb (1955) and received some praise. She followed it with a widely praised performance as a teenager in Picnic (1955), playing the younger sister of Kim Novak. Kim Stanley played the role on Broadway but was too old for the film. Joshua Logan, the director, wrote that Strasberg's "incipient beauty and spirit seemed just right for me."

=== The Diary of Anne Frank ===
Strasberg originated the title role in the Broadway production of The Diary of Anne Frank, directed by Garson Kanin, which ran for 717 performances from 1955 to 1957. Brooks Atkinson wrote that she was "a slender, enchanting young lady with a heart-shaped face, a pair of burning eyes, and the soul of an actress." Strasberg was nominated for a Tony Award at the age of 18 and became the youngest actress to star on Broadway with her name above the marquee title. In 1955 she appeared twice on the cover of Life (July 11, 1955 issue; November 11, 1955 issue) and soon after on the cover of Newsweek (December 19, 1955 issue).

During her run on the show she did The Cradle Song with Helen Hayes on TV.

The success of the play led to numerous film offers, including parts in Peyton Place, Until They Sail and Gidget. She decided on the lead in Stage Struck (1958), directed by Sidney Lumet. It was a remake of Morning Glory (1933) with Katharine Hepburn. According to one obituary, "It had seemed as if the beautiful, dark-haired actress might have an impact equal to that made by Jean Simmons and Audrey Hepburn as ingenues."

Strasberg was not cast in the George Stevens film version of Anne Frank. Several reasons have been suggested for this: that Stevens did not want to deal with the influence of Strasberg's mother, Paula, and that Stevens saw Strasberg at the end of the play's run when her performance had become tired. Strasberg did not test for the role.

Strasberg's next appearance on Broadway was in Time Remembered (1957–58) by Jean Anouilh with Richard Burton and Helen Hayes. It was another success and ran for 248 performances.

Strasberg continued to guest star on TV shows like Westinghouse Desilu Playhouse, Play of the Week (a production of The Cherry Orchard with Hayes), and Our American Heritage. She was in the cast of the New York City Center production of William Saroyan's The Time of Your Life that played at the Brussels World Fair in 1958. It was filmed for Armchair Theatre.

Strasberg appeared in Sean O'Casey's The Shadow of a Gunman (1958–59) for Jack Garfein alongside members of the Actors Studio; it ran for 52 performances. Brooks Atkinson said she had "willowy freshness". In 1959 she toured with Franchot Tone in Caesar and Cleopatra.

=== Italy ===
She went to Europe to star in the Italian–Yugoslav Holocaust film Kapò (1960), which was nominated for an Academy Award as its year's Best Foreign Language Film. Strasberg enjoyed the experience and based herself in Italy for the next few years. "I wanted to see what it was like when I was alone", she said. In Rome, the Teatro Tordinona has dedicated a hall in her memory.

She traveled to England to make Taste of Fear (1961) for Hammer Films, and in Italy did Disorder (1962) with Louis Jourdan and the Hollywood film Hemingway's Adventures of a Young Man (1962).

=== Return to US ===
Strasberg returned to the US to appear on Broadway in The Lady of the Camellias (1963), directed by Franco Zeffirelli. The director said Strasberg had the qualities of being "romantic, cynical, classical, contemporary." The show only ran for 13 performances.

Strasberg began to concentrate on television, guest-starring on Dr Kildare, Bob Hope Presents the Chrysler Theatre, Breaking Point, Burke's Law, and The Rogues.

She made The High Bright Sun (1965) in England then went back to TV: Run for Your Life, The Legend of Jesse James (starring Christopher Jones, who became her husband), The Big Valley and The Invaders.

She made Chubasco (1967) with Jones, and did some counterculture movies: The Trip (1967) for Roger Corman, as the wife of Peter Fonda, and Psych-Out (1968) with Jack Nicholson. She also did The Name of the Game Is Kill! (1968), The Brotherhood (1968) and The Sisters (1969).

=== Late 1960s and 1970s ===
In the late 1960s & 1970s Strasberg did mostly TV: The Big Valley; The Virginian; Bonanza; Lancer; The Name of the Game; Premiere; Harry O; The F.B.I.; CBS Playhouse; Marcus Welby, M.D.; The Streets of San Francisco; Night Gallery; The Young Lawyers; McCloud; Alias Smith & Jones; The Sixth Sense; Assignment Vienna; The Wide World of Mystery; The Evil Touch; Owen Marshall, Counselor at Law; The Rockford Files (twice); and Mannix. "I did mediocre things because that way I didn't have to test myself", she said later. "I had a tremendous need not to shame my father."

She did occasional TV movies like Hauser's Memory (1970), Mr. and Mrs. Bo Jo Jones (1971) and ...And Millions Die! (1973) and the occasional feature like Ternos Caçadores (1970), The Legend of Hillbilly John (1972), and Orson Welles' The Other Side of the Wind (ultimately released in 2018).

Strasberg had a regular role on the series Toma (1974). She guested on Police Surgeon, McMillan & Wife, Petrocelli, Ellery Queen, Kate McShane, Medical Story, Bronk, and Harry O.

Strasberg had the lead in So Evil, My Sister (1974) and was in Mystery at Malibu (1975), Sammy Somebody (1976), SST: Death Flight (1977), Rollercoaster (1977), The Manitou (1977),Tre soldi e la donna di classe (1977), In Praise of Older Women (1978), The Immigrants (1978), and Beggarman, Thief (1979).

In 1976 she appeared in a short film directed by Lee Grant called The Stronger, based on a play by August Strindberg, which she said reignited her passion for acting.

In 1980 she published a memoir, Bittersweet, because she said her career was "stalled. . . . It seemed totally untenable to me, acting for 25 years—I had played Juliet, Cleopatra, and Anne Frank—and there I was, sitting in Hollywood just waiting for somebody to want me."

=== 1980s ===
In the 1980s Strasberg's credits included Bloody Birthday (1981); The Love Boat; Mazes and Monsters (1982); Sweet Sixteen (1983); The Returning (1983); The New Mike Hammer; Tales of the Unexpected; Tales from the Darkside; The Delta Force (1986); Remington Steele; Hot Shots; Murder, She Wrote; Cagney & Lacey; and The Runnin' Kind (1989).

"I love acting", she said in 1983. "I mean, I can't quite conceive of not doing it. But it's less important to me since I started writing, because I really like writing. And I really enjoy, I love lecturing and speaking and having that kind of contact with people too."

Her last performances included the action movie Prime Suspect (1989) with Frank Stallone, the biopic Schweitzer (1990), and Il giardino dei ciliegi (1992).

In 1993 she was a jury member for the 43rd Berlin International Film Festival.

== Writing ==
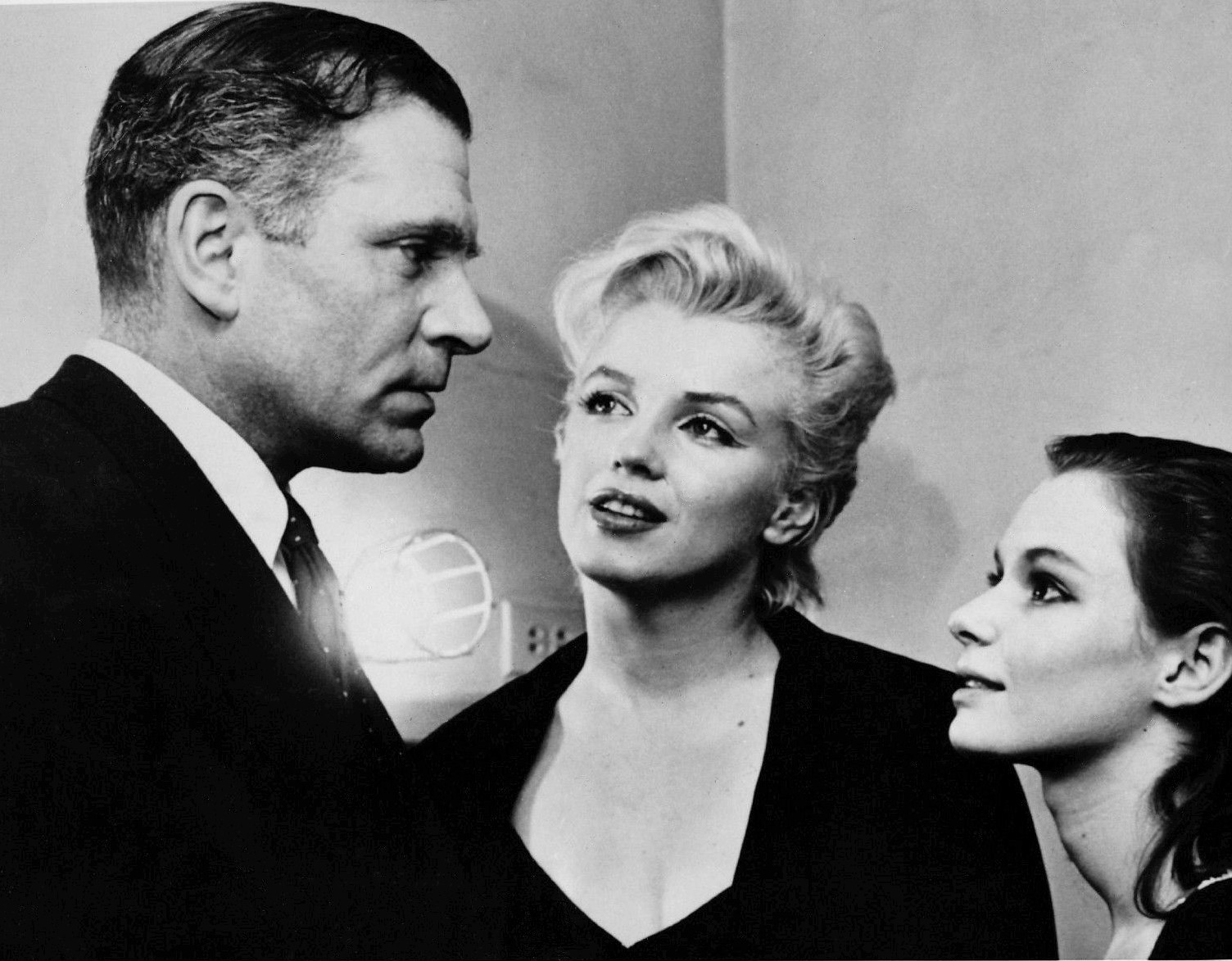
Laurence Olivier and Marilyn Monroe visit Strasberg backstage at The Diary of Anne Frank.

Strasberg wrote two best-selling books. Bittersweet was an autobiography in which she wrote about her tumultuous relationships with her parents and with actors Richard Burton and Christopher Jones, as well as with her own daughter's struggles with a heart defect. She received a $100,000 advance for it and sold paperback rights for $300,000.

Marilyn and Me: Sisters, Rivals, Friends (1992) was about Strasberg's friendship with Marilyn Monroe, whom she called a "surrogate sister" and a "member" of the Strasberg family for many years.

At the time of her death, Strasberg was working on a third book about her personal spiritual journey entitled Confessions of a New Age Heretic.

== Personal life ==
Before her marriage, Strasberg had relationships with Warren Beatty, Cary Grant, and Richard Burton.

On September 25, 1965, in Las Vegas, Strasberg married actor Christopher Jones, with whom she had appeared in an episode of The Legend of Jesse James. Their daughter, Jennifer Robin, was born six months later. The couple divorced in 1968 due to her husband's mental instability. Jennifer was born with a congenital birth defect, which Strasberg blamed on her and Jones's drug-taking.

== Death ==
In the mid-1990s Strasberg was diagnosed with breast cancer. Although believed to be in remission, she died of the disease at her home in New York City on January 21, 1999, at age 60.

== Filmography and television ==
- "Catch a Falling Star" (1953) - episode of Goodyear Playhouse
- "Romeo and Juliet" - episode of Kraft Theatre
- The Cobweb (1955) as Sue Brett
- Picnic (1955) as Millie Owens
- 1955 Motion Picture Theatre Celebration (1955) (short subject)
- Stage Struck (1958) as Eva Lovelace
- Kapò (1960) as Edith, alias Nicole Niepas
- Taste of Fear (1961) as Penny Appleby
- Disorder (1962) as Isabella
- Hemingway's Adventures of a Young Man (1962) as Rosanna
- The Shortest Day (1962) (uncredited)
- The High Bright Sun (1965) as Juno Kozani
- The Invaders, "Quantity Unknown" (Season 1: Episode 9, 1967) as Diane Oberly
- The Big Valley (1967, Episode: "Night in a Small Town") as Sally
- The F.B.I. (1967, Episode: "The Executioners") as Chris Roland
- Chubasco (1968) as Bunny
- The Trip (1967) as Sally Groves
- Psych-Out (1968) as Jenny Davis
- The Name of the Game Is Kill! (1968) as Mickey Terry
- Bonanza (1968, Episode: "A Severe Case Of Matrimony") as Rosalita
- The Brotherhood (1968) as Emma Ginetta
- The Sisters (1969) as Martha
- Sweet Hunters (1969) as Lis
- The Virginian (1970, Episode: "Crooked Corner") as Clara Hansch
- McCloud (1970-1971) as Annette Bardege / Lorraine
- Sammy Somebody (1971)
- Night Gallery (1971–1973, 2 episodes) as Sheila Trent / Ruth Asquith (segment "Midnight Never Ends")
- The Sixth Sense (TV series) (1972: Once Upon a Chilling")
- The Legend of Hillbilly John (1972) as Polly Wiltse
- Frankenstein (1973) as Elizabeth Lavenza
- Toma (1973) as Patty Toma (series regular; 23 episodes)
- And Millions Will Die (1973) as Heather Kessler
- The Rockford Files (1974, Episode: "The Countess") as Deborah Ryder
- So Evil, My Sister (1974) as Brenda
- McMillan and Wife (1974) as Virginia Ryan
- Harry O (1976, Episode: "Past Imperfect") as Sara Webber
- The Rockford Files (1976, Episode: "A Bad Deal In The Valley") as Karen Stiles
- The Stronger (1976, Short)
- Rollercoaster (1977) as Fran
- Tre soldi e la donna di classe (1977)
- The Manitou (1978) as Karen Tandy
- In Praise of Older Women (1978) as Bobbie
- The Immigrants (1978) as Sarah Levy
- $weepstake$ (1979, Episode: "Roscoe, Elizabeth, and the M.C.") as Beverly
- Beggarman, Thief (1979) as Ida Cohen
- Acting: Lee Strasberg and the Actors Studio (1981, Documentary)
- Bloody Birthday (1981) as Miss Viola Davis
- Mazes and Monsters (1982) as Meg
- Sweet Sixteen (1982) as Joanne Morgan
- The Returning (1983) as Sybil Ophir
- Tales of the Unexpected (1984–1985, TV Series) as Roberta Elton / Madame Myra
- Tales from the Darkside (1985) as artist Kate in episode "Effect and Cause"
- The Delta Force (1986) as Debra Levine (Passenger)
- Remembering Marilyn (1987, Documentary)
- Murder, She Wrote (1987, Episode: "The Days Dwindle Down") as Dorothy Hearn Davis
- Marilyn Monroe: Beyond the Legend (1987, Documentary)
- The Runnin' Kind (1989) as Carol Curtis
- Prime Suspect (1989) as Dr. Celia Warren
- Schweitzer (1990) as Helene Schweitzer
- The Cherry Orchard (1992) as Livia
- Love, Marilyn (2012, Documentary)
- The Other Side of the Wind (2018; shot between 1970 and 1976) as Juliette Riche

== Awards and nominations ==
Year	Award	Category	Production	Result
1956	Tony Award	Best Actress in a Play	The Diary of Anne Frank	Nominated
1956	Theatre World Award		The Diary of Anne Frank	Won
1957	BAFTA Film Award	Most Promising Newcomer to Film	Picnic	Nominated
1961	Mar de Plata Film Festival	Best Actress	Kapò	Won
1963	Golden Globe	Best Actress – Drama	Hemingway's Adventures of a Young Man	Nominated
