= Edward Hume =

American film and television writer (1936–2023)

- Born: May 18, 1936; Chicago, Illinois, U.S.
- Died: July 13, 2023 (aged 87)
- Occupation: Screenwriter
- Notable works: The Day After

Edward Chalmers Hume (May 18, 1936 – July 13, 2023) was an American film and television writer, best known for creating and developing several TV series in the 1970s, and for writing the 1983 TV movie The Day After.

== TV series ==
During the 1970s Hume wrote the pilot scripts for four television series: Cannon (which ran on CBS for five seasons), Barnaby Jones (CBS, eight seasons), The Streets of San Francisco (ABC, five seasons), and Toma (ABC, one season). During the week of April 21, 1974, all four series appeared together in the Nielsen top twenty ratings.

== The Day After ==
In 1981, ABC Motion Pictures approached Hume about writing a screenplay on nuclear warfare, placing no restrictions on the subject, except to show "what nuclear war would be like." The script focused not on politics or military decision-makers, but on a small group of average citizens in the American heartland – teachers, farmers, doctors, students – who live among unseen ICBM missile silos in nearby cornfields. Early in the story, there is background news-chatter of mounting tension between the United States and the Soviet Union, but it is intentionally left unclear who fires the first missile.

The Day After was a cultural and media phenomenon, watched by 100 million people on the night of Sunday, November 20, 1983. Immediately following the movie, ABC aired a special Viewpoint program hosted by Ted Koppel to discuss its impact. Among the participants were Henry Kissinger, Robert McNamara, Carl Sagan, William F. Buckley, Elie Wiesel, and Secretary of State George P. Shultz. In his diaries, President Reagan noted that the film was "powerfully done, very effective...and left me greatly depressed." Eventually, The Day After was released in theaters around the world, and aired on Soviet television; the screenplay was nominated for an Emmy Award, and won the Writers Guild of America Award for Best Original Drama Anthology. In 2023, Hume won the Future of Life Award for reducing the risk of nuclear war through the power of storytelling.

== Other TV and feature films ==
In addition to the feature film screenplays for Summertree (1971), A Reflection of Fear (1972) and Two-Minute Warning (1976), Hume wrote the TV movies The Harness (1971), Sweet Hostage (1973) and 21 Hours in Munich (1976), dramatizing the events surrounding the Black September terrorist attack on Israeli athletes during the 1972 Summer Olympics.

The Terry Fox Story (1983) – the initial production of HBO Films—told the story of the young athlete who lost a leg to cancer, yet ran on a prosthesis across Canada promoting the Marathon of Hope, raising money for cancer research. The film won the Genie Award for Best Motion Picture, Canada's equivalent of the Oscar. Common Ground (1990), based on the Pulitzer Prize winning book by J. Anthony Lukas, revisited the turbulence of the Boston busing crisis of 1976 through the lives of three families. The teleplay won the 1990 Humanitas Prize.

== Death ==
Hume died on July 13, 2023, at the age of 87.
