= Susan Denberg =

German-Austrian model and actress

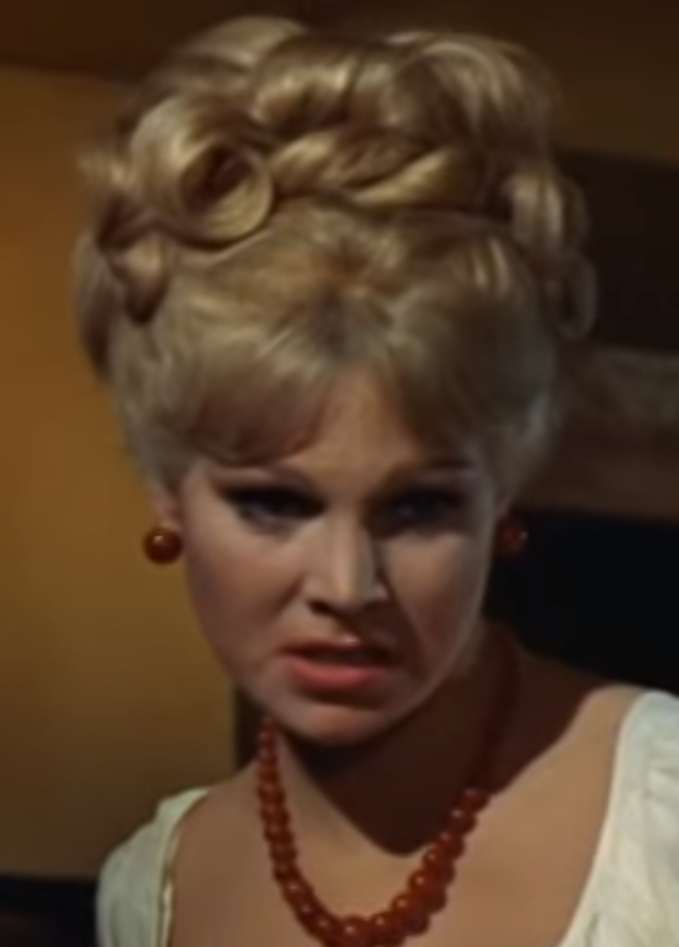
- Denberg in Frankenstein Created Woman
- Born: Dietlinde Zechner; 2 August 1944 (age 81); Bad Polzin, Pomerania, Germany (present-day Polczyn-Zdrój, Zachodniopomorskie, Poland)
- Other name: Dietlinde Scotti
- Occupations: Actress, playmate, model, dancer
- Spouse: Anthony Scotti (m. 1965; div. 1968)

Playboy centerfold appearance
- August 1966
- Preceded by: Tish Howard
- Succeeded by: Dianne Chandler

Susan Denberg (born Dietlinde Zechner; 2 August 1944) is a German-Austrian model and actress. Denberg has appeared on stage and in film, notably in Frankenstein Created Woman (1967) and other roles in the 1960s.

== Early life ==
Denberg was born in Bad Polzin, Germany (now Połczyn-Zdrój, Poland) and raised in Klagenfurt, Austria.

== Career ==
Zechner adopted Susan Denberg as a stage name. She became a chorus dancer and 1966 Playboy playmate (Miss August). In addition, she did stage and dancing in London and Las Vegas.

In 1966, she appeared in the Star Trek episode, "Mudd's Women" (1966). Denberg's best known acting role was in the Hammer horror film, Frankenstein Created Woman (1967), opposite Peter Cushing. However, Denberg's voice in the film was dubbed, as her Austrian accent was considered too strong.

After Frankenstein Created Woman, Denberg left Hollywood and returned to Austria. Thereafter, for many years sources incorrectly reported that she had died in the late 1960s, either accidentally or through suicide. In an interview published in the July 22, 1968 edition of 'Midnight' magazine titled "LSD Wrecked My Life", Denberg admitted that since returning to Austria she had fallen into a life of alcohol and drugs, including LSD. After the birth of her son in 1971 Denberg worked as a topless waitress at an adult cinema in Vienna and later as a dancer at a Vienna nightclub called Renz. She also worked in Geneva, Switzerland.

== Personal life ==
Denberg married Anthony Scotti in 1965 in Las Vegas, and divorced in 1968. She had a son in 1971; the father was of Yugoslav descent. After the birth of her second child in 1976, she retired from nude dancing and, as Dietlinde Scotti, resided in the tenth district of Vienna, Austria.

== Filmography ==
Year	Title	Role	Notes
1966	12 O'Clock High	Mitzi	Episode: "Back to the Drawing Board"
1966	The Wackiest Ship in the Army	Maria	Episode: "My Island"
1966	An American Dream	Ruta	Film (aka "See You in Hell, Darling")
1966	Star Trek	Magda	S1:E6, "Mudd's Women"
1967	Frankenstein Created Woman	Christina Cleeve	Hammer film

Judy Tyler	Melinda Windsor	Priscilla Wright	Karla Conway	Dolly Read	Kelly Burke
Tish Howard	Susan Denberg	Dianne Chandler	Linda Moon	Lisa Baker	Susan Bernard
