= Bill Wistrom =

American sound editor

- Born: December 20, 1935; Los Angeles, California, U.S.
- Died: March 10, 2010 (aged 74); Santa Clarita, California, U.S.
- Occupation: Sound editor

Bill Wistrom (December 20, 1935 – March 10, 2010) was an American sound editor. He won six Primetime Emmy Awards and was nominated for eleven more in the category Outstanding Sound Editing for his work on the television programs Falcon Crest, Fresno, Star Trek: The Next Generation, Star Trek: Deep Space Nine, Star Trek: Voyager and Star Trek: Enterprise, and also the television films Friendly Fire, Evita Peron, The Capture of Grizzly Adams, Inside the Third Reich and Flight 90: Disaster on the Potomac.

In 2008, Wistrom was awarded the MPSE Career Achievement Award by the Motion Picture Sound Editors.

Wistrom died on March 10, 2010, in Santa Clarita, California, at the age of 74.
