= Who Fears the Devil? =

- Dust-jacket illustration by Lee Brown Coye for Who Fears the Devil?
- Author: Manly Wade Wellman
- Cover artist: Lee Brown Coye
- Language: English
- Genre: Fantasy, horror
- Publisher: Arkham House
- Publication date: 1963
- Publication place: United States
- Media type: Print (hardback)
- Pages: 213

Who Fears the Devil? is a collection of fantasy and horror short stories by American author Manly Wade Wellman. It was released in 1963 by Arkham House in an edition of 2,058 copies and was Wellman's only book released by Arkham House. The collection consists of all of Wellman's Silver John stories that had been published at the time. They had all previously appeared in The Magazine of Fantasy & Science Fiction. Wellman contributed new short sketches to the collection. The book is dedicated to Wellman's friend, the North Carolina folkorist and musician Bascom Lamar Lunsford.

Darrell Schweitzer has described the book as a classic of fantasy literature, stating Who Fears The Devil? "has genuinely enriched the field because of its unique subject matter and Wellman's heartfelt enthusiasm for it".

== Contents ==
Who Fears the Devil? contains eleven short stories, each preceded by a "sketch" about half a page in length and with no obvious connection to the stories preceding and following it.

	Sketch	Story
1	John's My Name	O Ugly Bird!
2	Why They're Named That	One Other
3	Then I Wasn't Alone	Shiver in the Pines
4	You Know the Tale of Hoph	Old Devlins Was A-Waiting
5	Find the Place Yourself	The Desrick on Yandro
6	The Stars Down There	Vandy, Vandy
7	Blue Monkey	Dumb Supper
8	I Can't Claim That	The Little Black Train
9	Who Else Could I Count On	Walk Like a Mountain
10	None Wiser for the Trip	On the Hills and Everywhere
11	Nary Spell	Nine Yards of Other Cloth

== Sources ==
- Jaffery, Sheldon (1989). The Arkham House Companion. Mercer Island, WA: Starmont House, Inc. p. 67. ISBN 1-55742-005-X.
- Chalker, Jack L.; Mark Owings (1998). The Science-Fantasy Publishers: A Bibliographic History, 1923-1998. Westminster, MD and Baltimore: Mirage Press, Ltd. p. 40.
- Joshi, S.T. (1999). Sixty Years of Arkham House: A History and Bibliography. Sauk City, WI: Arkham House. pp. 80–81. ISBN 0-87054-176-5.
- Nielsen, Leon (2004). Arkham House Books: A Collector's Guide. Jefferson, NC and London: McFarland & Company, Inc. p. 88. ISBN 0-7864-1785-4.
