= Mudd's Women =

- Star Trek: The Original Series episode
- Roger C. Carmel as Harry Mudd (1966) This file has been proposed for deletion and may be deleted after Thursday, 26 November 2026. Click on file page link to object.
- Episode no.: Season 1 Episode 6
- Directed by: Harvey Hart
- Story by: Gene Roddenberry
- Teleplay by: Stephen Kandel
- Cinematography by: Jerry Finnerman
- Production code: 4
- Original air date: October 13, 1966

Guest appearances
- Roger C. Carmel – Leo Walsh / Harry Mudd; Karen Steele – Eve McHuron; Susan Denberg – Magda Kovacs; Maggie Thrett – Ruth Bonaventure; Gene Dynarski – Ben Childress; John Kowal – Herm Gossett; Seamon Glass – Benton; Jim Goodwin – Farrell; Jerry Foxworth – Guard

Episode chronology
← Previous "The Enemy Within"	Next → "What Are Little Girls Made Of?"
- Star Trek: The Original Series season 1

"Mudd's Women" is the seventh episode of the first season of the American science fiction television series Star Trek. Written by Stephen Kandel, based on a story by Gene Roddenberry, and directed by Harvey Hart, it first aired on October 13, 1966.

In the episode, the Enterprise pursues a vessel and rescues its occupants Harry Mudd, an interstellar con man, and the three mysteriously beautiful women he is transporting to become the wives of settlers.

This is the first of two episodes of the original series to feature Harry Mudd. He also appears in "I, Mudd", the animated series (TAS) episode "Mudd's Passion", and in Star Trek: Discovery, as a recurring character.

== Plot ==
The USS Enterprise, under the command of Captain Kirk, is in pursuit of an unregistered cargo spaceship. The ship overloads its engines in an escape attempt through an asteroid field. Kirk orders Enterprise's shields extended around the other spacecraft to protect it until its occupants can be transported aboard Enterprise. This action severely strains the Enterprise's systems and destroys all but one of the lithium crystal circuits in the Enterprise's warp engines. (Note: In later episodes warp engines are powered by dilithium crystals rather than lithium crystals. The in-universe relation of a lithium crystal to a dilithium crystal has never been explained.)

The Enterprise beams the cargo ship's three passengers and captain aboard, just as an asteroid impact destroys their spaceship. In the transporter room, the captain gives his name as Leo Walsh. The three women who accompany him are stunningly beautiful, and they distract the male crew members of the Enterprise, excluding Mr. Spock, whose Vulcan heritage makes him immune to female charms. The women are intended as wives for settlers on the planet Ophiuchus III and are introduced as Ruth Bonaventure, Eve McHuron, and Magda Kovacs. All three signed on with Walsh to escape a situation in which their marriage prospects were slim or non-existent.

Kirk convenes a hearing, during which the computer contradicts Walsh's testimony, reporting that his ship master's license has been revoked and forcing him to reveal his true name, Harcourt Fenton Mudd, a criminal with an extensive record. The hearing ends as the final lithium crystal fails.

Without lithium crystals, the Enterprise must limp on reserve power to the storm-plagued planet Rigel XII to obtain new crystals from the miners there. Ben Childress, the chief miner, having been in contact with Mudd, demands his release along with the women in exchange for the crystals. The Enterprise's remaining power is insufficient to maintain the ship's orbit for more than a few days, threatening a fiery reentry into the planet's atmosphere, so Kirk is forced to allow Mudd and the women to beam down to the planet. However, once there Childress reneges on the deal.

At an impromptu party with the three miners, Eve becomes angry when they begin fighting over the other two women, and runs away into a magnetic dust storm, with Childress and Kirk in pursuit. Kirk beams back to the Enterprise to try to locate them from orbit. Childress finds Eve, brings her to his quarters, and falls asleep. On waking, he is confronted with a much plainer Eve.

Kirk and Mudd beam back down to the planet to deal with Childress. The captain reveals that Mudd has been giving the women the Venus Drug, which creates a transient, illusory beauty, and that the other two miners have already been married to Ruth and Magda. As Childress confronts Mudd over the deception, Eve snatches a dose of what appears to be the Venus Drug, but is in fact a placebo. This restores her self-confidence to the point that Childress finds her as attractive as before. Pleased, he gives Kirk the replacement crystals. Kirk offers to take Eve away with him but she opts to stay with Childress. Eve tells Kirk, "You've got someone up there called the Enterprise." The ship continues on its way, with Mudd in custody.

== Production ==
The story was one of three submitted for production as the second pilot of Star Trek, the others being "The Omega Glory" and the selected episode, "Where No Man Has Gone Before". It was filmed as the second episode of the first season, after "The Corbomite Maneuver".

Gene Roddenberry told Stephen Kandel he wanted a swashbuckling character as the guest lead. Several weeks later Kandel presented his idea, "Mudd's Women", and started to write the script but disliked that Roddenberry repeatedly rewrote it. Roddenberry took credit for the story when screen credits were submitted to the Writers Guild for approval; Roddenberry had written a story outline for "Mudd's Women" as early as July 1964, long before Kandel's involvement with the show.

== Reception ==
Zack Handlen of The A.V. Club gave the episode an 'A' rating, describing the character of Harry Mudd in particular as "a familiar character type, but an enjoyable one".

In 2015, Wired suggested this episode was skippable in their binge-watching guide for the original series.

In 2016, TVLine ranked Eve finding out Kirk had given her a placebo rather than the beauty pill as number 13 on the top twenty moments of Star Trek: The Original Series.
