= Hedge and Donna =

American folk and folk-rock duo

- Also known as: Capers and Carson
- Origin: Whittier, California, U.S.
- Genres: Folk
- Years active: 1967–1973
- Labels: Capitol, Polydor, Janus
- Past members: Hedge Capers; Donna Carson

Hedge and Donna were an American folk and folk-rock duo comprising Keene Hedge Capers (born February 21, 1945) and Donna Marie Carson (November 13, 1946 – November 21, 2019). They recorded six albums between 1968 and 1973. On their final album they were credited as Capers and Carson.

== Career ==
Capers was born in Princeton, New Jersey, and Carson in McAlester, Oklahoma. They met when both were students at Whittier College in California. In early 1967 they began performing together, both singing with Capers on guitar and bass, and they married in San Diego later that year. They played the amateur night at the Troubadour in West Hollywood, and as a result club owner Doug Weston became their manager. In early 1968, a Billboard reviewer described them as "a class act ... combining expert harmonizing and strong vocal prowess", and they attracted attention as a mixed race duo. They signed to Capitol Records and their debut album, Hedge and Donna (sometimes known as Love, a title used on the record label but not the cover), appeared in 1968, followed later the same year by Hedge & Donna 2. Both albums were produced by Nick Venet, and contained some self-penned songs with others by Woodstock singer-songwriter Billy Batson, Donovan, Tim Buckley, Nina Simone, and Jackson Browne.

The pair played the Philadelphia Folk Festival in 1968, 1969 and 1970. They appeared on the front cover of Jet magazine in March 1969, with the magazine describing them as working "the gamut of songs from blues and soul to spirituals and folk." They released their third album, All the Friendly Colours, again produced by Venet and with arrangements by James E. Bond, in the same year. As well as in Los Angeles, they appeared in nightclubs in Washington D.C., New York City, Boston, San Francisco and elsewhere, and appeared on The Smothers Brothers Comedy Hour. In 1970, they issued Special Circumstances, with Janis Ian playing on the pair's performance of her song "He's a Rainbow", and they were among the performers at the Atlanta International Pop Festival in July 1970. Capers and Carson then moved to Polydor Records, releasing Evolution in 1971. The album sleeve showed the title as Revolution with the initial "R" struck through. Their final album, Capers and Carson, was issued on the Janus label in 1973.

Capers appeared as a folk singer in the 1973 movie Who Fears the Devil?, later edited and reissued as The Legend of Hillbilly John. The couple had a child, Ethan, in 1972. Capers and Carson divorced in 1976.

Carson later worked with special needs children at the California State Diagnostic School, and as a child advocate supervisor for Los Angeles County courts. She died on November 21, 2019, aged 73.

== Discography ==
=== Albums ===
- Hedge and Donna (a.k.a. Love) (Capitol ST-2869, February 1968)
- Hedge & Donna 2 (Capitol ST-107, September 1968)
- All the Friendly Colours (Capitol ST-279, August 1969)
- Special Circumstances (Capitol ST-447, May 1970)
- Evolution (Polydor 24–4063, June 1971)
- Capers and Carson (Janus JLS-3045, April 1973)

=== Singles ===
- "Tomorrow Is The 1st Day of the Rest of My Life" / "Black Betty" (Capitol 2695, 1969)
- "My God And I" / "Sunshine" (Capitol 2840, 1970)
- "Touch Caste on the Water" / "She Said She Said" (Polydor PD 2–14090, 1971)
- "Guava Jelly" / "Well I Never" (Janus J-216, 1973)
- "Mirror Mirror" / "(Something's Really) Got A Hold on Me" (Janus J-229, 1973)
