= Daffy Duck and Porky Pig Meet the Groovie Goolies =

1972 American television film directed by Hal Sutherland

- Genre: Adventure; Comedy
- Written by: Chuck Menville; Len Janson
- Directed by: Hal Sutherland
- Voices of: Mel Blanc; Jane Webb; Howard Morris; Larry Storch; Jay Scheimer; Lou Scheimer; Dallas McKennon
- Country of origin: United States
- Original language: English

Production
- Producers: Norm Prescott; Lou Scheimer
- Running time: 1 hour
- Production companies: Filmation; Warner Bros. Television

Original release
- Network: ABC
- Release: December 16, 1972

Related
- The Red Baron; Luvcast U.S.A.

Daffy Duck and Porky Pig Meet the Groovie Goolies is a 1972 American animated one-hour television movie (with a live-action segment near the end) that was broadcast on ABC on December 16, as an episode of the anthology series The ABC Saturday Superstar Movie. In this Filmation-produced movie, Daffy Duck, Porky Pig, and other Looney Tunes characters interact with the characters from the Filmation series Groovie Goolies.

This movie is notable for being the one and only time that Warner Bros. Television "loaned out" their famous Looney Tunes characters to appear in a Filmation production, as Warner Bros. had shut down their animation studio in 1969; producer and Filmation founder Lou Scheimer had previously worked for the studio.

== Plot ==
Daffy Duck is in Hollywood producing a movie about King Arthur and the Knights of the Round Table, starring himself; also appearing in the film are Porky Pig, Petunia Pig (in her first on-screen appearance since the 1930s), Sylvester, Tweety, Wile E. Coyote (without his usual foil the Road Runner), Pepé Le Pew, Elmer Fudd, Yosemite Sam, Foghorn Leghorn, and Charlie Dog. (Bugs Bunny, the usual foil of Elmer and Sam, was absent.)

At Horrible Hall, the Groovie Goolies are watching a television interview in which Daffy is talking about his new movie, when their program is interrupted by a ghoulish being calling himself The Phantom of the Flickers; he announces his intention to destroy every film that Daffy Duck and the company ever made, including their current King Arthur film. Being a huge fan of Daffy, Frankie goes to Hollywood to offer his help, and the other Horrible Hall residents go along with him.

Mayhem ensues when the Looney Tunes and the Goolies first meet, but they eventually settle down and continue filming the movie. But when the Phantom disguises himself as each of the Goolies, Daffy and the others then think that they are in league with the Phantom and run off. The Phantom suddenly grabs the film and, disguised as Hauntleroy, tries to escape from the Goolies by running through a magic mirror into "Mad Mirror Land" (where the animation shifts to live action, stop-motion pixilation). Frankie, Drac, and Wolfie chase after him, and after a cartoonishly slapstick pursuit they bring (or more rather sneeze) the Phantom and the film back to the hand-drawn animated world.

The Phantom turns out to be Drac's long-lost uncle Claude Chaney, a formerly famous silent film actor. Chaney's pale complexion left him out of work when color films became popular. Daffy, impressed with Chaney's disguise skills, gives Claude a job. King Arthur wins an Ozzie Award, and the Goolies head for home.

== Cast ==
=== Voice actors ===
- Mel Blanc . . . Daffy Duck, Porky Pig, Elmer Fudd, Yosemite Sam, Sylvester the Cat, Tweety, Wile E. Coyote, Pepé Le Pew, Foghorn Leghorn
- Joanne Louise ... Petunia Pig
- Howard Morris . . . Franklin "Frankie" Frankenstein, Wolfgang "Wolfie" Wolfman, Mummy, "Hauntleroy"
- Larry Storch . . . Count Tom Dracula, Hagatha, Claude Chaney/Phantom of the Flickers, Charlie Dog, Marshall Actor, Messenger, Singing Telegram Horse, Announcer, Joust Horses
- Jay Scheimer (uncredited) . . . Petunia Pig, Nurse
- Lou Scheimer (uncredited) . . . Director, Lance, Herald
- Hey Hey (uncredited) . . . Dogs
- Dallas McKennon (uncredited) . . . Sylvester the Cat (meowing sounds)

=== Live actors ===
The following (uncredited) actors appeared in the live-action segment:

- Ed Fournier . . . Franklin "Frankie" Frankenstein
- Emory Gordy Jr. . . . "Hauntleroy"
- Dick Monda . . . Count Tom Dracula
- Jeffrey Thomas . . . Wolfgang "Wolfie" Wolfman

== Production ==
In early 1971, Warner Bros. Television signed a long-term contract with Filmation under which the latter would produce new animated films and future television series based on Warner Bros.' existing properties, and the former would handle distribution off-network across the world. The deal also called for production of new theatrical cartoons by Filmation for distribution by Warner Bros. to theaters and television. Warner Bros. subsidiary Licensing Corp. of America would continue to exclusively represent both companies' properties for character licensing and merchandising. In early November, a television series based on Wile E. Coyote and Road Runner was announced to be in the works, but was never produced. In January 1972, Warner Bros. announced an expansion on the agreement, with a three-year series of animated feature films called Family Classics, each budgeted at $1 million and set at 90 minutes and announced as a co-production. They would hold network and syndication rights. The titles announced for the series included Treasure Island, Oliver Twist, Cyrano De Bergerac, Swiss Family Robinson, Don Quixote, From the Earth to the Moon, Robin Hood, Noah's Ark, Knights of the Round Table, Arabian Nights, and Jack London's Call of the Wild.

According to Lou Scheimer, Daffy Duck and Porky Pig Meet the Groovie Goolies was the strangest project that came from the contract. Chuck Menville and Len Janson were hired to write the film's story, where the Groovie Goolies go to Hollywood to meet Warner Bros.' Looney Tunes characters. Warner Bros. had shut down their animation department in 1969, so Filmation obtained the rights to use most of the main Looney Tunes characters, except Bugs Bunny (who had not been seen since the closure of the Warner Bros. studio in 1964), Speedy Gonzales and the Road Runner. Mel Blanc reprised several of his roles for the film, though the characters sounded a little different from the classic shorts; Filmation incorrectly sped up Blanc's voice recordings for Daffy Duck and Tweety higher than normal, with the former sounding like his early "screwball" incarnation by Tex Avery and Bob Clampett, and forgot to speed up Porky Pig's voice. Elmer Fudd, Sylvester the Cat, Foghorn Leghorn, and Pepé Le Pew's voices sounded deeper than usual, due to Blanc's dissatisfaction about working on the film and him struggling to get Elmer's voice "right" (Elmer's normal voice actor, Arthur Q. Bryan, had died in 1959); Wile E. Coyote communicated primarily by way of messages printed on signs as he did during the Road Runner shorts but occasionally uttered a laugh akin to the one he used in his appearances as a "super genius" against Bugs. Yosemite Sam is the only character who does not sound different from the classic shorts. Larry Storch and Howard Morris reprised their roles as Drac, Hagatha (Storch), Frankie, Wolfie, Mummy and Hauntleroy (Morris). The villain of the film, the Phantom of the Flickers, was a parody of The Phantom of the Opera, voiced by Storch, with the name "Claude Chaney" derived from Lon Chaney, Sr. (who played the title role in the 1925 film) and Claude Rains (who starred in the 1943 film). Additional voices were provided by Storch, Scheimer, and his wife Jay Scheimer (as Petunia Pig and the Nurse). Most of the Warner Bros. characters were drawn well (veteran Warner Bros. animator Virgil Ross was working there at the time, along with other animators that had worked for Warner Bros. in the late 1960s, such as Laverne Harding and Ed Solomon), though Wile E. and Pepé were drawn scruffier than usual.

The live-action segment was filmed in Westlake Village near Thousand Oaks, using stop motion, pixilation and undercranking to enable the actors to move like cartoon characters. Menville and Janson had previously used the techniques for three short films of their own: Stop Look and Listen, Blaze Glory and Sergeant Swell of the Mounties. The actors were music producer Ed Fournier as Frankie, musician Emory Gordy Jr. as "Hauntleroy", Dick Monda as Drac, and songwriter Jeffrey Thomas as Wolfie. The segment was a modified version of an unused segment for Sabrina and the Groovie Goolies, named "The Haunted Heist", in which the Goolies chase the real Hauntleroy into Mad Mirror Land after the latter steals Wolfie's guitar. It would later air in reruns in 1975 and as part of the syndicated The Groovie Goolies and Friends anthology series in 1978.

After Filmation produced the film, as well as Oliver Twist and Treasure Island (both of which had been finished by late 1973), Warner Bros. was unhappy with the quality of the film, and decided to drop the Family Classics line, due to a negative test screening for Oliver Twist.

== Reception ==
The special is not liked by many Looney Tunes fans due to its limited animation and weak storyline. In That's All, Folks! The Art of Warner Bros. Animation, Steve Schneider dismissed the film as "a low moment in Warner's animation; the less said about this work, the better". Animation historian Jerry Beck called the film "the low point in the history of animation" and "an abominable mess, with limited animation, voices sped up incorrectly and an annoying laugh track (not to mention the bland stock background music)". Michael N. Salda called it "the worst Arthurian cartoon ever" in his book Arthurian Animation: A Study of Cartoon Camelots on Film and Television, stating:

Even an all-star cast could not overcome Daffy Duck and Porky Pig Meet the Groovie Goolies's pedestrian draftsmanship, inconsistent voices, humorless gags, stock music loops, and empty characterization. The two segments devoted directly to Daffy's King Arthur film are no better than the rest of the cartoon that encompasses them. It is painful to watch. If the rest of the cartoon were any better, one could argue that Daffy's producer/director/actor effort is supposed to be deeply flawed, as it is, for example, in Daffy Duck in Hollywood, Hollywood Daffy and The Scarlet Pumpernickel. These three earlier cartoons were fine Warner Bros. releases that entertained even as, and because, they underscored Daffy's arrogance and many foibles. But Daffy's embedded King Arthur film is as unrelentingly weak as Daffy Duck and Porky Pig Meet the Groovie Goolies itself. There is no joke here. Despite the conclusion that shows Daffy proudly accepting an 'Ozzie' for King Arthur and making a speech in which he thanks himself repeatedly as producer, director, star, et cetera, the rest of the world took a dimmer view of Filmation's cartoon. Although the Phantom of the Flickers was speaking exclusively of Daffy's Arthurian film when he judged it a 'full-length flop', his condemnation could easily be extended to Daffy Duck and Porky Pig Meet the Groovie Goolies and much of Arthurianimation in the 1960s and early 1970s as a whole.

Harry McCracken of Animato! criticized the special's "extremely limited animation, tinny music, and almost constant laugh track" and the "weird" live-action sequence, and described Mel Blanc's voice acting as "alarmingly off", but praised the Looney Tunes characters' "faithfully drawn" likenesses.

The Animaniacs episode "Back In Style" was loosely based on Warner Bros. "loaning out" the Looney Tunes characters to appear in the film, with Yakko, Wakko, and Dot being loaned off to limited animation television cartoons, including a parody of Filmation's Fat Albert and the Cosby Kids named Obese Orson.

== Availability ==
This movie has never been officially released on home video in the United States (due to various rights issues), but traders on the Internet have been recording and selling DVDs of this film, most of which were originally black-and-white kinescopes of the original broadcast.

Distributor Select Video released the film in a number of European countries, including Germany and Denmark. The German version of the movie was released in 1983 as Groovie Goolies: Muntere Monster in Hollywood ("Groovie Goolies: Groovie Goolies in Hollywood"), and re-released in 1986 as Duffy Duck und Co. ("Daffy Duck and Co."), and again in 1990 as Die Lustige Monster Show: Duffy Duck und Co. in Hollywood ("Groovie Goolies: Daffy Duck and Co. in Hollywood"). The original laugh track from the movie was removed for these releases. In January 1985, the movie was released in the UK as Groovie Ghouls. In those instances, the live-action sequence was replaced by an out-of-shot collision before rejoining the original animated sequence. The sequence in these releases was cut for time, as the German versions contained trailers for other Select Video titles. Another notable feature of the German and UK releases was that the Select Video ident was shorter, and had no jingle. In addition, the end credits were different, as they had to edit out the names of the actors in the live-action sequence which was not included, and also had other credits, presumably for Europe-based post-production at Select Video.

Despite the aforementioned rights issues, the film remains part of the Groovie Goolies syndication package (split into two half-hours), as of the mid-2000s, and has been rebroadcast several times on television. On January 1, 1983, the movie was broadcast on Antenne 2 in France as Les Croque-monstres à Hollywood ("Groovie Goolies in Hollywood"). Sky One broadcast the movie in the United Kingdom on July 4, 1992. USA Network broadcast the movie as a Halloween special in the mid-to-late 1990s shortly before it stopped broadcasting cartoons altogether. The movie was broadcast on German television as Monsterparty auf Schloß Blutenburg: Daffy Duck und das Phantom Der Seifenoper ("Groovie Goolies: Daffy Duck and the Phantom of the Flickers") in 2002, 2007 and 2013.
