= Robert April =

Fictional character

- Star Trek character
- First appearance: as Animated character: "The Counter-Clock Incident" (1974) (The Animated Series); Live-action appearance: "Strange New Worlds" (2022) (Strange New Worlds)
- Created by: John Culver
- Portrayed by: Adrian Holmes (2022)
- Voiced by: James Doohan (Star Trek: The Animated Series)

In-universe information
- Species: Human
- Gender: Male
- Affiliation: Starfleet
- Spouse: Sarah April

Robert April is a fictional character in the Star Trek media franchise. April was the USS Enterprise's first commanding officer, preceding Captain Christopher Pike.

The character first appeared in the Star Trek: The Animated Series episode "The Counter-Clock Incident" (1974), in which he is voiced by James Doohan. April's first live-action appearance was in the pilot episode of Star Trek: Strange New Worlds (2022), in which he is portrayed by Adrian Holmes.

== Development and casting ==
A prison chaplain named "Robert April" appears in two episodes of Have Gun – Will Travel (1957–63), for which Star Trek creator Gene Roddenberry wrote. The name stuck with Roddenberry, and "Robert M. April" commanded the starship Yorktown in his 1964 Star Trek proposal to CBS. The captain's name was changed to "Christopher Pike" when NBC accepted the Star Trek project later that year.

Fred Bronson (writing as John Culver) came up with the idea of the Enterprise having a captain who preceded Pike for "The Counter-Clock Incident". He selected the name "Robert April" from Roddenberry's original list of possible Enterprise captain names.

During the development of Star Trek: Strange New Worlds, Adrian Holmes submitted two taped auditions for the role. Producer Henry Alonso Myers said Holmes had the gravitas to play April, who is "mythic" by virtue of being the first captain of the Enterprise.

== Depiction ==
=== Television ===
==== Star Trek: The Animated Series (1974) ====
In "The Counter-Clock Incident", the Enterprise crew begins to rapidly age in reverse. The old age of Commodore April and his wife Sarah (voiced by Nichelle Nichols) affords them more time at maturity, allowing them to save the crew and undo the reverse aging process.

==== Star Trek: Strange New Worlds (2022) ====
In the pilot episode of Star Trek: Strange New Worlds, April (now an Admiral) orders Captain Pike, in command of the Enterprise, on a rescue mission. Although Pike violates General Order 1 on the mission, April uses his influence with Starfleet Command to keep Pike from being charged.

==== References ====
April is listed as one of Starfleet's most decorated officers in the Star Trek: Discovery episode "Choose Your Pain" (2017), along with Jonathan Archer, Matthew Decker ("The Doomsday Machine"), Philippa Georgiou, and Christopher Pike. In the second season's "Brother" (2019), Pike states that he was April's first officer aboard the Enterprise.

=== Literature ===
April appears in the novels Final Frontier (1988) and Best Destiny (1992) by Diane Carey as the captain of the Enterprise. Carey's version of April comes from Coventry, and he wears cardigan sweaters over his uniform due to a blood disorder that causes him to feel slightly chilly most of the time. Lacking a "live action" image of April, designer and author Michael Okuda created a collage of Roddenberry's head on William Shatner's body to illustrate April in The Star Trek Encyclopedia (1994). April is militaristic in the Star Trek: Early Voyages comics (1997–1998), and another timeline's version of April appears in a comic prologue to Star Trek Into Darkness, "Countdown to Darkness" (2013).

== Reception ==
Timothy Donohoo, writing for CBR.com, said Robert April "had elements of both Kirk and Pike", noting that he was heroic but also faced with self-doubt about his leadership. He said the character concept was "revolutionary in many ways" because "the idea of the hero doubting himself and questioning his own actions" was rare in that era's movie and television scripts.

"The Counter-Clock Incident" writer Fred Bronson thanked Adrian Holmes for "bring[ing April] to life" in Strange New Worlds. Michael Okuda, who created the photo-collage depiction of April for The Star Trek Encyclopedia, also commended Holmes's casting. Keith DeCandido said outcry over casting a dark-skinned actor as April, having been previously depicted with light skin in animation and print, "has served as a nice way of revealing the racists among Trek fans". Screen Rant said April's re-envisioning "does not disappoint" and is "part of the fun" of Strange New Worlds reiterating on 1960s-era Star Trek characters.
