= The Pirates of Orion =

- Star Trek: The Animated Series episode
- Episode no.: Season 2 Episode 1
- Directed by: Bill Reed
- Written by: Howard Weinstein
- Production code: 22020
- Original air date: September 7, 1974

Episode chronology
← Previous "The Jihad"	Next → "Bem"

"The Pirates of Orion" is the second season premiere episode of the American animated science fiction television series Star Trek: The Animated Series, the 17th episode overall. It first aired on September 7, 1974 on NBC. It was directed by Bill Reed and written by Howard Weinstein. The episode was Weinstein's first professional sale at the age of 19, making him, as of 2023, the youngest writer of any Star Trek TV episode.

Set in the 23rd century, the series follows the adventures of Captain James T. Kirk (voiced by William Shatner) and the crew of the Starfleet starship Enterprise. In this episode, Kirk and the Enterprise must contend with a pirate captain and crew who have stolen a load of cargo that includes medicine crucial to save a dying Spock (voiced by Leonard Nimoy).

The story was developed from Weinstein out of a Star Trek-based short story he had previously published in a school science fiction publication. After it failed to be read on the first submission, it was resubmitted and purchased by the production team. The episode featured the first appearance of male members of the Orion species in the Star Trek franchise; male Orions would not appear in a live action episode until 2004. Critical reception to the episode was mixed, and it has been released in several forms of home media, including VHS, LaserDisc and DVD.

== Plot ==
On stardate 6334.1, the Federation starship Enterprise is enroute to perform ceremonial duties on Deneb V when the Vulcan First Officer, Spock (voiced by Leonard Nimoy), contracts a disease called "choriocytosis". Chief Medical Officer Leonard McCoy (voiced by DeForest Kelley) notes that he can slow the disease, but Spock will still only have days to live. The Starfleet freighter Huron is set to rendezvous with the Enterprise and deliver medicine when it is attacked by Orion pirates who steal its cargo, which turns out to be primarily a sizable load of dilithium crystals.

The Enterprise follows back on the rendezvous course and finds the battered Huron and its surviving crew. Analysis of the attack leads Captain Kirk (voiced by William Shatner) and his crew to chase the Orion ship in a desperate attempt to recover the cure. The Orions, knowing they cannot escape the Enterprise or best them in a fight, plot to destroy both themselves and the Enterprise in order to preserve the lie of "Orion neutrality". Kirk meets with the Orion Captain (voiced by James Doohan) on a highly unstable asteroid. Kirk and the Enterprise crew realize that the Captain has explosives on his person and neutralize them in time. They recover the medicine to save Spock, capture the Orion Captain (who orders his crew not to commit suicide via self-destruction), and retrieve the dilithium crystals.

Spock's life is saved and the Enterprise continues on its original assignment, with Kirk reflecting on how the Orion Captain will stand trial for his actions and allow the Federation to solve the problem of "Orion neutrality".

== Production ==
Writer Howard Weinstein had been a fan of space exploration following the flight of NASA astronaut Alan Shepard on Mercury-Redstone 3. He recalled that his first experience of Star Trek was in middle school, where he mixed elements of the show with Lost in Space. He began watching the show and was inspired to write for television after reading The Making of Star Trek by Gene Roddenberry and Stephen E. Whitfield. While in the 11th grade, he had a Star Trek short story published in the fanzine Probe, which was a yearly publication in East Meadow High School. Weinstein also wrote a script for Mission: Impossible, but the script was turned down as it was not submitted via an agent. It was returned with a list of suggested agents, and his father recognised Bill Cooper's name on the list from their school years together.

Cooper agreed to take on Weinstein, who decided to redevelop his Probe-published short story into a script for the animated Star Trek. Cooper addressed the script to D.C. Fontana, who had recently left the show. When it arrived at the production office, it was forwarded, unread, to Fontana, who sent it back to Cooper as she had left the show. The script was subsequently resubmitted by Weinstein under his agent's name for the second season of the show. Producer Lou Scheimer contacted Weinstein and informed him that they wanted to purchase the script if the ending could be modified, to which Weinstein agreed. Weinstein was nineteen at the time, staying in the dormitory at the University of Connecticut, and Scheimer was surprised to find out that Weinstein was so young.

The script sold in April 1974. It was Weinstein's first professional sale and credit as a writer. He found out later that year that it would be used as the opening episode of the second season. Weinstein organized a get together in his dormitory to watch the episode when it aired, which some thirty people and a dog attended. After the script was used, Weinstein found that it enabled him to write the Star Trek novel The Covenant of the Crown for Pocket Books; he said in a later interview that it gave him "instant credibility" with the company. He also began to appear at science fiction conventions and later wrote several more Star Trek books and comic books. Weinstein received a "Thank You" credit on Star Trek IV: The Voyage Home after introducing that film's director, Leonard Nimoy, to the idea of including whales in the film.

This episode features the first appearance of male Orions. While a surgically altered agent who appeared as an Andorian in The Original Series episode "Journey to Babel" was speculated to be of Orion origin by Spock, the only members of the race which had previously been represented in Star Trek were the Orion slave girls. Male Orions would not be seen in a live action Star Trek production until 2004 with the episode "Borderland" in the fourth season of Star Trek: Enterprise.

== Reception ==
In Trek Navigator, a book by Mark A. Altman and Edward Gross which reviewed every episode and film of Star Trek up until 1998, Altman gave "The Pirates of Orion" a score of two out of four, while Gross gave a score of three out of four.

Michelle Erica Green watched the episode for the website TrekNation, saying that it included "precisely the sort of character interaction that made the original Star Trek such a success". Green felt that, given the ability of The Animated Series to show things that couldn't be seen in The Original Series due to budget restrictions, the Orions could have been featured more prominently, and that if the attack on the Huron had been shown instead of implied through dialogue, then it would have given "a stronger opinion as viewers of the relative evils of the Orions, whether they are an honorable enemy or mere vicious thugs."

A 2018 Star Trek binge-watching guide by Den of Geek, recommended this episode for featuring the trio of characters Kirk, Spock, and Bones of The Original Series.

== Home media release ==
"The Pirates of Orion" was released on VHS cassette alongside "The Practical Joker" during the initial release of tapes by Paramount Home Video in 1989. It has also been released on LaserDisc as part of the series set. The first release of Star Trek: The Animated Series on DVD was through fan made productions. The official DVD release was on November 21, 2006 in the United States, which was a single release containing all episodes from both seasons of the television show.
