= The Jihad =

- Star Trek: The Animated Series episode
- Episode no.: Season 1 Episode 16
- Directed by: Hal Sutherland
- Written by: Stephen Kandel
- Production code: 22014
- Original air date: January 12, 1974
- Running time: 23 minutes (runtime)

Guest appearance
- David Gerrold - M3 Green (uncredited)

Episode chronology
← Previous "The Eye of the Beholder"	Next → "The Pirates of Orion"

"The Jihad" is the sixteenth and final episode of the first season of the American animated science fiction television series Star Trek: The Animated Series. It first aired in the NBC Saturday morning lineup on January 12, 1974, and was written by Stephen Kandel who also wrote the earlier story "Mudd's Passion" and worked on the two Original Series "Mudd" episodes. (Note: This story was expanded into a novelette by science-fiction author Alan Dean Foster as part of the collection, Star Trek Log Five (1975). In this form, the story is named simply "Jihad", and M3 Green is phonetically rendered as "Em-Three-Green" while Laura became "Lara". (ISBN 0-345-33351-9).)

Set in the 23rd century, this series follows the further adventures of the crew of the Federation starship Enterprise. In this episode, Captain Kirk (voiced by William Shatner) and his first officer, Spock (voiced by Leonard Nimoy), become involved in a secret quest to retrieve a stolen artifact and prevent a warrior race from attacking the galaxy.

== Plot ==
On stardate 5683.1, the Federation starship Enterprise arrives at the Vedala asteroid, where Captain Kirk and First Officer Spock have been summoned to take part in the latest of several failed secret quests to learn about a stolen religious artifact, the "Soul of the Skorr", the theft of which could ignite a galactic holy war.

Joining Kirk and Spock is a team of specialists called in to help recover the item, which has been hidden on a very unstable and dangerous planet. The focal point of the mission as the primary stakeholder is "Tchar", the hereditary prince of the Skorr. The muscle of the team is provided by "Sord", a reptilian with great strength. An insectoid named "EM/3/GREEN" is a master lockpick. (Note: Although the exact species of "EM/3/GREEN" is never mentioned during the episode, the Starfleet Corps of Engineers novels gives the name of the species as the "Nasat" (one of the Nasat characters in the novels is named "P8 Blue").) The team is rounded out by the huntress "Lara", a humanoid who is an accomplished tracker with an impeccable sense of direction.

Kirk and Spock soon learn that one member of the party is a saboteur. It seems that Tchar has stolen the artifact himself in an effort to return his people to their warrior ways.

When the mission is completed, Tchar is held captive as insane, although with good prospects of rehabilitation. The Vedala states that they will eventually forget that these events ever happened. Kirk and Spock return to the Enterprise, where it seems that hardly any time at all has passed since their beam down to begin the mission.

== Production ==
Science fiction author David Gerrold, who wrote or co-wrote a number of live-action ("The Trouble with Tribbles") and animated ("More Tribbles, More Troubles", "Bem") Star Trek episodes, voices the character EM/3/GREEN for this episode. Actor James Doohan voices Sord and Tchar, in addition to his usual role as Chief Engineer Scott. Although given the standard screen credit in the main title, Nichelle Nichols (Lt. Uhura) is not part of this episode. Since she was dealing with pregnancy sickness, Majel Barrett was also absent, so Filmation mainstay Jane Webb stepped in to voice all the women characters.

== Reception ==
Mark A. Altman and Ed Gross said the episode "most probably resembles Saturday morning fare — though with Trek's traditionally heady bent." They allowed that some of the banter between Kirk and the huntress Laura, who flirts with the captain in a Brooklyn accent, is amusing, and that the null gravity combat is clever. They concluded "The Jihad" to be a successful break from typical Trek episode.
