= Orion (Star Trek) =

Fictional alien race

- Susan Oliver as Vina transformed into an Orion slave girl, in a scene used in both the Star Trek episodes "The Cage" and "The Menagerie".
- First appearance: "The Cage" (Star Trek: The Original Series)
- Last appearance: Star Trek: Lower Decks
- Created by: Gene Roddenberry
- Portrayed by: Various actors

The Orions are a fictional extraterrestrial humanoid species in the American science fiction franchise Star Trek, making their first appearance in the initial pilot for Star Trek: The Original Series, "The Cage". Susan Oliver portrayed the first Orion seen on screen, when her human character Vina was transformed into one, although it was Majel Barrett who underwent the original makeup test. The footage was subsequently used in the two-part episode "The Menagerie". Yvonne Craig, who was considered for the role of Vina, later played an Orion in "Whom Gods Destroy".

Male Orions made their first appearance in the Star Trek: The Animated Series episode "The Pirates of Orion" but did not appear in live action until the Star Trek: Enterprise episode "Borderland", which also featured female Orions. Orion women have also been seen in the films Star Trek and Star Trek Into Darkness, The animated series Star Trek: Lower Decks depicted Orions' as a matriarchal society, and features D'Vana Tendi, an Orion as a main character. Females of the species have become known as Orion slave girls, who have become popular among fans as cosplay.

The Orions' homeworld, Orion, is located in the Orionis system, in the Orion sector of the Alpha Quadrant. It is an M class world of hills, grassland and rocky coastlines. Orion society is a carefully balanced contradiction. While the nobility and ruling elements are entrenched in criminal activity, the planet itself seems mostly free of rampant crime thanks to the strict laws preventing inter-house conflict. There is a degree of respect and maintained civility on the planet that encourages outsiders to visit and trade in safety despite it being the seat of an interstellar criminal organization.

== Development ==
The first mention of the Orion was in Gene Roddenberry's first draft script for the initial pilot for Star Trek: The Original Series, "The Cage". At that stage, there was no further description given, except that they were to be alien in appearance. By the time that casting had been sought, it had been decided that the Orion character should be painted green, with the script stating that the character should be "Wild! Green skin, glistening as if oiled". Roddenberry had convinced the NBC executives to shoot in color to reduce scenery costs and so that the green skin of the character could be seen on screen. The costume for Vina was designed by William Ware Theiss, with Roddenberry pushing for it to be skimpier. Fred Phillips conducted makeup tests before the shooting began on the episode. As an actress had not yet been cast in the role of Vina, Majel Barrett instead stepped in. Several different shades of green greasepaint were applied to her, with different camera exposures and lighting settings tested. Those test shots were sent to be developed, and received back the following day.

To the surprise of the production team, Barrett appeared normal flesh colored in all footage. They tried again, applying a much darker shade of green. Once again, when the results were received, she didn't appear green at all. They tried a third time and the same result was received. Roddenberry phoned the development lab out of frustration, only to hear their surprise that the character was supposed to be green. They had presumed that the cinematographer had set up the camera incorrectly and had spent a great deal of time correcting Barrett back to a normal color.

A number of actresses were considered for the part, including Yvette Mimieux, Yvonne Craig, Barbara Eden and Anne Francis. Roddenberry's first choice was Susan Oliver, whose talent agency said she was an excellent dancer. She was convinced to take the role by Oscar Katz, an executive at Desilu Productions. He didn't attend the set in an effort to avoid Oliver, since he had undersold the difficulty of the makeup in the role.

To prepare for the Orion scenes, Oliver took a week's worth of choreography instruction, later stating in an interview with Starlog magazine that she was not a skilled dancer. The shoot with Oliver in green paint took place on December 4, 1965, with the actress stating in a later interview that "Even before the dance began and I was standing demurely to the side, this feeling was in the air. Gene had touched on something dark in man's unconscious; one could imagine doing something with a green mate that he would never dare someone of his own color." Phillips required an assistant to keep reapplying the green Max Factor greasepaint between shots, as due to Oliver's perspiration due to the heat from the studio lights and the dancing, it would become blotchy in patches and dry out in others. Portions of Oliver's dancing was cut as it was deemed as too sexy, along with a scene where she is whipped. The episode was subsequently rejected by NBC as a pilot, but the footage was later used in the two-part episode "The Menagerie". Unlike the other actors from "The Cage", Oliver's contract did not contain a clause to cover re-use of the footage, and so was not paid any additional fees. The first appearance of a male Orion was shown in the Star Trek: The Animated Series episode "The Pirates of Orion". An organized crime ring known as the Orion Syndicate was mentioned in Star Trek: Deep Space Nine, but no actual Orions were seen, only members of other species.

=== Star Trek: Enterprise and reboot films ===
Writer Mike Sussman sought to introduce the Orions into Star Trek: Enterprise with the episode "Anomaly", but during rewrites this was changed into a new species called the Osaarians. During Manny Coto's tenure as show runner in the fourth season, the Orions were re-introduced on screen for the first time since The Original Series in the episode "Borderland" in 2004, which was the first time that an Orion male had appeared on-screen in live action. Bobbi Sue Luther was cast as the main Orion slave girl in the episode, and she researched the history of the race on the internet prior to her performance as she was not familiar with the series before. Four hours of make-up work was required for Luther to be ready, and she described the costume as slightly skimpier than she was used to as a lingerie and bikini model. Isopropyl alcohol was used to remove the majority of the green makeup, but Luther said that it took several days for the rest to come off. Professional wrestler Big Show was one of several actors portraying male Orions in "Borderland".

A further Orion-centric episode was shown later in the fourth season. Entitled "Bound", there were three Orion slave girls central to the plot played by Cyia Batten, Crystal Allen and Menina Fortunato. In this case, the makeup was applied via spraying, but still took around four hours for the actresses to be ready for filming. Following the end of Enterprise, a reboot saw the franchise return to the era of The Original Series with the 2009 Star Trek remake. Rachel Nichols was cast as an Orion named Gaila, who was involved in a relationship with James T. Kirk (Chris Pine). Her hair and makeup process took up to six hours each day, and found that it would stain Pine's face green after they filmed a scene in which they kiss. She was disappointed not to be returning to the role for the following film, Star Trek Into Darkness. Scenes were also shot for Star Trek featuring Diora Baird as a second Orion woman, but these were cut and later included as a deleted scene on the home media releases. Roberto Orci, one of the writers of the reboot films, suggested in an interview with UGO Networks that these Orion women had been released from slavery through the means of an underground railroad.

== Appearances ==
The official Star Trek website describes the Orion species as being organised into a "loose nation or empire", also described as the Orion Syndicate. They are known for their criminal activities, such as piracy, illegal mining and black market exploitation. The first appearance of them in the Star Trek chronology was in the Enterprise episode "Borderland", when the Enterprise (NX-01) under Captain Jonathan Archer (Scott Bakula) travelled to an area of space known as the borderland, located between Klingon and Orion space. There they are attacked by two Orion ships, and several crew members are abducted. They track them down to an Orion slave market with the assistance of Arik Soong (Brent Spiner), and rescue them. In "Bound", the crew are contacted by an Orion vessel captained by Harrad-Sar (William Lucking), who offers to open relations between the Orion Syndicate and Starfleet. To celebrate the new venture, Archer is presented with three Orion women Navaar (Cyia Batten), D'Nesh (Crystal Allen) and Maras (Menina Fortunato). The pheromones of the women begin to affect the crew with the exception of Subcommander T'Pol (Jolene Blalock) and Commander Charles "Trip" Tucker III (Connor Trinneer), who successfully work together to prevent the Orions from stealing the ship. During a conversation between Archer and Harrad-Sar, the Orion admits that it is the three women who are in charge, and he is their slave.

The Talosians seek to stimulate an attraction between Captain Christopher Pike (Jeffrey Hunter) and Vina (Susan Oliver) in "The Cage". She was a woman who survived the crash of a spacecraft on Talos IV, and the Talosians had been projecting a series of illusions first to present her as a healthy human, but in order to begin an attraction, first as a princess from the Middle Ages, then as an Orion slave girl, and finally as a personification of Pike's wife. These events are reviewed during a court martial against Spock (Leonard Nimoy) by Captain James T. Kirk (William Shatner) in "The Menagerie". In "Journey to Babel", when the Enterprise is conveying many Delegates from the Federation's member planets to an important conference the Orions attempt to disrupt this Federation conference by inserting on board the Enterprise an agent who masquerades as the assistant/secretary to the delegate of the Andorian delegation, Shras. The agent, named Thelev (William O'Connell) kills the leader of the Tellarite delegation, Gav (John Wheeler), implicating Ambassador Sarek (Mark Lenard). After the Orion injures Captain Kirk, his ruse is discovered and a pursuing Orion vessel is destroyed. In "Whom Gods Destroy", when the USS Enterprise arrives at Elba II, a planet containing an underground mental asylum, they find Garth of Izar (Steve Ihnat) impersonating the Governor of the institution. He attempts to use an Orion woman, Marta (Yvonne Craig), to influence the Enterprise crew. When this fails, he exiles her to the planet's inhospitable surface, killing her. This episode was the first occasion in the franchise that the appearance of a true Orion was shown.

The Orion Syndicate is mentioned in Deep Space Nine as a criminal organisation, such as in "Honor Among Thieves" in which Chief Miles O'Brien (Colm Meaney) is placed undercover within the Syndicate by Starfleet Intelligence. In the 2009 Star Trek remake, an alternative universe is created after the Romulan Nero (Eric Bana) and his ship the Narada travel back in time seeking revenge after the destruction of their homeworld. While James T. Kirk (Chris Pine) is attending Starfleet Academy, he is romantically involved with an Orion woman named Gaila (Rachel Nichols) who is the roommate of Nyota Uhura (Zoe Saldaña). In the sequel, Star Trek Into Darkness, an Orion is seen in a crowd shot of San Francisco.

Star Trek: Lower Decks, an animated series first aired in 2020, features an Orion main character for the first time, D'Vana Tendi, a science officer voiced by Noël Wells.

Star Trek: Discovery includes Orions in seasons 3 and 4, which are set in the 32nd century.

Season 3 of Star Trek: Picard shows Orions on the planet of M'talas Prime as well as Orion Starfleet officers on the crew of the Titan-A. The sciences officer and operations officer on the Titan-A are the first live-action Orion Starfleet officers depicted in the Prime Universe.

== Reception ==
=== Fandom ===
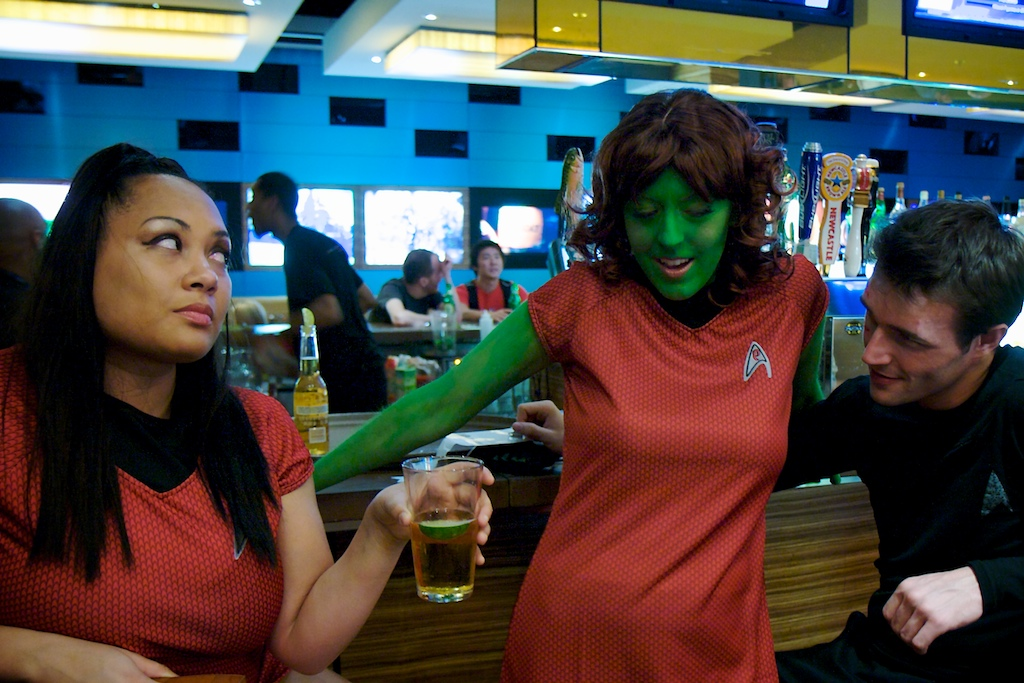
A Star Trek fan in an Orion costume

Fans of Star Trek embraced the Orions, specifically the image of the Orion slave girl, making it a popular choice for cosplay at science fiction conventions. This includes an Orion themed dance troupe called "Orion's Envy". Several fan-based Star Trek web series have been created since the end of Enterprise, including Star Trek Continues which follows on from the events of The Original Series. The second episode, "Lolani", focused on the events following the murder of three Tellarite crewmembers of a cargo vessel and the discovery that an Orion slave girl survived the incident. Lou Ferrigno, famous for his role as the Hulk in the 1978 The Incredible Hulk television series, appeared as a similarly green male Orion.

=== Critical reception ===
Justin Everett, in his essay "Fan Culture and the Recentering of Star Trek", described the appearance of the Orions in the fourth season of Enterprise as an attempt by Coto to bring viewers back to the series. However, he described the Orion women themselves as providing "softcore porn" to the viewer. Regarding those same appearances, David Greven wrote in his book Gender and Sexuality in Star Trek, that the attraction of the men on the Enterprise demonstrated the "extraordinary heterosexuality of all the Trek series" as none of them can resist them, nor do any of the women feel a similar attraction. Regarding their dancing, he found that it was "similar to the jerky movement of birds", referencing that the sirens of Greek mythology shared some features with humans and others with birds.

== In other media ==
- The Green Girl is a 2014 biographical documentary film of Susan Oliver, so named for her role in "The Cage".
- The 2015 parodic Henry Danger episode "Dream Busters" (the title itself a reference to Ghostbusters) is almost completely set in a world made of hallucinations, one of which is an almost mute character which another hallucination names "the Green Dancing Girl", clearly a reference to Star Trek's Orions.
- In The Big Bang Theory, season 11 episode 4, Leonard complains that the dry cleaner did not get the stain out of his Starfleet uniform. Penny remarks that he would not have to dry clean it so much if he did not make her wear the green body paint in bed, but Leonard decides that it was worth it.
