= Sergeant Swell of the Mounties =

- Directed by: Len Janson; Chuck Menville
- Written by: Len Janson; Chuck Menville
- Produced by: Len Janson; Chuck Menville
- Starring: Chuck Menville; Kathy Puerta; Len Janson; Tony Krizan; Dave Brain; Ron Quigley; John Tucker
- Cinematography: Ron Foreman
- Distributed by: Pyramid Films
- Release date: 1972
- Running time: 16 minutes
- Country: United States
- Language: English

Sergeant Swell of the Mounties is a 1972 short film written and directed by Len Janson and Chuck Menville, and starring Menville in the title role. Sergeant Swell short films were featured on the Glen Campbell Goodtime Hour during the 1971 season, which began on September 14, 1971.

The film is a pixilation spoof of Sergeant Preston of the Yukon.
