= Web Woman =

Television series

Web Woman is a television series that originally aired as part of Tarzan and the Super 7 by Filmation. Web Woman is the alias of Kelly Webster. Web Woman's voice was provided by actress Linda Gary.

== Series format ==
Kelly is a NASA scientist turned farmer who saves the life of a tall, thin insectoid alien when he is swept into a raging river during a thunderstorm. In gratitude, the alien presents her with a special ring with a black widow "hourglass" design which grants her the powers of the entire insect kingdom. The alien proves to be an agent of the mysterious entity named Scarab, the guardian of the space station Citadel 7, who communicates with her via a huge crystal orb in the secret lair hidden in a cavern beneath her barn. Exactly how she came into contact with Scarab after receiving the ring was not specified in any of the cartoons, but she becomes Web Woman soon afterward. In the episode "The Lady in The Lamp", Scarab is implied to be immortal, or at least extremely long-lived as he had mentioned imprisoning the evil entity Ashta 10,000 years prior to meeting Kelly. Her transformation from Kelly Webster into Web Woman is brought on by a vocal command, combined with the power of the ring, that is spoken like this:

"Insects of the world...small creatures of the cosmos...lend me your powers--NOW!"

Although the full range of her powers are never displayed completely, Web Woman's most common ability is the power to communicate mentally with insects.

=== Clothing, allies, and equipment ===
Ordinarily she is seen with a white shirt and tan slacks. When Kelly turns into Web Woman, her outfit changes into a purple leotard with a W-shaped collar, a matching belt, matching boots, and a matching skullcap with an attached antennae-like W-shaped black mask. She has a variety of weapons, such as a rope-like "web-line" that unspools from her utility belt and obeys her commands, and the ring can produce sleeping gas, an energy beam that solidifies into a spider web for ensnaring enemies, and a force field of energized webbing.

Web Woman is aided in her missions for Scarab by a cute plump and furry green alien with bat-like ears, big buck teeth and large black eyes who responds to the name of Spinner. While the shrilly-gibbering little space creature is often used for comic relief, he is also an expert mechanic and has the ability to curl up into a ball and roll at high speed so that he can bowl over the enemies Web Woman fights. Together they travel in a spider-shaped, eight-legged flying saucer she calls the Web-Trac. The Web-Trac can burrow through the ground as easily as it flies through space.

=== Enemies ===
Web Woman heeds the Web Call from Scarab to fight such enemies as Dr. Abyss, Madame Macabre, Dr. Jack Frankenstein, Rax, Dr. Despair, Mr. Perfect, and Tsetse.

== Episodes ==
1. "The Rainmaker" (written by Don Heckman)
2. "The Eye of the Fly" (written by Gerry Boudreau, Len Janson, Don Heckman, Buzz Dixon, and Chuck Menville)
3. "The World Within" (written by J. Michael Reaves)
4. "Madame Macabre's Calamity Circus" (written by Patrick Harmon)
5. "Red Snails at Sunset" (written by Kathleen Barnes and David Wise)
6. "Send in the Clones" (written by Gerry Boudreau)
7. "The Sun Thief" (written by William S. Lipsher)
8. "Dr. Despair and the Mood Machine" (written by Buzz Dixon)
9. "The Perfect Crime" (written by Gerry Boudreau)
10. "The Lady in the Lamp" (written by Buzz Dixon)

== Parallels to other comics characters ==
=== DC Comics ===
Web Woman's origin, that of a Terrestrial human saving the life of an alien whose reward to the human is a grant of super-human powers, usually through an alien artifact of some sort, is a parallel of that of the DC Comics character Lana Lang, during the Silver Age of Comics, becoming a crusader who used the primary alias of The Insect Queen and was featured in the pages of Superboy, a comic-book series that dealt with the adventures of Superman when he was a boy. It is also similar, though not identical, to that of Hal Jordan becoming the Green Lantern in the Silver Age Of Comics. (It is not identical because Jordan's benefactor, Abin Sur, died just after he had benefitted Jordan.)

=== Marvel ===
Web Woman's primary alias, real name, origin story, and list of abilities and equipment all had to be revised after Marvel Comics learned of Filmation Associates's plans. Marvel rather hastily created Spider-Woman, real name Jessica Drew, in the pages of Marvel Spotlight to seize ownership of the copyright.
