= Chuck Menville =

American screenwriter (1940–1992)

- Born: Charles David Menville; April 17, 1940; Baton Rouge, Louisiana, U.S.
- Died: June 15, 1992 (aged 52); Malibu, California, U.S.
- Resting place: Forest Lawn Memorial Park, Hollywood Hills
- Occupations: Television animator, writer
- Children: 2, including Scott
- Writing career
- Period: 1967–1992

Charles David Menville (April 17, 1940 – June 15, 1992) was an American animator and writer for television. His credits included Batman: The Animated Series, Land of the Lost, The Real Ghostbusters, The Smurfs, Star Trek: The Animated Series, and Tiny Toon Adventures.

== Pixilation: career in 1960s and 1970s ==
Menville was born in Baton Rouge, Louisiana, but moved to Los Angeles at the age of 19 with aspirations of becoming an animator. There, he got a job with Walt Disney Productions and served as an assistant on the 1967 film The Jungle Book. Unhappy with the climate at Disney, Menville soon branched out into writing, and began a long working partnership with his friend Len Janson.

During the mid-1960s, Menville and Janson co-produced a series of short live-action films, among them the Academy Award-nominated Stop Look and Listen, an innovative stop-motion pixilation experiment in which the main characters "drive" down city streets in invisible cars.

Disney and other Hollywood studios saw little use for pixilation, which became largely forgotten after McLaren moved on to using other animation techniques for later films. Menville and Janson revived the technique, introducing it to a new generation.

Menville and Janson followed Stop Look and Listen with their 1967 short film Vicious Cycles, a comedy shot in 16 mm, featuring a gang of hard-core bikers intimidating a motor scooter club. Menville played the head of the scooter club. Clips from the film were featured in a 1970 summer television series on the ABC network called The New Communicators and made Menville's pixilation technique famous in the USA.

Gulf Oil soon hired them to do a series of pixilation commercials for its "no-nox" gasoline, which allowed them to increase the production value of their films.

They graduated to 35 mm with their next short film, 1970's Blaze Glory, a spoof of cliche western movies in which heroes and villains rode around the Old West, without horses. Menville played the title character. It was an ambitious and elaborate short film, in which a full-scale stagecoach, with no wheels, was physically animated, along with an animated moving camera, frame-by-frame for a complex robbery scene. The film, with its other elaborate animated sight gags, was a hit short film at midnight movies in the early 1970s.

They followed this with two more 35 mm short films, Sergeant Swell (1972), and Captain Mom (also 1972), the first a spoof of "Northwestern" stories and the other a spoof of superheroes. The later film was mostly live action with a minimum of their now-trademark pixilation animation technique, and failed to garner a large audience, but by then Menville and Janson had established themselves as a creative force within Hollywood animation production circles.

In the mid-1970s, the team began a stint at Filmation, during which they brought their irreverent style to Star Trek: The Animated Series, writing two episodes: "Once Upon a Planet" and "The Practical Joker". The "rec room" in the latter episode is seen by many within Star Trek fandom as the genesis of the holodeck.

== Later career ==
In the 1980s, Menville contributed to a number of Saturday morning series, including The Smurfs, The Real Ghostbusters, and Kissyfur. Among his last projects before his death in 1992 was the episode "Opah" of the live-action Land of the Lost, for which he was nominated for the Humanitas Prize in Live-action Children's programming. Menville's final project was writing the Batman: The Animated Series episode "Birds of a Feather". However, he died before the episode was finished. Brynne Stephens wrote the teleplay for the episode based on Menville's story, for which he received a story credit in the completed episode.

Menville was the author of The Harlem Globetrotters: Fifty Years of Fun and Games, a history of the famed basketball team. It was published by the D. McKay Company in 1978.

=== Death ===
Menville died in Malibu, California in 1992 of non-Hodgkin lymphoma. The episode "Thingamajigger" of The Little Mermaid was dedicated to his memory.

== Family ==
He was the father of Scott Menville, an American musician and voice artist, and Chad Menville, an American writer.

== Screenwriting ==
- series head writer denoted in bold

=== Television ===
- Dr. Kildare (1964)
- Cattanooga Cats (1969)
- Sabrina the Teenage Witch (1969–1972)
- Will the Real Jerry Lewis Please Sit Down (1970)
- Groovie Goolies (1970)
- The Flintstones Comedy Hour (1972)
- Fat Albert and the Cosby Kids (1972)
- Lassie's Rescue Rangers (1972–1973)
- Speed Buggy (1973)
- Star Trek: The Animated Series (1973–1974)
- Wheelie and the Chopper Bunch (1974)
- Hong Kong Phooey (1974)
- Korg: 70,000 B.C. (1974)
- Shazam! (1974)
- Wacky and Packy (1975)
- The New Adventures of Gilligan (1975)
- The Secrets of Isis (1976)
- Ark II (1976)
- Tarzan, Lord of the Jungle (1976–1978)
- The New Adventures of Batman (1977)
- Space Sentinels (1977)
- Tarzan and the Super 7 (1978)
  - **The Freedom Force**
  - Jason of Star Command
  - **Manta and Moray**
  - **Superstretch and Microwoman**
  - **Web Woman**
- The New Fred and Barney Show (1979)
- The New Shmoo (1979)
- The Flintstone Comedy Show (1980)
- The Love Boat (1981)
- Space Stars (1981)
- The Smurfs (1981)
  - The Smurfs Springtime Special (1982)
  - The Smurfs Christmas Special (1982)
  - My Smurfy Valentine (1983)
- Mork & Mindy/Laverne & Shirley/Fonz Hour (1982)
- Dirkham Detective Agency (1983)
- The Biskitts (1983)
- **Benji, Zax & the Alien Prince** (1983)
- Going Bananas (1984)
- Kissyfur (1985–1986)
- Adderly (1986)
- **The Real Ghostbusters** (1986–1991): head writer (seasons 3–7)
- Little Wizards (1987–1988)
- Slimer! and the Real Ghostbusters (1988–1989)
- P. J. Funnybunny (1989)
- Tiny Toon Adventures (1990)
- Land of the Lost (1991–1992)
- Summer Stories: The Mall - Part 2 (1992)
- The Little Mermaid (1992)
- Solarman (1992)
- Batman: The Animated Series (1993)

=== Films ===
- Stop Look and Listen (1967)
- Daffy Duck and Porky Pig Meet the Groovie Goolies (1972)
