= Speed Buggy =

American animated television series (1973)

- The series' title card
- Genre: Comedy; Mystery; Adventure
- Created by: William Hanna; Joseph Barbera
- Directed by: Charles A. Nichols
- Voices of: Mel Blanc; Michael Bell; Arlene Golonka; Phil Luther Jr.
- Theme music composer: Hoyt Curtin
- Composer: Hoyt Curtin
- Country of origin: United States
- Original language: English
- No. of seasons: 1
- No. of episodes: 16

Production
- Executive producers: William Hanna; Joseph Barbera
- Producer: Iwao Takamoto
- Running time: 30 minutes
- Production company: Hanna-Barbera Productions

Original release
- Network: CBS
- Release: September 8 – December 22, 1973

Speed Buggy is an American animated television series, produced by Hanna-Barbera, which originally aired for one season on CBS from September 8, 1973, to December 22, 1973. With the voices of Mel Blanc, Michael Bell, Arlene Golonka, and Phil Luther Jr., the show follows an orange anthropomorphic dune buggy who alongside teenagers Debbie, Mark, and Tinker, solves mysteries while participating in racing competitions around the world. The series was produced by Iwao Takamoto, executive produced by William Hanna and Joseph Barbera, and directed by Charles A. Nichols.

The series was originally developed under the working titles Speed Bug and Speed Buggs before Speed Buggy was settled on. Takamoto was less involved with the series due to the trust he had in storyboard and animation artist Bob Singer. The concept for the show was inspired by the 1968 Walt Disney Pictures film The Love Bug and the Speed Racer anime franchise. Several of the storylines originated on another Hanna-Barbera series, Josie and the Pussycats.

Speed Buggy lasted for one season with a total of sixteen episodes. Despite its short run, it was broadcast on the Big Three television networks years after its original run as the channels had purchased syndication rights. It was speculated that the series acquired a fan base due to its frequent rotation on American television, often replacing quickly-cancelled new cartoons. Critical response to Speed Buggy was generally positive; some critics enjoyed its shared themes with Josie & the Pussycats and Scooby-Doo, Where Are You!, while others found it unmemorable and derivative. It has since been released on DVD as part of Warner Bros.' Archive Collection on a four disc set.

== Premise ==
Set in an assortment of locations around the world, the series follows three teenagers (Mark, Debbie, and Tinker) and a talking dune buggy as they partake in various adventures. Speed Buggy, the dune buggy, was designed by Tinker and participates in racing competitions in order to collect winner's trophies. During their travels, the crew often defeats villains and crooks in order to save the world, such as diamond thieves, car-obsessed doctors, and evil pirates. Known as the "Speed Buggs", the group of three teenagers is able to activate Speed Buggy through the use of a portable walkie-talkie. Several episodes in the series feature reworked versions of storylines from Hanna-Barbera's Josie and the Pussycats.

== Characters ==
The series features the following four main characters throughout its run:

- Speed Buggy (voiced by Mel Blanc) – An orange anthropomorphic dune buggy nicknamed "Speedy" who has the ability to talk and solve mysteries. His headlights and front grille serve as his eyes and mouth, respectively. He served as the "wacky hero" of the series with St. Bernard-like qualities. Blanc's frequent work as a voice actor with Hanna-Barbera landed him the position. His voice was similar to the Maxwell automobile he portrayed on the radio series The Jack Benny Program.
- Mark (voiced by Michael Bell) – A teenager and the designated "brain" of the group. Mark was one of Bell's first voice roles, with his only other credits at the time being for The Houndcats and The New Scooby-Doo Movies, as well as the Artful Dodger in Oliver and the Artful Dodger, the only two-part episode of The ABC Saturday Superstar Movie.
- Debbie (voiced by Arlene Golonka) – The beautiful teenage girl and leader of the group. Marking Golonka's first role as a voice actress, she had only previously acted on various series such as The Andy Griffith Show and Mayberry R.F.D..
- Tinker (voiced by Phil Luther Jr.) – A Southern-drawling teenage mechanic who is Speed Buggy's designated driver and best friend.

== Production and creation ==
Speed Buggy was developed with the working titles Speed Bug and Speed Buggs. The show's concept was partly inspired by the 1968 Walt Disney Pictures film The Love Bug and the Japanese Speed Racer franchise. It was hinted by author David Hofstede that the "Chugga-Boom" vehicle in Hanna-Barbera's The Perils of Penelope Pitstop served as a prototype for the vehicle in Speed Buggy. Executive produced by William Hanna and Joseph Barbera's Hanna-Barbera Productions, Charles A. Nichols served as the director and Art Scott was the associate producer. Iwao Takamoto, the main producer, expressed in his posthumous 2009 autobiography that the creation of Speed Buggy occurred due to the success of his other productions Josie & the Pussycats and Scooby-Doo, Where Are You!. He wrote that his participation in the series was partly because he enjoyed getting "[his] hands on a show whenever [he] felt it was necessary"; however, he was ultimately less involved with the show due to his trust with Bob Singer, an animation artist for Hanna-Barbera productions at the time.

Jack Mendelshon and Chuck Menville were the two head writers for the episodes. Several other writers contributed to the series, including Lars Bourne, Len Janson, Joel Kane, Jack Kaplan, Woody Kling, Norman Maurer, and Larry Rhine. The main title theme for Speed Buggy was copyrighted in November 1975; it was composed by Hoyt Curtin under the supervision of Paul DeKorte. Besides the leading roles, other voice actors involved with the series include Mike Road, Hal Smith, John Stephenson, and Janet Waldo.

== Episodes ==
No.	Title	Original release date	Prod. code
1	"Speed Buggy Went That-a-Way"	September 8, 1973	65-1
While visiting Debbie's aunt Belle, the crew witnesses the theft of her cattle on her ranch. Speed Buggy, Debbie, Tinker, and Mark set out to stop the evil Beefinger, the mastermind behind the robbery.
2	"Speed Buggy's Daring Escapade"	September 15, 1973	65-2
After learning about Speed Buggy's capabilities, Dr. Kluge plots to steal the automobile in order to create his own powerful version. Through various bribes and kidnapping attempts, Kluge is desperate to steal Speed Buggy.
3	"Taggert's Trophy"	September 22, 1973	65-3
During a racing event, a man known as "The Chief" hijacks all of the cars with a motion-control device. The crew tries to put an end to the menace's unacceptable behavior.
4	"Speed Buggy Falls in Love"	September 29, 1973	65-4
While participating in a race, Speed Buggy takes a liking to Mata Cari, an automobile designed by the evil Baron Vulch. Meanwhile, Vulch's assistant Pygmo lures Speed Buggy to a castle to retrieve a device that Vulch planted inside of his trunk.
5	"Kingzilla"	October 6, 1973	65-5
In the Andes, the crew vacates a plane facing difficulty while flying, deserting them in region solely inhabited by gorillas. Two men, Professor Grovac and Karl, pressure Speed Buggy into kidnapping the king gorilla in order to have their own army.
6	"Professor Snow and Madame Ice"	October 13, 1973	65-6
The villainous Professor Snow and Madame Ice create automobiles for ice in order to travel. After learning about Speed Buggy, they attempt to control Tinker in order to take over the world.
7	"Out of Sight"	October 20, 1973	65-7
Speed Buggy and crew help Professor Rigby, who is being attacked by his former colleague Professor Rishna after discovering an invisibility solution. Rishna uses it to kidnap Debbie and Mark while Tinker and Speed Buggy come to their rescue.
8	"Gold Fever"	October 27, 1973	65-8
The menacing Gold Fever manages to steal gold from around the world, even Speed Buggy's prized racing trophy. In order to stop his continued thefts and rescue Debbie after being kidnapped, Mark and Tinker travel to Hawaii to end his plans.
9	"Island of the Giant Plants"	November 3, 1973	65-9
Traveling aboard a cruise ship, the crew falls overboard and ends up on an island infested by large plants that were modified by Dr. Meangreen. In order to control the universe, Dr. Meangreen attempts to steal Speed Buggy's remote control device.
10	"Soundmaster"	November 10, 1973	65-11
An evil replica of Speed Buggy designed by Dr. Ohm steals a powerful battery capable of ruining objects through the use of sound waves. The crew breaks into Dr. Ohm's secret headquarters in order to retrieve the stolen device and return to normalcy.
11	"The Ringmaster"	November 17, 1973	65-10
The crew visits Pleasure Island to enter the Bayou 500 racing competition. During the race, they find a ringmaster who plans to control all of the nearby animals in order to rule the world.
12	"The Incredible Changing Man"	November 24, 1973	65-12
At a race in the United States and Mexico, the crew encounters Jerick who is able to grow and multiply due to a powerful potion that Jerick's former friend created. However, the former friend places the potion's recipe on a tape that Jerick steals, so he asks Speed Buggy to retrieve the tape and save the day.
13	"Secret Safari"	December 1, 1973	65-13
Crazy scientists Varzak and Emil create a laser device that has the ability to take over the universe. In order to safely hide the device from the authorities, they plan to steal Speed Buggy and escape through a jungle.
14	"Oil's Well That Ends Well"	December 8, 1973	65-14
In an oil reserve in Oklahoma, the crew encounters Dr. Vesuvio who is collecting large quantities of oil in order to rule the world. However, they discover that Vesuvio has been illegally hoarding the oil in order to accomplish the feat.
15	"The Hidden Valley of Amazonia"	December 15, 1973	65-15
While in the Himalayas, Speed Buggy visits the Hidden Valley of Amazonia where the women use the men for slaves. Queen Sheba pressures Debbie into turning Mark and Tinker into slaves. In order to stop her plans, Speed Buggy and Debbie attempt to overthrow Queen Sheba.
16	"Captain Schemo and the Underwater City"	December 22, 1973	65-16
Captain Schemo plans to use his private collection of submarines in order to take over the oceans and the world. The crew stumbles upon Captain Scheemo's underwater stash and attempts to stop him before he controls the entire universe.

== Reception ==
=== Broadcast history ===
Speed Buggy was broadcast on CBS as part of their Saturday morning children's lineup between September 8 and December 22, 1973. Before being cancelled, it continued to air regularly until August 31, 1974. After its original run, CBS included reruns of Speed Buggy in their children-oriented television blocks; it was broadcast from February 4, 1978, to September 2, 1978, and September 18, 1982, to January 29, 1983. It also played on both ABC and NBC, when they acquired syndication rights for the series. ABC aired it at noon (EST) from September 6, 1975, to September 4, 1976. When NBC abruptly canceled McDuff, the Talking Dog on November 20, 1976, Speed Buggy aired in reruns from November 27, 1976, to September 1977. According to The A.V. Club's Will Harris, the series was successful and had a large fan base because it aired on all three major television networks in the 1970s.

During the 1980s, the series was rerun as part of the USA Network's USA Cartoon Express block, and Cartoon Network has broadcast Speed Buggy on several occasions since its initial launch in 1992. As part of a Valentine's Day event in February 2007, sister channel Boomerang aired the program alongside other cartoons such as Tom and Jerry, The Jetsons, and Dexter's Laboratory. The episode "Speed Buggy Went That-a-Way" was featured on the Warner Bros. Presents DVD compilation Saturday Morning Cartoons – 1970's Volume 1 and released on May 26, 2009. As part of the Warner Bros. Home Entertainment's Archive Collection, the complete Speed Buggy series was made available on DVD as a four-disc set.

=== Critical response ===
In retrospective reviews, critics saw the series as similar to the Scooby-Doo franchise. Aubrey Sitterson of Geek.com included Speed Buggy on their unranked list of "favorite Scooby-Doo knockoffs". He noted similarities between Speedy and Scooby-Doo's "Mystery Machine", and joked that Tinker is "basically just Shaggy in a jumpsuit". However, he hinted that Speed Buggy's success could have been derived from its shared storylines as seen on Josie & the Pussycats. Similarly, Harris from The A.V. Club agreed and wrote that the main difference between the two shows was that Speed Buggy "substitut[ed] racing for rock 'n' roll". He also claimed that the main character "confirm[ed] that sidekicks don't always have to be animals". Speed Buggy and the Scooby-Doo gang would be featured in a crossover episode ("The Weird Winds of Winona") in the second installment of the Scooby-Doo franchise, The New Scooby-Doo Movies (1972-1973).

Several comparisons were made between the show and other works created by Hanna-Barbera. David Mansour, author of From Abba to Zoom: A Pop Culture Encyclopedia of the Late 20th Century, wrote in his book that Speed Buggy shared several characteristics with Hanna-Barbera's Scooby-Doo, Where Are You!. He speculated that Mark was the "Freddy-esque handsome brain", Debbie was the "Daphne-esque pretty girlfriend", and Tinker was the "Shaggy-esque mechanic and driver". Furthermore, he considered Speed Buggy to be one of the most "famous dune buggies of pop culture" alongside the buggies in The Funky Phantom, The Banana Splits, and the Big Jim toy line. In a retrospective view of older cartoons, the staff at MeTV included the show on their list of "15 Forgotten Cartoons from the Early 1970s You Used to Love". On a more negative note, author David Perlmutter found Hanna-Barbera's use of "humanized automobiles" to be too predictable and repetitive.

=== Legacy ===
Speed Buggy would not be the last time Hanna-Barbera incorporated automobiles into animation. Both Wheelie and the Chopper Bunch and Wonder Wheels also featured cars that were able to talk and act like humans. Perlmutter grouped the three shows together, calling them a "trilogy". Wonderbug, an occasional live-action segment on ABC's The Krofft Supershow (1976-1978), featured three teenagers and a talking dune buggy and often drew comparisons to Speed Buggy and The Love Bug. Also compared to the show was Adult Swim's Mike Tyson Mysteries, with Rolling Stone's James Montgomery calling it an ode to classic cartoons like Speed Buggy, Scooby-Doo, and Captain Caveman and the Teen Angels.

The characters in Speed Buggy would also be featured in a 1973 Milton Bradley board game, where players would race Speed Buggy and other buggies in a fictionalized version of Baja California. Speed Buggy would also make cameo appearances in later cartoons, including Johnny Bravo, My Life as a Teenage Robot, Invader Zim, the 2020 Animaniacs series, South Park, Harvey Birdman, Attorney at Law, and Futurama.

In 2005 (original airing December 25, 2005), an episode of the Adult Swim animated series Stroker & Hoop titled "Putting the 'Ass' in Assassin (a.k.a. "Three Cheats in The Wind")", Hoop has a "flashback" where its from an episode of Speed Buggy as Stroker becomes Mark, Hoop becomes Tinker, C.A.R.R. becomes Speed Buggy while Double Wide becomes Debbie.

In 2018, an updated version of Speed Buggy appeared in the DC comic book The Flash/Speed Buggy Special.

The characters make a brief cameo at the end of the second episode of Scooby-Doo and Guess Who?, which also is a crossover with The Funky Phantom.

Speed Buggy and Tinker both appear in the HBO Max original series Jellystone! with Tinker voiced by Dana Snyder.

The characters appeared in the 2021 CW special Scooby-Doo, Where Are You Now!
