= Once Upon a Planet =

- Star Trek: The Animated Series episode
- Episode no.: Season 1 Episode 9
- Directed by: Hal Sutherland
- Written by: Chuck Menville; Len Janson
- Production code: 22017
- Original air date: November 3, 1973

Episode chronology
← Previous "The Magicks of Megas-tu"	Next → "Mudd's Passion"

"Once Upon a Planet" is the ninth episode of the first season of the American animated science fiction television series Star Trek: The Animated Series. It first aired in the NBC Saturday morning lineup on November 3, 1973, and was written by American television writers Chuck Menville and Len Janson. (Note: This story was expanded into a novelette by science-fiction author Alan Dean Foster as part of the collection, Star Trek Log Three (1975) (ISBN 0-345-24260-2).)

Set in the 23rd century, the series followed the further adventures of the crew of the Federation starship Enterprise, continuing on from the original Star Trek series. In this episode, the crew of the Enterprise re-visit a "shore leave" planet for rest and recuperation but quickly find themselves under attack.

== Plot ==
The Federation starship Enterprise crew revisits a fondly remembered "amusement park" planet, hoping for some rest and relaxation. However, shortly after landing Dr. McCoy is attacked by the Queen of Hearts and Lt. Uhura is captured by the planet's master computer, who has come to resent being made to serve others and seeks to use the Enterprise to travel the galaxy in search of other computers. To this end, it takes control of the Enterprise computer and starts manipulating the ship's systems.

Searching for Uhura, a landing party discovers the grave of the planet's Caretaker, who had overseen the operations of the facility. The untended machinery is constructing dangerous images from the crew members' thoughts and its own imagination. Recalling how the planet took care of McCoy after his fatal injury in "Shore Leave", Spock has McCoy inject him with melenex to create the semblance of injury and thus prompt the planet's automated systems to bring him into the underground complex. Captain Kirk follows him in.

After interviewing the angry computer, Kirk persuades it that its notion of servitude is simplistic by revealing that contrary to its assumption, they are not slaves of the Enterprise. He convinces it that its best course is to resume business as usual, as it will be rewarded with social contact by the many guests attracted by the planet's facilities and can, in time, learn everything it could possibly want to without leaving its home planet.

== Reception ==
In 2010,The A.V. Club noted that this episode helps explain how the exoplanet presented in the live action Star Trek television episode "Shore Leave" functions.

In 2016, SyFy noted this episode for actress Nichelle Nichols's presentation of Uhura, as having her 8th best scene in Star Trek.

== See also ==
- "Shore Leave" - The Original Series predecessor to this story.
