= Going Bananas (American TV series) =

- Genre: Comedy
- Created by: Len Janson; Chuck Menville
- Written by: William Cannon; Richard Dimitri; Marc Gass; Len Janson; Chuck Menville; Michael Reeves
- Directed by: Bob LaHendro
- Starring: James Avery; Marie Denn; Emily Moultrie; Bill Saluga; Tim Topper; Lynnanne Zager
- Music by: Haim Saban; Shuki Levy
- Opening theme: "Going Bananas", performed by Irene Cara
- Country of origin: United States
- No. of seasons: 1
- No. of episodes: 12

Production
- Executive producers: Len Janson; Chuck Menville; William Hanna; Joseph Barbera
- Producers: Christopher Brough; Gene Marcione
- Running time: 30 minutes
- Production companies: Janson-Menville Productions; Hanna-Barbera Productions

Original release
- Network: NBC
- Release: September 15 – December 1, 1984

Going Bananas is a live-action superhero/comedy television series aired from September 15 to December 1, 1984 on NBC. The series was produced by Hanna-Barbera Productions. The opening theme was produced by Giorgio Moroder and performed by Irene Cara.

== Plot ==
Roxana Banana is an orangutan that escaped from the zoo and was adopted by the Cole family. One night, a mysterious spaceship comes down from the sky and endows Roxana with super powers via a lightning bolt. Roxana is pursued by two crooks who want to use her superpowers for their own ill will, but Roxana's outdodging them by means of her powers, as well as the predicaments she creates for the Coles, provide much of the comedy for this series.

== Show add-ons ==
Also included was "Jungle Jukebox", a takeoff on the then-popular music videos using popular songs with animals in the visuals, and parodies of then-current TV shows and commercials using animals.

== Cast ==
- James Avery as Hank
- Marie Denn as Gran
- Emily Moultrie as Louise Cole
- Bill Saluga as Hubert
- Tim Topper as Jamie Cole
- Lynnanne Zager as Delivery Girl
