= Albatross (Star Trek: The Animated Series) =

- Star Trek: The Animated Series episode
- Episode no.: Season 2 Episode 4
- Directed by: Bill Reed
- Written by: Dario Finelli
- Production code: 22019
- Original air date: September 28, 1974

Guest appearance
- Lou Scheimer as Demos

Episode chronology
← Previous "The Practical Joker"	Next → "How Sharper Than a Serpent's Tooth"

"Albatross" is the fourth episode of the second season of the American animated science fiction television series Star Trek: The Animated Series, the 20th episode overall. It first aired in the NBC Saturday morning lineup on September 28, 1974, and was written by Dario Finelli. (Note: This story was expanded into a novelette by science-fiction author Alan Dean Foster as part of the collection, Star Trek Log Six (1976) (ISBN 0-345-24655-1).)

In this episode, Dr. McCoy is arrested and charged with mass murder committed 19 years earlier. This is the last appearance of Nurse Christine Chapel in the animated series. She did not return until Star Trek: The Motion Picture, released five years later.

== Plot ==
On stardate 5275.6, when the Federation starship Enterprise visits the planet Dramia to deliver medical supplies, the authorities immediately arrest Chief Medical Officer Dr. McCoy for mass murder. The Dramians allege that 19 years earlier Dr. McCoy had supervised an inoculation program on Dramia II, and that once he had left most of the inhabitants died from a plague. The Dramian government believes the plague must have been a result of McCoy's activities there.

Captain Kirk takes the Enterprise to Dramia II to investigate. There they find a survivor named Kol-Tai who was off-world at the time of the plague but remembers being healed by McCoy and is willing to testify that the doctor is not a mass murderer. En route back to Dramia their prime witness begins to develop symptoms of the plague, marked by a change in the coloring of skin pigmentation. In the process the crew is infected with the same plague, except for First Officer Spock who appears to be immune due to his Vulcan heritage.

With the entire ship's crew infected, Spock is forced to break McCoy out of jail on Dramia, first using the Vulcan nerve pinch to knock out a guard, so that they can beam back and work out a cure. Near death, Kirk realizes that the pigment color change was actually caused by a spatial aurora. McCoy is now able to develop a cure and the Dramians drop all charges against him.

== Casting ==
Filmation co-founder Lou Scheimer supplied the voice of Draman guard, while regular cast member James Doohan voiced the Draman Supreme Prefect as well as plague survivor Kol-Tai.

== Reception ==
In a 2017 review of this episode by Tor.com, they note that starship Enterprise must deliver medical supplies and gave it an overall rating of 5 out of 10.
