= How Sharper Than a Serpent's Tooth =

- Star Trek: The Animated Series episode
- Episode no.: Season 2 Episode 5
- Directed by: Bill Reed
- Written by: Russell Bates; David Wise
- Production code: 22022
- Original air date: October 5, 1974

Episode chronology
| ← Previous "Albatross" | Next → "The Counter-Clock Incident" |

"How Sharper Than a Serpent's Tooth" is the fifth and penultimate episode of the second season of the American animated science fiction television series Star Trek: The Animated Series, the 21st episode overall. It first aired in the NBC Saturday morning lineup on October 5, 1974, and was written by Russell Bates and David Wise. (Note: This story was expanded into a novelette by science-fiction author Alan Dean Foster as part of the collection, Star Trek Log Six (1976) (ISBN 0-345-24655-1).)

The title comes from Act 1, Scene 4 of William Shakespeare's King Lear: "How sharper than a serpent's tooth it is to have a thankless child!"

In this episode, the Enterprise must contend with alien entity that demands it be worshiped as a god.

The Animated Series won the Daytime Emmy Award for Outstanding Children's Series for this episode.

== Plot ==
On stardate 6063.4, following a signal from a mysterious probe, the Federation starship Enterprise is immobilized by an alien whose ship resembles a winged serpent. The alien claims to be Kukulkan, god of the ancient Maya and Aztec peoples of Earth. He says that he is actually a very long-lived, benevolent entity who wants the humans to worship him, as the Mayas and Aztecs did. Upon resistance by the crew, he proclaims them "thankless".

Kukulkan transports Captain Kirk, Chief Medical Officer Dr. McCoy, Chief Engineer Scott and Ensign Walking Bear to his ship. By using technology similar to a holodeck, Kukulkan makes them believe they are standing in the middle of an ancient city. Kukulkan warns them that he will only appear before them once they've solved the riddle of the city.

The city combines the architectures of many ancient Earth cultures: Egyptian, Aztec, Chinese, etc. Kirk concludes that Kukulkan had visited many of the peoples on Earth, but each only took a portion of what he taught them. So none of them ever fulfilled the complete instructions to signal his return.

By chance, Kirk scales a huge pyramid in the center of the city. There, he concludes that the sun will activate Kukulkan's signalling device. He orders Bones and Scotty to turn huge serpent-headed statues toward the pyramid. In doing so, the now focused sunlight ignites the signalling device. Kukulkan responds, "Behold, my design is complete. See me now with your own eyes!"

Kukulkan does appear and turns out to be an alien winged serpent.

The city disappears, only to make the group realize that they were never really there. They now realize that the collection of animals they see before them in small glass "cages" was exactly how they experienced the city. The animals are unaware of being on Kukulkan's ship, much as the group thought they were actually in an ancient city.

Kukulkan demands that the humans worship him, just as the ancients on Earth did. He grows angry when Kirk explains that mankind has "grown up" and no longer needs to worship him.

In the meantime, Science Officer Spock has figured out a way to release the Enterprise from Kukulkan's beam and breaks free. This, too, angers Kukulkan who exclaims that he will "smash" the Enterprise. To buy Spock some time, Kirk and Bones decide to break loose a Capellan Power Cat from one of Kukulkan's glass cages. The distraction works, as the Enterprise is able to use its phasers to disable Kukulkan's ship.

With the Power Cat threatening Kukulkan, Kirk leaps at the animal and is able to sedate it with a hypo. Kirk again attempts to reason with Kukulkan, conceding that while the alien did help humanity when it needed it, they no longer need his guidance. The alien reluctantly agrees, and departs.

== Production ==
Russel Bates knew the series' story editor, D. C. Fontana, through Star Trek: The Original Series producer Gene L. Coon, under whom Bates had apprenticed. Fontana told Bates about The Animated Series, asking him to try writing something for it. Bates did pitch several stories for the show's first season, but all of them were rejected. Bates met David Wise at the Clarion Science Fiction Writer's Workshop. Wise suggested that after the workshop was over they collaborate to try to sell a story for Star Trek.

Bates was a Kiowa, and the story incorporated Native American elements.

== Reception ==
This episode won a Daytime Emmy Award for Outstanding Entertainment Children's Series in 1975. This made it the first Star Trek episode to win an Emmy award.

== See also ==
- "Who Mourns for Adonais?" – An Original Series episode about an alien that had long ago visited Earth and now demands worship as a god by the Enterprise crew.
- Star Trek V: The Final Frontier – A motion picture in which the Enterprise encounters a being asserting himself to be the God of Abraham (among others).
