= Little Wizards =

- Created by: Len Janson; Chuck Menville
- Starring: Charles Adler; Joey Camen; Peter Cullen; Katie Leigh; Danny Mann; Scott Menville; Amber Souza; Frank Welker
- Composers: Haim Saban; Shuki Levy
- Country of origin: United States
- Original language: English
- No. of seasons: 1
- No. of episodes: 13

Production
- Executive producers: Lee Gunther; Margaret Loesch
- Producer: Marija Miletic Daïl
- Running time: 30 minutes
- Production company: Marvel Productions

Original release
- Network: ABC
- Release: September 26, 1987 – 1988

Little Wizards, also called Young Wizards, is a 1987–1988 American animated series, created by Len Janson and Chuck Menville and produced by Marvel Productions and New World Pictures.

Ownership of the series passed to Disney in 2001 when Disney acquired Fox Kids Worldwide, which also includes Marvel Productions. The series is not available on Disney+.

== Plot ==
The series follows the fortunes of Dexter, a young prince without a crown, whose father, the old king, is dead. Soon after that, the evil wizard Renvick stole the crown and proclaimed himself king. He ordered his servants to imprison Dexter for fear that he would get in his way. Dexter, however, fled into the woods, where he was found by the good magician Phineas, who rescues him. Phineas lives with a young dragon called Lulu. When preparing a potion, Dexter unwittingly caused an explosion bringing to life three monsters endowed with magical powers – Winkle, Gump and Boo.

== Characters ==
=== Main ===
- Dexter is a young prince without a crown, whose father, the former king is dead. He fled into the woods, where he was rescued by the good magician and teacher Phineas. He won a singing sword.
- Phineas Willodium is a magician and teacher who saved Dexter from the hands of the evil wizard Renvick.
- Lulu is Phineas' dragon.
- Three monsters were accidentally created by Dexter:
  - Winkle is a cheerful, childlike pink monster who can make herself fly after taking a deep breath.
  - Gump is a grumpy orange monster who can shapeshift into other objects, but still retains many of his own features.
  - Boo is a timid, cowardly blue monster who can turn invisible, except for his eyes.
- Renvick is an evil wizard who stole the crown from the late king and proclaimed himself king. He hates Phineas and the Little Wizards. He wants to defeat them no matter the cost, but he rarely succeeds.

=== Recurring ===
- Clovie is a young servant girl. She holds the secret to Renvick and her mother and she helps the Little Wizards. She is probably in love with Dexter.
- William is Clovie's pet sparrow.

== Production ==
Len Janson and Check Menville created the show for Marvel Productions and developing it for ABC, who had brought in consulting company Q5 Corporation to help develop the show along with other series for the 1987–1988 season. Q5's consultants consist of psychology PhDs and advertising, marketing and research professionals.

The show was promoted as a part of the third annual ABC Family Fun Fair, which brought the voice talent of the characters to perform highlights of their show. The show stopped in Oklahoma City on August 28-30, 1987.

== Episodes ==
| No. | Title |
|---|---|
| 1 | "The Singing Sword" |
| 2 | "The Ugly Elfling" |
| 3 | "Everything's Ducky" |
| 4 | "Zapped From The Future" |
| 5 | "I Remember Mama" |
| 6 | "The Unicorn's Nada" |
| 7 | "A Little Trouble" |
| 8 | "A Dragon Tale" |
| 9 | "Things That Go Gump in the Night" |
| 10 | "The Gump Who Would Be King" |
| 11 | "Puff-Pod Blues" |
| 12 | "Boo's Boyfriend" |
| 13 | "Big Gump's Don't Cry" |
Prince Dexter is turned into a frog.
