= Wheelie and the Chopper Bunch =

American animated television series

- Title card
- Genre: Comedy
- Directed by: Charles A. Nichols
- Voices of: Frank Welker; Judy Strangis; Paul Winchell; Lennie Weinrib; Don Messick
- Theme music composer: Hoyt Curtin
- Composer: Hoyt Curtin
- Country of origin: United States
- Original language: English
- No. of seasons: 1
- No. of episodes: 13 (39 segments)

Production
- Executive producers: William Hanna; Joseph Barbera
- Producer: Iwao Takamoto
- Running time: 30 minutes
- Production company: Hanna-Barbera Productions

Original release
- Network: NBC
- Release: September 7 – November 30, 1974

Wheelie and the Chopper Bunch is an American animated television series, produced by Hanna-Barbera, which originally aired for one season on NBC from September 7 to November 30, 1974. The show aired for 13 half-hour episodes.

With an ensemble voice cast consisting of Frank Welker, Judy Strangis, Don Messick, Paul Winchell and Lennie Weinrib, the show follows an anthropomorphic car named Wheelie and a trouble-making motorcycle gang called the "Chopper Bunch".

The series was produced by Iwao Takamoto, executively produced by William Hanna and Joseph Barbera and directed by Charles A. Nichols. An accompanying comic book series, with contributions from artists Joe Staton and John Byrne, debuted in May 1975, although Byrne quit while finishing his second issue as he was unsatisfied with his creative control and felt he was overcompensated for his work. Other artists completed the series, which totaled seven comic books.

This series was commonly grouped together with Speed Buggy (1973) and Wonder Wheels (1977–78) due to the similarities in plot and characters. Reception-wise, several critics reacted negatively to the violence and portrayal of motorcycles in the series, prompting viewers to write letters to NBC in hopes that the show would be pulled off the air. It has since been released on DVD as part of Warner Bros.' Archive Collection on a three-disc set.

== Premise ==
The series takes place in a world of anthropomorphic vehicles and centers on Wheelie, his girlfriend Rota Ree, and a motorcycle gang known as the Chopper Bunch. A writer for Cycle World described the premise of the show: "Wheelie, a car, is the hero, and the villains are a bunch of choppers who do everything dirty to get Wheelie, the clean, all-American car." Nearly every episode of the series focuses on the Chopper Bunch attempting to outsmart Wheelie, despite their continual failed attempts. The show negatively depicted motorcycles and motorcyclists, and the Chopper Bunch typically received terrible consequences for their actions, which sometimes involved the police.

== Characters ==
=== Main ===
- Wheelie (vocal effects provided by Frank Welker) is a red racing/stunt car resembling a Volkswagen Beetle. Depicted as heroic with humanlike capabilities, Wheelie often finds himself having to contend with the Chopper Bunch, a group of hoodlum motorcycles. Wheelie can only communicate in car horn 'beeps' and 'honks' that the other characters can understand, and also in words and symbols that flash on his windshield, including "Charge!" (accompanied by a bugle call and group shout) whenever he is aroused or angered. Wheelie is also equipped with mechanical hands that can produce any item he needs from his trunk.
- Rota Ree (voiced by Judy Strangis) is Wheelie's devoted girlfriend who is frequently subjected to the unwanted affections of Chopper.
- The Chopper Bunch is a gang of motorcycles.
  - Chopper (voiced by Frank Welker) is the leader of the Chopper Bunch and the show's primary antagonist. He is jealous of Wheelie and wants only to get rid of him or at least make his life miserable, and to steal Rota Ree for himself.
  - Revs (voiced by Paul Winchell) is a member of the Chopper Bunch who always talks in spoonerisms. Winchell's performance was very similar to that of the original Scrubbing Bubbles TV commercials from 1973.
  - Hi-Riser (voiced by Lennie Weinrib) is the tallest of the Chopper Bunch, but with the lowest IQ.
  - Scrambles (voiced by Don Messick) is a minibike and the smallest and slowest member of the Chopper Bunch. He is also the one who constantly advises against most of the Bunch's schemes, but Chopper never listens to him until after the fact, at which point Scrambles endlessly shouts "Itoldja! Itoldja! Itoldja!".

=== Other ===
- Captain Tuff (voiced by Paul Winchell) is a hardened, no-nonsense police cruiser who is often seen working to keep the Chopper Bunch in line.
- Deputy Fishtail (voiced by Don Messick) is a police motorcycle and eager rookie obsessed with catching the Chopper Bunch, but whose attempts usually wind up ensnaring Captain Tuff instead.

== Production ==
Wheelie and the Chopper Bunch premiered in September 1974, about one year after the debut of Speed Buggy, another Hanna-Barbera cartoon with similar themes. Executively produced by William Hanna and Joseph Barbera's Hanna-Barbera Productions, Charles A. Nichols served as the series' director. Several writers contributed to the series, including Lars Bourne, Len Janson, Chuck Menville, Robert Ogle, and Dalton Sandifer. The show's official theme song was composed by Hoyt Curtin, Barbera, and Hanna. Curtin also served as the series' music composer. Iwao Takamoto, who had previously worked on several series for Hanna-Barbera productions in the past, solely produced Wheelie and the Chopper Bunch.

Like other animated series created by Hanna-Barbera in the 1970s, the show contained a laugh track created by the studio.

=== Broadcast history ===
Wheelie and the Chopper Bunch was broadcast on NBC as part of their Saturday morning children's lineup between September 7 and November 30, 1974; and before being cancelled, it continued to air regularly on the network until August 30, 1975. The series featured a total of 13 episodes with three segments each, bringing a total of 39 segments overall. During its original allocated time slot, the show rivaled The Bugs Bunny Show on ABC and repeats of Scooby-Doo, Where Are You! on CBS; it also aired immediately following reruns of the animated adaptation of The Addams Family and right before Emergency +4 on NBC.

In syndication, the series was replayed on several television networks after its cancellation. USA Network ran the series beginning May 16, 1989 and until March 28, 1991. Sister channels Cartoon Network and Boomerang have broadcast Wheelie and the Chopper Bunch on multiple occasions since their initial launch; the former began reruns in 1995, while the latter started in 2000. The episode featuring "Double Cross Country", "The Infiltrator", and "The Stunt Show" was featured on the Warner Bros. Presents DVD compilation Saturday Morning Cartoons – 1970's Volume 1 and released on May 26, 2009. As part of the Warner Bros. Television Distribution's Archive Collection, the complete Wheelie and the Chopper Bunch series was made available on DVD as a three-disc set. The first four episodes are not shown in broadcast order.

=== Comic book series ===
In 1975, comic book artists Joe Staton and John Byrne were commissioned to create a series of books to coincide with broadcasts of the series. Published by Charlton Comics, it would also serve as Staton's and Byrne's first series of comic books. After the first issue (with art by Staton) was distributed in May 1975, Hanna-Barbera asked Byrne to create a mellower second issue, as the debut was considered "too scary" by executives. The second issue discouraged Byrne from continuing with the series, so he left after just two issues. Byrne also said he also felt wrong accepting the large amounts of money from Hanna-Barbera, which he stated was $50.00 per page. The series continued with other artists. A total of seven issues were made, with the final one circulating in July 1976.

== Episodes ==
No.	Title	Original release date
1	"Get a Doctor" / "A Day at the Beach" / "Ghost Riders"	September 7, 1974
Get a Doctor: To mess with Wheelie, the Chopper Bunch persuades him to believe that he is greatly ill and needs to visit the doctor, despite being in perfect health. A Day at the Beach: Rota Ree and Wheelie visit the beach for a day of relaxation, which is interrupted by the Chopper Bunch. Ghost Riders: After the death of his uncle, Wheelie inherits a junkyard which he plans to operate; however, Chopper is jealous of the acquired business and plans to scare Wheelie away and run it himself.
2	"Double Cross Country" / "The Infiltrator" / "The Stunt Show"	September 14, 1974
Double Cross Country: In a motor race where a date with Rota Ree is the grand prize, both Wheelie and Chopper enter in hopes of winning first. The Infiltrator: C.C., the newest member of the Chopper Bunch, is asked to spy on, and set traps for, Wheelie. The Stunt Show: Chopper, jealous that Wheelie is the main act in a stunt show, plans to ruin the event in order to make Wheelie look bad.
3	"Razzle Dazzle Paint Job" / "The Autolympics" / "The Delivery Service"	September 21, 1974
Razzle Dazzle Paint Job: Wheelie wins a complimentary paint job ticket at a local paint shop, so Chopper plots to steal the ticket and get the deal for himself. The Autolympics: During the Autolympics, Chopper hopes to ruin Wheelie's chances of winning a gold medal by sabotaging the event. The Delivery Service: Rota Ree's uncle, a delivery truck, is unable to delivery his goods to their rightful owners because he is ill, so Wheelie promises to help out, despite Chopper's desire to delay the deliveries.
4	"The Big Bumper" / "Surprise Party" / "On the Town"	September 28, 1974
The Big Bumper: Chopper befriends the Big Bumper and asks him to ruin Wheelie's life, much to Wheelie's dismay. Surprise Party: In an effort to make amends, Chopper suggests a truce between himself and Wheelie, although Wheelie cannot tell if the offer is genuine or not. On the Town: After being upset one too many times, Wheelie chases the Chopper Bunch around town with the help of Captain Tuff and Fishtail.
5	"Black Belt Fuji" / "Our Hero" / "Wheelie Goes Hawaiian"	October 5, 1974
Black Belt Fuji: An Oriental car named Black Belt Fuji visits Motor City and has Wheelie show him around town, despite Chopper's attempts to mess up the tour. Our Hero: A scooter named Susie becomes lost, so the "Rescue Squad" and Wheelie decide to locate and save her before Chopper can and thus receive all of the credit. Wheelie Goes Hawaiian: Wheelie and Rota Ree travel to Hawaii to compete in a race that Chopper enters just to annoy Wheelie.
6	"The Inspection" / "The Old Timer" / "The Copter Caper"	October 12, 1974
The Inspection: Chopper and his friends plan to ruin a mandatory inspection that Fishtail has prepared for Wheelie to pass. The Old Timer: While escaping the Chopper Bunch, Wheelie finds an old car in need of help, but also needs to stay hidden from Chopper. The Copter Caper: Wheelie and Rota Ree go on a picnic that is interrupted by a police helicopter that is actively searching for Chopper and his friends.
7	"Dr. Crankenstein" / "Bulldozer Buddy" / "Happy Birthday, Wheelie"	October 19, 1974
Dr. Crankenstein: Doctor Crankenstein, a psychotic scientist, creates a monster car named Moto, but needs the brain of another vehicle in order to control it, so he hopes to capture either Wheelie or Chopper. Bulldozer Buddy: Wheelie becomes acquainted with a friendly bulldozer, who promises to help Wheelie when he is in trouble with Chopper. Happy Birthday, Wheelie: On Wheelie's birthday, Rota Ree and he visit an amusement park, while Captain Tuff and Fishtail hope to capture Chopper to prevent any chaos.
8	"Wheelie, the Super Star" / "Down on the Farm" / "Roadeo"	October 26, 1974
Wheelie, the Super Star: On the set of a movie, Chopper decides to sabotage Wheelie's position as a stunt double during one of the scenes. Down on the Farm: Rota Ree's uncle is unable to maintain his farm for a brief period, so Wheelie fills in for him and completes his chores. Roadeo: Both Wheelie and Chopper decide to enter a local rodeo, much to the dismay of Wheelie.
9	"Carfucious Says" / "Mighty Wheelie" / "Camping with a Go Go""	November 2, 1974
Carfucious Says: After Wheelie befriends a new car named Carfucious, the Chopper Bunch decides to try to ruin the newfound friendship. Mighty Wheelie: Wheelie decides to take it upon himself to stand up to the Chopper Bunch. Camping with a Go Go: Rota Ree's nephew, Go Go, goes on a camping trip with his aunt and Wheelie, although Chopper tries to disrupt their fun.
10	"Lenny Van Limousine" / "Snow Foolin" / "Wheelie in Paris"	November 9, 1974
Lenny Van Limousine: A rich vehicle named Lenny Van Limousine pays Chopper to force Rota Ree to go on a date with Lenny, despite her relationship with Wheelie. Snow Foolin' : Wheelie plans to have fun during a snowstorm, which Chopper has decided to ruin. Wheelie in Paris: At the Grand Prix in Paris, Wheelie is running late to the event, so Chopper attempts to make him miss it completely.
11	"Dragster Net" / "Dragula" / "Boot Camp"	November 16, 1974
Dragster Net: In the town of Motor City, Deputy Fishtail and Captain Tuff try to find the perpetrators of a series of robberies throughout the community. Dragula: A vampire drag race car who is capable of transforming into a vampire bat relentlessly tries to feed on the oil of other vehicles, including Wheelie. Boot Camp: After enlisting in the army, the Chopper Bunch pursues Wheelie in hopes that he will get in trouble during basic training.
12	"Dr. Cykll and Mr. Ryde" / "Johnny Crash" / "Wheelie and the Smoke Eater"	November 23, 1974
Dr. Cykll and Mr. Ryde: Wheelie goes to see Dr. Cykll for his annual checkup, unaware that the good doctor has concocted a potion that he drinks to turn himself into Mr. Ride. Johnny Crash: Chopper finds out that Wheelie has been invited to be a guest on the Johnny Crash Show and decides to ruin the appearance. Wheelie and the Smoke Eater: Acting as a firefighter, Wheelie learns that the Chopper Bunch reaches out similarly in order to upstage him.
13	"Friday the Thirteenth" / "Wings of Wheelie" / "Wheelie's Clean Sweep"	November 30, 1974
Friday the Thirteenth: It is Friday the 13th and Wheelie is worried that the Chopper Bunch will try their best to scare him. Wings of Wheelie: Wheelie, wanting to learn how to fly, decides to take lessons which are interrupted by the Chopper Bunch, hoping that he will crash while practicing. Wheelie's Clean Sweep: Filling in for Rota Ree's dad, who is a street sweeper, Wheelie cleans the streets of Motor City, unbeknownst to the fact that Chopper is watching his every move.

== Other appearances ==
- Hi-Riser (voiced by Maurice LaMarche) makes a cameo in the Harvey Birdman, Attorney at Law episode "SPF".
- Wheelie (voiced by Brian Posehn) appears in the Jellystone! episode "Third Wheelie". Unlike the original version, Wheelie actually talks.

== Reception ==
=== Critical response ===
"I have written to NBC suggesting the harm that exists in this program and telling them about who really rides motorcycles and how this myth they are perpetuating effects us on the road. I suggest that you and your readers watch this show, then write letters, many letters, to NBC."

— Additional comments from Van Duson, a viewer who was concerned about the series' negative depictions of motorcycles and motorcyclists.

Following the initial debut of the series, it received criticism and negative feedback on several aspects. Jack Anderson and Les Whitten, journalists for The Sumter Daily Item, felt that several animated television shows on NBC embodied too much violence, and listed Wheelie and the Chopper Bunch, Speed Buggy, The Pink Panther, and Bugs Bunny as the most "aggressive" ones on the channel. In their concerns, they claimed that children watching the series were more likely to be prone to negative "social behavior" around others. Ultimately, the two recommended that younger viewers watch Hanna-Barbera's Devlin due to its inclusion of "no aggression, [...] altruism, and [...] acts of sympathy explaining feelings".

A more unusual form of criticism came from the motorcyclist community. In response to the motorcycles being negatively depicted on the show, a concerned viewer named Eric L. Van Duson wrote to Cycle in 1975 expressing disgust. He claimed that the portrayals of motorcycles could perhaps "brainwash [...] little kids" into thinking that motorcyclists are "nasty". Reacting to Hanna-Barbera creating several series with vehicles serving as the main characters, such as Wheelie and the Chopper Bunch, author David Perlmutter found the use of "humanized automobiles" to be too predictable and repetitive. However, in a retrospective view of older cartoons, the staff at MeTV included the show on their list of "15 Forgotten Cartoons from the Early 1970s You Used to Love".

=== Legacy ===
Along with Speed Buggy and Wonder Wheels, Wheelie and the Chopper Bunch was one of the many Hanna-Barbera productions that incorporated automobiles able to talk and act like humans into animation; these three shows were dubbed together as a "trilogy" by Perlmutter. Additionally, it was listed as "the precursor to the numerous series featuring vehicles as super-heroes" that would arrive on television in both the 1980s and the 1990s. On the 2003 compilation album Cartoon Network: Toon-a-Rama, the official theme song for Wheelie and the Chopper Bunch was included on the track listing.

Wheelie appears in the Jellystone! episode "Third Wheelie", voiced by Brian Posehn. Unlike the original cartoon, this version of Wheelie can speak.
