= The Eye of the Beholder (Star Trek: The Animated Series) =

- Star Trek: The Animated Series episode
- Episode no.: Season 1 Episode 15
- Directed by: Hal Sutherland
- Written by: David P. Harmon
- Production code: 22016
- Original air date: January 5, 1974

Episode chronology
← Previous "The Slaver Weapon"	Next → "The Jihad"

"The Eye of the Beholder" is the fifteenth and penultimate episode of the first season of the American animated science fiction television series Star Trek: The Animated Series. It first aired in the NBC Saturday morning lineup on January 5, 1974, and was written by David P. Harmon. (Note: This episode was expanded, becoming the first half of a full-length novel by science-fiction author Alan Dean Foster printed under the title Star Trek Log Eight (1978) (ISBN 0-345-25141-5).) Harmon also worked on the original Star Trek series, writing the episode "The Deadly Years" and co-writing "A Piece of the Action" with Gene L. Coon.

In this episode, while investigating the disappearance of a Federation starship, the Enterprise command crew become imprisoned as part of an exhibit in an alien zoo.

== Plot ==
The USS Enterprise investigates the disappearance of a scientific team near Lactra VII. The starship Ariel is located there, abandoned, with its captain having transported to the planet's surface.

The Enterprise crew beams down to discover a series of unusual environments and are captured by the Lactrans, large sluglike beings with intellectual capacities far beyond their own. Science Officer Spock senses that they are telepathic but communicating at a speed too fast to comprehend. The team is installed in a zoo collection with the surviving crewmembers of the Ariel, one of whom is deathly ill. Enterprise Chief Medical Officer Dr. McCoy determines he could cure her if he had his medical kit, which has been confiscated along with their phasers and communicators. After the Ariel crew informs him that the Lactrans attempt to fulfill their captives' needs in response to impressions they pick up in their thoughts, Captain Kirk directs everyone to focus on the mental image of McCoy's medical kit. The Lactrans give them the kit and McCoy treats their comrade.

Kirk suggests similarly focusing on a communicator as an object they direly need. A young Lactran responds, and Kirk calls the Enterprise for a beam-up. The youngster snatches away the communicator, and is beamed aboard the ship in their place. The adult Lactrans, upset that their child has disappeared, focus their telepathic energy on Kirk, seeking an explanation. Due to the speed of their thoughts, this runs the risk of destroying Kirk's mind, so the other Starfleet officers project a mental barrier to protect Kirk.

Aboard the Enterprise, the youth probes Chief Engineer Scott's mind and processes the ship's entire library system. It proceeds to take the Enterprise galloping out of orbit. The child beams back down with Scotty. The youngster communicates what it has learned, and the adults decide that although still primitive, humans and Vulcans are in the process of evolving to a higher order, and are set free with a message that they will be welcome back in a number of centuries.

== Casting ==
- In addition to his regular character of Chief Engineer Montgomery Scott, actor James Doohan also voices the Ariel skipper, Lt. Cdr. Tom Markel. Majel Barrett supplies only the voices of Enterprise Communications Officer Lt. M'Ress and Ariel Biologist Randi Bryce.
- Although given screen credit, George Takei and Nichelle Nichols are not part of this episode.

== Reception ==
Michelle Erica Green writing for TrekToday said it felt "redundant throughout, with a plot borrowed from 'The Menagerie'." While she granted that it was an "entertaining episode visually," Green called the "plot and characterization...a mess," but qualified that "these cartoons for kids have some little moral or message at the end," which was that it points "out that different intelligences work in different ways and mutual respect is preferable to condescension"

Jamahl Epsicokhan at Jammer's Reviews gave two of four stars to the episode that he grants has a "certain appeal" on "how the mystery slowly plays out." Although for Epsicokhan, "things get hazy and the show falls apart" because the so-called telepathic aliens somehow "don't realize that [they are] negatively affecting sentient life?" He further called it a "comedy of errors" when the "alien child is beamed aboard the Enterprise" and Scotty "inexplicably takes the thing to the bridge, where it [seizes] control of the ship," which he described as "really goofy and poorly staged."

== Novelization ==
The Alan Dean Foster novelization of this story (Star Trek Log Eight), modifies the ending slightly by putting a condition on the release of Kirk and the others, namely that in exchange, the Enterprise will help the Lactrans locate another alien race that they had known long ago. To this end, two adult Lactrans and their child (who has befriended Scotty) will beam aboard for the journey. This segues into the second half of the novel.

== See also ==
- "The Cage" - The Original Series pilot where humans are also kept as exhibits in an alien zoo.
