= The Counter-Clock Incident =

- Star Trek: The Animated Series episode
- Episode no.: Season 2 Episode 6
- Directed by: Bill Reed
- Written by: John Culver
- Production code: 22023
- Original air date: October 12, 1974

Episode chronology
← Previous "How Sharper Than a Serpent's Tooth"	Next → —

"The Counter-Clock Incident" is the series finale of the American animated science fiction television series Star Trek: The Animated Series, the 22nd episode overall. This episode was the sixth and final episode of the second season. It first aired in the NBC Saturday morning lineup on October 12, 1974, and was written by Fred Bronson under the pen name "John Culver". Bronson used a pen name because he was NBC's publicist at the time and was concerned that it would look improper to get a screen credit. Bronson would eventually work on two Next Generation episodes ("Ménage à Troi" and "The Game").

The episode established that the Enterprise's first captain was Robert April.

Set in the 23rd century, the series follows the adventures of Captain James T. Kirk (voiced by William Shatner) and the crew of the Starfleet starship Enterprise. In this episode, the Enterprise is unwillingly pulled by a smaller craft into the heart of a supernova and finds itself in another universe.

== Plot ==
On stardate 6770.3, the Federation starship Enterprise is transporting very distinguished guests: its first commander, Commodore Robert April (voiced by James Doohan), and his wife, Sarah (voiced by Nichelle Nichols), the first medical officer on the starship equipped with warp drive, who had designed many of the tools in Dr. McCoy's sick bay. Their destination is a diplomatic conference on the planet Babel and his planned retirement ceremony, when it encounters a ship flying at fantastic speeds directly into a supernova.

The Enterprise attempts to assist by grabbing the vessel with a tractor beam and locking onto it, but instead both ships are pulled through the supernova and into a negative universe where time flows backwards and "everything works in a counterclockwise fashion." Consequently, everyone aboard the ship begins to grow younger. The young woman piloting the ship, Karla Five (also voiced by Nichols), takes them to her homeworld, Arret (Terra, backwards), and seeks the help of her son, a much older man named Karl Four (also voiced by Doohan).

In a race against time for the increasingly de-aging Enterprise crew, they work out a solution for getting back home. With Captain Kirk and his crew members reduced to children, Robert April takes control of the Enterprise and leads the ship to safety. The attempt to return home is successful, and April and his wife, Sarah, use the transporter to restore themselves and the rest of the crew to their proper ages.

== Casting ==
Actress Majel Barrett, who commonly voiced Nurse Christine Chapel, Communications Officer M'Ress and the Enterprise computer, was given screen credit for this episode but was not part of it.

== Novelization ==
Science fiction author Alan Dean Foster expanded this story under the title Star Trek Log Seven, making it the first third of a full novel. He prefaced the animated story with scenes depicting a young Starfleet officer named Robert April being shown Matt Jefferies' original blueprints for a then-uncompleted Enterprise and being told he was to be given command of the new ship, then following through to the christening of the Enterprise and Captain April giving the order to embark on their first mission.

At the conclusion of the material from the animated episode, Foster adds new story about the Enterprise being sent on a mission to secure a reclusive brother-sister team of scientists who are reported to have a new weapon capable of destroying planets. In the process, Kirk runs up against Klingons intent on acquiring the scientists for the Empire and must contend with Captain Kumara, whom he had known back in his Academy days. Foster concluded his story by revealing that the Enterprise's adventure with the Klingons had been a test by an advanced alien race calling themselves "The Wanderers". In fact, all of the inhabitants of the planet on which they had found themselves as well as the brother-sister scientists were actually members of the Wanderers. During this revelation, they discuss the illogical nature of the other universe where a society would begin with all possible knowledge that they would ever have and then de-evolve, or how a person would be "born" as a senile old person in a grave and then die in their mother's womb.

== Reception ==
Mark A. Altman and Ed Gross commented that the episode's premise "works far better than it has a right to, thanks to its message that the elderly have a lot to teach us and can be productive members of society." They added that the script "features the same wit and intelligence that characterised the animated missions throughout its two-year run."

This episode was noted as case where the fictional Star Trek transporter technology changes the size of the entity being transported, along with "The Terratin Incident" from the same TV series.

TheGamer.com ranked Captain April as the 10th best captain of Star Trek. In 2019, Den of Geek ranked this the 3rd best morality play of the entire Star Trek franchise.

In 2020, ScreenRant said this was "not a bad episode" but that it was "somewhat goofy" and noted an IMDB rating of 7.1 out of 10 at that time.

== See also ==
- "Too Short a Season" - a first season episode of Star Trek: The Next Generation where a Starfleet admiral reverses his aging
- "Rascals" - a sixth season episode of Star Trek: The Next Generation where crew members are reverted to an earlier age
- "Innocence" - a second season episode of Star Trek: Voyager that deals with an alien race that de-ages as they progress through life
