= Bem (Star Trek: The Animated Series) =

- Star Trek: The Animated Series episode
- Episode no.: Season 2 Episode 2
- Directed by: Bill Reed
- Written by: David Gerrold
- Production code: 22018
- Original air date: 14 September 1974

Episode chronology
← Previous "The Pirates of Orion"	Next → "The Practical Joker"

"Bem" is the second episode of the second season of the American animated science fiction television series Star Trek: The Animated Series, the 18th episode overall. It first aired in the NBC Saturday morning lineup on 14 September 1974, and was written by David Gerrold, who wrote the earlier episode "More Tribbles, More Troubles" and worked on several Original Series episodes.

In this episode, the Enterprise crew must cope with a diplomatically sensitive issue involving a guest officer who meddles in a crucial mission.

This marks the first time that Captain James T. Kirk's full name is given, revealing that the middle initial stood for Tiberius, after the Roman emperor.

== Plot ==
On stardate 7403.6, the Federation starship Enterprise crew is conducting a series of exploratory missions with honorary Commander Ari bn Bem, a representative from the newly contacted planet Pandro, who is working for his government as an independent observer of the Federation.

Bem accompanies a landing party on a mission to a newly discovered planet. Instead of observing, however, he begins to interfere with the mission.

Before long, Captain Kirk and his people are captured by primitive natives. They soon learn that these primitives are under the guardianship of a powerful non-corporeal entity who is upset that the Enterprise crew has come to her planet and interfered with her "children".

== Production ==
The writer of the episode, David Gerrold won both Hugo and Nebula awards for science fiction, and also wrote the episode "More Tribbles, More Troubles" for this series.

"Bem" began as a script for Star Trek: The Original Series' third season, it was condensed for The Animated Series' first season, and was finally produced during the show's second season.

== Reception ==
Michelle Erica Green, in her 2011 TrekToday Retro Review said, "Conceptually" it was "a very interesting episode with a lot going on" such as the "cranky" colony creature, the "intelligent but primitive dinosaur 'aborigines'" who build prisons but whose language "is too unusual for the Universal Translator," a "godlike alien," and other "volatile situations" such as "an accidental first contact." Green felt that "none of it feels recycled" but rather that "the situation" turns out "entirely different than one might have expected from previous episodes." Even so, she said, "I don’t love this episode...despite the enjoyable pacing and some quick-witted dialogue," citing too much technobabble, and that "so much of the regular cast gets short shrift – McCoy and Chapel are absent, Scotty and Sulu serve as plot devices, Uhura has little to contribute," and that Kirk allowed Bem to "beam down to a planet with a pre-warp culture of unknown strength and intelligence," which was clearly a violation of the Prime Directive. However, Green appreciated "lots of giggle moments" and "the first pronouncement of James Tiberius Kirk’s full name" which was "not made canon until the original series movies."

In 2017, Tor.com rated this episode 8 out of 10, noting that the Enterprise takes on the passenger Bem and goes to the planet Delta Theta III.

== See also ==
- "Justice" - a Next Generation episode in which the Enterprise encounters a primitive civilization watched over by an alien that the locals believe to be God.
