= Stop Look and Listen (film) =

- Directed by: Len Janson; Chuck Menville
- Written by: Len Janson; Chuck Menville
- Produced by: Len Janson; Chuck Menville
- Starring: Len Janson; Chuck Menville
- Cinematography: David Brain; David McMillan
- Music by: Madge Wilson
- Distributed by: Metro-Goldwyn-Mayer
- Release date: January 1, 1967
- Running time: 10.5 minutes
- Country: United States
- Language: English

Stop Look and Listen is a color, 10-minute 1967 comedy film written, produced, directed by, and starring Len Janson and Chuck Menville. The film was nominated for an Oscar in 1968 (Best Short Subject, Live Action).

== Technique ==
It was mostly filmed in San Fernando Valley in pixilation (stop-motion photography).

== Summary ==
The film generates comedy by contrasting the safe and dangerous styles of two drivers who drive in the way made famous by Harold Lloyd: by sitting in the street and seeming to move their bodies as though they were automobiles.

== See also ==
- List of American films of 1967
