= Fred Bronson =

American journalist and writer

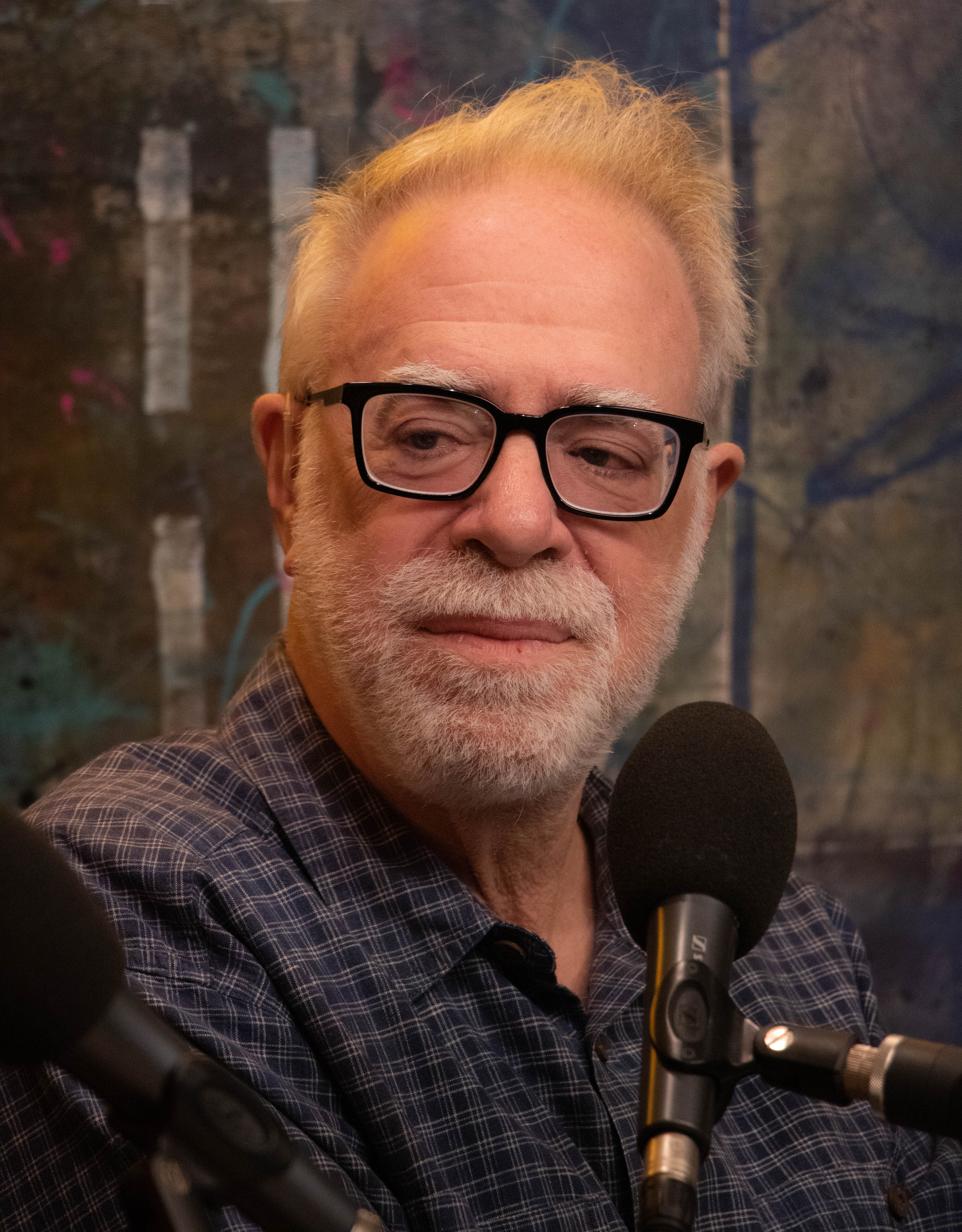
- Bronson in 2024
- Born: Fredric M. Bronson; January 10, 1949 (age 77); Culver City, California, U.S.
- Occupations: Journalist, author, writer

Fredric M. "Fred" Bronson (born January 10, 1949) is an American journalist, author and writer. He is the author of books related to number one songs on the Billboard Hot 100 chart and other books related to various music charts as well. He is also known for his appearances on American Idol and the weekly "Chart Beat" column in Billboard magazine.

The 5th edition of The Billboard Book Of Number One Hits was published in 2003. The 4th edition of Billboard's Hottest Hot 100 Hits was published in 2007. Bronson is also the author of The Billboard Book of Number One R&B Hits (with Adam White), American Bandstand (with Dick Clark) and The Sound of Music Family Scrapbook, written at the behest of the seven actors who played the von Trapp children in the 1965 film.

== Early life ==
Born to Irving and Mildred Bronson and raised in Culver City, California. At age five, he was selected to portray actor/writer/producer Jack Webb as a child in a series of photographs in the May 1954 issue of Cosmopolitan. Bronson showed an early aptitude for gauging the popularity of artists and songs. At age eleven, Bronson won a contest in the Los Angeles Mirror-News requiring him to select favorites in several music categories. His prize was a lunch with actress Connie Stevens. As Bronson later wrote, "I realized that keeping track of records and artists wasn't such a bad idea."

One of Bronson's earliest published works was in the first letters column of The Amazing Spider-Man, in issue 3, published in 1962. A follow-up letter was printed in The Amazing Spider-Man No. 608, published 47 years later. (Note: Also referenced in Amazing Spider-Man No. 600.) His letters were also published on a regular basis in issues of Superman, Action Comics, Adventure Comics, The Flash and other DC Comics publications.

== Career ==
From 1971 to 1982, he was a publicist for NBC-TV in Burbank, California. Bronson handled publicity for a number of TV series, including Sanford and Son, Buck Rogers in the 25th Century, B. J. and the Bear, Man from Atlantis, The Bionic Woman, Police Story, Police Woman, Bonanza, Quark, Joe & Valerie, Voyagers!, The Powers of Matthew Star, Hollywood Squares, The Tomorrow Show with Tom Snyder, and the Bob Hope specials.

Bronson's regular Chart Beat column appeared weekly in Billboard magazine from January 1993, when he took over from Paul Grein who originated the column in March 1981, until April 2005, when it was transferred completely to Billboard.com. The online Chart Beat Chat column appeared at Billboard.com from April 1996 until March 5, 2009. Both dealt with notable activity on the Billboard charts including the Billboard Hot 100 for songs and Billboard 200 for albums. His new Billboard column, This Week In Billboard History, launched on the www.billboard.biz website on December 6, 2011. Bronson also co-created the syndicated comic strip Dick Clark's Rock, Roll & Remember in 1995 with Dick Clark and art work by Don Sherwood.

Bronson has written for numerous award shows including both the World Music Awards and American Music Awards. He has also appeared as a repertoire expert four times on American Idol, during Seasons 2, 4, 7 and 9. He was seen on March 11, 2008, discussing the oeuvre of Lennon–McCartney and on March 23, 2010, talking about the history of Billboard and the Hot 100. He was identified as "Author, Billboard Books." As in episodes from seasons two and four, his Number One Hits book was the exclusive basis of repertoire selection. His book also served as source material for the first episode of CMT's series, CMT's Next Superstar. Bronson appeared on the first episode as a guest judge, along with Kristin Chenoweth and permanent judge Matt Serletic. The series premiered on April 8, 2011, the eighth anniversary of Bronson's first appearance on American Idol.

Bronson's musical preferences were heard on his own radio program Pop Goes the World and the online radio station Radio Fred Bronson. For seven years, he wrote The Billboard Radio Countdown, a weekly webcast hosted by Billboard magazine's writer and editor Chuck Taylor.

Bronson wrote one episode of the Star Trek: The Animated Series, "The Counter-Clock Incident", under the name John Culver. He is also the co-writer on two episodes of Star Trek: The Next Generation: "The Game" and "Ménage à Troi". Other writing credits for television include two-hour tributes to Brooks & Dunn, George Strait, and the superstar women of country music (including Carrie Underwood, Miranda Lambert, Martina McBride, Reba, the Judds, Loretta Lynn and Jennifer Nettles of Sugarland) on "Girls' Night Out" for CBS, a Lionel Richie special that aired in April 2012, a Motown 45th anniversary special, the original Live Aid, and a disco music special for ABC as well as the annual Dick Clark's New Year's Rockin' Eve With Ryan Seacrest, also for ABC. Bronson was head writer on NBC's January 2005 telethon to raise funds for victims of the 2004 tsunami in southeast Asia. For 20 consecutive years, Bronson wrote The American Music Awards.

On March 5, 2009, Bronson announced in his weekly Chart Beat column that it was to be his last. In August 2009, he wrote his first articles for the Los Angeles Times. The latimes.com website posted his interviews with American Idol finalists Adam Lambert, Kris Allen and Allison Iraheta. In 2011, Bronson began writing for Billboard again on a regular basis. His articles appear on the Billboard.biz website. He also writes for The Hollywood Reporter.

Bronson has also conducted interviews for SiriusXM including Paul McCartney, Benny Andersson and Björn Ulvaeus and Ulf Ekberg from Ace of Base. Bronson also announced that he would be a guest on Jon Peter Lewis' internet TV series American Nobody (episode 4 in March 2009).

Bronson was a member of the international jury of Melodifestivalen 2009, national preselection event to choose the Swedish representative in the Eurovision Song Contest 2009.

In August 2012, Bronson began writing a weekly column for The Hollywood Reporter: American Idol on the Charts.
