= Len Janson =

American writer and director

Len Janson is an American writer and director whose career in animated cartoons and live-action motion pictures spanned several decades beginning in the 1960s. He began work as an in-betweener at the Walt Disney cartoon studio. By 1965 he had become a story man with his first screen credit in Rudy Larriva's Boulder Wham!. Soon after, he teamed with Chuck Menville to produce a series of live-action films which used the pixilation technique. An example is Stop Look and Listen. By the early 1970s, Janson and Menville had become major names in the animation industry and welcome storytellers at studios such as Filmation and Hanna-Barbera. Their partnership ended with Menville's death in 1992. Janson remained active for a few more years, mainly as story editor for Sonic the Hedgehog. He also wrote episodes of Baywatch Nights.

== Screenwriting ==
- series head writer denoted in bold

=== Television ===
- Dr. Kildare (1964)
- Cattanooga Cats (1969)
- Sabrina the Teenage Witch (1969-1972)
- Will the Real Jerry Lewis Please Sit Down (1970)
- Groovie Goolies (1970)
- The Flintstone Comedy Hour (1972)
- Fat Albert and the Cosby Kids (1972)
- Lassie's Rescue Rangers (1972-1973)
- Speed Buggy (1973)
- Star Trek: The Animated Series (1973-1974)
- Wheelie and the Chopper Bunch (1974)
- Hong Kong Phooey (1974)
- Korg: 70,000 B.C. (1974)
- Shazam! (1974, 1976)
- Wacky and Packy (1975)
- The New Adventures of Gilligan (1975)
- The Secrets of Isis (1976)
- Ark II (1976)
- Tarzan, Lord of the Jungle (1976-1978)
- The New Adventures of Batman (1977)
- Space Sentinels (1977)
- Tarzan and the Super 7 (1978)
  - **The Freedom Force**
  - Jason of Star Command
  - **Manta and Moray**
  - **Superstretch and Microwoman**
  - **Web Woman**
- Yogi's Space Race (1978)
- Buford and the Galloping Ghost (1979)
- The New Fred and Barney Show (1979)
- The New Shmoo (1979)
- The Gymnast (1980)
- The Flintstone Comedy Show (1980)
- Space Stars (1981)
- The Flintstones: Wind-Up Wilma (1981)
- The Love Boat (1981)
- The Smurfs (1981)
  - The Smurfs Springtime Special (1982)
  - The Smurfs Christmas Special (1982)
  - My Smurfy Valentine (1983)
- Mork & Mindy/Laverne & Shirley/Fonz Hour (1982)
- The Biskitts (1983)
- **Benji, Zax & the Alien Prince** (1983)
- Going Bananas (1984)
- Kissyfur (1985-1986)
- Adderly (1986)
- **The Real Ghostbusters** (1986-1991): head writer (seasons 3–7)
- Little Wizards (1987-1988)
- Slimer! and the Real Ghostbusters (1988-1989)
- ABC Weekend Special
  - P. J. Funnybunny (1989)
  - P. J.’s Unfunnybunny Christmas (1993)
- Tiny Toon Adventures (1990)
- Land of the Lost (1991-1992)
- Solarman (1992)
- Sonic the Hedgehog (1993-1994)
- Dumb and Dumber (1995)
- Baywatch Nights (1995-1996)
- Sonic Underground (1999)
- The New Woody Woodpecker Show (1999)
- Gadget & the Gadgetinis (2003)

=== Films ===
- Stop Look and Listen (1967)
- Daffy Duck and Porky Pig Meet the Groovie Goolies (1972)
- The Hanna-Barbera Hall of Fame: Yabba Dabba Doo II (1979)
