= List of Star Trek composers and music =

Star Trek discography
- Soundtrack albums: 14
- Compilation albums: 6

This is a list of composers of music for the series Star Trek, and other articles about music associated with the franchise.

== Composers ==
The following individuals wrote movie scores, theme music, or incidental music for several episodes or installments of the Star Trek franchise.

Composer	Movie score	Series theme	Incidental music
Paul Baillargeon			Deep Space Nine, Voyager, Enterprise
David Bell			Deep Space Nine, Voyager, Enterprise
Velton Ray Bunch			Enterprise
Jay Chattaway			The Next Generation, Deep Space Nine, Voyager, Enterprise
Alexander Courage		Star Trek: The Original Series	The Original Series, 6 episodes, including both pilots ("The Cage" and "Where No Man Has Gone Before")
George Duning			The Original Series, 6 episodes
Cliff Eidelman	Star Trek VI: The Undiscovered Country		
Jerry Fielding			The Original Series, 2 episodes ("The Trouble With Tribbles" and "Spectre of the Gun")
Gerald Fried			The Original Series, 5 episodes (including "Amok Time," which introduced the famous "Star Trek fight music")
Michael Giacchino	Star Trek; Star Trek Into Darkness; Star Trek Beyond	Prodigy	
Jerry Goldsmith	Star Trek: The Motion Picture; Star Trek V: The Final Frontier; Star Trek: First Contact (with son Joel); Star Trek: Insurrection; Star Trek: Nemesis	The Next Generation; Voyager	
James Horner	Star Trek II: The Wrath of Khan; Star Trek III: The Search for Spock		
Ron Jones			The Next Generation
Sol Kaplan			The Original Series, 2 episodes ("The Enemy Within," "The Doomsday Machine")
Samuel Matlovsky			The Original Series, 1 episode ("I, Mudd")
Dennis McCarthy	Star Trek Generations	Deep Space Nine	The Next Generation, Deep Space Nine, Voyager, Enterprise
Joseph Mullendore			The Original Series, 1 episode ("The Conscience of the King")
Nami Melumad			Short Treks, 1 episode ("Q & A"); Prodigy; Strange New Worlds
Leonard Rosenman	Star Trek IV: The Voyage Home		
Jeff Russo	Star Trek: Section 31	Discovery; Picard; Strange New Worlds; Short Treks; Starfleet Academy	Discovery; Picard; Short Treks (Season 1, Season 2 episode "Children of Mars")
Fred Steiner			The Original Series, 11 episodes; The Next Generation, 1 episode ("Code of Honor")
Diane Warren		Enterprise	
Chris Westlake		Lower Decks	Lower Decks

Other composers who contributed music to at least one episode include Don Davis, John Debney, Brian Tyler, George Romanis, Sahil Jindal, Andrea Datzman, and Kris Bowers.

== Film soundtracks overview ==
Number	Film	Release date	Composer(s)	Soundtrack	Series
1	Star Trek: The Motion Picture	December 7, 1979	Jerry Goldsmith	Soundtrack	The Original Series
2	Star Trek II: The Wrath of Khan	June 4, 1982	James Horner	Soundtrack	The Original Series
3	Star Trek III: The Search for Spock	June 1, 1984	James Horner	Soundtrack	The Original Series
4	Star Trek IV: The Voyage Home	November 26, 1986	Leonard Rosenman	Soundtrack	The Original Series
5	Star Trek V: The Final Frontier	June 9, 1989	Jerry Goldmith	Soundtrack	The Original Series
6	Star Trek VI: The Undiscovered Country	December 6, 1991	Cliff Eidelman	Soundtrack	The Original Series
7	Star Trek Generations	November 18, 1994	Dennis McCarthy	Soundtrack	The Next Generation
8	Star Trek: First Contact	November 22, 1996	Jerry Goldsmith; Joel Goldsmith	Soundtrack	The Next Generation
9	Star Trek: Insurrection	December 11, 1998	Jerry Goldsmith	Soundtrack	The Next Generation
10	Star Trek: Nemesis	December 13, 2002	Jerry Goldsmith	Soundtrack	The Next Generation
11	Star Trek	May 8, 2009	Michael Giacchino	Soundtrack	Reboot cast
12	Star Trek Into Darkness	May 16, 2013	Michael Giacchino	Soundtrack	Reboot cast
13	Star Trek Beyond	July 22, 2016	Michael Giacchino	Soundtrack	Reboot cast
14	Star Trek: Section 31	January 24, 2025	Jeff Russo	Soundtrack	Paramount+

=== The Original Series ===
==== Star Trek: The Motion Picture (1979) ====
The score for Star Trek: The Motion Picture was written by Jerry Goldsmith, who would later compose the scores Star Trek V: The Final Frontier, Star Trek: First Contact, Star Trek: Insurrection, and Star Trek: Nemesis, as well as the themes to the television series Star Trek: The Next Generation and Star Trek: Voyager. Gene Roddenberry had originally wanted Goldsmith to score Star Trek's pilot episode, "The Cage", but the composer was unavailable. When Robert Wise signed on to direct the film, Paramount asked the director if he had any objection to using Goldsmith. Wise, who had worked with the composer for The Sand Pebbles, replied "Hell, no. He's great!" Wise would later consider his work with Goldsmith one of the best relationships he ever had with a composer.

Goldsmith was influenced by the style of the romantic, sweeping music of Star Wars. "When you stop and think about it, space is a very romantic thought. It is, to me, like the Old West, we're up in the universe. It's about discovery and new life [...] it's really the basic premise of Star Trek," he said. Goldsmith's initial bombastic main theme reminded Ramsay and Wise of sailing ships. Unable to articulate what he felt was wrong with the piece, Wise recommended writing an entirely different piece. Although irked by the rejection, Goldsmith consented to re-work his initial ideas. The rewriting of the theme required changes to several sequences Goldsmith had scored without writing the main title piece. The approach of Kirk and Scott to the drydocked Enterprise by shuttle lasted a ponderous five minutes due to the effect shots coming in late and unedited, requiring Goldsmith to maintain interest with a revised and developed cue. Star Trek: The Motion Picture is the only Star Trek film to have a true overture, using "Ilia's Theme" in this role. Star Trek and The Black Hole would be the only feature films to use an overture from the end of 1979 until the year 2000 (with the movie Dancer in the Dark).

Much of the recording equipment used to create the movie's intricately complicated sound effects was, at the time, extremely cutting edge. Among these pieces of equipment was the ADS (Advanced Digital Synthesizer) 11, manufactured by Pasadena, California custom synthesizer manufacturer Con Brio, Inc. The movie provided major publicity and was used to advertise the synthesizer, though no price was given. The film's soundtrack also provided a debut for the Blaster Beam, an electronic instrument 12 to 15 feet (3.7 to 4.6 m) long. It was created by musician Craig Huxley, who played a small role in two episodes of the original television series. The Blaster had steel wires connected to amplifiers fitted to the main piece of aluminum; the device was played with an artillery shell. Goldsmith heard it and immediately decided to use it for V'ger's cues. An enormous pipe organ first plays the V'ger theme on the Enterprise's approach, a literal indication of the machine's power.

Goldsmith scored The Motion Picture over three to four months, a relatively relaxed schedule compared to typical production, but time pressures resulted in Goldsmith bringing on colleagues to assist in the work. Alexander Courage, composer of the original Star Trek theme, provided arrangements to accompany Kirk's log entries, while Fred Steiner wrote the music to accompany the Enterprise achieving warp speed and first meeting V'ger. The rush to finish the rest of the film impacted the score. The final recording session finished at 2:00am on December 1, only five days before the film's release.

A soundtrack featuring the film's music was released in 1979 together with the film debut and was one of Goldsmith's best-selling scores. Sony's Legacy Recordings released an expanded two-disc edition of the soundtrack on November 10, 1998. The album added 21 minutes of music to supplement the original tracklist, and was resequenced to reflect the storyline of the film. The first disc features the expanded score, while the sequence disc contains "Inside Star Trek", a spoken word documentary. In 2012, La-La Land Records released a comprehensive 3 CD special edition which includes the complete score along with alternates and outtakes remastered from restored original 16 track masters, the original digital album master, and popular cover versions of the film's love theme.

==== Star Trek II: The Wrath of Khan (1982) ====
While Jerry Goldsmith had composed the music for The Motion Picture, he was not an option for The Wrath of Khan due to a budget reduction; director Nicholas Meyer's composer for Time After Time, Miklós Rózsa, was likewise prohibitively expensive. Meyer and producer Harve Bennett wanted the music for the sequel to go in a different direction but had not decided on a composer by the time filming began. Initially, Meyer hoped to hire an associate named John Morgan, but Morgan lacked film experience, which would have troubled the studio.

Paramount's vice-president of music Joel Sill took a liking to a 28-year-old composer named James Horner, feeling that his demo tapes stood out from generic film music. Horner was introduced to Bennett, Meyer, and Salin. Horner said that "[The producers] did not want the kind of score they had gotten before. They did not want a John Williams score, per se. They wanted something different, more modern." When asked about how he landed the assignment, the composer replied that "the producers loved my work for Wolfen, and had heard my music for several other projects, and I think, so far as I've been told, they liked my versatility very much. I wanted the assignment, and I met with them, we all got along well, they were impressed with my music, and that's how it happened." Horner agreed with the producers' expectations and agreed to begin work in mid-January 1982.

In keeping with the nautical tone, Meyer wanted music evocative of seafaring and swashbuckling, and the director and composer worked together closely, becoming friends in the process. As a classical music fan, Meyer was able to describe the effects and sounds he wanted in the music. While Horner's style was described as "echoing both the bombastic and elegiac elements of John Williams' Star Wars and Jerry Goldsmith's original Star Trek (The Motion Picture) scores," Horner was expressly told not to use any of Goldsmith's score. Instead, Horner adapted the opening fanfare of Alexander Courage's Star Trek television theme. "The fanfare draws you in immediately—you know you're going to get a good movie," Horner said.

In comparison to the flowing main theme, Khan's leitmotif was designed as a percussive texture that could be overlaid with other music and emphasized the character's insanity. The seven-note brass theme was echoplexed to emphasize the character's ruminations about the past while on Ceti Alpha V, but does not play fully until Reliant's attack on the Enterprise. Many elements drew from Horner's previous work (a rhythm that accompanies Khan's theme during the surprise attack borrows from an attack theme from Wolfen, in turn influenced by Goldsmith's score for Alien. Musical moments from the original television series are also heard during investigation of the Regula space station and elsewhere.

To Horner, the "stuff underneath" the main story was what needed to be addressed by the score; in The Wrath of Khan, this was the relationship between Kirk and Spock. The main theme serves as Kirk's theme, with a mellower section following that is the theme for the Starship Enterprise. Horner also wrote a motif for Spock, to emphasize the character's depth: "By putting a theme over Spock, it warms him and he becomes three-dimensional rather than a collection of schticks." The difference in the short, French horn-based cues for the villain and longer melodies for the heroes helped to differentiate characters and ships during the battle sequences.

The soundtrack was Horner's first major film score, and was written in four and a half weeks. The resulting 72 minutes of music was then performed by a 91-piece orchestra. Recording sessions took place April 12–15 at the Warner Brothers lot, The Burbank Studios. A pickup session was held on April 30 to record music for the Mutara nebula battle, while another session held on May 3 was used to cover the recently changed epilogue. Horner used synthesizers for ancillary effects; at the time, science-fiction films such as E.T. the Extra-Terrestrial and The Thing were eschewing the synthesizer in favor of more traditional orchestras. Craig Huxley performed his invented instrument—the Blaster Beam—during recording, as well as composing and performing electronic music for the Genesis Project video. While most of the film was "locked-in" by the time Horner had begun composing music, he had to change musical cue orchestration after the integration of special effects caused changes in scene durations.

==== Star Trek III: The Search for Spock (1984) ====
Composer James Horner returned to score The Search for Spock, fulfilling a promise he had made to Bennett on The Wrath of Khan. Much like the content of the film, Horner's music was a direct continuation of the score he wrote for the previous film. When writing music for The Wrath of Khan, Horner was aware he would reuse certain cues for an impending sequel; two major themes he reworked were for Genesis and Spock. While the Genesis theme supplants the title music Horner wrote for The Wrath of Khan, the end credits were quoted "almost verbatim".

In hours-long discussions with Bennett and Nimoy, Horner agreed with the director that the "romantic and more sensitive" cues were more important than the "bombastic" ones. Horner had written Spock's theme to give the character more dimension: "By putting a theme over Spock, it warms him and he becomes three-dimensional rather than a collection of schticks," he said. The theme was expanded in The Search for Spock to represent the ancient alien mysticism and culture of Spock and Vulcan.

Among the new cues Horner wrote was a "percussive and atonal" theme for the Klingons which is represented heavily in the film. Jeff Bond described the cue as a compromise between music from Horner's earlier film Wolfen, Khan's motif from The Wrath of Khan, and Jerry Goldsmith's Klingon music from The Motion Picture. Horner also adapted music from Sergei Prokofiev's Romeo and Juliet for part of the Enterprise theft sequence and its destruction, while the scoring to Spock's resurrection on Vulcan draws similarities to Horner's Brainstorm ending.

==== Star Trek IV: The Voyage Home (1986) ====
James Horner, composer for The Wrath of Khan and The Search for Spock, declined to return for The Voyage Home. Because of this Nimoy turned to his friend Leonard Rosenman, who had written the music to, among other films, Fantastic Voyage, Ralph Bakshi's The Lord of the Rings, and two Planet of the Apes sequels. Rosenman wrote an arrangement of Alexander Courage's Star Trek television theme as the title music for The Voyage Home, but Nimoy suggested that he write his own instead. As music critic Jeff Bond writes, "The final result was one of the most unusual Star Trek movie themes," consisting of a six note theme and variations set against a repetitious four note brass motif; the theme's bridge is reminiscent of material in Rosenman's "Frodo March" for The Lord of the Rings. The melody makes appearances in the beginning of the film at Vulcan as well as when Taylor seeks Kirk's help finding her whales.

The Earth-based setting of the filming gave Rosenman leeway to write a variety of music in different styles. Nimoy intended the crew's introduction to the streets of San Francisco to be accompanied by something reminiscent of George Gershwin, but Rosenman changed the director's mind and the scene was scored with a contemporary jazz fusion piece by Yellowjackets. When Chekov flees detention aboard the aircraft carrier, Rosenman wrote a bright cue that incorporated classical Russian compositions, while the escape from the hospital was done in a baroque style. More familiar Rosenman compositions included the action music as the Bird of Prey and a whaling ship face off in open water, while the whale's communication with the probe used atmospheric music reminiscent of the composer's work in Fantastic Voyage. After the probe leaves, the music turns into a Vivaldiesque "whale fugue". The first sighting of the Enterprise-A uses the Alexander Courage theme before the end title music.

Mark Mangini served as The Voyage Home's sound designer. He described it as different from working on many other films because Nimoy appreciated the role of sound effects and made sure that they were prominent in the film. Since many sounds familiar to Star Trek had already been established—the Bird of Prey's cloaking device, the transporter beam, et al.—Mangini focused on making only small changes to them. The most important sounds were those created by the whales and the probe. Mangini's brother lived close to Roger Payne, a biologist who had many recordings of whale song. Mangini went through the tapes and chose sounds that could be mixed to suggest a sort of language and conversation. The probe's screeching calls were the whale song in distorted form. The humpback's communication with the probe at the climax of the film contained no dramatic music, meaning that Mangini's sounds had to stand alone. He recalled that he had some difficulty with envisioning how the scene would unfold, leading Bennett to perform a puppet show to explain. Nimoy and the other producers were unhappy with Mangini's attempts to create the probe's droning operating noise; after 18 attempts, the sound designer finally asked Nimoy what he thought the probe should sound like, and recorded Nimoy's response. Nimoy's voice was distorted with "just the tiniest bit of dressing" and used as the final sound.

The punk music that blares during the bus scene was written by Thatcher after he learned that the audio to be added to the scene would be "Duran Duran, or whoever" and not "raw" and authentic punk. Thatcher collaborated with Mangini and two sound editors (who were in punk bands) to create their own music. They decided that punk distilled down to the sentiment of "I hate you", and wrote a sound to match. Recording in the sound studio as originally planned produced too clean a sound, so they moved to the outside hallway and recorded the entire band in one take using cheap microphones to create the distorted sound intended. The song was later used for Paramount's "Back to the Beach".

==== Star Trek V: The Final Frontier (1989) ====
Music critic Jeff Bond wrote that Shatner made "at least two wise decisions" in making The Final Frontier; he chose Laurence Luckinbill to play the role of Sybok, and he hired Jerry Goldsmith to compose the film's score. Goldsmith had written the Academy Award-nominated score for Star Trek: The Motion Picture, and the new Trek film was an opportunity to craft music with a similar level of ambition while adding action and character—two elements largely missing from The Motion Picture.

Goldsmith's main theme begins with the traditional opening notes from Alexander Courage's original television series theme; an ascending string and electronic bridge leads to a rendition of the march from The Motion Picture. According to Jeff Bond, Goldsmith's use of The Motion Picture's march led to some confusion among Star Trek: The Next Generation fans, as they were unfamiliar with the music's origins and believed that Goldsmith was stealing the theme to The Next Generation, which was itself The Motion Picture march. Another theme from The Motion Picture that makes a return appearance is the Klingon theme from the 1979 film's opening scene. Here, the theme is treated in what Bond termed a "Prokofiev-like style as opposed to the avant-garde counterpoint" as seen in The Motion Picture. Goldsmith also added a crying ram's horn.

The breadth of The Final Frontier's locations led Goldsmith to eschew the two-themed approach of The Motion Picture in favor of leitmotifs, recurring music used for locations and characters. Sybok is introduced with a synthesized motif in the opening scene of the film, while when Kirk and Spock discuss him en route to Nimbus III it is rendered in a more mysterious fashion. The motif also appears in the action cue as Kirk and company land on Nimbus III and try to free the hostages. When Sybok boards the Enterprise, a new four-note motif played by low brass highlights the character's obsession. The Sybok theme from then on is used in either a benevolent sense or a more percussive, dark rendition. Arriving at Sha-ka-ree, the planet's five-note theme bears resemblance to Goldsmith's unicorn theme from Legend; "...the two melodies represent very similar ideas: lost innocence and the tragic impossibility of recapturing paradise," writes Bond. The music features cellos conveying a pious quality, while the appearance of "God" begins with string glissandos but turns to a dark rendition of Sybok's theme as its true nature is exposed. As the creature attacks Kirk, Spock and McCoy, the more aggressive Sybok theme takes on an attacking rhythm. When Spock appeals to the Klingons for help, the theme takes on a sensitive character before returning to a powerful sequence as the ship destroys the god-creature.

==== Star Trek VI: The Undiscovered Country (1991) ====
Director Nicholas Meyer's original plan for the score of The Undiscovered Country was to adapt Gustav Holst's orchestral suite The Planets. The plan proved unfeasibly expensive, so Meyer began listening to demo tapes submitted by composers. Meyer described most of the demos as generic "movie music", but was intrigued by one tape by a young composer named Cliff Eidelman. Eidelman, then 26, had made a career in composing for ballets, television, and film, but despite work on fourteen features, no film had been the hit needed to propel Eidelman to greater fame.

In conversations with Eidelman, Meyer mentioned that since the marches that accompanied the main titles for other Star Trek films were so good, he had no desire to compete with them by composing a bombastic opening. He also felt that since the film was darker than its predecessors, it demanded something different musically as a result. He mentioned the opening to Igor Stravinsky's The Firebird as similar to the foreboding sound he wanted. Two days later Eidelman produced a tape of his idea for the main theme, played on a synthesizer. Meyer was impressed by the speed of the work and the close fit to his vision. Meyer approached producer Steven Charles-Jaffe with Eidelman's CD, which reminded Jaffe of Bernard Herrmann; Eidelman was given the task of composing the score.

Eidelman's previous project had been creating a compilation of music from the past five Star Trek films, and he consciously avoided taking inspiration from those scores. "[The compilation] showed me what to stay away from, because I couldn't do James Horner [composer for The Wrath of Khan and The Search for Spock] as well as James Horner," he said. Since he was hired early on in production, Eidelman had an unusually long time to develop his ideas, and he was able to visit the sets during filming. While the film was in early production Eidelman worked on electronic drafts of the final score, to placate executives who were unsure about using a relatively unknown composer.

Eidelman stated that he finds science fiction the most interesting and exciting genre to compose for, and that Meyer told him to treat the film as a fresh start, rather than drawing on old Star Trek themes. Eidelman wanted the music to aid the visuals; for Rura Penthe, he strove to create an atmosphere that reflected the alien and dangerous setting, introducing exotic instruments for color. Besides using percussion from around the world, Eidelman treated the choir as percussion, with the Klingon language translation for "to be, or not to be" ("taH pagh, taHbe") being repeated in the background. Spock's theme was designed to be an ethereal counterpart to the motif for Kirk and the Enterprise, aimed at capturing "the emotional gleam in the captain's eye". Kirk's internal dilemma about what the future holds was echoed in the main theme: "It's Kirk taking control one last time and as he looks out into the stars he has the spark again [...] But there's an unresolved note, because it's very important that he doesn't trust the Klingons. He doesn't want to go on this trip even though the spark is there that overtook him." For the climactic battle, Eidelman starts the music quietly, building the intensity as the battle progresses.

=== The Next Generation ===
==== Star Trek Generations (1994) ====
Dennis McCarthy, a composer who had worked on The Next Generation, was given the task of composing for Star Trek Generations. Critic Jeff Bond wrote that while McCarthy's score was "tasked with straddling the styles of both series", it also offered the opportunity for the composer to produce stronger dramatic writing. His opening music was an ethereal choral piece that plays while a floating champagne bottle tumbles through space. For the action scenes with the Enterprise-B, McCarthy used low brass chords and touches. Kirk was given a brass motif accented by snare drums (a touch verboten during The Next Generation), while the scene ends with a dissonant note as Scott and Chekov discover Kirk has been blown into space.

McCarthy expanded his brassy style for the film's action sequences, such as the battle over Veridian III and the crash-landing of the Enterprise. For Picard's trip to the Nexus, more choral music and synthesizers accompany Picard's discovery of his family. The film's only distinct theme, a broad fanfare, first plays when Picard and Kirk meet. The theme blends McCarthy's theme for Picard from The Next Generation's first season, notes from the theme for Star Trek: Deep Space Nine, and Alexander Courage's classic Star Trek fanfare.

==== Star Trek: First Contact (1996) ====
Film composer Jerry Goldsmith scored First Contact, his third Star Trek feature. Goldsmith wrote a sweeping main title which begins with Alexander Courage's classic Star Trek fanfare. Instead of composing a menacing theme to underscore the Borg, Goldsmith wrote a pastoral theme linked to humanity's hopeful first contact. The theme uses a four-note motif used in Goldsmith's Star Trek V: The Final Frontier score, which is used in First Contact as a friendship theme and general thematic link. A menacing march with touches of synthesizers was used to represent the Borg. In addition to composing new music, Goldsmith used music from his previous Star Trek scores, including his theme from The Motion Picture. The Klingon theme from the same film is used to represent Worf.

Because of delays with Paramount's The Ghost and the Darkness, the already-short four-week production schedule was cut to just three weeks. While Berman was concerned about the move, Goldsmith hired his son, Joel, to assist. The young composer provided additional music for the film, writing three cues based on his father's motifs and a total of 22 minutes of music. Joel used variations of his father's Borg music and the Klingon theme as Worf fights hand-to-hand (Joel said that he and his father decided to use the theme for Worf separately). When the Borg invade sickbay and the medical hologram distracts them, Joel wrote what critic Jeff Bond termed "almost Coplandesque" material of tuning strings and clarinet, but the cue was unused. While Joel composed many of the film's action cues, his father contributed to the spacewalk and Phoenix flight sequences. During the fight on the deflector dish, Goldsmith used low-register electronics punctuated by stabs of violent, dissonant strings.

In a break with Star Trek film tradition, the soundtrack incorporated two licensed songs: Roy Orbison's "Ooby Dooby" and Steppenwolf's "Magic Carpet Ride". GNP Crescendo president Neil Norman explained that the decision to include the tracks was controversial, but said that "Frakes did the most amazing job of integrating those songs into the story that we had to use them".

GNP released the First Contact soundtrack on December 2, 1996. The album contained 51 minutes of music, with 35 minutes of Jerry Goldsmith's score, 10 minutes of additional music by Joel Goldsmith, "Ooby Dooby" and "Magic Carpet Ride". The compact disc shipped with CD-ROM features only accessible if played on a personal computer, including interviews with Berman, Frakes, and Goldsmith.

==== Star Trek: Insurrection (1998) ====
Insurrection was composer Jerry Goldsmith's fourth film score for the franchise. Goldsmith continued using the march and Klingon themes he crafted for Star Trek: The Motion Picture in 1979, with adding new themes and variations. Insurrection opens with Alexander Courage's Star Trek: The Original Series fanfare, also introducing a six-note motif used in many of the film's action sequences. The Ba'ku are scored with a pastoral theme, repeating harps, string sections, and a woodwind solo. The Ba'ku's ability to slow time uses a variation of this music.

Goldsmith approached starship sequences with quick bursts of brass music. While observers are watching the Ba'ku unseen, Goldsmith employed a "spying theme". Composed of a piano, timpani percussion, and brass, the theme builds until interrupted by the action theme as Data opens fire. Goldsmith did not write a motif for the Son'a, choosing to score the action sequence without designating the Son'a as an antagonist (suggesting the film's revelation that the Son'a and Ba'ku are related.) The film's climax is scored with the active material, balanced by "sense of wonder" music similar to cues from The Motion Picture.

==== Star Trek: Nemesis (2002) ====
The music to Nemesis was the final Star Trek score and penultimate film score composed and conducted by Jerry Goldsmith before his death in 2004 (not including his music for the 2003 film Timeline, which was rejected due to a complicated post-production process). The score opens with Alexander Courage's Star Trek: The Original Series fanfare, but quickly transitions into a much darker theme to accompany the conflict between the Reman and Romulan empires. Goldsmith also composed a new 5-note theme to accompany the character Shinzon and the Scimitar, which is manipulated throughout the score to reflect the multiple dimensions of the character. Goldsmith also incorporated several zipping, swooshing synthesizers into the conventional orchestra to illustrate the suspenseful and horrific elements of the story. The score is book-ended with Goldsmith's theme from Star Trek: The Motion Picture, following a brief excerpt from the popular 1929 song "Blue Skies" by Irving Berlin.

=== Reboot cast ===
==== Star Trek (2009) ====
Michael Giacchino, Abrams' most frequent collaborator, composed the music for Star Trek. He kept the original theme by Alexander Courage for the end credits, which Abrams said symbolized the momentum of the crew coming together. Giacchino admitted personal pressure in scoring the film, as "I grew up listening to all of that great [Trek] music, and that's part of what inspired me to do what I'm doing [...] You just go in scared. You just hope you do your best. It's one of those things where the film will tell me what to do." Scoring took place at the Sony Scoring Stage with a 107-piece orchestra and 40-person choir. An erhu, performed by Karen Han, was used for the Vulcan themes. A distorted recording was used for the Romulans. Varèse Sarabande, the record label responsible for releasing albums of Giacchino's previous scores for Alias, Lost, Mission: Impossible III, and Speed Racer, released the soundtrack for the film on May 5.

==== Star Trek Into Darkness (2013) ====
Before the beginning of principal photography, Michael Giacchino announced that he would compose the score to Star Trek Into Darkness. Just as with the previous installment, Giacchino kept the original theme by Alexander Courage for the end credits, allowing for his newer themes for the various young members of Enterprise to evolve.

==== Star Trek Beyond (2016) ====
As with the previous two films, Michael Giacchino composed the score to Star Trek Beyond.

=== Paramount+ ===
==== Star Trek: Section 31 (2025) ====
In January 2020, Star Trek Discovery composer Jeff Russo expressed interest in also composing the score for Section 31, but said that may not be possible due to his workload and the large number of Star Trek series being produced around the same time. He suggested that he could oversee other composers for Section 31 and other series if Kurtzman asked him to. Russo was confirmed to be composing the film's score in July 2024. The soundtrack album was released on February 14, 2025.

== Television soundtracks overview ==
Number	Series	Original run	Primary composer(s)	Theme	Soundtrack	Timeline
1	The Original Series	September 8, 1966 – June 3, 1969	Alexander Courage	Theme	Soundtrack	The Original Series
2	The Animated Series	September 8, 1973 – October 12, 1974	Ray Ellis; Norm Prescott	N/A	Yvette Blais Jeff Michael	The Original Series
3	The Next Generation	September 28, 1987 – May 23, 1994	Jerry Goldsmith	N/A	N/A	The Next Generation
4	Deep Space Nine	January 3, 1993 – June 2, 1999	Dennis McCarthy	N/A	N/A	The Next Generation
5	Voyager	January 16, 1995 – May 23, 2001	Jerry Goldsmith	N/A	N/A	The Next Generation
6	Enterprise	September 26, 2001 – May 13, 2005	Dennis McCarthy	Theme	Soundtrack	Prequel
7	Discovery	September 24, 2017 – May 30, 2024	Jeff Russo	N/A	N/A	Prequel/Far Future
8	Picard	January 23, 2020 – April 20, 2023	Jeff Russo	N/A	N/A	Post-Voyager
9	Lower Decks	August 6, 2020 – December 19, 2024	Chris Westlake	N/A	N/A	Post-Voyager
10	Prodigy	October 28, 2021 – July 1, 2024	Michael Giacchino (Theme), Nami Melumad (Soundtrack)	N/A	N/A	Post-Voyager
11	Strange New Worlds	May 5, 2022 –	Jeff Russo (Theme), Nami Melumad (Soundtrack)	N/A	N/A	Prequel
12	Starfleet Academy	January 15, 2026 –	Jeff Russo	N/A	N/A	Far Future

== Special instruments ==
Real world

- Blaster Beam

Within the show

- Ressikan flute

== Parodies ==
- "Star Trekkin'"
- "Banned from Argo"

== Concert tours ==
- Star Trek: The Music
- Star Trek: The Ultimate Voyage

== See also ==
- List of Star Trek lists
- List of Star Trek production staff
- William Shatner's musical career
- Leonard Nimoy discography
