= Music of Star Trek II: The Wrath of Khan =

Star Trek II: The Wrath of Khan is a 1982 science fiction film directed by Nicholas Meyer, based on the television series Star Trek and is the second film in the Star Trek film series, following Star Trek: The Motion Picture (1979). The film is scored by James Horner, in his first major film score of his career. He was selected after sorting numerous composers, in place of Jerry Goldsmith, who scored the predecessor and was not considered because of the film's reduced budget. Horner produced a modernistic sound over the John Williams style of epic orchestral film scores for the Star Wars films. According to of Comic Book Resources, his score for Battle Beyond the Stars (1980) served as the inspiration for his Wrath of Khan score.

== Composition and recording ==
When Horner was assigned to work on the film in mid-January 1982, he sketched basic ideas for the score and developed main themes for each character. He then completed writing the entire score within four-and-a-half weeks. The music was recorded at the Warner Bros. Studios, Burbank from April 12–15, 1982, and two additional sessions were conducted on April 30, and May 3, respectively at the Record Plant studio in Los Angeles to modify the themes. Horner composed nearly 72 minutes of score, which was performed by a 91-piece of the Hollywood Studio Symphony. He made use of synthesizers for ancillary effects, and Craig Huxley performed the Blaster beam, as well as composing electronic music for the Genesis Project video. When most of the film's final edit had been locked, before Horner composing the music, he had to change the orchestration process as the integration of special effects caused changes in the scene durations. The score incorporates the Star Trek theme composed by Alexander Courage and written by Gene Roddenberry.

== Release ==
=== Original track list ===
Star Trek II: The Wrath of Khan

Film score by James Horner
- Released: 1982
- Recorded: April 12–15, 1982
- Studios: Warner Bros. Studios, Burbank; Record Plant, Los Angeles
- Genre: Film score
- Length: 44:55
- Label: Atlantic
- Producer: James Horner

James Horner chronology
The Pursuit of D. B. Cooper (1981)	Star Trek II: The Wrath of Khan (1982)	48 Hrs. (1982)

The Wrath of Khan's original score was published in LPs and cassettes through Atlantic Records. In early-1990s, independent label GNP Crescendo Records acquired the licensing and distribution deal of the Star Trek soundtracks from Paramount and issued the album for the first time in CDs.

The album, however, did not include the complete score. Only 9 tracks on a 45-minute duration, in contrast to the initial 72-minute duration, was heard in the album.

Track listing
No.	Title	Length
1.	"Main Title"	3:08
2.	"Surprise Attack"	5:12
3.	"Spock"	1:11
4.	"Kirk's Explosive Reply"	4:03
5.	"Khan's Pets"	4:21
6.	"Enterprise Clears Moorings"	3:35
7.	"Battle In The Mutara Nebula"	8:05
8.	"Genesis Countdown"	6:37
9.	"Epilogue / End Title"	8:43
Total length:		44:55

=== Expanded edition (Retrograde) ===
Star Trek II: The Wrath of Khan (Expanded Edition)

Film score by James Horner
- Released: July 20, 2009
- Genre: Film score
- Length: 75:16
- Label: Retrograde
- Producer: James Horner

On July 20, 2009, Film Score Monthly's Retrograde Records released the expanded edition of the 1982 score album, that featured the complete score as heard in the film. This album consisted of 23 tracks heard in the film with a runtime of 75 minutes. At the International Film Music Critics Association awards held in 2009, the recording was nominated for Best New Archival Release of an Existing Score – Re-Release or Re-Recording. If won, the award would be presented to the composer James Horner and the album producer Lukas Kendall.

Track listing
No.	Title	Length
1.	"Main Title"	3:08
2.	"Surprise on Ceti Alpha V"	0:46
3.	"Khan's Pets"	4:20
4.	"The Eels of Ceti Alpha V / Kirk in Space Shuttle"	3:54
5.	"Enterprise Clears Moorings"	3:34
6.	"Chekov Lies"	0:42
7.	"Spock"	1:13
8.	"Kirk Takes Command / He Tasks Me"	2:08
9.	"Genesis Project"	3:17
10.	"Surprise Attack"	5:08
11.	"Kirk's Explosive Reply"	4:03
12.	"Inside Regula I"	1:37
13.	"Brainwashed"	1:25
14.	"Captain Terrell's Death"	2:00
15.	"Buried Alive"	0:58
16.	"The Genesis Cave"	1:11
17.	"Battle in the Mutara Nebula"	8:09
18.	"Enterprise Attacks Reliant"	1:30
19.	"Genesis Countdown"	6:35
20.	"Spock (Dies)"	1:55
21.	"Amazing Grace"	1:27
22.	"Epilogue / End Title"	8:47
23.	"Epilogue (original version) / End Title"	7:29
Total length:		75:16

=== Remastered edition (La-La Land Records) ===
Star Trek II: The Wrath of Khan (Remastered Edition)

Film score by James Horner
- Released: August 17, 2021
- Genre: Film score
- Length: 132:48
- Label: La-La Land Records
- Producer: James Horner

On August 17, 2021, La-La Land Records published the double album of the remastered score that featured 40 tracks (21 in the first disc, and 19 in the second). The first disc consisted of the complete score, while the second disc includes tracks from the 1982 original release and the remainder of them were accompanied by outtakes, and alternate compositions which were rejected or not included in the final score. The album also included Huxley's composition for the Genesis Project video.

Disc 1
No.	Title	Note	Length
1.	"Main Title"	Contains Theme from Star Trek by Alexander Courage and Gene Roddenberry	3:11
2.	"Surprise On Ceti Alpha V"		0:48
3.	"Khan's Pets"		4:23
4.	"The Eels Of Ceti Alpha V / Kirk In Space Shuttle"	Contains "Theme from Star Trek" by Alexander Courage and Gene Roddenberry	3:57
5.	"Enterprise Clears Moorings"		3:36
6.	"Chekov Lies"	Contains "Theme from Star Trek" by Alexander Courage and Gene Roddenberry	0:43
7.	"Spock"		1:13
8.	"Kirk Takes Command / He Tasks Me"	Contains "Theme from Star Trek" by Alexander Courage and Gene Roddenberry	2:12
9.	"Surprise Attack"		5:10
10.	"Kirk's Explosive Reply"		4:05
11.	"Inside Regula One"		1:51
12.	"Brainwashed"		1:27
13.	"Captain Terrell's Death"		2:01
14.	"Buried Alive"		1:00
15.	"The Genesis Cave"		1:13
16.	"Battle In The Mutara Nebula" (Film Version)		8:11
17.	"Enterprise Attacks Reliant"		1:34
18.	"Genesis Countdown" (Film Version)		6:38
19.	"Spock And Kirk"	Contains "Theme from Star Trek" by Alexander Courage and Gene Roddenberry	1:56
20.	"Amazing Grace"		1:29
21.	"Epilogue / End Title" (Film Version)	Contains "Theme from Star Trek" by Alexander Courage and Gene Roddenberry	8:45
Total length:			65:23

Disc 2
No.	Title	Note	Length
1.	"Main Title"	Contains "Theme from Star Trek" by Alexander Courage and Gene Roddenberry	3:10
2.	"Surprise Attack"		5:10
3.	"Spock"		1:14
4.	"Kirk's Explosive Reply"		4:05
5.	"Khan's Pets"		4:22
6.	"Enterprise Clears Moorings"		3:37
7.	"Battle In The Mutara Nebula"		8:11
8.	"Genesis Countdown"		6:37
9.	"Epilogue / End Title"	Contains "Theme from Star Trek" by Alexander Courage and Gene Roddenberry	8:44
10.	"Genesis Project"	composed and performed by Craig Huxley	3:14
11.	"The Eels Of Ceti Alpha V" (Discrete)		2:41
12.	"Kirk In Space Shuttle" (Discrete)	Contains "Theme from Star Trek" by Alexander Courage and Gene Roddenberry	1:22
13.	"Kirk Takes Command" (Proposed Album Take)	Contains "Theme from Star Trek" by Alexander Courage and Gene Roddenberry	1:43
14.	"Buried Alive" (Alternate Take)		1:02
15.	"Amazing Grace" (Alternate)		1:33
16.	"Epilogue / End Title" (Alternate)	Contains "Theme from Star Trek" by Alexander Courage and Gene Roddenberry	7:33
17.	"Wild Orchestra"		1:37
18.	"Amazing Grace" (Alternate Bagpipes)		1:30
19.	"Theme of Star Trek II" (Edited End Title)	Contains "Theme from Star Trek" by Alexander Courage and Gene Roddenberry	4:51
Total length:			72:33

== Reception ==
In a five-star review, Christian Clemmensen of Filmtracks.com described that the album "remains a fine example of a surprisingly impressive breakout effort for a young composer". John Tenuto of TrekMovie.com described it as "enjoyable music in its own right" and "wonderful". Jason Ankeny of AllMusic wrote "[Horner's] efforts lend Trek creator Gene Roddenberry's vision a newfound gravitas." Thomas Glorieux of Maintitles wrote "Horner defies the sound of science fiction, before, during Star Trek 2, and after it". Charlie Brigden of Den of Geek called it as "a sure-fire five-star score and fits the film beautifully". It has been regarded as one of Horner's best film scores.

== Personnel credits ==
Credits adapted from liner notes:

- James Horner – composer, producer and conductor
- The Hollywood Studio Symphony – orchestra
- Jack Hayes – orchestration
- Bill Freesh – engineer
- Dan Wallin – recording, mixing
- Bob Badami – music editor
- Tom Steel – scoring assistance
- Penn Stevens – digital technician
