= Music of Star Trek IV: The Voyage Home =

Star Trek IV: The Voyage Home is a 1986 science fiction film directed by Leonard Nimoy based on the television series Star Trek: The Original Series and the fourth film in the Star Trek film series. The film is scored by Leonard Rosenman, who is the third Star Trek film composer after Jerry Goldsmith and James Horner. The score received an Academy Award nomination.

== Background ==
James Horner, who previously scored The Wrath of Khan (1982) and The Search for Spock (1984) declined to return for The Voyage Home. As a result, Nimoy turned to his friend Leonard Rosenman to score the film instead. Rosenman wrote an arrangement of Alexander Courage's Star Trek television theme as the title music for the film, but Nimoy requested an original composition. Hence, he wrote a six-note theme with variations set against a repetitive four-note brass motif, that borrowed content from Rosenman's "Riders Of Rohan" for The Lord of the Rings (1978). A cycle of fifths is heard for the second subject. The melody is played in the beginning of the film on Vulcan and the scenes of Taylor's search for Kirk to help find her whales.

Given the Earth-based setting of the filming, Rosenman was provided creative freedom to write a variety of music in different styles. Nimoy wanted the crew's introduction to the streets of San Francisco to be accompanied an instrumental piece which would be reminiscent of George Gershwin, but as Rosenman changed his mind, the scene was scored by a contemporary jazz fusion piece by the band Yellowjackets. When Chekov flees detention aboard the aircraft carrier, Rosenman wrote a bright cue that incorporates classical Russian compositions. The music for the escape from the hospital was done in a baroque style. More familiar Rosenman compositions include the action music for the face off between the Bird-of-Prey and a whaling ship in open water, and the atmospheric music (reminiscent of the composer's work in Fantastic Voyage) during the probe's communication. After the probe leaves, a Vivaldiesque "whale fugue" begins. The first sighting of the Enterprise-A uses the Alexander Courage theme before the end titles.

The punk music during the bus scene was written by Kirk Thatcher who worked with the film's sound designer Mark Mangini and two other sound editors from punk bands to create their own music. They would be credited as the fictional punk band "Edge of Etiquette" and wrote a song named "I Hate You" which contained few explicit lyrics. The song was recorded outside the sound studio in a single take using cheap microphones to create a distorted sound. The song was not included in the original release, but featured along with the Intrada Records expanded edition.

== Release ==
=== Original track list ===
Star Trek IV: The Voyage Home

Film score by Leonard Rosenman
- Released: 1986
- Studios: Record Plant, Los Angeles; American Recording Company, North Hollywood
- Genre: Film score
- Length: 36:16
- Label: MCA
- Producer: Leonard Rosenman

Leonard Rosenman chronology
Sylvia (1985)	Star Trek IV: The Voyage Home (1986)	Promised a Miracle (1988)

The original score album which consisted of 11 tracks with a runtime of 36 minutes was released through MCA Records.

No.	Title	Music	Length
1.	"Main Title"	Leonard Rosenman	2:39
2.	"The Whaler"	Rosenman	2:00
3.	"Market Street"	Yellowjackets	4:39
4.	"Crash-Whale Fugue"	Rosenman	8:15
5.	"Ballad Of The Whale"	Yellowjackets	5:03
6.	"Gillian Seeks Kirk"	Rosenman	2:42
7.	"Chekov's Run"	Rosenman	1:19
8.	"Time Travel"	Rosenman	1:29
9.	"Hospital Chase"	Rosenman	1:13
10.	"The Probe"	Rosenman	1:17
11.	"Home Again/End Credits"	Rosenman	5:40
Total length:			36:16

=== Expanded edition ===
Star Trek IV: The Voyage Home (Expanded Edition)

Film score by Leonard Rosenman
- Released: December 13, 2011
- Genre: Film score
- Length: 71:24
- Label: Intrada
- Producer: Leonard Rosenman

On December 13, 2011, Intrada Records issued an expanded edition that consisted of the complete score with outtakes and alternate cues that were not included in the final album. It also included the original song "I Hate You" composed for the film.

No.	Title	Music	Length
1.	"Logo/Main Title" (contains theme from Star Trek by Alexander Courage)	Rosenman	2:52
2.	"Starfleet Command/On Vulcan/Spock/Ten Seconds of Tension"	Rosenman	1:40
3.	"The Probe"	Rosenman	1:16
4.	"The Probe—Transition/The Take-Off/Menace of the Probe/Clouds and Water/Crew Stunne"	Rosenman	3:08
5.	"Time Travel"	Rosenman	1:28
6.	"Market Street"	Yellowjackets	4:38
7.	"In San Francisco"	Rosenman	2:01
8.	"Chekov's Run"	Rosenman	1:21
9.	"Gillian Seeks Kirk"	Rosenman	2:42
10.	"Hospital Chase"	Rosenman	1:14
11.	"The Whaler"	Rosenman	2:00
12.	"Crash/Whale Fugue"	Rosenman	8:38
13.	"Kirk Freed"	Rosenman	0:44
14.	"Home Again/End Credits"	Rosenman	5:39
15.	"Ballad of the Whale"	Yellowjackets	4:59
16.	"Main Title" (alternate)	Rosenman	2:56
17.	"Time Travel" (alternate)	Rosenman	1:29
18.	"Chekov's Run" (album ending)	Rosenman	1:19
19.	"The Whaler" (alternate)	Rosenman	2:05
20.	"Crash/Whale Fugue" (album track)	Rosenman	8:15
21.	"Home Again/End Credits" (alternate)	Rosenman	5:16
22.	"Main Title" (album track)	Rosenman	2:40
23.	"Whale Fugue" (alternate)	Rosenman	1:05
24.	"I Hate You" (contains explicit lyrics)	Edge Of Etiquette; Mark Mangini (arrangements); Kirk Thatcher (lyrics)	1:59
Total length:			71:24

== Reception ==
James Southall of Movie Wave wrote "This is a fabulous album which affirms the music's right to be considered alongside the classic material which went before (and to a lesser extent after) it in the Star Trek series." Craig Lysy of Movie Music UK called it as "a fun and enjoyable score". Christian Clemmensen of Filmtracks.com was critical of the score, calling it as "too short, too silly, too dated, and too incohesive to be considered a success in retrospect." Steve Vivona of TrekMovie.com called it as "a buoyant, joyful soundtrack that perfectly matched the film's tonal shift from heavy and operatic to light and fun."

== Accolades ==
At the 59th Academy Awards, Rosenman was nominated for Best Original Score for his work in the film. Rosenman became the second composer to receive an Oscar nomination for a Star Trek feature, after Jerry Goldsmith for Star Trek: The Motion Picture (1979).

== Personnel credits ==
Credits adapted from liner notes

- Music composed and produced by – Leonard Rosenman
- Recording – Dan Wallin
- Mixing – Dan Wallin, Mike Matessino
- Mastering – Mike Matessino
- Assistant music editor – David Marshall
- Supervising music editors – Else Blangsted
- ProTools digital transferring – John Davis
- Music – Ralph Ferraro
- Music librarian – Victor Sagerquist
- Production assistance – Frank K. DeWald, Jeff Eldridge, Regina Fake
- Album co-ordinator – Kim Seiniger

Orchestra

- Orchestra conducted by Leonard Rosenman
- Orchestrations – Ralph Ferraro
- Orchestra manager – Carl Fortina
- Copyists – Arthur Richards, Berwyn Linton, Robert Bornstein, Deborah Jones, F.E. Scott Harris, Howard Segurson, Jeffrey Jones, Julia Eidsvoog, Kenneth Mitchell, Phillip Azelton, Roberta McIntosh, Victor Sagerquist

Instruments

- Bass – Annette Atkinson, Bruce Morgenthaler, Buell Neidlinger, Drew Dembowski, Edward Meares, Margaret Storer, Norman Ludwin, Paul Zibits, Robert Stone, Stephens LaFever, Sue Ranney
- Bassoon – Jack Marsh, Kenneth Munday, Michael O'Donovan, Norman Herzberg
- Cello – Anne Karam (Goodman), Armen Ksajikian, Barbara Hedlund, Barbara Hunter, Chris Ermacoff, Dane Little, David Shamban, David Speltz, Dennis Karmazyn, Earl Madison, Harry Shlutz, Larry Corbett, Marie Fera, Robert Adcock, Ronald Leonard, Ronald Cooper, Ronald Royer
- Clarinet – David Shifrin, Dominic Fera, Julian Spear, Theresa Tunnicliff
- Flute – David Shostac, Geraldine Rotella, James Walker, Sheridon Stokes, Susan Greenberg
- French horn – David A. Duke, Henry Sigismonti, Richard Perissi, Vince DeRosa
- Harp – Catherine Gotthoffer, Dorothy Remsen
- Keyboards – John Beasley, Ralph Grierson
- Oboe – David Weiss, Joan Elardo, John Winter, Thomas Boyd
- Percussion – Alan Vavrin, Robert Zimmitti, Emil Richards, Joe Porcaro, Kenneth Watson, Larry Bunker
- Piano – Chet Swiatkowski
- Trombone – Richard Nash, Donald Waldrop, Lloyd Ulyate, Phillip Teele
- Trumpet – Boyde Hood, Malcolm McNab, Mario Guarneri, Robert Divall
- Tuba – John T. Johnson
- Viola – Alan DeVeritch, Archie Levin, Carole Mukogawa, David Schwartz, David Stenske, Denyse Buffum, Donald McInnes, Herschel Wise, James Dunham, Janet Lakatos, Linn Subotnick, Michael Nowak, Mihail Zinovyev, Milton Thomas, Myra Kestenbaum, Pamela Goldsmith, Roland Kato, Rollice Dale, Steven Gordon
- Violin – Arnold Belnick, Assa Drori, Barry Socher, Bernard Kundell, Bill Hybel, Bonnie Douglas, Brian Dembow, Bruce Dukov, Carol Shive, Connie Kupka, Daniel Shindaryov, Darius Campo, David Frisina, Diane Halprin, Dorothy Martirando, Dorothy Wade, Haim Shtrum, Harold Wolf, Harris Goldman, Harry Cykman, Henry Ferber, Herman Clebanoff, Israel Baker, Jacqueline Brand, James Getzoff, John Wittenberg, John Zemjanis, Julie Gigante, Kathleen Lenski, Marshall Sosson, Michael Ferril, Michele Bovyer, Miwako Watanabe, Murray Adler, Norman Carr, Oscar Chausow, Paul Shure, Peter Kent, Ralph Morrison, Robert Dubow, Robert Peterson, Ronald Clark, Russ Cantor, Ruth Johnson, Sheldon Sanov, Stanley Plummer, Stuart Canin, Thomas Buffum, Yoko Matsuda

Personnel credits in the song "Market Street" and "Ballad Of The Whale"

- Co-producer – David Hetschel, The Yellowjackets
- Arrangements – The Yellowjackets
- Composers – Jimmy Haslip, Leonard Rosenman, Russell Ferrante
- Bass – Jimmy Haslip
- Drum machine – Jimmy Haslip, David Garibaldi, Russell Ferrante
- Keyboards – Russell Ferrante
- Saxophone – Marc Russo

Personnel credits in the song "I Hate You" (Only included in Intrada Records expanded edition)

- Bass guitar – Louie Metz
- Drums – Aaron Glascock
- Guitar – Mark Mangini
- Vocals – Kirk Thatcher
