= Music of Star Trek: The Motion Picture =

Soundtrack to the 1979 American science fiction film Star Trek: The Motion Picture

The music to the 1979 American science fiction film Star Trek: The Motion Picture featured musical score composed and conducted by Jerry Goldsmith and performed by the Hollywood Studio Symphony,beginning his long association with the Star Trek film and television franchise. Influenced by the romantic, sweeping music of Star Wars by John Williams, Goldsmith created a similar score, with extreme cutting-edge technologies being used for recording and creating the sound effects. The score received critical acclaim and has been considered one of Goldsmith's best scores in his career.

== Composition and recording ==
Some of the instrumental pieces, used to record the score, includes the ADS (Advanced Digital Synthesizer) 11, manufactured from Con Brio, Inc., the Blaster Beam, an electronic instrument 12 to 15 feet (3.7 to 4.6 m) long, created by musician Craig Huxley, and several state-of-the-art synthesizers used as musical instruments, notably the Yamaha CS-80, ARP 2600, Oberheim OB-X, and Serge synthesizer. The film is notably the only film in the Star Trek series to have an overture, using "Ilia's Theme", which was later re-recorded, as a lyrical version, by Shaun Cassidy as "A Star Beyond Time" with lyrics by Larry Kusik. Goldsmith scored The Motion Picture over three to four months, and was assisted by Alexander Courage, composer of the original Star Trek theme, providing arrangements to accompany Kirk's log entries, and Fred Steiner, who wrote 11 cues of additional music. The recording was completed on December 1, six days before the film's release.

== Release history ==
Columbia Records released the score in 1979, in conjunction with the film's release and became one of Goldsmith's best-selling scores. This would be followed by an expanded edition released by Legacy Recordings on November 10, 1998, with additional 21 minutes of music supplemented the original track list, and released into a double disc album, with the first containing the score and the second disc featured an audio documentary "Inside Star Trek". In 2012, the score was re-issued by La-La Land Records into a 3-CD set containing the complete score, as well as unreleased cues, alternatives and additional music supplementing the album. It was again remastered in 2022, which would be followed by the director's edition soundtrack released by Paramount Music the same year.

=== Original 1979 release ===
Star Trek: The Motion Picture

Film score by Jerry Goldsmith
- Released: 1979
- Recorded: September–December 1979
- Genre: Film score
- Length: TBA
- Label: Columbia
- Producer: Jerry Goldsmith

Jerry Goldsmith chronology
Alien (1979)	''Star Trek: The Motion Picture'' (1979)	Players (1979)

No.	Title	Length
1.	"Main Title / Klingon Battle"
2.	"Leaving Drydock"
3.	"The Cloud"
4.	"The Enterprise"
5.	"Ilia's Theme"
6.	"V'ger Flyover"
7.	"The Meld"
8.	"Spock Walk"
9.	"End Credits"

=== 20th Anniversary Edition ===
Star Trek: The Motion Picture (20th Anniversary Edition)

Film score by Jerry Goldsmith
- Released: November 10, 1998
- Genre: Film score
- Length: 129:14
- Label: Legacy Recordings
- Producer: Jerry Goldsmith

Disc 1

1. Ilia's Theme(Overture) – 3:01
2. Main Title – 1:23
3. Klingon Battle – 5:27
4. Total Logic – 3:44
5. Floating Office – 1:03
6. The Enterprise – 5:59
7. Leaving Drydock – 3:29
8. Spock's Arrival – 1:58
9. The Cloud – 4:58
10. V'ger Flyover – 4:57
11. The Force Field – 5:03
12. Games – 3:41
13. Spock Walk – 4:19
14. Inner Workings – 3:01
15. V'ger Speaks – 3:50
16. The Meld – 3:09
17. A Good Start – 2:26
18. End Credits – 3:16

Total length: 64:44

Disc 2

1. Star Trek Theme – 1:34
2. Introduction: Nichelle Nichols – 1:13
3. Inside Star Trek – 1:04
4. William Shatner Meets Captain Kirk – 9:12
5. Introduction To Live Show – 0:25
6. About Science Fiction – 0:40
7. The Origin Of Spock – 1:45
8. Sarek's Son Spock – 7:21
9. The Questor Affair – 3:49
10. The Genesis II Pilot – 2:34
11. Cyborg Tools And E.T. Life Forms – 4:06
12. McCoy's Rx For Life – 6:14
13. The Star Trek Philosophy – 4:40
14. Asimov's World Of Science Fiction – 6:27
15. The Enterprise Runs Around – 1:50
16. A Letter From A Network Censor – 5:03
17. The Star Trek Dream (Ballad I / Ballad II) – 5:43
18. Sign off: Nichelle Nichols – 0:50

Total length: 64:30

=== Limited edition ===
Star Trek: The Motion Picture (Limited Edition)

Film score by Jerry Goldsmith
- Released: June 5, 2012
- Genre: Film score
- Length: 221:03
- Label: La-La Land Records
- Producer: Jerry Goldsmith

Disc 1 – The Film Score

1. The Film Score: Overture – 1:43
2. Main Title/Klingon Battle – 7:01
3. Total Logic – 3:54
4. Floating Office – 1:08
5. The Enterprise – 6:02
6. Malfunction – 1:30
7. Goodbye Klingon/Goodbye Epsilon Nine/Pre-Launch – 2:10
8. Leaving Drydock – 3:32
9. TV Theme/Warp Point Eight – 0:50
10. No Goodbyes – 0:53
11. Spock's Arrival – 2:03
12. TV Theme/Warp Point Nine – 1:49
13. Meet V'Ger – 3:06
14. The Cloud – 5:05
15. V'Ger Flyover – 5:01
16. The Force Field – 5:07
17. Micro Exam – 1:13
18. Games/Spock Walk – 9:51
19. System Inoperative – 2:03
20. Hidden Information – 3:58
21. Inner Workings – 4:04

Total length: 72:03

Disc 2 – The Film Score/The Unused Score/Scores from the 1979 Album

1. The Film Score: V'ger Speaks – 4:04
2. The Meld/A Good Start – 5:37
3. End Title – 3:16
4. The Unused Early Score: The Enterprise (early version) – 6:05
5. Leaving Drydock (early version) – 2:39
6. No Goodbyes (early version) – 0:55
7. Spock's Arrival (early version) – 2:00
8. Micro Exam (early version) – 1:15
9. Games (early version) – 3:49
10. Inner Workings (early version) – 4:43
11. The 1979 Album: Main Title/Klingon Battle – 6:50
12. Leaving Drydock – 3:29
13. The Cloud – 5:00
14. The Enterprise – 5:59
15. Ilia's Theme – 3:00
16. V'ger Flyover – 4:56
17. The Meld – 3:15
18. Spock Walk – 4:17
19. End Title – 3:16

Total length: 74:25

Disc 3 – Alternates/Additional Music

1. Alternates: Overture (long version) – 2:50
2. Main Title (alternate take) – 1:44
3. Total Logic (alternate take) – 3:49
4. Malfunction (early take) – 1:28
5. Goodbye Klingon (alternate take) – 0:35
6. No Goodbyes (alternate take) – 0:53
7. Spock's Arrival (alternate take) – 2:01
8. The Force Field (alternate take) – 5:04
9. Micro Exam (alternate take) – 1:14
10. Games (early synthesizer version) – 3:48
11. Games (alternate take) – 3:48
12. Inner Workings (alternate take) – 4:05
13. V'ger Speaks (alternate take) – 4:03
14. The Meld (film version) – 3:16
15. A Good Start (discrete) – 2:27
16. Main Title (album take) – 1:44
17. Additional Music: Main Title (first raw takes) – 7:21
18. The Force Field/The Cloud (excerpts) – 2:33
19. Beams and Synthesizer for V'Ger – 4:04
20. Beams and Synthesizer for Ilia – 0:59
21. Synthesizer for Main Theme – 1:44
22. Main Theme From Star Trek: The Motion Picture (disco version – Bob James) – 5:24
23. A Star Beyond Time (vocal version of Ilia's Theme – Shaun Cassidy) – 2:43
24. Ilia's Theme (alternate) – 3:33
25. Theme From Star Trek: The Motion Picture (concert edit) – 3:25

Total length: 74:35

=== Vinyl edition ===
Star Trek: The Motion Picture (Limited Edition – Vinyl)

Film score by Jerry Goldsmith
- Released: March 8, 2017
- Genre: Film score
- Length: 83:33
- Label: La-La Land Records
- Producer: Jerry Goldsmith

Side A

1. Overture – 1:41
2. Main Title/Klingon Battle – 6:59
3. Total Logic – 3:54
4. Floating Office – 1:07
5. The Enterprise – 6:00
6. Malfunction – 1:29
7. Goodbye Klingons/Goodbye Epsilon Nine/Pre-Launch – 2:08

Side B

1. Leaving Drydock – 3:31
2. TV Theme/Warp Point Eight – 0:48
3. No Goodbyes – 0:53
4. Spock's Arrival – 2:03
5. TV Theme/Warp Point Nine – 1:46
6. Meet V'Ger – 3:02
7. The Cloud – 5:02
8. V'Ger Flyover – 4:59

Side C

1. The Force Field – 4:15
2. Micro Exam – 1:13
3. Games/Spock Walk – 9:50
4. System Inoperative – 2:02
5. Hidden Information – 3:56

Side D

1. Inner Workings – 4:04
2. V'Ger Speaks – 4:03
3. The Meld – 5:35
4. End Title – 3:13

=== Director's edition ===
Star Trek: The Motion Picture (Director's Edition)

Film score by Jerry Goldsmith
- Released: April 5, 2022
- Genre: Film score
- Length: 86:31
- Label: Paramount Music
- Producer: Jerry Goldsmith

No.	Title	Length
1.	"Overture"	2:50
2.	"Main Title and Klingon Battle"	7:01
3.	"Total Logic"	3:53
4.	"Floating Office"	1:08
5.	"The Enterprise"	6:03
6.	"Malfunction"	1:30
7.	"The Crew Briefing"	2:11
8.	"Leaving Drydock (Film Version)"	3:34
9.	"Captain's Log – Warp One"	0:50
10.	"No Goodbyes"	0:55
11.	"Spock's Arrival"	2:04
12.	"Captain's Log – Warp Seven"	1:49
13.	"Meet V'ger"	3:05
14.	"The Cloud (Film Version)"	5:05
15.	"V'ger Flyover (Film Version)"	5:01
16.	"The Force Field"	5:06
17.	"Micro Exam"	1:16
18.	"Games"	5:35
19.	"Spock Walk (Film Version)"	4:25
20.	"System Inoperative"	2:03
21.	"Hidden Information"	3:59
22.	"Inner Workings"	4:06
23.	"V'ger Speaks"	4:05
24.	"The Meld and a Good Start"	5:37
25.	"End Credits"	3:20
Total length:		86:31

== Reception ==
A review from Filmtracks.com summarised "Star Trek: The Motion Picture is one of the few scores that truly deserves the title of "classic masterpiece." It was a huge factor in salvaging a troubled production and defined the music for a franchise to come. The depth of its secondary themes has never been repeated, and no following sequel score has been so richly endowed with such a perfect blend of romance, suspense, and gravity." Bruce Eder of AllMusic wrote "Jerry Goldsmith's music, alternately eerie and savage, was the best part of the movie". Music critic Jonathan Broxton called the score "Goldsmith’s Magnum Opus as well as the best score of the Star Trek franchise" and continued "He provides a multiplicity of timeless themes and motifs, all brilliantly conceived and perfectly attenuated to the film’s stunning imagery. I believe the score transcends the film and ensures Goldsmith’s place in the pantheon of great composers. I highly recommend this score for your collection as an essential component of Goldsmith’s canon and great musical works."

== Accolades ==
In addition to the following nominations, it was also one of the American Film Institute's 250 nominated scores for their top 25 American film scores.

Award	Category	Nominee(s)	Result	Ref.
Academy Awards	Best Original Score	Jerry Goldsmith	Nominated	
Golden Globe Awards	Best Original Score	Jerry Goldsmith	Nominated	
Saturn Awards	Best Music	Jerry Goldsmith	Nominated	

== See also ==
- List of Star Trek composers and music
