= Star Trek: First Contact (soundtrack) =

1996 film score by Jerry Goldsmith

Film score by Jerry Goldsmith
- Released: December 2, 1996
- Recorded: October 14–18, 1996
- Studios: Paramount Scoring Stage, Paramount Pictures Studios, Hollywood, Los Angeles
- Genre: Film score
- Length: 50:45
- Label: GNP Crescendo
- Producer: Jerry Goldsmith

Jerry Goldsmith chronology
Chain Reaction (1996)	Star Trek: First Contact (1996)	The Ghost and the Darkness (1996)

The music to the 1996 science fiction film Star Trek: First Contact is composed and conducted by Jerry Goldsmith, in his third Star Trek film after The Motion Picture (1979) and The Final Frontier (1989), and performed by the Hollywood Studio Symphony. The film, directed by Jonathan Frakes, is based on the television series The Next Generation and the eighth Star Trek film overall. Goldsmith composed and recorded most of the cues in a short span of time with assistance from his son Joel Goldsmith, who in-turn had written a few cues and additional music based on his father's motifs. The score was released by GNP Crescendo Records on December 2, 1996.

== Production and composition ==
Goldsmith wrote a main title that begins with Alexander Courage's Star Trek fanfare, a norm with Star Trek films. He composed a pastoral theme linked to humanity's hopeful first contact, consisting of a four-note motif, that he used in The Final Frontier score. This motif is previously used in First Contact as a friendship theme and general thematic link. To represent Borg, he wrote a menacing march with the addition of synthesizers. Besides composing new music, Goldsmith used his main theme and the Klingon theme from The Motion Picture, the latter was used to represent Worf.

Because of delays with Paramount's The Ghost and the Darkness, the already-short four-week production schedule was cut to just three weeks. While producer Rick Berman was concerned above the move, Goldsmith recruited his son Joel to assist him and complete the score in a short span of time. Joel provided additional music for the film, writing three cues based on his father's motifs and a total of 22 minutes of music he composed for the film. He used variations of Borg's and Klingon's theme as Worf fights hand-to-hand. When the Borg invade sickbay and the medical hologram distracts them, Joel wrote a cue that tuned strings and clarinet, resembling Aaron Copland's musical style, but the cue was unused. While Joel composed many of the film's action cues, his father contributed to the spacewalk and Phoenix flight sequences. During the fight on the deflector dish, Goldsmith used low-register electronics punctuated by stabs of violent, dissonant strings.

The score was recorded at the Paramount Scoring Stage at Paramount Pictures Studios in Hollywood, Los Angeles from October 14–18, 1996.

== Release ==
The First Contact soundtrack was released by the independent label GNP Crescendo Records—which distributed all of the Star Trek film and television soundtracks—on December 2, 1996, The album contained 51 minutes of music, with 35 minutes of Jerry Goldsmith's score, 10 minutes of additional music by Joel Goldsmith, and two licensed songs—Roy Orbison's "Ooby Dooby" and Steppenwolf's "Magic Carpet Ride". The incorporation of licensed music in film, was against the norm in Star Trek film traditions; according to GNP's president Neil Norman explained that the decision to include the tracks was controversial but said that "Frakes did the most amazing job of integrating those songs into the story that we had to use them". The compact disc shipped with CD-ROM features only accessible if played on a personal computer, including interviews with Berman, Frakes, and Goldsmith.

== Track listing ==
No.	Title	Artist(s)	Length
1.	"Main Title / Locutus" (additional music by Joel Goldsmith)		4:17
2.	"Red Alert"		2:13
3.	"Temporal Wake"		2:07
4.	"Welcome Aboard"		2:40
5.	"Fully Functional"		3:18
6.	"Retreat"		3:59
7.	"Evacuate"		2:19
8.	"39.1 Degrees Celsius"		4:44
9.	"The Dish"		7:05
10.	"First Contact"		5:52
11.	"End Credits"		5:24
12.	"Magic Carpet Ride"	Steppenwolf	4:25
13.	"Ooby Dooby"	Roy Orbison	2:22
Total length:			50:45

== Complete score ==
Star Trek: First Contact (Complete Score)

Film score by Jerry Goldsmith and Joel Goldsmith
- Released: April 2, 2012
- Genre: Film score
- Length: 77:29
- Label: GNP Crescendo
- Producer: Jerry Goldsmith

On April 2, 2012, GNP Crescendo Records announced a limited-edition collector's CD pressed to 10,000 copies. It features the complete score by Jerry Goldsmith with additional music by his son Joel, newly remastered by recording engineer Bruce Botnick, with an accompanying 16-page booklet including informative notes by Jeff Bond and John Takis. The expanded album [GNPD 8079] runs 79 minutes and includes three tracks of alternates. It does not include the two songs as heard in the film.

=== Track listing ===
No.	Title	Music	Length
1.	"Main Title/Locutus"	Jerry Goldsmith; Joel Goldsmith (additional music)	4:16
2.	"How Many Ships"	Jerry Goldsmith	0:28
3.	"Battle Watch"	Joel Goldsmith	1:10
4.	"Red Alert"	Jerry Goldsmith	2:13
5.	"Temporal Wake"	Jerry Goldsmith	2:07
6.	"Shields Down"	Jerry Goldsmith	1:45
7.	"The Phoenix"	Joel Goldsmith	1:00
8.	"They're Here"	Joel Goldsmith	0:25
9.	"39.1 Degrees Celsius"	Joel Goldsmith	4:45
10.	"Search for the Borg"	Joel Goldsmith	1:50
11.	"Retreat"	Joel Goldsmith	3:59
12.	"No Success"	Jerry Goldsmith	1:31
13.	"Borg Montage"	Joel Goldsmith	1:02
14.	"Welcome Aboard"	Jerry Goldsmith	2:40
15.	"Stimulation"	Jerry Goldsmith	1:04
16.	"Smorgasborg"	Joel Goldsmith	1:28
17.	"Getting Ready"	Jerry Goldsmith	1:33
18.	"Fully Functional"	Jerry Goldsmith	3:19
19.	"The Dish"	Jerry Goldsmith	7:06
20.	"Objection Noted"	Jerry Goldsmith	1:54
21.	"Not Again"	Jerry Goldsmith	2:41
22.	"Evacuate"	Jerry Goldsmith	2:20
23.	"New Orders/All the Time"	Jerry Goldsmith	3:49
24.	"Flight of the Phoenix"	Joel Goldsmith	6:20
25.	"First Contact"	Jerry Goldsmith	6:00
26.	"End Credits"	Jerry Goldsmith	5:26
27.	"The Phoenix" (alternate)	Joel Goldsmith	1:07
28.	"Borg Montage" (alternate)	Jerry Goldsmith	1:17
29.	"Main Title" (alternate)	Jerry Goldsmith	2:54
Total length:			77:29

== Reception ==
Christian Clemmensen of Filmtracks.com wrote "Star Trek: First Contact is a consistent score with outstanding cohesion, but a handful of questionable thematic attributes outside of the Borg material restrict its ambitions." Craig Lysy of Movie Music UK called it as "one of Jerry Goldsmith’s finest Star Trek scores and offers enduring testimony to his genius as a film score composer as well as his innate understanding of the Star Trek universe."

John Tenuto of TrekMovie.com wrote "Listening to tracks for the first time without the effects and dialog give listeners a better appreciation for Goldsmith's genius." Gregory Heaney of AllMusic wrote "While die-hard fans of the series more than likely already own the first release of the score, the complete edition is a must-hear for fans of Goldsmith's work for the sci-fi series." Reviewing for Den of Geek, Alex Carter summarized that "The main theme is a wonderful, yearning pastoral number that underlines the historical significance of the titular first contact, but the instrumentation makes it almost militaristic at the same time."

== Personnel credits ==
Credits adapted from CD liner notes

Album credits

- Music composed, produced and conducted by – Jerry Goldsmith
- Orchestra – The Hollywood Studio Symphony
- Orchestrations – Alexander Courage, Arthur Morton, Evan Vidar, Jeff Atmajian, Rich Chadock
- Contractor – Sandy DeCrescent
- Computer programming – Nick Vidar
- Recording assistance – Dominic Gonzales, Norman Dlugatch, Paul Wertheimer
- Recording, mixing and mastering – Bruce Botnick
- Music editor – Clifford Kolhweck, Ken Hall
- Audio preparation – Mike Matessino, Neil S. Bulk
- Music coordinator – Kim Seiniger
- Copyist – Bob Bornstein
- Music librarian – Victor Sagerquist
- Musical assistance – Lois Carruth
- Executive producer – Neil Norman, Mark Banning

Performer credits

- Bass – Arni Egilsson, Christophe Hanulik, Constance Deeter, David Young, Donald Ferrone, Frances Wu, Ian Walker, Nico Abondolo, Oscar Meza, Paul Zibits, Richard Libertini, Steve Edelman, Timothy Barr, Timothy Eckert
- Bassoon – John Steinmetz, Kenneth Munday, Michael O'Donovan
- Cello – Andrew Cook, Antony Cooke, Christine Ermacoff, Dane Little, David Low, David Speltz, Dennis Karmazyn, Douglas Davis, John Walz, Judith Johnson, Marie Fera, Martin Tillmann, Matthew Cooker, Maurice Grants, Paul Cohen, Roger Lebow, Sebastian Toettcher, Steve Richards, Timothy Landauer
- Clarinet – Debra Kanter, Dominick Fera, Emily Bernstein, Gary Bovyer, James Kanter
- Flute – David Shostac, James Walker, Sheridon Stokes, Susan Greenberg
- French horn – Bradley Kintscher, Brad Warnaar, Brian O'Connor, Carol Drake, Daniel Kelley, Kurt Snyder, Phillip Yao, Richard Todd, Ronn Kaufmann, Steven Becknell, Todd Miller
- Guitar – Evan Vidar, Rick Chadock
- Harp – Jo Ann Turovsky, Marcia Dickstein
- Keyboards – Michael Lang, Ralph Grierson, Richard Ruttenberg
- Oboe – John Ellis, Phillip Ayling
- Percussion – Emil Richards, Gary Coleman, Larry Bunker, Steve Forman, Steven Schaeffer
- Trombone – Richard Nash, Lloyd Ulyate, Phillip Teele
- Trumpet – Boyde Hood, Calvin Price, David Washburn, George Dillon, Warren Luening
- Tuba – Fred Greene, James Self
- Viola – Andrew Picken, Carol Kleister-Castillo, Carrie Holzman-Little, Dan Neufeld, Daniel Seidenberg, Janet Lakatos, Jennie Hansen, Karen Elaine, Linn Subotnick, Marlow Fisher, Michael Nowak, Michael Ramos, Rick Gerding, Robert Becker, Robin Ross, Ron Strauss, Scott Haupert, Simon Oswell, Steven Gordon, Suzanna Giordano, Victoria Miskolczy
- Violin – Alexander Treger, Amy Hershberger, Anatoly Rosinsky, Bonnie Douglas, Charles Everett, Clayton Haslop, Connie Kupka, David Stenske, Dennis Molchan, Dorothy Wade, Eun-Mee Ahn, Eve Sprecher, Ezra Kliger, Galina Golovin, Garry Kuo, Greg Moore, Isabella Lippi, Jay Rosen, Joel Derouin, Julie Gigante, Kathleen Lenski, Kenneth Yerke, Laurence Greenfield, Leslie Katz, Liane Reynolds, Lily Chen, Marc Sazer, Margaret Sims, Margaret Wooten, Mario DeLeon, Michael Ferrill, Miran Kojian, Miwako Watanabe, Natalie Leggett, Nicole Bush, North Wood, Olivia Tsui, Pamela Gates, Patricia Aiken, Paul Shure, Peter Kent, Polly Sweeney, Rafael Rishik, Ralph Morrison III, Richard Leshin, Robert Brosseau, Robin Lorentz, Roger Haines, Roger Wilkie, Ron Clark, Ronald Folsom, Russ Cantor, Sid Page, Susan Rishik, Cara Chang

== Bibliography ==
- Bond, Jeff (1999). The Music of Star Trek: Profiles in Style. Lone Eagle Publishing Company. ISBN 1580650120 – via Internet Archive.
