= Music of Star Trek III: The Search for Spock =

Star Trek III: The Search for Spock is the 1984 science fiction film directed by Leonard Nimoy based on the television series Star Trek: The Original Series and the third film in the Star Trek franchise. The film score is composed by James Horner, that served as a continuation from the score of Star Trek II: The Wrath of Khan (1982) with few themes being reworked for this film.

== Background ==
James Horner returned to score The Search for Spock, fulfilling a promise he had made to the film's producer Harve Bennett on The Wrath of Khan. Initially, Nimoy considered hiring his friend Leonard Rosenman to score the film, but he was persuaded that Horner's return would grant continuity between the two films. Much like the film, Horner's music was a direct continuation of the score he wrote for the predecessor. When writing music for The Wrath of Khan, Horner was aware he would reuse certain cues for an impending sequel; two major themes he reworked were for Genesis and Spock. While the Genesis theme supplants the title music Horner wrote for The Wrath of Khan, the end credits were quoted "almost verbatim".

In hours-long discussions with Bennett and Nimoy, Horner agreed with the director that the "romantic and more sensitive" cues were more important than the "bombastic" ones. Horner had written Spock's theme to give the character more dimension: "By putting a theme over Spock, it warms him and he becomes three-dimensional rather than a collection of schticks," he said. The theme was expanded in The Search for Spock to represent the ancient alien mysticism and culture of Spock and Vulcan.

Among the new cues Horner wrote was a "percussive and atonal" theme for the Klingons which is represented heavily in the film. Music author Jeff Bond described the cue as a compromise between music from Horner's earlier film Wolfen, Khan's motif from The Wrath of Khan, and Jerry Goldsmith's Klingon music from The Motion Picture. Horner also adapted music from Sergei Prokofiev's Romeo and Juliet for part of the Enterprise theft sequence and its destruction, while the scoring to Spock's resurrection on Vulcan was lifted from Horner's Brainstorm ending.

The score was recorded for three days at the Record Plant studio in Los Angeles. Like the predecessors, Horner incorporated the Star Trek theme in most of the cues including the main title and the final cues.

== Release ==
=== Original track list ===
Star Trek III: The Search for Spock

Film score by James Horner
- Released: 1984
- Studios: Record Plant, Los Angeles
- Genre: Film score
- Length: 46:15
- Label: Capitol
- Producer: James Horner

James Horner chronology
The Stone Boy (1984)	Star Trek III: The Search for Spock (1984)	Heaven Help Us (1985)

The Search for Spock's original score was released in LPs and cassettes through Capitol Records in the United States and EMI Records in the United Kingdom. In early-1990s, the independent label GNP Crescendo Records acquired the licensing and distribution deal with Paramount to distribute Star Trek soundtracks in CDs which included The Search of Spock's soundtrack which released on January 21, 1992. The soundtrack did not feature the complete score. Only nine tracks were included in the album which runs for 46 minutes.

No.	Title	Length
1.	"Prologue and Main Title"	6:27
2.	"Klingons"	5:55
3.	"Stealing the Enterprise"	8:33
4.	"The Mind Meld"	2:30
5.	"Bird of Prey Decloaks"	3:37
6.	"Returning to Vulcan"	4:49
7.	"The Katra Ritual"	4:29
8.	"End Titles"	6:12
9.	"The Search for Spock"	3:43
Total length:		46:15

=== Expanded edition (Retrograde) ===
Star Trek III: The Search for Spock (Expanded Edition)

Film score by James Horner
- Released: June 1, 2010
- Genre: Film score
- Length: 116:26
- Label: Retrograde
- Producer: James Horner

On June 1, 2010, Film Score Monthly's Retrograde Records issued an expanded edition of the score in double album. The first disc featured the complete score including outtakes and cues that were not in the original album, while the second disc consisted of the tracks featured in the 1984 original release.

Disc 1
No.	Title	Length
1.	"Prologue and Main Title"	6:31
2.	"Klingons"	5:59
3.	"Spock's Cabin"	1:40
4.	"The Klingon's Plan"	1:03
5.	"The Mind-Meld"	2:32
6.	"Stealing the Enterprise"	8:41
7.	"Grissom Destroyed"	1:03
8.	"Sunset on Genesis"	2:18
9.	"Spock Endures Pon Farr"	3:04
10.	"Bird of Prey Decloacks"	3:48
11.	"A Fighting Chance to Live"	3:54
12.	"Genesis Destroyed"	2:43
13.	"Returning to Vulcan"	4:58
14.	"The Katra Ritual"	4:31
15.	"End Titles"	6:19
16.	"That Old Black Magic/Tangerine/I Remember You"	10:32
Total length:		69:36

Disc 2
No.	Title	Length
1.	"Prologue And Main Title"	6:30
2.	"Klingons"	5:58
3.	"Stealing The Enterprise"	08:35
4.	"The Mind Meld"	02:32
5.	"Bird Of Prey Decloaks"	03:48
6.	"Returning To Vulcan"	04:55
7.	"The Katra Ritual"	04:31
8.	"End Title"	06:19
9.	"The Search For Spock"	03:42
Total length:		46:50

=== Reissue (Intrada) ===
Star Trek III: The Search for Spock (Expanded Edition) [Reissue]

Film score by James Horner
- Released: June 14, 2022
- Genre: Film score
- Length: 115:47
- Label: Intrada
- Producer: James Horner

The album was reissued by Intrada Records on June 14, 2022, which consisted of the contents similar to the 2010 expanded edition, but with varied track lengths.

Disc 1
No.	Title	Length
1.	"Prologue and Main Title"	6:30
2.	"Klingons"	5:57
3.	"Spock's Cabin"	1:40
4.	"The Klingon's Plan"	1:01
5.	"The Mind-Meld"	2:31
6.	"Stealing the Enterprise"	8:39
7.	"Grissom Destroyed"	1:02
8.	"Sunset on Genesis"	2:17
9.	"Spock Endures Pon Farr"	3:04
10.	"Bird of Prey Decloaks"	3:47
11.	"A Fighting Chance to Live"	3:52
12.	"Genesis Destroyed"	2:42
13.	"Returning to Vulcan"	4:56
14.	"The Katra Ritual"	4:30
15.	"End Titles"	6:13
16.	"That Old Black Magic/Tangerine/I Remember You (Bar Source)"	10:32
Total length:		69:13

Disc 2
No.	Title	Length
1.	"Prologue and Main Title"	6:29
2.	"Klingons"	5:56
3.	"Stealing the Enterprise"	8:34
4.	"The Mind-Meld"	2:31
5.	"Bird of Prey Decloaks"	3:46
6.	"Returning to Vulcan"	4:53
7.	"The Katra Ritual"	4:30
8.	"End Titles"	6:13
9.	"The Search for Spock (Theme From Star Trek III)"	3:42
Total length:		46:34

== Reception ==
According to music critic Christian Clemmensen of Filmtracks, the score for Search for Spock "is still not as strong as its predecessor by any means of comparison". Craig Lysy of Movie Music UK called it as "an inspired score, which in scene after scene is perfectly attenuated to the film's narrative". Dexter Palmer of Reactor called it as "James Horner’s score for Star Trek III reuses many of the themes he used in Star Trek II, but gentle, subtle tweaks to the orchestration invest them with a sense of sadness that fits the movie’s more subdued subject matter. The result is a score that has a wider, more comprehensive range of emotion, from the slightly toned-down reworking of Star Trek II’s main title music, to the Goldsmith-like, percussion-driven music associated with the Klingons, to the melancholic melodies that accompany Kirk and crew’s return to Vulcan."

John Tenuto of TrekMovie.com wrote "Listening to the music isolated from special effects and dialog of the film plays the film itself, and all its emotion, in the imagination." Jason Ankeny of AllMusic wrote "themes like "Klingons" and "Bird of Prey Decloaks" rank alongside Horner's most suspenseful and intense moments." Joshua M. Patton of Comic Book Resources wrote "James Horner's score elevates each moment of the film with themes and motifs that immediately feel like classic Star Trek music fans have lived with all their lives." Dusty Stowe of Screen Rant wrote "Horner's score for The Search For Spock is a considerable expansion of the themes he established in the previous film, with swirling strings and bombastic horns providing the soundtrack to Kirk's desperate attempt to save Spock. Late in the film, as a devastated Kirk watches the remains of the USS Enterprise burn up, Horner's score perfectly evokes the complex emotions Kirk is experiencing."

== Personnel credits ==
Credits adapted from liner notes

- James Horner – composer, conductor, producer
- Greig McRitchie – orchestrator
- Dan Wallin – recording, mixing
- Bill Benton – recording
- Stephen Marcussen – mastering
- David Collins – digital mastering
- Bob Badami – music editor
