= Star Trek Generations (soundtrack) =

1994 film score by Dennis McCarthy

Film score by Dennis McCarthy
- Released: November 8, 1994
- Recorded: 1994
- Studios: Paramount Scoring Stage, Paramount Pictures Studios, Hollywood, Los Angeles
- Genre: Film score
- Length: 61:08
- Label: GNP Crescendo
- Producer: Dennis McCarthy

Dennis McCarthy chronology
Tonya and Nancy: The Inside Story (1994)	Star Trek Generations (1994)	The Colony (1995)

The musical score for the 1994 science fiction film Star Trek Generations is composed by Dennis McCarthy. Generations, the seventh Star Trek film overall, is directed by David Carson and based on the television series Star Trek: The Next Generation, which was also scored by McCarthy. He had to balance the score from the series and film score and emphasize the dramatic writing to complement the action onscreen. The album was released through the independent label GNP Crescendo Records on November 8, 1994.

== Background ==
Generations' score is written and composed by Dennis McCarthy, the principal composer for The Next Generation, thereby becoming the first Star Trek composer to work on both television and film projects. Despite being tasked with balancing the styles of both series, it offered him the opportunity for a stronger dramatic writing. The film's opening music is a choral piece that plays while a floating champagne bottle tumbles through space. For the action scenes with the Enterprise-B, McCarthy made use of low brass chords and Kirk's theme provided with brass motif accented by snare drums, a sound not used in the series, while the scene ends with dissonant notes as Scott and Chekov discover Kirk has been blown into space.

McCarthy expanded the brass notes for the film's action sequences, such as the battle over Veridian III and the crash-landing of the Enterprise-D. He additionally used choral pieces and synthesizers when Picard goes to the Nexus to discover his family. According to McCarthy it was the hardest part to score, as editor Steve Rowe used the Adagietto from Gustav Mahler's fifth symphony as a temp track for that sequence and after listening to that piece he found it difficult to get it out of his head. He then decided to shift the piece from minor to major, resembling Phil Spector's production. The piece was performed by Los Angeles Master Chorale and a 100-piece orchestra. A broad fanfare is played when Picard and Kirk meet. It was the only distinct theme from the film, that blends his theme from the series' first season, notes from the Deep Space Nine theme and Alexander Courage's Star Trek theme.

The final battle sequence where Kirk and Picard fights against Soran, had McCarthy making use of staccatos to accentuate the fistfight and Kirk's death sequence is scored with lyrical strings with another statement of Courage theme in the conclduing moments. The score for Kirk's death sequence was composed 17 days before the film's release. He determined it as a panic score as he forgot to write the percussion in four bars which sounded like "Baby Elephant Walk" for four bars.

== Release ==
Generations' score was the first Star Trek album to be published commercially by the independent record label GNP Crescendo Records. Its founder Gene Norman's son, Neil Norman (who currently runs the label) has been a fan of science fiction films and liked the franchise's original series and films. In the early 1990s, Neil secured a licensing deal from Paramount Pictures to reissue soundtracks from Star Trek both its film and television incarnations which included James Horner's scores for The Wrath of Khan (1982) and The Search for Spock (1984). GNP Crescendo distributed the forthcoming Star Trek film soundtracks until early 2000. The album was released on November 8, 1994, on cassette tape and CD. The album consisted of 15 tracks from McCarthy's score with an additional 23 cues which were the film's sound effects.

== Track listing ==
Star Trek Generations (Original Motion Picture Soundtrack) track listing
No.	Title	Length
1.	"Star Trek Generations Overture"	4:13
2.	"Main Title"	2:52
3.	"The Enterprise B / Kirk Saves The Day"	3:13
4.	"Deck 15"	1:39
5.	"Time Is Running Out"	1:12
6.	"Prisoner Exchange"	2:57
7.	"Outgunned"	3:20
8.	"Out Of Control / The Crash"	2:05
9.	"Coming To Rest"	0:57
10.	"The Nexus / A Christmas Hug"	7:07
11.	"Jumping The Ravine"	1:37
12.	"Two Captains"	1:32
13.	"The Final Fight"	8:15
14.	"Kirk's Death"	2:45
15.	"To Live Forever"	2:40
16.	"Enterprise B Bridge (SFX)"	3:13
17.	"Enterprise B Doors Open (SFX)"	0:13
18.	"Distress Call Alert (SFX)"	0:10
19.	"Enterprise B Helm Controls (SFX)"	0:16
20.	"Nexus Energy Ribbon (SFX)"	1:38
21.	"Enterprise B Deflector Beam (SFX)"	0:08
22.	"Enterprise B Warp Pass-By (SFX)"	0:14
23.	"Enterprise D Transporter (SFX)"	0:12
24.	"Tricorder (SFX)"	0:30
25.	"Hypo Injector (SFX)"	0:03
26.	"Communicator Chirp (SFX)"	0:06
27.	"Door Chime (SFX)"	0:07
28.	"Enterprise D Warp Out #1 (SFX)"	0:22
29.	"Bird Of Prey Bridge / Explosion (SFX)"	2:51
30.	"Klingon Sensor Alert (SFX)"	0:08
31.	"Bird Of Prey Cloaks (SFX)"	0:04
32.	"Bird Of Prey De-Cloaks (SFX)"	0:10
33.	"Klingon Transporter (SFX)"	0:12
34.	"Soran's Gun (SFX)"	0:11
35.	"Soran's Rocket De-Cloaks (SFX)"	0:05
36.	"Shuttlecraft Pass-By (SFX)"	0:21
37.	"Enterprise D Bridge / Crash Sequence (SFX)"	3:21
38.	"Enterprise D Warp Out #2 (SFX)"	0:09
Total length:		61:08

== Reception ==
The score had a genuinely mixed reception, with Filmtracks' Christian Clemmensen stating "McCarthy's work is easily the weakest of the "modern" scores of the franchise, lacking the memorably powerful essence of the Goldsmith scores, the dramatic majesty of the Horner ones, and the rich balance of good and evil in the Eidelman one." Craig Lysy of Movie Music UK wrote "while the score lacks the dramatic and evocative power of earlier efforts, I must say that there are some fine moments worthy of your exploration." Daevid Jehnzen of AllMusic wrote "the soundtrack melds pieces of the television series' music with older themes from the first generations' films. The combination is exciting and well worth the time for dedicated Star Trek fans."

== Expanded edition ==
Star Trek Generations (Expanded Edition)

Film score (reissue) by Dennis McCarthy
- Released: October 29, 2012
- Genre: Film score
- Length: 138:38
- Label: GNP Crescendo
- Producer: Dennis McCarthy

On October 29, 2012, GNP Crescendo rereleased the soundtrack as a two-disc, expanded collector's edition including previously unreleased tracks.

=== Track listing ===
Star Trek Generations (Expanded Edition) track listing – Disc 1
No.	Title	Length
1.	"Main Title"	2:54
2.	"Past Glory"	1:19
3.	"The Enterprise B"	0:42
4.	"Distress Call / Harriman and the Ribbon"	4:27
5.	"Kirk Saves the Day / Deck 15 / HMS Enterprise"	4:50
6.	"Picard's Message / Raid Post Mortem"	4:43
7.	"Data and the Emotions"	0:54
8.	"Time is Running Out"	1:11
9.	"Data Malfunctions"	2:29
10.	"Soran Kidnaps Geordi"	2:44
11.	"Guinan and the Nexus"	2:47
12.	"Torture"	1:37
13.	"Soran's Plan Revealed"	1:49
14.	"Prisoner Exchange"	2:59
15.	"Outgunned"	3:22
16.	"The Gap / Coolant Leak / Appointment with Eternity / Out of Control / Blasted / The Crash"	5:43
17.	"Coming to Rest"	1:00
18.	"The Nexus"	1:32
19.	"A Christmas Hug / The Kitchen Debate"	8:03
20.	"Coming to Rest"	1:38
21.	"Two Captains / Crash Recap"	2:04
22.	"The Final Fight"	6:15
23.	"The Captain of the Enterprise (Kirk's Death)"	2:45
24.	"To Live Forever"	2:40
25.	"Star Trek: Generations Overture"	4:13
Total length:		74:40

Star Trek Generations (Expanded Edition) track listing – Disc 2
No.	Title	Length
1.	"Star Trek Generations Overture"	4:13
2.	"Main Title"	2:52
3.	"The Enterprise B / Kirk Saves The Day"	3:13
4.	"Deck 15"	1:39
5.	"Time Is Running Out"	1:12
6.	"Prisoner Exchange"	2:57
7.	"Outgunned"	3:20
8.	"Out Of Control / The Crash"	2:05
9.	"Coming To Rest"	0:57
10.	"The Nexus / A Christmas Hug"	7:07
11.	"Jumping The Ravine"	1:37
12.	"Two Captains"	1:32
13.	"The Final Fight"	8:15
14.	"Kirk's Death"	2:45
15.	"To Live Forever"	2:40
16.	"Enterprise B Bridge"	3:13
17.	"Enterprise B Doors Open"	0:13
18.	"Distress Call Alert"	0:10
19.	"Enterprise B Helm Controls"	0:16
20.	"Nexus Energy Ribbon"	1:38
21.	"Enterprise B Deflector Beam"	0:08
22.	"Enterprise B Warp Pass-By"	0:14
23.	"Enterprise D Transporter"	0:12
24.	"Tricorder"	0:30
25.	"Hypo Injector"	0:03
26.	"Communicator Chirp"	0:06
27.	"Door Chime"	0:07
28.	"Enterprise D Warp Out #1"	0:22
29.	"Bird Of Prey Bridge / Explosion"	2:51
30.	"Klingon Sensor Alert"	0:08
31.	"Bird Of Prey Cloaks"	0:04
32.	"Bird Of Prey De-Cloaks"	0:10
33.	"Klingon Transporter"	0:12
34.	"Soran's Gun"	0:11
35.	"Soran's Rocket De-Cloaks"	0:05
36.	"Shuttlecraft Pass-By"	0:21
37.	"Enterprise D Bridge / Crash Sequence"	3:21
38.	"Enterprise D Warp Out #2"	0:09
39.	"Prisoner Exchange" (film version)	2:59
40.	"A Christmas Hug" (choir only)	1:22
41.	"Lifeforms" (vocals by Brent Spiner)	0:17
Total length:		63:58

== Personnel ==
Credits adapted from liner notes

- Music composed, produced and conducted by – Dennis McCarthy
- Orchestrations – Brad Warnaar, Mark McKenzie, William Ross
- Orchestra supervisor – Dennis Yurosek
- Stage manager – Dominic Gonzales
- Maintenance engineer – Norm Dlugatch
- Second engineer – Paul Wertheimer
- Mixing – Robert Fernandez
- Mastering – Bob Fisher
- Music editing and sequencing – Bob Fisher, Mark Banning, Neil Norman
- Executive producer – Neil Norman, Mark Banning
- Liner notes – David Hirsch, Mark Banning
