= Music of Star Trek VI: The Undiscovered Country =

The music for the 1991 science fiction film Star Trek VI: The Undiscovered Country directed by Nicholas Meyer, based on Star Trek: The Original Series and the sixth film in the Star Trek franchise, features an original score composed by Cliff Eidelman. He produced a darker score that accentuates the film's theme in contrast to the epic themes in previous Star Trek films. The score was well received by critics and led Eidelman to being a prominent composer at that time.

== Development ==
Meyer initially planned to adapt Gustav Holst's orchestral suite The Planets in place of a traditional score which proved to be unfeasibly expensive. Later, he turned to Star Trek composers Jerry Goldsmith and James Horner, who declined to score the film. As a result, Meyer began listening to demo tapes submitted by composers and found most of them being generic film scores. However, he was intrigued by one of the tape submitted by a young composer named Cliff Eidelman, who scored for ballets, television and film. Eidelman submitted a tape for the studio and Meyer, while his agent submitted pieces for three of his tapes. In conversations with Eidelman, Meyer insisted him not to compose a bombastic opening that competed the main titles for the Star Trek films and since The Undiscovered Country being darker than its predecessors, it demanded something different musically as similar to Igor Stravinsky's The Firebird which had a foreboding and darker tone. Two days later, Eidelman produced a tape of his idea for the main theme, played on a synthesizer which Meyer was impressed by. He then approached producer Steven Charles-Jaffe with Eidelman's CD which the latter reminded him of Bernard Herrmann; Eidelman was subsequently given the task of composing the score.

"The film demanded it. It’s very possible to have written a score that sounded like one of the earlier films, but it would not have worked. This film had a darker and mysterious tone, plus all of the Shakespearean references [...] Combine that with my meeting with Nick, who said you can be darker and mysterious and that I did not have to go to the previous scores. He was asking me to go someplace new, which really felt comfortable being able to go off in my own direction. Looking back, I think that was a good choice."

— Cliff Eidelman

Eidelman began the project by compiling music from the predecessors and consciously avoided taking inspiration from those scores. As he was hired early on in production, he had an unusually long time to develop his ideas, and he was able to visit the sets during filming. While the film was in production, he worked on electronic drafts of the final score, to placate executives who were unsure about using a relatively unknown composer. He found science fiction the most interesting and exciting genre to compose for, and that Meyer told him to treat the film as a fresh start, rather than drawing on old Star Trek themes.

Eidelman wanted the music to aid the visuals; for Rura Penthe, he wanted to create an atmosphere that reflected the alien setting and used exotic instruments for color. Besides using percussions, he treated the choir as a percussion, with the Klingon language translation for "to be, or not to be" ("taH pagh, taHbe") played repetitively in the background. Spock's theme was designed to be an ethereal counterpart to the motif for Kirk and the Enterprise. Kirk's internal dilemma about what the future holds was echoed in the main theme. For the climactic battle, Eidelman produced a quite music in the beginning, which builds the intensity as the battle progresses.

Unlike the previous Star Trek scores, which was recorded at the Paramount Stage M in Record Plant, Los Angeles, the score for The Undiscovered Country was recorded in 20th Century Fox's Newman Scoring Stage. Eidelman conducted a 91-piece of the Hollywood Studio Symphony, which performed an hour of the film's music with orchestrations provided by Eidelman, Mark McKenzie and William Kidd. The score was recorded for a week at the studio with Eidelman taking 10 hours per day to compose the film score.

== Release ==
=== Original release ===
Star Trek VI: The Undiscovered Country

Film score by Cliff Eidelman
- Released: 1991
- Studios: Newman Scoring Stage, 20th Century Fox Studios, Los Angeles
- Genre: Film score
- Length: 45:18
- Label: MCA
- Producer: Cliff Eidelman

Cliff Eidelman chronology
Delirious (1991)	Star Trek VI: The Undiscovered Country (1991)	Tales from the Crypt (1992)

The soundtrack was released on December 10, 1991, through MCA Records and features thirteen tracks of score with a running time of forty-five minutes. Eidelman arranged much of the score in order, combining the cues and editing its length to build an effective listening environment as heard in a standalone album. In 2005, a bootleg copy of the soundtrack surfaced with thirty-six tracks of score and a running time of nearly seventy minutes.

No.	Title	Length
1.	"Overture"	2:57
2.	"An Incident"	0:53
3.	"Clear All Moorings"	1:39
4.	"Assassination"	4:45
5.	"Surrender For Peace"	2:46
6.	"Death Of Gorkon"	1:10
7.	"Rura Penthe"	4:22
8.	"Revealed"	2:38
9.	"Escape From Rura Penthe"	5:34
10.	"Dining On Ashes"	1:00
11.	"The Battle For Peace"	8:03
12.	"Sign Off"	3:13
13.	"Star Trek IV Suite"	6:18
Total length:		45:18

=== Expanded edition release ===
Star Trek VI: The Undiscovered Country (Expanded Edition)

Film score by Cliff Eidelman
- Released: February 27, 2012
- Genre: Film score
- Length: 112:30
- Label: Intrada
- Producer: Cliff Eidelman

Intrada Records released a two-disc set in 2012. The first disc is made up of the complete score and four extra cues which Eidelman had in its digital audio tape. The second disc contains the material from the original MCA release. Some of the alternate cues that composed were also for the promotional trailer. That cue, was considered to be a recording of a special session of how the main title being played with the orchestra and had a mix of three to four themes.

Disc 1
No.	Title	Length
1.	"Overture"	3:02
2.	"The Incident"	1:09
3.	"Spacedock/Clear All Moorings" (Contains theme from Star Trek composed by Alexander Courage)	1:59
4.	"Spock's Wisdom"	3:13
5.	"Guess Who's Coming"	0:49
6.	"Assassination"	2:16
7.	"Surrender for Peace"	2:48
8.	"The Death of Gorkon"	2:07
9.	"The Trial/Morally Unjust Evidence"	1:13
10.	"Sentencing"	1:02
11.	"Rura Penthe/First Sight of Rura Penthe"	4:09
12.	"Alien Fight"	1:05
13.	"First Evidence/The Search"	1:33
14.	"Escape From Rura Penthe"	5:35
15.	"The Mirror"	1:17
16.	"Revealed"	2:48
17.	"Mind Meld"	2:06
18.	"Dining on Ashes"	1:01
19.	"The Battle for Peace/The Final Chance for Peace/The Final Count"	8:15
20.	"The Undiscovered Country"	1:07
21.	"Sign Off" (Contains theme from Star Trek)	3:16
22.	"Star Trek VI End Credits Suite"	6:17
23.	"Trailer" (Contains theme from Star Trek) (take 10)	2:23
24.	"Guess Who's Coming" (alternate)	0:51
25.	"Sign Off" (Contains theme from Star Trek) (alternate)	3:31
26.	"Trailer" (Contains theme from Star Trek) (take 2)	2:20
Total length:		67:12

Disc 2
No.	Title	Length
1.	"Overture"	2:57
2.	"An Incident"	0:53
3.	"Clear All Moorings" (Contains theme from Star Trek)	1:39
4.	"Assassination"	4:45
5.	"Surrender for Peace"	2:46
6.	"Death of Gorkon"	1:10
7.	"Rura Penthe"	4:22
8.	"Revealed"	2:38
9.	"Escape From Rura Penthe"	5:34
10.	"Dining on Ashes"	1:00
11.	"The Battle for Peace"	8:03
12.	"Sign Off" (Contains theme from Star Trek)	3:13
13.	"Star Trek VI Suite"	6:18
Total length:		45:18

== Reception ==
According to Christian Clemmensen of Filmtracks.com, "while Jerry Goldsmith has been immortalized as having brought the most, musically speaking, to the Star Trek franchise, Eidelman's score for Star Trek VI remains a unique powerhouse." Thomas Glorieux of Maintitles wrote "Star Trek VI: The Undiscovered Country is rightly called the best non Horner / Goldsmith score for a Star Trek motion picture." Craig Lysy of Movie Music UK wrote "Eidelman correctly interprets the film’s dark narrative, perfectly attenuates his music to the film’s imagery and demonstrates compelling mastery of his craft. His expert interplay between seven themes, use of instruments and tonal coloring all join in a wondrous synergy to yield a magnificent musical journey that will echo through time." Jason Ankeny of AllMusic wrote "the climactic "The Battle for Peace" nevertheless recaptures the power and glory one expects from a Star Trek score, perfectly capping off the series' most fully rounded entry to date." Darren Franich of Entertainment Weekly wrote "Cliff Eidelman’s score is minor-key, insinuating, infesting. It puts you on edge."

== Personnel ==
Credits adapted from liner notes

Album credits

- Music composed, produced and conducted by – Cliff Eidelman
- Orchestra contractor – Carl Fortina
- Orchestrators – Cliff Eidelman, Mark McKenzie, William T. Kidd
- Recording – Armin Steiner
- Recorder – Brice H. Martin
- Mixing – Armin Steiner, Mike Matessino
- Mastering – Mike Matessino
- Music editor – Bunny Andrews
- Protools transferring – John Davis
- Music consultant – Mark McKenzie, William T. Kidd
- Music librarian – Emmett Estren
- Music coordinator – Kim Seiniger
- Copyist – Robert Bornstein
- Production manager – Frank K. DeWald, Jeff Eldridge, Regina Fake

Performer credits

- Bass – Bruce Morgenthaler, Buell Neidlinger, Claire Benoit, David Young, Margaret Storer, Susan Ranney, Timothy Barr
- Bassoon – David Riddles, Jack Marsh, Kenneth Munday
- Cello – Anne Karam (Goodman), Armen Ksajikian, Barbara Hunter, Christine Ermacoff, Dane Little, Gloria Lum, Harry Shlutz, Kevan Torfeh, Larry Corbett, Marie Fera, Matthew Cooker, Miguel Martinez, Nils Oliver, Paula Hochhalter, Roger Lebow, Ronald Cooper, Rowena Hammill, Stephen Erdody
- Clarinet – Charles Boito, Dominic Fera, Gary Gray, James Kanter, John E. Lowe, Roy D'Antonio
- Flute – Brice H. Martin, David Shostac, Geraldine Rotella, Louise Dissman (DiTullio), Susan Greenberg, Susan Fries
- French horn – Brad Warnaar, Brian O'Connor, David A. Duke, James Thatcher, Joseph Meyer, Phillip Yao, Steven Becknell, Todd Miller
- Guitar – Brice H. Martin, Ron D. Komie
- Harp – Dorothy Remsen, Gayle Levant
- Keyboards – Chet Swiatkowski, Elliot F. Solomon, Mark McKenzie, Ralph Grierson
- Oboe – John Winter, Thomas Boyd
- Percussion – Robert Zimmitti, Daniel Greco, Emil Radocchia (Richards), Joe Porcaro, Kenneth Watson, Peter Limonick, William T. Kidd
- Trombone – Alan Kaplan, Charles Loper, Craig Ware, Donald Waldrop
- Trumpet – Malcolm McNab, Mario Guarneri, Warren Luening
- Tuba – John T. Johnson, Norman Pearson
- Viola – Brian Dembow, Carole Castillo, Carrie Holzman-Little, Dan Neufeld, Denyse Buffum, Dmitri Bovaird, Donald McInnes, Herschel Wise, Kazi Pitelka, Kenneth Burward-Hoy, Linn Subotnick, E. Marcy Dicterow, Margot MacLaine, Michael Nowak, Mihail Zinovyev, Pamela Goldsmith, Renita Koven, Richard Gerding, Roland Kato, Victoria Miskolczy
- Violin – Anatoly Rosinsky, Barbara Porter, Barry Socher, Brian Leonard, Bruce Dukov, Claudia Parducci, Clayton Haslop, Connie Kupka, Constance Meyer, Daniel Shindaryov, Dimitrie Leivici, Dorothy Wade, Elizabeth Baker, Gordon Marron, Haim Shtrum, Harold Wolf, Harris Goldman, Helen Nightengale, Henry Ferber, Jacqueline Brand, James Getzoff, Jean Hugo, Jennifer Woodward, Julie Gigante, Karen Jones, Kathleen Lenski, Kenneth Yerke, Kimiyo Takeya, Lisa Johnson, Mari Botnick, Miwako Watanabe, Patricia Johnson, Patricia Aiken, Peter Kent, Ralph Morrison, Rebecca Barr, Reginald Hill, René Mandel, Richard S. Greene, Robert Peterson, Roger Wilkie, Ronald Folsom, Shari Zippert, Sheldon Sanov, Steven Scharf
