= 10 Cloverfield Lane (soundtrack) =

10 Cloverfield Lane (Original Motion Picture Soundtrack)

Film score by Bear McCreary
- Released: March 11, 2016
- Recorded: 2015–2016
- Genre: Film score
- Length: 63:32
- Labels: Sparks & Shadows; Paramount
- Producers: Bear McCreary; Joe Augustine; Steve Kaplan

Bear McCreary chronology
The Boy (2016)	10 Cloverfield Lane (Original Motion Picture Soundtrack) (2016)	Colossal (2017)

10 Cloverfield Lane (Original Motion Picture Soundtrack) is the soundtrack to the 2016 film 10 Cloverfield Lane, directed by Dan Trachtenberg and produced by J. J. Abrams under his Bad Robot production company. The film's score is composed by Bear McCreary and released under his Sparks & Shadows and Paramount Music label on March 11, 2016.

== Development ==
Bear McCreary was offered to score the film during June 2014. While he was unaware of the project, he received the script from the producers and after reading it, he found it exciting as it was "an absolute page-turner, just a gripping thriller". McCreary met Abrams and Trachtenberg to discuss the musical ideas which went on for six weeks. After their initial discussions, he sketched those ideas and visited on set to get a clarity on the musical landscape and build the sonic foundation for the score. Abrams could not fully participate in the musical discussions as he was directing Star Wars: The Force Awakens (2015) but joined it after completing the film. Trachtenberg found the musical score to evoke Bernard Herrmann's compositions for Alfred Hitchcock's films, but also takes inspiration from Ennio Morricone and Jerry Goldsmith's science fiction and thriller scores during the 1960s–1970s.

Since the film is mostly set in a contained environment, he wanted to develop a tense score which would be tight, close and claustrophobic but also provide an epic feel and develop the score bigger as the film is a part of a broader cinematic universe. Abrams' involvement, who had a keen eye on the film's music, pushed the score in a more cinematic direction and evolved the film's tone as well. The resultant score eventually became a culmination of the aforementioned factors which was a unique mix of sounds. The music in the first act had percussive sounds, for which McCreary used a blaster beam, most famous for its use in Star Trek: The Motion Picture (1979). Most of the film score had an orchestral palette but also blended propulsive percussion sounds with the addition of multiple instruments. It was considered to be the soul of the film. He used a Turkish instrument named the yaylı tambur which was prominently used in the score, and custom percussions made from the sounds of cans, barrels, cinderblocks, broken glass and hit machinery which McCreary recorded in his warehouse. Those sounds combined to provide a mix of orchestral, synth and electro-acoustic score jammed together in one.

== Release ==
The film score was released under McCreary's Sparks & Shadows and published by Paramount Music label on March 11, 2016, alongside the film. A vinyl edition was released through Mondo on March 10, 2017.

== Reception ==
Filmtracks.com wrote "10 Cloverfield Lane remains a truly engaging score that performs beyond most expectations." Pete Simons of Synchrotones called it as "an expertly executed thriller score, with a dense and warm orchestral sound, beautiful orchestrations and an attractive main theme". Sean Wilson of MFiles wrote "Although there's no denying that the 10 Cloverfield Lane score is often a challenge to listen to thanks to its near-relentless nature, what it also demonstrates is that McCreary is one of our finest modern-day musical storytellers." Stephanie Zacharek of Time wrote "The movie's finest feature may be Bear McCreary's playfully malicious score, a beehive of worried-sounding strings that channels the spirit of Hitchcock fave Bernard Herrmann." Justin Lowe of The Hollywood Reporter described it as a "brooding orchestral score". Brian Tallerico of RogerEbert.com wrote "Bear McCreary's overheated, Hermann-esque score will make anyone who's seen Psycho think of Marion Crane in the opening act of Hitchcock's classic." Peter Travers of Rolling Stone called it as a "pulsating score".

== Track listing ==
10 Cloverfield Lane (Original Motion Picture Soundtrack) track listing
No.	Title	Length
1.	"Michelle"	6:08
2.	"The Concrete Cell"	8:29
3.	"Howard"	5:00
4.	"A Bright Red Flash"	2:53
5.	"At the Door"	2:59
6.	"Two Stories"	2:46
7.	"Message from Megan"	3:07
8.	"Hazmat Suit"	3:01
9.	"A Happy Family"	3:52
10.	"The Burn"	6:14
11.	"Up Above"	3:03
12.	"Valencia"	6:12
13.	"The New Michelle"	3:25
14.	"10 Cloverfield Lane"	6:23
Total length:		63:32

== Credits ==
Credits adapted from liner notes.

- Music – Bear McCreary
- Album producer – Bear McCreary, Joe Augustine
- Score producer – Bear McCreary, Steve Kaplan
- Engineer – James Michael House
- Sound design – Jonathan Chau, Jonathan Snipes, Sam Ewing
- Recording and mixing – Steve Kaplan
- Recording assistance – John Grannan
- Mastering – Pat Sullivan
- Music editor – Michael Baber
- Music consultant – Charles Scott
- Score co-ordinator – Kaiyun Wong
- Album coordinator – Jason Richmond
- Scoring assistance – Allan Hessler, David Matics, Jason Akers, Jessica Rae Huber, Laurence Schwarz, Ryan Sanchez
- Score manager – Joanna Pane
- Package design – John Hofstetter
- Liner notes – Bear McCreary
- Executive in charge of music for Paramount Pictures – Randy Spendlove
- Executive producer – J. J. Abrams

Orchestra

- Orchestrators – Edward Trybek, Henri Wilkinson, Jonathan Beard
- Assistant orchestrators – Kory McMaster, Sean Barrett
- Conductor – Bear McCreary
- Orchestra contractor – Peter Rotter
- Vocal contractor – Jasper Randall
- Copyist – Andrew Harris

Instrumentalists

- Bassoon – Damian Montano, Kenneth Munday, Rose Corrigan
- Cello – Armen Ksajikian, Cecilia Tsan, Christina Soule, Dane Little, Dennis Karmazyn, Eric Byers, Erika Duke-Kirkpatrick, Evgeny Tonkha, Gabe DiMarco, George Kim Scholes, Giovanna Clayton, Jacob Braun, John Walz, Jonathan Beard, Joo Jee, Jordan Cox, Leah Metzler, László Mezö, Maurice A. Grants, Paula Hochhalter, Simone Vitucci, Stan Sharp, Stefanie Fife, Steven Velez, Tim Landauer, Tim Loo, Trevor Handy, Vanessa Freebairn-Smith, Victor Lawrence, Xiaodan Zheng, Steve Erdody
- Clarinet – Ralph Williams, Stuart Clark
- Contrabass – Bart Samolis, Christian Kollgaard, David Parmeter, Drew Dembowski, Edward Meares, Geoffrey Osika, Nico Carmine Abondolo, Stephen Dress, Thomas Harte, Michael Valerio
- Flute – Julie Burkert, Jenni Olson
- Harp – Jo Ann Turovsky
- Horn – Benjamin Jaber, Danielle Ondarza, Dylan Hart, John E. Mason, Katelyn Farudo, Mark Adams, Philip Edward Yao, Steve Becknell, Teag Reaves, Laura Brenes
- Oboe, English horn – Chris Bleth
- Trombone – William Reichenbach, Craig Gosnell, Phillip Keen, William Booth, Alexander Iles
- Trumpet – Daniel Rosenboom, James Wilt, Robert Schaer, David Washburn
- Tuba – Lukas Storm, Gary Hickman
- Viola – Brian Dembow, Darrin McCann, David Walther, Jessica Vanvelzen-Freer, John Zach Dellinger, Jonathan Moerschel, Keith Greene, Laura Pearson, Luke Maurer, Matthew Funes, Meredith Crawford, Pamela Jacobson, Robert A. Brophy, Shawn Mann, Vicki Miskolczy, Andrew Duckles
- Violin – Alyssa Park, Ana Landauer, Andrew Bulbrook, Benjamin Powell, Benjamin Jacobson, Bruce Dukov, Charlie Bisharat, Darius Campo, Erik Arvinder, Eun-Mee Ahn, Helen Nightengale, Irina Voloshina, Jay Rosen, Jennifer Munday, Jessica Guideri, Josefina Vergara, Julie Rogers, Katia Popov, Kevin Connolly, Leah Zeger, Lisa Liu, Lisa Sutton, Lorand Lokuszta, Lorenz Gamma, Luanne Homzy, Maia Jasper, Maya Magub, Natalie Leggett, Neli Nikolaeva, Paul Cartwright, Paul Henning, Phillip Levy, Radu Pieptea, Rafael Rishik, Rebecca Bunnell, Robert Anderson, Sandra Cameron, Sarah Thornblade, Serena McKinney, Sharon Jackson, Songa Lee, Tamara Hatwan, Tereza Stanislav, Julie Gigante

Soloists

- Blaster beam – Craig Huxley
- Strings – The Calder Quartet
- Yayli tanbur – Malachai Komanoff Bandy
- Vocals – Raya Yarbrough

== Accolades ==
Accolades for 10 Cloverfield Lane (Original Motion Picture Soundtrack)
Association	Category	Nominee(s)	Result	Ref.
Hollywood Music in Media Awards	Best Original Score – Sci-Fi/Fantasy Film	Bear McCreary	Nominated	
World Soundtrack Awards	Discovery of the Year	Bear McCreary	Nominated	
