= Craig Huxley =

American actor and musician (born 1954)

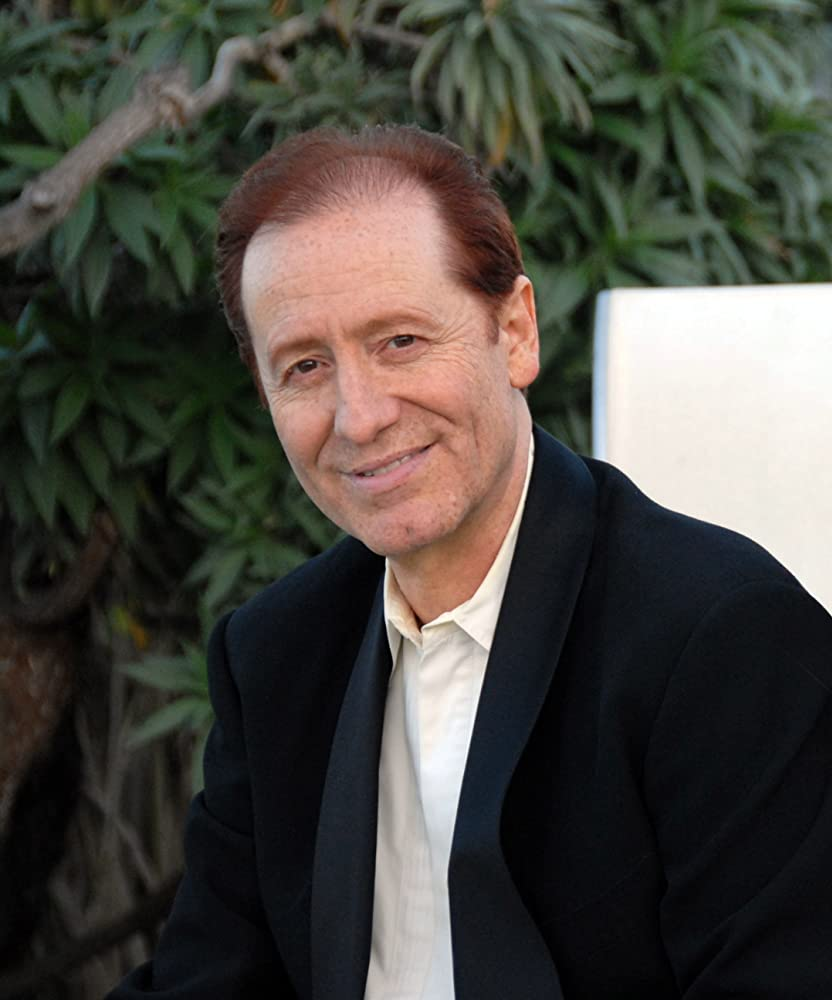
Craig Huxley

Craig Huxley (also known as Craig Hundley; born 1954) is an Emmy Award-winning producer, inventor, actor and musician. He received a Los Angeles NARAS MVP nomination from the Recording Academy, organization that runs the Grammy Awards.

In 1967, he portrayed Captain Kirk's nephew in the Star Trek episode "Operation Annihilate!". The following year, he played a different role in the episode "And the Children Shall Lead". He also guest starred on television in Bewitched, The Brady Bunch , Lancer , and Kung Fu.

His first album, Arrival of a Young Giant, was a trio album by Hundley (piano), Jay Jay Wiggins (bass), and Gary Chase (drums) that was released in 1968. Craig Hundley Plays with the Big Boys, from the following year, had a big band added to the trio. The 1970 release of his modernized adaptation of Rhapsody in Blue, also featured a big band, and included Larry Carlton on Guitar.

Huxley invented a musical instrument – an aluminum refinement of the blaster beam – in the 1970s. His design was patented in 1984. The instrument was featured in the soundtrack of Star Trek: The Motion Picture, and Huxley played it for the soundtrack to 10 Cloverfield Lane.

In 1985, Huxley conceived and built The Enterprise Studios, a recording studio complex in Burbank, California.

== Early life ==
Born on November 22, 1954, as Craig Hundley in Sherman Oaks, California. Where he attended Ulysses S. Grant High School, he showed early academic ability and received high marks during his secondary education (IQ of 184).

Huxley began studying classical piano at the age of nine. By age twelve he had shifted toward jazz, influenced particularly by pianist Bill Evans, as well as Oscar Peterson, Peter Nero, and George Shearing. Early commentary on his playing noted both strong technical ability and stylistic influences typical of young jazz performers.

As a teenager, Huxley also participated briefly in political activities. At age 11 Craig exchanged letters with President Lyndon Johnson, which led to being flown to Washington while chaperoned by Senator Pierre Salinger (who had the prior year been JFK's Press Secretary). He met with the President, walked on the Senate floor, and appeared with his report each day giving his youthful bird's-eye view on ABC TV news.

== Music career ==
=== 1960s - 1970s: Teen Jazz Musician ===
In the late 1960s, Huxley emerged as a young jazz pianist on the West Coast. He formed the "Craig Hundley Trio" while still in his teens and released their first album "Arrival of a Young Giant" on the World Pacific label, featuring him on piano, J.J Wiggings on bass, and Gary Chase on drums, the second album was “Craig Hundley Plays with the Big Boys” and included an orchestra arranged by Don Sebesky, along with the trio expanded with Larry Carlton on guitar.

The trio appeared on national television programs including The Jonathan Winters Show, The Tonight Show: Starring Johnny Carson, Today, and Showcase ’68, and performed at venues such as Shelly’s Manne-Hole in Los Angeles and the Village Gate in New York. They also appeared at the 1968 Monterey Jazz Festival and reportedly won a “Best Combo” award at a Battle of the Bands event that year. The group toured with singer Johnny Mathis and appeared on variety programs hosted by entertainers including Red Skelton, Jonathan Winters, and Steve Allen.

Early reports noted that Huxley handled most of the trio's arrangements and compositions. His initial training was in classical piano before he moved into jazz performance. Contemporary coverage also noted his interest in composition and experimentation with unusual time signatures, as well as performances blending classical and popular repertoire.

In 1969, performing under the name Craig Hundley, he released Rhapsody in Blue on World Pacific Records, a jazz-oriented interpretation of George Gershwin's composition featuring big-band arrangements.

=== 1970s: Experimental Phase ===
During the 1970s, Huxley transitioned from his earlier public profile as a teen jazz pianist into work centered on electronic instruments, television, and film music. Becoming increasingly interested in electronics, avant-garde styles, and instrument-building.

By the late 1970s he became associated with electronic sound work for major film productions. The same profile reports that he contributed “eerie sounds” to the Klingon sequence in Star Trek: The Motion Picture (1979) and later worked on synthesizer programming for Star Trek II: The Wrath of Khan, remaining involved with the film series through Star Trek V: The Final Frontier.

==== Blaster Beam ====
In the early 1980s, he formalized his instrument work the "Blaster Beam" U.S. patent record shows he received patent no. 4,462,295 (“Beam and cylinder sound instrument”), granted July 31, 1984 (filed August 20, 1982), which relates to a large electro-acoustic string instrument design associated with his later film and electronic-music work.

Conceived to generate otherworldly drones and tones suited for science fiction sound design, the Blaster Beam addressed Huxley's need for unconventional audio elements beyond standard synthesizers. The first prototype was hand-crafted in his workshop in 1975, initially for experimental recording sessions that explored its potential in atmospheric music production. Huxley's background as a session musician, where he honed skills in sound manipulation, directly informed this inventive process.

The sound of this instrument made it effective in science-fiction and suspense film scoring. The instrument gained widespread recognition through its prominent use in Jerry Goldsmith’s score for Star Trek: The Motion Picture (1979), where it was employed to represent the vast and non-human presence of the alien entity V’Ger. The Blaster Beam’s unique timbre contributed significantly to the film’s sonic identity and demonstrated how unconventional instruments could be integrated into large-scale orchestral scores.

Prior to its cinematic breakthrough, the instrument had already appeared on television, composer Stu Phillips stated that during the production of The Amazing Spider‑Man (1978) who sought to use inventive sounds in his score, including “weird percussion instruments — things like the Blaster Beam” to enhance the show's musical palette. As well as during the third season of Wonder Woman (1979), marking one of its earliest broadcast uses.

Craig playing his Blaster Beam has been featured on dozens of movies, TV episodes, streaming series and video games, within the Star Trek franchise, including James Horner’s score for Star Trek II: The Wrath of Khan (1982) and Craig's composition of "Genesis Project" reinforcing its association with large-scale, dramatic science-fiction narrative.

=== 1980s - 1990s: Sound Designer and Film Composer ===
In the early 80s Craig continued his career as a session musician and now film composer. Composing for Film and TV like Roadie (1980), Schizoid (1980), Alligator(1980), Americana (1981), Cat People (1982), Poltergeist (1982), Star Trek the Wrath of Khan (1982), Star Trek III: The Search for Spock (1984), Alfred Hitchcock Presents (1985).

Craig played and sound designed synthesizers on The Black Hole and Psycho II, he created electronic sound effects for Motel Hell and assisted with synthesizer processing on The Hand and Firefox. And was nominated for a Los Angeles NARAS MVP nomination from the Recording Academy, for synthesizers.

Craig collaborated with major artists Michael Jackson ("ET" Storybook Album, Bad and Thriller), Prince, Donna Summer, Barry White and Quincy Jones. Craig playing the blaster beam was also used for pure audio productions like Prince's Purple Rain, Michael Jackson's Man in the Mirror, and Quincy Jones' Ai No Corrida. As well as numerous films White Nights (1985), Aliens (1986), Dead Poets' Society, Back to the Future II and III (1989). In addition, he also worked on television shows like Knight Rider, Star Trek - The Next Generation, and The Orville.

==== The Enterprise Studios ====
In the mid-1980s, The Enterprise Studios came to life in Burbank California. A 10,000 sq foot multi-room complex with geometric shapes and pastel colors. Craig became involved in recording-studio production and electronic music entrepreneurship. The studio was reportedly in regular use by major performers and recording projects, and Huxley often participated in sessions as a producer, performer, or instrument designer, including work involving his experimental electronic instruments.

Enterprise Studios operated as a commercial recording complex used for music production, film scoring, and audio post-production. Industry trade publications described the facility as incorporating contemporary digital recording technologies during a period of transition toward computer-based and hybrid analog-digital production. Some of the projects in The Enterprise have included Aerosmith with Mike Shipley engineering, Celine Dion with David Foster at the helm, Mariah Carey with producer Randy Jackson, and Paul Westerberg working with Don Was. It has also been host to scoring projects engineered by Bobby Fernandez and Armin Steiner, among others. Mix projects have run the gamut from film scores for Africa the Serengeti, Ring of Fire and Boyz II Men Live to music projects for Alan Parsons, Eric Clapton, the Allman Brothers and Beck, Bogart & Apice.

Huxley remained owner and producer at the studio, where he worked on music recording, electronic-music releases associated with the Sonic Atmospheres label, and various audio production projects. The facility also hosted sessions for commercial music releases, film and television scoring, and documentary audio production.

==== SlingShot Entertainment ====
In the late 1990s through the 2000s Craig founded and led a DVD production venture called SlingShot Entertainment, a home video distributor based in Burbank, California. Craig launched this company on March 19, 1997, producing and releasing the first commercial DVD in US history and led the company in various distribution milestones such as early IMAX and 3D DVD releases -Animation Greats!, Africa, The Serengeti – IMAX, Antarctica, An Adventure - IMAX and Tropical Rainforest – IMAX. It specialized in releasing films originally shown in large-format theaters (such as IMAX) on DVD and VHS, effectively making specialized documentary and nature films available for home audiences. For example, catalog records list The World of Youssou N'Dour, and DVD editions of large-format IMAX titles like Grand Canyon: The Hidden Secrets, Jane Goodall's Wild Chimpanzees, Lost Worlds, Kingdom of the Tiger, Ring of Fire, Kilimanjaro, Legend of Loch Lomond and Yellowstone issued by Huxley's SlingShot Entertainment, often remastered from their original IMAX presentations and published in the early 2000s.

=== 2000s ===
During the 2000s, Craig Huxley continued operating Enterprise Studios. In 2016 Craig performed the Blaster Beam for every single cue in the film 10 Cloverfield Lane produced by J.J Abrams and composed by Bear McCreary. In 2019, Huxley played the Blaster Beam on Doctor Sleep(2019), based on Stephen King Horror Sequel to "The Shining".

=== 2020s ===
In 2023 Huxley played his Blaster Beam in Season 3 of Star Trek: Picard, as the sound of the Shrike, Captain Vardic's ship.

In 2026, Huxley appeared at the 60th-anniversary Star Trek Las Vegas convention run by Creation Entertainment, participating in four panels and presenting demonstrations of his Blaster Beam, the instrument he performed on for Star Trek: The Motion Picture, Wrath of Khan, Star Trek: Picard and Strange New Worlds.
