= TrekMovie.com =

Star Trek media franchise website

- Website type: Fan site
- Headquarters: Los Angeles
- Country of origin: United States
- Owner: SciFanatic Network
- Founder: Anthony Pascale
- Editor: Kayla Iacovino
- Employees: 12
- Website: www.trekmovie.com
- Commercial: No
- Registration: Free
- Launched: July 15, 2006
- Current status: Online

TrekMovie.com is a news website about the Star Trek media franchise. It features news reports about the feature films, television and web series, and other related Star Trek fandom.

== History ==
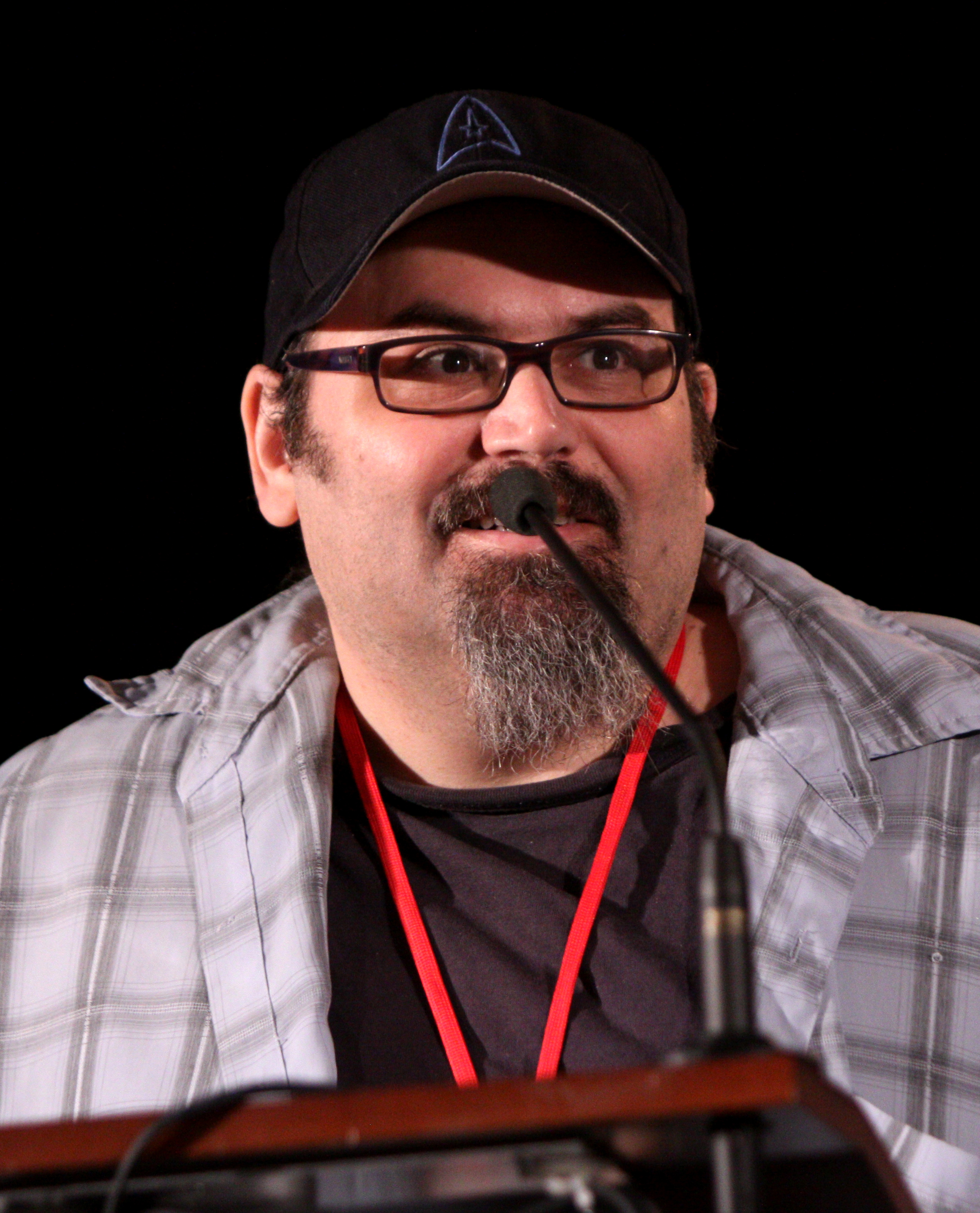
Anthony Pascale, founder of TrekMovie.com.

The site was founded by Trek fan Anthony Pascale as a site focused on bringing accurate and up-to-date news and information about Star Trek. The site TrekMovie.com was launched as The Trek XI Report on July 15, 2006, the same day it was announced that J. J. Abrams would direct Paramount Pictures' new Star Trek. In August 2006 the site moved and was renamed to TrekMovie.com. It gained a reputation for scooping Star Trek news and has been cited as a source by websites like Slashdot, SciFiWire, Yahoo! Movies and others. Pascale and his site have also been cited on the G4TV, various local TV stations and in The Wall Street Journal.

TrekMovie.com continued to grow as a range of editors and contributors—respected experts covering different areas of the Star Trek franchise—were brought on. The site was the highest ranked Star Trek news site in 2008.

In September 2013, the site was a source of controversy following the release of Star Trek Into Darkness. Guest writer Joseph Dickerson's op-ed "Is Star Trek Broken?" opined that Into Darkness had moved too far from the themes that made Star Trek relevant and popular. The op-ed generated thousands of comments, including harsh reaction by the co-writer of the film Roberto Orci. Orci's comments—which criticized fans' negative reactions, dismissed the op-ed, and ultimately suggested that detractors "fuck off"—were covered by multiple news sites. Orci later apologized and briefly stopped commenting on TrekMovie.
