= Blaster beam =

Electronic musical instrument

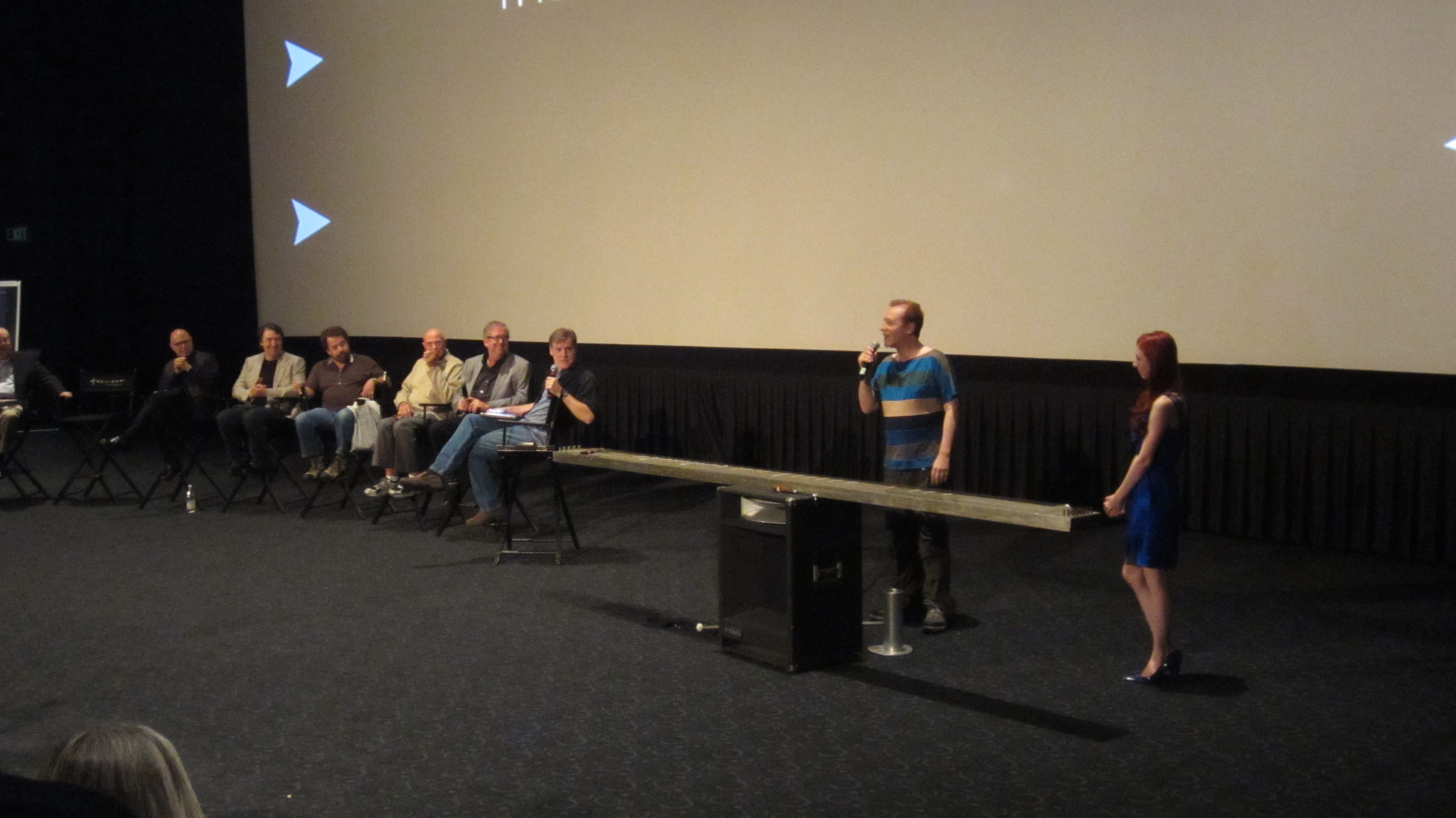
Craig Huxley demonstrates the blaster beam at a June 2012 screening of Star Trek: The Motion Picture in Los Angeles, CA

The blaster beam is a concept electric musical instrument consisting of a 12 to 18-foot (3.5 to 5.5 m) long metal beam strung with numerous tensed wires under which are mounted electric guitar pickups which can be moved to alter the sound produced. The instrument is played by plucking the strings with fingers or striking with sticks, pipes or even large objects. The instrument produces a very distinctive bass tone, the sound of which is often described as 'dark' or 'sinister'.

The blaster beam was designed by John Lazelle in the early 1970s, and was first widely used by Francisco Lupica who built several out of iron. American child-actor-turned-musician Craig Huxley created his own refined version of the beam out of aluminum which was brought to fame in the soundtrack for Star Trek: The Motion Picture (1979) in which composer Jerry Goldsmith used the instrument to create the signature V'ger sound. Earlier that year, Huxley performed his custom-built blaster beam on Robert Prince's score for the season three Wonder Woman episode "Spaced Out". The instrument was also used by composer James Horner for several of his early soundtracks, including Battle Beyond the Stars (1980) and Star Trek II: The Wrath of Khan (1982), Michael Stearns for his score to the IMAX film Chronos, and in David Shire's soundtrack to 2010 (1984), which score was co-written by Huxley. Huxley also played the instrument on the Quincy Jones song, "Ai No Corrida”.

Huxley successfully patented his design of the beam in 1984.

The instrument has since been used to create dark unnatural sounds in other movie soundtracks in the late 1970s and early 1980s, including the films The Black Hole, Forbidden World, Dreamscape, and Meteor, in the last of which it was used during shots of the giant looming meteorite as it approached Earth. It has also been used by new age artists including Kitaro, Stearns and Huxley. The blaster beam was also used for the seismic charge sound used by Jango Fett, in Star Wars: Episode II – Attack of the Clones.

Some more unexpected attention came in the early nineties when several women attending a music concert in New York's Central Park claimed to have been stimulated by the sound created by a blaster beam being used in the performance. This prompted Australian radio station 2SER-FM to conduct an experiment in which they played a continuous loop of a blaster beam performance and asked their female listeners to report any stimulation they experienced. (FM's frequency response typically starts at around 50 Hz which is similar to the theoretical lowest frequencies of the blaster beam, but these frequencies might have been more prominent at the live concert.) On this occasion none of the show's listeners reported any arousal whatsoever.

In 2016, composer Bear McCreary featured the Blaster Beam in his score to 10 Cloverfield Lane, performed by Craig Huxley.

In 2026, the blaster beam was played by Huxley at the 60th-anniversary Star Trek Las Vegas convention run by Creation Entertainment showcasing the same atmospheric sounds Huxley used for the Star Trek: The Motion Picture, Wrath of Khan and Strange New Worlds.
