= Theme from Star Trek =

Instrumental musical piece

The "Theme from Star Trek" (originally scored under the title "Where No Man Has Gone Before") is an instrumental musical piece composed by Alexander Courage for Star Trek, the science fiction television series created by Gene Roddenberry that originally aired between September 8, 1966, and June 3, 1969.

== History ==
The theme plays over both the opening and closing credits of the original series; the opening credits begin with the now-famous "where no man has gone before" monologue recited by series star William Shatner. Accompanied by an opening fanfare, the main theme begins, punctuated at several points by the Enterprise flying toward and past the camera with a "whoosh" sound for dramatic effect, created vocally by Courage. A slightly longer version of the theme, minus the eight-note fanfare, plays over the closing credits, which were overlaid on a series of stills from various episodes.

Courage identified the Richard Whiting song "Beyond the Blue Horizon" as his inspiration for the main part of the theme, giving him the idea for a song which was a "long thing that ... keeps going out into space ... over a fast-moving accompaniment." Rhythmically, the original score borrows from a Caribbean dance called the beguine.

The melody is sometimes said to have been performed on an ondes Martenot, an early electronic instrument. It was in fact performed by a singer.

The unaired pilot, "The Cage", used a wordless rendition of the melody line, sung by soprano Loulie Jean Norman with flute and organ, over an orchestral arrangement. When originally composed (and as heard in "The Cage"), Courage had Norman's vocalizations and the various instruments mixed equally to produce what Courage described as a unique "'what is that that I'm hearing?' sound." According to Courage, however, Gene Roddenberry had the mix changed to bring up the female vocal, after which Courage felt it sounded like a soprano solo. For the third season, the theme was again remixed, this time emphasizing the organ.

For the first several episodes, there was a concerto-like solo of an electric violin playing the melodic line, without any vocals. Norman's vocal was restored for the remainder of the season. Producer Herbert Solow recalled that Norman had been hired under a Screen Actors Guild agreement and that she would receive rerun fees for her part in the theme. For the second season onwards, her vocalization was dropped from the theme. Solow regretted the choice and composer Courage was not informed until twenty-seven years later.

The head of programming at NBC, Mort Werner, enjoyed the first pilot, but because he believed the series' potential had not been fully realized by the story's plot, he convinced the network to finance a second effort, an action that Roddenberry said, "shattered all television precedent." The unaired version of the second pilot episode used an entirely different main title theme, also composed by Courage. This version of the theme never aired; when the second pilot was re-edited for broadcast, it received the series standard titles and the original theme, minus the William Shatner opening narration (this was changed for home video).

In 2006, CBS began syndicating a "remastered" version of the series with numerous changes, including a re-recording of the theme music, which was used for all episodes of the series. Elin Carlson, a professional singer and lifetime Star Trek fan, recorded the replacement for Norman's vocalization.

Over time, the show's theme music has become immediately recognizable, even by many people who have never seen the program. Portions of the original theme have been used in subsequent Star Trek series and motion pictures. For 1979's Star Trek: The Motion Picture, scored by Jerry Goldsmith, Alexander Courage provided additional cues featuring his theme, where it softly accompanies the "captain's log" scenes. Dennis McCarthy reused the original theme's fanfare when he reworked Goldsmith's main theme for use as Star Trek: The Next Generation's theme music, where the fanfare precedes Goldsmith's theme. Most of the subsequent Star Trek motion pictures' main title themes started with the fanfare before segueing into music composed specially for the given film. The 2009 film Star Trek broke with this tradition; instead, composer Michael Giacchino used the opening notes sparingly in the movie but featured an arrangement of the theme in the film's end credits. All the Star Trek feature films to date use the fanfare at some point.

On March 7, 2011, Shatner, in character as Kirk, voiced a wake-up call for the crew of STS-133 in the Space Shuttle Discovery on its final day docked to the International Space Station. His call at 0723 UTC, reminiscent of the over-voicing on the original Star Trek series, was backed by the theme as he said, "Space, the final frontier. These have been the voyages of the Space Shuttle Discovery. Her 30-year mission: To seek out new science. To build new outposts. To bring nations together on the final frontier. To boldly go, and do, what no spacecraft has done before."

A prequel, spin-off series, Star Trek: Discovery (2017–2024), set 10 years before the original, twice featured a new recording of the theme: first during the closing credits of the Season 1 finale episode, "Will You Take My Hand?" (following the reintroduction of the U.S.S. Enterprise), and again at the start of the Season 2 episode "If Memory Serves", during a recap of "The Cage", of which the Discovery episode is a direct sequel.

== Lyrics ==
Without Courage's knowledge, Roddenberry wrote amateurish lyrics to the theme – not in the expectation that they would ever be sung, or indeed ever be made publicly available, but so that he could be registered as the lyricist of the theme and hence claim half the performance royalties. Although there was never any litigation, Courage stated that he considered the conduct unethical. Roddenberry responded, "Hey, I have to get some money somewhere. I'm sure not gonna get it out of the profits of Star Trek." The lyrics were published in Roddenberry and Stephen Whitfield's book, The Making of Star Trek, and were featured in an issue of the DC Comics Star Trek comic book, as "performed" by the character Uhura.

Series associate producer Robert Justman noted that work on the film Doctor Dolittle kept Courage from working on more than two episodes of the first season. Justman claims he was unable to convince Courage to return for the second season and believed that Courage lost enthusiasm for the series due to the "royalty" issue. This is in contradiction with Courage doing work on the show before its second season; conducting thirty minutes of library music (much of it newly composed) on June 16, 1967, including a new arrangement of the Star Trek theme; and returning again for the third season to score the episodes "The Enterprise Incident" and "Plato's Stepchildren".
