= Alexander Courage =

American composer (1919–2008)

- Born: Alexander Mair Courage Jr. December 10, 1919; Philadelphia, Pennsylvania, U.S.
- Died: May 15, 2008 (aged 88) Pacific Palisades, California, U.S.
- Genre: Soundtracks
- Occupations: Arranger, composer, musician

Alexander Mair Courage Jr. (December 10, 1919 – May 15, 2008) familiarly known as "Sandy" Courage, was an American orchestrator, arranger, and composer of music, primarily for television and film. He is best known as the composer of the theme music for the original Star Trek series.

== Early life ==
The son of a Scottish father and a French-American mother, Alexander "Sandy" Mair Courage was born in Philadelphia, Pennsylvania. His father Alexander Sr. immigrated to the United States in 1913 and obtained work in a munitions factory supplying France during World War I, where he met his future wife. They married in 1917.

While Sandy was still a young child, his father joined the Metropolitan Life Insurance Company as a salesman and moved the family to New Jersey. The family relocated regularly as his father earned promotions, requiring Sandy to switch schools.

His gift for music was noticed and encouraged at an early age. Courage’s father arranged for young Sandy to learn the bugle as his own father had been in a band and he himself was an enthusiastic parlor singer. When Courage wanted to learn the cornet, his father got him one.

Courage developed an uncanny ear for accompaniment. His tendency to play by ear what he wanted rather than play the music as written was a source of frustration, as he recalled, for his piano instructors: “I wanted to play Sousa marches and things like that. My uncle had a boys’ camp [in] Pennsylvania… When I was twelve, a new camper came in named Bobby Brecker. He had been to New York with his parents and seen a show there called The Band Wagon with Fred Astaire and his sister Adele, and he knew all the songs... I learned how to pick out the tunes with one finger and play what then used to be called a graveyard bass, which had no chords, just a sort of “thump” with the fist in rhythm with whatever the tune was [in] your right hand... That’s really where I got my start as a show pianist and little did I know that I would one day be writing arrangements for Fred Astaire in a movie called The Band Wagon. It’s really, really, really spooky in my life, how things like that have happened.”

== School ==
Courage later learned to play the trumpet and the French horn, as these instruments were available to him in school. In high school, Courage auditioned for and was chosen as the first solo player of the New Jersey All State High School Orchestra. Also in the orchestra was a violist for whom Courage was inspired to write a symphony, leading him to pursue music as a career.

Taking some preparatory theory lessons, Courage was admitted to the Eastman School of Music in 1937. He intended to study composition. Having never attempted it in a formal way before, Courage found the study challenging and failed his introductory composition course twice before passing the course in his senior year. While at Eastman, he switched majors multiple times and found the academic coursework ill-suited to his improvisational nature. At Eastman, he studied conducting under the composer Paul White (1895–1973).

In early 1940, Serge Koussevitzky auditioned Eastman students to join the Tanglewood Music Festival that summer. Courage succeeded in earning a spot at Tanglewood, where he met Richard Bales, Lenny Bernstein, and Thor Johnson.

In 1941, Courage graduated from Eastman with a degree in piano performance.

== Military service ==
Upon graduation, Courage moved to California to join a close friend Doris Atkinson who had graduated from Eastman a year earlier. He served in the United States Army Air Forces at March Field as a horn player, composer, arranger, and band leader. There, Courage launched and led a monthly radio program featuring band arrangements he wrote.

== Career ==
Once out of the army, Courage lived with his parents while looking for work. Through the wife of an army buddy, Courage met Bill Hatch, who hired Courage to work for CBS Radio. Around the same time, Atkinson introduced Courage to Herb Spencer, who introduced him to Ed Powell, who was looking for an orchestrator to recommend to Adolph Deutsch. Through these connections, Courage wrote and arranged music for several radio shows before following Deutsch to MGM.

Courage began as an orchestrator and arranger, working on such films as the 1951 Show Boat ("Life Upon the Wicked Stage" number); Hot Rod Rumble (1957 film); The Band Wagon ("I Guess I'll Have to Change My Plan"); Gigi (the can-can for the entrance of patrons at Maxim's); and the barn raising dance from Seven Brides for Seven Brothers.

He frequently served as an orchestrator on films scored by André Previn (My Fair Lady, "The Circus is a Wacky World", and "You're Gonna Hear from Me" production numbers for Inside Daisy Clover), Adolph Deutsch (Funny Face, Some Like It Hot), John Williams (The Poseidon Adventure, Superman, Jurassic Park, and the Academy Award-nominated musical films Fiddler on the Roof and Tom Sawyer), and Jerry Goldsmith (Rudy, Mulan, The Mummy, et al.). He also arranged the Leslie Bricusse score (along with Lionel Newman) for Doctor Dolittle (1967).

Apart from his work as a respected orchestrator, Courage also contributed original dramatic scores to films, including two westerns: Arthur Penn's The Left Handed Gun (1958) and André de Toth's Day of the Outlaw (1959), and the Connie Francis comedy Follow the Boys (1963). He continued writing music for movies throughout the 1980s and 1990s, including the score for Superman IV: The Quest for Peace (1987), which incorporated three new musical themes by John Williams in addition to Courage's adapted and original cues for the film. Courage's score for Superman IV: The Quest for Peace was released on CD in early 2008 by the Film Music Monthly company as part of its boxed set Superman - The Music, while La-La Land Records released a fully expanded restoration of the score on May 8, 2018, as part of Superman's 80th anniversary.

Courage also worked as a composer on such television shows as Daniel Boone, The Brothers Brannagan, Lost in Space, Eight Is Enough, Voyage to the Bottom of the Sea, and Judd, for the Defense. Young Dr. Kildare and The Brothers Brannagan were the only television series besides Star Trek for which he composed the main theme.

The composer Jerry Goldsmith and Courage teamed on the long-running television show The Waltons in which Goldsmith composed the theme and Courage the Aaron Copland-influenced incidental music. In 1988, Courage won an Emmy Award for his music direction on the special Julie Andrews: The Sound of Christmas. In the 1990s, Courage succeeded Arthur Morton as Goldsmith's primary orchestrator.

Courage and Goldsmith collaborated again on orchestrations for Goldsmith's score for the 1997 film "The Edge."

Courage frequently collaborated with John Williams during the latter's tenure with the Boston Pops Orchestra.

== Family ==
At the age of 35, Courage married Mareile Beate Odlum on October 6, 1955.

Mareile, born in Germany, was the daughter of Rudolf Wolff and Elisabeth Loechelt. After Wolff's suicide Elisabeth married Carl Wilhelm Richard Hülsenbeck, renowned for his involvement in the Dada movement in Europe. Hülsenbeck brought his wife (Elisabeth), son (Tom) and step-daughter (Mareile) to the United States in 1938 to avoid the political situation rapidly developing in Europe. After arriving in the US he changed his last name to Hulbeck.

Mareile's marriage to Courage was her third. Her second marriage was to Bruce Odlum (son of financier Floyd Odlum) in 1944. That union produced two sons, Christopher (born 1947) and Brian (born 1949), before it ended in divorce in 1952. When Courage married Mareile he accepted the responsibility of acting stepfather to them. The family originally lived together on Erskine Drive in Pacific Palisades, but later moved to a mountainside home on Beverly Crest Drive in Beverly Hills.

Aside from his musical abilities Courage was also an avid and accomplished photographer. He took many dramatic photos of bullfights and auto racing. He was a racing enthusiast, and his interest in that sport and photography brought him into contact with many racing personalities of the era, notably Phil Hill and Stirling Moss, both of whom he considered friends. Moss paid at least one social visit to the Erskine residence.

Though a dedicated stepfather to Christopher and Brian, Courage's musical career took precedence over his familial responsibilities. He sought to interest his step-children in music, and was responsible for arranging Brian's first musical lessons, on alto saxophone. Later in life Brian became a composer of serious electronic music, though the vocation was not apparent during his childhood, as he was a poor saxophone student.

Alexander and Mareile were divorced April 1, 1963. Courage subsequently married Kristin M. Zethren on July 14, 1967. That marriage also ended in divorce in 1972.

== Star Trek theme ==
Courage is best known for writing the theme music for the original Star Trek series, and other music for that series. Courage was hired by Star Trek creator Gene Roddenberry to score the original series at Jerry Goldsmith's suggestion, after Goldsmith turned down the job.

Courage went on to score incidental music for episodes "The Man Trap" and "The Naked Time" and some cues for "Mudd's Women." Courage reportedly became alienated from Roddenberry when Roddenberry claimed half of the theme music royalties. Roddenberry wrote lyrics for the song, not for them to be sung but so he could be legally credited as the composition's co-writer. Courage was replaced by composer Fred Steiner who was hired to write the musical scores for the remainder of the first season.

After sound editors had difficulty finding the right effect, Courage himself made the "whoosh" sound heard while the Enterprise flies across the screen.

He returned to Star Trek to score two more episodes for the show's third and final season, episodes "The Enterprise Incident" and "Plato's Stepchildren," allegedly as a courtesy to Producer Robert Justman.

Notably, after serving as Goldsmith's orchestrator when Goldsmith composed the music for Star Trek: The Motion Picture, Courage orchestrated Goldsmith's adaptation of his original Star Trek theme.

Following Star Trek: The Motion Picture, Courage's opening fanfare to the Star Trek theme became a memorable musical cue. The fanfare has been used in multiple motion pictures and television series, notably Star Trek: The Next Generation and the four feature films based upon that series, three of which were scored by Goldsmith.

== Death ==
Courage had been in declining health for several years before he died on May 15, 2008, at the Sunrise assisted-living facility in Pacific Palisades, California. He had suffered a series of strokes prior to his death. His mausoleum is in Westwood Village Memorial Park Cemetery.
