= Roddenberry Archive =

Digital archive project

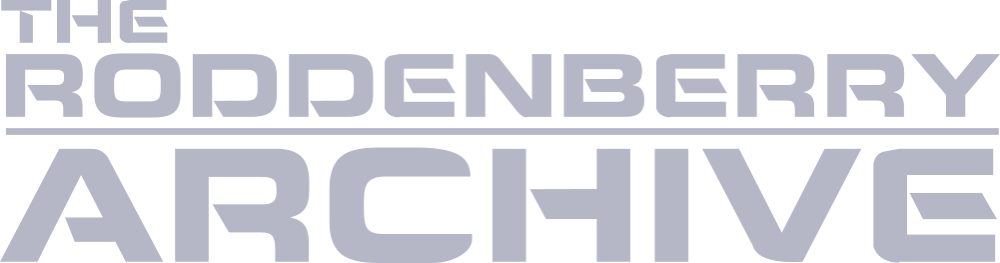

The Roddenberry Archive is a collaboration between the estate of Star Trek creator Gene Roddenberry and computer graphics company OTOY to digitally preserve assets related to the Star Trek franchise. It was announced in August 2021 by Gene's son Rod Roddenberry and OTOY founder and CEO Jules Urbach. The archive is curated by longtime Star Trek production artists Mike and Denise Okuda, Doug Drexler, and Daren Dochterman. It was made available in 2024 through The Archive, a mixed reality app for the Apple Vision Pro.

In addition to preserving documents, images, blueprints, and models from Gene's career, the archive team began digitally recreating the starship USS Enterprise and other aspects of Star Trek stories. The archive also has featurettes and documentaries made from interviews with people connected to the Star Trek franchise, and several virtual tour videos based on the digital recreations. Archive expansions have been tied to the release of new Star Trek media, with specific projects focusing on "The Cage" (1964), the first pilot episode for Star Trek: The Original Series (1966–1969); and the film Star Trek Generations (1994).

The archive team began creating a series of short concept videos in 2022, using new technology to visualize past actors and previously unfilmed imagery from the franchise. "765874 – Unification", a short released in 2024, received positive reactions from fans and commentators. The use of digital technology to recreate the likeness of dead actors received mixed reactions and led to further discussion.

== History ==
=== Announcement and first project ===
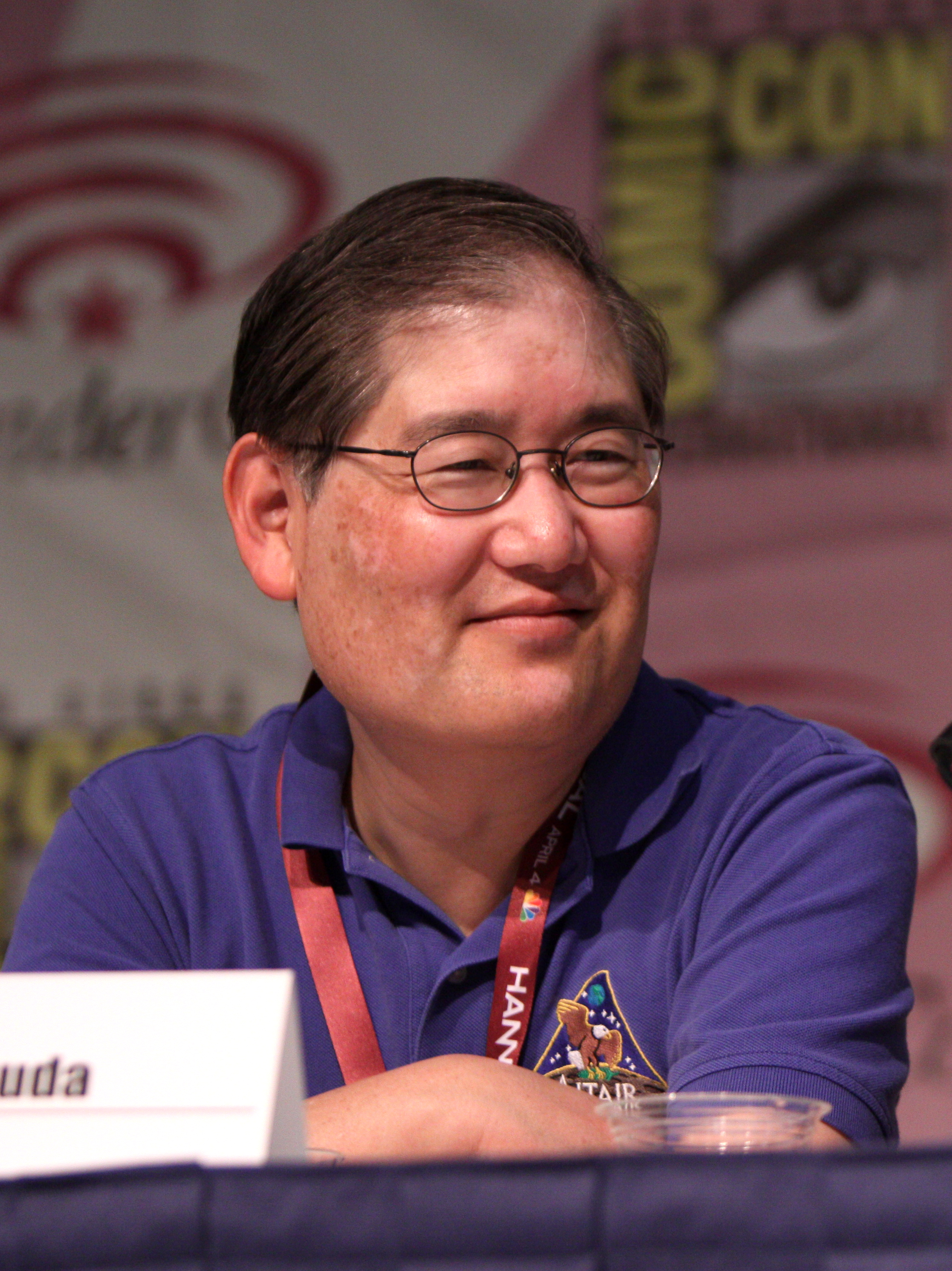
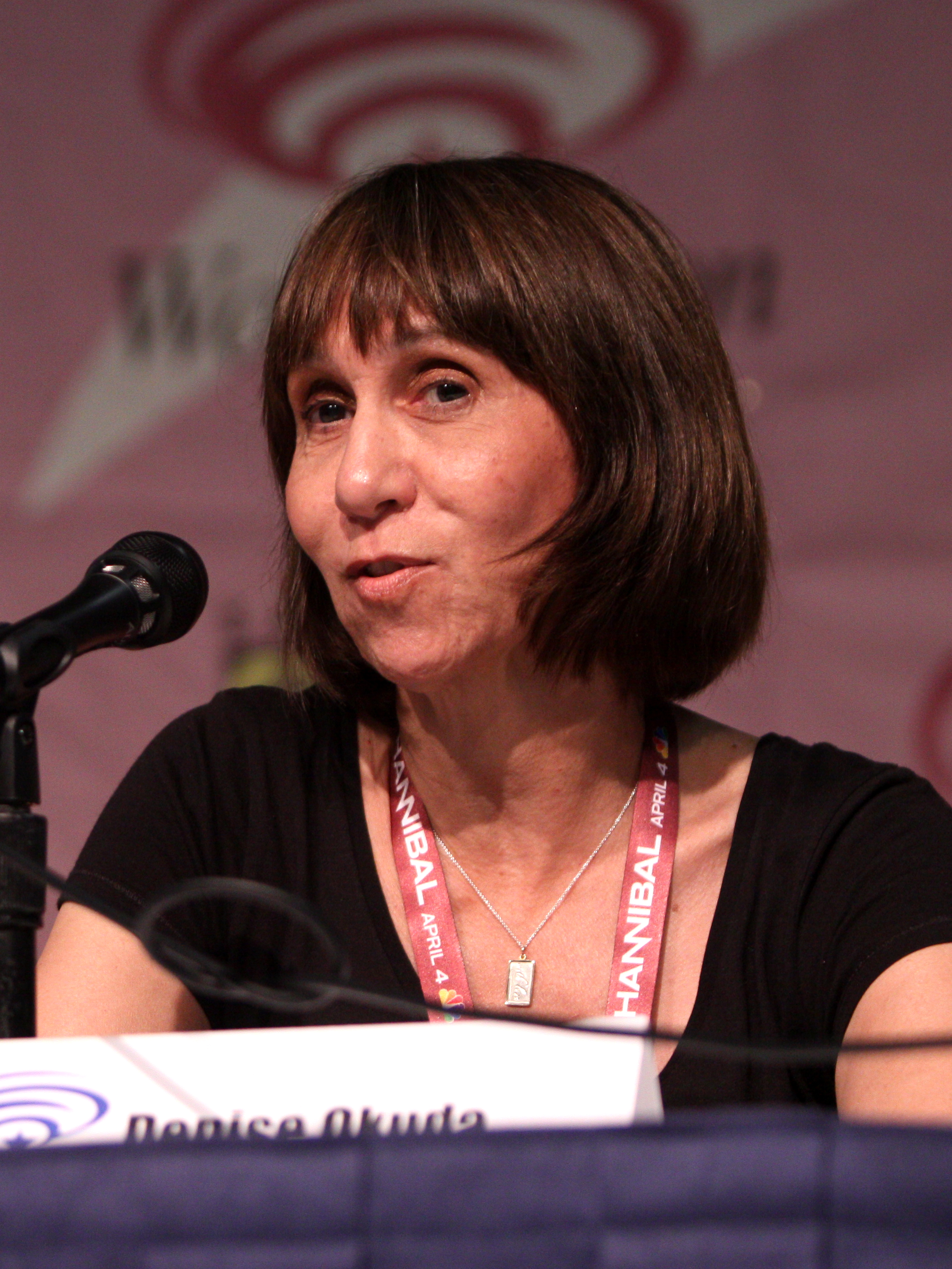
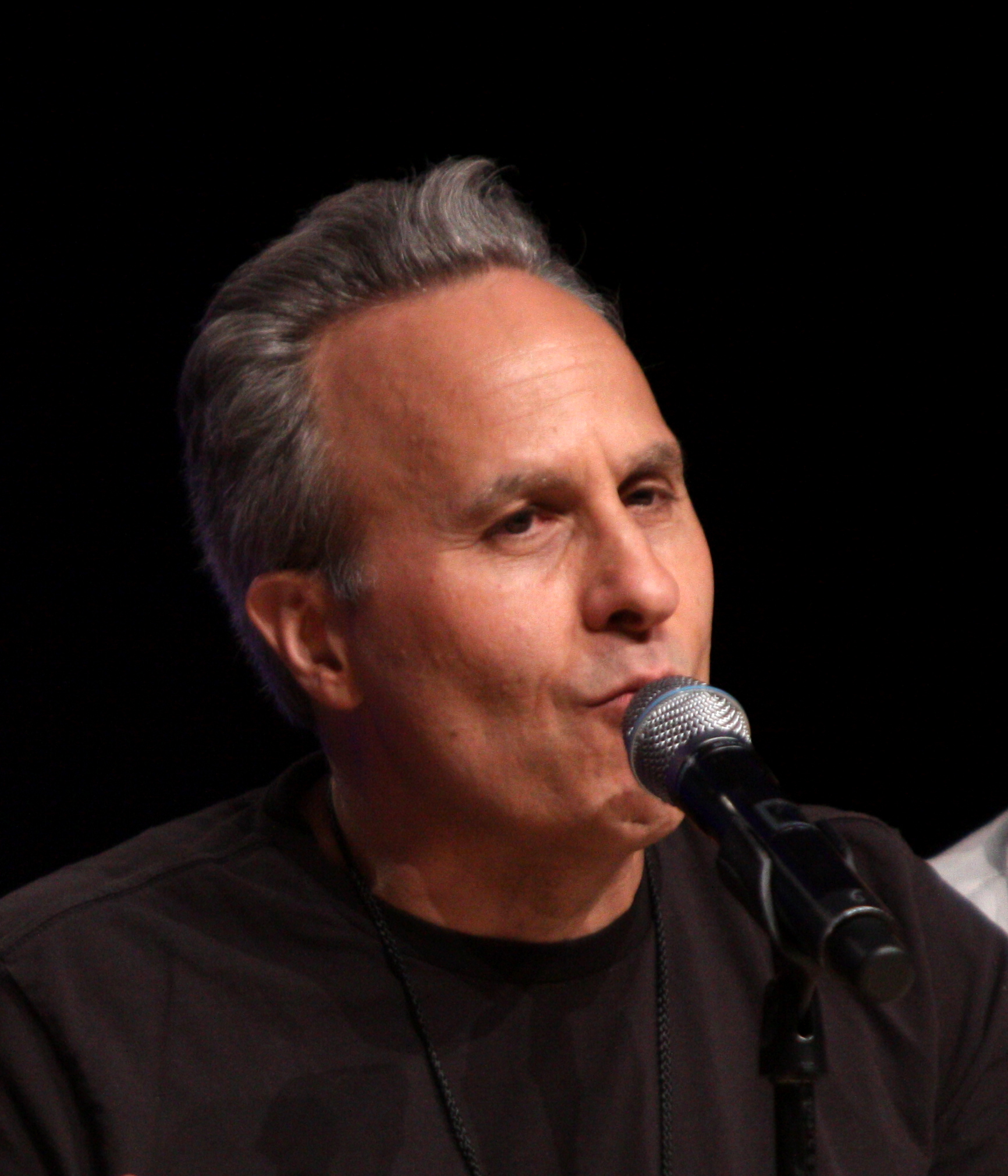
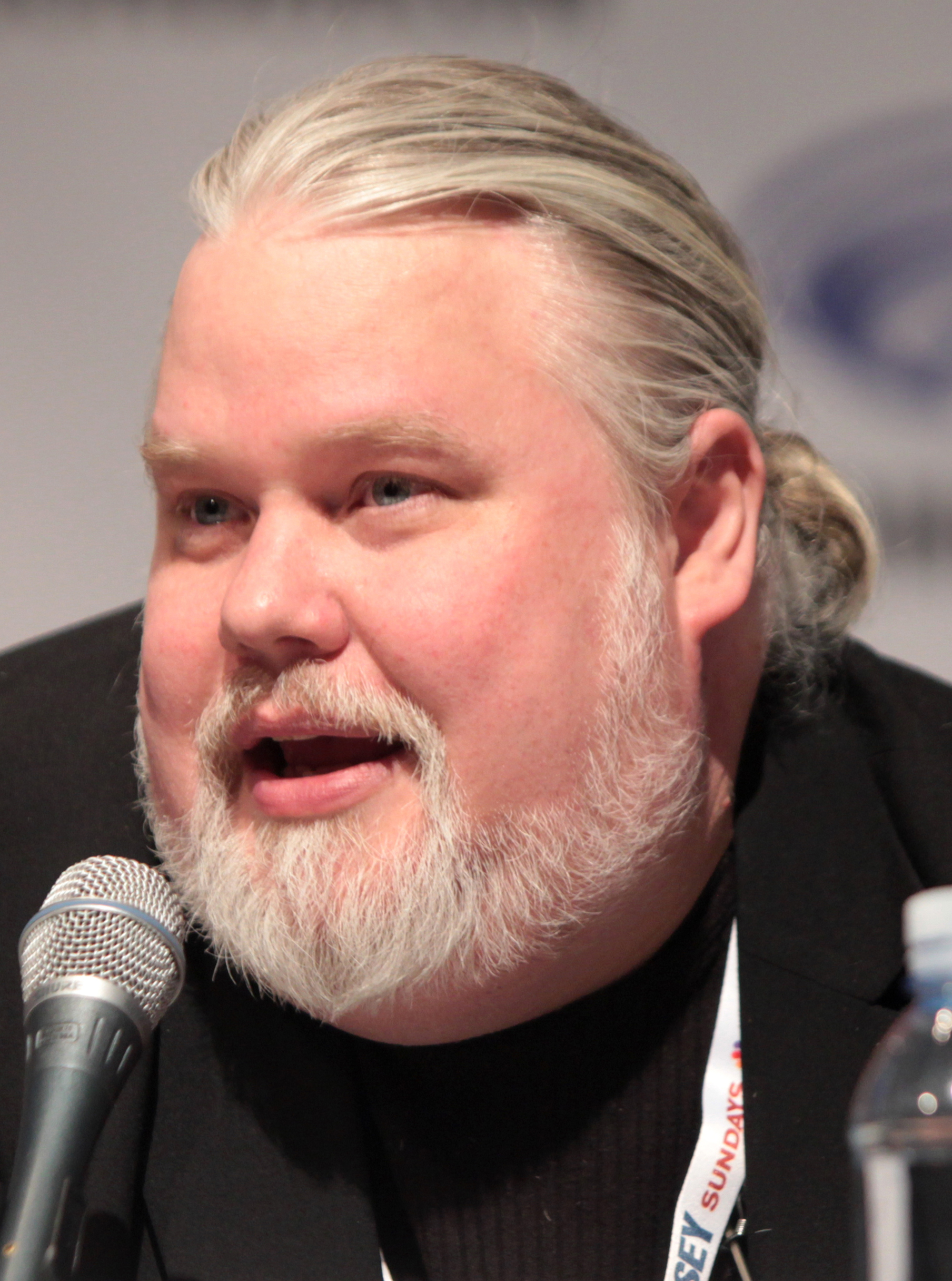
Longtime Star Trek production artists Mike and Denise Okuda, Doug Drexler, and Daren Dochterman curate the Roddenberry Archive

The Roddenberry Estate and computer graphics company OTOY announced a partnership called the Roddenberry Archive in August 2021, around the 100th birthday of Star Trek creator Gene Roddenberry, who died in 1991. OTOY founder and CEO Jules Urbach, a childhood friend of Gene Roddenberry's son Rod Roddenberry, worked on the Roddenberry Vault Blu-ray that was released for the 50th anniversary of the first Star Trek series, Star Trek: The Original Series (1966–1969). The archive was being curated by longtime Star Trek production artists Mike and Denise Okuda, Daren Dochterman, and Doug Drexler. Key documents, images, blueprints, and models from Gene's career were captured digitally using OTOY's LightStage scanning software and stored on the company's RNDR blockchain computing network. OTOY previously announced archives for the art of Mike "Beeple" Winkelmann, an OTOY board member, and illustrator Alex Ross; Winkelmann joined the Roddenberry Archive as a creative consultant and Ross provided new art for it.

In addition to recording behind-the-scenes materials, the archive team wanted to capture completed visuals from the franchise. Urbach said they thought a full internal digital recreation of the starship USS Enterprise would be an ambitious but realistic first project. They chose to base it on the ship's appearance in Star Trek: The Motion Picture (1979), as that refit version of the NCC-1701 had the most available data. The team worked with holographic display company LightField Lab on the recreation, which was described as a "fully immersive holographic installation experience". It includes all rooms seen in the film as well as others based on reference designs, blueprints, and other research. The 100 GB digital model was featured during Apple's October 2021 keynote event, demonstrating the capacity of the Apple M1 Pro chip to hold that amount of data.

While working on the Enterprise recreation, the archive team decided to expand the scope of the Roddenberry Archive. Urbach said they wanted it to be a full "history of Star Trek, not just the assets, not just the props, but the stories—the timeline in visual form—to the best of our abilities." They made a goal to eventually recreate every version of the Enterprise.

=== "The Cage" project and first concept videos ===
The Roddenberry Archive announced a project in May 2022 dedicated to "The Cage" (1964), the first pilot episode for The Original Series. Sets, props, costumes, and characters from the episode were recreated virtually, including a life-size version of the Enterprise's original bridge set. Robert Butler, the episode's director, provided hours of behind-the-scenes material to the archive and reviewed the recreated sets in March of that year. By that time, Star Trek: Picard (2020–2023) production designer Dave Blass had joined the archive team. Lora Johnson, author of the reference book Mr. Scott's Guide to the Enterprise (1987), was consulted for the starship recreations. In addition to Butler, interviews took place on the recreated sets with Christopher Hunter, the son of Jeffrey Hunter who played Captain Christopher Pike in the episode; Sean Kenney, who replaced Jeffrey Hunter as Pike for later episodes of The Original Series; and Sandra Lee Gimpel, who portrayed a Talosian in "The Cage".

Laurel Goodwin, who played J. M. Colt in the episode, was expected to be interviewed but died earlier that week. After noticing a resemblance between Urbach's wife Mahé Thaissa and Goodwin's portrayal of Colt, the archive team planned to accompany Goodwin's interview with new footage of Thaissa as Colt on the recreated sets, filmed using virtual production techniques. Carlos Baena, who joined OTOY as a freelance director in early 2022, directed a short concept video featuring Thaissa as Colt that was released under the title "765874". Footage from the interviews was also released in 2022 as "supplemental video logs".

The archive's recreations of "The Cage" sets and assets were made available for fans to explore using a television and game controller at the 56-Year Mission: Las Vegas fan convention in August 2022. Urbach reiterated their plan to eventually use immersive technologies, such as holographic displays, to allow people to walk through the recreated sets in a similar way to the franchise's holodeck technology. Also at the convention, a panel was held with members of the archive team. Moderated by Gates McFadden, who plays Beverly Crusher in the franchise, they discussed their progress with the archive and showed a new concept video, "765874 – Memory Wall", which expands on the first video. In addition to Thaissa as Colt, the second video features Lawrence Selleck as Spock. Prosthetics and digital technology were used to recreate the appearance of original actor Leonard Nimoy, who died in 2015. Both characters are shown at different stages of the Star Trek timeline using scans of real costumes plus some concepts and imagery from unfilmed projects. Visual effects company BLR VFX worked on the video. The archive team also showed test footage of their technology being used to recreate Star Trek: The Animated Series (1973–74) in live-action with visuals that are consistent with The Original Series.

=== Generations shorts and The Archive ===
Following the release of Picard's series finale in April 2023, the Roddenberry Archive's digital collection was made available through an online web portal for three weeks. It had more than four million visitors in that time. The site included full digital recreations of every Enterprise bridge. It also included a documentary about the history of the Enterprise bridges, narrated by John de Lancie who portrays Q in the franchise; a featurette that previews an hours-long interview with original Star Trek actor William Shatner, who played Captain James T. Kirk; a featurette about the USS Enterprise–D from Star Trek: The Next Generation (1987–1994) and its recreation for Picard, with The Next Generation director James L. Conway, director-producer David Livingston, program consultant David Gerrold, illustrator Andrew Probert, and production designer Herman Zimmerman, as well as Picard's showrunner Terry Matalas; and a third short in the concept video series, "765874 – Regeneration", which is connected to the film Star Trek Generations (1994). The short features original music by Johan Söderqvist. The archive team also announced that they had recreated the voice of Gene's wife Majel Barrett, who played different characters in the franchise including the voice of the Enterprise computer, based on phonetic recordings that she made before her death in 2008. Rod was pleased that the archive could continue his mother's legacy in addition to his father's, and fulfill her wish to continue voicing the Enterprise computer after her death.

The digital collection was again made available in February 2024 through the web portal as well as The Archive, a new mixed reality app for the Apple Vision Pro headset. The app was launched in conjunction with Paramount Game Studios. Rod described the immersive experience as "a remarkable milestone in realizing [Gene]'s vision for the holodeck". It was accompanied by new interviews featuring Gerrold and original Star Trek actor Walter Koenig, who played Pavel Chekov. An expansion of The Archive was announced in April, coinciding with the conclusion of Star Trek: Discovery (2017–2024). A new documentary exploring the creation of Star Trek: Deep Space Nine (1993–1999) and its titular space station was released, narrated by Deep Space Nine star Armin Shimerman who portrayed Quark in that series and other Star Trek media.

An expansion commemorating the 30th anniversary of Generations was launched in November 2024. This focused on a new concept video titled "765874 – Unification", which features Thaissa as Colt, Selleck as Spock, and Sam Witwer as James T. Kirk. Practical and digital prosthetics were used to recreate the appearance of a younger Kirk as portrayed by Shatner. Gary Lockwood and Robin Curtis reprised their respective Star Trek roles as Gary Mitchell and Saavik for the video, which was filmed with a combination of location photography, virtual production, and computer-generated set extensions. The project was executive produced by Shatner and Susan Bay Nimoy, the widow of Leonard Nimoy. Michael Giacchino returned from previous Star Trek media to compose original music for the video. Additional featurettes, including a retrospective interview with Shatner, were also released. Another expansion was launched in August 2025 ahead of Star Trek's 59th anniversary, with documentaries on the unproduced series Star Trek: Phase II, director Nicholas Meyer, and authors Judith and Garfield Reeves-Stevens.

== The Archive ==
Screenshot from The Archive of an Apple Vision Pro mixed reality user exploring the bridge of the USS Enterprise–D

The Archive is a mixed reality app featuring real-time, 3D, immersive "spatial experiences" in 4K resolution. The app was created using OTOY's rendering software and the open source framework Universal Scene Description (USD) specifically for the Vision Pro, which is described as a spatial computing platform. Artists using OTOY's tools are able to upload and share their own immersive creations through the app, while Apple's SharePlay function allows users to livestream their in-app experiences over FaceTime.

The app launched in February 2024 with nearly two hours of experiences available, covering hundreds of virtually recreated locations and items from throughout the history of the Star Trek franchise. These included Captain Kirk's quarters, Quark's Bar, and the hangar bay of the USS Enterprise–D. Some assets could be resized and placed in the user's home environment, including a model of the Enterprise. Portions of the app feature narration by the digitally recreated voice of Majel Barrett. In addition to digital assets and locations, the app launched with the Roddenberry Archive's previously released featurettes, documentaries, and short concept videos which were remastered for the Vision Pro. Newly restored archival footage was also featured, including excerpts from interviews with filmmaker George Lucas and comic book creator Stan Lee discussing Gene Roddenberry's influence on their work. The app also contains content from other OTOY archive collaborators such as filmmaker Bruce Timm for Batman: The Animated Series (1992–1995).

In April 2024, The Archive was expanded with several new spatial experiences, including the bridge of the USS Discovery from Star Trek: Discovery; the interior of the IKS Amar, the Klingon K't'inga class battlecruiser from The Motion Picture; and the promenade of the Deep Space 9 space station from Star Trek: Deep Space Nine. Several new starship models from different eras of the franchise were also added to the app. The expansion in November for the 30th anniversary of Star Trek Generations included recreations of sets, props, and locations from that film as well as new featurettes and the "765874 – Unification" concept video. Locations from the video were recreated digitally using scans and digital set extensions, while major scenes were filmed twice so they could be mastered for the Vision Pro. The August 2025 expansion was called "the largest update to The Archive to date". It included reproductions of seven new ships, twenty new explorable environments, eight new cinematics, and twenty-two new planet environments.

The Archive was listed as one of the top apps for new users of the Vision Pro to try by BGR, AppleInsider, and 9to5Mac. AppleInsider said even for non-Star Trek fans it was an "impressive technical demo" for the Vision Pro's capabilities. Following the April 2024 expansion, James Whitbrook at Gizmodo specifically discussed the recreation of the Deep Space 9 promenade. He was positive about it, especially with the accompanying virtual tour narrated by Armin Shimerman, but said an empty digital version was unable to capture what made the set so compelling in Deep Space Nine when it was filled with people from different Star Trek cultures.

== Interviews ==
The Roddenberry Archive has released featurettes and documentaries based on interviews with individuals connected to Star Trek. Urbach hoped to eventually interview every person with direct knowledge of the franchise.

Roddenberry Archive interviews
No.	Title	Guest(s)	Original release date
1	"The Gene Roddenberry Archive"	–	August 12, 2021
2	"The Cage"	Robert Butler and Sandra Lee Gimpel	May 4, 2022
3	"The Cage – Supplemental Log: Starring Jeffrey Hunter"	Christopher Hunter and Robert Butler	August 26, 2022
4	"The Cage – Supplemental Log: Casting The Cage"	Robert Butler	August 26, 2022
5	"The Cage – Supplemental Log: The Menagerie"	Christopher Hunter and Sean Kenney	August 26, 2022
6	"William Shatner: Reflections on the End of an Era"	William Shatner	April 27, 2023
7	"Creating the Next Generation"	Terry Matalas, James L. Conway, David Livingston, David Gerrold, Andrew Probert, and Herman Zimmerman	April 27, 2023
8	"Walter Koenig: Rejection and Redemption on the Final Frontier"	Walter Koenig	February 2, 2024
9	"In Conversation: David Gerrold – Part 1"	David Gerrold	February 2, 2024
10	"In Conversation: David Gerrold – Part 2"	David Gerrold	February 2, 2024
11	"In Conversation: William Shatner"	William Shatner	November 19, 2024
12	"Robin Curtis: Becoming Saavik"	Robin Curtis	November 19, 2024
13	"George Takei: Remembrance of Gene's Gift"	George Takei	November 19, 2024
14	"Lost Voyages: Phase II and the Rebirth of Star Trek"	Jon Povill, Judith Reeves-Stevens, and Garfield Reeves-Stevens	August 4, 2025
15	"In Conversation: Walter Koenig"	Walter Koenig	August 4, 2025
16	"Creating the Shatnerverse: The Further Adventures of James T. Kirk"	William Shatner, Judith Reeves-Stevens, and Garfield Reeves-Stevens	August 4, 2025
17	"The Director's Journey: Nicholas Meyer"	Nicholas Meyer	August 4, 2025

== Virtual tours ==
The Roddenberry Archive has released several virtual tour videos based on their efforts to digitally recreate and preserve elements of the Star Trek franchise.

Roddenberry Archive documentaries
No.	Title	Narrator	Original release date
1	"Evolution: The Enterprise Bridge"	John de Lancie	April 27, 2023
An exploration of the starship Enterprise's bridge, from its inception in 1964, through decades of television and films, to the latest incarnation on the Enterprise–G in the finale of Star Trek: Picard.
2	"Deep Space Nine: A Stroll Down the Promenade"	Armin Shimerman	April 5, 2024
A history of the creation of the series Star Trek: Deep Space Nine and a virtual tour of its titular space station, with an especial focus on Deep Space 9's famous promenade.
3	"Return to Tomorrow: Virtual Exploration of the World of Star Trek"	John de Lancie	July 30, 2024
An introduction to and exploration of the Roddenberry Archive's virtual recreations of starships, other locations, sets, props, and more from across the Star Trek franchise.

== 765874 shorts ==
Rod Roddenberry wanted the archive to highlight Star Trek's spin-off fiction that had not been visualized in live-action and was deemed to be outside of official Star Trek canon. Urbach said they wanted to take some stories he considered influential, along with unrealized projects, and elevate them by creating live-action versions. When approaching the first concept video, "765874", they looked to J. M. Colt's role in a 1998 comic book story published by Marvel Comics in Star Trek: Early Voyages. In the comic, Colt time travels to the future, and when she returns to her own time, she "sees all of Star Trek's timeline. It's this 'awakening' and seeing everything and having that experience." Urbach expanded on this, treating Colt as an "observer" who has seen different moments throughout Star Trek history. The video's title is a reference to Colt's in-universe Starfleet serial number.

The second video, "765874 – Memory Wall", builds on Gene Roddenberry's novelization of The Motion Picture (1979) which describes Spock's mind meld with the entity V'Ger as an "awakening", allowing him to be treated as another "observer". Urbach thought bringing together two characters who had seen "outside of the margins" aligned with Star Trek's theme of exploration, saying: "Not everything is necessarily a new alien. Some of it is like opening your mind." The video recreates imagery from the Early Voyages comic book as well as the 2015 comic book Star Trek: Captain's Log – Pike from IDW Publishing. The use of digital technology to recreate the likeness of Nimoy's Spock was discussed by Matthew S. Smith for IEEE Spectrum, who said the effect was convincing but raised questions about whether it was appropriate to use. He compared it to the digital recreation of Peter Cushing's Grand Moff Tarkin for the film Rogue One (2016), which received criticism at the time and "didn't sit well with some viewers". Urbach felt there was a difference with their usage of the technology because they were doing it for preservation rather than a commercial enterprise. Selleck said he took his role in the process very seriously and chose to avoid actions that could be seen as disrespectful to Nimoy even between takes.

The third short is set after the events of Star Trek Generations, which saw the Enterprise–D crash-land on the planet Veridian III where Captain James T. Kirk is later killed and buried. The third season of Picard (2023) reveals that Starfleet recovered the crashed ship and Kirk's remains sometime after the events of the film. "765874 – Regeneration" depicts Starfleet's efforts to recover the ship, and also shows Spock visiting Kirk's grave. The latter sequence visualizes imagery from Shatner's novel The Ashes of Eden (1995), the first in a series known as the Shatnerverse that imagines a resurrected Kirk's life after the events of Generations. The short was deemed to be a touching and fitting epilogue to the film by commentators. Urbach said the concept videos were not expected to "attract widespread attention from fans", but each received millions of views on YouTube.

"765874 – Unification" was the most complex short so far. The key motivations for the story were fan frustrations regarding Kirk's death in Generations and the off-screen death of Spock revealed in the film Star Trek Beyond (2016). Urbach wanted to give the characters a "proper sendoff" that would also bring closure for fans. The video connects to more spin-off material with the character Gary Mitchell from "Where No Man Has Gone Before" (1966), the second pilot episode for The Original Series. Despite Mitchell seemingly dying in that episode, he is shown to have survived in the "A Perfect System" comic book story from IDW's Star Trek #400 (2022), and the short recreates imagery from that comic. "Unification" was met with "huge, viral appreciation" from Star Trek fans, and positive responses from critics despite mixed thoughts on the success of the digital recreations. The short led to further discussion of the technology's use. Based on online comments from fans, Urbach believed they had succeeded in creating a meaningful reunion for Kirk and Spock. He said this was the culmination of the characters' stories and the creative team did not intend to continue them. They were open to telling more stories, including filling in details about what leads up to Kirk and Spock's reunion.

Roddenberry Archive shorts
No.	Title	Directed by	Written by	Original release date
1	"765874"	Carlos Baena	Jules Urbach	May 3, 2022
J. M. Colt sees flashes of light and then images of several locations around San Francisco, including shuttlecraft flying near the Golden Gate Bridge and the USS Enterprise docked beside a building. Cast: Mahé Thaissa as J. M. Colt
2	"765874 – Memory Wall"	Carlos Baena and Jules Urbach	Jules Urbach	August 26, 2022
Spock does a mind meld with Colt, accessing her memories. He sees her on a high rock pillar looking at an eye-shaped pool inside a circle of stones, and also sees a starship crashed in an arctic landscape. Colt probes back, seeing quick flashes of the Enterprise crashing, the planet Jupiter, the Voyager 6 space probe, an injured Captain Christopher Pike, and other moments from Spock's life. Spock's voice says "remember". Cast: Lawrence Selleck as Spock and Mahé Thaissa as J. M. Colt
3	"765874 – Regeneration"	Carlos Baena	Jules Urbach	April 27, 2023
Starfleet recovers the crashed saucer portion of the USS Enterprise–D from the planet Veridian III. Elsewhere on the planet, Spock approaches the grave of his friend James T. Kirk and retrieves the latter's Starfleet badge. Cast: Lawrence Selleck as Spock
4	"765874 – Unification"	Carlos Baena	Jules Urbach	November 18, 2024
Kirk walks through a garden and sees a group of people standing by a fountain, including Saavik and her son Sorak. At the fountain is Starfleet officer Yor, who gives Kirk the Starfleet badge that Spock recovered. Kirk is then in a passageway where he sees earlier versions of himself. This leads him to a room where an elderly, dying Spock lies in a bed. Kirk takes Spock's hand and they share a look before watching the sunset together. Cast: William Shatner and Sam Witwer as James T. Kirk, Lawrence Selleck as Spock, Robin Curtis as Saavik, and Gary Lockwood as Gary Mitchell
