= Women in Animation =

American non-profit organization

- Abbreviation: WIA
- Founded: 1995; 25 years ago
- Founder: Rita Street and Phyllis Craig
- Legal status: Non-profit
- President: Margaret Dean
- Website: womeninanimation.org

WIA (originally Women in Animation) is a non-profit organization with the purpose of furthering, promoting, and supporting female animators in the art, science and business of animation. WIA helps young female artists to find a place in the business world. WIA has chapters in San Francisco, New York City, Dublin, Pune, and Toronto. WIA states that the lack of an equal number of women and men in the animation profession is because "there has been very little work to intentionally change the status quo." In order to help women assess the animation profession, WIA has created a mentorship program, a voice over group, a scholarship, talks, and events. The organization is currently led by its president, Margaret Dean.

== History ==
WIA was founded in 1995 by producer and journalist Rita Street and animator Phyllis Craig. Craig had worked in several animation studios like Disney, Hanna-Barbera and Marvel, taking numerous roles as a painter, inker, and color key artist. She spoke about having difficulty becoming an animator in Disney, due to the common belief that only men can be animators, and women be strictly painters and inkers. After Craig's death on May 18, 1997, WIA created a scholarship called "The Phyllis Craig Scholarship Fund". Margaret Dean and Kristy Scanlan took over as co-presidents of WIA in 2013, increasing the membership from 120 to 800 active members in January 2015. Currently, Dean is the president of WIA. WIA has since created more programs, one called "50/50 by 2025", a pledge people can sign to show support for closing the job gap for women in the animation industry. Another pledge, called the "Animation Studio Anti-Harassment Pledge" (ASAP), advocates for safer and nondiscriminatory workplaces for women animators. WIA also holds yearly mentorship programs, where mentees can apply to learn from animators experienced in the industry.

== Gender Disparity in the Animation Industry ==
Although female animators have come a long way from the time when Disney sent out rejection letters stating, "Women do not do any of the creative work in connection with preparing the cartoons for the screen, as that work is performed entirely by young men", the climate shift within the animation industry is progressing very slowly. During the 1930s, women were only employed as inkers and painters at Disney. They were discouraged from being animators and were not permitted inside the animation building unless it concerned business. It was not until 1941, with the outbreak of war, that Disney started training women in animation to maintain a pool of workers while the men had gone to war. Today, according to Los Angeles Magazine, 70% of animation students from CalArts Valencia campus, 66% of animation students from UCLA, and 55% of animation students from USC are female. Despite the rapidly growing female population studying animation, industry statistics still reflect poorly from achieving gender parity. The Animation Guild, I.A.T.S.E. Local 839, is a union representing over 4,000 animation artists, writers, and technicians in Los Angeles. Based on its data, in 2015, 20.6% of Guild workers were women. The number increased to 23.2% in 2016, and finally hit the quarter milestone of 25.6% in 2018. While there appears to be a rising number of female professionals in the industry, a closer look into 2015 statistics in key areas of animation shows only 1% of women were art directors, 3% were directors, and 5% were writers. As of 2019, the number of female executives in animation has risen to more than half, and 39% in TV. However, female directors make up 3% for animated films, while women of color make up to only 1%.

== Events ==
WIA has hosted over 100 events. Examples of some of the events hosted by WIA include: "WIA Conversations" (Tara Strong gave this talk on November 19, 2015), "Voices in the Room", "The WIA Mentorship Experience", as well as many other kinds of events and talks. WIA also has hosted movie screenings, panels, workshops, and "Monthly Networking Mixers".

In 2014, WIA kicked off its first mentoring program, which was open to members of WIA in the Los Angeles area. The mentoring program has continued into the present. The program is intended to help mentees have greater "industry knowledge and access to information through relationships with experienced professionals.

WIA hosts various activities and efforts aimed at raising awareness of women in the animation industry. In 2015, WIA hosted a panel on women in animation, presenting such statistics as while 60% of students studying animation in several Los Angeles animation schools are women, only 20% of working animators are content creators, rather than support staff.

On November 22, 2015, WIA had a booth and a talk at the CTN Animation Expo. People interested in WIA signed their names on a huge poster featuring their logo behind their booth. Floyd Norman also showed his support for WIA by signing his name on the poster. The subject of the discussion of the talk at CTN was "50/50 by 2025" (#5050by2025) which discussed the subject of getting the ratio of female to male animators working in the industry to 50% (equal) by the year 2025. Another goal of 50/50 by 2025 is to "bring about more varied and positive representations on screen."

== Scholarships ==
Phyllis Craig's death inspired the creation of an annual $1,000 scholarship fund called "The Phyllis Craig Scholarship Fund" (PCSF) in her honor, the deadline being April 29, Craig's birthday. WIA has also created an annual "Women in Animation Scholarship Program" to financially support students pursuing animation. Out of 83 applicants from 44 schools, the scholarship was given to eight students. The 2020 scholarship pool totaled $15,000, while also providing a program reward from Animation Mentor and Toon Boom.
