= 765874 – Unification =

2024 short concept video

- 765874 episode
- Episode no.: Episode 4
- Directed by: Carlos Baena
- Story by: Jules Urbach
- Cinematography by: Leonidas Jaramillo
- Editing by: Carlos Baena
- Original release date: November 18, 2024
- Running time: 11 minutes

Cast
- William Shatner and Sam Witwer as James T. Kirk; Lawrence Selleck as Spock; Robin Curtis as Saavik; Gary Lockwood as Gary Mitchell; Mahé Thaissa as J. M. Colt; Gordon Tarpley as Yor; John Daltorio as Crusher; Mark Chinnery as Sorak

Episode chronology
← Previous "765874 – Regeneration"	Next → —

"765874 – Unification" is the fourth in a series of short concept videos that use digital technology to visualize past actors and previously unfilmed imagery from the Star Trek franchise. Created by the Roddenberry Archive, a collaboration between the estate of Star Trek creator Gene Roddenberry and computer graphics company OTOY, the video features a reunion between the characters James T. Kirk and Spock after the events of the film Star Trek Generations (1994). It was directed by Carlos Baena from a story by Jules Urbach.

Urbach conceived of the short by mid-2023. It has no dialogue and is open to interpretation regarding whether the events are actually happening to Kirk, are in Spock's mind, or are taking place in a version of the afterlife. Location filming took place at Huntington Botanical Gardens in San Marino, California, in 2024. Sam Witwer was cast as Kirk while Lawrence Selleck returned from the previous videos in the series as Spock; practical and digital prosthetics were used to recreate the likenesses of original actors William Shatner and Leonard Nimoy, respectively. Shatner was an executive producer on the video alongside Nimoy's widow, Susan Bay Nimoy. Robin Curtis and Gary Lockwood reprised their respective Star Trek roles as Saavik and Gary Mitchell. Several crew members returned from previous Star Trek projects, including production designer Dave Blass and composer Michael Giacchino.

The video was released on YouTube and the Apple Vision Pro app The Archive on November 18, 2024, the 30th anniversary of Generations. It has received more than 20 million views and was praised by fans and commentators. The latter discussed the digital recreation technology and whether the video is part of official Star Trek canon.

== Plot ==
Gary Mitchell, after acquiring godlike abilities in Star Trek: The Original Series (1966–1969), floats in space in front of a star. He closes his eyes and there are several images: Spock standing over the grave of James T. Kirk on the planet Veridian III from the film Star Trek Generations (1994); a futuristic cityscape; Spock doing a mind meld with J. M. Colt from the Original Series pilot episode "The Cage" (1964); Colt on a high rock pillar looking at an eye-shaped pool inside a circle of stones; the crashed saucer portion of the USS Enterprise–D being recovered from Veridian III by Starfleet; and a different version of Colt from the alternate Kelvin Timeline reviewing a file on Kirk's death in the Prime Timeline.

Kirk walks through a garden and sees a group of people standing by a fountain. He recognizes one of the people, Saavik, and realizes that the man standing beside her is her son with Spock. At the fountain is Starfleet officer Yor from the Kelvin Timeline, who gives Kirk the Starfleet badge which Spock had recovered from Kirk's grave on Veridian III. Kirk then finds himself in a distorted passageway where he sees versions of himself from earlier in his life. After they fade away, Kirk follows the passage. He enters a room on the planet New Vulcan in the Kelvin Timeline where an elderly Spock lies on his deathbed. Kirk takes Spock's hand and they share a look before silently watching the sunset together.

== Production ==
=== Background ===
The Roddenberry Archive, a collaboration between the estate of Star Trek creator Gene Roddenberry and computer graphics company OTOY, was announced in August 2021 by Gene's son Rod Roddenberry and OTOY founder and CEO Jules Urbach. In early 2022, the archive team interviewed several individuals involved with "The Cage" (1964), the first pilot episode for Star Trek: The Original Series (1966–1969). Laurel Goodwin, who played J. M. Colt in "The Cage", was expected to be interviewed for the project but died earlier that week. After noticing a resemblance between Urbach's wife Mahé Thaissa and Goodwin's portrayal of Colt, the archive team had planned to accompany Goodwin's interview with new footage of Thaissa as Colt on digital recreations of the episode's sets, filmed using virtual production techniques. Carlos Baena, who joined OTOY as a freelance director in early 2022, directed a short concept video featuring Thaissa as Colt that was released in May under the title "765874", a reference to Colt's in-universe Starfleet serial number. Rod wanted the archive to highlight Star Trek's spin-off fiction that had not been visualized in live-action, and the team looked to a 1998 comic book story published by Marvel Comics in Star Trek: Early Voyages as inspiration. In the comic, Colt time travels to the future and when she returns to her own time she has an "awakening" when she sees "all of Star Trek's timeline". Urbach expanded on this, treating Colt as an "observer" who has seen different moments throughout Star Trek history.

A second short concept video, "765874 – Memory Wall", was released in August 2022. In addition to Thaissa as Colt, it features Lawrence Selleck as Spock. Prosthetics and digital technology were used to recreate the appearance of original actor Leonard Nimoy, who died in 2015. The video builds on Gene Roddenberry's novelization of Star Trek: The Motion Picture (1979) which describes Spock's mind meld with the entity V'Ger as an "awakening", allowing him to be treated as another "observer". It recreates imagery from the Early Voyages comic book as well as the 2015 comic book Star Trek: Captain's Log – Pike from IDW Publishing. A third short, "765874 – Regeneration", was released in April 2023. It is set after the events of the film Star Trek Generations (1994), in which the USS Enterprise–D crash-lands on the planet Veridian III, where James T. Kirk is later killed and buried. The third season of Star Trek: Picard (2023) reveals that Starfleet recovered the crashed ship and Kirk's remains sometime after the events of the film. The video depicts Starfleet's efforts to recover the ship, and also shows Spock visiting Kirk's grave. The latter sequence visualizes imagery from Kirk star William Shatner's novel The Ashes of Eden (1995), the first in a series known as the Shatnerverse that imagines a resurrected Kirk's life after the events of Generations. In February 2024, the archive team's digital collection of Star Trek sets, props, locations, and concept videos was made available as The Archive, a new mixed reality app for the Apple Vision Pro.

=== Development and story ===
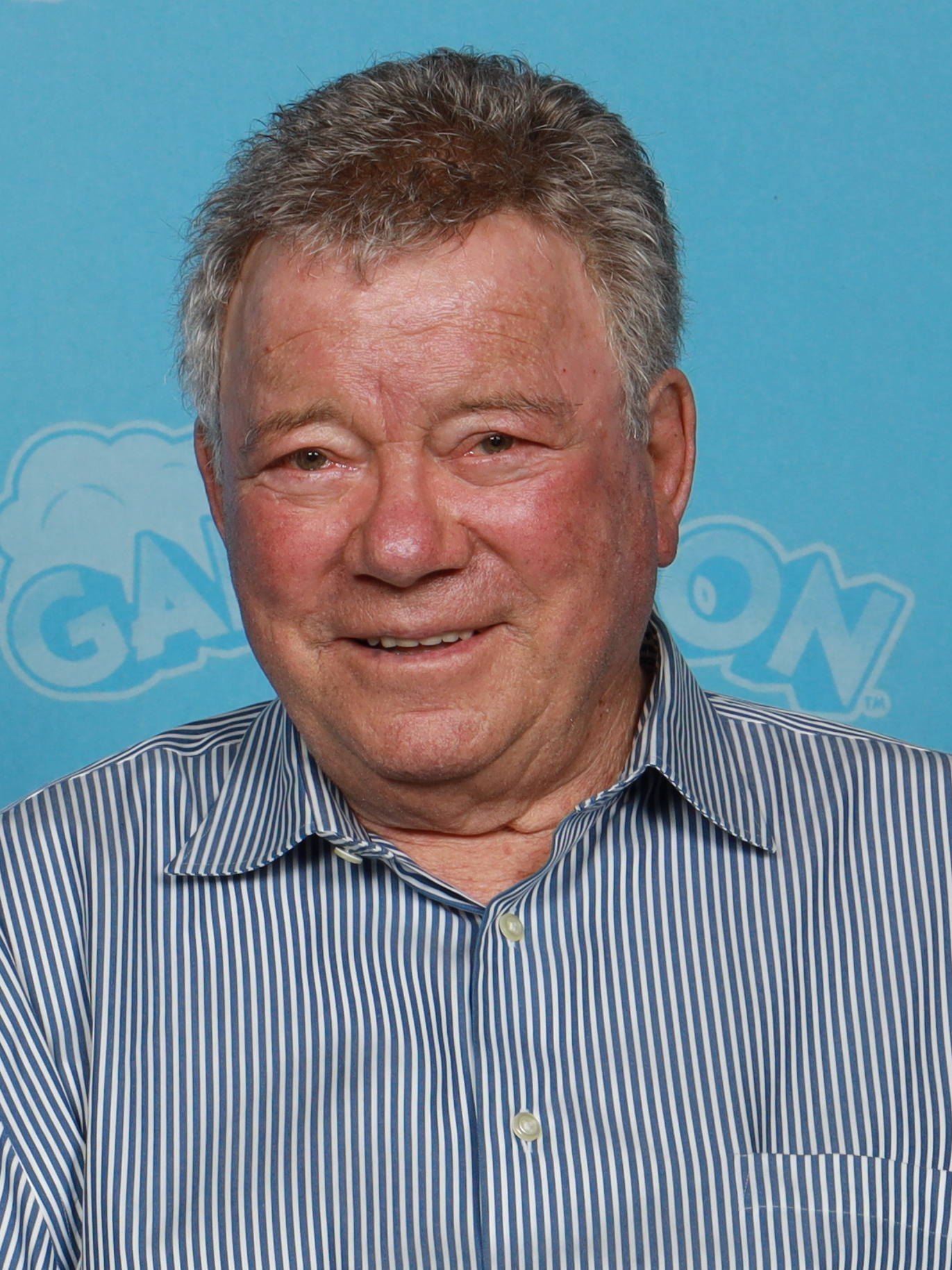
Original Star Trek actor William Shatner was an executive producer and consultant on the video.

In mid-2023, months after completing "Regeneration", Urbach shared his idea for a fourth concept video with Baena. He was inspired by comments Shatner made in an interview with the archive team, as well as fan frustrations regarding Kirk's death in Generations and the off-screen death of Spock in the alternate Kelvin Timeline, as revealed in the film Star Trek Beyond (2016). Urbach thought it was horrible that the two characters died in separate universes and wanted to give them a "proper sendoff" that would also bring closure for fans. After the team considered whether they should "dare" make such a project, they received approval from Shatner, Nimoy's family, and Star Trek parent company Paramount Global. The video was executive produced by Shatner and Susan Bay Nimoy, the widow of Leonard Nimoy. Shatner gave his approval after enjoying the archive team's previous work. He told them that they should only make the short if it was going to be "something meaningful". The title, "765874 – Unification", refers to Kirk and Spock's reunion but also the creative team's attempt to unify different parts of the Star Trek franchise.

The creators wanted the video to end with the reunion between Kirk and Spock. The rest of the narrative developed through discussions between Urbach and Baena, including during a February 2024 location scouting trip to Huntington Botanical Gardens in San Marino, California. Baena created a bullet-point list and a mood board to guide the story, which was refined with storyboard artist Ahmed Nasri, previsualization artist Jonathan Roybal, and visual effects artist J. J. Palomo. There was no script, but Baena wrote script pages for some scenes to convey the subtext that he wanted. They went through several months of editing to refine the story before production began. Urbach had various Star Trek references and characters that he wanted to include, but some of these were cut during editing for simplicity and focus. The video has no dialogue and is designed to be open to interpretation. Urbach offered three possible explanations for what happens: Kirk is resurrected following the events of Picard's third season and physically travels to the Kelvin Timeline to reunite with Spock before the latter's death; Spock is imagining a reunion with Kirk while on his deathbed; or the two characters are reuniting in a version of the afterlife. Urbach said they were "meticulous" in ensuring that they did not contradict one of these options.

The video begins with a prologue featuring the character Gary Mitchell from "Where No Man Has Gone Before" (1966), the second pilot episode for The Original Series. Despite Mitchell seemingly dying in that episode, spin-off fiction had shown him surviving with his newly acquired godlike abilities. Urbach particularly drew on the "A Perfect System" comic book story from IDW's Star Trek #400 (2022). He said Mitchell is "playing god and learning about humanity's future... he has seen enough to pass along information" that sets the story into motion. The prologue continues with clips from the previous videos, recapping the story so far, and then shows Colt reviewing files on Kirk's death and remains. Urbach said this is the version of Colt from the Kelvin Timeline rather than the Prime Timeline version seen in the previous videos, and she is able to review files on Kirk's death in the Prime Timeline because of Mitchell. He said this version of Colt would have interacted with Spock before his death, which "explains possibly more than anything".

The main story starts with Kirk, in a garden, appearing as he did in Generations. Urbach confirmed that this unspecified setting is not the extra-dimensional "Nexus" realm from Generations. He originally envisioned the sequence taking place on a cliff or bluff and wanted to film at Mackinac Island, Michigan, but this proved impractical and Baena suggested the garden setting based on the film Big Fish (2003). Kirk meets Yor, a character mentioned in the series Star Trek: Discovery (2017–2024) who is the only known being to have travelled from the Kelvin Timeline to the Prime Timeline. Yor presents Kirk with his own Starfleet badge, which Spock recovered in the previous video, indicating that Spock took the badge with him to the Kelvin Timeline and gave it to Yor as a message for Kirk. Urbach compared this moment to Orpheus entering the underworld in Greek mythology, with Yor taking on the role of Charon the ferryman. Kirk is transported to the planet New Vulcan in the Kelvin Timeline. New Vulcan was previously only depicted in the IDW comic book Legacy of Spock (2016), written by Mike Johnson who consulted on the video. Urbach said Spock is not expecting to see Kirk but is hoping that he will. The video ends with the pair watching the sunset together. Urbach said it was important to "see them together in a meaningful way. And that is where the piece really ends... They are together and that is a beautiful thing." He said this was the culmination of the characters' stories and he did not intend to continue beyond this point in future videos.

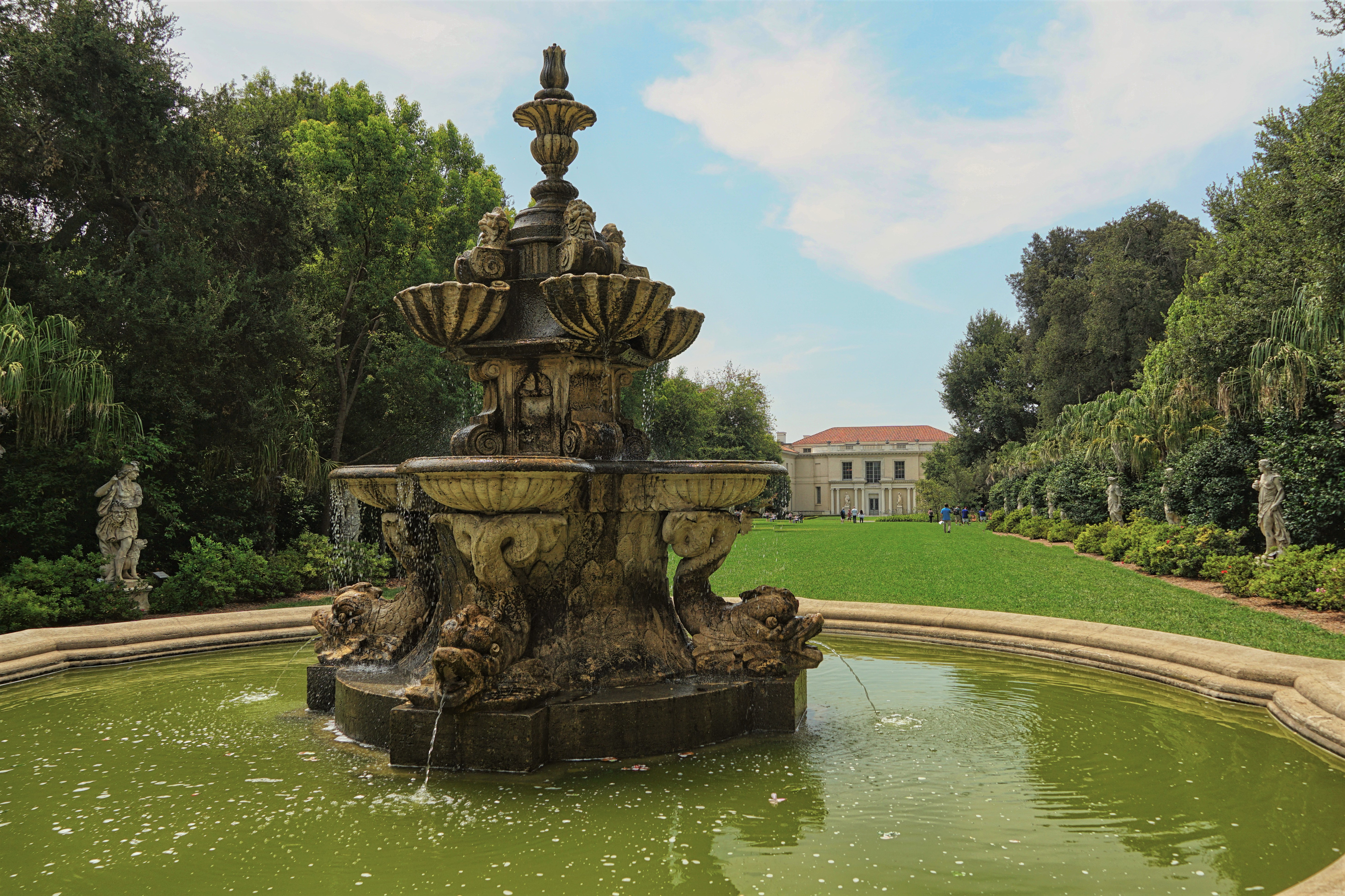
A fountain in Huntington Botanical Gardens in San Marino, California, where location filming took place

After settling on the filming locations for the garden sequence in Huntington Gardens, Baena felt the space was too big for just Kirk and Yor. He suggested that a group of characters with significance to Kirk should also be present, taking inspiration from when he visited his dying father in hospital and was met with "a hallway full of loved ones already there". The characters in the garden were chosen to avoid giving away whether they are actually there or if Kirk is in the afterlife. Urbach said Kirk seeing his friends from the past such as Leonard McCoy would mean he is in the afterlife, but seeing characters from the future does not preclude him from being in the afterlife due to people being able to appear at any age. This interpretation of the afterlife was inspired by the 1978 novel What Dreams May Come written by Richard Matheson, who also wrote the Original Series episode "The Enemy Within" (1966). Future characters seen in the garden include an unidentified descendant of Beverly Crusher from the series Star Trek: The Next Generation (1987–1994), an older version of Saavik from the Star Trek films, and a Vulcan man who is implied to be the son of Saavik and Spock. Urbach confirmed this, explaining that Saavik was originally revealed to be pregnant with Spock's child in an early script for the film Star Trek IV: The Voyage Home (1986), and Nimoy's family believed it was his intention for the characters to have a child together. Urbach also pointed to the novel Vulcan's Heart (1999) by Josepha Sherman and Susan Shwartz in which Spock and Saavik get married. He chose the name Sorak for their son as a name that "you could imagine as Spock's son". It was important for Urbach to include Spock's family in this moment, believing they should be at a ceremony that sends someone to see Spock.

=== Filming and post-production ===
The video was directed by Baena in early 2024. He felt dialogue would take away from "the power of visual storytelling" and wanted to create a "visual poem" that worked for anyone regardless of what language they spoke. Baena's background in animation helped with this approach. He said the short explores themes of connection and "what it truly means to be human—including themes of mortality and goodbyes. That's why I wanted to leave space for viewers to bring their own interpretations, shaped by their personal journeys and perspectives." Baena was influenced by key moments in his personal life from the five years leading up to production: being with his father when the latter died, not being with his mother when she died, and becoming a father himself. Baena used animatics created during previsualization as the basis for discussions about filming each shot with the heads of production, such as cinematographer Leonidas Jaramillo who also worked on Picard and the television film Star Trek: Section 31 (2025). The previous videos were managed through Zoom, but the increase in scope and complexity for "Unification" required a new workflow to handle dailies and feedback. The production used the SyncSketch tool developed by Baena's former Pixar colleague Bernhard Haux. Major scenes were captured in two ways: they were filmed in a video format for the short, while the archive team also captured them in a "spatial experience" format that was mastered for The Archive. The crew expected to film in Huntington Gardens for one day, but it was raining which did not match their hopes for sunny weather. Baena asked to shoot the scenes again on a different day, and Urbach agreed despite the cost.

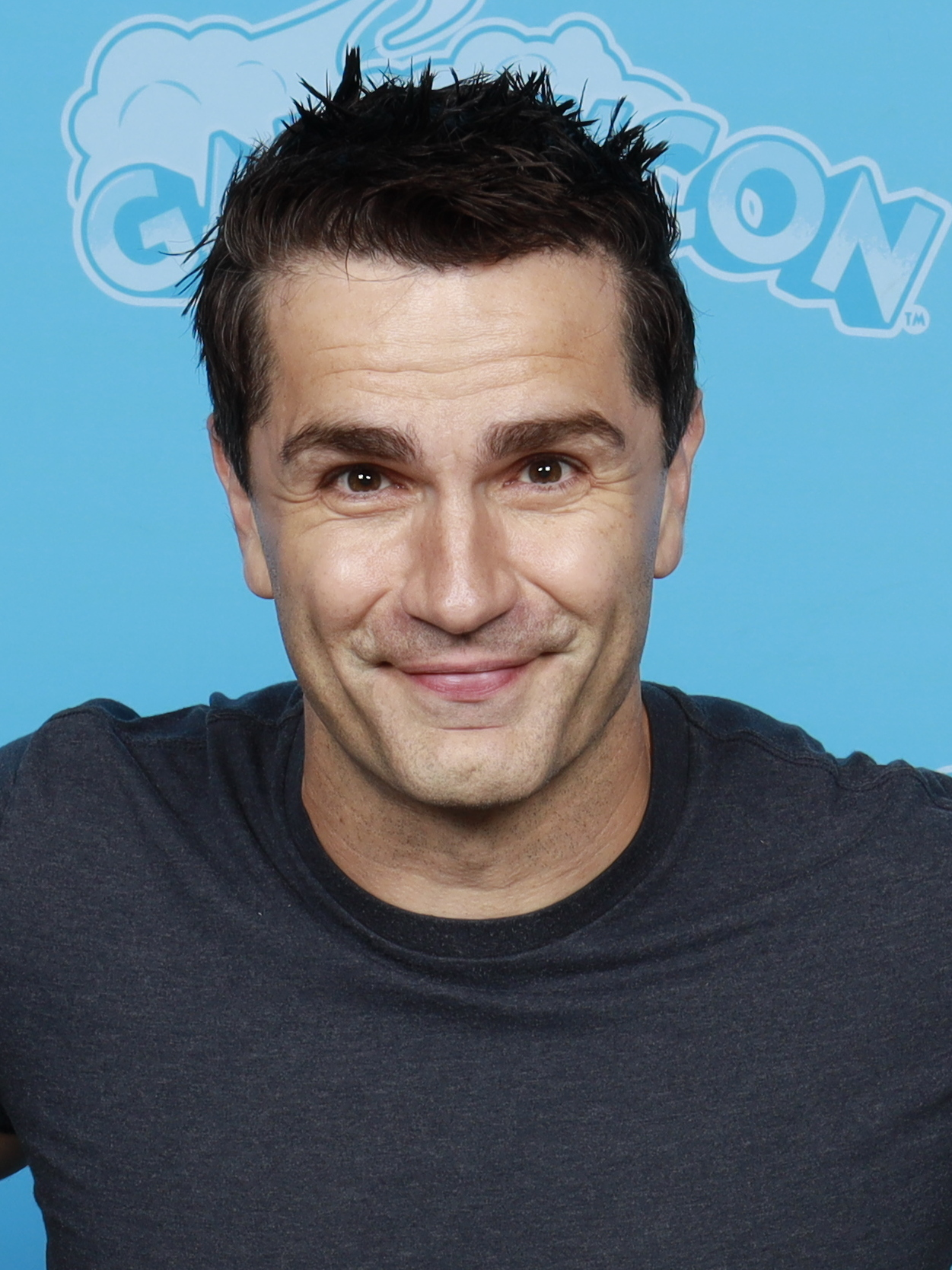
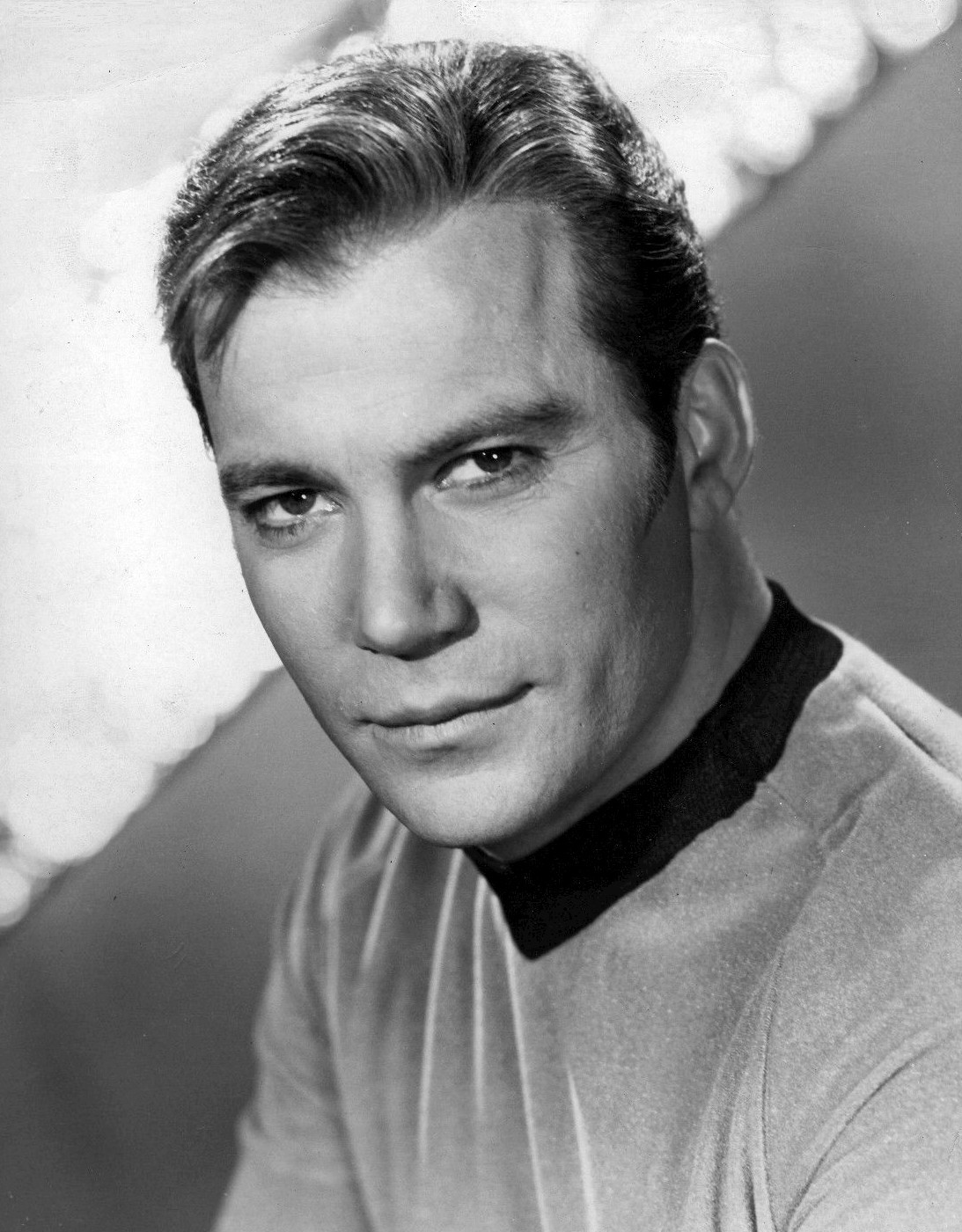
Sam Witwer (left) stars in the video as James T. Kirk. Practical and digital prosthetics were used to recreate the appearance of William Shatner's version of the character from earlier Star Trek projects, including his appearance in Star Trek: The Original Series (right).

Returning from the previous videos were Thaissa as Colt and Selleck as Spock, with practical and digital prosthetics again used to recreate the likeness of Nimoy for Spock. Sam Witwer was cast as Kirk and the same technology was used to recreate Shatner's likeness from earlier Star Trek productions. Witwer, who had previous experience with similar technology on another project, contacted Urbach in late 2022 to ask how the recreation of Spock for the "Memory Wall" video was achieved. Coincidentally, the archive team already planned to speak to Witwer about him joining them to work on a potential recreation of Shatner's Kirk. Witwer and visual effects producer Clay Sparks led a research and development team dedicated to the project, working for more than a year on the technology and performance elements before they presented their progress to Shatner. Their tests included recreating Kirk's scenes from earlier Star Trek projects and also shooting new scenes written by former Star Trek writer and producer Ronald D. Moore.

Discussing the digital prosthetics process, Urbach explained that the actors' faces are replaced but their underlying facial performances are kept. Witwer described it as a digital mask that covers the actors' faces and picks up even the most subtle movements. The actors had to learn how to move their faces to create a performance that looks correct for the digital face instead of their own. The number of face replacement shots expanded from three in "Regeneration" to more than thirty in "Unification". Baena said his focus was on avoiding the uncanny valley with the digital faces. He felt the effect was convincing because they were combining the digital enhancements with practical prosthetics, specific lighting, and casting decisions, rather than just "swapping out faces". The actors were chosen because of their physical resemblance to the original stars, particularly in head and face shape. Shatner consulted on the digital recreation of Kirk throughout production. The team were able to see the recreations on a monitor during filming, allowing Baena to direct the performances based on the final effect. Urbach said the performance for Kirk was "90-something percent Sam Witwer". He told Witwer that whatever is happening to Kirk, "his presence in this space has not been for very long" and so he should start the video perplexed and then become more confident. Urbach said the technology was not preventing the actors from speaking, reiterating that it was an artistic decision to have no dialogue and the voices could have been recreated if they wanted to. The digital prosthetics process uses machine learning, but Urbach pushed back on the term artificial intelligence (AI). He said it was still a creative process that required a team of artists, rather than "a magic button that does everything for us", and was much higher quality than the similar deepfake technology. Urbach compared it to the performance capture technology used for the Avatar films, though it had improved to no longer need tracking markers on the actors' faces and to be available in real-time on set.

Also appearing in the video are Robin Curtis as Saavik, Gordon Tarpley as Yor, John Daltorio as Crusher, and Mark Chinnery as Sorak. Curtis reprised her role from the films Star Trek III: The Search for Spock (1984) and Star Trek IV: The Voyage Home. She had hoped for her character to be explored more, especially with the tease in The Voyage Home that Saavik could be pregnant with Spock's child, but accepted when the franchise went in a different direction. Curtis said the opportunity to return to the role for this video was "life-altering" and unexpectedly emotional for her. Practical prosthetics were used to age the actress to depict an older Saavik.

Urbach credited Baena for the visuals of the "otherworldly tunnel" which transports Kirk to Spock. The pair were inspired by the film 2001: A Space Odyssey (1968). Urbach said it was a "world between worlds" and noted that the sequence is more abstract than others in the video. The original plan was for Kirk to just see one younger version of himself in the tunnel, potentially how he appeared in The Original Series, but this was extended to two younger versions—including how he appeared in the film Star Trek II: The Wrath of Khan (1982)—because of the 2001: A Space Odyssey influence. Witwer portrayed all three versions of Kirk wearing different costumes and hair. He was filmed on a green screen so the different versions could be put together in post-production. A line of voice-over was added late in production when the creators felt they "needed something here". It is dialogue that Kirk speaks in The Wrath of Khan: "There are always possibilities, Spock said. And if Genesis is indeed life from death... I must return to this place, again." This references Spock's original death in that film, which Urbach felt was an important connection to draw and a moment that Kirk would think back on during this experience. The creative team initially recorded Witwer speaking the line and planned to use technology to change his performance to sound like Shatner's voice, but Shatner gave them permission to use his own voice and Paramount provided the actual audio recording from the film. Urbach thought it was fitting to have an element come directly from Shatner.

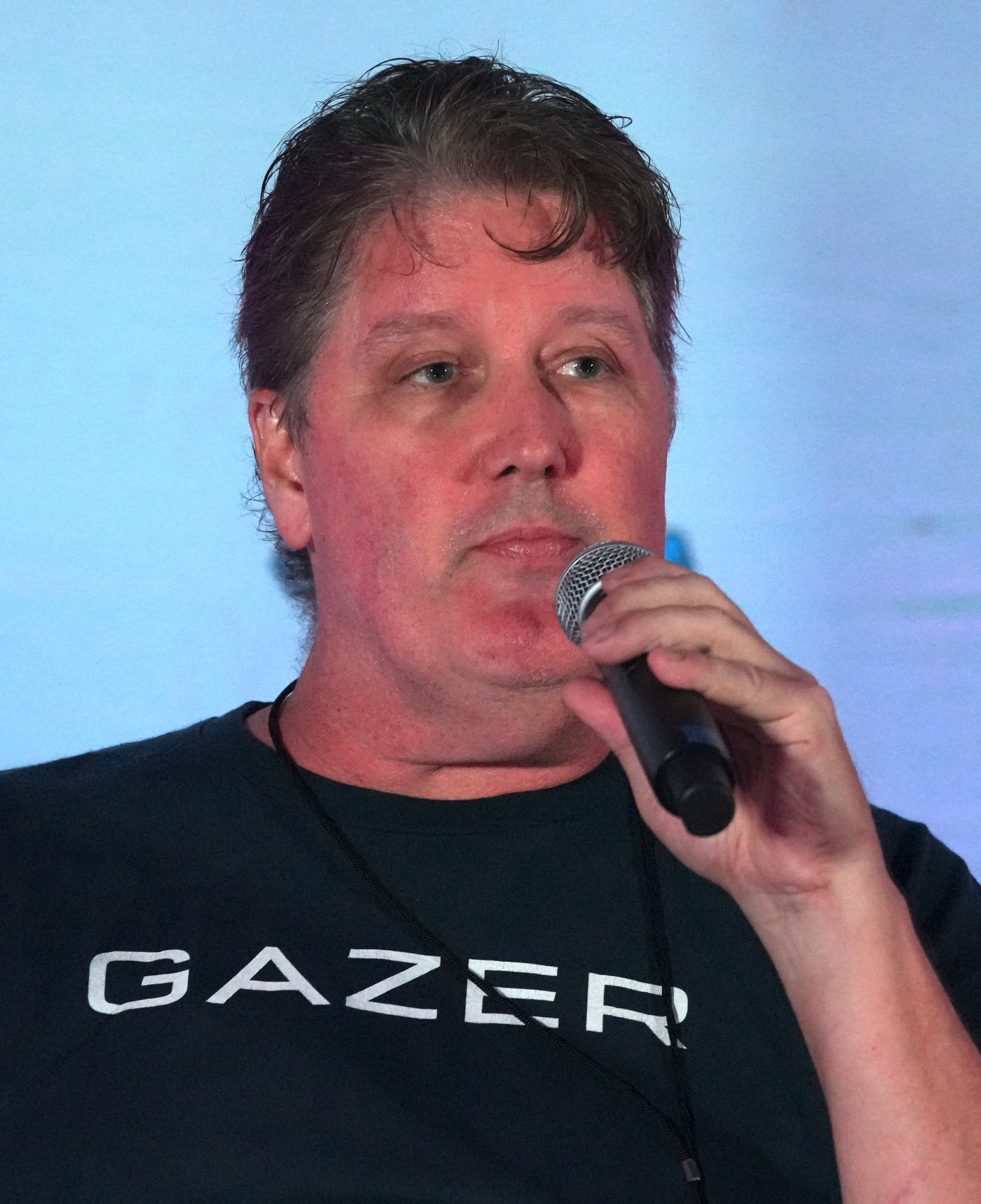
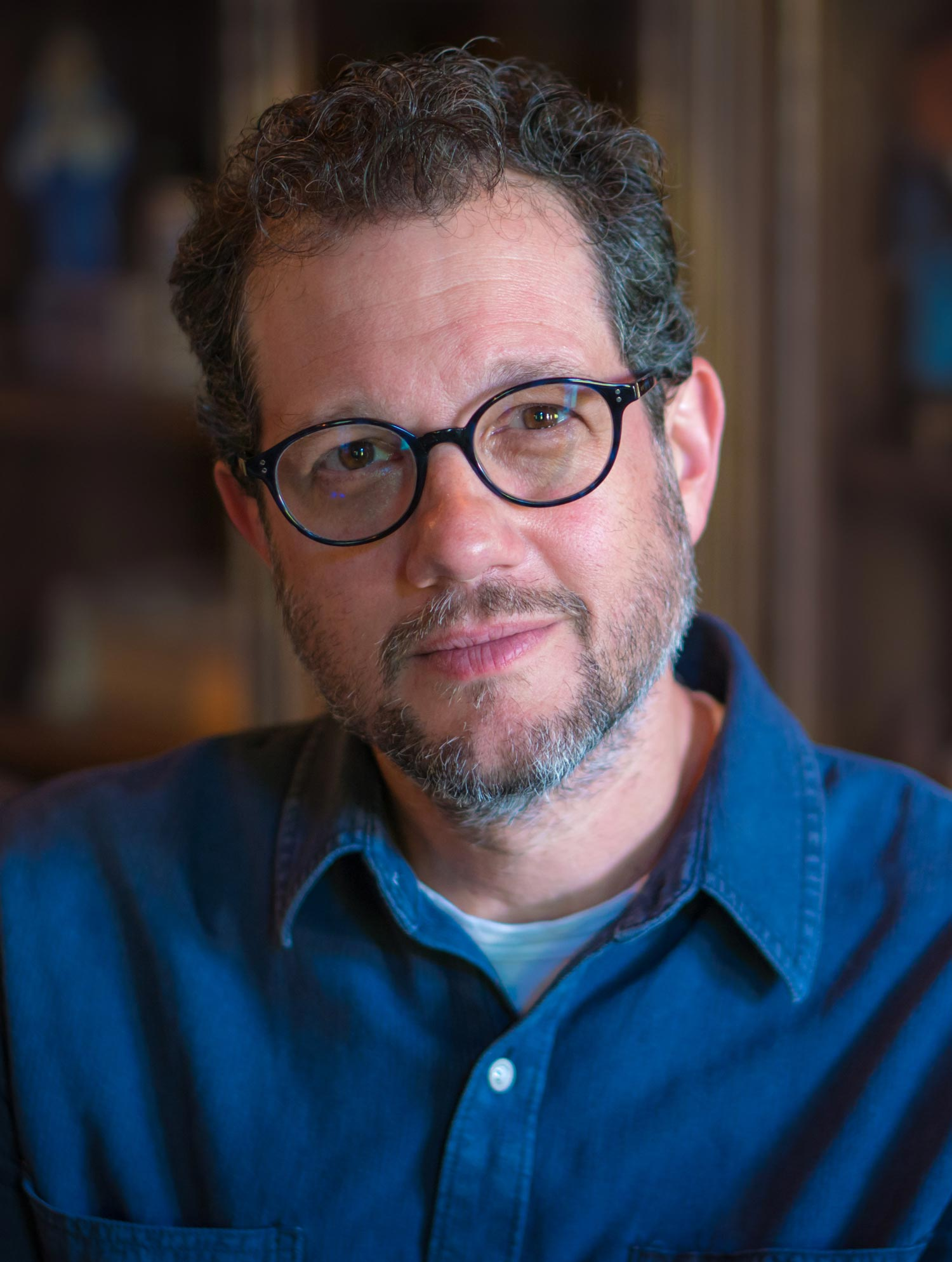
Crew members returning from previous Star Trek projects to contribute to the video include Star Trek: Picard production designer Dave Blass (left) and franchise composer Michael Giacchino (right).

Picard production designer Dave Blass designed the set for Spock's room on New Vulcan, with a video wall displaying the sunset. Veteran Star Trek production artists Mike and Denise Okuda helped decorate the set with Easter eggs. The first thing the team created was a replica of the box that is presented to the Kelvin Timeline version of Spock, portrayed by Zachary Quinto, in Star Trek Beyond after the off-screen death of Nimoy's Spock. Urbach felt this was key to inform viewers that the scene is set in the Kelvin Timeline close to the events of Beyond. He said Kirk does not care about the box and other things in the room because "he just knows that Spock is there and dying". The two characters clasp hands in a reference to the film Star Trek: The Motion Picture (1979), as Urbach felt the moment in that film where the two characters clasp hands is key to their friendship. He originally intended to end the video with the hand clasp, but Baena felt this was ending too early and extended the scene to show the pair looking at the sunset together.

OTOY and other visual effects companies combined location photography, virtual production, and computer-generated set extensions. Visual effects were used to create a "cinematic" version of Gary Mitchell's appearances in The Original Series and the "A Perfect System" comic book story, based on a performance by original actor Gary Lockwood. The initial plan was to not show the character's face, but this changed during the editorial process. Witwer brought on his friend David W. Collins to do the sound design with Skywalker Sound. Baena imagined using music by Star Trek franchise composer Michael Giacchino, having been inspired by Giacchino since they both worked at Pixar, but was unsure if he would be interested; Giacchino's music from previous projects was used as a temp track for the video. Collins approached Giacchino while they were working together on the series Star Wars: Skeleton Crew (2024–25), and the composer agreed to join after seeing test footage of Witwer as Kirk. His score, which incorporates the original Star Trek theme by Alexander Courage, was completed quickly to fit into his schedule. Baena said they were happy with the music after two passes. Giacchino connected Urbach to Marvel Studios president and noted Star Trek fan Kevin Feige, who consulted on the video before its release. Feige and illustrator Alex Ross, who previously worked with OTOY and the Roddenberry Archive, both received special thanks in the credits. The video opens with a quote by Kirk from The Wrath of Khan: "How we deal with death is at least as important as how we deal with life". It ends with a dedication to Leonard Nimoy.

== Release ==
OTOY released a teaser trailer for "765874 – Unification" in November 2024 which revealed the video's release date, 30 years after the premiere of Star Trek Generations on November 18, 1994. Shatner made a surprise appearance at the Star Trek: Original Series Set Tour in Ticonderoga, New York, on November 17, 2024, for a private screening with fans before it was released the next day, as an unlisted video on YouTube.

== Reception ==
The video was viewed more than a million times within a week of its release, and reached 20 million views by the end of January 2025. Blass said it was "insane" for an unlisted video on YouTube to reach that many views. As of January 10, 2026, the short has 38 million views on YouTube. James Whitbrook at Gizmodo said the video was met with "huge, viral appreciation" and responses to the digital recreations from Star Trek fans were "almost universally positive". Upworthy's Heather Wake reported on fans being moved to tears by the short. Based on online comments from fans, Urbach believed the team had succeeded in creating a meaningful reunion for Kirk and Spock. Blass also discussed online responses, saying the video was connecting with people who were not die-hard Star Trek fans and had been making "disgruntled middle-aged men cry".

Whitbrook described the video as a "bittersweet farewell to Trek's first generation of heroes" and noted the connections to various parts of the franchise. He thought viewers would primarily watch for the emotional farewell to Kirk and Spock, believing this moment overcame the uncanny valley effect of the digital recreations. Wake said the short gave Kirk and Spock the goodbye they deserved while also bringing closure for Star Trek fans who were disappointed by the characters' original endings. She called it a "tearjerking love letter to the two characters who first made [Star Trek] so special". Ryan Britt at Inverse similarly said the video was a "strange, sweet love letter to Star Trek's past" and one of the highlights of 2024 for the franchise. He thought the reunion between Kirk and Spock was a "wonderful end to one of the most enduring partnerships in science fiction", and said the video was an example of how "subtle art can be made from something that is also, fundamentally, canon-obsessed fan service". Writing for Engadget, Lawrence Bonk said the video was "surprisingly touching, particularly for die-hard Trek fans", and praised Giacchino's score for enhancing the emotions. Screen Rant's Dan Zinski felt the digital recreations fell into the uncanny valley, but the overall video captured the spirit of Kirk and Spock.

For The Telegraph, Christian Kriticos said the digital recreation technology was a "major leap forward for special effects". He thought its continued use in Star Trek storytelling may be apt due to the franchise's history with innovative technology, but also questioned using "forward-thinking technology to recreate the past" and have dead actors "live forever through artificial avatars, playing out endless adventures for our amusement". Dylan Roth wrote about the history of digital de-aging in film and television for Polygon and was mostly critical of it, but thought "Unification" was the best argument for it in 2024. He said the technology was needed to tell this story, rather than casting new actors, because it is actually a reunion between Shatner and Nimoy. Roth praised Witwer's performance, believing most viewers would assume they were watching a de-aged Shatner. He felt a Star Trek fan could try to tell this story with generative AI but would not be able match the short's results, and concluded that the de-aging technology "doesn't have to represent a creative doomsday" if it can be used to make critical viewers cry.

Several commentators discussed whether the video is part of official Star Trek canon since it was not produced by Paramount. Richard Fink at MovieWeb called it an expensive, high quality fan film, but Britt felt that term was not accurate. He thought fans could be confused by the video's connections to franchise canon but believed it aligned with previous projects. Joshua M. Patton of Comic Book Resources also believed the video did not "break" canon even though he was unclear whether it was part of it. Fink felt fans could each decide whether they considered it canon and said the most important thing was what it meant to individual viewers.
