= Bobby Beck =

American animator

- Occupations: CEO and President of AnimationMentor.com

Bobby Beck is the CEO and cofounder of the online animation school, Animation Mentor, which was started in March, 2005. It was the first post-secondary school that helped students to pursue a career in animation. At the school, students work with mentors from major studios in a production-style environment, and graduate with a professional demo reel.

Beck lives in Oakland, CA, he spends his spare time kiteboarding, playing music, doing random art projects and treasure hunting.

== Past work ==
Beck attended the Art College of San Francisco until his girlfriend found him his first job as an animator working at a game company based on character tests he did in his spare time for fun. In 1997, he joined Tippet Studios in Berkeley, CA, where he animated on the films My Favorite Martian and Virus. The following year, he moved to Los Angeles, where he animated on Dinosaur at Walt Disney Feature Animation. In 1999, Beck was offered a position as an animator at Pixar in Emeryville, CA. At Pixar, he animated on Toy Story 2, Monsters, Inc., Finding Nemo, The Incredibles, Cars, and the short film Boundin'.

== Animation Mentor ==
In September 2004, Beck left Pixar to devote himself full-time to running Animation Mentor. This was made possible by him and his then wife taking out their entire equity out of their home, where he began studying business development, leadership, administration, and education—and began working with a business coach.

Animation Mentor, which is headquartered in Emeryville, currently has more than 800 students and 50 full-time mentors from all over the globe. As AnimationMentor.com's CEO and President, Beck works with partners and cofounders Shawn Kelly and Carlos Baena to define the school's overall direction. He oversees the implementation of their collectively developed vision, which includes spearheading the school's business relationships, culture and curriculum and supervising the development of its Web 2.0 strategy and next generation tools.

== Filmography ==
- Cars (2006) (additional animator)
- The Incredibles (2004) (animator)
- Exploring the Reef (2003) (animator)
- Boundin' (2003) (animator)
- Finding Nemo (2003) (animator)
- Monsters, Inc. (2001) (animator)
- Dinosaur (2000) (animator)
- Toy Story 2 (1999) (animator)
- My Favorite Martian (1999) (animator)
- Virus (1999) (animator)
