= Golden Goblet Award for Best Animated Short Film =

Chinese film award

The Golden Goblet Award for Best Animated Short Film (Chinese: 金爵奖最佳动画短片) is a highest prize awarded to short films in the animation category of short film competition at the Shanghai International Film Festival since 2017.

== Award winners ==
Year	Film	Country
2017	Late Season	(Austria) Daniela Leitner
2018	Tweet- Tweet	(Russia) Zhanna Bekmambetova
2019	La Noria	(Spain) Carlos Baena
