= Robin Curtis =

American actress (born 1956)

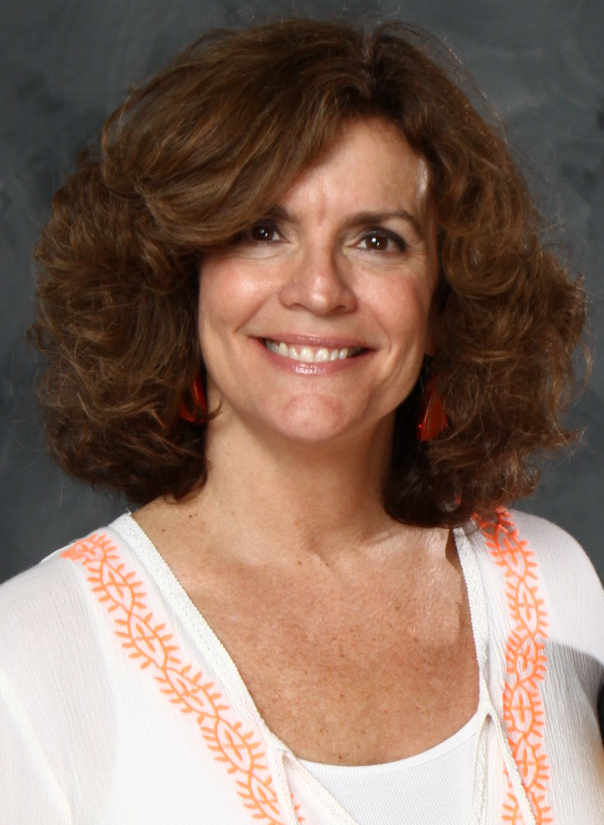
- Curtis in 2015
- Born: June 15, 1956 (age 70)
- Education: State University of New York at Oswego
- Occupation: Actress
- Years active: 1981–2005; 2022–present
- Known for: Star Trek III: The Search for Spock; Star Trek IV: The Voyage Home

Robin Curtis (born June 15, 1956), is an American actress. She is best known for replacing Kirstie Alley in the role of Vulcan Lieutenant Saavik in the film Star Trek III: The Search for Spock.

== Early years ==
Curtis is the daughter of Mr. and Mrs. Robert Curtis; her hometown is New York Mills, New York. She has two brothers. In 1974 she graduated from New York Mills Union Free School, where she acted in plays. She graduated from the State University of New York at Oswego in 1978, majoring in theater and communications.

== Career ==
=== Film ===
Curtis' first film was Ghost Story (1981). Next she starred as Vulcan Lieutenant Saavik in Star Trek III: The Search for Spock (1984). Her performance in the film drew a mixed reception from Trek fans. For The Search for Spock, Curtis was paid $30,000. She reprised the role of Saavik for a brief appearance in Star Trek IV: The Voyage Home (1986).

In the 1990s, Curtis was in Hexed, The Unborn 2, Babyfever, Bloodfist VI: Ground Zero, Hostile Intentions, Dark Breed, Santa with Muscles, Recoil, Scorpio One, The Sex Monster, and Making Contact.

In 2022, Curtis was cast in the horror film Awaken the Reaper, her first film role since 1999.

=== Television ===
She co-starred in the 1983 episode "Short Notice" during the first season of the Knight Rider television series. Curtis guest starred as Company operative Ginger Brock in The Equalizer, in the 1986 episode, "Dead Drop." In 1991, she portrayed Carol Pulaski on the soap opera General Hospital. In 1993, she portrayed an unrelated Vulcan character disguised as a Romulan (Tallera/T'Paal) in the two-part episode of Star Trek: The Next Generation titled "Gambit". In the Babylon 5 episode "Deathwalker" (1994), she appeared as Abbai Ambassador Kalika.

Curtis also appeared in the television series Dream On, Herman's Head, Night Court, MacGyver, and Johnny Bago. She starred in the made-for-TV movies In Love with an Older Woman, First Affair, Northstar, LBJ: The Early Years as Jacqueline Kennedy, Shootdown, and Tagteam.

=== Stage and commercial work ===
Curtis has numerous stage credits in regional and national theatre, including Gyspy, Applause, Oliver!, and ...And Other Songs in New York City. She performed in The City Suite off Broadway and in Garden in Los Angeles. Her other work includes The Nerd, The Man of La Mancha, and The Apple Tree. She has also appeared in several television commercials and infomercials.

Curtis made frequent appearances at Star Trek conventions starting in 1986 to the mid-1990s, but by 2014, she was appearing only occasionally. She became a residential real estate agent in 2004 and the following year debuted her one-woman show, a work-in-progress, Not My Bra, You Don't! – The Sexual Odyssey of a Forty-Nine-Year-Old Woman.

== Personal life ==
Curtis married Kent Williams after meeting on the set of The New Mike Hammer. They divorced soon afterwards.

== Filmography ==
=== Film ===
Robin Curtis film credits
Year	Title	Role	Notes
1981	Ghost Story	Rea Dedham	Directed by John Irvin
1984	Star Trek III: The Search for Spock	Lieutenant Saavik	Directed by Leonard Nimoy
1986	Star Trek IV: The Voyage Home	Lieutenant Saavik	Directed by Leonard Nimoy
1993	Hexed	Rebecca	Written and directed by Alan Spencer
1994	The Unborn 2	Linda Holt	Directed by Rick Jacobson
1994	Babyfever	Carol	Directed by Victoria Foyt and Henry Jaglom
1995	Bloodfist VI: Ground Zero	Major Marin	Directed by Rick Jacobson
1995	Hostile Intentions	Janine West	Written and directed by Catherine Cyran
1996	Dark Breed	Marian	Directed by Richard Pepin
1996	Santa with Muscles	Leslie	Directed by John Murlowski
1998	Recoil	Julie Sloan	Directed by Art Camacho
1998	Scorpio One	Shannon Brey	Directed by Worth Keeter
1999	The Sex Monster	Woman on Street	Written and directed by Mike Binder
1999	Making Contact		Directed by Molly Smith
2024	Awaken the Reaper	Connie	Written by Dave Campfield and directed by Dave Campfield and Justin Paul
2024	765874 – Unification	Saavik	Directed by Carlos Baena

=== Television ===
Robin Curtis television credits
Year	Title	Role	Notes
1982	In Love with an Older Woman	Michelle	Made-for-TV movie directed by Jack Bender
1983	Knight Rider	Nicole Turner	Episode: "Short Notice" (S 1:Ep 22)
1983	First Affair	Uncredited	Made-for-TV movie directed by Gus Trikonis
1985	MacGyver	Kate Connelly	Episode: "The Gauntlet" (S 1:Ep 4)
1985	Northstar	Jane Harlow	Made-for-TV movie directed by Peter Levin
1986	The Equalizer	Ginger Brock	Episode: "Dead Drop" (S 1:Ep 15)
1986	The New Mike Hammer	Peggy Ryan	Episode: "Dead Pigeon (S 3:Ep 2)
1987	Scarecrow and Mrs. King	Alice Trask Babcock	Episode: "Rumors of my Death" (S 4:Ep 14)
1987	MacGyver	Kate Connelly	Episode: "Friends" (S 2:Ep 20)
1987	Airwolf	Lynn	Episode: "Rogue Warrior" (S 1:Ep 13)
1987	LBJ: The Early Years	Jacqueline Kennedy	Made-for-TV movie directed by Peter Werner
1987	Private Eye	Eileen Quinlan	Episode: "War Buddy" (S 1:Ep 13)
1987	Rags to Riches	Eileen Newman	Episode: "Dear Diary" (S 2:Ep 5)
1988	CBS Summer Playhouse	Barbara	Episode: "Sniff" (S 2:Ep 12)
1988	Shootdown	1st Newswoman	Made-for-TV movie directed by Michael Pressman
1989	Night Court	Dr. Judith Malloy	Episode: "Mental Giant" (S 6:Ep 10)
1990	Dragnet	Vikki Lucas	Episode: "The Auditor" (S 2:Ep 15)
1990	Dream On	Doctor St. Claire	Episode: "Death Takes a Coffee Break" (S 1:Ep 2)
1991	Tagteam	Lt. Carol Steckler	Made-for-TV movie directed by Paul Krasny
1991	General Hospital	Carol Pulaski	1 episode dated March 26, 1991
1991	The New Adam-12	Mrs. Thomas	Episode: "Lock House" (S 2:Ep 11)
1992	Herman's Head	Diane Shaw	Episode: "Intern-al Affairs" (S 2:Ep 4)
1993	Johnny Bago	Nella	Episode: "Johnny Saves the World" (S 1:Ep 8)
1993	Star Trek: The Next Generation	Tallera / T'Paal	Episode: "Gambit" (2 Parts: S 7:Ep 4-5)
1994	Babylon 5	Ambassador Kalika	Episode: "Deathwalker" (S 1:Ep 9)
1995	Space: Above and Beyond	Andrea Wilkins	Episode: "Eyes" (S 1:Ep 6) uncredited
1996	Murder, She Wrote	Rosemary Tynan	Episode: "Murder Among Friends" (S 12:Ep 16)

=== Podcast ===
Robin Curtis television credits
Year	Title	Role	Notes
2016	Starship Excelsior: The Star Trek Audio Adventure	Commander Saavik	Episodes: "Impeccable Logic" (S 4:Ep 12) "Tomorrow's Excelsior" (S 4: E13)
