= Saavik =

Fictional character in the Star Trek universe

- Star Trek character
- Lt. (j.g) Saavik as portrayed by Kirstie Alley in Star Trek II: The Wrath of Khan
- First appearance: The Wrath of Khan (1982)
- Last appearance: 765874 - Unification (2024)
- Created by: Gene Roddenberry; Harve Bennett; Jack B. Sowards; Nicholas Meyer; Samuel A. Peeples
- Portrayed by: Kirstie Alley; Robin Curtis

In-universe information
- Species: Vulcan
- Affiliation: Starfleet
- Children: Sorak
- Posting: USS Enterprise navigator USS Grissom science officer USS Titan commanding officer
- Rank: Lieutenant, Junior Grade, Captain

Saavik is a fictional character in the Star Trek universe. She first appeared in the film Star Trek II: The Wrath of Khan (1982) played by Kirstie Alley. Robin Curtis took over the role for Star Trek III: The Search for Spock (1984) and Star Trek IV: The Voyage Home (1986).

== Fictional biography ==
Saavik's background was never explored on screen. It has, however, been fleshed out in novels and comic books, though none of these sources are considered canon. According to the novels and comics, Saavik was born on Hellguard, an abandoned Romulan colony, and is half Vulcan and half Romulan.

A line of dialogue that would have revealed this in The Wrath of Khan was edited out prior to the film's release and never restored; as a result, the canonicity of this piece of information has been debated for more than two decades. Saavik's mixed parentage is referenced often in her appearances in Star Trek novels. However, if Saavik's mixed ancestry were to be made canon, it would violate the continuity created by the Star Trek: The Original Series episode "Balance of Terror" (which takes place after Saavik's birth) in which Starfleet learns for the first time that Romulans resemble Vulcans, a fact that appears to be unknown to Vulcans (or at least the extremely knowledgeable Mr. Spock) as well.

Some non-canon novels, however, hold that at least some Vulcans were fully aware of the Romulans' heritage, but deliberately concealed that knowledge from the Federation, considering it an embarrassing internal affair that should not be revealed to their allies. The TV series Star Trek: Enterprise established in canon that some factions of the Vulcan government were aware of the connection as early as the 22nd century. (There has also been some debate about whether Spock rescued the child Saavik before or after the events that occurred during "Balance of Terror". A rescue occurring after the episode would not be in conflict with the Vulcans' knowledge of Romulans.)

A few sources have her (non-canon) origin story aligned to original material found in the film's novelization, as follows: she was rescued from the colony, along with other children, by Spock, and she was cared for by his parents Ambassador Sarek and Amanda Grayson. Following in the footsteps of her mentor, Spock, she entered Starfleet Academy.

In the non-canon 1990 novel The Pandora Principle, written by Carolyn Clowes, it is established that four Vulcan research ships were captured by Romulans. Their Vulcan crews were abducted by Romulan scientists and their fertility was manipulated to produce half-Romulan, half-Vulcan children such as Saavik to use in mind control experiments. Vulcan scientists learned of the experiments and mounted a secret rescue of Saavik and other child survivors on Hellguard. Spock threatened to reveal the story to Federation authorities and along with it the secret of the Vulcan mating cycle pon farr if the survivors were denied Vulcan citizenship. Other members of the party wanted to educate them elsewhere and send the children to live on worlds other than Vulcan. Clowes writes that Saavik's name is of Romulan origin and translates as "little cat". In The Pandora Principle, Saavik, unlike the other half-Vulcan, half-Romulan child survivors, refuses a DNA test that would identify her Vulcan relatives. Instead, Spock, who has established a bond with her, takes a year of personal leave to "civilize" and educate the 9- or 10-year-old Saavik. She then lives off Vulcan with foster families or at boarding schools chosen by Spock until she is accepted into the Starfleet Academy as a teenager. This agrees with the Star Trek III: The Search for Spock novelization which said Saavik has never been to Vulcan until then. After graduating, as a fresh Lieutenant Saavik was on her cadet cruise on the USS Enterprise with Admiral James T. Kirk and Captain Spock when Kirk's old enemy Khan Noonien Singh sought revenge for the failure of the Ceti Alpha V colony and the death of his wife, Marla McGivers, and attacked the Enterprise.

Spock died while saving the Enterprise during the events of Wrath of Khan, but before his death transferred his katra to Dr. Leonard McCoy. His coffin was fired from the Enterprise in orbit around the Genesis Planet and was believed to have been destroyed in the atmosphere. A rare expression of emotion by a Vulcan is displayed when Saavik is seen shedding a tear during the eulogy for Spock by Kirk. Saavik and David Marcus (son of Admiral James T. Kirk), subsequently were assigned to the research vessel USS Grissom to study the newly formed Genesis Planet. During this mission, Saavik discovered that Spock had somehow been regenerated, and was rapidly aging. As the new Spock entered his teenage years, he began experiencing the mating drive known as pon farr, and Saavik helped Spock through this difficult time. When the Klingon commander Kruge and his men captured the landing party the next day, David sacrificed his life to save Saavik from being executed. Saavik helped Admiral Kirk return Spock to Vulcan, where his body and katra were reunited. Afterwards, she remained on Vulcan with Spock's family for reasons never explained on screen; the film's writers intended that this was because she was pregnant with Spock's child as a result of the pon farr, but no references to her pregnancy made it into the finished movie and it was initially not followed up, thereby once again placing this development into a grey area in terms of canon. Before the Enterprise crew departed Vulcan, Saavik told Captain Kirk how his son had died bravely, sacrificing himself to save both Spock and herself. In the 2024 short film 765874 – Unification Saavik is shown wordlessly introducing Kirk to a grown Vulcan male (played by Mark Chinnery and named Sorak in the credits) indicating he was her son.

== Unrealized concepts ==
Saavik was at one point to appear in the Star Trek: The Next Generation episode, "Cause and Effect" in a scene in which the Enterprise-D encounters a starship that had been trapped in a time anomaly for some 80 years. The idea was dropped when Kirstie Alley insisted on being paid more for a nonspeaking cameo part than the episode budget could supply. (Saavik was to have been shown standing alongside a character played by Kelsey Grammer, Alley's Cheers co-star.)

The character of Saavik was originally intended to appear in Star Trek VI: The Undiscovered Country, which would have revealed her as a traitor to the Federation. The idea of using an established character was dropped and instead a new character, Valeris, was created, whom Douglas Brode described as "a dark doppelgänger of the heroic Saavik". According to director Nicholas Meyer, writing in his autobiography, The View from the Bridge, Saavik was dropped from the film and Valeris created when Kirstie Alley proved unwilling to reprise the role and Meyer didn't like Curtis's portrayal of the character, while Leonard Nimoy, in his autobiography I Am Spock, said there were also second thoughts about casting a popular, established character as a villain. Saavik, however, does appear in the novelization of the film, as a recruiting officer who inspires Valeris to join Starfleet, and offers some insights on how to deal with a dual heritage.

== Other appearances and Next Generation continuity ==
In the novel Vulcan's Heart, which takes place some years after Undiscovered Country, an older Saavik marries Spock. Saavik appears again in the Vulcan's Soul trilogy of novels published from 2004. In this continuity, the character has risen to the rank of captain. In the Titan novel, Taking Wing, it is clearly stated that Spock and Saavik are married, as she sends greetings through Tuvok. Star Trek books are not considered part of the established canon.

In the "Mirror Universe Saga" trilogy of novels written by William Shatner, it is revealed that the Mirror Universe's Intendant Spock had a daughter named T'Val with Mirror Saavik.

Kirstie Alley did play Saavik one other time, in a play that was set between The Wrath of Khan and The Search for Spock, "The Machiavellian Principle" written by Walter Koenig for the ambitious "Ultimate Fantasy" convention. It also starred James Doohan, Mark Lenard (not as Sarek), Walter Koenig, Nichelle Nichols and George Takei, with a walk-on role by William Shatner as "the Admiral". The short script was eventually published by Creation Conventions in a booklet about Koenig's career, called "Through the Looking Glass". It misspells the name in the cast list as "Savik".

== Early reference ==
Samuel A. Peeples' unused script, Worlds That Never Were, for the second Star Trek film, had a male character called "Doctor Savik", who eventually was morphed into the female Lieutenant Saavik.

== Reception ==
Her character has been discussed by a number of scholars in the context of changing the representation of women characters in the Star Trek franchise. Mary Ann Tetreault noted how her story has marked the change in the style of how females are portrayed in Star Trek, noting that "she is not conventionally pretty", nor is she "subordinate to the men in the story", and that she "is shown to be much more capable" than many of them. Anne Cranny-Francis, discussing her character's background as revealed in a 1990 novel, The Pandora Principle, by Carolyn Clowes, described her as one of the "strong and courageous" women in early Star Trek stories. Likewise, Gary Westfahl called her "a strong and independent character", also noting that Saavik's character was "effectively destroyed when the producers refused to meet Alley's salary demands and recast the role in the next two films with a spectacularly untalented and vacuous actress, Robyn Curtis, transforming Saavik from a woman warrior to a wallflower". Sociologist Bärbel Schomers similarly characterized Saavik as an important character and strong female role, and listed her among several such figures that were conspicuously removed from the Star Trek franchise shortly after their introduction.

Donald E. Palumbo stated that the Star Trek movies closely conform to the structure of the monomyth as described by Joseph Campbell. In this view, Saavik provides the "supernatural aid" to Kirk in The Wrath of Khan. She is also the "navigator" in this and the following two films. In The Search for Spock, "the reborn Spock appears to have at least a mystical marriage on Genesis with Saavik", who here takes the role of "the goddess as ’good mother’ who helps him survive pon farr".
