= Animation Mentor =

California-based online animation school

- Type: for-profit online education provider
- Established: 2005; 21 years ago
- Founders: Bobby Beck, Shawn Kelly, and Carlos Baena
- President: Rob Kingyens
- Location: New York, New York, United States
- Website: www.animationmentor.com

Animation Mentor is an online for-profit animation school in New York City, New York, United States.

== History ==
The school was founded in 2005 by three working animators: Bobby Beck, who was the original CEO and president of the school, Shawn Kelly, who is a working animator at Industrial Light & Magic, and Carlos Baena, who is a working animator. The school opened on March 27, 2005, with 350 students and 5 employees. In 2021, Animation Mentor was acquired by Yellowbrick Learning, Inc. and Rob Kingyens became the CEO.

== See also ==
- Computer animation

== Further reading and listening ==
- Interview with Co-founders
- CG Society Interviews Co-founders
- Interview with Shawn Kelly and Carlos Baena
