= Sam Witwer =

American actor (born 1977)

- Witwer at GalaxyCon St Louis in 2026
- Born: October 20, 1977 (age 49); Glenview, Illinois, U.S.
- Education: Juilliard School
- Occupations: Actor; voice actor; musician
- Years active: 2001–present

Sam Witwer (born October 20, 1977) is an American actor. He is known for his roles as Crashdown in Battlestar Galactica, Davis Bloome in Smallville, Aidan Waite in Being Human, Mr. Hyde in Once Upon a Time, Ben Lockwood in Supergirl, Rupert Chipping in Riverdale, and the voice of Darth Maul in Star Wars.

Witwer has worked on numerous projects in the Star Wars franchise, having first provided his voice and likeness for Starkiller in the Force Unleashed video game series. He later notably voiced Darth Maul in the television series The Clone Wars, Maul – Shadow Lord, and Rebels, as well as the film Solo. He has also voiced the Son in The Clone Wars and Emperor Palpatine in Rebels and various other projects respectively. Witwer portrayed protagonist Deacon St. John through motion capture for the video game Days Gone by Bend Studio.

== Early life ==
Witwer was born on October 20, 1977, and grew up in Glenview, Illinois, a suburb north of Chicago. Ever since he was a child, Witwer showed enthusiasm in other pursuits he enjoyed more than school. He spent his free time huddled over a computer, playing Dungeons and Dragons, or making music.

He attended Glenbrook South High School, during which time he was involved in drama and theater classes, as well as being the lead singer of a high school band called "Love Plumber". After he barely graduated from high school, his parents made him apply to drama departments of various schools, until he was finally accepted to the Juilliard School. When he was 18 he became friends with fellow actor Glenn Howerton.

After two years at Juilliard, Witwer was expelled due to his behavior. He finally made the decision to pursue acting after asking actor Bruce Campbell for advice on the AOL website.

== Career ==
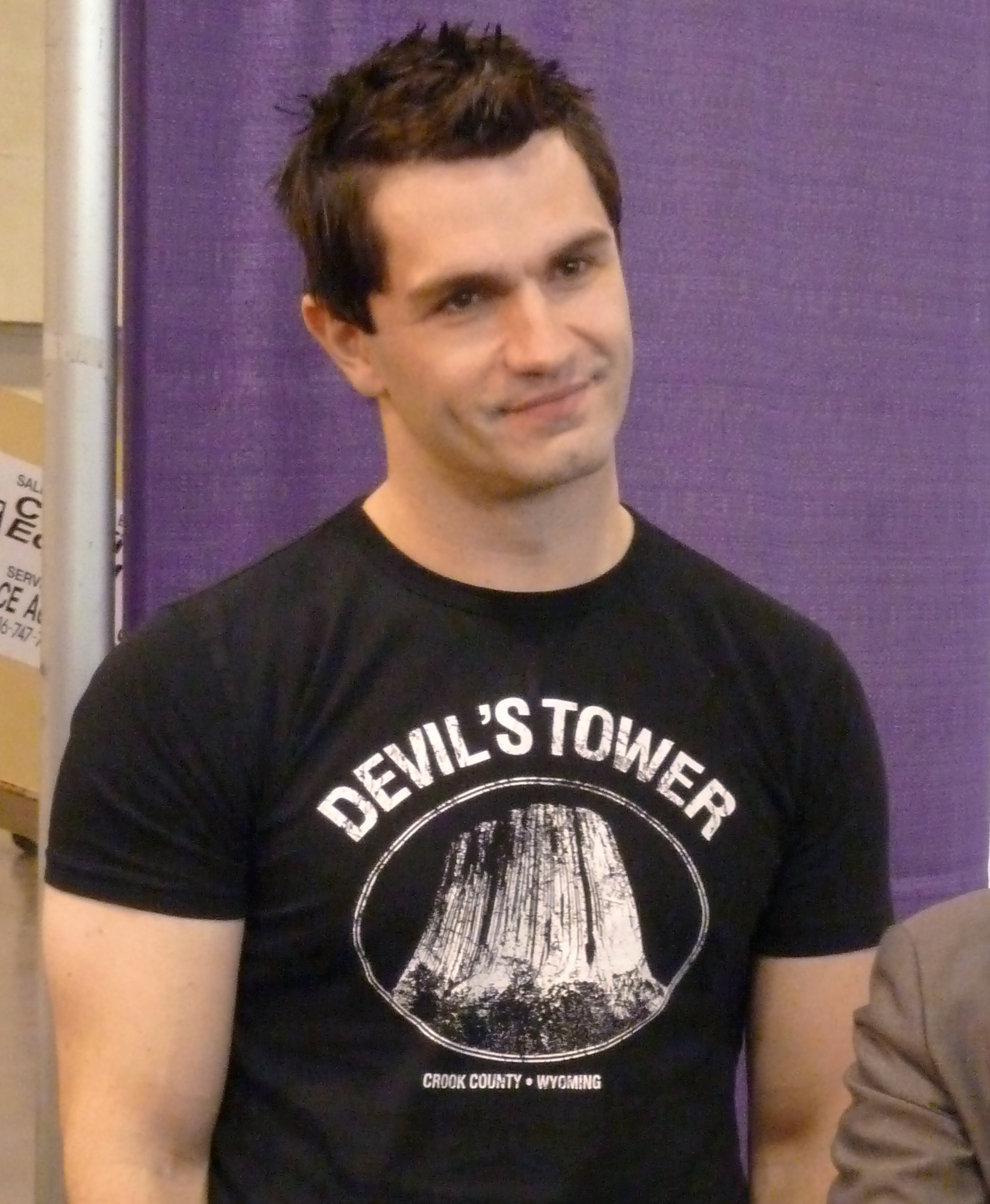
Witwer at Wizard World Toronto in 2012

Witwer's first on-screen credit was in a Chicago Bulls commercial. He soon found himself in speaking roles on hit television series, such as ER.

Witwer's first major recurring role was that of raptor pilot 'Crashdown' (his call sign) on Battlestar Galactica, although he has credited much of his current success to his role as Neil Perry on the Showtime series Dexter. Witwer also appeared as Private Wayne Jessup in the film The Mist.

From 2008 to 2009, Witwer appeared in season 8 of Smallville as Davis Bloome, the human form of Doomsday. Witwer played Davis while Doomsday was played by stuntman Dario Delacio. Witwer's performance in Smallville was well-received, and he has stated that his experience on the show had opened more opportunities for him in the future of acting. Witwer's contract gave him the option to return in season 9 as Zod, though he ultimately declined. Though he considered his time on the show enjoyable and was flattered by the offer to stay on, he passed on the role as he felt it would be difficult for both the characters and audience to accept.

Witwer made a cameo appearance in The Walking Dead as a dead zombie soldier in a tank in the season 1 episode "Days Gone Bye" which reunited him with director Frank Darabont from The Mist. Coincidentally, in 2019 he went on to portray the main protagonist (both voice and motion capture) of a video game called Days Gone, which also tackles the topic of zombie apocalypse.

From 2011 to 2014, Witwer starred in the North American remake of Being Human. He played the lead role of vampire Aidan Waite. The show, as well as his performance, was well received and lasted 4 seasons.

He voiced Ocean Master in the animated film Justice League: Throne of Atlantis for the DC Universe Animated Original Movies series, replacing fellow Star Wars actor Steve Blum from Justice League: War.

In 2016, Witwer played Edward Hyde on Once Upon a Time, recurring for part of its sixth season after debuting at the end of the fifth season.

In 2018, Witwer joined the main cast of The CW drama series Supergirl, portraying the fourth season's main antagonist Ben Lockwood / Agent Liberty.

In 2026, Witwer began narrating the YouTube videos of the U.S. Chemical Safety Board after the retirement of Sheldon Smith.

=== Role-playing games ===
Witwer plays both pen-and-paper and role-playing video games. He has been a frequent guest on the Podcast Order 66 and has expressed interest in Star Wars role-playing games Star Wars: The Roleplaying Game (by West End Games) to Star Wars Roleplaying Game (by Wizards of the Coast) and to the series of cross-compatible Star Wars roleplaying games by Fantasy Flight Games.

Witwer appeared in episode 19 of Geek and Sundry's Tabletop playing the Dragon Age role-playing game, and episodes 29 and 55 of Dice Camera Action as Mordenkainen.

In January 2017, he appeared as a guest on a play-through of ScratchPad Publishing's Dusk City Outlaws, alongside Elisa Teague, Tom Lommel, Spencer Crittenden, and game designer Rodney Thompson.

=== Star Wars ===
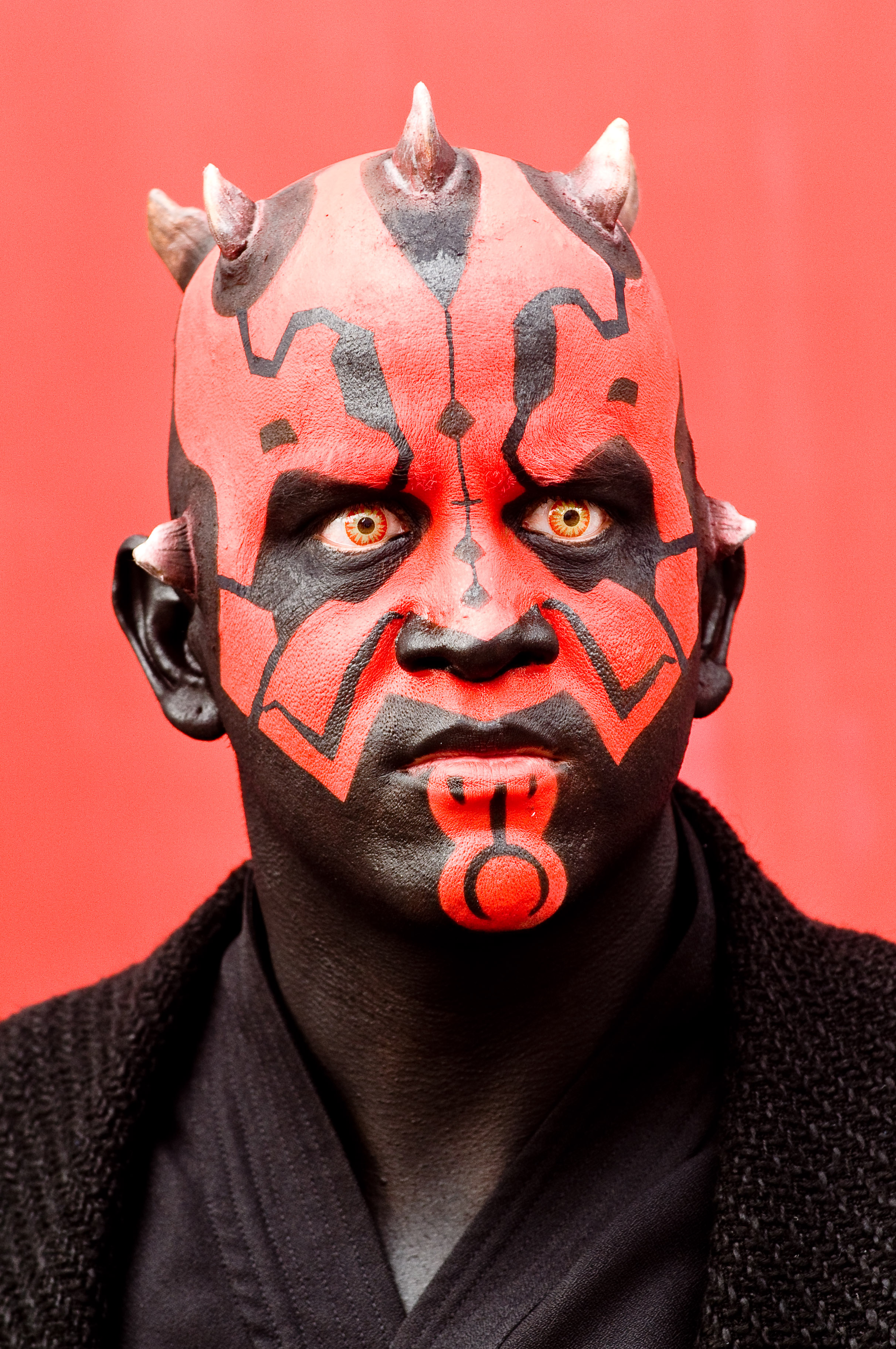
Witwer has voiced Darth Maul in several Star Wars media.

A lifelong Star Wars superfan, Witwer provided both his voice and likeness for lead character Galen Marek / Starkiller (Darth Vader's secret apprentice) in the 2008 video game Star Wars: The Force Unleashed and 2010 sequel Star Wars: The Force Unleashed II. He also voiced Darth Sidious (Emperor Palpatine) in the first game, and reprised it for the games Disney Infinity 3.0 and Battlefront and for the original season 2 premiere of Star Wars Rebels; however, in 2019, the role was re-dubbed by Ian McDiarmid who portrayed Palpatine in the films and in Rebels season 4.

For Star Wars: The Clone Wars, Witwer had also vocally performed the Son in a three episode story arc (known as the Mortis trilogy) in season 3 as well as the iconic former Sith Maul in the season 4 finale episodes, four episodes of season 5, and the "Siege of Mandalore" arc in season 7. He also lent his voice for Maul in other projects such as the Star Wars: Episode I Brisk commercial as well as the Cartoon Network special Lego Star Wars: The Empire Strikes Out, and again for Star Wars Rebels. On September 27, 2012, a feature-length "director's cut" of Witwer's season 4 finale episodes of The Clone Wars were released as a direct-to-video film, Darth Maul Returns, initially made available exclusively at Target.

Witwer attended The Clone Wars season 5 Red Carpet Premiere in Orlando, Florida on August 24, 2012, during Celebration VI along with some of his co-stars Matt Lanter, James Arnold Taylor, Dee Bradley Baker, Tom Kane, Daniel Logan, Stephen Stanton and Ashley Eckstein, as well as Supervising Director Dave Filoni. During Celebration VI, he also had his own panel called: Sam Witwer "The Maul Within" on August 26, 2012. In 2013, he attended for the first time the annual event, Star Wars Weekends at Disney's Hollywood Studios in Orlando, Florida for a three-day weekend and fans praised him for his roles in The Force Unleashed games and on The Clone Wars. During the live show "Behind the Force", Sam showed his acting skills by saying one or two lines of the characters that he's played in the Star Wars universe.

Witwer has also voiced an alien as well as a First Order stormtrooper during the siege of Maz Kanata's palace in Star Wars: The Force Awakens.

In 2018, Witwer reprised his portrayal as Maul and performed the voice acting role for the character in Solo: A Star Wars Story, marking the sixth project for which Witwer voices Maul, and the first live-action performance.

In 2020, Witwer was cast as an unidentified dark side character in the StarWarsKids.com and YouTube game show Star Wars: Jedi Temple Challenge, which premiered on June 3, 2020.

In 2026, Witwer returned to voice Maul as the lead role in the Disney+ show, Star Wars: Maul – Shadow Lord.

=== Star Trek ===
In 2024, Witwer appeared in the Star Trek concept video "765874 – Unification", where he played the role of James T. Kirk along with William Shatner. The role involved the use of "digital prosthetic" technology, where Shatner's facial features were overlaid onto Witwer's, as Witwer portrayed Kirk in three different timelines. Discovering Shatner's lack of "inner monologue", as the actor has described in an autobiography, greatly informed Witwer's performance, not only in words, he said, but in action and presence. Witwer made the discovery when he viewed his performance in one take and was unhappy with how "un-Kirklike" it seemed. "Shatner would never passively walk into a scene," Witwer said in an interview. "He leads us into a scene. He takes the audience with him and they go on a story." With that, Witwer adjusted his performance and was much happier with it.

=== Music career ===
Witwer serves as the front-man for the band The Crashtones, whose first studio album Colorful of the Stereo was released February 15, 2006. Witwer released a new album on May 7, 2019, entitled Revenge of the Crashtones.

== Filmography ==
Key
| † | Denotes films that have not yet been released |

=== Film ===
| Year | Title | Role | Notes |
|---|---|---|---|
| 2006 | Crank | Shootout Henchman | |
| 2007 | The Mist | Private Jessup | |
| 2008 | Pathology | Party Boy | |
| 2009 | Gamer | Social Worker | |
| 2010 | The United Monster Talent Agency | Dracula | Short film |
| 2010 | No God, No Master | Eugenio Ravarini | |
| 2011 | The Return of Joe Rich | Joe Neiderman | |
| 2012 | Star Wars: The Clone Wars – Darth Maul Returns | Maul | Voice |
| 2014 | Space Dogs: Adventure to the Moon | Kazbek | Voice; English dub |
| 2015 | Tales of Halloween | Hank | Short film |
| 2015 | Justice League: Throne of Atlantis | Ocean Master | Voice; Direct-to-video |
| 2015 | Wrestling Isn't Wrestling | Chyna | Short film |
| 2015 | Star Wars: The Force Awakens | Alien, Stormtrooper, Additional Characters | Voices |
| 2016 | Rogue One | Stormtrooper, Additional Characters | Voices |
| 2016 | Officer Downe | Burnham | |
| 2017 | Star Wars: The Last Jedi | Additional voices | |
| 2018 | Solo: A Star Wars Story | Maul | Voice; cameo |
| 2019 | Star Wars: The Rise of Skywalker | Additional voices | |
| 2024 | 765874 – Unification | James T. Kirk | Short film |

=== Television ===
| Year | Title | Role | Notes |
|---|---|---|---|
| 2001 | ER | Tommy | Episode: "Fear of Commitment" |
| 2001, 2003 | JAG | Beasley, Sonar Operator | 2 episodes |
| 2001 | Arliss | Mourner | Episode: "Of Cabbages and Kings" |
| 2002 | Dark Angel | Marrow | Episode: "Love in Vein" |
| 2002 | She Spies | Jason | Episode: "Daddy's Girl" |
| 2003 | Angel | John Stoler | Episode: "Shiny Happy People" |
| 2003 | The Lyon's Den | Bryce Cherot / Chucke Porter | Episode: "Duty to Save" |
| 2003 | Star Trek: Enterprise | Sloth #3 | Episode: "The Shipment" |
| 2004 | Cold Case | James Creighton | Episode: "The Plan" |
| 2004 | NCIS | Staff Sgt. Rafael | Episode: "Split Decision" |
| 2004 | Star Trek: New Voyages | Guardian's Voice | Episode: "In Harm's Way" |
| 2004–2005 | Battlestar Galactica | Crashdown | 11 episodes |
| 2006 | Dexter | Neil Perry | 3 episodes |
| 2006 | Bones | Mitchell Downs | Episode: "The Titan on the Tracks" |
| 2007 | It's Always Sunny in Philadelphia | Muscular Guy in Store | Episode: "Dennis and Dee's Mom Is Dead" |
| 2007 | Shark | Richard Lee Franco | Episode: "Every Breath You Take" |
| 2007–2008 | CSI: Crime Scene Investigation | Officer Casella | 2 episodes |
| 2008–2009 | Smallville | Davis Bloome | Main role (Season 8), 12 episodes |
| 2010 | The Walking Dead | Tank Soldier | Uncredited; Episode: "Days Gone Bye" |
| 2011–2014 | Being Human | Aidan Waite | 52 episodes Nominated–Canadian Screen Award for Best Actor in a Continuing Leading Dramatic Role |
| 2011–2014, 2020 | Star Wars: The Clone Wars | Maul, The Son | Voices; 14 episodes Nominated–Daytime Emmy Award for Outstanding Performer in an Animated Program |
| 2012 | Lego Star Wars: The Empire Strikes Out | Maul, Emperor Palpatine | Voices; Television special |
| 2014 | Grimm | Max Robbins | Episode: "The Show Must Go On" |
| 2015–2018 | Star Wars Rebels | Maul, Emperor Palpatine | Voices; 7 episodes |
| 2015 | Stalker | Jamie Tolliver | Episode: "Love Kills" |
| 2015 | Rosewood | Heath Casablanca | Episode: "Aortic Atresia and Art Installations" |
| 2016 | Once Upon a Time | Mr. Hyde | 5 episodes |
| 2017 | Electric Dreams | Chris | Episode: "Real Life" |
| 2018–2020 | Supergirl | Benjamin Lockwood / Agent Liberty | 18 episodes |
| 2018–2020 | Star Wars Resistance | Hugh Sion | Voice; 3 episodes |
| 2019–2020 | Riverdale | Rupert Chipping | 5 episodes |
| 2020 | DC Universe All Star Games | Himself / Host | 6 episodes |
| 2020 | Star Wars: Jedi Temple Challenge | Dark Side agent | |
| 2021 | Lego Star Wars: Terrifying Tales | Maul / Trudgen | |
| 2021–2022 | The Book of Boba Fett | Rodian, sous-chef droid | Voice; uncredited; 2 episodes |
| 2022 | Andor | Shoretrooper | Voice; uncredited; Episode: "Announcement" |
| 2022 | Mythic Quest | Ian's father | Episode: "Sarian" |
| 2024 | 765874 – Unification | Capt. James T. Kirk | |
| 2025 | Leverage: Redemption | Peter Luna | Episode: "The Scared Stiff Job" |
| 2026–present | Star Wars: Maul – Shadow Lord | Maul, Darth Sidious, Young Savage Opress | Voice; Lead role; 10 episodes Consulting Producer; 10 episodes |

=== Video games ===
| Year | Title | Role | Notes |
|---|---|---|---|
| 2008 | Star Wars: The Force Unleashed | Starkiller, Emperor Palpatine | Also likeness |
| 2008 | Soulcalibur IV | Starkiller | English version |
| 2010 | Star Wars: The Force Unleashed II | Starkiller, Emperor Palpatine | Also likeness |
| 2012 | Kinect Star Wars | Emperor Palpatine | |
| 2015 | Disney Infinity 3.0 | Darth Maul, Emperor Palpatine | |
| 2015 | Star Wars Battlefront | Emperor Palpatine | |
| 2016 | Lego Star Wars: The Force Awakens | Emperor Palpatine | |
| 2017 | Star Wars Battlefront II | Darth Maul, Emperor Palpatine | |
| 2019 | Days Gone | Deacon St John | Also likeness and motion capture |
| 2019 | Star Wars Jedi: Fallen Order | Emperor Palpatine | Cameo |
| 2020 | Star Wars: Squadrons | Walla actor | |
| 2021 | Star Trek Online | Tenavik | |
| 2022 | Lego Star Wars: The Skywalker Saga | Darth Maul, Emperor Palpatine | |
| 2022 | The Callisto Protocol | Captain Leon Ferris | Also likeness |
| 2023 | Horizon Forbidden West | Walter Londra | Burning Shores downloadable content, also likeness |

=== Audiobooks (excerpt) ===
- 2022: Michael Reaves: Star Wars: Darth Maul: Shadow Hunter, Novel, Random House Audio & Audible
