= Daren Dochterman =

Daren R. Dochterman
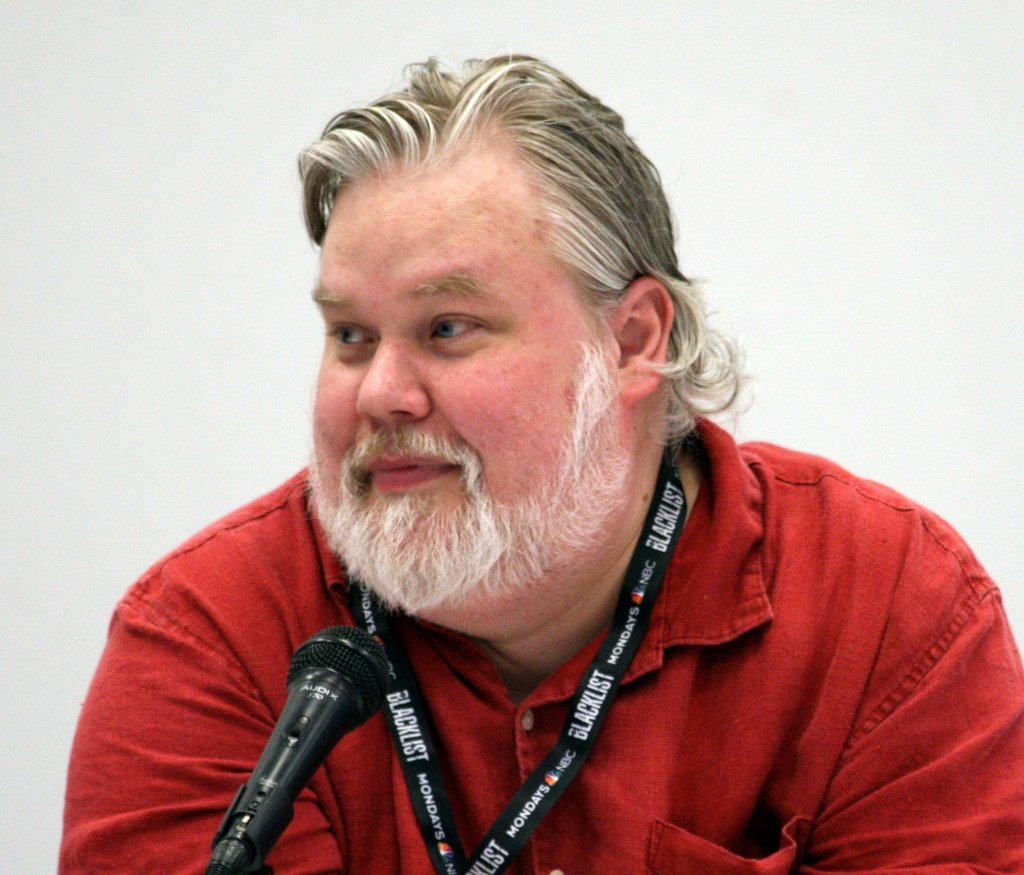
- Dochterman at Wondercon 2014
- Born: Daren Ross Dochterman; July 2, 1967 (age 58) New York, New York, United States
- Occupation: Concept artist / Illustrator
- Education: University of Southern California

Website
- www.darendoc.com

Daren R. Dochterman (born July 2, 1967) is an American illustrator and set-designer. He illustrated for Get Smart, Rush Hour 3, Monster House, Poseidon, Sky High, and Master and Commander: The Far Side of the World. He is otherwise credited with The Chronicles of Riddick, The Terminal, Dr. Seuss' How the Grinch Stole Christmas, The Flintstones in Viva Rock Vegas, The Nutty Professor, Sleepless in Seattle, and James Cameron's The Abyss. Dochterman has twice been a guest of honor at the science, science fiction, and fantasy convention, CONvergence.Dochterman was recognized for his work by having shared a Video Premier Award for his supervision of visual effects in the movie Star Trek: The Motion Picture. He was also a conceptual illustrator on the film G.I. Joe: The Rise of Cobra.

== Early life ==
Daren Dochterman was born in 1967, he spent his early childhood living in the suburbs of New York City. He would then go on to spend his teenage years in the Chicago area, graduating from Fenton High School in Bensenville, Illinois. Dochterman always loved drawing, but not necessarily the structure of his earlier art classes. He also participated in other fine arts programs during his early education.

== Education and early career ==
Darren Dochterman attended the University of Southern California, beginning his freshman year in 1985 as an undeclared major. He had applied twice to the USC School of Cinema-Television, and rejected once. He enrolled in all the Film classes he could, which led to him supporting himself financially with graphics work that he did for student films. He helped run the Post Production Department in his Sophomore year. After two years of maintaining an undeclared status at the university, and six rejection letters from the Cinema School, Dochterman chose to look for work.

Dochterman spent a year working as a model builder, prop maker, graphic artist and gofer allowing him to gain professional experience. Then, a friendship with a fellow USC student led him to working for director James Cameron to help restore full size props and models from the film Aliens. A job as the Assistant to the Art department for Cameron's film, The Abyss, helped integrate him into the movie production industry. He even appeared in the film as a news reporter.

Darren Dochterman expanded his expertise in 1990 by deciding to develop skills working with digital art.

== Art Department credits ==
- Journey 2: The Mysterious Island (2012), concept artist/concept illustrator
- Real Steel (2011), concept artist
- Priest (2011), production illustrator
- TRON: Legacy (2010), production illustrator
- Iron Man 2 (2010), conceptual illustrator
- G.I. Joe: The Rise of Cobra (2009), concept illustrator
- Dragonball: Evolution (2009), concept artist
- The Day the Earth Stood Still (2008), conceptual artist
- Get Smart (2008), concept artist
- Rush Hour 3 (2007), illustrator
- Monster House (2006), conceptual artist
- X-Men: The Last Stand (2006), conceptual artist
- Poseidon (2006), production illustrator
- Sky High (2005), production illustrator
- The Terminal (2004), conceptual artist
- The Chronicles of Riddick (2004), illustrator
- Master and Commander: The Far Side of the World (2003), production illustrator
- Clockstoppers (2002), illustrator
- Alien Hunter (2001), concept art
- How the Grinch Stole Christmas (2000), production illustrator
- The Flintstones in Viva Rock Vegas (2000), production illustrator
- The Story of Us (1999), illustrator
- The Saint (1997), illustrator
- The Nutty Professor (1996), storyboard artist
- Down Periscope (1996), illustrator
- Se7en (1995), illustrator
- Star Trek: Voyager (1995), illustrator
- Junior (1994), illustrator
- Earth 2 (1994), illustrator - 1 episode
- World War II: When Lions Roared (1994), illustrator
- Monkey Trouble (1994), storyboard artist
- Freaked (1993), storyboard artist
- Sleepless in Seattle (1993), illustrator
- Honey, I Blew Up the Kid (1992), illustrator
- What About Bob? (1991), junior illustrator
- The Exorcist III (1990), assistant to production designer
- The Abyss (1989), assistant to art department
