= Shawn Kelly =

American animator

- Occupation: Co-founder of AnimationMentor.com

Shawn Kelly is an animator of movies and was a co-founder of the company Animation Mentor, an online animation school with student/mentor relationships at its core.

== Life and career ==
Born in Sonoma County, Calif., and raised in Petaluma, Kelly set his sights on working at Industrial Light and Magic (ILM) at age five when the movie Star Wars hit the big screen. Under the tutelage of animators Bill Hennes and John Root, he studied drawing and computer software throughout high school, attended community college, and Academy of Art University in San Francisco.

A summer internship at ILM introduced Kelly to another influential mentor, animation director Wayne Gilbert. It was through Gilbert that Kelly realized that he wasn’t learning what he needed at school. Kelly left the academy in 1996 for a job as a character animator at former video game and educational company Presage Software, but continued his studies with Gilbert twice a week.

In 1998, Kelly fulfilled his lifelong dream and landed a job at ILM. Since that time, he has worked on numerous films including War of the Worlds, for which he animated tripods and probes; Star Wars: Episode III – Revenge of the Sith, where he helped develop and animate the vulture droids and animated Yoda in a pivotal sword fight; and Rango, where he was the Lead Animator for both the Mayor of Dirt and the Spirit of the West. Kelly also worked as Lead Animator on all five Transformers movies. Kelly’s credits feature 29 films including Hulk, the Star Wars prequels, AI: Artificial Intelligence, and The Avengers.

Because Kelly realized his dream to animate films with the help of three mentors who took a personal interest in his career, he became convinced that animation lovers everywhere should have the same opportunity, and he co-founded Animation Mentor, an online animation school with student/mentor relationships at its core. Kelly works with Bobby Beck, Animation Mentor’s CEO and President, and cofounder Carlos Baena to help define and shape the school’s overall direction. Kelly balances his Animation Mentor role with his work as a senior animator at Industrial Light & Magic.

Kelly lives in California with his wife Jen, and writes short films.

== Awards ==
- Kelly received the 2007 award for the ‘Best Single Visual Effect of the Year’ by the Visual Effects Society (VES), an organization dedicated to advancing the arts, sciences and the application of visual effects. Kelly’s winning effect was for the desert highway sequence of Transformers, in which Bonecrusher skates through traffic, destroys a bus, and fights Optimus Prime.
- Kelly has developed curriculum and taught at the Academy of Art University and was on the team that earned the 2000 CLIO award for Best Computer Animation for a Pepsi/Star Wars “Alien” campaign.

== Filmography ==
- Jack Frost (1998) (CG character animator: ILM)
- Star Wars: Episode I – The Phantom Menace (1999) (character animator: ILM)
- The Adventures of Rocky & Bullwinkle (2000) (character animator)
- Artificial Intelligence: AI (2001) (animator: ILM)
- Star Wars: Episode II – Attack of the Clones (2002) (animator: ILM)
- Hulk (2003) (CG character animator)
- Pirates of the Caribbean: The Curse of the Black Pearl (2003) (animator)
- The Day After Tomorrow (2004) (animator)
- Star Wars: Episode III – Revenge of the Sith (2005) (animator)
- War of the Worlds (2005 film) (2005) (animator)
- Eragon (2006) (character animator)
- Transformers (2007) (lead animator: ILM)
- The Spiderwick Chronicles (2008) (animator)
- Indiana Jones and the Kingdom of the Crystal Skull (2008) (animator: ILM)
- Transformers: Revenge of the Fallen (2009) (lead animator: ILM)
- Rango (2011) (post-production) (lead animator: ILM)
- Transformers: Dark of the Moon (2011) (post-production) (lead animator: ILM)
- The Avengers (2012) (animator)
- Battleship (2012) (animator)
- G.I. Joe: Retaliation (2013) (animator)
- Pacific Rim (2013) (animator)
- Noah (2014) (lead animator)
- Transformers: Age of Extinction (2014) (animator)
- Teenage Mutant Ninja Turtles (2014) (animator)
- Jurassic World (2015) (animator)
- Teenage Mutant Ninja Turtles: Out of the Shadows (2016) (Associate Animation Supervisor)
- Warcraft (2016) (animator)
- Transformers: The Last Knight (2017) (lead animator)
- Avengers: Infinity War (2018) (Associate Animation Supervisor)

== Further reading and listening ==
- ILM Tour
- Autodesk Siggraph interview 2012
- Shawn Kelly Video Interview at Blender Nation
- Shawn Kelly Interview at BobbyPontillas.blogspot.com
- Shawn Kelly Video Interview at Vimeo
- ILM Animator Shawn Kelly Talks about Transformers: Rise of the Fallen at Alice Radio
- KNTV Talks to Shawn Kelly Talks about Transformers: Rise of the Fallen at KNTV
