= Star Trek: The Motion Picture (novel) =

1979 novelization of the film Star Trek: The Motion Picture

- 1979 pb. cover
- Author: Gene Roddenberry
- Language: English
- Genre: Science fiction
- Publisher: Pocket Books
- Publication date: December 1979
- Publication place: United States
- Media type: Print (Hardback)
- Pages: 252 pp
- ISBN: 0-671-25324-7 (hb.); 0-671-83088-0 (pb.)
- OCLC: 5751478
- Dewey Decimal: 813/.5/4
- LC Class: PS3568.O3424 S7 1979
- Followed by: The Entropy Effect

Star Trek: The Motion Picture. A Novel is a 1979 novelization of the film Star Trek: The Motion Picture, which was released in the same year. It is especially notable for being the only Star Trek novel to be written by Gene Roddenberry, who created the franchise. The book was also the first Star Trek novel published by Pocket Books.

== Publishing history ==
The novelization of Star Trek: The Motion Picture was the first Star Trek novel published by Pocket Books, beginning a prolific relationship with the franchise that continues as of 2024. At the time the book was published, however, Bantam Books held the rights to publish original Star Trek-based fiction; Pocket Books wouldn't publish its first original Trek novel until 1981.

A decade later, Pocket Books would be releasing one or more new Star Trek novels every month, with the cumulative books being called "by far the biggest series of fiction in the history of western literature."

== Authorship ==
This novel is sometimes erroneously credited to Alan Dean Foster, likely due to his having ghostwritten the Star Wars novelization for George Lucas, but Foster only contributed to the film's story. The novelization was written solely by Roddenberry. However, Roddenberry adapted the novel from the movie screenplay originally written by Harold Livingston, which greatly irritated the screenwriter. Roddenberry received a $400,000 advance for the novel.

== Plot summary ==
The original historic 5-year mission is over. All of the Enterprise's original crew have pursued other jobs, only to be called back into action. The USS Enterprise has been refitted and the original crew must deal with an incredibly destructive power that threatens the Earth and the human race.

== Critical reception ==
In a humorous review in Tor.com, Ellen Cheeseman-Meyer described the novel as "a cross between an encyclopedia and a roller coaster" while also noting the book's "interesting sexual revelations about the Kirk family." A review by Kevin Church echoes some of these points, such as how Captain Kirk's first name is a tribute to his mother's "love instructor". Church concludes by saying the novel "is a bizarre artifact that's fascinating on its own to a certain sort of fan" but is "not worth the time for anyone who’s not interested in poking around the weird edges of the Star Trek mythos."
