= Carlos Baena (animator) =

Spanish animator

- Born: December 7, 1974; Las Palmas, Canary Islands, Spain
- Occupation: Animator
- Years active: 1998–present
- Known for: Animation Mentor

Carlos Baena (born December 7, 1974) is a professional animator and a cofounder of the online school Animation Mentor.

== Life and career ==
Baena was born in 1974 in Las Palmas, Canary Islands, and raised in Madrid, Spain. In 1993, he came to the United States to attend the University of San Francisco and the Academy of Art University. After graduating in June 1998, he found a job animating commercials at Will Vinton Studios in Portland, Oregon. Four months later, he returned to San Francisco to work on spots and short films at Click 3X and WildBrain, Inc. Working on commercials and short films helped him secure a position at San Rafael, CA.-based Industrial Light & Magic (ILM) in March 2001. At ILM, Baena worked as an animator on Jurassic Park III, Men in Black II, and Star Wars: Episode II – Attack of the Clones. Eventually, Baena left ILM for Pixar in 2002 where he worked on the films Finding Nemo, The Incredibles, Cars, Ratatouille, WALL-E, and Toy Story 3 as well as the short film Boundin'.

For Cars, Baena animated several scenes with the two Italian cars Guido and Luigi and received a 2007 Annie Award nomination for Best Character Animation for his work.

Baena works with fellow cofounders, Bobby Beck, AnimationMentor.com's CEO and President, and Shawn Kelly to define and shape the school's overall direction. Baena balances his co-founder responsibilities with his full-time animator job at Pixar in Emeryville, California.

== Awards ==
Premios Fugaz al cortometraje español

Year	Award	Film	Result
2019	Best Animated Short Film	La Noria	Winner

== Filmography ==
=== Animation Department ===
- Hubert's Brain (2001) - (animator)
- Finding Nemo (2003) - (animator)
- Boundin' (2003) - (animator)
- Exploring the Reef (2003) - (Video short; animator)
- The Incredibles (2004) - (animator)
- Cars (2006) - (animator)
- Ratatouille (2007) - (animator)
- WALL-E (2008) - (animator)
- Toy Story 3 (2010) - (animator)
- Monsters University (2013) - (character development and animation)

=== Visual Effects ===
- Jurassic Park III (2001) - (CG animator)
- Men in Black II (2002) - (animator: air chase and post office sequences, ILM)
- Star Wars: Episode II – Attack of the Clones (2002) - (animator: ILM)

=== Short films ===
- The Roddenberry Archive: The Cage (2022) - (director)
- 765874 – Unification (2024) - (director)
