= Total Recall =

Total Recall may refer to:

- Eidetic memory
- Hyperthymesia

== Total Recall franchise ==
- Total Recall (1990 film), a film starring Arnold Schwarzenegger and Sharon Stone
  - Total Recall, a 1989 novelization by Piers Anthony
  - Total Recall (video game), a 1990 computer and NES game
  - Total Recall (1990 soundtrack), the soundtrack to the 1990 film
- Total Recall (2012 film), a remake starring Colin Farrell and Kate Beckinsale
  - Total Recall (2012 soundtrack), the soundtrack to the 2012 film
- Total Recall 2070, a 1999 Canadian television series inspired by the 1990 film

== Television ==
- Total Recall (game show), an Australian game show

=== Episodes ===
- "Total Recall", Crossing Jordan season 5, episode 6 (2005)
- "Total Recall", Family Guy season 11, episode 18 (2013)
- "Total Recall", Fanboy & Chum Chum season 1, episode 22 (2010)
- "Total Recall", Fired Up season 2, episode 5 (1997)
- "Total Recall", Holby City series 7, episode 22 (2005)
- "Total Recall", My Three Sons season 3, episode 33 (1963)
- "Total Recall", Prisoners of Gravity season 5, episode 10b (1993)
- "Total Recall", Stingers season 7, episode 34 (2004)
- "Total Recall", Z.O.E. Dolores, I episode 10 (2001)

== Music ==
- Total Recall (Luni Coleone album)
- Total Recall (Negative Approach album)
- "Total Recall", a song by The Sound
- "Total Recall" (Tom Robinson song), a 1980 song by Sector 27 on the album Sector 27

== Literature ==
- "Total Recall", a short story by Larry Sternig, first published in the Fall 1946 issue of Planet Stories
- Total Recall, a 1984 novel by Warren Murphy; the 58th installment in The Destroyer novel series
- Total Recall, a 2001 V. I. Warshawski detective novel by Sara Paretsky
- Total Recall: How the E-Memory Revolution Will Change Everything, a 2009 non-fiction book by Gordon Bell and Jim Gemmell
- Total Recall: My Unbelievably True Life Story, a 2012 autobiography by Arnold Schwarzenegger

== See also ==
- Perfect recall (disambiguation)
- Recall (disambiguation)
