= Star Trek V: The Final Frontier =

1989 sci-fi film

- Theatrical release poster art by Bob Peak
- Directed by: William Shatner
- Screenplay by: David Loughery
- Story by: William Shatner; Harve Bennett; David Loughery
- Based on: Star Trek by Gene Roddenberry
- Produced by: Harve Bennett
- Starring: William Shatner; Leonard Nimoy; DeForest Kelley; James Doohan; Walter Koenig; Nichelle Nichols; George Takei
- Cinematography: Andrew Laszlo
- Edited by: Peter E. Berger
- Music by: Jerry Goldsmith
- Production company: Paramount Pictures
- Distributed by: Paramount Pictures
- Release date: June 9, 1989
- Running time: 106 minutes
- Country: United States
- Language: English
- Budget: $33 million
- Box office: $63 million

Star Trek V: The Final Frontier is a 1989 American science fiction film directed by William Shatner and based on the television series Star Trek created by Gene Roddenberry. It is the fifth installment in the Star Trek film series, and takes place shortly after the events of Star Trek IV: The Voyage Home (1986). Its plot follows the crew of the USS Enterprise-A as they confront renegade Vulcan Sybok, who is searching for God at the center of the galaxy.

The film was directed by cast member William Shatner, following two films directed by Leonard Nimoy. Shatner developed the initial storyline, in which Sybok searches for God but instead finds a devil, drawing inspiration from the phenomenon of televangelism and the high potential for fraud among its practitioners. Series creator Gene Roddenberry disliked the original script, while Nimoy and DeForest Kelley objected to the premise that their characters, Spock and Leonard McCoy, would betray Shatner's James T. Kirk. The script went through multiple revisions to please the cast and Paramount Pictures, including cuts in the effects-laden climax of the film.

Despite a Writers Guild strike cutting into the film's pre-production, Paramount commenced filming in October 1988. Many Star Trek veterans assisted in the film's production; art director Nilo Rodis developed the designs for many of the film's locales, shots, and characters, while Herman Zimmerman served as its production designer.

Production problems plagued the film on set and during location shooting in Yosemite National Park and the Mojave Desert. Because effects house Industrial Light & Magic's best crews were busy and would be too expensive, the production used Bran Ferren's company for the film's effects, which had to be revised several times to lower production costs. The film's ending was reworked because of poor test-audience reaction and the failure of some planned special effects. Jerry Goldsmith, composer for Star Trek: The Motion Picture, returned to score The Final Frontier.

The Final Frontier was released in North America on June 9, 1989. It had the highest opening gross of any Star Trek film at that point and was number one in its first week at the box office; however, its grosses quickly dropped in subsequent weeks. The film received generally negative reviews by critics on release, and, according to its producer, "nearly killed the franchise". The next entry in the series, Star Trek VI: The Undiscovered Country (1991), received a much more positive reception.

== Plot ==
The USS Enterprise (NCC-1701-A) is newly commissioned, and its crew are enjoying shore leave after the starship's shakedown cruise, with Kirk, Spock, and McCoy camping at Yosemite National Park. Their leave is interrupted when the Enterprise is ordered by Starfleet Command to rescue a human, a Klingon, and a Romulan, all diplomats who have been taken hostage on Nimbus III, a planet set aside as a neutral location to advance dialogue among the Federation, Klingon Empire, and Romulan Star Empire. Learning of the Enterprise's mission, the ambitious Klingon Captain Klaa decides to pursue Kirk for personal glory.

On Nimbus III, the Enterprise crew discovers that Sybok, a renegade Vulcan, is behind the hostage crisis, prompting Spock to admit that Sybok is his half-brother. After the Enterprise crew saves the hostages, Sybok reveals that the hostage-taking was a ruse to lure a starship, which he plans to use to travel to the mythical planet Sha Ka Ree. Sybok believes it lies behind the Great Barrier, a powerful energy field at the galaxy's center, and that God is located there. To take control of the ship, Sybok uses his ability to reveal and heal the innermost pain of a person through the Vulcan mind meld, thus gaining the loyalty of most of the crew. McCoy's pain is that he had helped fulfill his terminally ill father's request to die, only to find later that a cure could have saved his father's life, which has caused him years of guilt. Spock's pain is the knowledge that his father rejected him at birth for being "too human". Kirk refuses to let Sybok remove his pain, claiming that it is necessary to make him human.

The Enterprise successfully breaches the Great Barrier, unaware they are being followed by Captain Klaa's warship, a Klingon bird-of-prey. They discover a lone barren planet, and Sybok, Kirk, Spock, and McCoy take a shuttlecraft down to the surface. It appears uninhabited, but after Sybok calls out, a glowing field appears which quickly morphs through many forms representing various religions before settling into the image of a bearded human face, to which Sybok explains that they have come for "your wisdom". The entity asks how they breached the barrier, and upon being told about the Enterprise, it declares that it will use the ship to carry its wisdom to every corner of the universe. A skeptical Kirk asks "What does God need with a starship?", and when the entity asks who he is, Kirk expresses doubt that the actual supreme being would not already know. Irritated, the entity attacks him and Spock, after which they discover it is a powerful and malicious being, imprisoned on Sha Ka Ree in the distant past, with the Great Barrier put in place to keep it from escaping.

Realizing his earlier naiveté, Sybok apologizes and attempts to distract the entity by physically attacking it, allowing the others the opportunity to escape. Kirk orders the Enterprise to fire a photon torpedo at the entity, but only Sybok is killed by the strike. Spock and McCoy beam back to the ship moments before the Klingon ship unexpectedly attacks and damages the Enterprise, stranding Kirk on the planet with the weakened and enraged entity. As Kirk attempts to escape from the entity, the Klingon Bird of Prey arrives and destroys the entity with a volley of disruptor fire. Kirk is beamed aboard the Klingon ship, where Spock is unexpectedly waiting. As Spock explains, he convinced the Klingon General Korrd (one of Sybok's hostages who had become a loyal follower) to order Captain Klaa to stand down and apologize for his actions, which Klaa grudgingly does. After returning to Earth, Kirk, Spock, and McCoy resume their camping trip at Yosemite.

== Cast ==
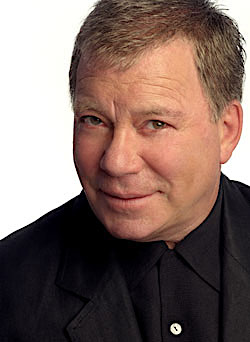
Shatner reprised his role as Capt. Kirk and also served as director.

- William Shatner as Captain James T. Kirk. Shatner practiced aerobics and strength training daily to prepare for the role. The physical activity and directing duties meant he woke at 4 a.m. every day during filming, no matter what time he fell asleep.
- Leonard Nimoy as Spock, the Enterprise's half-Vulcan, half-human science officer. Nimoy noted The Final Frontier was the most physical film in the series, which reflected Shatner's energetic sensibility and what he enjoyed doing most on the show—"running and jumping". Nimoy recalled Shatner's attempts to instruct him in riding a horse, although Nimoy had ridden many horses bareback when playing American Indian roles for Republic Pictures serials.
- DeForest Kelley as Leonard McCoy, chief medical officer. Kelley also noted the physicality required for the film and enjoyed doing things that he had not been asked to do in years. "I was very pleased to see that he [Shatner] brought it along in fine style," he said. Kelley noted that his own ambition to direct had deserted him after seeing difficulties Nimoy faced directing the previous two Star Trek films.
- Laurence Luckinbill plays Sybok. Sean Connery was originally offered the role, but was busy with Indiana Jones and the Last Crusade; the mythical planet Sha Ka Ree was named in his honour. Shatner discovered Luckinbill by chance; channel surfing late one night, he saw him perform as Lyndon B. Johnson. When Shatner called to offer him the role, Luckinbill accepted immediately.

The other members of the USS Enterprise-A crew include chief engineer Montgomery Scott (James Doohan), helmsman Hikaru Sulu (George Takei), navigator Pavel Chekov (Walter Koenig), and communications officer Nyota Uhura (Nichelle Nichols). Takei said that, despite studio pressure to complete the film on time, Shatner maintained a creative and enthusiastic atmosphere on set. "I have enormous admiration for his ability to block that kind of pressure from seeping on to the set." Takei said that he found the biggest challenge of the film was learning to ride horses. Moreover, Takei acknowledged, "despite our sometimes strained personal history, I found working with Bill [Shatner] as a director to be surprisingly pleasant."

Casting director Bill Shepard was in charge of filling additional roles. He combed through initial auditions with promising actors, then presented his choices to Shatner. Both men called the actors back as many as two or three times before each role was cast. Additional players include Todd Bryant as Klingon Captain Klaa, with Spice Williams-Crosby as Vixis, Klaa's lieutenant. Bryant was playing ping pong at a beach party when a casting director offered him the role. Bryant performed his audition twice, as Shatner requested that he repeat his performance speaking in Klingon. Williams-Crosby thought Vixis was Kirk's girlfriend when she arrived for her audition, but recalled afterwards that it was "fun" to play a villain. David Warner, Charles Cooper, and Cynthia Gouw play the Federation, Klingon, and Romulan ambassadors to Nimbus III. Warner did not audition, but agreed to the role after Shatner swore that his character would survive the film. The director originally intended George Murdock to play the Klingon diplomat Korrd, but changed his mind on seeing Cooper's performance. Murdock was recast as the "God" entity. Bill Quinn played McCoy's father in one of his last roles. Producer Harve Bennett made a cameo as a Starfleet admiral.

== Production ==
=== Development ===
During the 1966–1969 Star Trek television series, William Shatner and Leonard Nimoy's lawyers drafted what Shatner termed a "favored nations clause", with the result that whatever Shatner received—e.g., a pay raise or script control—Nimoy also got and vice versa. Nimoy had directed Star Trek III: The Search for Spock and Star Trek IV: The Voyage Home. Shatner had previously directed plays and television episodes; when he signed on for The Voyage Home following a pay dispute, Shatner was promised he could direct the next film.

Shatner conceived his idea for the film's story before he was officially given the director's job. His inspiration was televangelists; "They [the televangelists] were repulsive, strangely horrifying, and yet I became absolutely fascinated," he recalled. Shatner was intrigued that, not only did these personalities convince others God was speaking directly to them, but they became wealthy by what Shatner considered false messages. The televangelists formed the basis for the character Zar, later Sybok. Shatner's first outline was titled An Act of Love, and many of its elements—the Yosemite vacation, the abduction of Klingon, human and Romulan hostages on the failed paradise planet—survived to the final film. In Shatner's early draft, James T. Kirk is overwhelmed by Zar's superior numbers of followers and Spock, Leonard McCoy and the rest of the Enterprise crew come to believe in Zar's divinity. Kirk feigns acceptance of Zar's beliefs to travel with him to the God planet, which, to Shatner, would be a desolate, fiery waste. When Kirk confronts "God", the image of the being transforms into that of Satan, and Kirk, Spock and McCoy split up in their escape. Kirk eludes capture but goes back to save his friends from being carried away to Hell.

Shatner had presented his idea to Paramount studio head Frank Mancuso while filming The Voyage Home. Mancuso liked Shatner's idea and agreed to hire a writer to draft a film treatment. Shatner wanted novelist Eric Van Lustbader, but negotiations between Lustbader and Paramount failed over the author's requested $1 million salary. Shatner dictated the story himself and gave it to Paramount's production president Ned Tanen for input.

Producer Harve Bennett was exhausted by his work on the previous three Star Trek films and wanted to move on, feeling that he was not part of the Star Trek "family" and that he had been mistreated by Nimoy. When Shatner tried to convince Bennett to reconsider, the producer insisted on a meeting at his home. After several hours of discussion Bennett agreed to return. Bennett disagreed with several elements of Shatner's story, feeling that, because no-one could assuredly answer the question of God's existence, the ending of the film would never be satisfying. Bennett also told Shatner that the film had the feeling of a tone poem rather than an adventure story. The studio agreed with Bennett, reasoning that the subject matter could be too weighty or offensive to theatergoers.

Shatner and Bennett began reworking the story. Concerned that knowing the renegade Sybok's motivation from the beginning of the story was anticlimactic, the team moved the revelation to later in the story. Shatner said that Bennett also suggested turning the God entity into an "evil alien pretending to be God for his own gain". Having satisfied themselves and Paramount with the adjustments, Shatner and Bennett approached Star Trek II: The Wrath of Khan writer and director Nicholas Meyer to pen the script, but he was unavailable. Bennett found a script by David Loughery and showed his work to Shatner, who agreed that he would be a good fit for the task of scripting Star Trek.

Not everyone was happy with the story. Star Trek creator Gene Roddenberry objected to the characters' search for God in general, and, more particularly, the idea of a God as portrayed by Western religion. One of Roddenberry's employees suggested some of his employer's animosity towards the story stemmed back to Star Trek: The Motion Picture. Roddenberry had wanted to approach that film with similar ideas that investigated the nature of God but was rejected by Paramount. Roddenberry, Nimoy and DeForest Kelley all disagreed that Spock and McCoy would betray Kirk, which Loughery explained was done to give a conflict in which "one man stands alone" from the rest.

Loughery stopped work on the script when the Writers Guild of America went on strike, and the production was further delayed when Nimoy began working on The Good Mother. During this time, Shatner reconsidered elements of the Star Trek V story; he made Sybok's character softer and more sympathetic. When the writers' strike ended, Loughery returned to work on the script, while Shatner flew to the Himalayas for a job. When he returned, he felt betrayed by Loughery's revisions, which he felt transformed the search for God into the search for the mythical paradise Sha Ka Ree—a word play on "Sean Connery", whom they wanted for Sybok's role. Though Shatner convinced Bennett and Loughery to revise much of the script, Sha Ka Ree remained; it was changed to a place of ultimate knowledge of which Sybok had received visions. The script was also rewritten to address Nimoy and Kelley's concerns.

While Roddenberry, Kelley and Nimoy gave their approval to the revised script, Paramount was concerned that the film would go over-budget as written and ordered cuts. Shatner's envisioned angels and demons at the film's climax were converted to rock monsters that the false god would animate from the earth. Shatner wanted six of the creatures, but was forced to accept just one. Concerned that the franchise's momentum following The Voyage Home had disappeared, Paramount rushed the film into production in late 1988, despite the writers' strike cutting into pre-production.

=== Design ===
Nilo Rodis, who had worked on two previous Star Trek features, was appointed as art director, and worked with Shatner to establish the film's visual design. Shatner sought a grittier and more realistic feel to the Star Trek universe, and so the two worked together to visualize the film from start to finish. After Shatner explained the entire story in a day-long session, Rodis went home and sketched out each scene from the script. Shatner was pleased with the results, especially with Rodis' designs for Shatner's most expansive or dramatic shots.

Rodis' input in developing the early character and costume designs was significant. Shatner praised his costume designs as being futuristic but plausible and in keeping with the continuity established in previous Star Trek films. After being disappointed by the costume designers approached to realize Rodis' ideas, Shatner suggested that Rodis become the costume designer as well. Bennett hired Dodie Shepard as the costume supervisor; Shepard's role was to oversee the costume fabrication and keep track of the clothes during filming. To save on costs, Shepard clothed extras with existing items from Western Costume's warehouses. The constrained budget meant Shatner could not completely redesign the Starfleet uniforms, but Rodis created new brown field uniforms for the film's location scenes as well as the leisure clothes the crew wears during shore leave.

Rodis and Shatner also drew up sketches of what the various aliens seen in the film would look like. Shatner picked Kenny Myers as the special-effects makeup artist. Myers discussed the sketches with Shatner and made casts of actors' faces using dental alginate. These casts were used for close-up, high-quality "A" makeups, as well as less complicated masks for far-away and background characters. Shatner hired Richard Snell as makeup supervisor, advising him to make each Klingon forehead distinct.

Shatner hired Herman F. Zimmerman as production designer. His decision was based on Zimmerman's work on the sets for Star Trek: The Next Generation, and he felt that the designer could convey Shatner's futuristic yet grounded aesthetic. Zimmerman was immediately put in charge of designing all-new sets for the bridges of Enterprise and the Klingon Bird-of-Prey, elevator and access shafts, and Nimbus III interiors. At one point, he was building five sets at once. Art department head Michael Okuda created LCARS backlit controls on the Klingon ship and Enterprise. The corridors for the Enterprise were the same as those used in the Next Generation television series. The bridge set alone cost $250,000. The Nimbus III city of Paradise was one of the last locations to be designed and created, because its design relied on what exterior location and terrain was used. Zimmerman created a sketch of the town's layout over three days, drawing inspiration from a circular Moroccan fortress. Creation of the city cost $500,000 and took five weeks of construction in 100 °F (38 °C) heat.

Tim Downs scouted possible areas for location filming. He looked for a location that could stand in for three different venues without the production having to move or change hotels: the film's opening scene; the God planet's establishing shots; and the Nimbus III Paradise City. Downs was familiar with the Mojave Desert and thought that locations near Ridgecrest, California, would serve the production's needs, so he took photos based on sketches Rodis had provided of what the locations might look like. Downs also shot photos with filters and tried to accomplish dust effects with his car to replicate ideas for how some sequences would be shot. When Downs returned with the photos, Shatner felt that the locations the scout found would be perfect for the film.

=== Filming ===
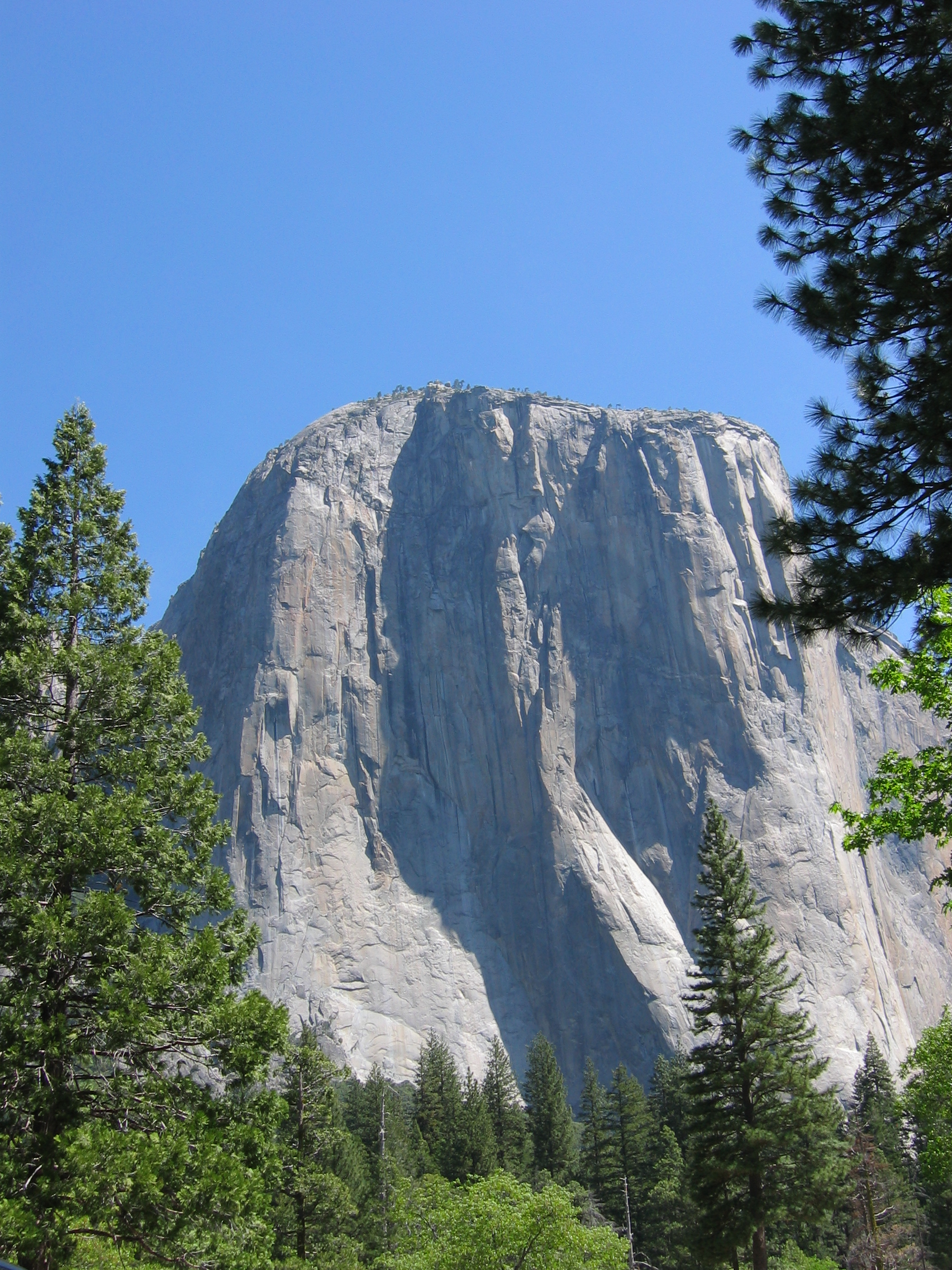
A fiberglass model on location at Yosemite stood in for the real El Capitan, pictured here

Principal photography began in October 1988, in and around Los Angeles, California. Shortly before the beginning of location shooting, Hollywood union truck drivers or teamsters went on strike to protest pay cuts and overtime changes. With deadlines looming, the production searched for non-union drivers, aware that the Teamsters might retaliate by sabotaging equipment or flying airplanes above the filming to ruin audio recordings. After one of the production's camera trucks exploded in the studio parking lot, the non-union drivers headed to Yosemite National Park under cover of darkness with a police escort.

The film's Yosemite scenes were all shot on location. Long shots of Kirk scaling the mountain were filmed with stunt doubles, while Shatner's closer shots had him on a fiberglass set positioned in front of the camera, with the real mountains visible in the background. Aided by two trainers, Shatner had spent weeks at the Paramount lot, learning to climb a wooden replica. Laszlo scouted out a tall peak on which the production created a rock face with safety net. The overhead shot gave the impression Kirk was climbing at a great height, while unnatural background features such as swimming pools were camouflaged. In the scene, Spock watches Kirk's ascent, levitates up behind him as a pest giving suggestions with the outcome that Kirk slips and Spock saves him using levitating boots. Most of the shots framed Nimoy from the waist up; in these scenes the actor was supported by a crane that gave the appropriate "float" to achieve the effect. Bluescreen footage of Shatner falling was shot later at Paramount and composited, while stuntman Ken Bates set a record for the highest American descender fall by plummeting off El Capitan—with a wire support rig—for long shots. In reviewing the dailies of the first two days of shooting, the production realized that a pine tree in the frame during Kirk and Spock's mountain dialogue ruined the illusion of height, while a shot of Shatner clinging to the face of El Capitan appeared muddy due to clouds obscuring the sun and ruining the depth of field. The scenes had to be reshot later.

After the Yosemite shots, location shooting moved to desert locales. Nimbus III and its town, Paradise City, were recreated in the Mojave. The town was created as a haphazard collection of spaceship parts and futuristic scrap. Shatner "cracked" during the filming in 110 °F (43 °C) heat, insulting the head electrician and ignoring Laszlo's request for additional setup time. When a driver failed to appear and stranded Shatner and a skeleton crew, a park ranger came to the rescue and the production managed to film scenes of Sybok's followers before they lost daylight. Shatner called the resulting half-jogging pace of the dehydrated extras "the Sybok shuffle". The production spent three more weeks filming the rest of the desert scenes, finishing the last night scene shortly before sunrise and the trip back to Los Angeles.

At Paramount, the crew filmed all the scenes that would take place on soundstages, including the Enterprise and Bird-of-Prey sets, the Paradise City interiors, and the campfire location. Production was smoother on set, and the crew shot scenes ahead of schedule. The crew fabricated a stand-in set for the God planet location, where additional scenes were filmed to combine with the location footage. Spock's catching of Kirk as the captain falls off El Capitan was filmed against a set that replicated the forest floor and was rotated ninety degrees.

Shatner scheduled the campfire scenes to be the last ones shot, after which the cast and crew had a small celebration before a traditional wrap party later. The cast celebrated the end of filming in the last week of December 1988, and gave a press conference on the set of the Enterprise bridge on December 28. Shatner returned to Paramount Studios a few days after principal photography had wrapped to organize the film's post-production schedule. This included showing a rough cut of the film—minus the special effects—to studio personnel. Shatner recalled that the film received praise and left the screening "reveling" in its reception; it turned out to be a "momentary victory" once he saw the special effects.

=== Effects ===
During the writers' strike, producer Ralph Winter confronted what writer Paul Mandell termed an "unenviable" effects situation. Industrial Light & Magic had provided the effects for the three previous Star Trek films, and Winter wanted them to work on The Final Frontier. However, all of the effects house's best technicians were busy working on Indiana Jones and the Last Crusade and Ghostbusters II. With a stretched budget and short timeframe, Winter had to look elsewhere. To save time and money, he planned to create as many effects as he could either on stage, or through camera trickery. The producers solicited test footage from various effects houses to judge which was best able to create the film's main effects, including the planet Sha Ka Ree and the godlike being which resided there. Bran Ferren's effects company, Associates and Ferren, was chosen. Ferren had worked on films such as Altered States and Little Shop of Horrors.

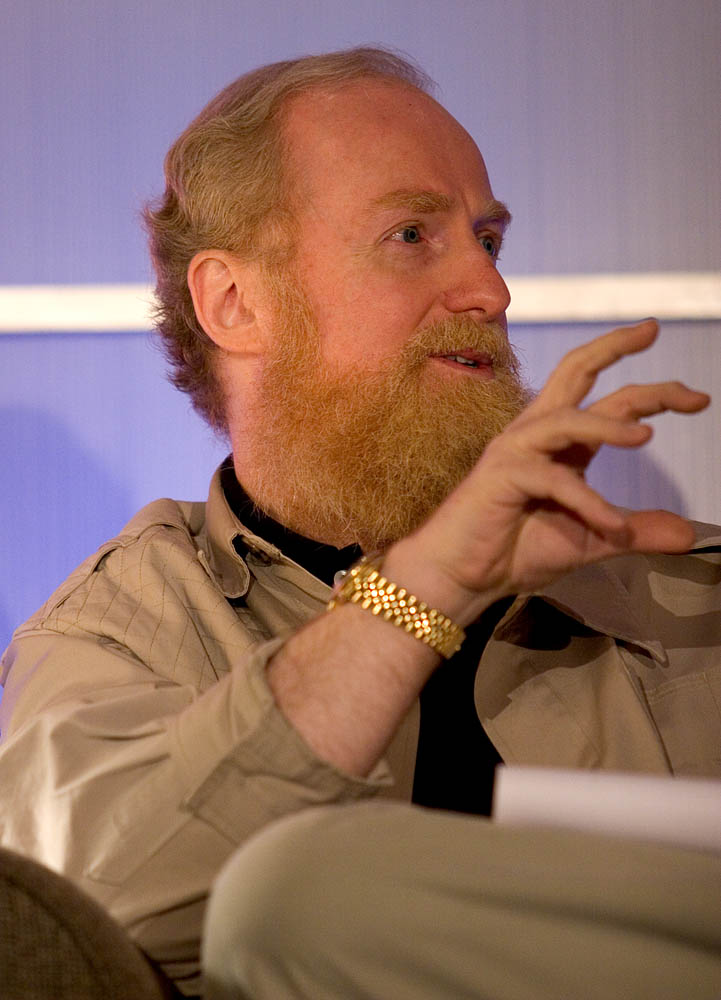
Bran Ferren was chosen to develop the film's optical effects after Industrial Light & Magic's best teams proved too expensive

Associates and Ferren had three months to complete the effects work—around half the usual industry timeframe. Shatner insisted on viewing much test footage before he proceeded with each shot, requesting time-consuming changes if he did not like an effect. Ferren promoted a "low-tech" approach to realizing complicated effects, but his cost estimates were too expensive and interfered with the scope of other live-action sequences. Winter recalled that the production had budgeted $4 million for the film's effects, slightly more than The Voyage Home. "The first pass", he said, "with all the things [Shatner] wanted, was [$5 or $6] million". Combined with Ferren's figures, the film's budget climbed to $33 million. The studio called a meeting with executives and began cutting out effects shots.

To reduce the optical effects workload, Ferren rejected bluescreen compositing, opting instead for rear projection. This cheaper process, he reasoned, would save time, and would make sense for elements such as the Enterprise's bridge viewer, where compositing would lack the softness of a real transmitted image. Designer Lynda Weinman used a Mac II to create the animatics cut into the film during production, which were eventually replaced by the film's finished effects.

The rock monster climax of the film was ultimately dropped due to difficulties during filming. The monster, dubbed the Rockman, was a large latex rubber suit that breathed fire on command. Effects personnel smoked cigarettes and blew smoke into the suit's tubing, loading it with smoke that it would slowly emit, obscuring some obvious rubber parts. On the last day of location shooting, the Rockman began suffering mechanical problems; the suit stopped breathing fire, and the desert wind dissipated the smoke. The result, Shatner wrote, was that "our guy in the silly rubber suit ultimately just looked like ... well, a guy in a silly rubber suit." With no time to return to the location, Shatner was forced to get wide shots and hope that the setting could be reproduced in the studio, but admitted that it was likely not going to work for the film.

Once back at the studio for non-location filming, Shatner and Ferren met to discuss how to replace the Rockman. The agreed-upon idea was an "amorphous blob of light and energy" that would rise up and chase after Kirk, shape-shifting while in pursuit. The visuals took weeks before they were ready to be shown after the completion of principal photography. When Shatner saw the effects, however, he was extremely disappointed with the low quality. Bennett and Shatner attempted to get money to reshoot the final scenes of the film, but Paramount turned them down.

ILM delivered the main Enterprise model, which was built by Magicam in 1978 for Star Trek: The Motion Picture, to Associates and Ferren. However, scenes which included the Enterprise in the Earth-orbiting Spacedock platform, as well as the Spacedock itself, were taken directly from ILM's previous work in Star Trek IV: The Voyage Home. The Enterprise model had been damaged when it was loaned out for touring purposes, meaning the 30,000 panels on the model had to be repainted by hand. While production wrapped, Ferren continued work on the miniatures and other optical effects at his New Jersey studio. The opticals were completed in Manhattan before being sent west; for example, bluescreen footage of the motion controlled miniatures was filmed in Hoboken, New Jersey. In New York, the blue screen was replaced by a moving starfield—a single finished shot of a ship moving through space required as many as fifty pieces of film. The Great Barrier effects were created using chemicals, which were dropped into a large water tank to create swirls and other reactions. The "God column", in which the false god appeared, was created by a rapidly rotating cylinder through which light was shone; the result appeared on film as a column of light. Ferren used a beam splitter to project actor George Murdock's head into the cylinder, giving the appearance that the false god resided within the column.

=== Editing ===
Days after filming was completed, Shatner returned to Paramount to supervise the film's edit, soundscape creation and score, and integration of optical effects. Editor Peter E. Berger had already assembled rough cuts of various sequences, and with only weeks before the film's scheduled completion, the production team set about the task of salvaging the film's ending through editing. The false god's screen time was reduced, and Ferren's "god blob" effect was replaced with a closeup of the actor's face, along with shots of lightning and smoke. At the time, Shatner felt that the edits "pulled a rabbit out of a hat", solving many of the film's problems.

Shatner's cut ran slightly over two hours (not including end credits or the opticals), which Paramount thought was too long. Their target runtime was one hour forty-five minutes, which would guarantee twice-nightly theatrical screenings. Bennett was handed the task of shortening the film's running time, despite Shatner's view that nothing could possibly be removed. Shatner was horrified by Bennett's edit, and the two haggled over what parts to restore or cut.

In early test screenings, the film received negative reviews. Of the first test audience, only a small portion considered the film "excellent", a rating that most other Star Trek films had enjoyed. Segments of the film were re-edited for the theatrical release. Five minutes of footage was excised to improve the film's pacing, and an additional scene was included on the Bird-of-Prey to make the circumstances of Kirk's rescue clearer. The second screening, with the final effects and sound in place, received much better reviews.

== Audio ==
=== Music ===
Music critic Jeff Bond wrote that Shatner made "at least two wise decisions" in making The Final Frontier; beyond choosing Laurence Luckinbill as Sybok, he hired Jerry Goldsmith to compose the film's score. Goldsmith had written the Academy Award-nominated score for Star Trek: The Motion Picture, and the new Trek film was an opportunity to craft music with a similar level of ambition while adding action and character—two elements largely missing from The Motion Picture. Goldsmith did not want to accentuate the film's comedy with music, feeling it would "[take] drama to the point of silliness". He focused on the God planet as his most difficult task.

Goldsmith's main theme begins with the traditional opening notes from Alexander Courage's original television series theme; an ascending string and electronic bridge leads to a rendition of the march from The Motion Picture. According to Jeff Bond, Goldsmith's use of The Motion Picture's march led to some confusion among Star Trek: The Next Generation fans, as they were unfamiliar with the music's origins. Another theme from The Motion Picture to make a return appearance is the Klingon theme from the 1979 film's opening scene. Here, the theme is treated in what Bond termed a "Prokofiev-like style as opposed to the avant-garde counterpoint" as seen in The Motion Picture. Goldsmith also added a crying ram's horn.

The breadth of The Final Frontier's locations led Goldsmith to eschew the two-themed approach of The Motion Picture in favor of leitmotifs, recurring music used for locations and characters. Sybok is introduced with a synthesized motif in the opening scene of the film, while when Kirk and Spock discuss him en route to Nimbus III it is rendered in a more mysterious fashion. The motif also appears in the action cue as Kirk and company land on Nimbus III and try to free the hostages. When Sybok boards the Enterprise, a new four-note motif played by low brass highlights the character's obsession. The Sybok theme from then on is used in either a benevolent sense or a more percussive, dark rendition. Arriving at Sha Ka Ree, the planet's five-note theme bears resemblance to Goldsmith's unicorn theme from Legend; "the two melodies represent very similar ideas: lost innocence and the tragic impossibility of recapturing paradise," writes Bond. The music features cellos conveying a pious quality, while the appearance of "God" begins with string glissandos but turns to a dark rendition of Sybok's theme as its true nature is exposed. As the creature attacks Kirk, Spock and McCoy, the more aggressive Sybok theme takes on an attacking rhythm. When Spock appeals to the Klingons for help, the theme takes on a sensitive character before returning to a powerful sequence as the ship destroys the god-creature.

The original soundtrack for the film was first released by Epic Records, and included nine score tracks (mostly out of film order) and the song "The Moon Is a Window to Heaven" by Hiroshima. On November 30, 2010, La-La Land Records reissued the soundtrack in a two-CD edition featuring the film's complete score on the first disc and the original soundtrack album and some alternate cues on the second disc.

=== Sound effects ===
Mark Mangini served as The Final Frontier's sound designer; he had previously worked on The Voyage Home. Because Mangini was concerned about creating continuity within Star Trek's sounds, he decided to reuse some effects rather than create new and different-sounding ones—as such, the Bird-of-Prey's cloak effect, beaming sounds, and the Enterprise engines sound similar to that of past movies. Mangini collaborated with Shatner to work out how the completely new effects would sound. For Sybok's mind melds, Shatner wanted the sounds of beating hearts and breathing.

Mangini was also responsible for the film's foley and dialogue replacement; foley editors created background audio in sync with actions on screen to enrich the soundscape. The sound of Klingons walking, for example, was conveyed with chains and leather for a "rough" sound.

== Themes ==
The Final Frontier appeared amidst several other films that grappled with quests for God and spiritual meaning; author Peter Hansenberg regarded the film as part of an "almost fashionable" trend of 1980s science fiction movies with religious motifs. Regent's Park College professor and Baptist minister Larry Kreitzer argues the film was "deliberately constructed" to raise the issues of God and the Biblical concept of paradise, Eden. Dixie State College professor Ace Pilkington went further, saying that after the "theological preoccupations" of the television series and previous films, "where else can the Enterprise go ... but in quest of God?" Pilkington notes that The Final Frontier has roots in many plots from the series including "The Way to Eden" (which also deals with a brilliant man hijacking the Enterprise to find the place of creation), "The Apple", and "Shore Leave"; a common thread between the paradises described is that they are always "too good to be true". John S. Schultes agrees, pointing out that the idea of paradise has been seen many times in the series, but almost always illusory or deadened.

While many Star Trek episodes dealt with false deities, The Final Frontier is one of the few that, in the words of religious scholar Ross Shepard Kraemer, "intentionally confronted and explored theological questions, including the existence of God." Theologian Larry Kreitzer dubbed it the film most preoccupied with religious ideas. According to the film, centuries in the future, beliefs in Eden persist, even among other alien races such as the Klingons and Romulans. Moreover, the view of God is homogenized—no one disputes Sybok's references to God as a "he". Kreitzer finds that the film's theological interpretation is offered by Kirk's words: "Maybe He [God] is not out there, Bones. Maybe He's right here, in the human heart."

== Release ==
The Final Frontier was expected to be one of the summer's biggest movies and a sure hit, despite its appearing in a market crowded with other sequels and blockbusters such as Indiana Jones and the Last Crusade, Ghostbusters II and Batman. Never before had so many sequels been released at the same time. Analysts expected The Final Frontier to make nearly $200 million.

Marketing included an MS-DOS computer game Star Trek V: The Final Frontier, part of an increasing trend of game tie-ins to movies. J.M. Dillard wrote the film's novelization, which was on The New York Times Best Seller list for four weeks. Paramount sold Star Trek-branded apparel through catalogues, and Kraft made a Star Trek-branded marshmallow dispenser. While Star Trek had a built-in fan market, marketing tie-ins were risky at the time and even high-grossing films could not guarantee success of related merchandise. Unlike other summer blockbusters, Star Trek had no mass-market appeal and no major food or beverage promotions, but sold pins and posters in theaters, bypassing retailers; other merchandise included pins and a pewter statue of Enterprise, designed to appeal to Star Trek's relatively small but loyal group of collectors. Paramount released teaser posters for Star Trek V depicting a cinema seat in outer space with the tagline "Why are they putting seatbelts in theaters this summer?"

In its opening weekend, The Final Frontier was number one at the US box office. Its $17.4 million opening on 2,202 screens beat the $16.8 million total of The Voyage Home and made it the best Star Trek opening weekend to that point and Paramount's biggest opening non-holiday weekend gross. The Voyage Home, however, had played in only 1,349 theaters at a time with lower ticket prices. In its second week The Final Frontier tumbled 58% to make $7.1 million; in its third week it grossed only $3.7 million. It had a wide release of ten weeks, shorter than that of any Star Trek film before it.

The Final Frontier grossed $49,566,330 in the United States and Canada and a global total of $63 million. The season proved to be another record-breaker for the film industry, with domestic summer box-office revenues of $2.05 billion. The Final Frontier was the season's tenth-best-grossing film, although it failed to make expected returns. It and Pink Cadillac were the early summer's biggest box-office disappointments.

== Reception ==
The Final Frontier received generally negative reviews from critics. Rob Lowing of The Sun Herald called the film "likeable but average". The Chicago Sun-Times' Roger Ebert and The Washington Post's Rita Kempley panned the film, calling it "a mess" and "a shambles", respectively. The New York Times' Caryn James considered the film to be disappointing to fans and non-fans alike, while Chris Hicks of the Deseret News disagreed, feeling that the film approached issues in the same vein as the television series and that fans would enjoy it. Newsweek's David Ansen and Lowing considered Shatner's direction during action sequences weak with Lowing adding that the second half of the film felt directionless. Hicks wrote that the film's broad humor gave the film an inconsistent tone. In contrast, Chris Dafoe of The Globe and Mail called it "the most intentionally funny" entry in the series. The Christian Science Monitor's David Sterritt stated that at its best, The Final Frontier showed "flashes" of the humor that propelled The Voyage Home, and Lowing deemed Shatner's direction at its best during comedic moments.

Critics judged the principal characters' performances satisfactory; "these veterans know each other's moves so well they've found a neat comic shorthand that gets more laughs out of the lines than they deserve", Ansen wrote. Stan James of The Advertiser wrote that Warner was wasted in his role and most characters lacked any "drive and motivation". In comparison, Luckinbill's Sybok received praise from critics such as USA Today's Mike Clark who wrote that "he has the voice and stature of the golden screen's most scintillating intellectual villains", although he felt that he never seemed threatening or suspenseful. James considered Sybok the most "distinctive, compelling villain" of the series since Khan Noonien Singh (Ricardo Montalbán) in Star Trek II: The Wrath of Khan.

The special effects were generally considered poor. Murphy wrote that the film fell apart after the arrival at Sha Ka Ree, where the "great special effects that graced parts I through IV are nowhere to be seen". Ebert's review agreed saying that the visuals managed to inspire awe ever so briefly before dissolving into "an anticlimactic special effects show with a touch of The Wizard of Oz thrown in for good measure". Kempley wrote the Enterprise's objective was "to pass through an impenetrable (Ha!) swirl of what appears to be cosmic Windex, beyond which is the planet Shockara [sic], home of God, or perhaps California shot through a purple filter".

Bennett blamed part of The Final Frontier's failure on the change from a traditional Thanksgiving-season Star Trek opening to the sequel-stuffed summer release period and the diffusion of Star Trek fan viewership following the premiere of The Next Generation. Winter felt they should have recognized the film's plot was too reminiscent of V'ger from Star Trek: The Motion Picture and that the search for God was a mistake; while he felt many parts of the film were good, they "smoked [their] own press releases" and nearly killed the franchise. Initially, Shatner believed that the film would get a positive response. In the morning after the opening night, he woke Nimoy up to tell him that the Los Angeles Times had given The Final Frontier a positive review. Soon after a local television reporter also gave the film a good review and Shatner recalled that he incorrectly "began sensing a [positive] trend". He later agreed that the film nearly ended the film series and looking back on the film called it a "failed but glorious attempt" at a thought-provoking film that did not come together. Star Trek creator Roddenberry considered elements of this film to be "apocryphal at best", and particularly disliked the idea that Sarek had fathered a child (Sybok) with a Vulcan before Amanda Grayson. Nevertheless, the film is considered canon. Even George Takei expected the film to be a disappointment because "the script seemed rather a muddle ... as if three separately interesting stories force-sealed together into one" which "made for a confusing and ultimately tiresome two hours".

Considered a critical and commercial failure, the poor performance of The Final Frontier jeopardized the production of further Star Trek features. Bennett was given the go-ahead to begin work on his own prequel concept that would have cast new actors to play the main cast at Starfleet Academy. Loughery worked with Bennett on a story inspired by Santa Fe Trail. When Paramount president Ned Tanen resigned, support for Bennett's prequel idea evaporated. Paramount instead wanted another film with the original cast and Bennett decided to leave the franchise. Winter remained with the production and The Wrath of Khan director Nicholas Meyer returned to direct Star Trek VI: The Undiscovered Country, the last movie starring the entire original cast.

At the 10th Golden Raspberry Awards, The Final Frontier was nominated for Worst Picture, Worst Director, Worst Actor for Shatner, Worst Supporting Actor for Kelley, Worst Screenplay and Worst Picture of the Decade, winning three (Picture, Director, and Actor).

On review aggregator Rotten Tomatoes, the film has an approval rating of 22% based on 54 reviews, with an average rating of 3.90/10. The site's consensus states: "Filled with dull action sequences and an underdeveloped storyline, Star Trek V: The Final Frontier is probably the worst of the series." On Metacritic, it has a weighted average score of 43 out of 100 based on 16 reviews, indicating "mixed or average reviews". Audiences surveyed by CinemaScore gave the film a grade "A−" on scale of A to F.

== Home media ==
The film was released on VHS, pan-and-scan LaserDisc and Betamax on December 21, 1989. The video was among the top-selling videocassettes for weeks after its release, and it enjoyed a resurgence in popularity in the months leading to the release of its sequel; it was Paramount's top-selling title in the third quarter of 1991. A LaserDisc version of the film was released by Pioneer LDCA; The Final Frontier was the 21st-best-selling title for the platform in 1990.

The film was released on DVD-Video on April 20, 1999, as a bare-bones edition with no bonus extras. It was re-released on DVD as a 2-Disc Special Collector's Edition on October 14, 2003, with extras added, including footage of the principal photography wrap press conference, an interview with Shatner the day before filming began, a retrospective documentary and a commentary track by Shatner and his daughter Liz.

Paramount released The Final Frontier Blu-ray Disc in May 2009 to coincide with the release of J. J. Abrams' Star Trek, along with the other five films featuring the original crew, packaged as Star Trek: Original Motion Picture Collection. The Final Frontier was remastered in 1080p high definition from the 2000 high-definition master prepared for the DVD. All six films in the set have the (then) new 7.1 Dolby TrueHD audio. The disc features a new commentary track by renowned Star Trek authors and contributors Michael and Denise Okuda, Judith and Garfield Reeves-Stevens and Daren Dochterman, as well as the previously recorded commentary track by Shatner and his daughter. Shatner wanted to produce a director's cut of the movie similar to that of Star Trek: The Motion Picture and Star Trek II: The Wrath of Khan—Director's Cut with improved special effects and scenes omitted from the original release; however, he stated in an interview that Paramount would not support the venture.

== See also ==
- Star Trek film series
- List of films featuring space stations

== Bibliography ==
- Altman, Mark (April 1992). "Star Trek VI; the making of 'The Undiscovered Country'". Cinefantastique. 22 (5): 24–55.
- Bond, Jeff (1999). The Music of Star Trek. Lone Eagle Publishing Company. ISBN 1-58065-012-0.
- Dillard, J.M. (1994). Star Trek: "Where No One Has Gone Before" — A History in Pictures. Pocket Books. ISBN 0-671-51149-1.
- Hansenberg, Peter (1997). "The "Religious" In Film: From King of Kings to The Fisher King". In John R. May (ed.). New Image of Religious Film. Rowman & Littlefield. ISBN 1-55612-761-8.
- Hughes, David (2008). The Greatest Science Fiction Movies Never Made. Titan Books. ISBN 978-1-84576-755-6.
- Kraemer, Ross Shepard; William Cassiday; Susan Schwartz (2003). Religions of Star Trek. Basic Books. ISBN 0-8133-4115-9.
- Kreitzer, Larry (1996). "The Cultural Veneer of 'Star Trek'". Journal of Popular Culture. 30 (2): 1–28. doi:10.1111/j.0022-3840.1996.165468.x.
- Kreitzer, Larry (1999). "Suffering, Sacrifice and Redemption: Biblical Imagery in Star Trek". In Porter, Jennifer; Darcee McLaren (eds.). Star Trek and Sacred Ground: Explorations of Star Trek, Religion, and American Culture. State University of New York Press. ISBN 0-7914-4334-5.
- Mandell, Paul (May 1990). "Star Trek V: Sharing the Pain". Cinefex (42): 47–67. ISSN 0198-1056.
- Pilkington, Ace (April 1996). "Star Trek V: The Search for God". Literature/Film Quarterly. 24 (2). ISSN 0090-4260.
- Reeves-Stevens, Judith and Garfield (1995). The Art of Star Trek. Pocket Books. ISBN 0-671-89804-3.
- Prince, Stephen (2000). "The Industry at the Dawn of the Decade". In Harpole, Charles (ed.). A New Pot of Gold: Hollywood Under the Electronic Rainbow, 1980–1989. History of the American Cinema. Vol. 10. Charles Scribner's Sons. ISBN 0-684-80493-X.
- Schultes, John S (October 2003). "Are There Any Gods Out There? Perceptions of Religion from Star Wars to Star Trek". Journal of Religion and Film. 7 (2).
- Shatner, Lisabeth (1989). Captains' Log: William Shatner's Personal Account of the Making of Star Trek V: The Final Frontier. Pocket Books. ISBN 0-671-68652-6.
- Shatner, William and Elizabeth (October 23, 2003). Star Trek V: The Final Frontier, Special Collector's Edition: Audio commentary (DVD; Disc 1/2). Paramount Pictures.
- Shatner, William; Kris Kreski (1994). Star Trek Movie Memories (1st ed.). HarperCollins. ISBN 0-06-017617-2.
- Star Trek cast and crew (October 23, 2003). Star Trek V: The Final Frontier, Special Collector's Edition: Special Features: "The Star Trek Universe ('That Klingon Couple'); Production 'Harve Bennett's Pitch'; 'The Journey'; 'Makeup Tests'; 'Pre-Visualization Models'; 'Rockman In the Raw'; 'Star Trek V Press Conference' " (DVD; Disc 2/2). Paramount Pictures.
- Teitelbaum, Sheldon (December 1991). "Harve Bennett, Movie Paradise Lost". Cinefantastique. 22 (3): 15–18.
- "Star Trek V: The Final Frontier". Star Trek Database. CBS Entertainment. 2010. Archived from the original on July 3, 2011.
- Takei, George (1994). To the Stars: The Autobiography of George Takei, Star Trek's Mr. Sulu. Pocket Books. ISBN 0-671-89008-5.
