= Music of Star Trek V: The Final Frontier =

Star Trek V: The Final Frontier is a 1989 science fiction film directed by William Shatner based on the television series Star Trek: The Original Series and the fifth film in the Star Trek film series. Jerry Goldsmith composed the film's musical score after he did the same for Star Trek: The Motion Picture (1979) which was nominated for an Academy Award. The score was positively received, unlike the film, which received mixed reviews.

== Background ==
Shatner wanted to hire Jerry Goldsmith to compose music for The Final Frontier so that he could craft the film's music with the similar level of ambition while adding action and character, two elements largely missing from the first film's score. Goldsmith did not want to accentuate the film's comedy with music, feeling it would "[take] drama to the point of silliness". He focused on the God planet as his most difficult task.

As he did with The Motion Picture, Goldsmith referenced Alexander Courage's original television series theme in the main theme's opening notes that in-turn references a rendition of the march from that film. He also reused the Klingon theme with an addition of a crying ram horn, which music critic Jeff Bond opined that it is treated with a "Prokofiev-like style as opposed to the avant-garde counterpoint" as seen in The Motion Picture. Goldsmith also rescinded his two-themed approach for the first film, in favor of leitmotifs, where recurring music is used for locations and characters.

The score was recorded at the Paramount Stage M in the Record Plant studio in Los Angeles. Goldsmith composed nearly 73 minutes of the dramatic score performed by a 91-piece of the Hollywood Studio Symphony. Recording sessions were held on March 27 and 28, and later on April 10, 11, 14 and 15, at sporadic schedules to make up for the studio availability.

== Track listing ==
=== Original track list ===
Star Trek V: The Final Frontier

Film score by Jerry Goldsmith
- Released: 1989
- Recorded: March 27–April 15, 1989
- Studios: Paramount Stage M, Record Plant, Los Angeles; Digital Magnetics, Los Angeles
- Genre: Film score
- Length: 41:57
- Label: Epic
- Producer: Jerry Goldsmith

Jerry Goldsmith chronology
Warlock (1989)	Star Trek V: The Final Frontier (1989)	Total Recall (1990)

The original soundtrack for the film was released by Epic Records and included nine score tracks and the song "The Moon Is a Window to Heaven" by Hiroshima.

No.	Title	Length
1.	"The Mountain"	3:50
2.	"The Barrier"	2:50
3.	"Without Help"	4:18
4.	"A Busy Man"	4:40
5.	"Open The Gates"	2:59
6.	"An Angry God"	6:55
7.	"Let's Get Out Of Here"	5:12
8.	"Free Minds"	3:17
9.	"Life Is A Dream"	3:56
10.	"The Moon's A Window To Heaven" (Hiroshima)	4:00
Total length:		41:57

=== Expanded edition ===
Star Trek V: The Final Frontier (Expanded Edition)

Film score by Jerry Goldsmith
- Released: November 30, 2010 (first issue); May 15, 2012 (second issue)
- Genre: Film score
- Length: 132:53 (first issue); 126:38 (second issue)
- Labels: La-La Land (first issue); Intrada (second issue)
- Producer: Jerry Goldsmith

On November 30, 2010, La-La Land Records reissued the soundtrack in a double CD edition limited to 5,000 units, featuring the film's complete score on the first disc and the original 1989 soundtrack album as well as some alternate cues on the second disc. It was again issued by Intrada Records and released on May 15, 2012, with the only difference being the change in the album duration.

Disc 1
No.	Title	Length
1.	"Nimbus III"	2:04
2.	"The Mind-Meld"	2:47
3.	"The Mountain" (main title)	4:56
4.	"The Big Drop"	0:27
5.	"Raid on Paradise"	2:46
6.	"Not Alone"	1:12
7.	"Target Practice"	1:54
8.	"A Tall Ship"	1:45
9.	"Plot Course"	1:49
10.	"No Harm"	2:16
11.	"Approaching Nimbus III"	3:02
12.	"Open the Gates"	3:04
13.	"Well Done"	1:17
14.	"Without Help"	4:58
15.	"Pick It Up"	2:34
16.	"No Authority"	0:32
17.	"It Exists"	1:49
18.	"Free Minds"	3:20
19.	"The Birth"	3:56
20.	"The Barrier"	2:55
21.	"A Busy Man"	4:44
22.	"An Angry God"	7:00
23.	"Let's Get Out of Here" (part 1)	3:45
24.	"Let's Get Out of Here" (part 2)	3:10
25.	"Cosmic Thoughts"	1:17
26.	"Life Is a Dream" (end credits)	3:58
Total length:		73:17

Disc 2
No.	Title	Length
1.	"The Mountain"	3:54
2.	"The Barrier"	2:54
3.	"Without Help"	4:22
4.	"A Busy Man"	4:43
5.	"Open The Gates"	3:03
6.	"An Angry God"	7:00
7.	"Let's Get Out Of Here"	5:16
8.	"Free Minds"	3:20
9.	"Life Is A Dream"	4:00
10.	"The Moon's A Window To Heaven"	4:05
11.	"The Mountain" (main title) (alternate)	4:48
12.	"A Busy Man" (alternate)	4:43
13.	"Paradise Saloon" (source)	2:45
14.	"The Moon's A Window To Heaven" (film version)	1:12
15.	"Vulcan Song / Row, Row, Row Your Boat" (source)	1:37
16.	"Synclavier Effects"	1:54
Total length:		59:36

== Reception ==
Christian Clemmensen of Filmtracks reviewed "The Final Frontier is a very strong score with highlights not be missed." Craig Lysy of Movie Music UK wrote "In Star Trek V we participate in a religious quest and so Goldsmith provides us with music that is more intimate, warm and contemplative than his iconic Star Trek I score." In a mixed review, Jason Ankeny of AllMusic wrote "For all of its complexity and craft, Star Trek V doesn't reinvent Goldsmith's earlier soundtrack so much as it refines it." Chris Bumbray of JoBlo.com described it as "a good score by Jerry Goldsmith, who returns to the series for the first time since Star Trek: The Motion Picture." Joshua M. Patton of Comic Book Resources called it as "a timeless, beautiful score by legendary composer Jerry Goldsmith".

== Bibliography ==
- Bond, Jeff (1999). The Music of Star Trek. Lone Eagle Publishing Company. ISBN 1-58065-012-0.
- Shatner, William; Kreski, Kris (1994). Star Trek Movie Memories (1st ed.). HarperCollins. ISBN 0-06-017617-2.
