= The Star Trek Encyclopedia =

Star Trek reference book by the Okudas and Mirek

- Cover of Version 3.0
- Author: Michael Okuda, Denise Okuda, Debbie Mirek
- Illustrator: Doug Drexler
- Language: English
- Subject: Star Trek
- Genre: Reference encyclopedia
- Published: 1994 (1st edition)
- Publisher: Pocket Books
- Publication place: United States
- Media type: Hardback, Paperback, CD ROM editions
- Pages: 396
- ISBN: 0671869051 (1st edition)
- OCLC: 30144117

The Star Trek Encyclopedia: A Reference Guide to the Future is a 1994 encyclopedia of in-universe information from the Star Trek television series and films. It was written by Michael Okuda and Denise Okuda, who were production staff on Star Trek: The Next Generation, Star Trek: Deep Space Nine and Star Trek: Voyager, and Debbie Mirek. It was illustrated by Doug Drexler.

== Overview ==
The Encyclopedia features highly detailed information about characters, planets, technologies and ships of the Star Trek franchise as well as brief episode and film synopses. It is organised alphabetically and is replete with illustrations, many of which are in color in later editions.

The Encyclopedia mostly covers material from the Star Trek television series and the Star Trek motion pictures. It is an officially licensed publication and includes some completely original information not included in any Star Trek movie or television episode. According to Gene Roddenberry, television series and the films are the extent of the Star Trek canon.

Some entries in the Encyclopedia contain behind-the-scenes information, presented in italicized text.

Unlike the Star Trek: The Next Generation Technical Manual, the Encyclopedia makes no detailed speculations about Star Trek technology.

== Publication history ==
The Encyclopedia was inspired by a previous book by the same writing team, The Star Trek Chronology, which had been directly commissioned by Gene Roddenberry as a way of ensuring continuity on Star Trek. Michael Okuda developed a "worksheet" on which to record episode titles, episode production numbers, stardates, and any new ships, characters or technology.

Four print editions have been published to date, in both hardcover and paperback: the first edition (ISBN 0-671-88684-3) was published in 1994; the second (ISBN 0-671-53607-9) in 1997. The third edition (ISBN 0-671-53609-5), published in 1999, includes material through the end of Star Trek: Deep Space Nine, the fifth season of Star Trek: Voyager, and the movie Star Trek: Insurrection—but as a non-collated addendum. The fourth edition (ISBN 978-0062371324) was published in 2016.

The print version was complemented by a similar electronic version, the Star Trek Omnipedia released in 1995. The CD-ROM medium allowed the Simon & Schuster publishers to include video clips. It was released for both Windows and Macintosh (ISBN 0-684-87413-X), which was published by Simon & Schuster Interactive. This was the only version of the encyclopedia not to be published by Pocket Books. Paramount Pictures is the owner of the copyright. AllGame gave the PC version of Omnipedia a score of 3.5 out of 5, saying: "By far, one of the most appealing aspects, other than the information, is Majel Barret's voice." The Mac version received a score of 4 out of 5, concluding: "While not a multimedia extravaganza, Star Trek Omnipedia contains enough information to make a devoted Trekkie or Trekker deliriously happy."

== Fourth edition ==
In the years since its 1999 publication, the Encyclopedia gradually became extremely out of date, containing no information from subsequent Star Trek films (Star Trek: Nemesis, Star Trek, Star Trek Into Darkness), the last two seasons of Star Trek: Voyager or Star Trek: Enterprise. There had long been no plans to release an updated version of the Encyclopedia, as it had been superseded by online resources such as the wiki-based encyclopedia Memory Alpha.

During the August 2015 annual Star Trek convention in Las Vegas, an updated version of the Encyclopedia was announced for publication in 2016, the 50th Anniversary of Star Trek. The total pages for this updated version is 1,056 pages. It was announced that the updated version would have "300 new pages" and cover Star Trek: Voyager Seasons 4–7, Star Trek: Enterprise Seasons 1–4, Star Trek: Nemesis and would contain information regarding J.J. Abrams' Star Trek movie reboot. The version came out as a "two-volume hardcover edition". The 2016 revised edition was published by Harper Design on October 18, 2016, for $150.

Denise Okuda stated that there is "two, maybe three times as much text in the 2016 edition as in the original, and way more than three times as many photos and illustrations."

== See also ==
- Memory Alpha, a wiki with the aim of producing "the most definitive, accurate and accessible encyclopedic reference for topics related to the canon Star Trek fictional universe."
