= Star Trek: Beyond the Final Frontier =

Documentary film directed by John Logsdon

Star Trek: Beyond the Final Frontier is a 2-hour 2007 television documentary about the 40-year history of Star Trek and an auction of Star Trek props released by Paramount Pictures for an auction by Christie's auction house in New York City. The documentary aired in the United States on February 19, 2007, and March 3, 2007, on the History Channel.

The host is actor Leonard Nimoy, noted for playing Spock in the original series. It explores the decades long history of the Star Trek franchise and its impact on popular culture, with interviews with actors and production staff of the various television shows and movies, and also the auction of props from the series.

== Plot outline ==
The documentary, hosted by actor Leonard Nimoy (Mr. Spock), follows the creation, preparation and final execution of a highly visible live auction of Star Trek props from all five series and movies by auction house Christie's. The documentary starts with a brief overview of the Star Trek series and movies, and Nimoy then describes how Paramount Pictures decided to partner with Christie's to release and sell a multitude of valuable Star Trek props to the general public to celebrate the 40-year anniversary. Over the course of the documentary, we follow Star Trek experts Michael Okuda and Denise Okuda as they peruse a big warehouse and uncover a variety of Star Trek props ranging from models of the ships, costumes worn by cast from all series as well as other things such as weapons, tricorders and masks. Intertwined in this documentary are short sections of interviews with notable cast and crew members such as Patrick Stewart, Nichelle Nichols and Rick Berman that describe the history of Star Trek, its cultural impact and Star Trek creator Gene Roddenberry's vision. In the later part of the documentary, we follow how staff members of Christie's prepare the selected props, photograph them for an auction catalog, display selected pieces at a Star Trek convention in Las Vegas before they are finally being auctioned off in New York over a period of three days. The documentary ends with house-visits of a few of the high-winning bidders as they proudly show off their recently acquired items.

In the interviews, cast and writer producers were noted for being impressed by the franchise's longevity and how much they loved those they worked with.

== Cast ==
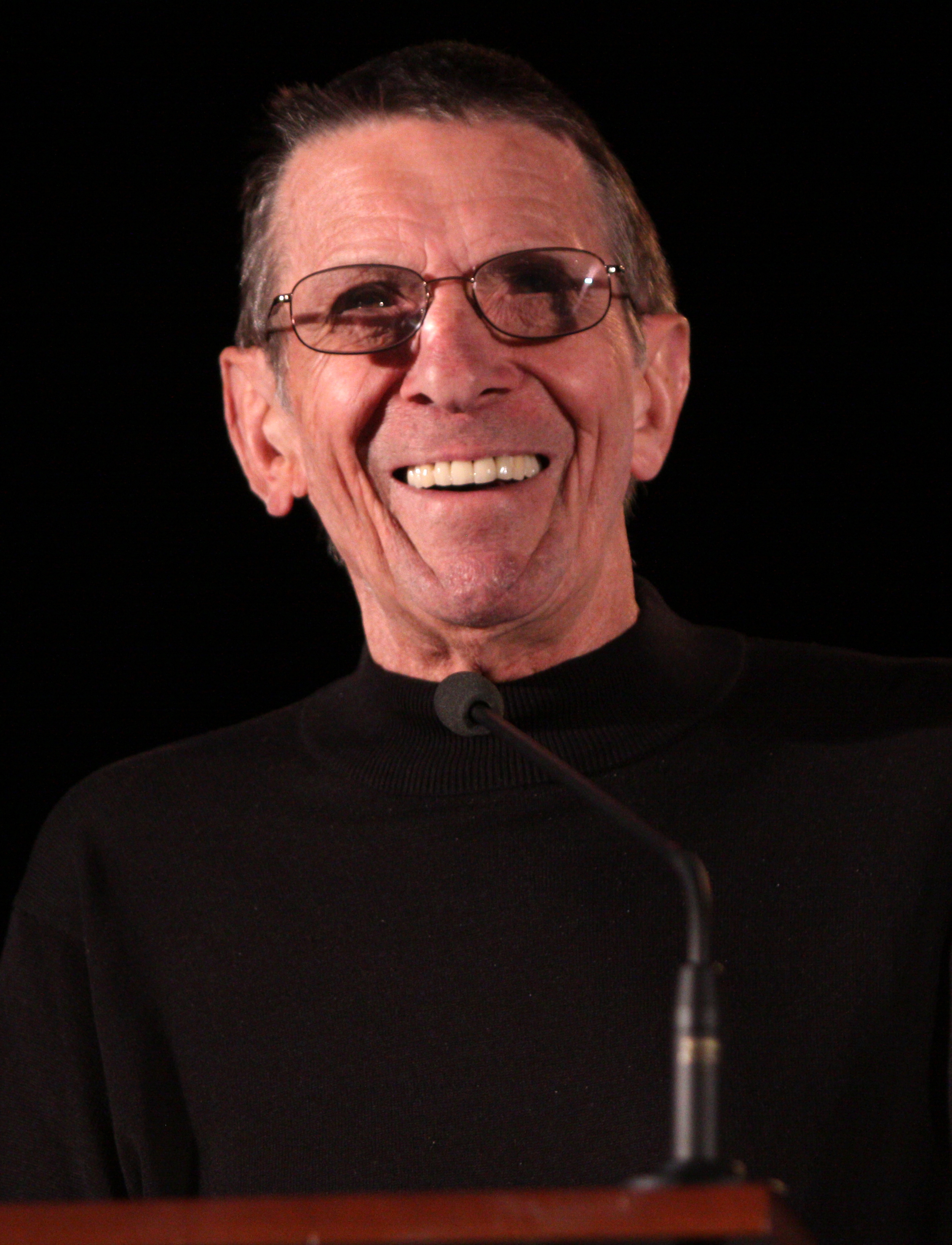
The documentary was hosted by Leonard Nimoy.

- Leonard Nimoy (Host)
- George Takei
- Nichelle Nichols
- Rick Berman
- Patrick Stewart
- Jonathan Frakes
- Marina Sirtis
- Garrett Wang
- Avery Brooks
- Brannon Braga
- Michael Okuda
- Denise Okuda
- Armin Shimerman
- Herman F. Zimmerman
- Robert Blackman
- Kate Mulgrew
- Michael Westmore

== Broadcast and releases ==
Star Trek: Beyond the Final Frontier aired on what was then known as "The History Channel" on Monday, Feb. 19, 2007 at 9 p.m.

The feature was included on the season one HD DVD box set of Star Trek: The Original Series. The documentary was included in the DVD component of the set not the HD portion.

== Reception ==
In 2007, The Hollywood Reporter called it "fascinating" and a comprehensive overview of the interest in popular culture in Star Trek at that time. In 2007, Variety noted the focus on various aspects of the auction, interviews, and highlighted Nichols' quote, calling the fan base "Human beings of great quality".
