= Rekall =

Rekall may refer to:

- Rekall (software), a database front-end
- Rekall (musician) (Kris Gale), an electronic musician
- Fictional company in the Philip K. Dick story "We Can Remember It for You Wholesale"
- Rekall Incorporated, a company in Total Recall, its remake, and Total Recall 2070

== See also ==
- Recall (disambiguation)
