= Recall =

Recall may refer to:

- Recall (baseball), a baseball term
- Recall (bugle call), a signal to stop
- Recall (information retrieval), a statistical measure
- ReCALL (journal), an academic journal about computer-assisted language learning
- Recall (memory)
- Recall (Overwatch), a 2016 animated short
- The Recall, a 2017 Canadian-American film
- Recall election, a procedure by which voters can remove an elected official
- Letter of recall, sent to return an ambassador from a country
- Windows Recall, a Windows 11 feature
- Product recall, a request by a business to return a product
- Recalled (film), a South Korean mystery thriller film
- "Recall", a song by Susumu Hirasawa on the 1995 album Sim City
- Recall, UK term for hook flash
- Precision and recall as data performance metrics
- In the United Kingdom, recall to prison of a prisoner released on parole

== See also ==
- Perfect recall (disambiguation)
- Total recall (disambiguation)
- Remember (disambiguation)
- Recalled to Life (disambiguation)

__EXPECTSHORTPAGE__
