= Total Recall (2012 soundtrack) =

2012 film soundtrack album

Total Recall (Original Motion Picture Soundtrack)

Film score by Harry Gregson-Williams
- Released: July 31, 2012
- Recorded: 2011–2012
- Studio: Abbey Road Studios, London; Wavecrest Studios, Venice, Los Angeles
- Genre: Film score
- Length: 56:22
- Label: Madison Gate Records
- Producer: Harry Gregson-Williams

Harry Gregson-Williams chronology
I Am Bad (2012)	Total Recall (2012)	The East (2013)

Total Recall (Original Motion Picture Soundtrack) is the film score to the 2012 film Total Recall directed by Len Wiseman which is an adaptation of the 1990 film of the same name, starring Colin Farrell, Kate Beckinsale and Jessica Biel. The album featured original score composed by Harry Gregson-Williams and was released through Madison Gate Records on July 31, 2012.

== Background and development ==
In November 2011, Gregson-Williams stated in an interview to Film Score Monthly that he would be composing music for Total Recall, where he considered the film's music to be much different from Jerry Goldsmith's score for the 1990 film. Wiseman wanted the score that did not sound too traditional or action filled, which Gregson-Williams understood and provided a score that was "big and epic but it's also dark and moody". The score heavily utilized electronic elements for the futuristic, science fiction atmosphere. The British electronic music duo Hybrid (Mike and Charlotte Truman) was assigned to write additional music and wrote 50 minutes of music in the span of four months.

== Release ==
The score was released through Madison Gate Records on July 31, 2012.

== Reception ==
James Southall of Movie Wave wrote "At almost an hour, the album's twice as long as it needs to be, but it's better than a lot of people would have you believe – just a shame that (in common with almost all music for similar films of the last decade or so) it couldn't be bolder in its convictions and less afraid to play a leading role, not just a supporting one." Filmtracks wrote "For 1990's Total Recall, Goldsmith did just that, writing music that was based upon familiar symphonic tones and rhythms to compensate for the outrageously bizarre story. As such, you cared about the characters and the people of Mars. There was gripping awe in his cues, the type of majesty that forces filmmakers to place the music at the forefront of the mix for lengthy periods of time during key special effects shots. Conversely, 2012's Total Recall doesn't afford a composer like Gregson-Williams any such opportunity, nor does he make overt gestures of emotional connectivity throughout the score to help the audience care about the characters."

Dylan Chester of The Film Stage found it to be "the dullest action film score in recent memory, from Harry Gregson-Williams." Chris Bumbray of JoBlo.com called it "a shockingly generic score by the usually excellent Harry Gregson-Williams, which- suffice to say, doesn't hold a candle to Jerry Goldsmith's incredible soundtrack for the original." In contrast, Critic based at Coventry Telegraph called it a "bombastic score". Brad Brevet of Comingsoon.net wrote "Harry Gregson Williams provides a pounding score that dominates most of the film".

== Track listing ==
No.	Title	Length
1.	"The Dream"	3:35
2.	"The Fall"	2:11
3.	"Colony"	1:56
4.	"The Tripping Den"	2:50
5.	"Rekall"	2:51
6.	"Rooftop Chase"	2:23
7.	"Hand Call"	2:50
8.	"The Vault"	4:50
9.	"Customs"	1:40
10.	"Car Chase Pt. 1"	2:44
11.	"Car Chase Pt. 2"	1:34
12.	"The Key"	1:24
13.	"The Scar On Your Hand"	4:15
14.	"Elevator Chase"	5:21
15.	"Train To Matthias"	4:03
16.	"Saving Melina"	2:35
17.	"Gravity Reversing"	2:19
18.	"Up Top Fight"	2:52
19.	"The Fall Collapses"	1:35
20.	"It's Hard To Believe, Isn't It?"	2:34
Total length:		56:22

== Personnel ==
Credits adapted from liner notes:

- Music composer, producer and piano – Harry Gregson-Williams
- Additional music – Hybrid
- Electric cello – Martin Tillman
- Orchestrators – Alastair King, David Butterworth
- Conductor – Gavin Greenaway
- Leader – Perry Montague Mason
- Contractor – Isobell Griffiths
- Assistant contractor – Jo Buckley
- Programming – Andy Page, Halli Cauthery
- Recording – Peter Cobbin, Sam Odel
- Mixing – Al Clay
- Mastering – Patricia Sullivan
- Score editor – Meri Gavin, Richard Whitfield
- Score technical engineer – Costas Kotselas
- Assistant technical engineer – Brendyn Adams, Danny Stimac
- Executive producer – Neal H. Moritz
- Music coordinator – Tim Ahlering
- Copyist – Jill Streater
- Art direction and design – Elizabeth Prochnow
- Executive in charge of music for Sony Pictures – Lia Vollack

== Accolades ==
Awards	Category	Recipient(s)	Result	Ref.
BMI Film & TV Awards	Film Music Award	Harry Gregson-Williams	Won	
