= Tied Down =

Studio album by Negative Approach
- Released: 1983
- Recorded: August 1983
- Studios: Multi Track Studios, Redford, Michigan
- Genre: Hardcore punk
- Length: 16:53
- Label: Touch and Go
- Producer: Corey Rusk

Negative Approach chronology
Negative Approach (1982)	Tied Down (1983)	Total Recall (1992)

Professional ratings
Review scores
Source	Rating
Allmusic	3/5 stars

Tied Down is the only official studio album by hardcore punk band Negative Approach, released in 1983 by Touch and Go Records.

== Track listing ==
1. "Tied Down" – 1:33
2. "Hypocrite" – 1:47
3. "Evacuate" – 2:35
4. "Said and Done" – 0:50
5. "Nothing" – 2:20
6. "Your Mistake" – 1:48
7. "Live Your Life" – 1:06
8. "Friend or Foe" – 1:12
9. "Dead Stop" – 2:41
10. "I'll Survive" – 1:01

== Personnel ==
=== Negative Approach ===
- John Brannon – vocals
- Rob McCulloch – guitar
- Graham McCulloch – bass
- Chris "OP" Moore – drums

=== Production ===
- Lloyd Grace – engineer
- Corey Rusk – producer

=== Artwork ===
- Marc Barie – photography (back cover)
- Corey Rusk – photography (lyric sheet)
