= Perfect recall =

Perfect recall may refer to:

- Eidetic memory, the ability of perfect memorization
- Hyperthymesia, another condition with extreme memory
- Perfect recall (game theory), a concept from game theory
- Wogan's Perfect Recall, a TV show

== See also ==
- Total recall (disambiguation)
