= Total Recall (Negative Approach album) =

Compilation album by Negative Approach
- Released: September 24, 1992
- Recorded: August 1981 – July 1984
- Genre: Hardcore punk
- Length: 51:20
- Label: Touch and Go

Negative Approach chronology
Tied Down (1983)	Total Recall (1992)	Ready to Fight: Demos, Live and Unreleased 1981-83 (2005)

Professional ratings
Review scores
Source	Rating
Allmusic	4/5 stars

Total Recall is a 1992 compilation album by the American hardcore punk band Negative Approach. It includes everything released by the band at the time, which was "Lost Cause" from the compilation EP Process of Elimination, their 1982 self-titled EP and their 1983 album Tied Down. It also features previously unreleased live and demo tracks.

== Track listing ==
All tracks written by Negative Approach unless noted otherwise

1. "Lost Cause" (0:40)
2. "Can't Tell No One" (1:24)
3. "Sick of Talk" (0:34)
4. "Pressure" (0:14)
5. "Why Be Something That You're Not" (0:40)
6. "Nothing" (1:51)
7. "Fair Warning" (0:37)
8. "Ready to Fight" (1:02)
9. "Lead Song" (1:24)
10. "Whatever I Do" (0:57)
11. "Negative Approach" (0:53)
12. "Tied Down" (1:33)
13. "Hypocrite" (1:47)
14. "Evacuate" (2:34)
15. "Said and Done" (0:49)
16. "Nothing" (2:19)
17. "Your Mistake" (1:47)
18. "Live Your Life" (1:06)
19. "Friend or Foe" (1:11)
20. "Dead Stop" (2:40)
21. "I'll Survive" (1:00)
22. "Can't Tell No One" - (live) (1:19)
23. "What Ever I Do" - (live) (0:56)
24. "Ready to Fight" - (live) (1:04)
25. "Chaos" - (live) (1:32) (Harmer, Hodges, McCourt)
26. "Pressure / Fair Warning" - (live) (0:48)
27. "Lost Cause" - (live) (0:41)
28. "Genocide / Nothing" - (live) (3:38)
29. "Never Surrender" - (live) (1:30)
30. "D.A.B.F." - (live) (0:45)
31. "Said and Done" - (live) (0:59)
32. "Sick of Talk / N.A." - (live) (1:20)
33. "Your Mistake" - (demo) (1:46)
34. "Tied Down" - (demo) (1:33)
35. "I'll Survive" - (demo) (1:01)
36. "Kiss Me Kill Me" - (live) (1:37)
37. "I Got a Right" - (live) (2:35) (The Stooges)
38. "Tunnel Vision" - (live) (3:17)
