= List of Star Trek films =

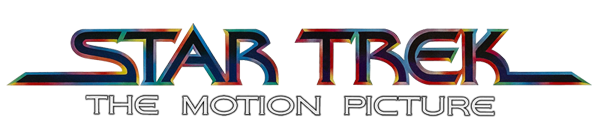
Logo for the first Star Trek film, Star Trek: The Motion Picture (1979)

Star Trek is an American science fiction media franchise that started with a television series (simply called Star Trek but now referred to as Star Trek: The Original Series) created by Gene Roddenberry. The series was first broadcast from 1966 to 1969. Since then, the Star Trek canon has expanded to include many other series, a film franchise, and other media.

The film franchise is produced by Paramount Pictures and began with Star Trek: The Motion Picture in 1979. That film and the five that followed all starred the cast of The Original Series. The seventh film, Star Trek Generations (1994), was designed to serve as a transition from the original cast to that of the next series, Star Trek: The Next Generation. The next three films just starred the cast of The Next Generation, and ended with Star Trek: Nemesis (2002), which disappointed at the box office.

After a break of several years, a new film simply titled Star Trek was released in 2009. It serves as a reboot of the franchise, with new actors portraying younger versions of the Original Series characters, but it is technically a narrative continuation set in an alternate timeline called the "Kelvin Timeline". Two sequels were produced. From 2015 to 2025, several attempts at a fourth reboot film or other continuation were attempted. During that time, the franchise's first television film, Star Trek: Section 31 (2025), was released on the streaming service Paramount+; it is set in the original timeline.

Following the merger of Skydance Media and Paramount Global, the new Paramount Skydance chose not to continue the reboot films. A new feature film is in development as a fresh start for the franchise.

== The Original Series films ==
Star Trek creator Gene Roddenberry first suggested the idea of a Star Trek feature in 1969. When the original television series was cancelled, he lobbied to continue the franchise through a film. The success of the series in syndication convinced the studio to begin work on a feature film in 1975. A series of writers attempted to craft a suitably epic screenplay, but the attempts did not satisfy Paramount, so the studio scrapped the project in 1977. Paramount instead planned on returning the franchise to its roots with a new television series (Phase II ). The massive worldwide box office success of Star Wars in mid-1977 sent Hollywood studios to their vaults in search of similar sci-fi properties that could be adapted or re-launched to the big screen. Following the huge opening of Columbia's Close Encounters of the Third Kind in late December 1977, production of Phase II was cancelled in favor of making a Star Trek film.

Star Trek: The Original Series films
Film	U.S. release date	Directed by	Screenplay by	Story by	Produced by
Star Trek: The Motion Picture	December 7, 1979	Robert Wise	Harold Livingston	Alan Dean Foster	Gene Roddenberry
Star Trek II: The Wrath of Khan	June 4, 1982	Nicholas Meyer	Jack B. Sowards	Harve Bennett and Jack B. Sowards	Robert Sallin
Star Trek III: The Search for Spock	June 1, 1984	Leonard Nimoy	Harve Bennett	Harve Bennett	Harve Bennett
Star Trek IV: The Voyage Home	November 26, 1986	Leonard Nimoy	Steve Meerson, Peter Krikes, Nicholas Meyer and Harve Bennett	Harve Bennett and Leonard Nimoy	Harve Bennett
Star Trek V: The Final Frontier	June 9, 1989	William Shatner	David Loughery	William Shatner, Harve Bennett and David Loughery	Harve Bennett
Star Trek VI: The Undiscovered Country	December 6, 1991	Nicholas Meyer	Nicholas Meyer and Denny Martin Flinn	Leonard Nimoy, Lawrence Konner and Mark Rosenthal	Ralph Winter and Steven-Charles Jaffe

=== Star Trek: The Motion Picture (1979) ===
A massive energy cloud from deep space heads toward Earth, leaving destruction in its wake, and the Enterprise must intercept it to determine what lies within, and what its intent might be.

The movie borrows many elements from "The Changeling" of the original series and "One of Our Planets Is Missing" from the animated series. Principal photography commenced on August 7, 1978 with director Robert Wise helming the feature. The production encountered difficulties and slipped behind schedule, with effects team Robert Abel and Associates proving unable to handle the film's large amount of effects work. Douglas Trumbull was hired and given a blank check to complete the effects work in time and location; the final cut of the film was completed just in time for the film's premiere. The film introduced an upgrade to the technology and starship designs, making for a dramatic visual departure from the original series. Many of the set elements created for Phase II were adapted and enhanced for use in the first feature films. It received mixed reviews from critics; while it grossed $139 million the price tag had climbed to about $45 million due to costly effects work and delays.

=== Star Trek II: The Wrath of Khan (1982) ===
Khan Noonien Singh (Ricardo Montalbán), whom Kirk thwarted in his attempt to seize control of the Enterprise fifteen years earlier ("Space Seed"), seeks his revenge on the Admiral and lays a cunning and sinister trap.

The Motion Picture's gross was considered disappointing, but it was enough for Paramount to back a sequel with a reduced budget. After Roddenberry pitched a film in which the crew of the Enterprise goes back in time to ensure the assassination of John F. Kennedy, he was "kicked upstairs" to a ceremonial role while Paramount brought in television producer Harve Bennett to craft a better—and cheaper—film than the first. After watching all the television episodes, Bennett decided that the character Khan Noonien Singh was the perfect villain for the new film. Director Nicholas Meyer finished a complete screenplay in just twelve days, and did everything possible within budget to give The Wrath of Khan a nautical, swashbuckling feel, which he described as "Horatio Hornblower in outer space". Upon release, the reception of The Wrath of Khan was highly positive; Entertainment Weekly's Marc Bernardin called The Wrath of Khan "the film that, by most accounts, saved Star Trek as we know it".

Both the first and second films have television versions with additional footage and alternate takes that affect the storyline. (Subsequent Star Trek films tended to have shorter television versions.) Especially notable in The Wrath of Khan is the footage establishing that a young crew member who acts courageously and dies during an attack on the Enterprise is Scotty's nephew.

=== Star Trek III: The Search for Spock (1984) ===
The plot picks up shortly after the conclusion of the previous film. When McCoy begins acting irrationally, Kirk learns that Spock, in his final moments, transferred his katra, his living spirit, to the doctor. To save McCoy from emotional ruin, Kirk and crew steal the Enterprise and violate the quarantine of the Genesis Planet to retrieve Spock, his body regenerated by the rapidly dying planet itself, in the hope that body and soul can be rejoined. However, bent on obtaining the secret of Genesis for themselves, a renegade Klingon (Christopher Lloyd) and his crew interfere, with deadly consequences.

Meyer declined to return for this film, so directing duties were given to cast member Leonard Nimoy. Paramount gave Bennett the green light to write Star Trek III the day after The Wrath of Khan opened. The producer penned a resurrection story for Spock that built on threads from the previous film and the original series episode "Amok Time".

=== Star Trek IV: The Voyage Home (1986) ===
While returning to stand court-martial for their actions in rescuing Spock, Kirk and crew learn that Earth is under siege by a giant probe that is transmitting a destructive signal, attempting to communicate with the now-extinct species of humpback whales. To save the planet, the crew must time-travel back to the late 20th century to obtain a mating pair of these whales.

Nimoy returned as director for this film. Nimoy and Bennett wanted a film with a lighter tone that did not have a classic antagonist. They decided on a time travel story with the Enterprise crew returning to their past to retrieve something to save their present—eventually, humpback whales. After having been dissatisfied with the script written by Daniel Petrie Jr., Paramount hired Meyer to rewrite the screenplay with Bennett's help. Meyer drew upon his own time travel story Time After Time for elements of the screenplay. Star William Shatner was promised his turn as director for Star Trek V, and Nicholas Meyer returned as director/co-writer for Star Trek VI.

=== Star Trek V: The Final Frontier (1989) ===
Spock's half-brother (Laurence Luckinbill) believes he is summoned by God, and hijacks the brand-new (and problem-ridden) Enterprise-A to take it through the Great Barrier, at the center of the Milky Way, beyond which he believes his maker waits for him. Meanwhile, a young and arrogant Klingon captain (Todd Bryant), seeking glory in what he views as an opportunity to avenge his people of the deaths of their crewmen on Genesis, sets his sights on Kirk.

This is the only Star Trek film directed by William Shatner.

=== Star Trek VI: The Undiscovered Country (1991) ===
When Qo'noS' moon Praxis (the Klingon Empire's chief energy source) is devastated by an explosion, caused by over-mining, the catastrophe also contaminating Qo'noS' atmosphere, the Klingons make peace overtures to the Federation. While on the way to Earth for a peace summit, the Klingon Chancellor (David Warner) is assassinated by Enterprise crewmen, and Kirk and McCoy are held accountable by the Chancellor's Chief of Staff (Christopher Plummer) and sentenced to life on a prison planet. Spock attempts to prove Kirk's innocence, but in doing so, uncovers a massive conspiracy against the peace process with participants from both sides.

This film is a sendoff to the original series cast. One Next Generation cast member, Michael Dorn, appears as the grandfather of the character he plays in the later television series, Worf. It is the second and last Star Trek film directed by Nicholas Meyer and last screenplay co-authored by Leonard Nimoy.

== The Next Generation films ==
The seventh film acted as a transition between the films featuring the original cast and those with the Next Generation cast. The Next Generation cast made four films over a period of eight years, with the last two performing only moderately well (Insurrection) and disappointingly (Nemesis) at the box office. Film titles of the North American and UK releases of the films no longer contained the number of the film following the sixth film (the sixth was Star Trek VI: The Undiscovered Country but the seventh was Star Trek Generations). However, European releases continued using numbers in the film titles until Nemesis.

Star Trek: The Next Generation films
Film	U.S. release date	Directed by	Screenplay by	Story by	Produced by
Star Trek Generations	November 18, 1994	David Carson	Ronald D. Moore and Brannon Braga	Rick Berman, Brannon Braga and Ronald D. Moore	Rick Berman
Star Trek: First Contact	November 22, 1996	Jonathan Frakes	Brannon Braga and Ronald D. Moore	Rick Berman, Brannon Braga and Ronald D. Moore	Rick Berman
Star Trek: Insurrection	December 11, 1998	Jonathan Frakes	Michael Piller	Rick Berman and Michael Piller	Rick Berman
Star Trek: Nemesis	December 13, 2002	Stuart Baird	John Logan	John Logan, Rick Berman and Brent Spiner	Rick Berman

=== Star Trek Generations (1994) ===
Picard enlists the help of Kirk, who is presumed long dead but flourishes in an extra-dimensional realm, to prevent a deranged scientist (Malcolm McDowell) from destroying a star and its populated planetary system in an attempt to enter that realm. This film also included original crew members Scotty (James Doohan) and Chekov (Walter Koenig).

Following seven seasons of The Next Generation, the next Star Trek film was the first to feature the crew of the Enterprise-D, along with a long prologue sequence featuring three cast members of the original series and the only appearance of the Enterprise-B.

=== Star Trek: First Contact (1996) ===
After a failed attempt to assault Earth, the Borg attempt to prevent First Contact between Humans and Vulcans by interfering with Zefram Cochrane's (James Cromwell) warp test in the past. Picard must confront the demons which stem from his assimilation into the Collective ("The Best of Both Worlds") as he leads the new Enterprise-E back through time to ensure the test and subsequent meeting with the Vulcans take place.

The first of two films directed by series actor Jonathan Frakes.

=== Star Trek: Insurrection (1998) ===
Profoundly disturbed by what he views as a blatant violation of the Prime Directive, Picard deliberately interferes with a Starfleet admiral's (Anthony Zerbe) plan to relocate a relatively small but seemingly immortal population from a mystical planet to gain control of the planet's natural radiation, which has been discovered to have substantial medicinal properties. However, the admiral himself is a pawn in his alien partner's (F. Murray Abraham) mission of vengeance.

Insurrection brought in Deep Space Nine writer Michael Piller instead of Ronald D. Moore and Brannon Braga who had written for Generations and First Contact.

=== Star Trek: Nemesis (2002) ===
A clone of Picard (Tom Hardy), created by the Romulans, assassinates the Romulan Senate, assumes absolute power, and lures Picard and the Enterprise to Romulus under the false pretext of a peace overture.

Written by John Logan and directed by Stuart Baird, this film was a critical and commercial failure (released December 13, 2002, in direct competition with Die Another Day, Harry Potter and the Chamber of Secrets and The Lord of the Rings: The Two Towers) and was the final Star Trek film to feature the Next Generation cast and to be produced by Rick Berman.

== Reboot (Kelvin Timeline) films ==
Logo for the reboot films

Despite development on an eleventh film beginning after Nemesis was released, the poor reception to that film and a sense of "franchise fatigue" meant Paramount was not in a hurry to make the next film. With the cancellation of the television series Star Trek: Enterprise in 2005, there was no new Star Trek being made for the screen for the first time in nearly 20 years. In 2005, Viacom, which owned Paramount Pictures, separated from CBS Corporation, which retained Paramount's television properties including ownership of the Star Trek brand. Paramount president Gail Berman (no relation to Rick Berman) convinced CBS chief executive Leslie Moonves to allow them eighteen months to develop a new Star Trek film, otherwise Paramount would lose the film rights. Berman approached Mission: Impossible III director J. J. Abrams and writers Roberto Orci and Alex Kurtzman to develop the next film.

Star Trek (2009) introduces a new cast as younger versions of the Original Series characters, and was widely considered to be a reboot of the franchise. However, it is actually a continuation set in an alternate timeline that is created after the events of the previous films by Spock, with Nimoy reprising his role. The writers chose this approach to free the new film from the restrictions of established continuity without completely discarding it. Orci said he used the term reboot because "that is what the press calls it", but he did not feel it was accurate. The new reality was informally referred to by several names, including the "Abramsverse", "JJ Trek", and "NuTrek", before it was named the "Kelvin Timeline" (versus the "Prime Timeline" of the original series and films) by Michael and Denise Okuda for use in official Star Trek reference guides and encyclopedias. The name comes from the USS Kelvin, a starship involved in the creation of the new timeline which Abrams named after his grandfather, Henry Kelvin. The Kelvin Timeline has since been used as a collective term for the reboot films by Paramount.

Star Trek: Kelvin Timeline films
Film	U.S. release date	Directed by	Screenplay by	Story by	Produced by
Star Trek	May 8, 2009	J. J. Abrams	Roberto Orci & Alex Kurtzman	Roberto Orci & Alex Kurtzman	J. J. Abrams and Damon Lindelof
Star Trek Into Darkness	May 17, 2013	J. J. Abrams	Roberto Orci, Alex Kurtzman & Damon Lindelof	Roberto Orci, Alex Kurtzman & Damon Lindelof	J. J. Abrams, Bryan Burk, Damon Lindelof, Alex Kurtzman and Roberto Orci
Star Trek Beyond	July 22, 2016	Justin Lin	Simon Pegg & Doug Jung	Simon Pegg & Doug Jung	J. J. Abrams, Roberto Orci, Lindsey Weber and Justin Lin

=== Star Trek (2009) ===
In the 24th century, Spock (Leonard Nimoy) fails to stop a supernova from destroying Romulus using an artificial black hole. He is pulled into the black hole with an attacking Romulan mining vessel, captained by Nero (Eric Bana), and they are sent back in time to the 23rd century. This creates a new timeline in which volatile Starfleet cadet James Kirk (Chris Pine) must work with Spock's younger self (Zachary Quinto) to stop Nero.

=== Star Trek Into Darkness (2013) ===
The Enterprise crew hunt a rogue Starfleet operative (Benedict Cumberbatch) who has committed several terrorist attacks, and learn that he is actually Khan Noonien Singh.

=== Star Trek Beyond (2016) ===
The Enterprise is ambushed and the crew are stranded on an unknown planet, where they find themselves in conflict with a new sociopathic enemy (Idris Elba) who hates the Federation and what it stands for.

Roberto Orci, co-writer of the first two reboot films, was hired to direct the third film, but he was replaced by Justin Lin in December 2014. Doug Jung and co-star Simon Pegg wrote the script. Star Trek Beyond was released on July 22, 2016, close to the franchise's 50th anniversary in September 2016.

=== Canceled sequel ===
There were several failed attempts to make a fourth film in the reboot series or another continuation after Beyond was released:

- S. J. Clarkson was hired to direct a sequel written by J. D. Payne and Patrick McKay that would have brought back Chris Hemsworth as George Kirk, father of Chris Pine's James T. Kirk, from the prologue of the first reboot film. However, contract negotiations with Pine and Hemsworth ended in August with the pair leaving the project, which was canceled by January 2019.
- In December 2017, Quentin Tarantino approached Abrams and Paramount about an idea he had for a new Star Trek film, and a writers room was hired consisting of Mark L. Smith, Lindsey Beer, Drew Pearce, and Megan Amram. Smith was chosen to write the film's screenplay at the end of the month, based on Tarantino's idea, but in January 2020, Tarantino said he would not direct the film.
- Noah Hawley was hired to write and direct a new film for Paramount in November 2019, based on his own vision for the franchise. This was very close to production beginning in August 2020 when it was placed on hold by new Paramount Pictures president Emma Watts, who took the franchise in a different direction.
- A new script was developed by Beer and Geneva Robertson-Dworet, and Matt Shakman was hired to direct it in July 2021. In November 2021, Josh Friedman and Cameron Squires were re-writing the script. Abrams announced in February 2022 that the main cast from the reboot films would return, which was a surprise to the actors as negotiations had not yet begun. Shakman left the film in August 2022.
- An "origin story" film was added to Paramount's Star Trek slate in January 2024, with Seth Grahame-Smith and Toby Haynes respectively hired to write and direct. It was reported to either be set in the "Prime Timeline" in the aftermath of humanity's first contact with alien life, as depicted in First Contact, or to be another reboot that retells the first contact and creation of Starfleet stories.

In January 2024, Star Trek 4 was described as the "final chapter" of the main reboot film series. Steve Yockey was writing a new draft of the script by the end of March. Work on that film and the origin story stalled amid the merger of Skydance Media and Paramount Global; by November 2025, Paramount Skydance had canceled Star Trek 4 and was planning a fresh start for the franchise.

== Television film ==
In June 2018, after becoming showrunner of Star Trek: Discovery, Alex Kurtzman signed a five-year overall deal with CBS Television Studios to expand the Star Trek franchise beyond Discovery to several new series, miniseries, and animated series. In March 2023, Kurtzman expressed interest in making television films for the franchise as well, as he was concerned about oversaturating the franchise with too many ongoing television series.

Star Trek: Television films
Film	U.S. release date	Directed by	Screenplay by	Story by	Produced by
Star Trek: Section 31	January 24, 2025	Olatunde Osunsanmi	Craig Sweeny	Bo Yeon Kim and Erika Lippoldt	N/A

=== Star Trek: Section 31 (2025) ===
Former emperor Philippa Georgiou from the Mirror Universe rejoins Section 31, a secret division of Starfleet tasked with protecting the United Federation of Planets through unsanctioned tactics, and must face the sins of her past.

Paramount+ announced in April 2023 that Star Trek: Section 31, which had been in development as a spin-off series from Discovery, was moving forward as a streaming "event film" instead. Michelle Yeoh was attached to reprise her Discovery role of Philippa Georgiou in the film, which was written by Craig Sweeny and directed by Discovery executive producer Olatunde Osunsanmi. Filming took place at Pinewood Toronto Studios in Canada, where Discovery was produced, from January to March 2024. It was released on Paramount+ on January 24, 2025.

=== Potential future films ===
In April 2023, Kurtzman reportedly planned to release a Star Trek streaming film every two years. As Star Trek: Picard was coming to an end, star Patrick Stewart began pushing for a new film to be made starring himself and the rest of the Next Generation cast. In January 2024, Stewart said he had just been told that a Star Trek film was being written for him to star in. By the end of March, Kurtzman was considering a follow-up to Picard as one of the next Star Trek television films if Section 31 was successful. In August 2025, new Paramount+ executive Cindy Holland said television films made for streaming were not a priority for her.

== Reception ==
=== Box office performance ===
Film	Release date	U.S. and Canada	U.S. and Canada (adjusted for inflation)	Other territories	Worldwide	Budget	Ref(s)
Star Trek: The Motion Picture	December 7, 1979	$82,604,699	$366,437,626	$56,741,544	$139,346,243	$45 million	
Star Trek II: The Wrath of Khan	June 4, 1982	$79,707,906	$265,922,066	$16,887,037	$95,800,000	$12 million	
Star Trek III: The Search for Spock	June 1, 1984	$76,471,046	$236,981,861	$10,528,954	$87,000,000	$16 million	
Star Trek IV: The Voyage Home	November 26, 1986	$109,713,132	$322,244,855	$23,286,868	$133,000,000	$21 million	
Star Trek V: The Final Frontier	June 9, 1989	$52,210,049	$135,605,966	$17,989,951	$70,200,000	$30 million	
Star Trek VI: The Undiscovered Country	December 6, 1991	$74,888,996	$177,021,998	$22,000,000	$96,888,996	$27 million	
Star Trek Generations	November 18, 1994	$75,671,125	$164,373,178	$42,400,000	$118,071,125	$38 million	
Star Trek: First Contact	November 22, 1996	$92,027,888	$188,917,848	$54,000,000	$146,027,888	$46 million	
Star Trek: Insurrection	December 11, 1998	$70,187,658	$138,641,403	$42,400,000	$112,587,658	$70 million	
Star Trek: Nemesis	December 13, 2002	$43,254,409	$77,425,792	$24,082,061	$67,336,470	$60 million	
Star Trek	May 8, 2009	$257,730,019	$386,774,924	$127,951,749	$385,681,768	$150 million	
Star Trek Into Darkness	May 16, 2013	$228,778,661	$316,204,792	$238,586,585	$467,365,246	$190 million	
Star Trek Beyond	July 22, 2016	$158,848,340	$213,097,295	$184,623,476	$343,471,816	$185 million	
Total		$1,401,298,985	$2,990,334,013	$865,770,317	$2,264,775,888	$893 million	

=== Critical response ===
Film	Critical		Public
Film	Rotten Tomatoes	Metacritic	CinemaScore
Star Trek: The Motion Picture	51% (57 reviews)	50 (17 reviews)	—N/a
Star Trek II: The Wrath of Khan	87% (75 reviews)	68 (19 reviews)	—N/a
Star Trek III: The Search for Spock	78% (50 reviews)	58 (18 reviews)	—N/a
Star Trek IV: The Voyage Home	82% (49 reviews)	71 (17 reviews)	A+
Star Trek V: The Final Frontier	22% (54 reviews)	43 (16 reviews)	A−
Star Trek VI: The Undiscovered Country	83% (59 reviews)	65 (18 reviews)	A−
Star Trek Generations	47% (64 reviews)	55 (22 reviews)	B+
Star Trek: First Contact	87% (164 reviews)	70 (18 reviews)	A−
Star Trek: Insurrection	55% (77 reviews)	64 (19 reviews)	B+
Star Trek: Nemesis	37% (171 reviews)	51 (29 reviews)	A−
Star Trek	94% (352 reviews)	82 (46 reviews)	A
Star Trek Into Darkness	84% (294 reviews)	72 (43 reviews)	A
Star Trek Beyond	86% (317 reviews)	68 (50 reviews)	A−
Star Trek: Section 31	24% (51 reviews)	37 (16 reviews)	—N/a

=== Academy Awards ===
Film	Art Direction	Cinematography	Makeup	Original Score	Sound Editing	Sound Mixing	Visual Effects
Star Trek: The Motion Picture (1979)	Nominated				Nominated		Nominated
Star Trek IV: The Voyage Home (1986)		Nominated		Nominated	Nominated	Nominated	
Star Trek VI: The Undiscovered Country (1991)			Nominated		Nominated		
Star Trek: First Contact (1996)			Nominated				
Star Trek (2009)			Won		Nominated	Nominated	Nominated
Star Trek Into Darkness (2013)							Nominated
Star Trek Beyond (2016)			Nominated				

== Future ==
After Paramount Skydance chose not to bring back the cast of the reboot films, Jonathan Goldstein and John Francis Daley were hired in November 2025 to write, direct, and produce a new Star Trek film under their GoldDay banner. They said in September 2026 that they were hoping to launching a "new franchise", and were less concerned with which timeline the film is set in. It takes place in close to real time and was influenced by the films Crimson Tide (1995) and Training Day (2001).

== See also ==
- List of Star Trek production staff
- List of Star Trek television series
