= Recalled to Life =

Recalled to Life may refer to:

- Recalled to Life (novel), a Dalziel and Pascoe novel by Reginald Hill
- Recalled to Life (Silverberg novel), a novel by Robert Silverberg
- Recalled to Life, the first book of the novel A Tale of Two Cities by Charles Dickens
