= LCARS =

Fictional computer operating system utilized in Star Trek

- Star Trek franchise element
- LCARS-style desktop
- First appearance: Star Trek: The Next Generation
- Created by: Michael Okuda
- Genre: Science fiction

In-universe information
- Type: Computer operating system
- Affiliation: Starfleet

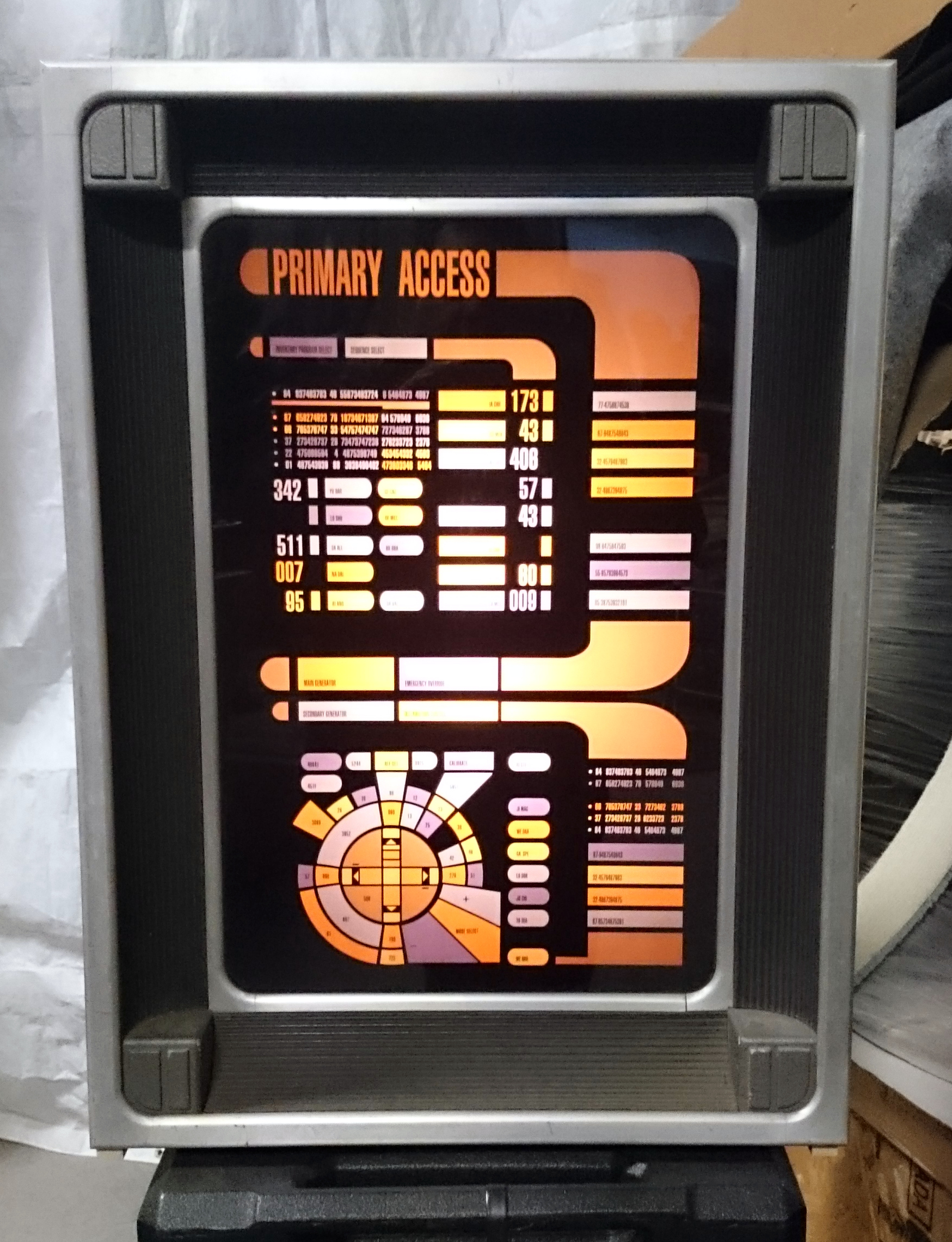
An LCARS panel from Star Trek: Voyager, similar to one shown in the third-season episode "Displaced". The colors of the backlit artwork have faded over time; the panel looks more yellow and blue in the episode.

In the Star Trek fictional universe, LCARS (/ˈɛlkɑːrz/; an acronym for Library Computer Access/Retrieval System) is a computer operating system. Within Star Trek chronology, the term was first used in the Star Trek: The Next Generation series.

== Production ==
The LCARS graphical user interface was designed by scenic art supervisor and technical consultant Michael Okuda. The original design concept was influenced by a request from Gene Roddenberry that the instrument panels not have a great deal of activity on them. This minimalized look was designed to give a sense that the technology was much more advanced than in the original Star Trek.

On Star Trek: The Next Generation, many of the buttons were labeled with the initials of members of the production crew and were referred to as "Okudagrams."

== PADD ==
Close-up of a PADD, as seen in Star Trek and Stargate SG-1: The Alliance

The LCARS interface is often seen used on a PADD (Personal Access Display Device), a hand-held computer.

At seven-inch (180 mm); eight-inch (200 mm); nine-inch (230 mm) and up to: ten-inch (250 mm) only similarly sized modern tablet computers; such as the Apple iPad Mini; Amazon Fire; Surface Go 1st, 2nd 3rd, and 4th; BlackBerry PlayBook and plus the Nexus 7 have been compared with these PADDs. Several mobile apps were created which offered an LCARS-style interface.

== Legal ==
CBS Television Studios claims to hold the copyright on LCARS. Google was sent a DMCA letter to remove the Android app called Tricorder since its use of the LCARS interface was un-licensed. The application was later re-uploaded under a different title, but it was removed again.
