= Total Recall (1990 soundtrack) =

Film score by Jerry Goldsmith
- Released: 1990 (original release); 2000 (deluxe edition); June 1, 2015 (25th anniversary re-issue); November 27, 2020 (30th anniversary re-issue)
- Genre: Film score
- Length: 40:13 (original release); 71:20 (deluxe edition); 144:03 (25th anniversary re-issue); 117:43 (30th anniversary re-issue)
- Labels: Varèse Sarabande; Quartet Records
- Producer: Jerry Goldsmith

Jerry Goldsmith chronology
Star Trek V: The Final Frontier (1989)	Total Recall (1990)	Gremlins 2: The New Batch (1990)

The original score to the 1990 science fiction action film Total Recall directed by Paul Verhoeven, features music composed by Jerry Goldsmith which was recorded with the National Philharmonic Orchestra of London. The album was first released by Varèse Sarabande in 1990s, that does not feature the score in full, and only limited number of cues were present. Subsequent re-releases, however led to expand the full score with Quartet Records publishing the re-issued albums in digital and physical formats.

It received critical acclaim and was hailed as one of Goldsmith's best scores in his career. He would further go on to receive a Saturn Award nomination for Best Music in 1991 (also being nominated in the same category for Gremlins 2: The New Batch), but lost the award to Alan Silvestri for his score in Back to the Future Part III.

== Release history ==
The album was first issued in CD, LP and cassettes on the year of its release by Varèse Sarabande, and featured 10 existing cues from the film score that runs for 40-minutes. A deluxe edition that featured 27 tracks running for an hour was released, ten years later.

On the 25th anniversary of its release (June 1, 2015), Quartet Records announced the anniversary edition of the soundtrack for digital, CD and vinyl releases. A double disc CD that released for the album, featured cues from the original score in entirety, including the missing tracks—"Where Am I?" and "End Credits"—in the first disc. The second disc contained the original score from the 1990 release, alternate cues and source cues used in the film. The disc also featured a recording of "Clever Girl" from the film's German recording sessions, as well as Goldsmith's composition for commercial jingles while Bruno Louchouarn provided additional pieces heard on Mars. The album had overall 53 tracks running for nearly 2 1/2 hours. It was packaged with liner notes from the film crew, and accompanied by a 24-page booklet.

Another re-issue was followed on November 27, 2020 as a part of the film's 30th anniversary. Light in the Attic Records in collaboration with Quartet Records had announced a triple-disc vinyl for the soundtrack. Unlike the double-disc CD that released for the 30th anniversary, there are only 38 tracks for approximately less than two hours, with the source cues being excluded.

Goldsmith's longtime collaborator and scoring mixer Bruce Botnick, remixed, remastered and produced the score cues for the current release.

== Track listing ==
=== Original release (1990) ===
No.	Title	Length
1.	"The Dream"	3:33
2.	"The Hologram"	5:36
3.	"The Big Jump"	4:33
4.	"The Mutant"	3:16
5.	"Clever Girl"	4:31
6.	"First Meeting"	1:10
7.	"The Treatment"	5:30
8.	"Where Am I?"	3:56
9.	"End Of A Dream"	5:45
10.	"A New Life"	2:23
Total length:		40:13

=== The Deluxe Edition (2000) ===
No.	Title	Length
1.	"The Dream"	3:32
2.	"First Meeting"	1:10
3.	"Secret Agent"	0:52
4.	"The Implant"	2:41
5.	"The Aftermath"	0:30
6.	"For Old Times' Sake"	3:00
7.	"Clever Girl"	4:30
8.	"The Johnny Cab"	3:47
9.	"Howdy Stranger"	2:00
10.	"The Nose Job"	1:55
11.	"The Space Station"	0:47
12.	"A New Face"	1:29
13.	"The Mountain"	1:27
14.	"Identification"	1:02
15.	"Lies"	1:04
16.	"Where Am I?"	3:59
17.	"Swallow It"	3:07
18.	"The Big Jump"	4:33
19.	"Without Air"	1:15
20.	"Remembering"	1:50
21.	"The Mutant"	3:16
22.	"The Massacre"	2:34
23.	"Friends"	1:40
24.	"The Treatment"	5:36
25.	"The Hologram"	5:36
26.	"End of a Dream"	5:46
27.	"A New Life"	2:22
Total length:		71:20

=== 25th Anniversary Edition (2015) ===
Disc 1
No.	Title	Length
1.	"The Dream"	3:38
2.	"First Meeting"	1:11
3.	"Secret Agent"	0:54
4.	"The Implant"	2:44
5.	"Where Am I?"	1:07
6.	"The Aftermath"	0:33
7.	"Old Times Sake"	3:03
8.	"Clever Girl"	4:34
9.	"The Johnny Cab"	3:50
10.	"Howdy Stranger / The Nose Job"	3:54
11.	"The Spaceport"	0:50
12.	"A New Face"	1:30
13.	"The Mountain"	1:31
14.	"Identification"	1:02
15.	"Lies"	1:04
16.	"Where Am I?"	4:00
17.	"Swallow It"	3:06
18.	"The Big Jump"	4:35
19.	"Without Air"	1:17
20.	"Remembering"	1:48
21.	"The Mutant"	3:16
22.	"The Massacre"	2:37
23.	"Friends?"	1:39
24.	"The Treatment"	5:40
25.	"The Reactor / The Hologram"	5:39
26.	"End of a Dream"	5:49
27.	"A New Life"	2:25
28.	"End Credits"	3:49
Total length:		77:05

Disc 2
No.	Title	Length
1.	"The Dream"	3:34
2.	"The Hologram"	5:38
3.	"The Big Jump"	4:36
4.	"The Mutant"	3:18
5.	"Clever Girl"	4:34
6.	"First Meeting"	1:12
7.	"The Treatment"	5:33
8.	"Where Am I?"	3:58
9.	"End of a Dream"	5:49
10.	"A New Life"	2:26
11.	"The Implant" (alternate opening)	2:43
12.	"Clever Girl" (original performance)	4:28
13.	"Divertimento in D" (composed by Wolfgang Amadeus Mozart)	0:53
14.	"Rubble City" (composed by Bruno Louchouarn)	3:19
15.	"Mutant Dancing" (composed by Bruno Louchouarn)	4:36
16.	"Running Out of Air" (composed by Bruno Louchouarn)	3:02
17.	"Rekall Commercial"	0:52
18.	"Environmental Source"	1:09
19.	"ESPN"	1:13
20.	"Saturn"	0:31
21.	"Mars"	1:11
22.	"Rekall" (background)	0:47
23.	"Botco"	0:10
24.	"North West"	0:35
25.	"Rekall Commercial" (alternate)	0:51
Total length:		66:58

=== 30th Anniversary Edition (2020) ===
Disc 1
No.	Title	Length
1.	"The Dream"	3:38
2.	"First Meeting"	1:11
3.	"Secret Agent"	0:54
4.	"The Implant"	2:44
5.	"Where Am I?"	1:07
6.	"The Aftermath"	0:33
7.	"Old Times Sake"	3:03
8.	"Clever Girl"	4:34
9.	"The Johnny Cab"	3:50
10.	"Howdy Stranger / The Nose Job"	3:54
11.	"The Spaceport"	0:50
12.	"A New Face"	1:30
13.	"The Mountain"	1:31
14.	"Identification"	1:02
15.	"Lies"	1:04
16.	"Where Am I?"	4:00
17.	"Swallow It"	3:06
Total length:		38:31

Disc 2
No.	Title	Length
1.	"The Big Jump"	4:35
2.	"Without Air"	1:17
3.	"Remembering"	1:48
4.	"The Mutant"	3:16
5.	"The Massacre"	2:37
6.	"Friends?"	1:39
7.	"The Treatment"	5:40
8.	"The Reactor / The Hologram"	5:39
9.	"End of a Dream"	5:49
10.	"A New Life"	2:25
11.	"End Credits"	3:49
Total length:		38:34

Disc 3
No.	Title	Length
1.	"The Dream"	3:34
2.	"The Hologram"	5:38
3.	"The Big Jump"	4:36
4.	"The Mutant"	3:18
5.	"Clever Girl"	4:34
6.	"First Meeting"	1:12
7.	"The Treatment"	5:33
8.	"Where Am I?"	3:58
9.	"End of a Dream"	5:49
10.	"A New Life"	2:26
Total length:		40:38

== Critical response ==
The Total Recall score was critically acclaimed and hailed as one of Goldsmith's best scores in his career. Filmtracks.com wrote "The film's futuristic, outlandish story and flashy visuals are well-suited for Goldsmith's synthetically paced score. He would have the opportunity to engage his audience with his maturing use of light electronics while also brandishing his talents with rhythmic and raw orchestral action. It is the delicate, but well-maintained balance between these two basic elements that makes Total Recall such an enjoyable score, even when divorced from the stunning visuals of the film." Jonathan Broxton wrote "Considering that the film opened just six months into the new decade, and allowing for all the outstanding music that would come later, Total Recall remains one of the best sci-fi action scores of the 1990s, and for my money is one of the most purely enjoyable genre efforts of Jerry Goldsmith's entire career. Disregarding the director request to emulate Basil Poledouris in the main title, the rest of Total Recall sees Jerry Goldsmith at his most creative, and emotionally satisfying. The blend of orchestra and electronics is both sophisticated and appropriate, the thematic ideas are strong and memorable, and the majority of the action music is complicated, exciting, and intellectually stimulating from a compositional point of view." James Southall of Movie Wave called it as "an essential part of the collection of any fan of modern-day Goldsmith music, it is breathlessly exciting from start to finish. He's never written anything better in the action genre."

Steven McDonald of AllMusic commented "Goldsmith has fashioned a score that's primarily driven by the orchestra, rather than being primarily dependent on electronic keyboards. To that extent, it's a rather old-fashioned action/suspense score, building and releasing tension in many varied ways. One can easily visualize action coupled to the music — again, that old-fashioned, almost Hitchcockian nervousness where nothing makes any sense and everything is a threat. While themes, as always, reappear at points during the score, the repetition is kept to a minimum, which is also a plus. Also kept to a minimum is Goldsmith's tendency to insert the odd too-sweet theme. If anything, this particular score is a stunning display of Goldsmith's brilliance as a composer — a great deal of it would not be out of place on the concert stage." Robert Purvis of Mfiles.com wrote "Total Recall is a little gem of a soundtrack and comes highly recommended for those who appreciate both Verhoeven's movie and powerful scores in general."

Reviewing for the 30th anniversary release, Soundtrack Beat commented "With every beat, every cue, and everything you could want to know about the creation of this breakthrough score, it's more than the definitive release."

Ranked at nine on "30 Greatest Film Scores of Jerry Goldsmith" writer Sean Wilson commented "Goldsmith's blisteringly complex, seamless fusion of dizzying orchestral writing with otherwordly electronics remains a high watermark in sci-fi/action scoring: intuitive, innovative and relentlessly exciting. His music zipping around as quickly as Arnie dodges on-screen bullets, Goldsmith himself marvelled at the sheer number of notes he'd composed for the project. Easily a candidate for the greatest action score of all time."
