= Herman F. Zimmerman =

American production designer

- Born: April 19, 1935 (age 91)
- Occupations: Art director Production designer
- Years active: 1965–present

Herman F. Zimmerman (born 19 April 1935) is an art director and production designer. He is probably best known for his work on Star Trek franchise.

== College ==
Zimmerman initially aspired to be an actor and enrolled at Northwestern University to study acting and directing. He then changed his major to theatre production, in order to take an assistantship in technical theatre. Zimmerman then became an associate professor of drama at Northwestern University for 5 years, where he was a Technical Director and Scene Designer for the university's theatre.

== Career ==
Zimmerman began working for NBC in 1965, as an assistant art director on Days of Our Lives. Zimmerman has worked on a project with the Institute for Creative Technologies in Southern California, called the "Experience Learning System", which was commissioned by the US Army.

Throughout the 1970s, Zimmerman served as an art director on several of Sid and Marty Kroffts' shows, including Sigmund and the Sea Monsters, Land of the Lost, Far Out Space Nuts, The Lost Saucer, and Donny and Marie.

=== Star Trek ===
Zimmerman began working in the Star Trek franchise when he was hired to work on Star Trek: The Next Generation, where he served as production designer during the first season, leaving to work on the feature film Star Trek V: The Final Frontier. Zimmerman worked as production designer on five additional Star Trek feature films: The Undiscovered Country, Generations, First Contact, Insurrection and Nemesis. Zimmerman was also the production designer for Star Trek: Deep Space Nine, for which he received four Emmy nominations, and Star Trek: Enterprise, which was his final work for the Star Trek franchise.

=== Awards and nominations ===
Zimmerman won the Art Directors Guild Awards 1996's Excellence in Production Design Award - Television for his work on Deep Space Nine.

Zimmerman's first Emmy nomination, for the pilot episode, "Emissary", was shared with art director Randy McIlvain and set decorator Mickey S. Michaels. Zimmerman's next three nominations – for "Trials and Tribble-ations", "Far Beyond the Stars" and "Prodigal Daughter" – were shared with McIlvain and set decorator Laura Richarz.
