= Freer (surname) =

Freer is a surname. Primarily of British origins, Freer generally derives from the surnames Frère and Frere and their respective French and Old French words.

== Origins ==
The earliest instances of the surname found in the British Isles are believed to have came to be as nicknames meaning brother, friend, or comrade were adopted as surnames and became family names. At times it emerged as a relational surname from a literal meaning of the Old French word frere for brother. Then, in the 12th century, when the word began to refer to friars, and newer adoptions of the surname began to reflect this. Frere became a nickname for someone who acted piously, but also indulgent and hypocritical, as friars became less popular, and the nickname took on a derogatory connotation. When these nicknames came to be surnames, sometimes their spelling shifted to "Freer". The surname also came to be as a nickname or occupational name for someone who worked in a monastery or friary. While some friars likely had children, they were not allowed to marry, making this uncommon. After the Reformation, those who had been friars were now allowed to marry, giving way to the use of Freer as an occupational surname for those descended from monks and friars.

Outside of Great Britain, the surname was commonplace in Jurby, on the Isle of Man, in the 17th century. Instances of Freer can also be found in the Irish south midlands, with potential relations to the surname Prior, but more likely of Anglo-Norman origin. Freer has also been observed as an americanization of the French surname Frère. The surname has also been attested to be a Flemish variant of the name Frederick.

== People ==
Notable people with the surname include:

- Ada Goodrich Freer (1857–1931), British fraudster
- Agnes Lee Freer (1862–1939), American poet and translator
- Ania Freer, Australian-Jamaican documentary filmmaker
- Barbara Freer, poker champion
- Carl Freer, Swedish businessman
- Charles Lang Freer (1854–1919), American industrialist and art collector
- Charles Thomas Freer (1809–1882), English cricketer and British Army officer
- Craig Freer (born 1975), Australian rugby player
- Dave Freer (born 1959), Australian writer
- Eleanor Everest Freer (1864–1942), American composer and philanthropist
- Elinor Freer, American pianist
- Fred Freer (1915–1998), Australian cricketer
- Frederick Warren Freer (1849–1908), American painter
- Henry Freer (1833–1904), Archdeacon of Derby
- Ian Freer, British author
- Ian Lennox Freer (born 1941), British Army officer
- Jacob S. Freer (1824–1892), American physician and politician
- James Freer (1855–1933), Canadian filmmaker
- John Freer (1803–1834), English cricketer
- Justin Freer, American conductor
- Lily Freer (born 2006), American college soccer player
- Mabel Freer (1911–?), British mistress
- Mark Freer (born 1968), Canadian ice hockey player
- Mark Kevin Frear (1970–2014), American professional wrestler
- Martha Walker Freer (1822–1888), English writer
- Martin Freer, British nuclear physicist
- Mike Freer (born 1960), British politician
- Randy Freer, American television executive
- Richard D. Freer (born 1953), American professor
- Richard Lane Freer (died 1863), Archdeacon of Hereford
- Robert Freer (physician) (1745–1827), British medical academic
- Robert E. Freer (1896–1963), American politician
- Robert George Freer, American set decorator
- Robert William George Freer (1923–2012), British Royal Air Force officer
- Romeo H. Freer (1846–1913), American judge and politician
- Scott Freer (born 1988), English rugby player
- Walter Freer, Scottish aristocrat
- Warren Freer (1920–2013), New Zealand politician
- Winston Freer (1910–1981), American magician

== See also ==
- Friar#Etymology
- Freer Gallery of Art
- Freer logion

=== Related surnames ===
- Frear
- Frears
- Freear
- Freers
- Friar (surname)
- Frier
- Fryer (surname)
