= Frere (surname) =

Frere is a surname. Notable people with the surname include:

- Alexander Stuart Frere (1892–1984), English publisher
- Bartholomew Frere (1776–1851), English diplomat
- Bartle Henry Temple Frere (1862–1953), British barrister and judge
- Celine Frere, Swiss evolutionary biologist
- Henry Frere (1830–1881), English cricketer
- Sir Henry Bartle Frere (1815–1884), British colonial administrator
- James Frere (1920–1994), Chester Herald at the College of Arms in London
- James Hatley Frere (1779–1866), English writer on prophecy
- John Frere (1740–1807), English antiquary
- John Hookham Frere (1769–1846), English diplomat, author and poet
- Lionel Frere (1870–1936), English cricketer
- Margaret Frere (1863–1961), British school manager and welfare worker
- Mary Frere (1845–1911), English writer
- Philip Howard Frere (1813–1868), English academic and writer
- Sheppard Frere (1916–2015), British historian and archaeologist
- Tobias Frere-Jones (born 1970), American typeface designer and design educator
- Toby Frere (1938–2020), Royal Navy vice-admiral
- Walter Frere (1863–1938), British Anglican bishop
- Walter Frere (MP) (fl.1381–1388), English politician
- William Frere (1775–1836), English lawyer and academic
- William J. Frere (1861–1922), American farmer and politician

== See also ==
- Frere (disambiguation)
- Frère
- Friar
- Fryar
- Freer (disambiguation)
- Fryer (surname)
- Frier (disambiguation)
