= Freer =

Freer may refer to:

== People ==
Authors
- Dave Freer (born 1959), Australian science fiction author
- Ian Freer, British non-fiction author
Business and commerce
- Carl Freer (born 1970), Swedish businessman and technology entrepreneur
- Charles Lang Freer (1854–1919), late American industrialist and art collector
Education
- Martin Freer, British nuclear physicist, astronomer, and university professor
- Richard Freer (born 1953), professor at Emory University School of Law
- Robert Freer (1745–1827), late Scottish physician and medical school professor
Military
- Ian Freer (British Army officer) (born 1941), British Army general
- Sir Robert Freer (1923–2012), late Royal Air Force air chief marshal
Music, fine arts, entertainment
- Ada Goodrich Freer (1857–1931), late British medium, clairvoyant and researcher
- Eleanor Everest Freer (1864–1942), late American composer
- Elinor Freer, American pianist
- Frederick Warren Freer (1849–1908), late American painter
- James Simmons Freer (1855–1933), late Canadian filmmaking pioneer
- Justin Freer (born 1980), American composer and conductor
- Winston Freer (1910–1981), late illusionist/magician
Public service
- Jacob S. Freer (1824–1892), late New York politician
- Mike Freer (born 1960), British politician
- Robert Elliott Freer (1896–1963), late three-time Chairman of the United States Federal Trade Commission
- Romeo H. Freer (1846–1913), late Attorney General of West Virginia
- Warren Freer (1920–2013), late New Zealand politician
- Walter Freer (born 1846), late Scottish politician and temperance activist
Sports
- Barbara Freer, World Series of Poker champion
- Fred Freer (1915–1998), late Australian cricketer
- John Freer (1803–1834), late English cricketer
- Mark Paul Freer (born 1968), Canadian former professional hockey player
- Scott Freer (born 1988), English rugby union player
TV and film
- Ania Freer (born 1986), Australian-Jamaican documentary filmmaker
- James Freer (1855–1933), late Canadian film-maker
- Randy Freer (born 1959/60), American television executive
Other
- Mabel Freer (died 2004), late British woman deported from Australia

== Places ==
- Freer, Texas
- Freer Gallery of Art, Washington, D.C.

== See also ==
- Freer at Wiktionary
- Frear (disambiguation)
