= Fryer =

A fryer is a container for frying food.

Fryer may also refer to:

== People ==
- Fryer (surname)

== Places ==
- Fryer, Kentucky, a community in the United States
- Fryers Forest
- Fryer House

== Other uses ==
- Deep fryer
- Pressure fryer
- Air fryer
- Turkey fryer
- Vacuum fryer
- Bratt pan fryer
- An intermediate size (2.5-3.5 lbs.) of chicken

== See also ==
- Frere
- Freer (disambiguation)
- Fryar
- Friar
- Frier (disambiguation)
