= Robert Freer =

Robert Freer may refer to:

- Robert Freer (RAF officer) (1923–2012), Royal Air Force (RAF) officer
- Robert Freer (physician) (1745–1827), English soldier and academic
- Robert E. Freer (1896–1963), chair of the U.S. Federal Trade Commission
- Robert George Freer, American set decorator
