= Freear =

Freear is a surname. Notable people with the surname include:

- Albert Freear (1878–1960), Irish rugby union player
- Gary Freear (born 1982), English cricketer
- Louie Freear (1871–1939), English actress and comedienne
