= Freier =

Freier may refer to:

== People ==
- Adam Freier (born 1980), Australian rugby footballer, son of Laurie
- Laurie Freier, Australian rugby footballer and coach
- Paul Freier (born 1979), German footballer
- Philip Freier, 13th Archbishop of Melbourne, Australia
- Rachel Freier (born 1965), Civil Court judge in New York
- Recha Freier (1892-1984), founder of the Youth Aliyah organisation
- Shalheveth Freier (1920–1995), World War II soldier
- Tom Freier, American politician

== Music ==
- Freier Fall, Christina Stürmer's debut album

== See also ==
- Frier (disambiguation)
- Freer (disambiguation)
