= Edward Johnson Wayne =

English physician, biochemist, thyroidologist and professor of medicine

- Born: 3 June 1902; Leeds, Yorkshire, England
- Died: 19 August 1990 (aged 88); Great Yarmouth
- Occupations: Physician and professor of medicine
- Known for: Practice of Medicine Regius Professorship at the University of Glasgow (1953–1967); Clinical Aspects of Iodine Metabolism (1964)

Sir Edward Johnson Wayne FRCP FRCPE (3 June 1902 – 19 August 1990) was an English physician, biochemist, thyroidologist, and professor of medicine.

== Biography ==
Wayne attended Leeds Central High School from 1914 to 1920 and then matriculated at the University of Leeds, graduating there in 1923 BSc in chemistry and in 1924 MSc after working on organic chemistry. He then went to the University of Manchester to do research under Hugh Stanley Raper on the intermediary metabolism of the fatty acids. Wayne graduated there in 1925 with a PhD.

He took classes in anatomy and physiology during a postdoctoral year of research at Manchester and then returned in 1926 to Leeds to study medicine, graduating MB, ChB in 1929. From 1930 to 1931 he was a demonstrator in physiology at the University of Leeds.

Wayne carried out some of the earliest trials on digoxin as well as an investigation on angina, using the ‘2-step test’ for the first time.

From 1931 to 1934 Wayne worked as an assistant under the cardiologist Thomas Lewis in the department of clinical research at University College Hospital, London. He qualified MRCP in 1932. From 1934 to 1953 he was Professor of Pharmacology and Therapeutics at the University of Sheffield, "establishing a reputation as a clinical scientist and as a talented director of research." He also became an associate physician to Sheffield Royal Infirmary. He was elected FRCP in 1937 and graduated MD in 1938. In 1953, as successor to Sir John William McNee, Wayne was appointed Regius Professor of the Practice of Medicine at Glasgow University. He held the professorship until his retirement as professor emeritus in 1967. In 1956 he was elected a member of the Harveian Society of Edinburgh.

As Regius Professor at Glasgow he was able to use the facilities available in the Gardiner Institute at the Western Infirmary to pursue research into thyroid disease, cardiovascular disease, osteoporosis and blood disorders.

... he was later appointed physician to the Children’s Hospital and to the Emergency Medical Service. In 1941 he took charge of the beds and consulting practice of Robert Platt, later Lord Platt ... during the latter's absence in military service. ... After the war he became once again a full-time professor of therapeutics ...

He was the Bradshaw Lecturer in 1953 and the Lumleian Lecturer in 1959. He was elected FRCPE in 1955. He was knighted in 1964.

Among many positions, Wayne was Chairman of the Clinical Research Board of the Medical Research Council, 1960 to 1964 and Honorary Physician to the Queen in Scotland, from 1954 to 1967. His work on the BMA's Committee on Alcohol and Road Accidents led to the introduction of the blood alcohol limit of 80 mg per 100 ml of blood in the Road Safety Act, 1967.

In 1932 in Scarborough, North Yorkshire he married Honora Nancy Halloran. Upon his death in 1990 he was survived by his widow, a son, and a daughter.

== Wayne's diagnostic index ==
By using a statistical procedure partially based on discriminant analysis, James Crooks, I. P. C. Murray, and Edward J. Wayne developed a clinical diagnostic index (sometimes called the "Wayne score") in thyrotoxicosis. The procedure allocates a positive or negative score to each clinical feature and provides a numerical estimate of the degree of severity of the disease.

Older generations of endocrinologists were familiar with the use of Wayne's score and Billewicz's score for clinical diagnoses of hyperthyroidism and hypothyroidism, respectively. Contemporary medical textbooks have discarded those two diagnostic scores as old-fashioned. However, various scoring and grading systems in clinical thyroidology might still have value.

== Selected publications ==
=== Articles ===
- Wayne, E. J. (1928). "The estimation of hippuric and phenaceturic acids in urine". Biochem J. 22 (1): 183–187. doi:10.1042/bj0220183. PMC 1252104. PMID 16743995.
- Wayne, E. J. (October 1943). "Painful Feet from the Physician's Point of View". Postgrad Med J. 19 (215): 239–242. doi:10.1136/pgmj.19.215.239. PMC 2478026. PMID 21313339.
- Wayne, E. J.; Goodwin, J. F.; Stoner, H. B. (January 1949). "The effect of adenosine triphosphate on the electrocardiogram of man and animals". Br Heart J. 11 (1): 55–67. doi:10.1136/hrt.11.1.55. PMC 503617. PMID 18113469.
- Emery, J. L.; Rose, L. M.; Stewart, S. M.; Wayne, E. J. (25 June 1949). "Procaine Penicillin with Aluminium Monostearate". Br Med J. 1 (4616): 1110–1112. doi:10.1136/bmj.1.4616.1110. PMC 2050391. PMID 18145953.
- Goodwin, J. F.; Steiner, R.; Wayne, E. J. (July 1949). "Transposition of the aorta and pulmonary artery demonstrated by angiocardiography". Br Heart J. 11 (3): 279–286. doi:10.1136/hrt.11.3.279. PMC 479377. PMID 18145530.
- Wayne, E. J.; Colquhoun, J.; Burke, J. (10 December 1949). "Procaine Penicillin with Aluminium Monostearate in Adults". Br Med J. 2 (4640): 1319–1322. doi:10.1136/bmj.2.4640.1319. PMC 2052081. PMID 15407914.
- MacGregor, A. G.; Wayne, E. J. (January 1951). "Fluorescein test of circulation time in peripheral vascular disease". Br Heart J. 13 (1): 80–88. doi:10.1136/hrt.13.1.80. PMC 503677. PMID 14791888.
- Blomfield, G. W.; MacGregor, A. G.; Miller, H.; Wayne, E. J. (18 August 1951). "Treatment of Thyrotoxicosis with Radioactive Iodine". Br Med J. 2 (4728): 373–381. doi:10.1136/bmj.2.4728.373. PMC 2069753. PMID 14858860.
- Wayne, E. J. (29 September 1951). "Medical Relief of Pain". Br Med J. 2 (4734): 787–789. doi:10.1136/bmj.2.4734.787. PMC 2069831. PMID 14869722.
- Wayne, E. J. (6 October 1951). "Correct Dose of Digitalin". Br Med J. 2 (4735): 850. doi:10.1136/bmj.2.4735.850-a. PMC 2070026.
- Blackburn, E. K.; Burke, J.; Roseman, C.; Wayne, E. J. (2 August 1952). "Comparison of Liver Extract and Vitamin B12 in Maintenance Treatment of Pernicious Anaemia". Br Med J. 2 (4778): 245–248. doi:10.1136/bmj.2.4778.245. PMC 2020972. PMID 14935383.
- Wayne, E. J. (20 February 1954). "The Diagnosis of Thyrotoxicosis". Br Med J. 1 (4859): 411–419. doi:10.1136/bmj.1.4859.411. PMC 2084526. PMID 13126528. (Bradshaw Lecture)
- Wayne, E. J. (25 September 1954). "Treatment of Peripheral Vascular Disease in Old Age". Br Med J. 2 (4890): 718–720. doi:10.1136/bmj.2.4890.718. PMC 2079051. PMID 13190238.
- Wayne, E. J. (15 January 1955). "Peripheral circulation". Br Med J. 1 (4906): 151–152. doi:10.1136/bmj.1.4906.151-b. PMC 2061045.
- Wayne, E. J. (31 December 1955). "Atherosclerosis". Br Med J. 2 (4956): 1605–1606. doi:10.1136/bmj.2.4956.1605-b. PMC 1981747.
- Blomfield, G. W.; Jones, J. C.; MacGregor, A. G.; Miller, H.; Wayne, E. J.; Weetch, R. S. (19 November 1955). "Treatment of Thyrotoxicosis with Radioactive Iodine". Br Med J. 2 (4950): 1223–1229. doi:10.1136/bmj.2.4950.1223. PMC 1981295. PMID 13269836.
- MacGregor, A. G.; Wayne, E. J. (31 December 1955). "Toxic Goitre". Br Med J. 2 (4956): 1618. doi:10.1136/bmj.2.4956.1618. PMC 1981754.
- Muldowney, F. P.; Bluhm, M. M.; Wayne, E. J. (30 November 1957). "Red-cell Survival in Paroxysmal Nocturnal Haemoglobinuria". Br Med J. 2 (5056): 1277–1279. doi:10.1136/bmj.2.5056.1277. PMC 1963168. PMID 13479697.
- Fraser, R.; Taylor, S.; Wayne, E. J. (11 January 1958). "Thyroid Association". Br Med J. 1 (5062): 103. doi:10.1136/bmj.1.5062.103-e. PMC 2027101.
- Crooks, J.; Wayne, E. J.; MURRAY IP (10 January 1959). "Potassium Perchlorate Sensitivity". Br Med J. 1 (5114): 112–3. doi:10.1136/bmj.1.5114.112-a. PMC 1992184. PMID 13608094.
- Wayne, E. J. (2 January 1960). "Clinical and Metabolic Studies in Thyroid Disease—I". Br Med J. 1 (5165): 1–11. doi:10.1136/bmj.1.5165.1. PMC 1966357. PMID 13843210. (1st of 2 Lumleian Lectures)
- Wayne, E. J. (9 January 1960). "Clinical and Metabolic Studies in Thyroid Disease—II". Br Med J. 1 (5166): 78–90. doi:10.1136/bmj.1.5166.78. PMC 1966196. PMID 13843211. (2nd of 2 Lumleian Lectures)
- Crooks, J.; Buchanan, W. W.; Wayne, E. J.; MacDonald, E. (16 January 1960). "Effect of Pretreatment with Methylthiouracil on Results of 131I Therapy". Br Med J. 1 (5167): 151–154. doi:10.1136/bmj.1.5167.151. PMC 1966292. PMID 13812984.
- Duthie, J. J.; Girdwood, R. H.; Hubble, D.; MacGregor, A. G.; Wayne, E. J.; Wilson, A.; Wilson, G. M. (16 July 1960). ""Imferom" and Cancer". Br Med J. 2 (5193): 234. doi:10.1136/bmj.2.5193.234-a. PMC 2097726.
- Buchanan, W. W.; Alexander, W. D.; Crooks, J.; Koutras, D. A.; Wayne, E. J.; Anderson, J. R.; Goudie, R. B. (25 March 1961). "Association of Thyrotoxicosis and Auto-immune Thyroiditis". Br Med J. 1 (5229): 843–847. doi:10.1136/bmj.1.5229.843. PMC 1953621. PMID 20789100.
- Alexander, W. D.; Koutras, D. A.; Crooks, J.; Buchanan, W. W.; MacDonald, E. M.; Richmond, M. H.; Wayne, E. J. (1962). "Quantitative studies of iodine metabolism in thyroid disease". QJM: An International Journal of Medicine. 31 (3): 281–305. doi:10.1093/oxfordjournals.qjmed.a066970.
- Wayne, E. J. (7 December 1963). "Alcohol and Road Accidents". Br Med J. 2 (5370): 1467. doi:10.1136/bmj.2.5370.1467. PMC 1873518. PMID 14063057.

=== Books ===
- Clinical aspects of iodine metabolism. Oxford: Blackwell Scientific Publications. 1964.
