= Regius Professor of Medicine and Therapeutics =

The Regius Chair of Medicine and Therapeutics is considered the oldest chair at the University of Glasgow, Scotland. It was formed in 1989 from the merge of the Regius Chairs of the Practice of Medicine (founded in 1637) and of Materia Medica (founded in 1831). The chair has so far had two occupants, Professor John Reid, who was previously Regius Professor of Materia Medica and - since 2010 - Professor Anna Felicja Dominiczak, the first woman to have ever held the post.

== Regius Professor of the Practice of Medicine ==
The Chair of the Practice of Medicine was founded in 1637 and, after a lapse, revived in 1712. It was endowed by Queen Anne in 1713, becoming the Regius Chair.

=== Practice of Medicine Professors ===
- Robert Mayne MA (1637–1646)

=== Practice of Medicine Regius Professors ===
- John Johnstoun MD (1714)
- William Cullen MD (1751)
- Robert Hamilton (1756)
- Joseph Black MD (1757)
- Alexander Stevenson MD (1766)
- Thomas Charles Hope MD FRS (1789)
- Robert Freer FRSE MA MD (1796)
- Charles Badham MA MD FRS (1827)
- William Thomson MD (1841)
- John MacFarlane (1852)
- Sir William Tennant Gairdner KCB MD LLD FRS (1862)
- Sir Thomas McCall Anderson MD (1900)
- Samson Gemmell (1908)
- Thomas Kirkpatrick Monro MA MD LLD (1913)
- Sir John William McNee DSO MD DSc LLD (1936)
- Sir Edward Johnson Wayne MSc MD PhD (1953)
- Graham Malcolm Wilson MD DSc (1967)
- Professor Sir Abraham Goldberg KB MD DSc FRCP FRSE (1978–1989)

== Regius Professor of Materia Medica ==
The Regius Chair of Materia Medica was founded in 1831 by King William IV from the lectureship in Materia Medica, instituted in 1766.

=== Materia Medica Regius Professors ===
- Richard Millar (1831)
- John Couper (1833)
- John Black Cowan (1865)
- Matthew Charteris FRSE (1880)
- Ralph Stockman (1897)
- Noah Morris (1937)
- Stanley Alstead (1948)
- Professor Sir Abraham Goldberg (1970)
- John Low Reid (1978)

== Medicine and Therapeutics Regius Professors ==
- John Low Reid BD DM FRCP FRSE FMedSci (1989–2010)
- Anna Felicja Dominiczak, OBE, FRCP, FRSE, FAHA, FMedSci (2010-)

== See also ==
- List of Professorships at the University of Glasgow
