= Thomas Monro =

Thomas Monro may refer to:

- Thomas Monro (art collector) (1759–1833), British art collector, patron and physician
- Thomas Monro (writer) (1764–1815), English cleric and writer
- Thomas Kirkpatrick Monro (1865–1958), professor of medicine
