= Thomas Martin of Palgrave =

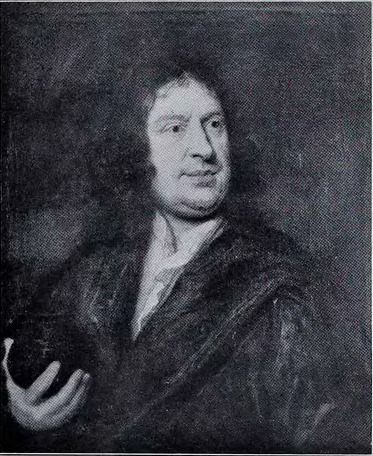
- portrait by Thomas Bardwell
- Born: 8 March 1697; Thetford
- Died: 7 March 1771 (aged 73)
- Occupation: Antiquarian

Thomas Martin FSA (8 March 1696/7 – 7 March 1771), known as "Honest Tom Martin of Palgrave", was an antiquarian and lawyer.

== Early life ==
Martin was born at Thetford in the school house of St. Mary's parish, which is the only parish of that town situated in the county of Suffolk. He was son of William Martin, rector of Great Livermere, Suffolk, and of St Mary's, Thetford, by his wife Elizabeth, only daughter of Thomas Burrough of Bury St. Edmunds, and aunt to Sir James Burrough, master of Caius College, Cambridge.

Martin was largely self-taught, having had a neglected education. For many years he was the only pupil at the Thetford free school, being left to read on his own. He took an early interest in antiquities. In 1710 Thetford was visited by the elderly Peter Le Neve, Norroy King of Arms and first President of the revived Society of Antiquaries. Le Neve sought a guide to the many antiquities of the town only to be told that no-one knew more than thirteen-year-old Master Martin. This began a close friendship between the learned old man and the teenage boy lasting until the death of the former in 1729.

Martin soon afterwards became clerk in the office of his brother Robert, who practised as an attorney in that town. According to notes by Martin, dated 1715, he disliked this employment, and regretted that want of means had prevented him from going to Cambridge University.

== Antiquarian ==
In 1722 he was still at Thetford, but in 1723 he was settled at Palgrave, Suffolk, where he passed the remainder of his life. He was a student of topography and antiquities, became a member of the Spalding Gentlemen's Society, and was admitted a fellow of the Society of Antiquaries, at the same time as Martin Folkes, on 17 February 1720. Cole, who often met him at Sir James Burrough's lodge at Caius College, and who had also been at his house at Palgrave, said, "he was a blunt, rough, honest, downright man; of no behaviour or guile; often drunk in a morning with strong beer, and for breakfast, when others had tea or coffee, he had beefsteak or other strong meat. . . . His thirst after antiquities was as great as his thirst after liquors". His great desire was not only to be esteemed, but to be known and distinguished by the name of "Honest Tom Martin of Palgrave". For many years his "hoary hairs were the crown of glory for the anniversary of the Society of Antiquaries," of which he was so long the senior fellow (Gent. Mag. 1779, p. 411).

His house at Palgrave was pulled down in 1860. It was large, with central entrance, and thirteen windows in front looking towards the village church.

== Wives and family ==
By his first wife, Sarah, widow of Thomas Cropley, and daughter of John Tyrrel of Thetford, he had eight children, of whom two died early; she died in 1731, a few days after having given birth to twins. Soon afterward he married Frances, widow of Peter Le Neve, Norroy king-of-arms, then living at Great Witchingham, Norfolk. He had been acting as one of Le Neve's two executors, the other executor Thomas Tanner having recently been made a bishop and moved to his new diocese at St Asaph. By his marriage with the widow Martin illegally came into the possession of a collection of English antiquities and pictures intended by Le Neve for donation to a public institution. By his second wife he had four children, Samuel, Peter, Matthew, and Elizabeth.

== Further acquisitions ==
The Le Neve collection of historical books and manuscripts relating to the county of Norfolk, which Martin misappropriated, has been described by Richard Gough as 'the greatest fund of antiquities for his native county that ever was collected for any single one in the kingdom'. This collection was supplemented by Martin during his remaining years, notably by the acquisition of the collections of Francis Blomefield in 1753. Blomefield's manuscripts included the Paston Letters.

== Financial troubles and death ==
Martin was a good lawyer, but he gradually lost his practice. Money troubles meant that he was obliged to sell many of his books and some of his manuscript collections. He died at Palgrave on 7 March 1771, and was buried, with others of his family, in the porch of the parish church, where a small mural monument of white marble, with an English inscription, was erected by his friend Sir John Fenn.

== Legacy of his collections ==
John Worth, chemist, of Diss, advertised in 1774 proposals for publishing a history of Thetford, compiled from Martin's papers by Mr. Davis, a dissenting minister, of Diss, and five sheets of the work were actually printed by Crouse of Norwich. The project was stopped by Worth's sudden death, and the manuscript was purchased by Thomas Hunt, bookseller, of Harleston, Norfolk; who subsequently sold it, together with the undigested materials, copyright, and plates, to Richard Gough. Gough published the work under the title of The History of the Town of Thetford, London, 1779. Prefixed is a portrait of Martin engraved by P. S. Lamborn, at the expense of John Ives, from a painting by T. Bardwell. A copy of this, engraved by P. Audinet, is in Nichols's Illustrations of Literature. A memoir of Martin was communicated by Sir John Cullam; the public were indebted to Francis Grose for a new set of the plates; and the coins were arranged by Benjamin Bartlett.

Martin's lack of money obliged him to dispose of books, with manuscript notes, to Thomas Payne, in 1769. A catalogue of his remaining library was printed after his death, at Lynn, in 1771. Worth purchased it, with his other collections, for £600. The printed books he immediately sold to Booth & Berry of Norwich, who disposed of them in a catalogue, 1773. The pictures and lesser curiosities Worth sold by auction at Diss; part of the manuscripts in London, in April 1773, by Samuel Baker; and in a second sale there, in May 1774, manuscripts, scarce books, deeds, grants, pedigrees, drawings, prints, coins, and curiosities. What remained on the death of Worth, consisting chiefly of the papers relating to Thetford, Bury, and the county of Suffolk, were purchased by Thomas Hunt, who sold many of them to private purchasers. Richard Gough had the Bury papers. The dispersion was completed by the sale of Ives's collection in London, in March 1777, he having been a principal purchaser at each previous one.

Two volumes, almost entirely in Martin's handwriting, with some notes of Blomefield, Ives, and others, by 1893 came into the possession of G. G. Milner-Gibson Cullum of Hardwick House, Suffolk. These volumes, containing notes on about 235 Suffolk churches, were purchased by Sir John Cullum, author of the History of Hawstead and Hardwick, from John Topham the antiquary in 1777. In addition to these Cullum had a thin notebook on some Norfolk churches; and some of Martin's notes passed to the family of Mills of Saxham. Another volume of Martin's notes was sold with the books of John Gough Nichols, and is in the library of the Suffolk Institute of Archaeology. There was in the British Museum a copy of Gough's Anecdotes of British Topography, 1768, with copious manuscript notes by Martin. Many of his letters are printed in Nichols's Literary Anecdotes (ix. 413 et seq.)

At the sale of William Upcott's manuscripts, Sir John Fenn's Memoirs of the Life of Thomas Martin was purchased by Sir Thomas Phillipps.
