= Alexander Stuart Frere =

English publisher

Alexander Stuart Frere CBE (born Frere-Reeves; 23 November 1892 – 3 October 1984) was an English publisher who was highly influential in the interwar and post-Second World War period. He was chairman of the board of William Heinemann Ltd and helped guide some of the century's most significant authors to worldwide prominence.

== Early life and education ==
Alexander Frere-Reeves was born in Dulwich, then part of Surrey, the son of Alexander Wilfred Reeves and Mary Stewart Frere. His mother was the daughter of Henry Tobias Frere, a first-class cricketer. He was known as Alexander Stuart Frere from a young age, and in 1939, he officially dropped "Reeves" from the family surname.

He read economics at Christ's College, Cambridge, where he was editor of the literary magazine Granta.

== Wartime service ==
In 1914, during the First World War, Frere joined the Royal East Kent Yeomanry. He fought in the Gallipoli Campaign in 1915, and in 1916 transferred to the Royal Flying Corps. After his plane crashed in 1917, he was invalided out of service and attended Cambridge.

During the Second World War, Frere worked firstly in the organisation of the National Service Campaign at the Ministry of Labour, and from 1940 to 1944 was Director of Public Relations at the Ministry of Labour and National Service. He worked closely with Ernest Bevin, who became a close friend. For his war service, he was appointed a Commander of the Order of the British Empire (CBE) in the 1946 New Year Honours, and was also made a Chevalier of the Legion of Honour in France.

== Career ==
After Cambridge, Frere worked as a journalist for the London Evening News until he was recruited by Doubleday in 1923 to join its subsidiary William Heinemann Ltd.

In 1929, he became managing editor at Heinemann, where he would nurture works from some of the greatest English-language writers of the 20th century, including Graham Greene, Thomas Wolfe, Sinclair Lewis, Somerset Maugham, D. H. Lawrence, Michael Arlen, Nevil Shute, Noël Coward, John Steinbeck, Georgette Heyer, Anthony Powell, and Eric Ambler.

He developed strong friendships with many prominent authors, including Richard Aldington, the best man at his wedding, and J. B. Priestley, godfather to his son, Toby.

He resigned as chairman of the company when it was taken over by Thomas Tilling Ltd in 1961, though he briefly served as president of the company and finally retired in 1962.

Frere had a flair for detecting talent, and encouraging it, and the gift of establishing friendships with the people he liked and respected, among whom were most of his authors. He prided himself on publishing authors rather than books only.

— The Times, 6 October 1984

== Personal life ==
In 1920, Frere began an affair with the married Elizabeth von Arnim, nearly 30 years his senior.

In 1927, he married journalist Patricia Marion Caldecott Wallace, the daughter of writer Edgar Wallace. They had two sons, Alexander and Vice Admiral Sir Toby Frere, and a daughter, Elizabeth Frere Jones, who moved to Brooklyn, New York.

Through his daughter, Elizabeth, he was the grandfather of Tobias Frere-Jones and Sasha Frere-Jones.

Frere was a freemason who served as Frere President of the Board of General Purposes (1959–1972), of the United Grand Lodge of England.

He died in hospital in Kent, aged 91, of complications after undergoing surgery for a broken hip sustained in a fall.
