= John Black Cowan =

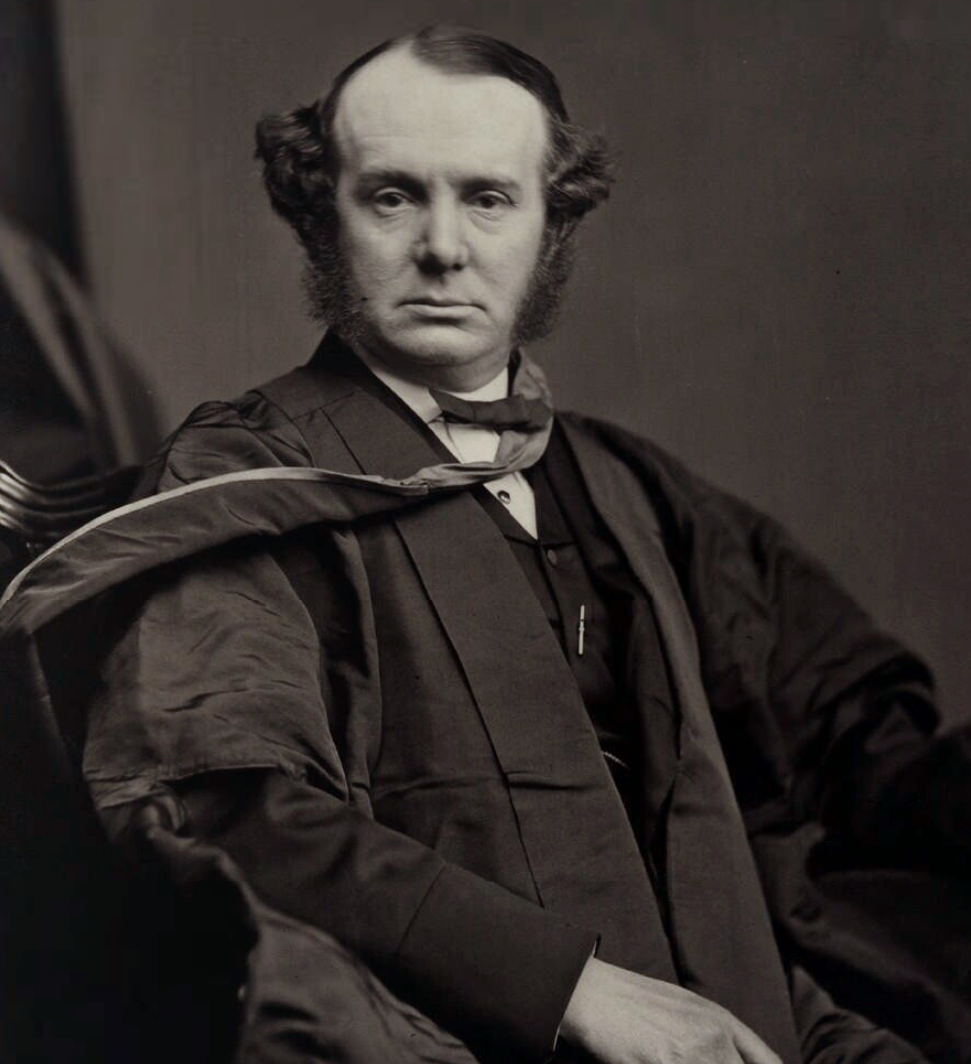
John Black Cowan

John Black Cowan (1828–1896) was Regius Professor of Materia Medica at the University of Glasgow.
