= Star Trek: The Ultimate Voyage =

2016–17 concert tour

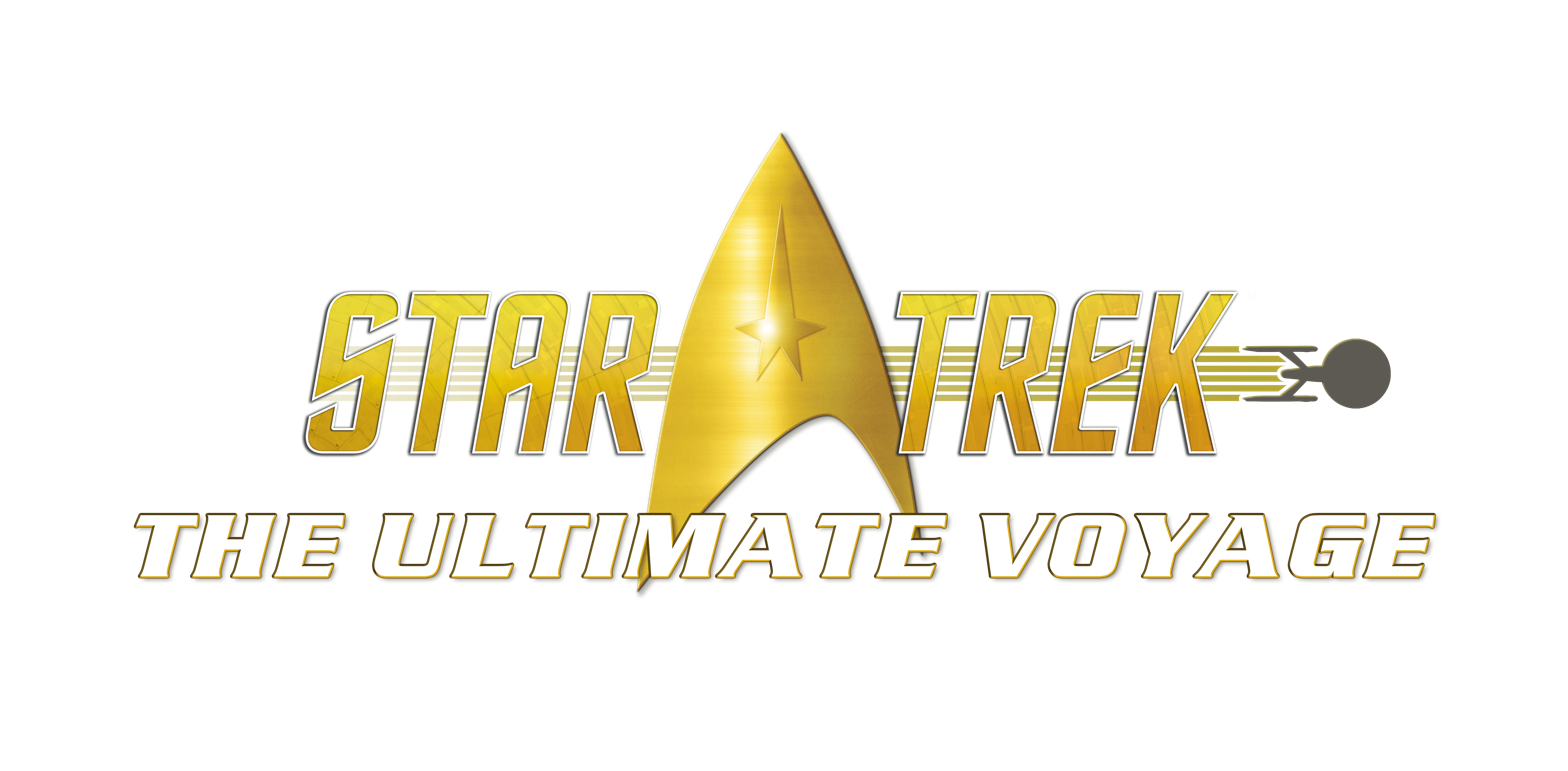
Star Trek: The Ultimate Voyage logo

Star Trek: The Ultimate Voyage is a multimedia concert experience featuring music and video footage from Star Trek motion pictures, television series, and video games in honor of franchise's 50th anniversary. The initial concert tour from 2015 to 2016 performed in 100 cities in North America and Europe and generally received positive reviews. The concerts series was produced by CineConcerts, a production company specializing in live music experiences performed with visual media.

== 2015–2016 Tour ==
The concert toured through the United Kingdom, Canada, and the United States from November 1, 2015, to October 29, 2016. All performances were performed by The Czech National Symphony. Producer and CineConcerts Founder Justin Freer was the main conductor and musical director of the tour while Nicholas Buc and John Jesensky were guest conductors. Composers Ron Jones & Jay Chattaway appeared at the world premiere performance on November 1, 2015, at Royal Albert Hall in London.

One notable performance was in Los Angeles at the Pantages Theater April 1–2, 2016, which featured original composers Dennis McCarthy, Jay Chattaway, and Mark McKenzie as guest conductors. Nichelle Nichols was also in attendance.

== Concept and creation ==
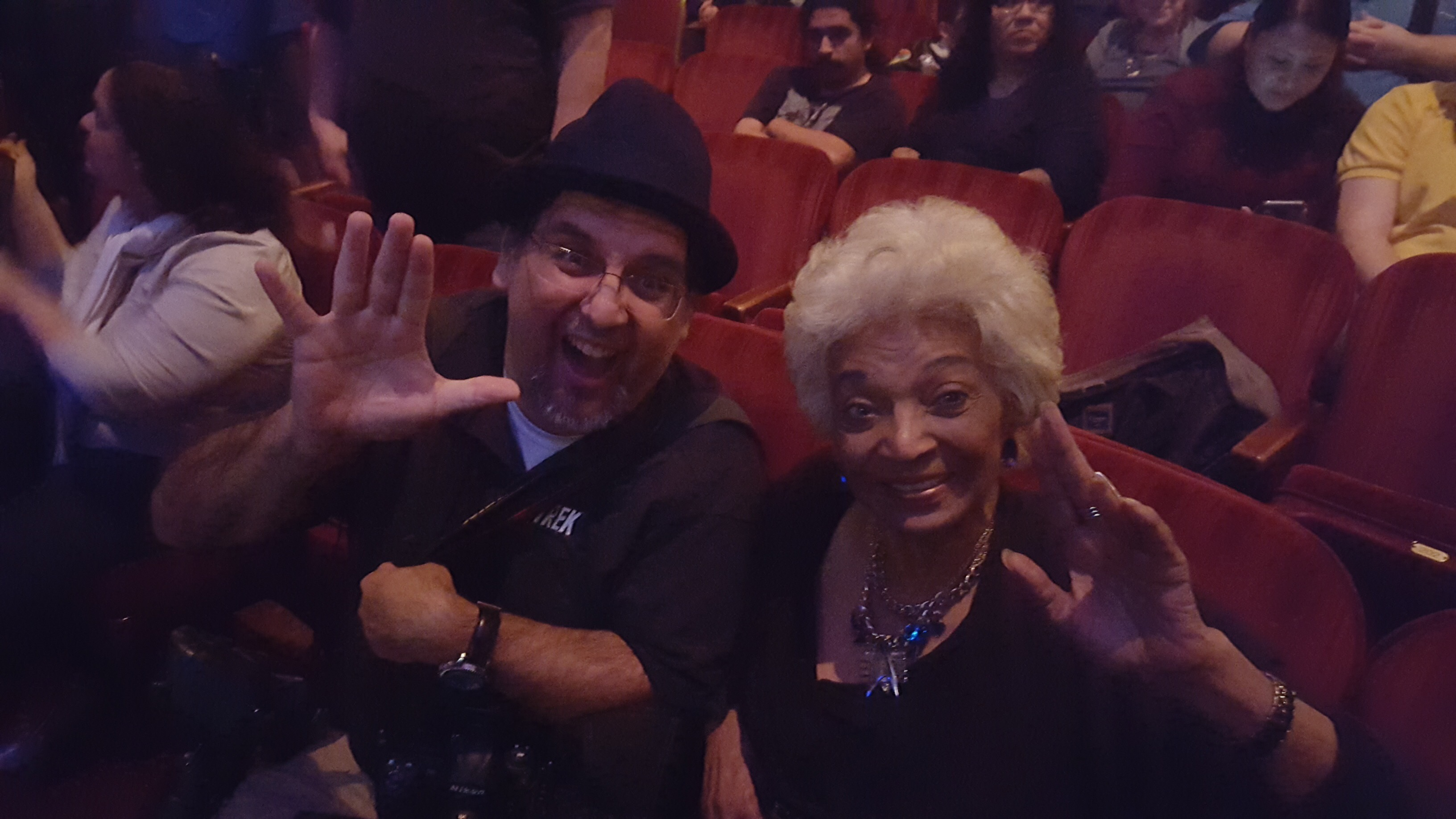
Nichelle Nichols at the Star Trek: Ultimate Voyage performance in 2016 at the Pantages Theater.

The concert features music from the first 50 years of Star Trek and does not include music from any franchise installments, film or television, post 2005. Writer & producer Brady Beaubien described the genesis of the concert was, “To create an experience as a fan and for fans that celebrated the franchise in a way that people may not have seen before.”

Jerry Goldsmith composed the score for Star Trek: The Motion Picture (1979). Having been Gene Roddenberry's initial choice to compose the original Star Trek pilot "The Cage" yet being unable to do so due to scheduling conflicts, Goldsmith was the first pick of both Paramount Pictures and director Robert Wise to compose a score for The Motion Picture. His score for The Motion Picture earned him Academy Award and Golden Globe Award nominations, and was one of the AFI's 250 nominees for the top twenty-five American film scores. Goldsmith would later compose the scores for Star Trek V: The Final Frontier (1989) (which included a revised arrangement of the theme from The Motion Picture), Star Trek: First Contact (1996), Star Trek: Insurrection (1998), and Star Trek: Nemesis (2002), as well as the theme to the television series Star Trek: Voyager in 1995. In addition, his theme for The Motion Picture, as arranged by Dennis McCarthy, was reused as the theme for Star Trek: The Next Generation in 1987.

Producer and Head Conductor Justin Freer studied under Goldsmith before his passing in 2004. As Goldsmith’s contributions to the Star Trek franchise over the years were notable, including creating the musical identity for the Klingon race, the concert experience features much of his music.

Freer has stated that, due to his musical ability showcased in The Next Generation episode “The Inner Light,” his favorite captain is Jean-Luc Picard.

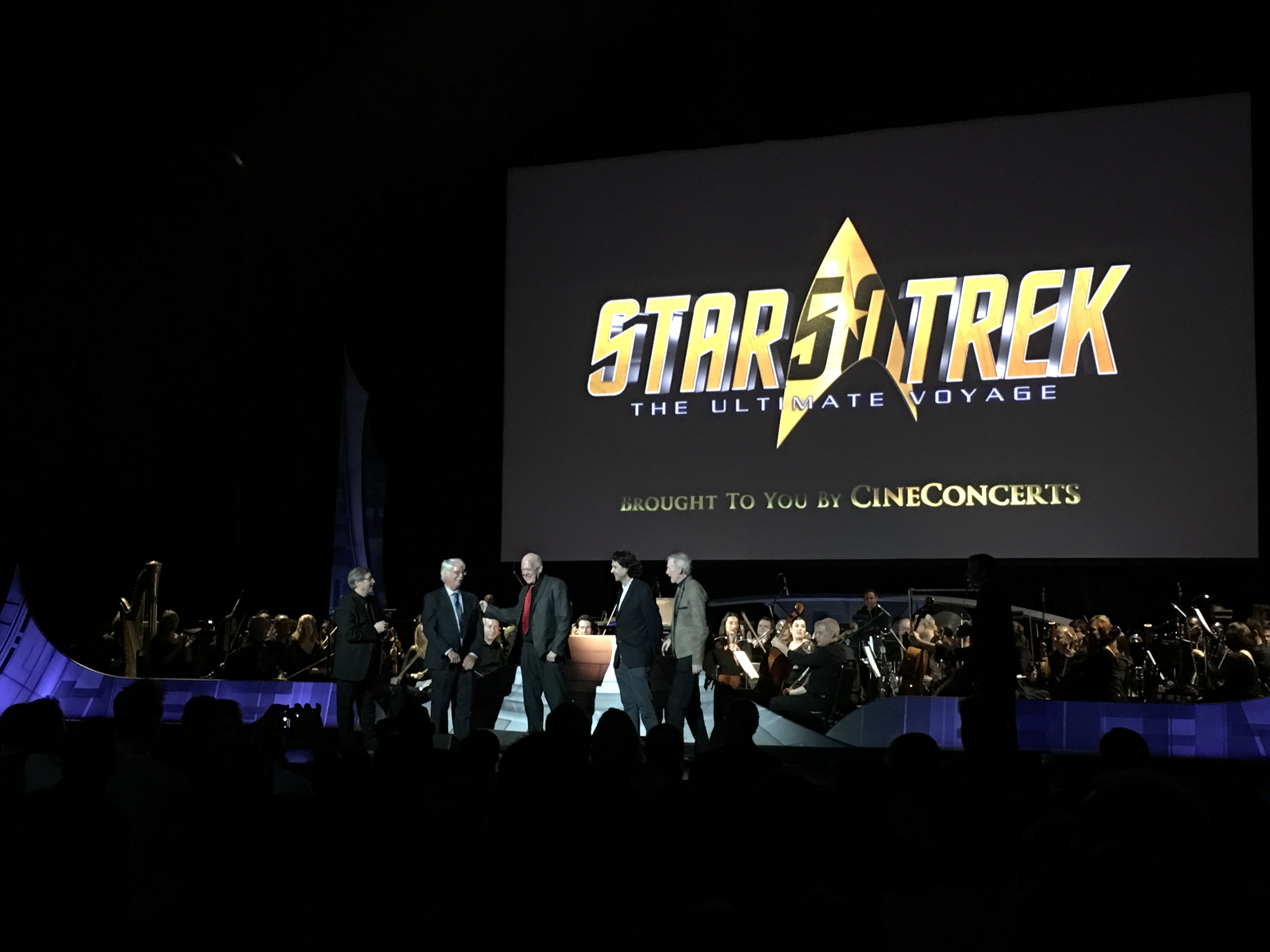
Star Trek: The Ultimate Voyage at the Pantages Theater

== Concert set list ==
=== ACT 1 ===
1. “Main Title” from Star Trek: The Motion Picture - Jerry Goldsmith
2. “Main Title” from Star Trek Generations - Dennis McCarthy
3. “The Enterprise” from Star Trek: The Motion Picture - Jerry Goldsmith
4. “Klingon Battle” from Star Trek: The Motion Picture - Jerry Goldsmith
5. “The Ancient Combat/2nd Kroykah” from Star Trek: The Original Series (S2.E1 “Amok Time”) - Gerald Fried
6. “Ba’Ku Theme” from Star Trek: Insurrection - Jerry Goldsmith
7. “Starship/Kirk’s Philosophy” from Star Trek: The Original Series (S2.E13 “Return to Tomorrow”) - Alexander Courage & George Duning
8. “Kirk Does It Again” from Star Trek: The Original Series (S2.E6 “The Doomsday Machine”) - Sol Kaplan
9. “Main Title” from Star Trek: Deep Space Nine - Dennis McCarthy
10. “Ilia’s Theme” from Star Trek: The Motion Picture - Jerry Goldsmith
11. “Revealed/Reaching Out” from Star Trek: The Next Generation (S1.E1-2 “Encounter at Farpoint”) - Dennis McCarthy
12. “Courage/Saved Again” from Star Trek: The Next Generation (S7.E25-26 “All Good Things”) - Dennis McCarthy
13. “Main Title” from Star Trek: Voyager - Jerry Goldsmith
14. “Main Title” from Star Trek IV: The Voyage Home - Leonard Rosenman
15. “Red Alert” from Star Trek: First Contact - Jerry Goldsmith
16. “Captain Borg” from Star Trek: The Next Generation (S3.E26 “The Best of Both Worlds, Part I”) - Ron Jones

=== Intermission ===
- The first act is followed by a twenty-minute intermission.

=== ACT 2 ===
1. “Opening” from Star Trek: Starfleet Academy video game - Ron Jones
2. “Epilogue and End Title” from Star Trek II: The Wrath of Khan - James Horner
3. “First Contact” from Star Trek: First Contact - Jerry Goldsmith
4. “Defiant Ending” from Star Trek: Deep Space Nine (S7.E20 “The Changing Face of Evil”) - Jay Chattaway
5. “I Can Live With It” from Star Trek: Deep Space Nine (S6.E19 “In The Pale Moonlight”) - David Bell
6. “The Inner Light Suite” from Star Trek: The Next Generation (S5.E25 “Inner Light”) - Jay Chattaway
7. “Set Course For Home” from Star Trek: Voyager (S1.E1-2 “Caretaker”) - Jay Chattaway
8. “Enterprising Young Men” from Star Trek - Michael Giacchino
9. “The Captain” from Star Trek: Voyager (S4.E8-9 “Year of Hell”) - Dennis McCarthy
10. “End Credits Suite” from Star Trek VI: The Undiscovered Country - Cliff Eidelman
11. “Up Your Alley” from Star Trek: Enterprise (S2.E20 “Horizon”) - Mark McKenzie
12. “Archer’s Speech” from Star Trek: Enterprise (S4/E21 “Terra Prime”) - Jay Chattaway
13. “Overture” from Star Trek Generations - Dennis McCarthy
14. “To Live Forever” from Star Trek Generations - Dennis McCarthy
15. “Main Theme” from Star Trek: The Original Series - Alexander Courage

== Soundtrack album ==
There is a digital album of the concert that is not only streaming on all streaming platforms but also available for purchase in digital form on their website. This includes liner notes as well.

== Film and television soundtracks overview ==
Television
	TItle	Dates	Composer	Type	Genre	Timeline
1	The Original Series	September 8, 1966 – June 3, 1969	Alexander Courage	Theme	Soundtrack	The Original Series
2	The Animated Series	September 8, 1973 – October 12, 1974	Ray EllisNorm Prescott	Theme	Soundtrack	The Original Series
3	The Next Generation	September 28, 1987 – May 23, 1994	Jerry Goldsmith	Theme	Soundtrack	The Next Generation
4	Deep Space Nine	January 3, 1993 – June 2, 1999	Dennis McCarthy	Theme	Soundtrack	The Next Generation
5	Voyager	January 16, 1995 – May 23, 2001	Jerry Goldsmith	Theme	Soundtrack	The Next Generation
6	Enterprise	September 26, 2001 – May 13, 2005	Dennis McCarthy	Theme	Soundtrack	Prequel

Film
	Title	Dates	Composer	Genre	Timeline
1	Star Trek: The Motion Picture	December 7, 1979	Jerry Goldsmith	Soundtrack	The Original Series
2	Star Trek II: The Wrath of Khan	June 4, 1982	James Horner	Soundtrack	The Original Series
3	Star Trek III: The Search for Spock	June 1, 1984	James Horner	Soundtrack	The Original Series
4	Star Trek IV: The Voyage Home	November 26, 1986	Leonard Rosenman	Soundtrack	The Original Series
5	Star Trek V: The Final Frontier	June 9, 1989	Jerry Goldsmith	Soundtrack	The Original Series
6	Star Trek VI: The Undiscovered Country	December 6, 1991	Cliff Eidelman	Soundtrack	The Original Series
7	Star Trek Generations	November 18, 1994	Dennis McCarthy	Soundtrack	The Next Generation
8	Star Trek: First Contact	November 22, 1996	Jerry Goldsmith, Joel Goldsmith	Soundtrack	The Next Generation
9	Star Trek: Insurrection	December 11, 1998	Jerry Goldsmith	Soundtrack	The Next Generation
10	Star Trek: Nemesis	December 13, 2002	Jerry Goldsmith	Soundtrack	The Next Generation
11	Star Trek	May 8, 2009	Michael Giacchino	Soundtrack	Remake

== See also ==
- Star Trek: The Music
