= John Fenn (antiquarian) =

English antiquarian (1739–1794)

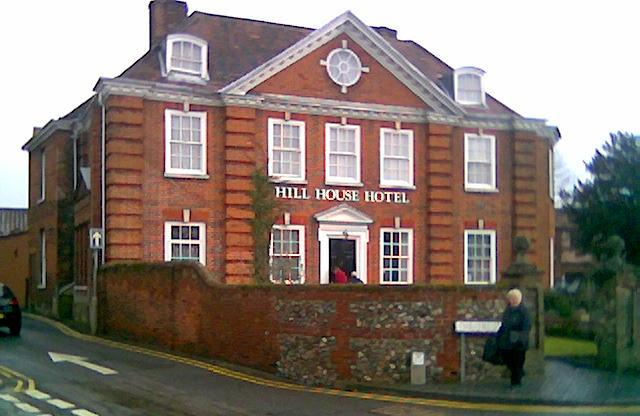
Fenn's home in Dereham, Norfolk, now a hotel

Sir John Fenn (26 November 1739 – 14 February 1794) was an English antiquary. He is best remembered for collecting, editing, and publishing the Paston Letters, describing the life and political scheming of the gentry in Medieval England. He was also a justice of the peace who served as High Sheriff of Norfolk for 1791/2.

== Life ==
Fenn was born 26 November 1739, the son of a surgeon, and was educated at the grammar schools of Scarning and Bottisdale (Botesdale) from which he was admitted to Caius College, Cambridge. At university he became friends with John Frere, and in 1763 he courted his sister Ellenor. They married 1 January 1766 and went to live at Dereham in Norfolk. (Ellenor Fenn was subsequently the author of children's books, under the pseudonyms of Mrs Teachwell and Mrs Lovechild.) After their marriage the couple lived in Dereham. They had no children, but brought up an orphaned heiress and later their nephew, William Frere. Alongside his antiquarian activities, Fenn devoted much effort to management of the tenants of his estates in Edgefield, Foulsham, and Themelthorpe, as well as numerous visits to historical sites and the theatre. Between 1768 and 1775 Fenn helped William Whittingham to publish the remaining parts of the continuation of Francis Blomefield's History of Norfolk. He also became friendly with the antiquary Thomas Martin of Palgrave, and after the latter's death in 1772 assisted in cataloguing many of the latter's manuscripts prior to their sale. It was at this time that he acquired the Paston Letters.

The first two volumes of Fenn's edition of the famous letters appeared in January 1787, dedicated to King George III, and caused a literary sensation. Fenn received a knighthood after presenting the originals to the king in May 1787. A third and fourth volume were published in May 1789, but further progress was delayed by his appointment as High Sheriff of Norfolk for 1791. Work on the final volume of letters was almost complete when he died, on 14 February 1794, but a planned biography of the Pastons was never completed.

He was buried with his wife at the Frere family's church of St Bartholomew, Finningham, Suffolk, where there was erected a significant marble monument to them both by John Bacon.
