= Frier =

Frier may refer to:

== Places ==
- Frier, also known as the Frierfjord, a fjord in Telemark, Norway

== People ==
Frier is a surname of Germanic origin.

- Annette Frier (born 1974), German actress and comedian
- Helga Frier (1893–1972), Danish actress
- Lena Frier Kristiansen (born 1983), Danish badminton player
- Mike Frier (born 1969), American football player
- Pierre André Frier (1836- 1869), French military
- Julien Frier (born 1974), French rugby player
- T. J. Frier (born 1977), American football player

== See also ==
- Freier
- Fryar
- Fryer
- Friar
- Freer (disambiguation)
