= John Reid (pharmacologist) =

British clinical pharmacologist

John Reid OBE, FRCP, FRCPGlas, FRSE, FMedSci
- Born: John Low Reid; 1943 (age 82–83)
- Died: 07/06/2026
- Education: University of Oxford
- Employers: Royal Postgraduate Medical School; University of Glasgow
- Spouse: Randa
- Children: 2

John Low Reid OBE, FRCP, FRCPGlas, FRSE, FMedSci (born 1943) is a British clinical pharmacologist.

Reid graduated in medicine from the University of Oxford, then completed his training in clinical pharmacology at the Royal Postgraduate Medical School, where he was subsequently a senior lecturer and reader. He also undertook a Medical Research Council travelling fellowship to the United States' National Institutes of Health.

He became Regius professor of materia medica and therapeutics at the University of Glasgow in 1978, changing to being Regius chair of medicine and head of the department of medicine and therapeutics, in 1989.

He has served as president of the Association of Physicians of Great Britain and Ireland; of the British Society of Hypertension; and of European Society of Hypertension.

He was made an Officer of the Order of the British Empire (OBE) in the 2001 New Year Honours.
