= Frear =

Frear is a surname. Notable people with the surname include:

- Alexander Frear (1820–1882), American politician
- Bryan Frear (1933–1997), English professional footballer
- Caz Frear, British novelist
- Elliott Frear (born 1990), footballer who is currently playing for Conference Premier side Forest Green Rovers
- James A. Frear (1861–1939), U.S. Representative from Wisconsin
- J. Allen Frear Jr. (1903–1993), American businessman and politician
- Joseph Frear (builder) (1846–1926), New Zealand builder and businessman
- Mary Dillingham Frear (1870–1951), First Lady of the Territory of Hawaii
- Scott Frear, American football coach in the United States and Finland
- Walter F. Frear (1863–1948), lawyer and judge in the Kingdom of Hawaii and Republic of Hawaii

== See also ==
- Frear Park, urban park in the city of Troy, New York
- Freear, surname
- Freer (disambiguation)
