= Palgrave, Suffolk =

Village in Suffolk, England

Coordinates: 52.36298°N 1.10756°E

Palgrave
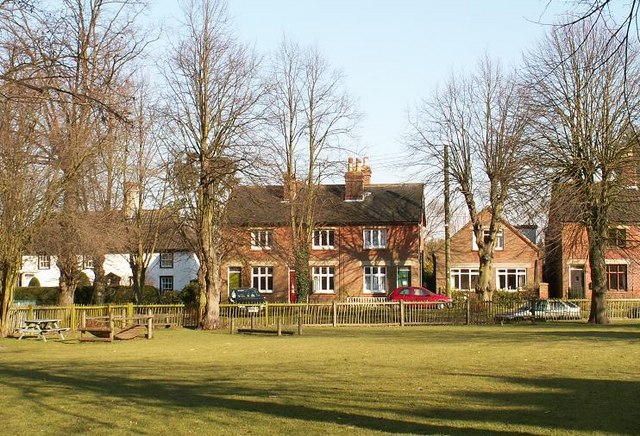
- Palgrave Village Green

- Location within Suffolk
- Population: 905 (2011 census)
- Civil parish: Palgrave
- District: Mid Suffolk
- Shire county: Suffolk
- Region: East
- Country: England
- Sovereign state: United Kingdom
- Post town: DISS
- Postcode district: IP22
- Dialling code: 01379
- Police: Suffolk
- Fire: Suffolk
- Ambulance: East of England
- UK Parliament: Central Suffolk and North Ipswich

Palgrave is a village and civil parish in the Mid Suffolk district of Suffolk in eastern England. It is located on the south bank of the River Waveney, opposite Diss in Norfolk and adjacent to the Great Eastern Main Line.

Palgrave has a small primary school, with St Peter's Church located opposite, and is situated approximately 1 mile from Diss. It also has a green, park, pond, and cemetery.

Palgrave had a population of 905 people in 366 households, according to the 2011 Census.

Palgrave shares a significant historical link with its west–east road linking Great Yarmouth in Norfolk and Bury St Edmunds in Suffolk in the Domesday period (circa 1086).

== History ==
In the 1870s, Palgrave was described as:

"Palgrave, a village and a parish in Hartismere district, Suffolk. The village stands near the boundary with Norfolk, 1 mile S w of Diss r. station, and 4 N W of Eye; and has a Wall letter-box under Diss. The parish comprises 1, 474 acres. Real property, £3, 601. Pop., 739. Houses, 160".

The Occupational Structure of Palgrave, Suffolk 1881

The most common occupation found in Palgrave was agriculture, acquired by men over the age of 20 years in 1881. This particular region was found to be ideal for agricultural purposes, due to its location near the River Waverney being a direct source of water. Comparatively, the female population of Palgrave in 1881 shared large proportion of occupations surrounding the domestic and professional roles in the society, accounting for 70% in the professional industry alone as shown in the graph present.

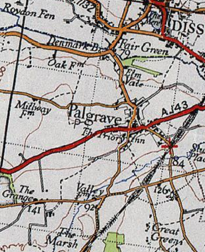
A 20th Century Boundary Map of Palgrave, Suffolk.

However, there is a significant amount of the population of Palgrave that has an unknown occupation, accounting for 17.4% of the total population (124 people) in 1881. This unknown occupational data would make it difficult to establish the overall class of the Palgrave, however it could be understood that the local society around 1881 was of a lower, working class, due to the large proportion of occupations being in labour roles such as agriculture, domestic and craftsmanship.

== Demographics ==
The ethnic composition of Palgrave is largely dominated by the ethnic group listed as 'White; English/Welsh/Scottish/Northern Irish/British', with 871 (96.2%) of the population falling under this category. This is followed by the second most prominent ethnic group listed as 'White; Other White' with 21 (2.3%) of the population. The other ethnic groups in Palgrave could be classed as minorities, which include White; Irish (0.3%), Mixed/Multiple Ethnic Groups; White and Black Caribbean (0.1%), Mixed/Multiple Ethnic Groups; White and Asian (0.5%), Asian/Asian British (0.3%); Other Asian and Black/African/Caribbean/Black British; Caribbean (0.1%).

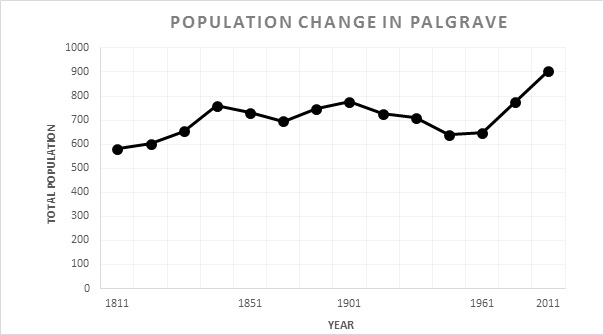
Total Population of Palgrave Civil Parish, Suffolk, as reported by the Census of Population from 1881 to 2011

As the neighbouring graph identifies, the total population of Palgrave from 1811 has fluctuated slightly, but has shown a gradual increase in population from 580 (1811) to 905 (2011). It is clear that a slight dip in the 1961 period saw a rapid increase in the population till 2011 where it reached its peak of 905 people.

There are few religions in Palgrave, with the main religion being Christianity accounting for 62.3% (561 people) of the total population. This is followed by 257 people (28.3%) classed under the 'No Religion' category collated by the 2011 census.

== Education ==
Palgrave has one primary school, Palgrave Church of England Voluntary Controlled Primary School. It has a total of 46 mixed gender pupils ranging from 4–11 years old. Although it is smaller than the average sized primary school, they use the supplements of Palgrave's local community centre, Church and village green to pursue in various activities. Ofsted have classed Palgrave Church of England Voluntary Controlled Primary School as a 'Good' school, when it was last inspected in May 2012.

== Transport and housing ==
There is a total of 378 dwellings in Palgrave according to the 2011 Census report. This is a significant increase when comparing it with the data from 1831, where only 99 households were present in the parish. This increase in housing correlates with the total population increase shown in the graph above, therefore the increase of people living in Palgrave encouraged more houses to be built in the area to satisfy the increasing population.

Palgrave is situated around 1.6 miles from the nearest railway station, which is at Diss. Bus services are operated by Botesdate Parish Council and run once a week, with services towards Diss railway station.

== See also ==
- Thomas Martin of Palgrave
