= Star Trek: The Music =

Star Trek: The Music is conducted by Erich Kunzel of the Cincinnati Pops Orchestra, and hosted/narrated by John de Lancie (Q from The Next Generation, Deep Space Nine and Voyager) and Robert Picardo (The Doctor from Voyager, and Dr. Zimmerman in various episodes of DS9 and VOY).

== First set ==
- Alexander Courage – Suite from "The Menagerie"
- Alexander Courage – Main Theme from "Star Trek" (TV Series)
- Jerry Goldsmith – Main Theme from "Star Trek: The Motion Picture"
- Jerry Goldsmith – Klingon Battle from "Star Trek: The Motion Picture"
- James Horner – Main Title from "Star Trek II: The Wrath of Khan"
- James Horner – Epilogue from "Star Trek II: The Wrath of Khan"
- James Horner – End Credits from "Star Trek II: The Wrath of Khan"
- James Horner – Main Theme from "Star Trek III: The Search for Spock"
- Leonard Rosenman – Main Title from "Star Trek IV: The Voyage Home"

== Second set ==
- Dennis McCarthy/arr. Reineke – Main Theme from "Star Trek: The Next Generation"
- Jerry Goldsmith – A Busy Man from "Star Trek V: The Final Frontier"
- Cliff Eidelman – End Title from "Star Trek VI: The Undiscovered Country"
- Dennis McCarthy/arr. Reineke – Main Theme from "Star Trek: Deep Space Nine"
- Dennis McCarthy/arr. McKenzie – End Title from "Star Trek Generations"
- Jerry Goldsmith/arr. Mann – Main Theme from "Star Trek: Voyager"

== Dates/locations ==
- Star Trek: The Music had its original performances in Dallas, Texas on Tuesday, June 5, 2007, and Wednesday, June 6, 2007 at the Meyerson Symphony Center.
- The second show was performed on June 20 and June 21, 2008, at The Roy Thomson Hall in Toronto, Ontario by the Toronto Symphony Orchestra.
- The third show was in Cincinnati, Ohio on June 28, 2008,
- The fourth show was in Denver, Colorado on November 1, 2008.
- The fifth show was in Calgary, Alberta on January 13 to 15, 2010.
- There were two shows in Kitchener, Ontario on June 2 and 3, 2010 at The Centre In The Square by the Kitchener-Waterloo Symphony.

== Photos ==
=== Toronto ===
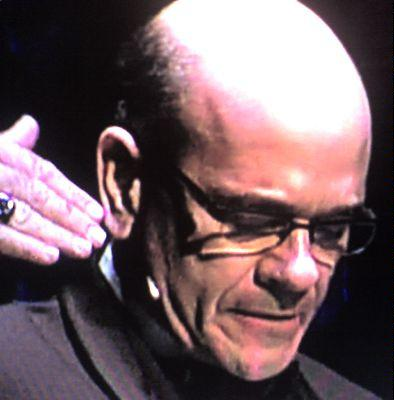
Robert Picardo, narrating during the second "Star Trek: The Music" show.

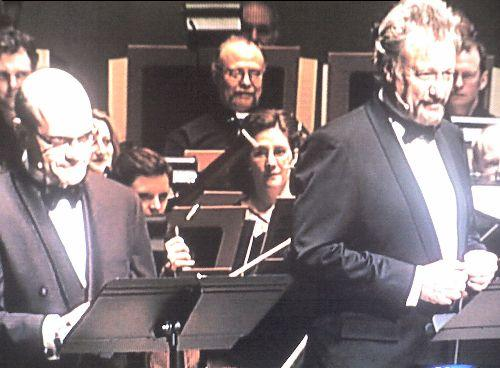
John de Lancie, Robert Picardo, during their second performance of "Star Trek: The Music" narrating.

== See also ==
- Star Trek: The Ultimate Voyage
