= Fryar =

Origin
- Meaning: "one who is a Friar"
- Region of origin: United Kingdom

The surname “Fryar” has its earliest origins in medieval England, first appearing in the 14th century. The name was also found in Lothian where they were seated from early recorded times and their first records appear on the census rolls taken by the early Kings to determine the rate of taxation of their subjects. The name was given to a person who was a friar. The surname Fryar was derived from the old French word "frère", which means "brother" in English and dates from the 13th century. The French word "frère" in turn comes from the Latin word "frater", which also means "brother". One reason for the variation in spelling is that medieval English lacked definite spelling rules. Names were rarely spelled consistently during these times when most people were illiterate. Scribes and church officials recorded names as they sounded, rather than adhering to specific rules and consequently, the variant surname Fryar first appeared.

Fryar is a relatively common surname in Northern Ireland. This was due in part to the significant emigration of influential protestants from England to Northern Ireland following the Battle of the Boyne. Fryars were some of the first immigrants to arrive in North America during the 18th century and Australia in the 19th century. Consequently, the frequency of the surname is now greater in both these two countries compared to its English origin.

== People with the surname ==
- Albert Fryar (1875—1944), Australian philatelist and sportsman
- Chris Fryar (born 1970), American jazz entertainer
- Elmer E. Fryar (1915—1944), American Medal of Honor recipient
- Freddy Fryar (1935–2020), American racing car driver pioneer
- Godfrey Fryar (born 1950), Australian Anglican bishop
- Hal Fryar (1927—2017), American actor and television personality
- Irving Fryar (born 1962), American football player
- Josh Fryar (born 2002), American football player
- Pearl Fryar (1939–2026), American topiary artist
- Samuel Fryar (1863—1938), Irish solicitor and politician
- Steve Fryar (1953—2017), American professional rodeo cowboy
- William Fryar (1828—1912), Australian surveyor and politician

== See also ==
- Frere (surname)
- Freer (disambiguation)
- Fryer (surname)
- Frier (disambiguation)
- Fryars, British musician
