= Toby Frere =

Royal Navy admiral (1938–2020)

Vice Admiral Sir Toby Frere KCB
- Born: Richard Tobias Frere-Reeves; 4 June 1938; Marylebone, London
- Died: 5 March 2020 (aged 81)
- Military career
- Allegiance: United Kingdom
- Branch: Royal Navy
- Service years: 1955–1997
- Rank: Vice admiral
- Awards: Knight Commander of the Order of the Bath

Vice Admiral Sir Richard Tobias Frere KCB (born Frere-Reeves; 4 June 1938 – 5 March 2020) was a Royal Navy officer who ended his career as Chief of Fleet Support.

== Early life and education ==
Frere was born in London, the son of publisher Alexander Stuart Frere-Reeves CBE and Patricia Marion Caldecott Wallace. His mother was the daughter of writer Edgar Wallace. J. B. Priestley was his godfather. He was named after his great-grandfather Henry Tobias Frere, a first-class cricketer. When he was 1, his father legally dropped Reeves from their surname.

He was educated at Eton College and the Royal Naval College, Dartmouth.

== Naval career ==
Frere joined the Royal Naval Volunteer Reserve through National Service in 1955 and was commissioned into the Royal Navy in 1958. During the Cuban Missile Crisis in 1962, as a submariner based at Halifax, he was involved in setting up a barrier patrol with American air support off Newfoundland.

He commanded the submarines HMS Andrew, HMS Odin and HMS Revenge before taking charge of the frigate HMS Brazen. Promoted to Rear-Admiral, he was appointed Director-General, Fleet Support (Policy & Services) in 1988 and then Flag Officer, Submarines and Commander Submarines for the Eastern Atlantic in 1991 before becoming Chief of Fleet Support in 1994 and retiring in 1997.

In retirement, he became the First Chairman of The Prison Service Pay Review Body as well as Chairman of the Governors of Oundle School.

== Family ==
In 1968, he married Jane Barraclough; they had two daughters.

Military offices
Preceded by Sir Neville Purvis	Chief of Fleet Support; 1994-1997	Succeeded by Sir John Dunt
