= Gary Freear =

English cricketer

Personal information
- Full name: Gary David Freear
- Born: 4 May 1982 (age 44); King's Lynn, Norfolk, England
- Batting: Right-handed

Domestic team information
- Years: Team
- 2000–present: Cambridgeshire

Career statistics
Competition	List A
Matches	4
Runs scored	36
Batting average	12.00
100s/50s	0/0
Top score	21
Catches/stumpings	0/–
- Source: CricInfo, 27 April 2011

Gary David Freear (born 4 May 1982) is a former English cricketer. He was a right-handed batsman. He was born in King's Lynn, Norfolk.

Freear made his debut for Cambridgeshire County Cricket Club in the 2000 Minor Counties Championship against Suffolk. In 2001, he made his List A cricket debut against Somerset in the 2001 Cheltenham & Gloucester Trophy. He played three further List A matches for Cambridgeshire, the last coming against Northamptonshire in the 2004 Cheltenham & Gloucester Trophy. He played for Cambridgeshire until the end of the 2014 season.
