= Lionel Frere =

English cricketer

Personal information
- Full name: Lionel Robert Temple Frere
- Born: 10 December 1870; Marylebone, London, England
- Died: 15 March 1936 (aged 65); Kensington, London, England
- Batting: Right-handed
- Role: Wicket-keeper

Domestic team information
- Years: Team
- 1892: Cambridge University
- 1895–1897: Norfolk

Career statistics
Competition	First-class
Matches	1
Runs scored	3
Batting average	1.50
100s/50s	–/–
Top score	2
Catches/stumpings	2/–
- Source: Cricinfo, 14 July 2019

Lionel Robert Temple Frere (10 December 1870 – 15 March 1936) was an English first-class cricketer.

Frere was born at Marylebone in December 1870. He was educated at Haileybury, before going up to Trinity College, Cambridge. While studying at Cambridge, he made a single appearance in first-class cricket for Cambridge University against Surrey at The Oval in 1892. Batting twice in the match, he was dismissed for 2 runs by Bill Lockwood, while in their second-innings he was dismissed by the same bowler for a single run. He later played minor counties cricket for Norfolk from 1895–97, making three appearances in the Minor Counties Championship.

Outside of cricket he also played tennis. He took part in the 1906 West Sussex Championships at East Grinstead, reaching the quarter-finals. In 1908, he took part in the East Cornwall Championship, where he was knocked out in the first round. Frere was a wine merchant by profession. He died at Kensington in March 1936.
