= Pierre André Frier =

French musician (1836–1879)

Pierre André Frier Roche (b. Sassenage, France 1836- Port-au-Prince 1879) was a French military and musician known for his involvement in the military campaigns of Haitian president Fabré Geffrard and the Dominican president Buenaventura Baez during the second half of the 19th century in Hispaniola.

== Biography ==
Pierre André Frier was the son of Jean Antoine Frier (1804-1871) and Rose Agathe Roche (1811-1888). He studied music at the National Conservatory in Paris and before age 20 joined the body of French Zouaves, in which he came to hold the rank of captain. He fought with the zouaves in the Crimean War, and later in the Italian campaign, fighting in the Battle of Magenta and Solferino, being wounded in the latter with a sword inflicted by a member of the Austrian cavalry, which forced him to leave the active service.

== Military Mission in Port-au-Prince ==
On his return to Paris, he was appointed on a mission of military instructors that would go to Haiti at the request of President Fabré Geffrard. Due to his musical culture and formation, Geffrard commissioned him the formation of several military bands.

Frier and President Geffrard developed a close friendship and in his residence he met Asuncion Troncoso Perez, daughter of General Tomas Troncoso and Sinforosa Perez, whom he married in 1860. Troncoso and his family were in Port-au-Prince as exiles of the antinational government of Pedro Santana, whom the general had resisted as head of the Plaza de Santo Domingo during the siege that ended with the overthrow of President Jimenes. In that same year of 1860 his eldest son was born, Emilio Frier Troncoso, who died in infancy, and the following year they gave birth to their second daughter, Rosa Margarita Frier.

== Military Mission in Santo Domingo ==
In early 1864, Frier obtained a license from the Haitian government to move to his homeland with his family and remained there until October 1865, when they sailed back to Haiti, via Curaçao. Late in November, while on the island, a Dominican commission arrived to make known to the general Buenaventura Báez the decree of the Constituent Assembly that had elected him president of the Republic.

Baez insisted that Frier and his family, instead of going to Port-au-Prince, join him and his entourage to Santo Domingo. Asuncion, eager to visit her family, joined instances with Báez and they moved to Santo Domingo in 1865. Later that summer in July 1866, the third child of the marriage, Antonia Francisca Frier, was born.

== Death ==
In late 1866, the family moved back to Port-au-Prince, where Frier continued his work with the military bands, until he died suddenly on 17 March 1879. He had finished his mission and had packed their household to return to France. At the time of his death, his wife Asunción was in a state of their fourth child, Maria Altagracia Frier, who was born in 1870.

== The Frier Family ==
The three surviving daughters of the Frier Troncoso marriage lived forever in Santo Domingo with their mother, who later became known as the "Madame Frier". The oldest, Rosa Margarita Frier (b. 1863), married Ezequiel Perdomo Molina, son of Agustín Perdomo Bello (brother of Col. Angel Perdomo) and Petrona Advíncula Molina. This couple fathered Francisca Altagracia, (b.1883), Emilio Ezequiel (b. 1885), Damian Agustin Clemente (b. 1886) who married Esperanza Guerra (cousin, once removed, of singer Juan Luis Guerra); Tancredo (b.1888), Olimpia Malvina (b. 1889), Mercedes, Américo, and Angelica Perdomo Frier (b. 1904-2000), wife of Horacio Alvarez Savignon (b.1900) founders of Pepsi-Co Dominicana and creators of the Enriquillo soda water in the 1930s, the first Dominican carbonated drink.

The second daughter, Antonia Francisca Frier (b. 1866), married Juan Isidro Ortega Montaño. This marriage gave birth to Miguel Virgilio (b. 1885), Luz Maria (b. 1887), Julio Cesar Ortega Frier (b. 1888) who became a prolific jurist and educator; Luis Anibal (b. 1890), Mercedes Laura (b.1892), mother of painter Gilberto Hernandez Ortega; Antoinette, who died at 13 years of age; and Juan Isidro Ortega Frier.

The youngest, Maria Altagracia Frier (b.1869), married Juan de Dios Tejada who was a native of Santiago de Cuba. They gave birth to Esteban Carlos (b. 1891), Luisa, John and Nellie Tejada Frier.

== The Ville St. Nazaire Tragedy ==
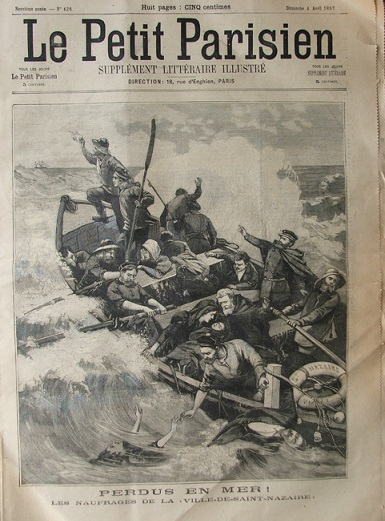
The Shipwreck of Saint Nazaire in the front page of Le Petit Parisien (1897)

Maria Altagracia, the youngest of the Frier sisters, was very close to the Henriquez Urena family. When complications of the disease that took the life of her close friend Salome Urena presented themselves, Maria Altagracia persuaded her husband to travel from New York City to Santo Domingo, for her to take over the care of her mentor and closest friend. They did and on the same day they boarded the steamer Ville St. Nazaire, 6 March 1897, Salome Urena died. The ship which they boarded was discovered to be leaking water and coupled with the impact of a storm that whipped, caused the collapse of the steamer. Of its 83 passengers, only 18 survived.

One of the rescued was Juan de Dios Tejada, who was saved by the schooner Hilda from United States. However, the fate of the rest of the Tejada Frier family was another. The New York Times later confirmed the loss of his entire family. In Santo Domingo, a cenotaph in memory of those Dominicans who perished in the shipwreck was erected in the cemetery of Independence Avenue.
