= Thomas Kirkpatrick Monro =

Scottish physician (1865–1958)

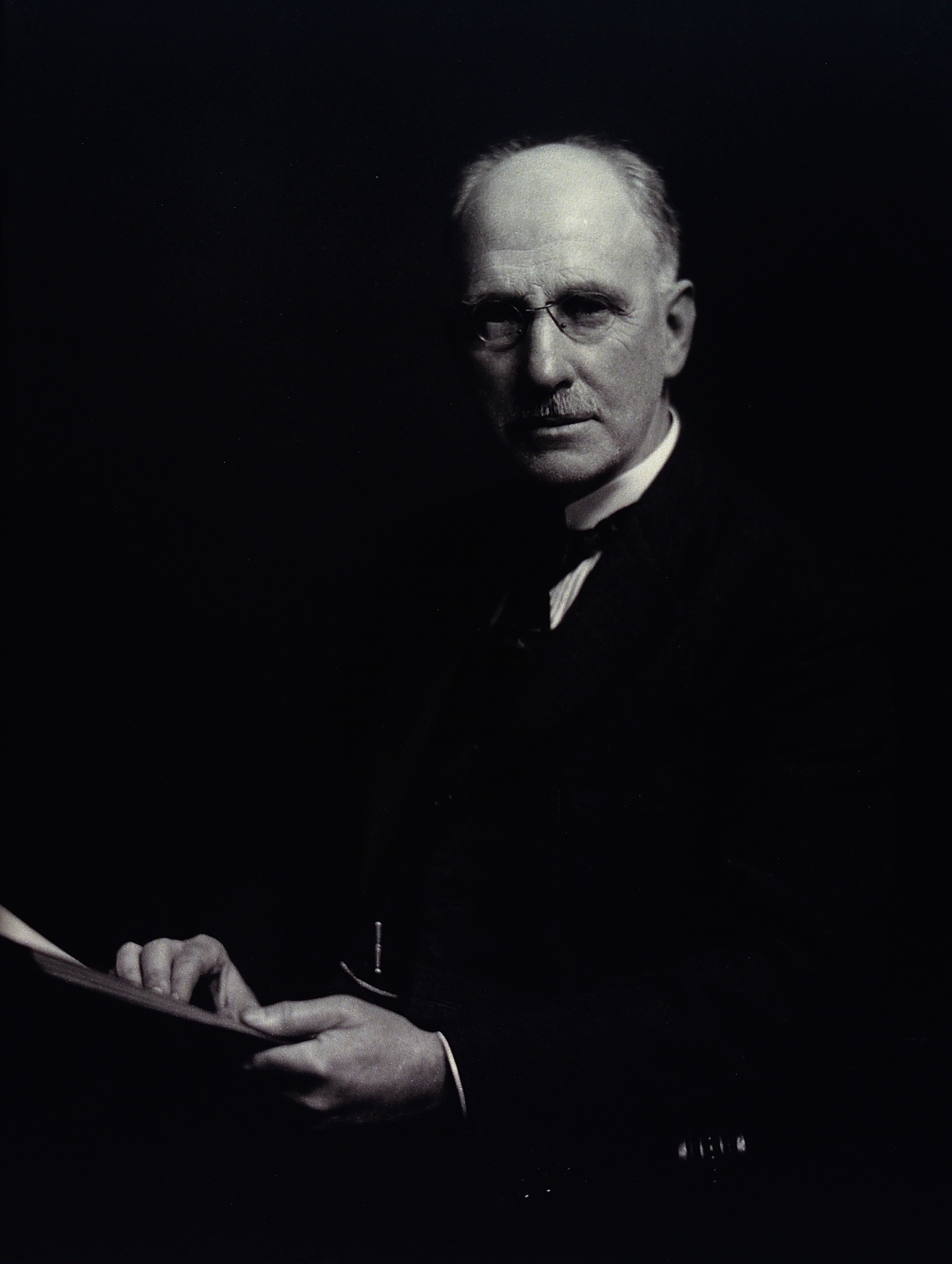
Portrait. Credit: Wellcome Collection

Thomas Kirkpatrick Monro (1865 – 10 January 1958) was Regius Professor of Medicine and Therapeutics at the University of Glasgow.

He was director of Glasgow Royal Maternity and Women's Hospital, professor of medicine and dean of the Medical Faculty at St Mungo's College, senior editor of the Glasgow Medical Journal, and governor of the Royal Technical College. He also served as a major in the Royal Army Medical Corps.

Monro was also an avid bibliophile, bibliographer and book-collector who amassed an almost complete collection of Sir Thomas Browne and served as the President of the Glasgow Bibliographical Society. The Monro Collection is now held in the special collections of the University of Glasgow Library.

== Selected publications ==
- History of the Chronic Degenerative Diseases of the Central Nervous System (1895).
- Manual of Medicine (1903).
- The Early Editions of Sir Thomas Browne (Records of the Glasgow Bibliographical Society, vol. 7, 1918-1920).
- The Physician as a Man of Letters, Science and Action (1933).
