= Louie Freear =

English actress and comedienne (1871–1939)

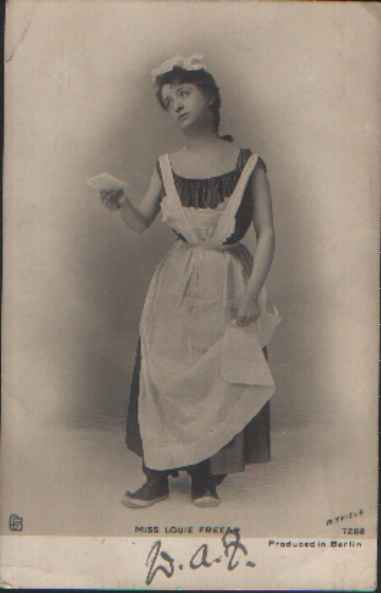
- Born: Louisa Freear; 26 November 1871; Lambeth, London, England
- Died: 23 March 1939 (aged 67); London, England
- Burial place: Brookwood Cemetery
- Other names: Louisa Shepherd
- Occupations: Actress, comedienne

Louisa Freear (26 November 1871 – 23 March 1939) was an English actress and comedienne.

== Biography ==
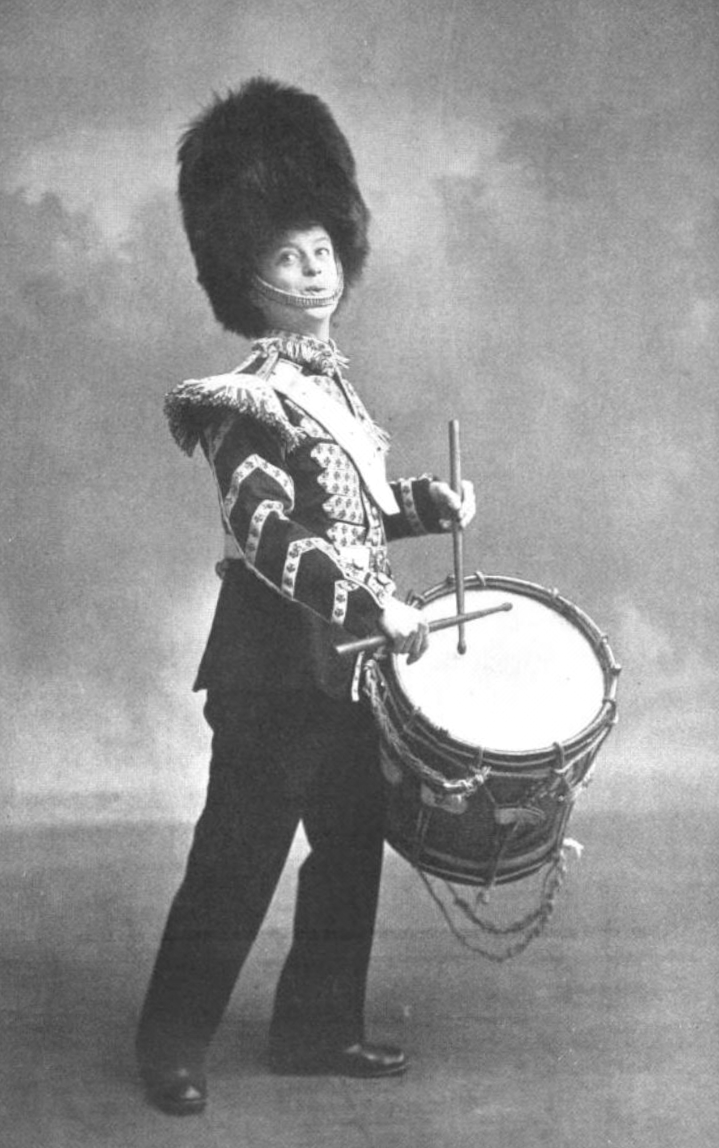
In the title role of Boy Bob in 1899

She was born in Lambeth, London, and was part of the Freear theatrical family; her parents were actor Henry Butler Freear and Mary Jane Freear (née Burke), a vocalist. Her brother Walter Freear was an actor, dancer and comedian, and brother Alfred worked as a musician.

Described as "vital and diminutive", she performed the role Flo Honeydew in The Lady Slavey (1894) and Puck in Herbert Beerbohm Tree's lavish 1900 production of A Midsummer Night's Dream. She was also a success in George Dance's comic opera, A Chinese Honeymoon, in 1901.

In 1912, she married Charles Shepherd. She died at her home London on 23 March 1939, and was buried at Brookwood Cemetery.
