= Frere =

Frere may refer to:

- Frere (surname), surname
- Frere, South Africa, town in the KwaZulu-Natal province of South Africa
- Frere Hall, building in Karachi, Pakistan
- Frere Hospital, hospital situated in East London, Eastern Cape in South Africa
- Frere Town, old name of Mombasa, coastal city in southeastern Kenya
- Mount Frere, town located in the Eastern Cape province of South Africa
