= Albert Freear =

Irish rugby union player (1878–1960)

- Full name: Albert Edward Freear
- Born: 1878 Salford, Lancashire, England
- Died: 25 August 1960 (aged 82) Melbourne, Victoria, Australia

Rugby union career
- Position: Wing
International career
Years	Team	Apps	(Points)
1901	Ireland	3	(3)

Albert Edward Freear (1878 — 1960) was an Irish international rugby union player.

Freear was born in Salford, Lancashire, and educated in Dublin, attending Sandymount Academical Institution.

A wing three-quarter, Freear played for Dublin club Lansdowne, from where he attained his three Ireland caps in the 1901 Home Nations, scoring his only try against Wales at Swansea. He later captained professional rugby league team Hull FC, which he joined in 1904.

Freear was handed a four-month prison sentence by a London court in 1908 on the charge of embezzlement, having pled guilty to stealing money from his employer. He subsequently immigrated to Australia.

== See also ==
- List of Ireland national rugby union players
