= William Frere =

English lawyer and academic

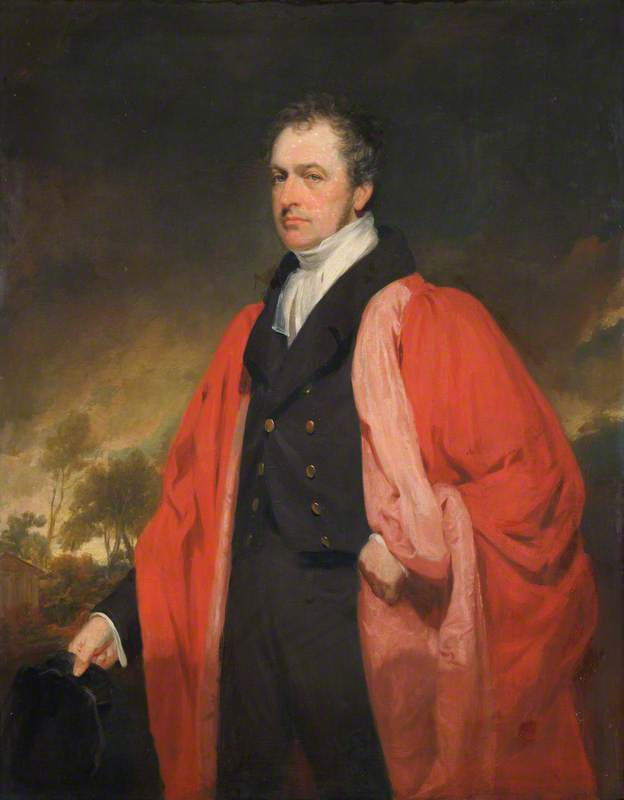
- William Frere by George Clint
- Born: 28 November 1775; Roydon, South Norfolk, England
- Died: 25 May 1836 (aged 60); Cambridgeshire, England
- Education: Felsted School, Essex, England; Trinity College, Cambridge
- Occupations: Lawyer and academic
- Spouse: Mary Dillingham (m. 1810)
- Children: Philip Howard Frere; Augusta Frederica Frere
- Parents: John Frere (father); Jane Hookham (mother)
- Relatives: John Hookham Frere (brother); John Fenn (uncle)

William Frere (28 November 1775 – 25 May 1836), was an English lawyer and academic, a law-serjeant and Master of Downing College, Cambridge.

== Life ==
Frere was the fourth son of John Frere of Roydon, South Norfolk, and younger brother of John Hookham Frere. He was born 28 November 1775, but spent much of his childhood at the house of his uncle John Fenn and aunt Ellenor Fenn whom he later described as 'looking up to my uncle and aunt as parents.' He was sent to Felsted School and Eton College, and in 1796 obtained a scholarship at Trinity College, Cambridge. In the same year he was elected to the Craven scholarship, and subsequently won several university honours, among them the senior chancellor's medal. He graduated fifth senior optime in 1798. In 1800 he became fellow of the newly founded Downing College.

He was called to the bar, and joined the Norfolk circuit in 1802. He was serjeant-at-law in 1809, and three years later was elected Master of Downing College, his appointment being unsuccessfully contested at law. In 1823 he edited the final fifth volume of Paston Letters begun by his uncle in 1787.

He was made recorder of Bury St. Edmunds in 1814, and in 1819 became vice-chancellor of Cambridge University. He lived for part of each year on an estate which he bought at Balsham, Cambridgeshire. He proceeded LL.D. at Cambridge 1825, and D.C.L. at Oxford 1834.

In 1826 he quit the bar.

== Works ==
He edited, with additions, Baron Glenbervie's Reports of Cases, 1813, and the fifth volume of the Paston Letters from the manuscript of Sir John Fenn (Original letters, written during the reigns of Henry VI., Edward IV., and Richard III. by various persons of rank or consequence; containing many curious anecdotes, relative to that period of our history, 5. vols. (1787–1823).

Some Latin and Greek verse by Frere was published with William Herbert's Fasciculus Carminum stylo Lucretiano scriptorum, 1797.

== Family ==
He married in 1810 Mary, daughter of Brampton Gurdon Dillingham. They had at least two children: Philip Howard Frere (1813–1868) and Augusta Frederica Frere (1824–1888). During Frere's time, chiefly through his wife, Downing College was a social centre at Cambridge.

== Death ==
He died 25 May 1836.

Academic offices
Preceded by Francis Annesley	Master of Downing College, Cambridge; 1812–1836	Succeeded by Thomas Worsley
