= Martha Walker Freer =

English writer

- Born: 1822; Leicestershire, United Kingdom
- Died: 28 June 1888 (aged 65–66)
- Occupation: Writer

Martha Walker Freer (1822–1888) was an English writer on French history. She was the daughter of John Booth Freer, M.D. and Martha, daughter of Sir William Walker of Leicestershire, and was born in Leicester. In 1861 she married the Rev. John Robinson, rector of Widmerpool, near Nottingham and became Martha Walker Robinson, but she continued to write under her maiden name. She died on 28 June 1888.

== Works ==
Her first book, Life of Marguerite d'Angoulême, Queen of Navarre, Duchesse d'Alençon, and De Berry, Sister of Francis I, appeared in 1854, in two volumes. She continued publishing books dealing with French history until 1866. Her works rivalled those of Julia Pardoe on similar subjects, and were popular. Two of them, Marguerite d'Angoulême and Jeanne d'Albret (1855), reached second editions.

Freer's other works were:

- Elizabeth de Valois, Queen of Spain and the Court of Philip II, 2 vols. 1857.
- Henry III, King of France and Poland: his Court and Times, 3 vols. 1858.
- History of the Reign of Henry IV, King of France and Navarre, part i. 2 vols. 1860; part ii. 2 vols. 1861; part iii. 2 vols. 1863.
- The Married Life of Anne of Austria and Don Sebastian, 2 vols. 1864.
- The Regency of Anne of Austria, 2 vols. 1866.
