= Philip Howard Frere =

English academic and agricultural writer

Philip Howard Frere (1813–1868) was an English academic and writer on agricultural matters.

== Life ==
He was the eldest son of William Frere and his wife Mary, daughter of Brampton Gurdon Dillingham. Educated at Eton College and Trinity College, Cambridge, in 1836 he gained a first class in the Classical Tripos. He took Anglican orders, but never held a benefice.

In 1837 Frere was elected a Fellow of Downing College, Cambridge and in 1839 became tutor and bursar there. Downing's endowments were mostly agricultural land, the management of which was the bursar's task. Frere knew farming from his father's estate at Balsham, Cambridgeshire, and he travelled in Europe.

Frere's combination of agricultural knowledge and foreign languages led to his appointment as editor of the Journal of the Royal Agricultural Society in 1862. He ran the Journal with success, himself contributing papers, till his death at Cambridge in May 1868.

== Family ==
Frere married in 1859 Emily, daughter of Henry Gipps, canon of Carlisle Cathedral, and vicar of Crosthwaite. There were five children of the marriage, three sons including Walter Howard Frere, and two daughters. The family were left orphans, when Emily Frere died two years after her husband.

== Notes ==
Attribution

This article incorporates text from a publication now in the public domain: Stephen, Leslie, ed. (1889). "Frere, Philip Howard". Dictionary of National Biography. Vol. 20. London: Smith, Elder & Co.
