= Martin Freer =

British physicist

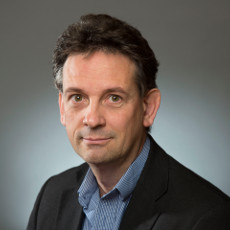
Martin Freer

Martin Freer is a British nuclear physicist and CEO of the Faraday Institution. He was previously head of the School of Physics and Astronomy at the University of Birmingham. He won the 2010 Rutherford Medal and Prize for establishing the existence of nuclear configurations analogous to molecules.

== Education ==
BSc (Hons) Maths and Physics, Aston University, 1987.

PhD in Nuclear Physics, University of Birmingham, 1991.

== University of Birmingham ==
From 2015 until 1 July 2019, Martin Freer was the head of the School of Physics and Astronomy at the University of Birmingham.

He is also the director of the Birmingham Centre for Nuclear Education and Research, whose purpose is to provide the investment and infrastructure to grow the nuclear expertise and capacity in Birmingham, as well as the Director of the Birmingham Energy Institute which seeks to develop sustainable energy solutions in transport, electricity and heat supply.

He featured in the Universities Birmingham Heroes campaign for "championing UK investment in clean-cold technologies amid concern that global demand for cooling and refrigeration will overtake heating by 2060."

== Works ==
- Hans O. U. Fynbo, Martin Freer, "Viewpoint: Rotations of the Hoyle State in Carbon-12", Physics 4, 94 (2011) | doi:10.1103/Physics.4.94
