= Justin Freer =

American composer and conductor

- Born: Huntington Beach, California
- Occupations: Composer, conductor
- Known for: CineConcerts

Justin Freer (born in Huntington Beach, California) is an American composer, conductor, and business owner. He is the founder and president of CineConcerts, a production company that pairs movies with live orchestration.

He has conducted at various famous concert halls, such as the Atlanta Symphony Hall and the Cleveland Orchestra.

Freer attended Edison High School. He has a bachelor's degree and master's degree in Music Composition from UCLA.

== CineConcerts ==
CineConcerts was founded in 2013 by Freer and producer/writer Brady Beaubien. Their first concert was for the movie Gladiator. Other concerts include The Harry Potter Film Concert Series, The Polar Express in Concert, The Godfather Live, It's a Wonderful Life in Concert, and more.

== See also ==
- Star Trek: The Ultimate Voyage
