= John William McNee =

British pathologist and bacteriologist

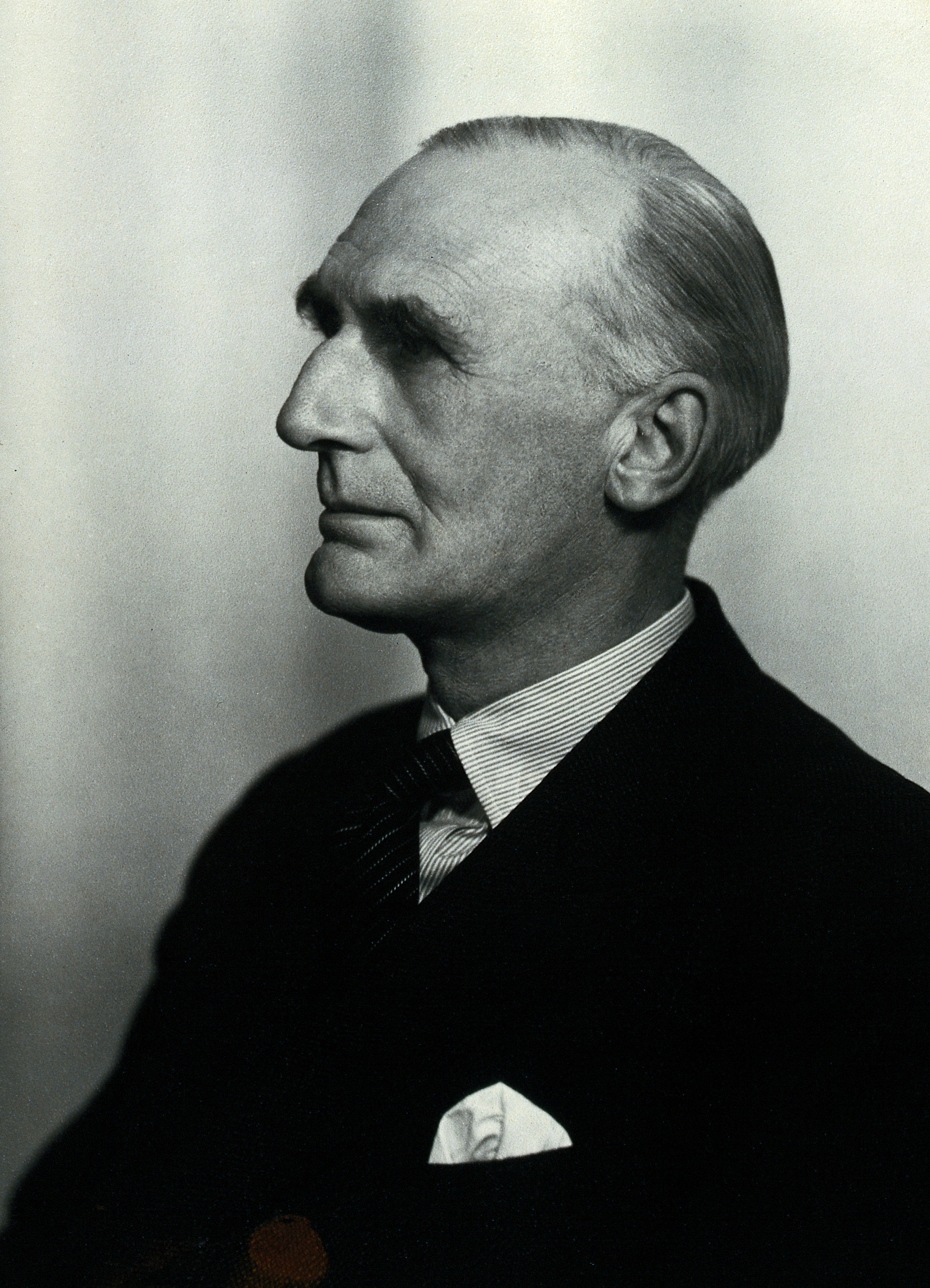
Sir John William McNee. Photograph by T. & R. Annan & Sons L Wellcome V0026789

Sir John William McNee FRSE DSO (17 December 1887–26 January 1984) was a 20th century British pathologist and bacteriologist.

== Life ==
He was born on 17 December 1887 in Mount Vernon in north Lanarkshire (now part of Glasgow), the only son of John McNee. The family moved to Newcastle-upon-Tyne in his childhood and he was educated there at the Royal Grammar School. He then returned to Scotland to study medicine at Glasgow University, graduating MB ChB in 1909.

He then began lecturing in Pathology at the university under Sir Robert Muir. In 1911 he was awarded a McCunn Scholarship and with a further Carnegie Research Fellowship in 1912 he travelled to Freiburg University in Germany to do postgraduate studies. Returning in 1914 he received his doctorate (MD) plus both the Bellahouston Gold Medal and John Hunter Gold Medal.

In World War I he served as a major in the Royal Army Medical Corps in France, being mentioned in dispatches. He did important work relating to both trench fever and gas gangrene, and on war nephritis and chlorine poisoning, receiving the Distinguished Service Order for his work. The research included probably the first autopsies of gas-poisoned soldiers on the battlefront. He was also awarded the Order of Aviz.

After the war he moved to University College Hospital in London, working under T. R. Elliot. In 1924 he obtained a Rockefeller Scholarship and went to Johns Hopkins University in Baltimore, USA, as an assistant professor studying coronary artery thrombosis, becoming an expert in this field. On his return to Britain he was offered the Chair in Practical Medicine at his alma mater of Glasgow University and accepted this.

In World War II he held the unique title of Surgeon Rear Admiral to the Royal Navy for Scotland and the Western Approaches. In 1939 he was elected a Fellow of the Royal Society of Edinburgh. His proposers were John Walton, Thomas Murray MacRobert, Edward Hindle and George Barger.

He served as president of the British Medical Association in 1954.

He died on 26 January 1984, aged 96.

== Family ==
In 1929, he married a medical researcher, Geraldine Le Bas (d. 1975). They had no children.

== Publications ==
- On Lipoid Degeneration of the Kidney (1922)
