= Walter Freer =

Scottish politician

Walter Freer (born c. 1846) was a Scottish Liberal Party worker. He was the son of a notable Chartist and has been described as a "staunch Gladstonian". He was also a power-loom tenter and temperance worker.
