= Elinor Freer =

American pianist from Montana

Elinor Freer is an American pianist from Montana, who has performed in the United States, Europe, and China.

== Education ==
She obtained degrees in music from the Cleveland Institute of Music and the University of Southern California and holds a Performer's Diploma from the Utrecht School of the Arts as well as a fellowship from the Steans Institute. She also was a participant of the Ravinia Festival and the Tanglewood Music Center.

== Tours and performances ==
During her European tour she gave performances at the Concertgebouw and also participated at the Rotterdam's Valery Gergiev Festival. She also recorded numerous original works for Dutch Radio, including her performance at the International Musicians' Seminar held at Prussia Cove and her performance at the Gnessin State Musical College in Moscow. During her Chinese tour she represented her country's pianists amid cultural exchanges.

She also served as a soloist for the String Orchestra of the Rockies, the Brevard Music Center, the Chamber Orchestra of the University of Rochester, and many others. She performs at various festivals including Summer Music in Harrisburg, Pennsylvania, Mexican Festival de Música de Cámera, Lake Winnipesaukee Music Festival and Bowdoin Music Festival.

== Awards ==
She is a winner of the Joanna Hodges International Competition and later on, became faculty member of both the Fort Hays and the University of Missouri. In 2003 she became Co-Artistic Director of the Skaneateles Festival. Freer has performed in many city schools and hospitals, for which she has been awarded numerous grants from the National Endowment for the Arts.
