= John Freer =

English cricketer

John Lane Freer (born 1803 at Hereford; died 1834 in England) was an English cricketer with amateur status. He was associated with Cambridge University and made his debut in 1827.

Freer was educated at Westminster School and Trinity College, Cambridge. He became a Church of England priest and was vicar of Wasperton 1829–32 and of Perry Barr from 1832 until his death.

== Bibliography ==
- Haygarth, Arthur (1862). Scores & Biographies, Volume 2 (1827–1840). Lillywhite.
