= Scott Freer =

English rugby union player

- Born: 7 May 1988 (age 38) Moortown, West Yorkshire, England
- Height: 5 ft 8 in (1.78 m)
- Weight: 15 st 10 lb (100 kg)

Rugby union career
- Position: Hooker/Prop
Senior career
| Years | Team | Apps | (Points) |
| 2006– | Leeds Carnegie | | |

Scott Freer (born 7 May 1988 in Moortown, England) is a rugby union player for Leeds Carnegie in the Aviva Championship. Freer can play at both Tighthead prop and at Hooker.
