= Winston Freer =

- Born: August 10, 1910; St. Albans, Vermont, United States
- Died: April 21, 1981 (aged 70)
- Occupation: Magician

Winston Freer (August 10, 1910 – April 21, 1981) was born in St. Albans, Vermont. In 1926, at the age of 16, Freer saw Howard Thurston perform and became interested in magic. He grew up to be one of magic's cleverest inventors.

In the 1930s, Freer worked at Abbott's Magic in Colon, Michigan and performed under the name Alladin and later Doc Maxam.

Freer gained a reputation for performing effects like freezing ice in his bare hand. He also startled magicians by performing a suspension while standing in the middle of a floor entirely surrounded. It was captured on the cover of The Linking Ring, August 1941.

Freer also published his classification of magical effects in The Linking Ring.

Freer also fancied himself a mathematician. A notable creation was his Tile Puzzle, where neither the pieces nor the frame change shape or size in any way.

== Published works ==
- Alagen Rope (with U.F. Grant) (1939)
- 25 Rice Bowl Methods (1954)
- The Magic of Doc Maxam (1954)

== Works about ==
- Adventures of Winston Freer CD (2008)

== See also ==
- List of magicians
- Card magic
- Coin magic
- magic (illusion)
