= Ania Freer =

Australian-Jamaican documentary filmmaker

- Born: 1986 (age 39–40); Sydney, Australia
- Education: University of Sydney
- Notable work: Strictly Two Wheel
- Parents: Vas Blackwood (father); Claire Freer (mother)
- Awards: Best Documentary Short Film Award, Trinidad and Tobago Film Festival
- Website: goatcurrygallery.org

Ania Freer is an Australian-Jamaican documentary filmmaker. She has documented oral histories of the people of Jamaica as a curator and through her filmmaking. Her film Strictly Two Wheel won the Best Documentary Short Film Award at the Trinidad and Tobago Film Festival in 2022. Born in Sydney, Australia, Freer graduated from the University of Sydney. She has exhibited at the National Gallery of Jamaica.

== Early life and education ==
Ania Freer was born in Sydney, Australia. Her grandmother has roots in the rural town of Gayle in Saint Mary Parish while her grandfather is from Christiana. Ania grew up in Australia and London, where her grandparents lived.

She earned a Bachelor of Arts degree from the University of Sydney in 2009, where she studied anthropology and film studies.

== Art career ==
While in Australia, Freer worked for Screen Australia and No Coincidence Media and was involved in the production of documentary films. After moving to Jamaica in 2016, she started a mini-documentary series called REAL TALK. Freer's works have documented oral histories of people in Jamaica. One of her films from 2018 captures two girls, about six years old, describing a freshwater mermaid who lives near Roaring River in Westmoreland.

Freer was the inaugural Curatorial and Art Writing Fellow at New Local Space in Kingston in 2019. She curated the group exhibition All That Don't Leave, which featured oral histories and craftworks of seven Jamaican artists. At the 2019 summer exhibition of the National Gallery of Jamaica, Freer presented a three-channel video installation. One of the films was Riva Maid, an interview with Dwight "Bobo" Hayes about a water spirit that abducted a woman in Roaring River. Riva Maid was included in the 2022 group exhibition Sound, Stories at the Miami gallery Locust Projects.

Freer created the 10-minute documentary short Strictly Two Wheel, which featured Jonathan "Bobo" Wilson, an elderly Jamaican bicycle repairman. She directed, filmed, edited, and produced the film. The film was shown at the Trinidad and Tobago Film Festival where it won the Best Documentary Short Film Award in 2022.

Freer participated in the exhibition Passages at the Nest in 2022. She filmed Kaa-Ha-Yut-Le, a video portrait of the Everglades featuring Seminole artist Daniel Tommie. Freer is the operator and curator of the online gallery and digital platform Goat Curry Gallery. She began conducting research and interviews in Senegalese fishing communities in 2022.

== Selected exhibitions ==
- 2017 – CHROM/ART International, London
- 2019 – National Gallery of Jamaica Summer Exhibition
- 2022 – Sound, Stories, Locust Projects, Miami
- 2023 – Passages at the Nest, AIRIE Nest Art Gallery
