= Fred Freer =

Australian cricketer

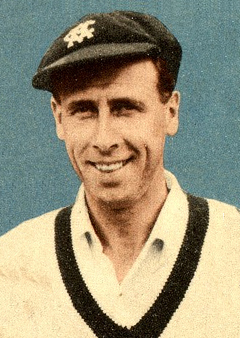
- Freer in about 1948

Personal information
- Born: 4 December 1915; North Carlton, Victoria, Australia
- Died: 2 November 1998 (aged 82); Melbourne, Victoria, Australia
- Batting: Right-handed
- Bowling: Right-arm fast-medium

International information
- National side: Australia
- Only Test (cap 173): 13 December 1946 v England

Career statistics
Competition	Test	First-class
Matches	1	40
Runs scored	28	1,284
Batting average	–	32.10
100s/50s	0/0	3/5
Top score	28*	132
Balls bowled	160	7,527
Wickets	3	104
Bowling average	24.66	27.75
5 wickets in innings	0	4
10 wickets in match	0	0
Best bowling	2/49	7/29
Catches/stumpings	0/–	25/–
- Source: Cricinfo, 31 May 2022

Frederick Alfred William Freer (4 December 1915 – 2 November 1998) was an Australian cricketer who played in one Test match in 1946.

Freer was a fast-medium bowler more accurate than Keith Miller. While playing for Victoria, Freer was called into the Australian team for the Second Test in Sydney against England in 1946 after Australia's then leading fast bowler Ray Lindwall was struck down by chickenpox.

In the first innings Freer bowled Cyril Washbrook for one and appealed for lbw against Len Hutton in the first ball of the second innings. It was turned down, but Freer had the wickets of Denis Compton (caught by Don Bradman) and Jack Ikin. When batting Australia wanted runs and Freer hit 3 fours and a 6 in his 28 not out, the only time he batted for Australia. Lindwall recovered in time for the next match, and Freer was dropped.

In March 1947 he declined an offer of £900 per annum from Rawtenstall CC to play as their professional owing to the club's inability to provide a house for him, his wife and two children.

Freer also played Australian rules football for Victorian Football Association side Yarraville.
