= Barbara Freer =

American poker player

World Series of Poker
- Bracelet: 1
- Money finishes: 6
- Highest WSOP Main Event finish: 18th, 1978

Barbara Freer was a World Series of Poker champion in the 1979 $400 Ladies - Limit 7 Card Stud event. She was the first woman to have played in an open WSOP event in 1979.

As of 2008, her total WSOP tournament winnings exceed $39,775.

== World Series of Poker bracelets ==
Year	Tournament	Prize (US$)
1979	$400 Ladies - Limit 7 Card Stud	$12,720
