= Henry Frere =

English cricketer

Personal information
- Full name: Henry Tobias Frere
- Born: 27 September 1830; Odiham, Hampshire, England
- Died: 15 August 1881 (aged 50); Westbourne, Sussex, England
- Batting: Right-handed
- Bowling: Right-arm roundarm fast
- Role: Occasional wicket-keeper

Domestic team information
- Years: Team
- 1850: Hampshire (pre-county club)
- 1863–1866: Hampshire
- 1868: Sussex

Career statistics
Competition	First-class
Matches	13
Runs scored	177
Batting average	9.83
100s/50s	–/–
Top score	26
Balls bowled	1,864
Wickets	24
Bowling average	26.95
5 wickets in innings	1
10 wickets in match	–
Best bowling	5/20
Catches/stumpings	5/2
- Source: Cricinfo, 12 February 2010

Henry Tobias Frere (27 September 1830 – 15 August 1881) was an English first-class cricketer.

The son of Tobias Frere, he was born at Odiham in September 1830. Frere made his debut in first-class cricket for Hampshire against an All England Eleven at Southampton in 1850. Five years passed before his next appearance in first-class cricket, which came for the Gentlemen of England against the Marylebone Cricket Club. He featured regularly for Gentlemen sides in the late 1850s, including playing in the Gentlemen v Players fixture. In 1864, he played for the nascent Hampshire County Cricket Club in their inaugural first-class match, played against Sussex at Southampton; he would play for Hampshire until 1866, making five further appearances. In 1868, Frere played one first-class match for Sussex against Middlesex at Hove. Later in October 1868, he played a minor match for Surrey against the touring Australian Aboriginal cricket team. He also played minor matches for Wiltshire. Considered a 'crack shot', in thirteen appearances in first-class cricket he scored 177 runs at an average of 9.83, with a highest score of 26. With the ball, he took 24 wickets with his roundarm fast bowling at a bowling average of 26.95; he took one five wicket haul of 5 for 20. As an occasional wicket-keeper, he made two stumpings. Frere died in August 1881 at Westbourne, Sussex.
