= Robert Freer (physician) =

Scottish physician, soldier and academic

Robert Freer (or Frier) FRSE FRCPE (1745 – 8 April 1827) was a soldier and academic, who taught medicine at the University of Glasgow. He was Regius Professor of Medicine from 1796 until his death (31 years). He was twice President of the Medical Society of Edinburgh (1772-4 and 1775–8). He was President of the Royal College of Physicians and Surgeons of Glasgow in 1797.

== Life ==
He was born in Perthshire. He studied medicine at the University of Aberdeen, graduating with an MA in 1765. He then undertook further studies at the University of Edinburgh and Leyden University in the Netherlands. In 1776 he was recorded as a member of the Glasgow Literary Society. In the same year he gave an eloquent speech to the Medical Society of Edinburgh while acting as their Senior President.

In early life he served as an Ensign and military surgeon both in Europe and in the American War of Independence, including at the Battle of Bunker Hill. In 1779 he settled in Glasgow as a physician, in which year King's College, Aberdeen awarded him his doctorate. In 1783 he became a Licentiate of the Royal College of Physicians, and in 1786 was elected a Fellow of the Royal College of Physicians of Edinburgh. In 1794 he was elected a member of the Harveian Society of Edinburgh. From 1796 he was Professor of Medicine at the University of Glasgow and jointly acting as head Physician at Glasgow Royal Infirmary. In the same year he was elected a Fellow of the Royal Society of Edinburgh, his proposers being Daniel Rutherford, James Finlayson and Thomas Charles Hope. He had previously, in 1793, been unsuccessfully proposed by Daniel Rutherford, James Hutton and John Walker.

While teaching he lived at the College Court within the university.

In 1816 he is listed as a Director of the Glasgow Lunatic Asylum.

He died in Glasgow on 9 April 1827.
