= Fryer (surname) =

Fryer is a surname. Notable people with the surname include:

- Bernie Fryer, American basketball player and official
- Brian Fryer, Canadian gridiron football player
- Eric Fryer (actor), Canadian actor
- Eric Fryer (baseball) (born 1985), American baseball catcher
- Frederick William Richards Fryer, British administrator in Burma
- John Fryer (1671–1726), pewterer and Lord Mayor of London
- J. R. Tranthim-Fryer, born John Robertson Fryer (1858–1928), Australian sculptor
- John Fryer (producer), English record producer and musician
- John Fryer (sailor) (1753–1817), officer on the Bounty
- John E. Fryer (1937–2003), American psychiatrist and gay rights activist
- Katherine Fryer (1910–2017), English artist
- Miranda Fryer, actress
- Nelson Fryer (1818–1896), American farmer and politician
- Nick Fryer, British disc jockey and record producer
- Peter Fryer, English writer and journalist
- Richard Fryer (cinematographer) (1894–1953), born Morris Kolsky, British-born Hollywood cinematographer
- Richard Fryer (politician) (1770–1846), banker, landowner and British Whig politician
- Roland G. Fryer Jr, American economist and Harvard professor
- William Fryer (1895–1960), English-American footballer

== See also ==
- Freyr
- Fryar
- Fryars, British musician
- Friar, Christian religion
