= Galileo (Star Trek) =

Fictional short-range spacecraft

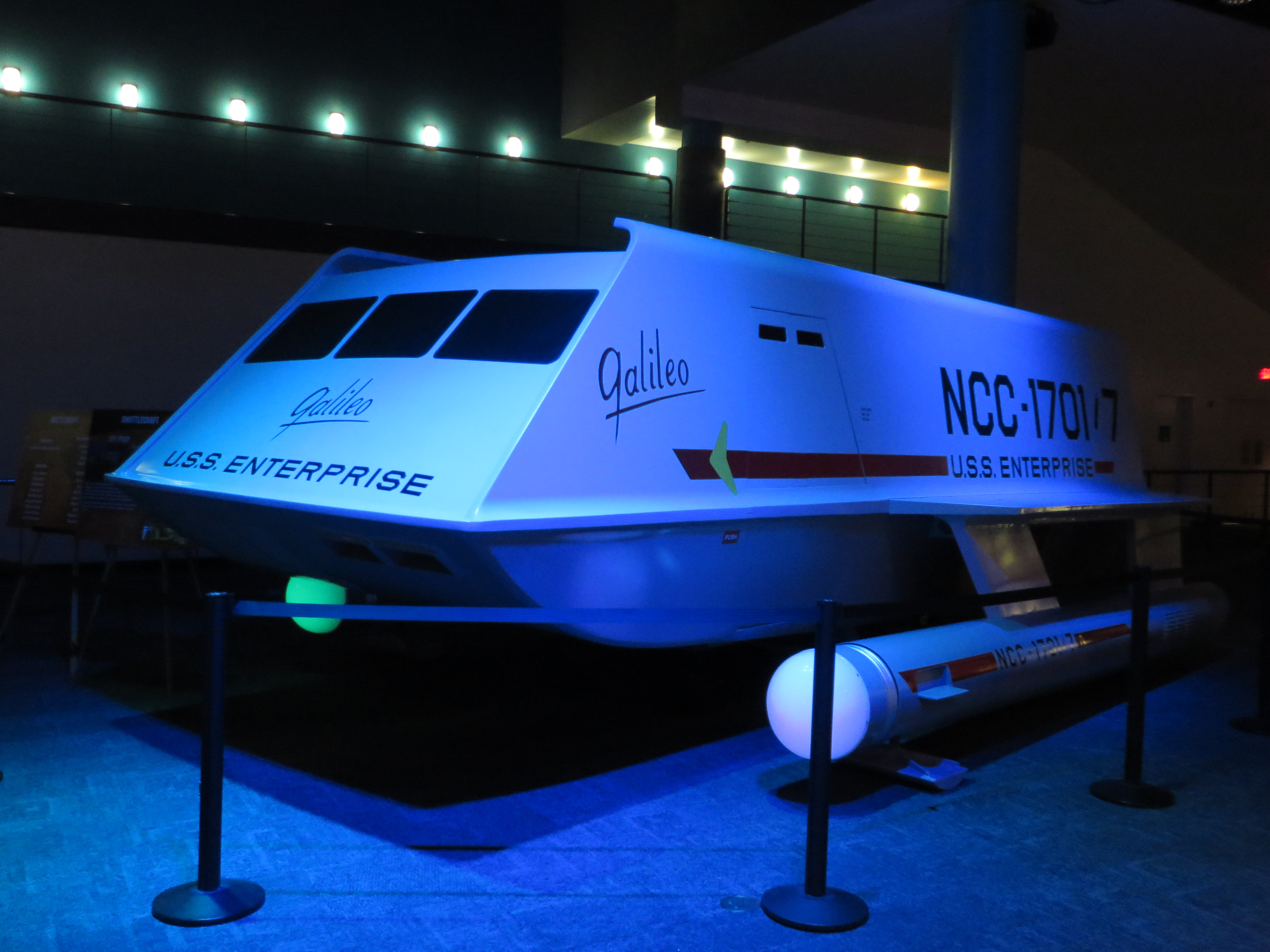
- The full-size exterior prop, restored and on display at Space Center Houston
- First appearance: "The Galileo Seven"

Information
- Affiliation: Starfleet

General characteristics
- Class: Class-F shuttlecraft
- Registry: NCC-1701/7
- Length: 22 feet (6.7 m)
- Height: 8 feet (2.4 m)

Galileo is a fictional spacecraft that appeared in the 1960s American science-fiction television series Star Trek. It was a shuttlecraft assigned to the USS Enterprise, and was the first of its type to be seen on screen in the franchise, appearing in the episode "The Galileo Seven". It appeared an additional four times in the series before being replaced by the Galileo II, a repaint of the full-size exterior model.

Requests for building the props required to allow a shuttle to appear in episodes were initially turned down by Desilu Productions due to the cost. When Aluminum Model Toys became interested in building model kits of the Enterprise, a deal was struck in which they built the props in exchange for the licence. In addition to a miniature, two full-size props were built. After the end of the series, the full-scale exterior model was donated to a school for the blind. It then passed through a series of owners before being sold at auction in 2012. It was then restored and donated to the Johnson Space Center.

== Concept and design ==
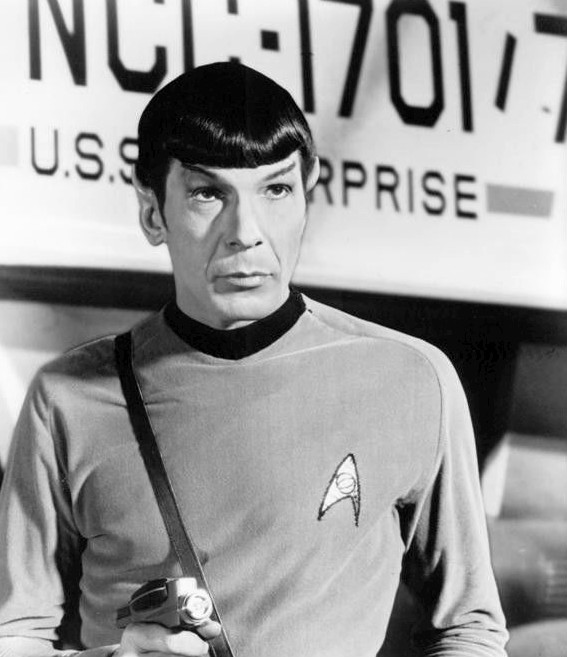
Leonard Nimoy as Spock, standing in front of the Galileo

A shuttle had been suggested initially during the production of "The Enemy Within", but was ultimately rejected due to the cost. It was raised again in Oliver Crawford's pitch for "The Galileo Seven". Series creator Gene Roddenberry attempted to persuade executives at Desilu Productions that the prop was needed for both this episode and his plan for "The Menagerie", but they rejected this again because of the budget. This delayed production on "The Galileo Seven" for more than two months.

In July 1966, previews began to air for Star Trek, which were seen by executives at Aluminum Model Toys (AMT). They sought the contract to produce model kits based on the starships seen in the series. A contract was signed between AMT and Desilu on August 1 of that year, stipulating that kits based on the Enterprise could be made in exchange for AMT providing a full-scale exterior of a shuttle and an interior set. The prop measures 22 feet (6.7 m) long, and 8 feet (2.4 m) tall.

The Shuttle was built by Gene Winfield, a speciality car designer, from blueprints created by Thomas Kellogg, who worked on the Studebaker Avanti.

Two versions were built. The first was intended for exterior filming, while the second version was a set of the interior, with removable "wild" walls to allow a variety of camera angles. These were constructed during August 1966 in Phoenix, Arizona, at a cost of $24,000, which was around double the original estimate, although it was still fully funded by AMT. AMT also built the filming miniature which was sent by the studio to original Enterprise builder Richard Datin when he was building the corresponding shuttlebay for the sum of $2,100, which was charged to the episode budget. The familiar decals were applied by Datin; prior to that the shuttle was marked with a simple "173 " number. For the Galileo II, the exterior full-size model was repainted to represent the new shuttle.

After the end of the series, Paramount donated the Galileo prop to a school for the blind. It subsequently passed through the hands of several owners, before being stored in Ohio for some twenty years and falling into disrepair. It was auctioned on June 28, 2012, with the price holding at around $20,000 until the final 90 seconds, when three bidders jumped in. The prop sold for $70,150 to Adam Schneider. Schneider released a statement on TrekBBS, commenting that he was "very, very happy to have the opportunity to acquire and renovate Galileo" and planned to "restore her and put her on display for the fans."

=== Later Galileos ===
The Galileo II was created for the episode "The Way to Eden" to replace the original Galileo, which had been destroyed in "The Galileo Seven". This was despite the Galileo appearing in further episodes following the apparent destruction, which was attributed to an oversight by the producers. According to the non-canon in-universe reference work Star Trek: Ships of the Line, the Galileo II was the final remaining class F shuttle in service and was put on display at the National Air and Space Museum.

A new shuttle named Galileo 5 was created for Star Trek V: The Final Frontier. It was designed by Nilo Rodis and Andy Neskoromny, with the miniature constructed by Greg Jein. Two full-size props were also built, with one of them later being used in Star Trek: The Next Generation. The miniature was sold in 2014 by the Profiles in History auction house in Calabasas, California. Another shuttlecraft called Galileo appeared in the Star Trek: The Next Generation finale, "All Good Things...", in the timeline set prior to the start of the pilot. This was intended to be a reference to the Galileo seen in the original series.

=== Restoration ===
Schneider said that "The Galileo is important because it's really the biggest surviving movie or TV set of the modern era. Describing the fictional spacecraft as "the precursor to the space shuttle Enterprise", he added that "it was important to preserve it because it is a piece of not just TV history, but our space program's history."

Schneider discussed the restoration effort with fans of the series online and managed to contact Winfield, who suggested that a boat restorer might be the most appropriate craftsman to restore Galileo. The restoration efforts were conducted by Master Shipwrights in Atlantic Highlands, New Jersey, with more than 2,000 man hours put into the reconstruction. The funding for this came from Schneider, as he was concerned that use a crowdfunding model would slow down work. The intention was not only to restore the exterior of the prop, but to improve it structurally in order to ensure that it would not be damaged by being moved around. However, the rebuild was not without incident. Four days after the prop arrived in New Jersey, Hurricane Sandy hit the area. The shop flooded, destroying both the electrics and all of the tools. The restored Galileo was unveiled at Master Shipwrights on June 22, 2013.

Following the unveiling, Schneider contacted more than twelve air and space museums to find a good fit for Galileo, as he wanted it to be on display. He eventually settled with NASA's Space Center Houston, part of the Johnson Space Center, where it was unveiled on July 31, 2013. Attendees at the event included Don Marshall, who portrayed Lt. Boma in "The Galileo Seven", along with Robert Picardo from Star Trek: Voyager, Tracy Scoggins from Babylon 5 and Gil Gerard of Buck Rogers in the 25th Century. It went on permanent display within the Zero-G Diner at the center as part of an exhibition to show how science fiction has influenced real-world space exploration. As of 2016, Galileo had been loaned to the Intrepid Museum in New York City, where it was placed on display alongside the Space Shuttle Enterprise.

On November 4, 2022, the Star Trek Original Series Set Tour – a fan-created museum attraction in Ticonderoga, New York, featuring costumes and props used in the show as well as full-size recreations of Enterprise interior sets – announced that they would be displaying the Galileo on a long-term basis.

== Appearances ==
The first appearance of the Galileo was in the season 1 episode "The Galileo Seven". In this episode, a team led by Spock (Leonard Nimoy) investigates an anomaly while the Enterprise heads on to the planet Makus III to lend medical aid. The shuttle is pulled off course and crashes on the planet Taurus II. The team attempts to find a way to return the damaged Galileo to orbit, while being attacked by the natives of the planet. The crew refuel the shuttle from the battery packs of their collective phasers, and once in orbit, Spock dumps and ignites the remaining fuel to produce a giant flare that allows the Enterprise to find them. The crew are transported to safety as the Galileo burns up in the atmosphere. During the course of the episode, a second shuttle, named Columbus, is seen. This is a re-use of the miniature model of the Galileo. All future appearances of the miniature in the series were re-uses of the footage from this episode.

Despite its destruction, the Galileo is seen a further four times during the second season. In "Metamorphosis", the Galileo is forced to land on an unknown planet. Unable to discern a cause of the shuttle's malfunction, Spock meets with Zephram Cochrane (Glenn Corbett), who explains that a dampening field on the planet is preventing the shuttle from working. When Spock continues in his attempts to repair the shuttle, Cochrane's non-corporeal "Companion" (voiced by Elizabeth Rogers) destroys his equipment and damages the vessel. Captain Kirk (William Shatner) tries to convince the Companion to let them leave, but it merges with a human and loses its powers – repairing the shuttle in the process.

In "The Doomsday Machine", the guilt-ridden Commodore Matt Decker (William Windom), who has lost the crew of his USS Constellation to the machine, steals the shuttle in a suicidal attempt to destroy the alien "planet killer". The identification insignia of the shuttle reads NCC-1701/6. The shuttle is destroyed along with Decker, but this sacrifice at least gives Kirk the clue he needs to destroy the machine by feeding the derelict Constellation into its maw. A burned and punctured AMT Enterprise plastic model was filmed as the Constellation.

In "Journey to Babel", the Galileo ferries the ambassadors to the Enterprise. The episode's script originally specified use of the transporter, but stock footage of the shuttle was used to reduce costs. In the final appearance of that version of the shuttle, it is taken on an apparent suicide mission by Spock into a giant space amoeba in "The Immunity Syndrome". After the Enterprise also enters the amoeba, Kirk risks the ship by ordering a tractor beam lock on the shuttle to save both it and its pilot. The Galileo II appears in the episode "The Way to Eden", after Dr. Sevrin (Skip Homeier) and his followers hijack the Enterprise and take it to the planet Eden in Romulan territory. They then steal the shuttle, which they use to reach the planet.

A downed Galileo "class F shuttlecraft" with NCC-1701/7 registration appears in Star Trek: Prodigy episode "All the World's a Stage", having last been flown by Ensign Garrovick.

== Models and toy lines ==
A variety of models and toys were created based on the design of the Galileo. These include several versions by the Franklin Mint, such as a pewter model of Galileo II in 1990 and two versions of Galileo dioramas, depicting the shuttle on a planet set within a mini-globe, in 1995. Hallmark produced a Christmas decoration of the Galileo in 1992; this was only the second release in the range, following the previous year's production of the Enterprise. The Galileo has also appeared within a set of shuttlecraft models for the Star Trek: Official Starships Collection in 2015. In 2020 the Round 2 model company released a new accurate kit of the Galileo in 1/32 scale under its Polar Lights brand.

Le creuset released a version of the shuttle in 2026 as a part of their Star Trek collection.
