= List of Star Trek television series =

Logo for the first Star Trek series, now known as The Original Series

Star Trek is an American science fiction media franchise that started with a television series (simply called Star Trek but now referred to as The Original Series) created by Gene Roddenberry. The series was first broadcast from 1966 to 1969 on NBC. Since then, the Star Trek canon has expanded to include many other series, a film franchise, and other media, including the YouTube series Scouts.

The first new series was The Animated Series, featuring the cast of The Original Series, which was broadcast from 1973 to 1974. In the 1980s, a new syndication series titled The Next Generation expanded the franchise with a new cast and setting. Two spin-off series, Deep Space Nine and Voyager (on the new network UPN), followed in the 1990s. Enterprise, a prequel to the original series, was broadcast on UPN beginning in 2001. The series was canceled in 2005.

After a break of over a decade, a new series was developed for the streaming service CBS All Access (later rebranded as Paramount+). Discovery debuted in 2017, and its success led to a new expansion of the franchise in the following years. This began with companion series Short Treks, followed in the 2020s by Picard, new animated series Lower Decks and Prodigy, Strange New Worlds, and Starfleet Academy, as well as a direct-to-streaming film. After Prodigy was canceled by Paramount+ during production of its second season, the series moved to Netflix.

== Series overview ==
Thirteen television series make up the Star Trek franchise: The Original Series, The Animated Series, The Next Generation, Deep Space Nine, Voyager, Enterprise, Discovery, Short Treks, Picard, Lower Decks, Prodigy, Strange New Worlds, and Starfleet Academy. All series in total amount to 970 episodes across 52 seasons of television. (Note: The episode count includes all completed and released episodes. The count also includes the Original Series's unaired pilot, "The Cage". Multi-part episodes not originally broadcast as one presentation are counted individually. Ten feature-length episodes are counted as two episodes each, as they were split for foreign broadcast and syndication.)

Series	Season	Episodes	Originally released			Executive producers	Status
Series	Season	Episodes	First released	Last released	Network	Executive producers	Status
Broadcast series
The Original Series	1	29	September 8, 1966	April 13, 1967	NBC	Gene Roddenberry	Concluded
The Original Series	2	26	September 15, 1967	March 29, 1968	NBC	Gene Roddenberry	Concluded
The Original Series	3	24	September 20, 1968	June 3, 1969	NBC	Fred Freiberger	Concluded
The Animated Series	1	16	September 8, 1973	January 12, 1974	NBC	Gene Roddenberry and D. C. Fontana	Concluded
The Animated Series	2	6	September 7, 1974	October 12, 1974	NBC	Gene Roddenberry and D. C. Fontana	Concluded
The Next Generation	1	26	September 28, 1987	May 16, 1988	Syndication	Gene Roddenberry	Concluded
The Next Generation	2	22	November 21, 1988	July 17, 1989	Syndication	Gene Roddenberry and Maurice Hurley	Concluded
The Next Generation	3	26	September 25, 1989	June 18, 1990	Syndication	Gene Roddenberry, Rick Berman and Michael Piller	Concluded
The Next Generation	4	26	September 24, 1990	June 17, 1991	Syndication	Gene Roddenberry, Rick Berman and Michael Piller	Concluded
The Next Generation	5	26	September 23, 1991	June 15, 1992	Syndication	Rick Berman and Michael Piller	Concluded
The Next Generation	6	26	September 21, 1992	June 21, 1993	Syndication	Rick Berman and Michael Piller	Concluded
The Next Generation	7	26	September 20, 1993	May 23, 1994	Syndication	Rick Berman, Michael Piller and Jeri Taylor	Concluded
Deep Space Nine	1	20	January 3, 1993	June 21, 1993	Syndication	Michael Piller	Concluded
Deep Space Nine	2	26	September 27, 1993	June 13, 1994	Syndication	Michael Piller	Concluded
Deep Space Nine	3	26	September 26, 1994	June 19, 1995	Syndication	Michael Piller	Concluded
Deep Space Nine	4	26	October 2, 1995	June 17, 1996	Syndication	Ira Steven Behr	Concluded
Deep Space Nine	5	26	September 30, 1996	June 16, 1997	Syndication	Ira Steven Behr	Concluded
Deep Space Nine	6	26	September 29, 1997	June 15, 1998	Syndication	Ira Steven Behr	Concluded
Deep Space Nine	7	26	September 28, 1998	May 31, 1999	Syndication	Ira Steven Behr	Concluded
Voyager	1	16	January 16, 1995	May 22, 1995	UPN	Rick Berman, Michael Piller, and Jeri Taylor	Concluded
Voyager	2	26	August 28, 1995	May 20, 1996	UPN	Rick Berman, Michael Piller, and Jeri Taylor	Concluded
Voyager	3	26	September 4, 1996	May 21, 1997	UPN	Rick Berman and Jeri Taylor	Concluded
Voyager	4	26	September 3, 1997	May 20, 1998	UPN	Rick Berman and Jeri Taylor	Concluded
Voyager	5	26	October 14, 1998	May 26, 1999	UPN	Brannon Braga	Concluded
Voyager	6	26	September 22, 1999	May 24, 2000	UPN	Brannon Braga	Concluded
Voyager	7	26	October 4, 2000	May 23, 2001	UPN	Kenneth Biller	Concluded
Enterprise	1	26	September 26, 2001	May 22, 2002	UPN	Brannon Braga and Rick Berman	Concluded
Enterprise	2	26	September 18, 2002	May 21, 2003	UPN	Brannon Braga and Rick Berman	Concluded
Enterprise	3	24	September 10, 2003	May 26, 2004	UPN	Brannon Braga and Rick Berman	Concluded
Enterprise	4	22	October 8, 2004	May 13, 2005	UPN	Brannon Braga, Rick Berman and Manny Coto	Concluded
Streaming series
Discovery	1	15	September 24, 2017 (Note: The first episode had a special premiere on CBS alongside its release on CBS All Access.)	February 11, 2018	CBS All Access / Paramount+ (Note: CBS All Access was rebranded as Paramount+ on March 4, 2021; seasons released before this date were initially released on CBS All Access and seasons released after were released on Paramount+.)	Gretchen J. Berg and Aaron Harberts	Concluded
Discovery	2	14	January 17, 2019	April 18, 2019	CBS All Access / Paramount+	Alex Kurtzman	Concluded
Discovery	3	13	October 15, 2020	January 7, 2021	CBS All Access / Paramount+	Alex Kurtzman and Michelle Paradise	Concluded
Discovery	4	13	November 18, 2021	March 17, 2022	CBS All Access / Paramount+	Alex Kurtzman and Michelle Paradise	Concluded
Discovery	5	10	April 4, 2024	May 30, 2024	CBS All Access / Paramount+	Alex Kurtzman and Michelle Paradise	Concluded
Short Treks	1	4	October 4, 2018	January 3, 2019	CBS All Access / Paramount+	Alex Kurtzman	Concluded
Short Treks	2	6	October 5, 2019	January 9, 2020	CBS All Access / Paramount+	Alex Kurtzman	Concluded
Picard	1	10	January 23, 2020	March 26, 2020	CBS All Access / Paramount+	Michael Chabon	Concluded
Picard	2	10	March 3, 2022	May 5, 2022	CBS All Access / Paramount+	Akiva Goldsman and Terry Matalas	Concluded
Picard	3	10	February 16, 2023	April 20, 2023	CBS All Access / Paramount+	Terry Matalas	Concluded
Lower Decks	1	10	August 6, 2020	October 8, 2020	CBS All Access / Paramount+	Mike McMahan	Concluded
Lower Decks	2	10	August 12, 2021	October 14, 2021	CBS All Access / Paramount+	Mike McMahan	Concluded
Lower Decks	3	10	August 25, 2022	October 27, 2022	CBS All Access / Paramount+	Mike McMahan	Concluded
Lower Decks	4	10	September 7, 2023	November 2, 2023	CBS All Access / Paramount+	Mike McMahan	Concluded
Lower Decks	5	10	October 24, 2024	December 19, 2024	CBS All Access / Paramount+	Mike McMahan	Concluded
Prodigy	1	20	October 28, 2021	December 29, 2022	CBS All Access / Paramount+	Kevin and Dan Hageman	Concluded
Prodigy	2	20	July 1, 2024		Netflix	Kevin and Dan Hageman	Concluded
Strange New Worlds	1	10	May 5, 2022	July 7, 2022	Paramount+	Akiva Goldsman and Henry Alonso Myers	Released
Strange New Worlds	2	10	June 15, 2023	August 10, 2023	Paramount+	Akiva Goldsman and Henry Alonso Myers	Released
Strange New Worlds	3	10	July 17, 2025	September 11, 2025	Paramount+	Akiva Goldsman and Henry Alonso Myers	Released
Strange New Worlds	4	10	July 23, 2026	September 24, 2026	Paramount+	Akiva Goldsman and Henry Alonso Myers	Released
Strange New Worlds	5	6	TBA	TBA	Paramount+	Akiva Goldsman and Henry Alonso Myers	Post-production
Starfleet Academy	1	10	January 15, 2026	March 12, 2026	Paramount+	Alex Kurtzman and Noga Landau	Released
Starfleet Academy	2	10	March 2027	TBA	Paramount+	Alex Kurtzman and Noga Landau	Post-production

== Broadcast series ==
Six television series make up the Star Trek broadcast franchise: The Original Series, The Animated Series, The Next Generation, Deep Space Nine, Voyager, and Enterprise. All series in total amount to 725 episodes across 30 seasons of television.

=== The Original Series (1966–1969) ===
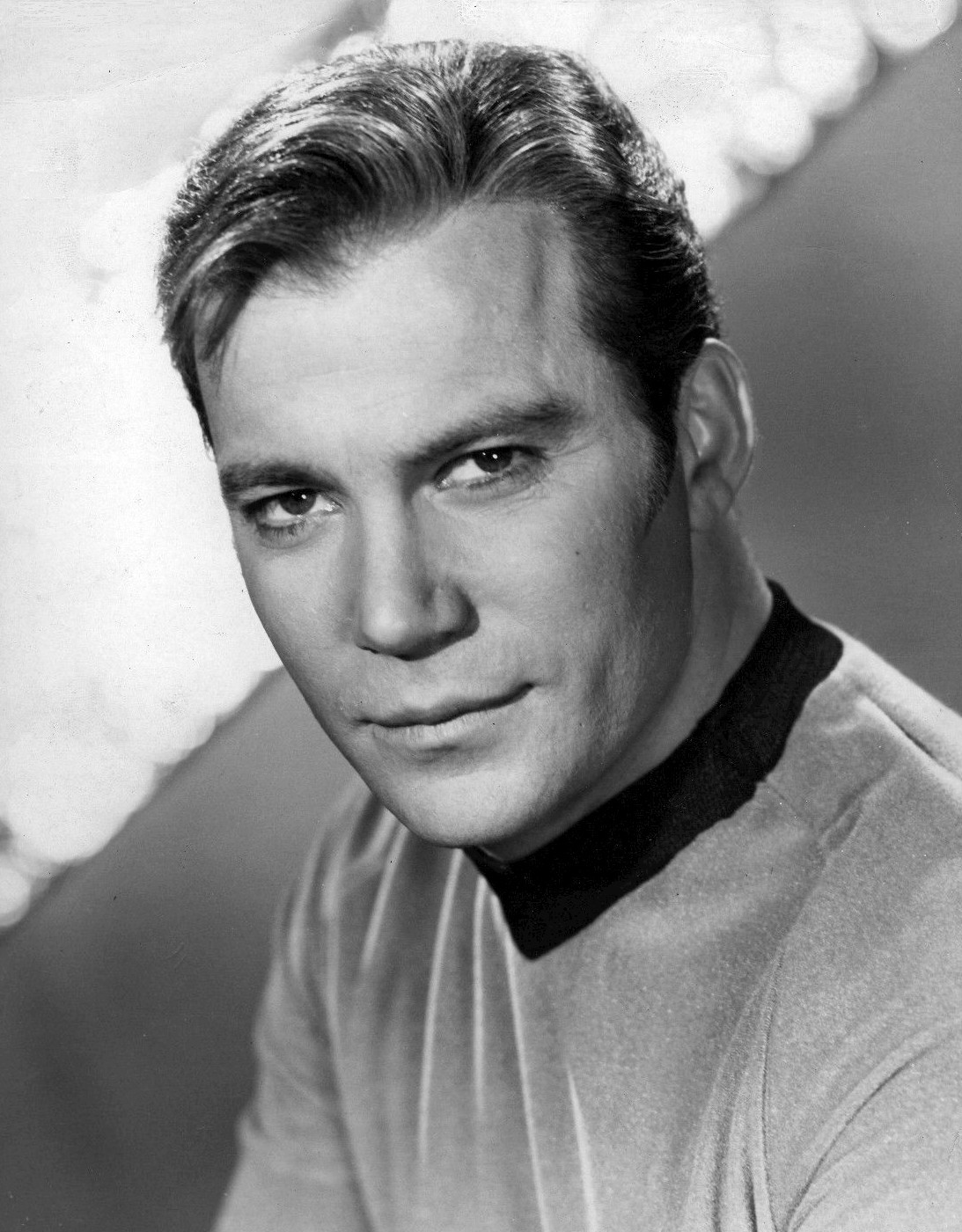
William Shatner played James T. Kirk in The Original Series, The Animated Series, and seven films

Star Trek, also known as Star Trek: The Original Series, often abbreviated as TOS, (Note: Originally titled Star Trek. Marketed as Star Trek: The Original Series to distinguish it from its sequels and the franchise as a whole.) debuted in the United States on NBC on September 8, 1966. The series tells the tale of the crew of the starship Enterprise and its five-year mission "to boldly go where no man has gone before." The original 1966–69 television series featured William Shatner as Captain James T. Kirk, Leonard Nimoy as Spock, DeForest Kelley as Dr. Leonard "Bones" McCoy, James Doohan as Montgomery "Scotty" Scott, Nichelle Nichols as Uhura, George Takei as Hikaru Sulu, and Walter Koenig as Pavel Chekov. During the series' original run, it earned several nominations for the Hugo Award for Best Dramatic Presentation and won twice: for the two-part episode "The Menagerie", and the Harlan Ellison-written episode "The City on the Edge of Forever".

Cast included:

- William Shatner as James T. Kirk
- Leonard Nimoy as Spock
- DeForest Kelley as Leonard McCoy
- James Doohan as Scotty
- Nichelle Nichols as Uhura
- George Takei as Hikaru Sulu
- Walter Koenig as Pavel Chekov
- Majel Barrett as Christine Chapel
- Grace Lee Whitney as Janice Rand

NBC canceled the series after three seasons; the last original episode aired on June 3, 1969. A petition near the end of the second season to save the series signed by many Caltech students and its multiple Hugo nominations would indicate that despite low Nielsen ratings, it was highly popular with science fiction fans and engineering students. The series later became popular in reruns and found a cult following. In the 2000s, the series was remastered for television, which included special-effect changes including CGI versions of the ships.

=== The Animated Series (1973–1974) ===
Star Trek, later marketed as Star Trek: The Animated Series (TAS) to differentiate it from the live-action series, was produced by Filmation, and ran for two seasons from 1973 to 1974. Most of the original cast performed the voices of their characters from The Original Series, and some of the writers who worked on The Original Series returned, including D. C. Fontana, David Gerrold and Paul Schneider. While the animated format allowed the producers to create more exotic alien landscapes and life forms, animation errors and liberal reuse of shots and musical cues have tarnished the series' reputation. Although it was originally sanctioned by Paramount, which owned the Star Trek franchise following its acquisition of Desilu in 1967, Gene Roddenberry often spoke of TAS as non-canon. As of March 2026, it has references in the “series and movies” section of the official Star Trek website.

The cast included:

- William Shatner as James T. Kirk
- Leonard Nimoy as Spock
- DeForest Kelley as Leonard McCoy
- James Doohan as Montgomery "Scotty" Scott
- Nichelle Nichols as Uhura
- George Takei as Hikaru Sulu
- Majel Barrett as Christine Chapel

The Animated Series won Star Trek's first Emmy Award on May 15, 1975. The Animated Series briefly returned to television in the mid-1980s on the children's cable network Nickelodeon. Nickelodeon parent Viacom would purchase Paramount in 1994; in the early 1990s, the Sci-Fi Channel also began rerunning TAS. The complete series was also released on Laserdisc format during the 1980s. The complete series was first released in the United States on eleven volumes of VHS tapes in 1989. All 22 episodes were released on DVD in 2006.

=== The Next Generation (1987–1994) ===
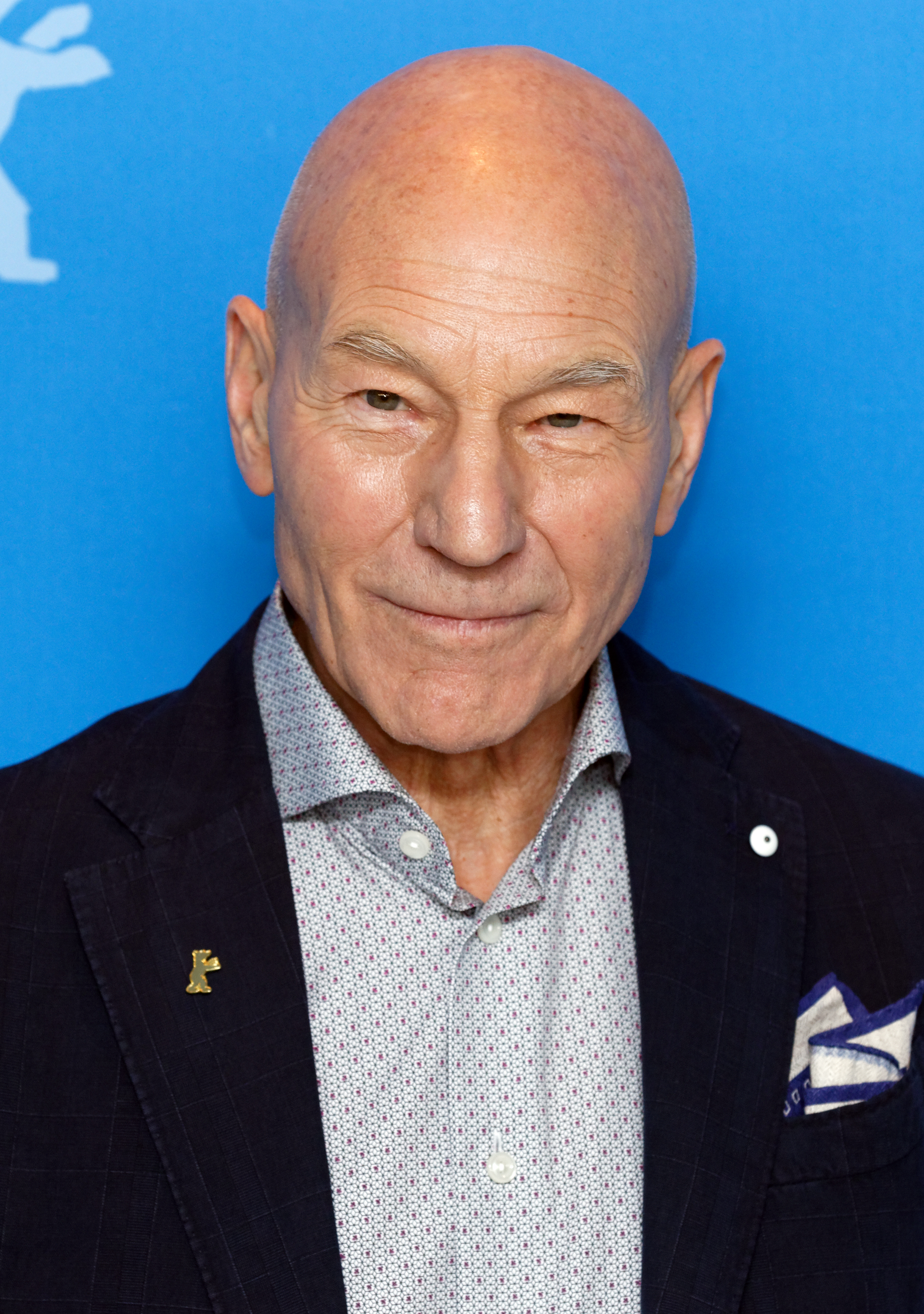
Patrick Stewart played Jean-Luc Picard in The Next Generation, subsequent films and later in the series Picard

Star Trek: The Next Generation, frequently abbreviated as TNG, takes place about a century after The Original Series (2364–2370). It features a new starship, Enterprise-D, and a new crew led by Captain Jean-Luc Picard (Patrick Stewart) and Commander William Riker (Jonathan Frakes). Some crew members represent new alien races, including Deanna Troi, a half-Betazoid counselor played by Marina Sirtis. Michael Dorn plays Worf, the first Klingon officer in Starfleet, alongside Gates McFadden as Dr. Beverly Crusher, LeVar Burton as chief engineer Geordi La Forge, the android Data portrayed by Brent Spiner, and Dr. Crusher's son Wesley Crusher played by Wil Wheaton.

- Patrick Stewart as Jean-Luc Picard
- Jonathan Frakes as William Riker
- LeVar Burton as Geordi La Forge
- Denise Crosby as Tasha Yar
- Michael Dorn as Worf
- Gates McFadden as Beverly Crusher
- Diana Muldaur as Katherine Pulaski
- Marina Sirtis as Deanna Troi
- Brent Spiner as Data
- Wil Wheaton as Wesley Crusher

The series premiered on September 28, 1987, and ran for seven seasons, ending on May 23, 1994. It had the highest ratings of any of the Star Trek series and became the #1 syndicated show during the last few years of its original run, allowing it to act as a springboard for ideas in other series. Many relationships and races introduced in TNG became the basis of episodes in Deep Space Nine and Voyager. During its run, it earned several Emmy Awards and nominations—including a nomination for Best Dramatic Series during its final season—two Hugo Awards and a Peabody Award for Outstanding Television Programming for the episode "The Big Goodbye". The series was released in high definition on Blu-Ray and Netflix with some special effect changes in the 2010s.

=== Deep Space Nine (1993–1999) ===
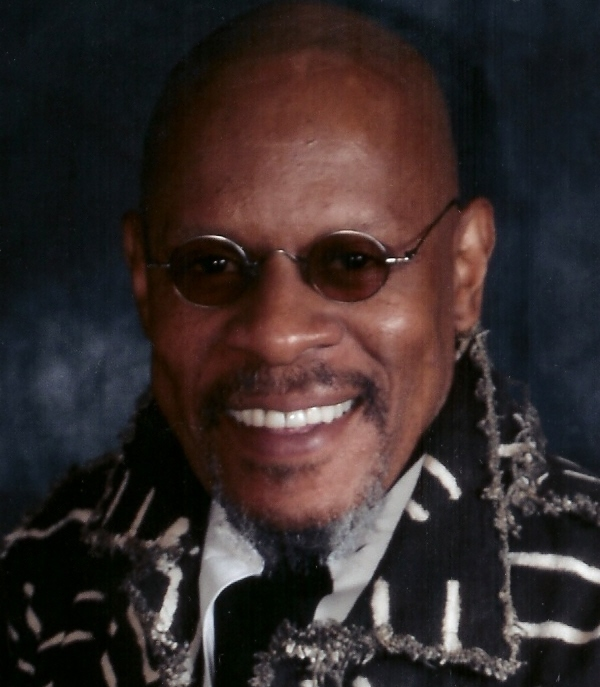
Avery Brooks played Benjamin Sisko in Deep Space Nine, commander of the titular space station

Star Trek: Deep Space Nine, frequently abbreviated as DS9, takes place during the last years and the immediate post-years of The Next Generation (2369–2375) and aired for seven seasons, from January 3, 1993, to June 2, 1999. Like The Next Generation, Deep Space Nine aired in syndication in the United States and Canada. Unlike the other Star Trek series, DS9 takes place primarily on a space station rather than aboard a starship.

The cast included:

- Avery Brooks as Benjamin Sisko
- René Auberjonois as Constable Odo
- Nicole de Boer as Ezri Dax
- Michael Dorn as Worf
- Terry Farrell as Jadzia Dax
- Cirroc Lofton as Jake Sisko
- Colm Meaney as Miles O'Brien (reprising his role from the Next Generation)
- Armin Shimerman as Quark
- Alexander Siddig as Julian Bashir (Credited as Siddig El Fadil seasons 1–3)
- Nana Visitor as Kira Nerys

The series begins in the aftermath of the brutal occupation of the planet Bajor by the imperialistic Cardassians. The liberated Bajoran people ask the United Federation of Planets to help run a Cardassian-built space station, Deep Space Nine, near Bajor. After the Federation takes control of the station, the protagonists of the series discover a uniquely stable wormhole that provides immediate access to the distant Gamma Quadrant making Bajor and the station one of the most strategically important locations in the galaxy. The series chronicles the adventures of the station's crew, led by Commander (later Captain) Benjamin Sisko, played by Avery Brooks, and Major (later Colonel) Kira Nerys, played by Nana Visitor. Recurring plot elements include the repercussions of the Cardassian occupation of Bajor, Sisko's role as a figure in Bajoran religious prophecy, and in later seasons a war with an empire from the Gamma Quadrant known as the Dominion.

Deep Space Nine stands apart from earlier Trek series for its lengthy serialized storytelling, conflict within the crew, and religious themes—all elements that critics and audiences praised but Roddenberry forbade in the original series and The Next Generation.

=== Voyager (1995–2001) ===
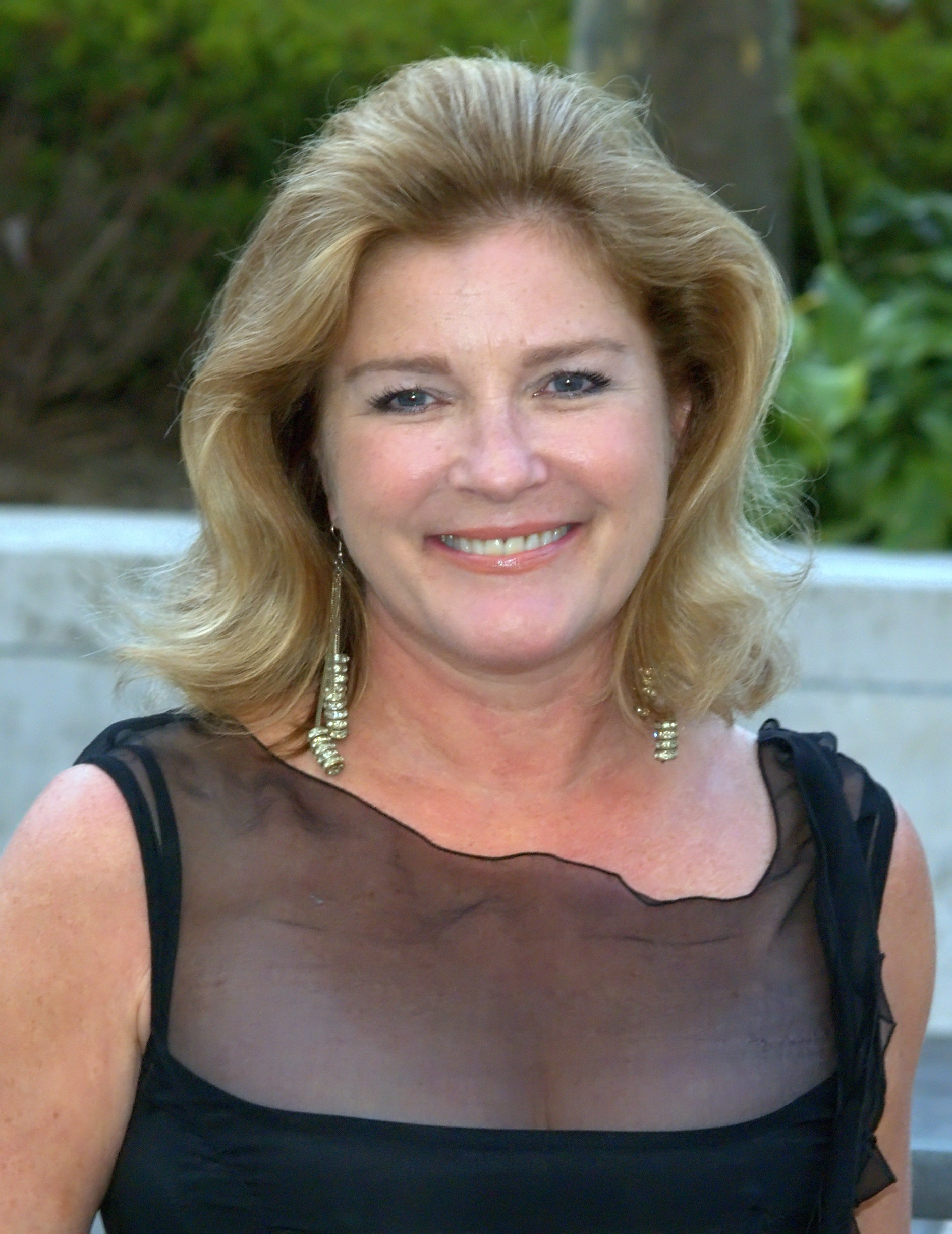
Kate Mulgrew played Kathryn Janeway, the lead character in Voyager, and the first female commanding officer in a leading role of a Star Trek series

Star Trek: Voyager ran for seven seasons, airing from January 16, 1995, to May 23, 2001, launching a new Paramount-owned television network, UPN. It features Kate Mulgrew as Captain Kathryn Janeway, the first female commanding officer in a leading role of a Star Trek series, and Commander Chakotay, played by Robert Beltran.

The cast included:

- Kate Mulgrew as Kathryn Janeway
- Robert Beltran as Chakotay
- Roxann Dawson as B'Elanna Torres
- Jennifer Lien as Kes
- Robert Duncan McNeill as Tom Paris
- Ethan Phillips as Neelix
- Robert Picardo as The Doctor
- Tim Russ as Tuvok
- Jeri Ryan as Seven of Nine
- Garrett Wang as Harry Kim

Voyager takes place at about the same time period as Deep Space Nine and the years following that series' end (2371–2378). The premiere episode has the USS Voyager and its crew pursue a Maquis (Federation rebels) ship. Both ships become stranded in the Delta Quadrant about 70,000 light-years from Earth. Faced with a 75-year voyage to Earth, the crew must learn to work together to overcome challenges on their long and perilous journey home while also seeking ways to shorten the voyage. Like Deep Space Nine, early seasons of Voyager feature more conflict between its crew members than seen in later episodes. Such conflict often arises from friction between "by-the-book" Starfleet crew and rebellious Maquis fugitives forced by circumstance to work together on Voyager. Eventually, though, they settle their differences, after which the overall tone becomes more reminiscent of The Original Series. Isolated from its home, the starship Voyager faces new cultures and dilemmas not possible in other series based in the Alpha Quadrant. Later seasons brought in an influx of characters and cultures from prior series, such as the Borg, Q, the Ferengi, Romulans, Klingons, Cardassians and cast members of The Next Generation.

=== Enterprise (2001–2005) ===
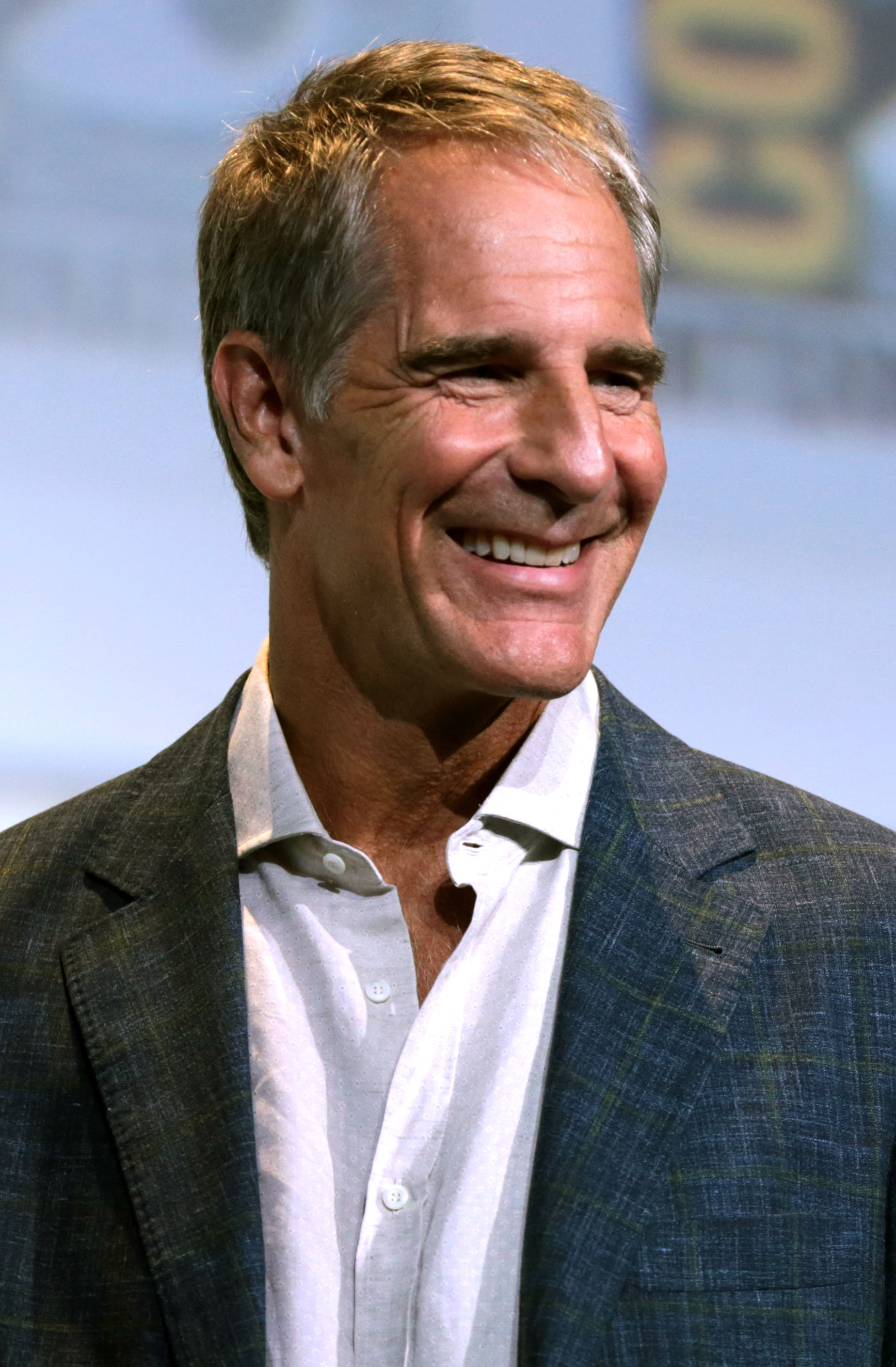
Scott Bakula played Jonathan Archer, the lead character in Enterprise

Star Trek: Enterprise, originally titled Enterprise, is a prequel to the original Star Trek series. It aired from September 26, 2001, to May 13, 2005. Enterprise takes place in the 2150s, some 90 years after the events of Zefram Cochrane's first warp flight and about a decade before the founding of the Federation. The series centers on the voyages of Earth's first warp 5 capable starship, Enterprise, commanded by Captain Jonathan Archer (played by Scott Bakula), and the Vulcan Sub-Commander T'Pol (played by Jolene Blalock). The series originally did not include "Star Trek" in its name and logo, adding it later on in the series' run.

- Scott Bakula as Jonathan Archer
- Jolene Blalock as T'Pol
- John Billingsley as Phlox
- Dominic Keating as Malcolm Reed
- Anthony Montgomery as Travis Mayweather
- Linda Park as Hoshi Sato
- Connor Trinneer as Trip Tucker

During the series' first two seasons, Enterprise featured self-contained episodes, like The Original Series, The Next Generation and Voyager. The entire third season consisted of one arc related to the Xindi, and had a darker tone and serialized nature similar to that of Deep Space Nine. The fourth and final season consisted of several mini-arcs composed of two to three episodes. The final season showed the origins of some elements of previous series, and resolved some of their continuity problems. Ratings for Enterprise started strong but declined rapidly. Although critics received the fourth season well, both fans and the cast criticized the series finale, partly because of the episode's focus on the guest appearance of cast members of The Next Generation. The cancellation of Enterprise ended an 18-year run of back-to-back new Star Trek television series, which began with The Next Generation in 1987.

== Streaming series ==
Seven television series make up the Star Trek streaming franchise: Discovery, Short Treks, Picard, Lower Decks, Prodigy, Strange New Worlds, and Starfleet Academy. All series in total amount to 245 episodes across 22 seasons of television.

=== Discovery (2017–2024) ===
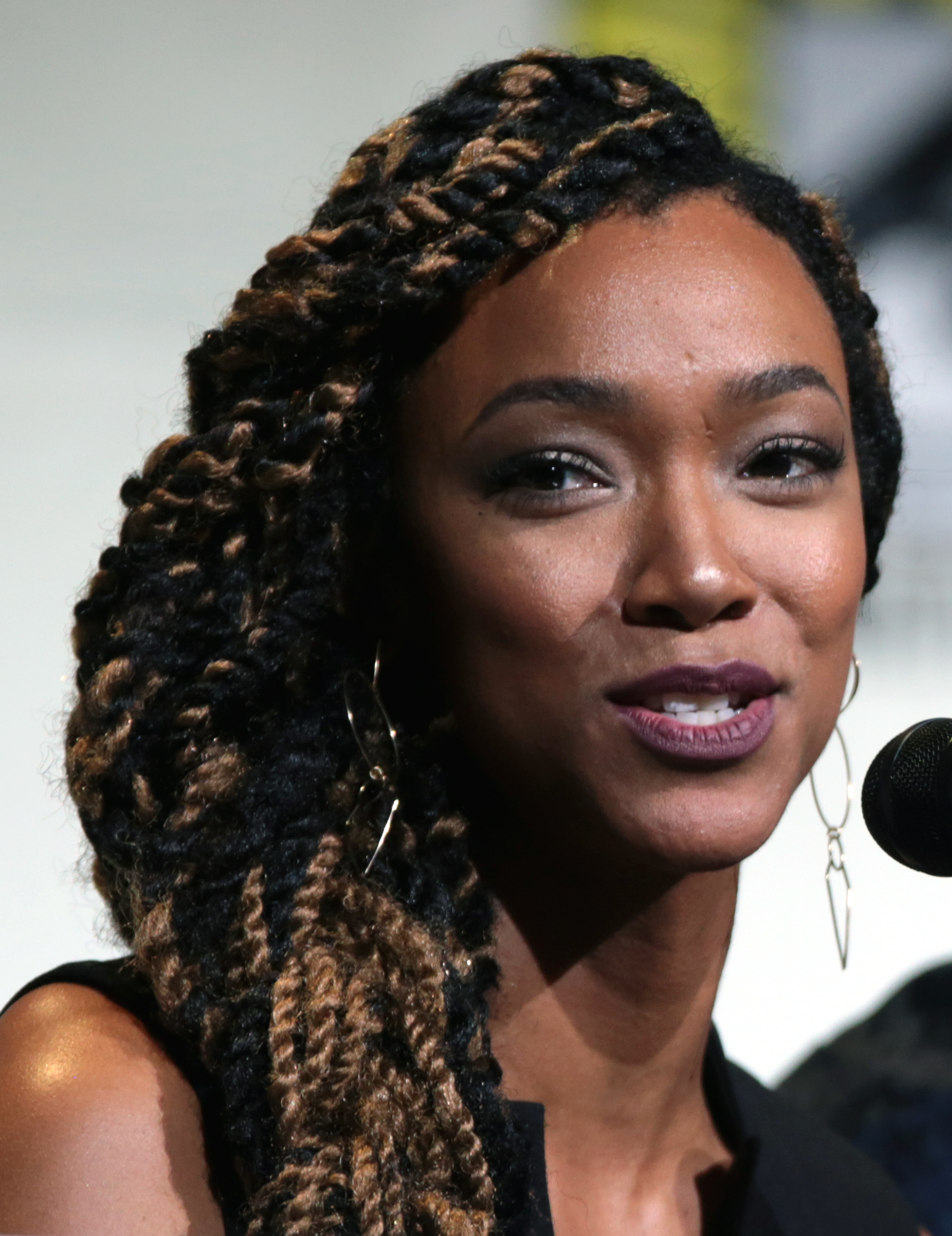
Sonequa Martin-Green plays Michael Burnham, the lead character in Discovery

Star Trek: Discovery begins as a prequel to The Original Series, set roughly ten years prior. It premiered September 24, 2017, in the United States and Canada on CBS before moving to CBS All Access, while Netflix streams the series outside the United States and is also providing most of the series' funding.

The cast includes:

- Sonequa Martin-Green as Michael Burnham
- Doug Jones as Saru
- Anthony Rapp as Paul Stamets
- Mary Wiseman as Sylvia Tilly
- Shazad Latif as Ash Tyler / Voq
- Jason Isaacs as Gabriel Lorca
- Wilson Cruz as Hugh Culber
- Anson Mount as Christopher Pike
- David Ajala as Cleveland Booker
- Blu del Barrio as Adira Tal
- Tig Notaro as Jett Reno

The series centers on the voyages of the USS Discovery, a unique starship with an experimental "spore drive", commanded in Season 1 by Captain Gabriel Lorca (Jason Isaacs), in Season 2 by Captain Christopher Pike (Anson Mount), and in Season 3 by Captain Saru (Doug Jones). The protagonist of the series is Michael Burnham (Sonequa Martin-Green), a science specialist who becomes captain of Discovery at the end of the third season. The first season focuses on Discovery's involvement in a war between the United Federation of Planets and the Klingon Empire; later seasons see the Discovery crew fighting a rogue artificial intelligence and, sent into the distant future, trying to reunite a fractured Federation.

=== Short Treks (2018–2020) ===
Star Trek: Short Treks is a spin-off companion series of stand-alone short films which focus on characters and situations from Discovery and Picard. Some of the episodes are animated.

=== Picard (2020–2023) ===
Star Trek: Picard, like Discovery, is a serialized drama created for CBS All Access; it premiered on January 23, 2020. Set about 30 years after The Next Generation, the series sees Patrick Stewart reprise his TNG role of Jean-Luc Picard. The first season follows Picard in his retirement, seeking redemption for what he sees as his past failings, as he goes on an adventure to save the daughter of his late crewmate Data. Later seasons bring back more characters from the franchise, including the main Next Generation cast. Picard premiered on January 23, 2020.

The cast includes:

- Patrick Stewart as Jean-Luc Picard
- Alison Pill as Agnes Jurati
- Isa Briones as Dahj Asha, Soji Asha, and Kore Soong
- Michelle Hurd as Raffi Musiker
- Santiago Cabrera as Cristóbal "Chris" Rios
- Harry Treadaway as Narek
- Evan Evagora as Elnor
- Jeri Ryan as Seven of Nine
- Orla Brady as Laris and Tallinn
- Brent Spiner as Altan Soong, Adam Soong, Lore and Data

=== Lower Decks (2020–2024) ===
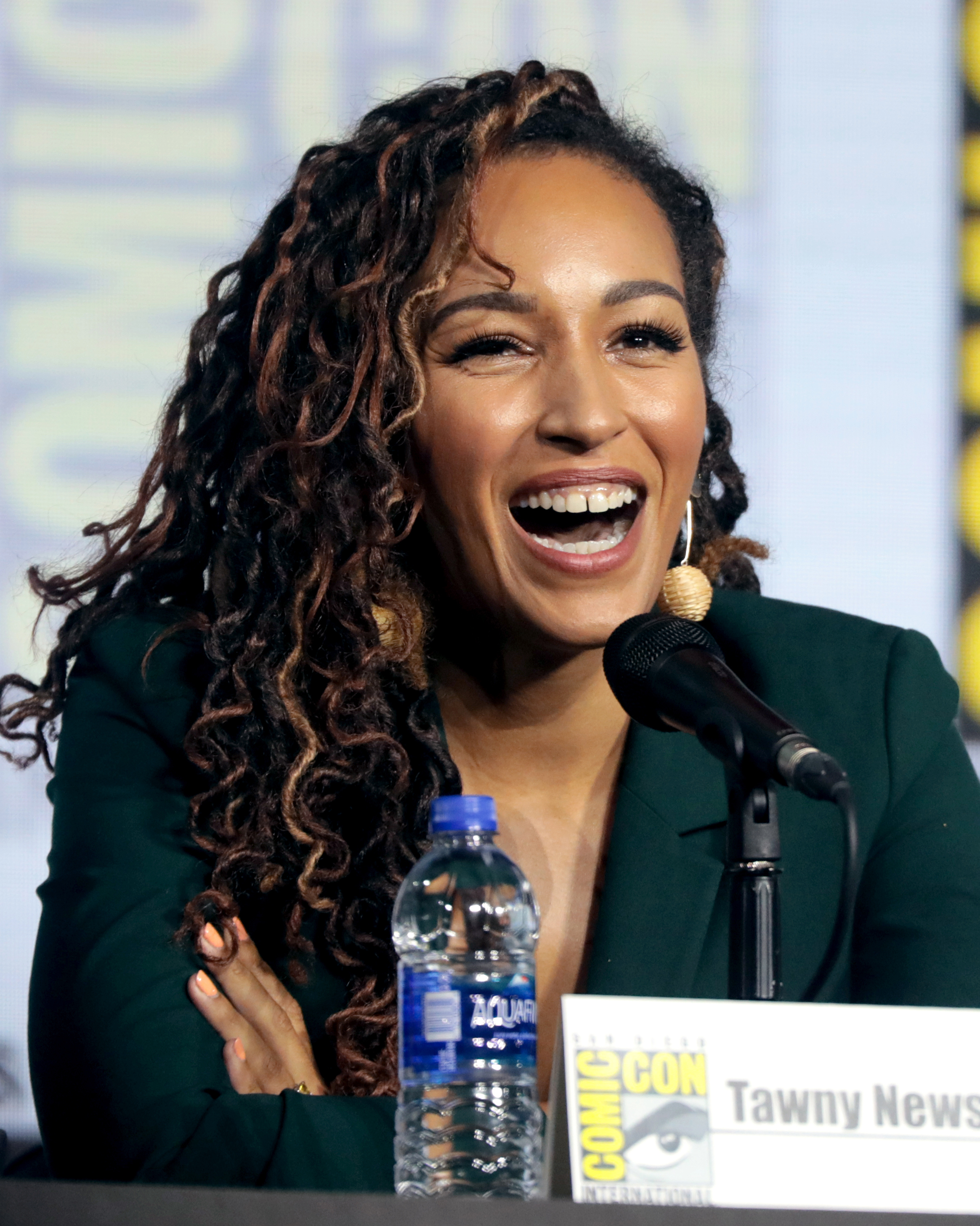
Tawny Newsome voices Beckett Mariner, the lead character in Lower Decks

Star Trek: Lower Decks was announced on October 25, 2018, by CBS All Access as a two-season order for a half-hour adult animated comedy series created by Mike McMahan, the head writer and executive producer of Rick and Morty. It focuses on the support crew of "one of Starfleet's least important ships", and its name is taken from a Next Generation episode that similarly focused on low-ranking starship crew members. The series premiered on August 6, 2020.

The cast includes:

- Tawny Newsome as Beckett Mariner
- Jack Quaid as Brad Boimler
- Noël Wells as D'Vana Tendi
- Eugene Cordero as Sam Rutherford
- Dawnn Lewis as Carol Freeman
- Jerry O'Connell as Jack Ransom
- Fred Tatasciore as Shaxs
- Gillian Vigman as T'Ana

=== Prodigy (2021–2024) ===
In February 2019, it was announced that an animated series developed for young viewers was in development. The series was being co-written and created by Dan and Kevin Hageman and would air on Nickelodeon as a joint-venture with CBS. It focused on a group of teens who embark on an adventure upon an abandoned Starfleet ship. On July 23, 2020, it was announced that the title would be Star Trek: Prodigy; the series premiered on October 28, 2021.

The cast includes:

- Brett Gray as Dal
- Ella Purnell as Gwyn
- Jason Mantzoukas as Jankom Pog
- Angus Imrie as Zero
- Rylee Alazraqui as Rok-Tahk
- Dee Bradley Baker as Murf
- Jimmi Simpson as Drednok
- John Noble as the Diviner
- Kate Mulgrew as Kathryn Janeway

=== Strange New Worlds (2022–present) ===
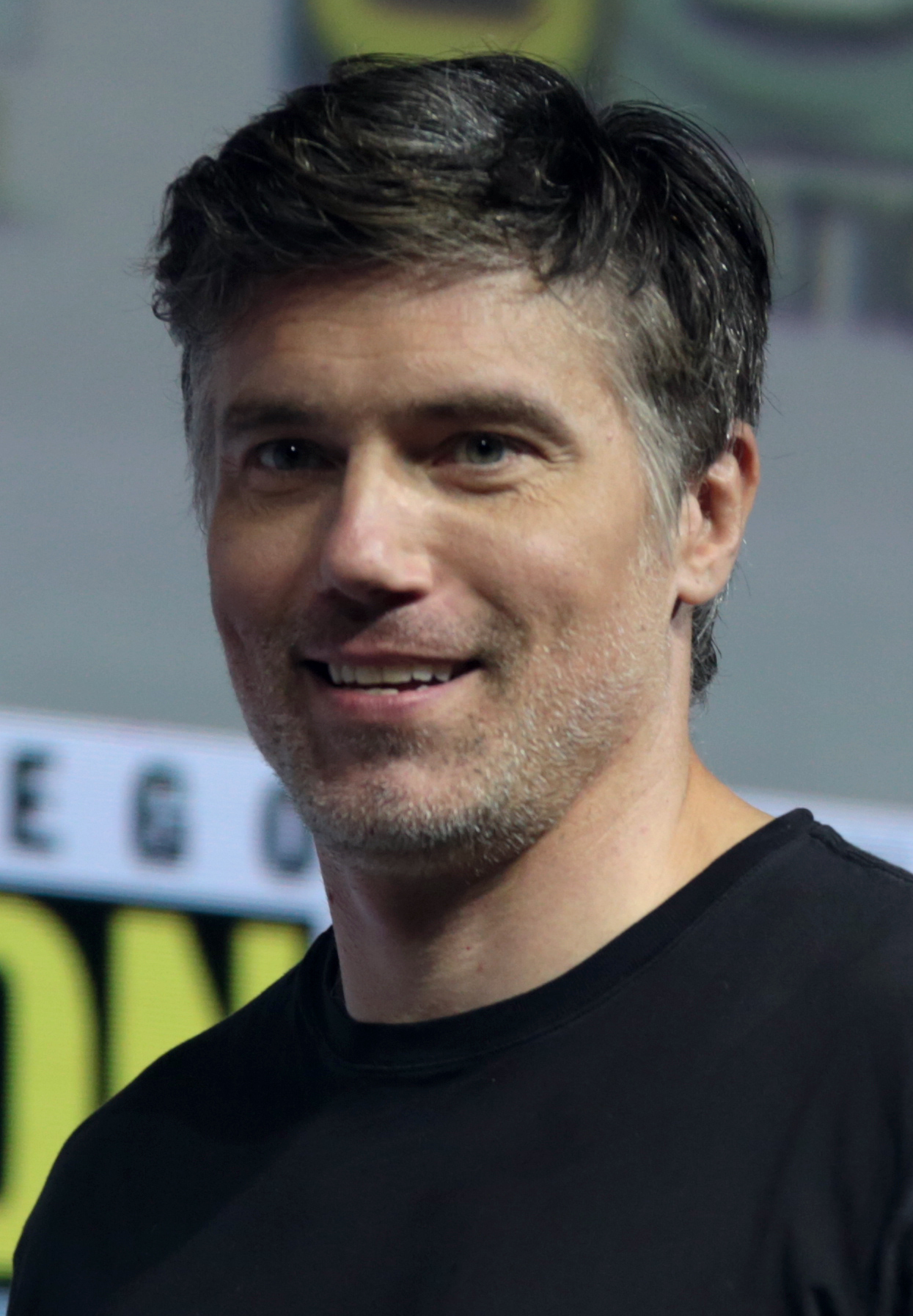
Anson Mount plays Christopher Pike, the lead character in Strange New Worlds

Announced in May 2020, Star Trek: Strange New Worlds depicts the early days of the Enterprise and features Discovery actors Anson Mount, Ethan Peck and Rebecca Romijn reprising their roles as Pike, Spock and Number One, respectively. (Note: These characters first appeared on the original Star Trek pilot, "The Cage".) Creator Akiva Goldsman intended for the series to use an episodic format similar to The Original Series and The Next Generation. It was released on Paramount+. The series debuted on May 5, 2022.

The cast includes:

- Anson Mount as Christopher Pike
- Ethan Peck as Spock
- Jess Bush as Christine Chapel
- Christina Chong as La'an Noonien-Singh
- Celia Rose Gooding as Nyota Uhura
- Melissa Navia as Erica Ortegas
- Babs Olusanmokun as Joseph M'Benga
- Bruce Horak as Hemmer
- Rebecca Romijn as Una "Number One" Chin-Riley

=== Starfleet Academy (2026–present) ===
In March 2023, Starfleet Academy was greenlit by Paramount+, and started production in August 2024; it depicts a new class of cadets learning to be Starfleet officers in an era after a cataclysmic event has weakened the Federation. Alex Kurtzman and Noga Landau serve as the showrunners. Starfleet Academy premiered on January 16, 2026.

The cast includes:

- Holly Hunter as Nahla Ake, the chancellor of Starfleet Academy
- Sandro Rosta as Caleb Mir
- Karim Diané as Jay-Den Kraag
- Kerrice Brooks as Sam (Series Acclimation Mil)
- George Hawkins as Darem Reymi
- Bella Shepard as Genesis Lythe
- Zoë Steiner as Tarima Sadal
- Oded Fehr as Charles Vance, the commander-in-chief of Starfleet, reprising his role from Discovery
- Gina Yashere as Lura Thok
- Brit Marling as the starship Athena's computer
- Stephen Colbert as the voice of the Academy's digital dean of students
- Robert Picardo as the Doctor, reprising his role from Voyager
- Tig Notaro as Jett Reno, reprising her role from Discovery

== Reception ==
=== Critical response ===
Critical response of Star Trek series
Title	Season	Rotten Tomatoes	Metacritic
The Original Series	1	92% (25 reviews)	—N/a
The Original Series	2	100% (6 reviews)	—N/a
The Original Series	3	50% (10 reviews)	—N/a
The Animated Series	1	94% (17 reviews)	—N/a
The Next Generation	1	88% (24 reviews)	51 (8 reviews)
The Next Generation	2	50% (6 reviews)	—N/a
The Next Generation	3	100% (8 reviews)	—N/a
The Next Generation	4	100% (7 reviews)	—N/a
The Next Generation	5	100% (6 reviews)	—N/a
The Next Generation	6	100% (5 reviews)	—N/a
The Next Generation	7	100% (10 reviews)	—N/a
Deep Space Nine	1	81% (21 reviews)	74 (14 reviews)
Deep Space Nine	2	100% (5 reviews)	—N/a
Deep Space Nine	3	100% (5 reviews)	—N/a
Deep Space Nine	4	100% (7 reviews)	—N/a
Deep Space Nine	5	100% (6 reviews)	—N/a
Deep Space Nine	6	57% (7 reviews)	—N/a
Deep Space Nine	7	100% (13 reviews)	—N/a
Voyager	1	85% (20 reviews)	66 (10 reviews)
Voyager	2	33% (6 reviews)	—N/a
Voyager	3	100% (8 reviews)	—N/a
Voyager	4	100% (6 reviews)	—N/a
Voyager	5	80% (5 reviews)	—N/a
Voyager	7	60% (10 reviews)	—N/a
Enterprise	1	72% (18 reviews)	66 (18 reviews)
Enterprise	2	33% (6 reviews)	—N/a
Enterprise	3	57% (7 reviews)	—N/a
Enterprise	4	60% (5 reviews)	—N/a
Discovery	1	82% (373 reviews)	72 (20 reviews)
Discovery	2	81% (209 reviews)	72 (10 reviews)
Discovery	3	91% (34 reviews)	75 (8 reviews)
Discovery	4	93% (15 reviews)	—N/a
Discovery	5	79% (19 reviews)	—N/a
Picard	1	87% (253 reviews)	76 (27 reviews)
Picard	2	85% (94 reviews)	69 (7 reviews)
Picard	3	100% (46 reviews)	83 (14 reviews)
Lower Decks	1	67% (46 reviews)	59 (17 reviews)
Lower Decks	2	100% (11 reviews)	—N/a
Lower Decks	3	100% (5 reviews)	—N/a
Lower Decks	4	100% (11 reviews)	—N/a
Lower Decks	5	100% (9 reviews)	—N/a
Prodigy	1	93% (15 reviews)	68 (5 reviews)
Prodigy	2	100% (6 reviews)	—N/a
Strange New Worlds	1	99% (78 reviews)	76 (14 reviews)
Strange New Worlds	2	98% (34 reviews)	88 (11 reviews)
Strange New Worlds	3	88% (33 reviews)	75 (11 reviews)
Strange New Worlds	4	100% (14 reviews)	72 (9 reviews)
Starfleet Academy	1	87% (45 reviews)	66 (24 reviews)

=== Episode rankings ===
==== TV Guide (1996) ====
In 1996, TV Guide published the following as the ten best Star Trek episodes for the franchise's 30th anniversary:

1. "The City on the Edge of Forever" (The Original Series)
2. "Amok Time" (The Original Series)
3. "Mirror, Mirror" (The Original Series)
4. "The Doomsday Machine" (The Original Series)
5. "Journey to Babel" (The Original Series)
6. "11001001" (The Next Generation)
7. "Yesterday's Enterprise" (The Next Generation)
8. "The Best of Both Worlds" (Part I) (The Next Generation)
9. "Tapestry" (The Next Generation)
10. "The Visitor" (Deep Space Nine)

==== 50th Anniversary Convention (2016) ====
At the 50th Anniversary Star Trek Las Vegas (STLV) convention, in 2016, the following were voted by fans as the best episodes:

1. "The City on the Edge of Forever" (The Original Series)
2. "In the Pale Moonlight" (Deep Space Nine)
3. "The Inner Light" (The Next Generation)
4. "Amok Time" (The Original Series)
5. "Yesterday's Enterprise" (The Next Generation)
6. "The Visitor" (Deep Space Nine)
7. "Chain of Command" (The Next Generation)
8. "Balance of Terror" (The Original Series)
9. "In a Mirror, Darkly" (Enterprise)
10. "The Magnificent Ferengi" (Deep Space Nine)

Additionally, fans voted the following as the worst episodes:

1. "These Are the Voyages..." (Enterprise)
2. "Code of Honor" (The Next Generation)
3. "Threshold" (Voyager)
4. "Turnabout Intruder" (The Original Series)
5. "Shades of Gray" (The Next Generation)
6. "Sub Rosa" (The Next Generation)
7. "And the Children Shall Lead" (The Original Series)
8. "Move Along Home" (Deep Space Nine)
9. "The Alternative Factor" (The Original Series)
10. "Precious Cargo" (Enterprise)

==== Washington Post (2016) ====
In 2016, The Washington Post ranked the best live-action television episodes:

1. "The Best of Both Worlds" (The Next Generation)
2. "Darmok" (The Next Generation)
3. "Balance of Terror" (The Original Series)
4. "In the Pale Moonlight" (Deep Space Nine)
5. "Chain of Command" (The Next Generation)
6. "Yesterday's Enterprise" (The Next Generation)
7. "The Doomsday Machine" (The Original Series)
8. "The Measure of a Man" (The Next Generation)
9. "Journey to Babel" (The Original Series)
10. "First Contact" (The Next Generation)

== Future ==
In July 2024, Justin Simien and Lower Decks star Tawny Newsome announced that they were developing the first Star Trek live-action comedy series. The pair met when Simien was a guest on Star Trek: The Pod Directive, the official Star Trek podcast that is hosted by Newsome, and their pitch for the series grew from their shared love of character-focused Deep Space Nine and The Next Generation episodes that were not "plot heavy". Set in the 25th century, the series follows "Federation outsiders" whose lives working on a resort planet are broadcast to viewers across the quadrant. The tone was compared to the comedy series The Office and Parks and Recreation. Kurtzman was open to the new series after being impressed by Newsome's work as a writer on Starfleet Academy, and he was set as a writer and executive producer on the project alongside Simien and Newsome. Newsome and Simien chose to set the series in the 25th century to allow characters from Lower Decks and Picard to appear in it.

== Failed and repurposed series ==
=== Phase II ===
Star Trek: Phase II was a 1970s follow-up live-action television series to The Original Series. Though sets were constructed, scripts written, characters cast, and production started, the series was cancelled in favor of The Motion Picture — the first Star Trek feature film — adapted from the script of Phase II's feature-length pilot episode "In Thy Image".

The series would have anchored a fourth American television network, the Paramount Television Service. This would later happen when Star Trek: Voyager anchored the launch of UPN, the United Paramount Network in the 1990s.

=== Khan ===
In June 2017, Nicholas Meyer revealed he had begun development of a 3-episode limited series titled Ceti Alpha V, based around the character Khan Noonien Singh and acting as a prequel to his The Wrath of Khan storyline. By September 2022, the series had been redeveloped into a scripted podcast series titled Star Trek: Khan – Ceti Alpha V, later retitled to Star Trek: Khan.

=== Section 31 ===
Announced in January 2019, a live-action television series, with a tentative title Section 31 would focus on the mirror universe's Philippa Georgiou and her adventures as a member of Starfleet's Section 31 division. Michelle Yeoh would reprise her role from Discovery, with Bo Yeon Kim and Erika Lippoldt serving as co-showrunners. The series was reported to feature an ensemble cast. In April 2023, the project was announced to be redeveloped as a film for Paramount+, with Olatunde Osunsanmi directing from a script by Craig Sweeny.

== See also ==
- List of Star Trek production staff
- List of Star Trek films
- Star Trek: Very Short Treks
