= List of Star Trek films and television series =

List of Star Trek films and television series may refer to:

- List of Star Trek films
- List of Star Trek television series
