= Turnabout Intruder =

- Star Trek: The Original Series episode
- Episode no.: Season 3 Episode 24
- Directed by: Herb Wallerstein
- Story by: Gene Roddenberry
- Teleplay by: Arthur H. Singer
- Cinematography by: Al Francis
- Editing by: Donald R. Rode
- Production code: 079
- Original air date: June 3, 1969

Guest appearances
- Sandra Smith – Dr. Janice Lester / Capt. James T. Kirk (when trapped in Dr. Janice Lester's body); Harry Landers – Dr. Arthur Coleman; Barbara Baldavin – Communications Officer Lisa; David L. Ross – Lt. Galoway; John Boyer – Guard; Roger Holloway – Lt. Lemli

Episode chronology
← Previous "All Our Yesterdays"	Next → —
- Star Trek: The Original Series season 3

"Turnabout Intruder" is the twenty-fourth and final episode of the third season of the American science fiction television series Star Trek. Written by Arthur H. Singer (based on a story by Gene Roddenberry) and directed by Herb Wallerstein, it was first broadcast on June 3, 1969.

In the episode, a woman switches bodies with Captain Kirk and then tries to take over command of the Enterprise.

Originally scheduled to air at 10pm on Friday, March 28, 1969, NBC pre-empted it with a special report on former U.S. President Dwight D. Eisenhower, who had died earlier that day. On June 3, 1969, after an absence of two months, Star Trek was brought back on a new night and time: Tuesdays at 7:30pm. "Turnabout Intruder" was the only first-run episode to be shown in this new time slot.

This was the last original episode of Star Trek to air on NBC.

== Plot ==
The Federation starship Enterprise answers a distress call from the planet Camus II, the site of an archaeological expedition. Among the survivors are Dr. Janice Lester, with whom Captain Kirk was once intimately involved, and the expedition's physician, Dr. Arthur Coleman. Coleman claims that Lester is suffering from radiation exposure.

While Lester and Kirk are alone they reminisce about their time together at Starfleet Academy. Lester blames sexism within Starfleet for her failure to become captain. When Kirk explores the room, she activates an alien machine that traps and paralyzes him. She then enters the machine herself and the machine switches their life-entity. The new "Kirk" declares that he will take command of the Enterprise and begins to strangle "Lester" but the returning Spock and McCoy interrupt him.

Back on the ship, over McCoy's protests, "Kirk" gives Dr. Coleman full authority for treatment of "Lester" and it is revealed that Lester and Coleman conspired to kill the expedition's personnel.

Spock becomes suspicious when "Kirk" orders a course change to the Benecia Colony to drop off "Lester" for medical attention, despite the fact that Benecia's medical facilities are comparatively primitive, and that it would unnecessarily interfere with their current mission. McCoy invokes his authority to order a medical examination of the captain, including a personality test.

"Lester" regains consciousness and seeks help from Spock and McCoy. "Kirk" slaps her back into unconsciousness, and orders her to be put in isolation. Spock interviews "Lester" and is somewhat skeptical of her story. "Lester" suggests that he use his telepathic abilities to learn the truth, and he is convinced.

Spock tries to free "Lester" but is stopped by a security team led by the impostor Kirk, who accuses Spock of mutiny and orders a court-martial. Once on trial, Spock argues that Captain Kirk is really in the body of Dr. Lester. "Kirk" suggests that Spock's real goal is to take command himself and offers to drop charges if Spock will desist. Spock refuses, and "Kirk" flies into a hysterical rage.

Shocked by Kirk's behavior, McCoy and Chief Engineer Scott confer secretly in the corridor. Scott believes that if Spock is acquitted, the "captain" will not let the decision stand, making it necessary to mutiny. "Kirk", having monitored their conversation, declares McCoy, Scott, Spock, and "Lester" guilty of mutiny and condemned to death.

On the bridge, Chekov and Sulu, having witnessed the trial, determine to resist the "captain", and refuse to obey his orders. Loudly accusing them of mutiny, "Kirk" falls into his chair, and an image of Lester emerges from his body, only to return again. "Kirk" runs to Coleman, who tells him that the transfer is reversing itself, and that Kirk, in Lester's body, must die in order to prevent it. The two head to the brig intending to inject "Lester" with a toxic substance. "Lester" resists, and the reversal now completes itself. Realizing she has lost her triple attempt to kill Kirk, destroy her female gender, and gain the ability to command a starship, she suffers a complete mental breakdown; the hysterical Lester begs Coleman to kill Kirk. Coleman then pleads with Kirk to allow him to care for her. Coleman and Lester are escorted to Sickbay. Kirk, Spock, and Scotty proceed to the Bridge and the Enterprise proceeds on its mission.

== Production ==
"Turnabout Intruder" not only marked the final appearance of all main and supporting cast members of the show but also the last appearance of regular background actors David L. Ross (Lieutenant Galloway), William Blackburn (Lieutenant Hadley and DeForest Kelley's stand-in), and Roger Holloway (Lieutenant Lemli and James Doohan's stand-in). Blackburn had appeared in more episodes than cast members George Takei and Walter Koenig, and Holloway's appearances were only two episodes short of Koenig. Galloway had been a background actor since the first season.

Nichelle Nichols (Lieutenant Uhura) was absent from this episode. The position of Communications Officer was played by Barbara Baldavin, who had previously appeared in two first-season episodes of the show, "Balance of Terror" and "Shore Leave".

As noted in the 1975 book Star Trek Lives! by co-author Joan Winston, William Shatner was sick with flu during the filming of the episode (Winston was on set for six days of filming).

Filming of the episode was completed on January 9, 1969, having gone one day over schedule; a few days earlier, the crew had been notified of the cancellation of the show. The episode aired in the United States on June 3, 1969.

== Reception ==
The episode drew Nielsen ratings of only 8.8, in contrast to rival shows Lancer on CBS and The Mod Squad on ABC, which gained ratings of 14.7 and 15.2 respectively, a drop of over fifty percent since the show premiered.

Cultural theorist Cassandra Amesley states that this episode is "agreed to be one of the worst Star Trek episodes ever shown" by Star Trek fans.

David Greven has a more positive view of the episode, even referring to it as "moving". He calls it the "infamous last episode" of the original series, in part because of the "campiness" of Shatner's performance when portraying himself as a female in a male's body, but also because of the sexist premise that "female desire for power was a clear sign of insanity."

In 2016, CNET ranked this episode as the fourth-worst episode of all Star Trek, based on rankings between an audience and discussion hosts at a 50th anniversary Star Trek convention in Las Vegas.

In 2017, this episode was rated the fourth worst episode of the Star Trek franchise including later spin-off series, by ScreenRant. A ranking of every episode of the original series by Hollywood, placed this episode as worst. In 2017, Den of Geek ranked this episode as the seventh worst Star Trek episode of the original series.

In 2024, Hollywood.com ranked "Turnabout Intruder" as the very last out of the 79 original series episode.
