= Dagger of the Mind =

- Star Trek: The Original Series episode
- Episode no.: Season 1 Episode 9
- Directed by: Vincent McEveety
- Written by: Shimon Wincelberg (credited as S. Bar-David)
- Cinematography by: Jerry Finnerman
- Production code: 011
- Original air date: November 3, 1966

Guest appearances
- James Gregory – Dr. Tristan Adams; Morgan Woodward – Dr. Simon van Gelder; Marianna Hill – Dr. Helen Noel; Larry Anthony – Mr. Berkley (credited as Transportation Man); Susanne Wasson – Lethe; John Arndt – Fields (credited as First Crewman); Eli Behar – Therapist Eli; Ed McCready – Inmate; Lou Elias – Therapist Guard; Eddie Paskey – Lt. Leslie; Frank da Vinci – Vinci; Irene Sale

Episode chronology
← Previous "Miri"	Next → "The Corbomite Maneuver"
- Star Trek: The Original Series season 1

"Dagger of the Mind" is the ninth episode of the first season of the American science fiction television series Star Trek. Written by Shimon Wincelberg (under the pen name "S. Bar-David") and directed by Vincent McEveety, it first aired on November 3, 1966.

In the episode, the Enterprise visits a rehabilitation facility for the criminally insane where the chief doctor has been using a device which destroys the human mind.

This episode introduces the Vulcan mind meld.

The title is taken from a soliloquy by the title character in William Shakespeare's play Macbeth.

== Plot ==
The USS Enterprise, commanded by Captain Kirk, makes a supply run to planet Tantalus V, a colony where the criminally insane are confined for treatment. The facility's director is Dr. Tristan Adams, a psychiatrist famous for advocating more humane treatment of such patients. After the Enterprise delivers supplies and receives cargo from Tantalus, a man emerges from the container taken aboard and assaults a technician. Reaching the bridge, the intruder demands asylum, but Spock subdues him with a Vulcan nerve pinch. In sickbay, the intruder identifies himself as Simon van Gelder, and a computer check reveals that he is not a patient, but Dr. Adams's assistant.

When they inform Tantalus of van Gelder's capture, Dr. Adams claims that van Gelder's testing of an experimental treatment device on himself is responsible for his disturbed condition. McCoy, suspicious, urges Kirk to investigate. Kirk transports down to the colony with one of the ship's psychiatrists, Dr. Helen Noel.

Adams introduces them to a strangely emotionless therapist, Lethe, and gives Kirk and Noel a tour of the colony. Although he is affable and accommodating, his staff, like Lethe, all seem lacking in affect. Adams shows Kirk and Noel the treatment device he referred to: a "neural neutralizer". He claims that the machine, harmless at low intensity, is used only to calm agitated inmates. Noel is satisfied with his explanation, but Kirk remains suspicious.

On the Enterprise van Gelder becomes increasingly frantic, warning that the landing party is in danger, but when he tries to explain the danger and refers to the neural neutralizer, he is convulsed with pain. Spock mind-melds with van Gelder to enable him to tell his story. Spock learns that the neural neutralizer can empty a mind of thoughts, leaving only an unbearable feeling of loneliness, and that Adams has been using it on inmates and staff to gain total control of their minds. The first officer assembles a security team, but the colony's force field blocks transport and communication.

Unaware of events on the ship, Kirk decides to secretly test the neutralizer on himself, with Noel at the controls. She finds that she can easily implant thoughts into Kirk's mind, even altering his memory of a recent Christmas-party encounter between the two of them. Adams appears, overpowers Noel, seizes the controls, increases the neutralizer's intensity, and proceeds to convince Kirk that he has been madly in love with Noel for years. Kirk and Noel are then confined to quarters.

On Kirk's orders, Noel enters the facility's physical plant through a ventilation duct, and interrupts Kirk's next neutralizer session by shutting off power to the entire complex. Freed from the neutralizer, Kirk attacks Adams, leaving him alone and unconscious in the treatment room. A guard discovers Noel's sabotage, they fight, and she defeats him with an athletic kick that sends him hurtling into the high-voltage electric circuitry, killing him. With the force field now temporarily disabled, Spock is able to beam down to the planet, where he permanently disables the force field before restoring power to the colony. This reactivates the neural neutralizer, and without anyone else in the room to say anything, it completely empties Adams' mind, killing him.

Back on the Enterprise, Kirk is informed that van Gelder has destroyed the neural neutralizer. McCoy is surprised that loneliness could be lethal, but Kirk, after his experience, is not.

== Production ==
The episode's title was taken from William Shakespeare's Macbeth. Macbeth is planning to murder the King of Scotland, and sees a dagger that he attempts to grasp, but it's only a hallucination.

Is this a dagger which I see before me
The handle toward my hand? Come, let me clutch thee.
I have thee not, and yet I see thee still
Art thou not, fatal vision, sensible
To feeling as to sight? Or art thou but
A dagger of the mind, a false creation
Proceeding from the heat-oppressèd brain?

Shimon Wincelberg originally wrote a reference to Hillel the Elder's "Torah on one foot" parable, but Roddenberry mandated an attribution to "the ancient skeptic". Wincelberg, incensed by Roddenberry's rewrites, requested a name change to S. Bar-David for the airing.

Playing mentally disturbed Van Gelder took a toll on the actor Morgan Woodward. When he finished filming the episode, he reportedly went home and took a rest for four days.

== Reception ==
In 2010, SciFiNow ranked this the eighth best episode of the original series.

Zack Handlen of The A.V. Club gave the episode a "B" rating, noting that the episode had "a handful of excellent moments (the mind-meld, that damn booth) that don't fit as well as they should". Handlen noted Kirk and Noel's relationship as the plot's "weakest element", and that Adams did not make a compelling villain. On the other hand, he felt that Nimoy made Spock's mind meld sequence "fairly effective". The booth and its effect on Adams were also cited as memorable moments in the episode.

== Legacy and influence ==
In articles in the magazines Starlog and Entertainment Weekly, actor Morgan Woodward called the role of Dr. Simon Van Gelder the most physically and emotionally exhausting acting job of his career. Desperate to get out of Westerns and expand his range, he was cast against type for this episode and was so well regarded that he came on board the following season to play the tragic Capt. Ronald Tracey in "The Omega Glory". Playing Van Gelder reportedly took its toll on his personal life, as he confessed that for three weeks afterwards he was anti-social towards friends and family. He was grateful that this episode opened up whole new opportunities for him.

The second-season South Park episode "Roger Ebert Should Lay Off the Fatty Foods" (S02 E11) is a parody of this episode.

== See also ==
- Whom Gods Destroy (Star Trek: The Original Series)

== Bibliography ==
- "Dagger of the Mind" Side-by-side comparisons before and after remastering at TrekMovie.com
