= Star Trek: The Original Series season 1 =

Star Trek: The Original Series
- Season 1
- DVD and Blu-ray cover
- Starring: William Shatner; Leonard Nimoy; DeForest Kelley
- No. of episodes: 29

Release
- Original network: NBC
- Original release: September 8, 1966 – April 13, 1967

Season chronology
- Next → Season 2

The first season of the American science-fiction television series Star Trek, originally created by Gene Roddenberry, premiered on NBC on September 8, 1966, and concluded on April 13, 1967. The season debuted in Canada on CTV two days before the American premiere, on September 6, 1966. It consisted of 29 episodes, which is the highest number of episodes in a season for the original series of Star Trek. It features William Shatner as Captain James T. Kirk, Leonard Nimoy as Spock, and DeForest Kelley as Leonard McCoy.

== Broadcast history ==
The season originally aired on Thursdays at 8:30 pm (ET) on NBC.

== Cast ==
- William Shatner as Captain James T. Kirk: Commanding officer of the USS Enterprise
- Leonard Nimoy as Commander Spock: The ship's half-human/half-Vulcan science officer and first/executive officer (i.e. second-in-command)
- DeForest Kelley as Lieutenant Commander Dr. Leonard "Bones" McCoy: The ship's chief medical officer and third officer
- James Doohan as Lieutenant Commander Montgomery "Scotty" Scott: The Enterprise's chief engineer and second officer (i.e. third-in-command)
- Nichelle Nichols as Lieutenant Nyota Uhura: The ship's communications officer
- George Takei as Lieutenant Hikaru Sulu: The ship's helmsman
- Majel Barrett as Nurse Christine Chapel: The ship's head nurse (Barrett, who played the ship's first officer, Number One, in "The Cage," also voiced the ship's computer.)
- Grace Lee Whitney as Janice Rand: The captain's yeoman

== Episodes ==
The table below lists episodes by order of their original NBC air date, which sometimes differed from the order of filming and production.

No. overall	No. in season	Title	Directed by	Written by	Original release date	Prod. code	U.S. households (in millions)
1	1	"The Man Trap"	Marc Daniels	George Clayton Johnson	September 8, 1966	06	11.36
The Enterprise visits planet M-113 for routine medical examinations of the husband-and-wife archaeological team stationed there, but the woman has been replaced by a shape-shifting creature, who survives by assuming a new form depending who it meets and extracting the salt from the bodies, killing them.
2	2	"Charlie X"	Lawrence Dobkin	Story by : Gene Roddenberry; Teleplay by : D. C. Fontana	September 15, 1966	08	10.10
The Enterprise picks up Charlie Evans, an unstable 17-year-old boy, who spent 14 years alone on a deserted planet and lacks the training and restraint to handle his superhuman mental powers wisely. This episode serves as the backstory for the unofficial miniseries Star Trek: Of Gods and Men.
3	3	"Where No Man Has Gone Before"	James Goldstone	Samuel A. Peeples	September 22, 1966	02b	10.38
After the Enterprise attempts to cross the Galactic Barrier at the edge of the galaxy, crew members Gary Mitchell and Elizabeth Dehner develop "godlike" psychic powers, which threaten the safety of the crew.
4	4	"The Naked Time"	Marc Daniels	John D. F. Black	September 29, 1966	07	10.05
A strange, intoxicating infection, which lowers the crew's emotional inhibitions, spreads throughout the Enterprise. As the madness spreads, the entire ship is endangered.
5	5	"The Enemy Within"	Leo Penn	Richard Matheson	October 6, 1966	05	9.06
While beaming up from planet Alpha 177, a transporter accident splits Captain Kirk into two beings: one "good", who is weak and indecisive, and one "evil", who is overly aggressive and domineering.
6	6	"Mudd's Women"	Harvey Hart	Story by : Gene Roddenberry; Teleplay by : Stephen Kandel	October 13, 1966	04	9.83
The Enterprise pursues a vessel and rescues its occupants; Harry Mudd, an interstellar con man, is transporting three mysteriously beautiful women to become the wives of dilithium miners.
7	7	"What Are Little Girls Made Of?"	James Goldstone	Robert Bloch	October 20, 1966	10	9.39
In search of Nurse Chapel's fiancé, renowned exobiologist Roger Korby, the Enterprise visits the icy planet Exo III, where Korby has discovered an ancient machine that allows him to duplicate any living person with an android replacement. Korby plans to use the machine to spread controlled androids throughout the Federation, and replaces Captain Kirk with such a duplicate in an effort to take over the Enterprise.
8	8	"Miri"	Vincent McEveety	Adrian Spies	October 27, 1966	12	8.95
After discovering what appears to be a duplicate of the planet Earth, Captain Kirk and his away team find a population ravaged by a strange disease, which only children appear to have survived.
9	9	"Dagger of the Mind"	Vincent McEveety	Shimon Wincelberg (Note: Credited as S. Bar-David)	November 3, 1966	11	9.94
While the Enterprise is on a resupply mission to a rehabilitation colony for the criminally insane, a former doctor — now insane — sneaks on board the ship. Beaming down to the planet, Kirk and a female crew member discover that the chief doctor has been using a device that destroys the human mind. Spock performs a mind meld for the first time in this episode.
10	10	"The Corbomite Maneuver"	Joseph Sargent	Jerry Sohl	November 10, 1966	03	9.55
The Enterprise is menaced by a gigantic alien ship whose commander condemns the crew to death. The alien ship appears all-powerful, and the alien commander refuses all attempts at negotiation, forcing Kirk to employ an unorthodox strategy to save the ship.
11	11	"The Menagerie"	Marc Daniels	Gene Roddenberry	November 17, 1966	16	9.50
12	12	"The Menagerie"	Robert Butler	Gene Roddenberry	November 24, 1966	16	10.21
Part I: Spock hijacks the Enterprise to take his crippled former captain, Christopher Pike, to the forbidden world of Talos IV. He then demands a court martial, where he uses the events of "The Cage" to tell the tale of Pike's captivity on the planet years earlier. Part II: After witnessing the Talosians' capabilities of mental illusion, Kirk realizes that Spock intends to return Pike to the planet to live a life of illusion, unencumbered by his crippled condition.
13	13	"The Conscience of the King"	Gerd Oswald	Barry Trivers	December 8, 1966	13	8.62
While visiting an old friend, Kirk suspects a Shakespearean actor may actually be the murderous former governor of Tarsus IV ("Kodos the Executioner"), where Kirk grew up. Kirk invites the acting troupe aboard the Enterprise to investigate. Spock discovers that there had been only nine people who could have identified Kodos, but seven of them were murdered when the troupe was nearby. He is certain that Captain Kirk and Lieutenant Riley, the only remaining witnesses, are the next targets.
14	14	"Balance of Terror"	Vincent McEveety	Paul Schneider	December 15, 1966	09	8.51
While investigating a series of destroyed outposts, the Enterprise discovers a lone Romulan vessel with a cloaking device. The Romulans, having never been seen by humans, are revealed to visually resemble Vulcans, casting doubt on Mr. Spock's loyalty, as the two ships become locked in a cat-and-mouse battle through space.
15	15	"Shore Leave"	Robert Sparr	Theodore Sturgeon	December 29, 1966	17	10.10
Captain Kirk orders shore leave for the Enterprise crew on a seemingly uninhabited planet in the Omicron Delta system. The landing parties begin to see strange sights, such as a White Rabbit a la "Alice in Wonderland", Don Juan, and a sword-wielding samurai. Also, Kirk sees (and fights) an image of Finnegan, a rival from his Starfleet Academy days. Spock discovers that the planet seems to be drawing a large amount of energy from the ship's engines, placing the Enterprise in danger.
16	16	"The Galileo Seven"	Robert Gist	Story by : Oliver Crawford; Teleplay by : Oliver Crawford and Shimon Wincelberg	January 5, 1967	14	8.89
Spock and a scientific party are sent to study the Murasaki 312 quasar aboard the shuttle Galileo. During the survey, the Galileo is forced to make an emergency landing on the planet Taurus II, where the crew fights the planet's dangerous inhabitants. As the crew begins to make repairs, Scotty determines that the shuttle does not have enough fuel to reach orbit carrying all seven passengers, and Spock must contemplate leaving some of his fellow crew behind.
17	17	"The Squire of Gothos"	Don McDougall	Paul Schneider	January 12, 1967	18	10.82
The Enterprise discovers a rogue planet drifting through space, inhabited by an eccentric being named Trelane, who uses his apparently unlimited power over matter and form to manipulate the crew.
18	18	"Arena"	Joseph Pevney	Story by : Fredric Brown; Teleplay by : Gene L. Coon	January 19, 1967	19	10.54
The Enterprise comes under attack by unknown aliens while investigating the near-destruction of the Cestus III colony. While chasing the aliens into unexplored space, both ships are captured by the powerful Metrons, who force Kirk and the alien captain (later identified as a member of the Gorn race) to trial by combat; the winner's vessel will be set free, while the loser's ship will be destroyed.
19	19	"Tomorrow Is Yesterday"	Michael O'Herlihy	D. C. Fontana	January 26, 1967	21	10.98
After accidentally traveling back in time to 1969, the Enterprise rescues USAF Captain John Christopher from his crippled fighter jet. The crew struggles to return to their own time, while simultaneously returning Christopher to the Air Force, removing his knowledge of the future and all record of contact with the Enterprise.
20	20	"Court Martial"	Marc Daniels	Story by : Don M. Mankiewicz; Teleplay by : Don M. Mankiewicz and Steven W. Carabatsos	February 2, 1967	15	10.05
Captain Kirk is placed on trial for negligence after a crewman is killed during a severe ion storm. Kirk maintains that his actions were proper and consistent with standard procedure under the circumstances, but the evidence seems strong against him.
21	21	"The Return of the Archons"	Joseph Pevney	Story by : Gene Roddenberry; Teleplay by : Boris Sobelman	February 9, 1967	22	10.93
The Enterprise discovers a planetary population controlled by a powerful being called Landru. While investigating, Captain Kirk and his landing party are taken captive, and discover that the Enterprise crew will be the next to be "absorbed" into Landru's control.
22	22	"Space Seed"	Marc Daniels	Story by : Carey Wilber; Teleplay by : Gene L. Coon and Carey Wilber	February 16, 1967	24	9.94
The Enterprise discovers an ancient sleeper ship, the SS Botany Bay, which escaped from Earth's Eugenics Wars in the late 20th century. The genetically engineered passengers, led by war criminal Khan Noonien Singh, seize control of the Enterprise and attempt to destroy the ship. (This episode serves as the backstory to the second Star Trek film.)
23	23	"A Taste of Armageddon"	Joseph Pevney	Story by : Robert Hamner; Teleplay by : Robert Hamner and Gene L. Coon	February 23, 1967	23	10.98
On Eminiar VII, the Enterprise finds a civilization at war with its planetary neighbor. Unable to discern any signs of battle from orbit, Captain Kirk leads a landing party to the surface, where he discovers the entire war is fought by computer. Though the war is simulated, citizens who are listed as virtual casualties still report to termination booths to be killed for real. After the Enterprise is destroyed in an attack simulation, Kirk must fight to keep his crew from death.
24	24	"This Side of Paradise"	Ralph Senensky	Story by : Jerry Sohl (Note: Credited as Nathan Butler) and D. C. Fontana; Teleplay by : D. C. Fontana	March 2, 1967	25	10.10
Despite exposure to fatal radiation, the Federation colony on Omicron Ceti III appears to be thriving. A landing party from the Enterprise investigates, finding the colony's population to be healthy beyond explanation. Leila Kalomi, an old friend of Mr. Spock's, shows the landing party strange flowers that seem to impose a state of pure bliss and perfect health on all exposed to its spores (even Spock), but at the cost of ambition and self-discipline.
25	25	"The Devil in the Dark"	Joseph Pevney	Gene L. Coon	March 9, 1967	26	10.38
Dispatched to the mining colony on Janus VI, the Enterprise is to investigate rumors of a strange, subterranean creature responsible for destruction of equipment and the deaths of 50 miners. Kirk and Spock discover a silicon-based life form, a Horta, which lives in the surrounding rock. After Kirk and Spock find the strange creature, Spock performs a mind meld, discovering the reason behind the Horta's attacks.
26	26	"Errand of Mercy"	John Newland	Gene L. Coon	March 23, 1967	27	9.50
Peace negotiations have collapsed between the Federation and the warlike Klingon Empire. The Enterprise is ordered to protect Organia, a peaceful planet located near the Klingon border. Kirk and Spock beam to the surface to warn the Organians about the Klingons, but a Klingon fleet soon arrives, forcing the Enterprise to abandon the duo on the planet. The natives protect Kirk and Spock, even as Kor, the new Klingon governor, orders mass executions of the Organian people. As both Federation and Klingon fleets converge above the planet, Kirk and Spock execute a daring raid on the Klingon headquarters in an effort to destabilize their control over the planet.
27	27	"The Alternative Factor"	Gerd Oswald	Don Ingalls	March 30, 1967	20	9.33
While orbiting an apparently dead planet, the Enterprise seems to experience a strange moment of "nonexistence". Captain Kirk discovers a man named Lazarus on the planet below, who claims the effect was caused by his "enemy", later revealed to be an insane version of Lazarus from an alternate dimension. The sane version of Lazarus asks for Kirk's help in defeating his counterpart.
28	28	"The City on the Edge of Forever"	Joseph Pevney	Harlan Ellison	April 6, 1967	28	9.39
After accidentally overdosing on a powerful stimulant, Dr. McCoy becomes unbalanced and disappears through the Guardian of Forever, a newly discovered time portal on a remote planet. Kirk and Spock follow after learning that McCoy somehow changed history, removing everything they once knew, including the Enterprise. Arriving in the 1930s, the duo meets Edith Keeler, a New York social worker, who gives them a place to stay. As the days pass, and McCoy is nowhere to be seen, Kirk finds himself falling in love with Keeler, but Spock discovers that Keeler must die to restore the timeline. In 1997, TV Guide ranked this "Hugo Award"-winning episode number 92 on its list of the 100 Greatest Episodes. In 2009, it moved to #80.
29	29	"Operation – Annihilate!"	Herschel Daugherty	Steven W. Carabatsos	April 13, 1967	29	9.72
The Enterprise arrives at Deneva - the home of Captain Kirk's brother, Sam, and his family - and discovers that the entire planet has been infested with large, amoeba-like aliens that have attacked and killed much of the human population. One of these aliens attaches itself to Spock, who volunteers to become a subject in Dr. McCoy's medical tests. McCoy and Kirk find a cure in time to save Spock and the remainder of the Denevan population.

== Home media ==
In early 1980, Paramount Home Video issued a limited series of VHS tapes with two episodes per volume, pursuant to the theatrical release of Star Trek: The Motion Picture, with a selling price of $79.99 per volume.

Beginning in March 1981, a handful of season-one episodes debuted on CED. With the release of Star Trek II: The Wrath of Khan in theatres in June 1982, Paramount Home Video took a gamble on releasing the season-one episode "Space Seed" (along with a handful of theatrical titles) on public sale for a reduced price of $29.99, at a time when videotape titles typically sold for around $80. The move put the episode into the top sales position for the remainder of the year (helping to establish the “sell-thru” retail market), and into 1983, when Star Trek II went on public sale for $39.95. A complete set of season-one episodes debuted from 1985 through 1989 on laserdisc, VHS, and Betamax formats, typically with two episodes per volume (“The Menagerie”, Parts 1 and 2 appeared the year prior on laserdisc). Columbia House began issuing mail-order volumes featuring episodes in "star date" order in 1986.

The original series pilot, "The Cage", was released to home video in 1986, consisting of black-and-white workprint footage combined with color footage from the season-one, two-part episode "The Menagerie" with a run time of 73 minutes. In 1988, the excised color footage was found and the full-color version of the episode debuted on television and was later given a home-video release for the first time, with a shorter run time of 64 minutes.

Beginning in August 1999, season-one episodes debuted on DVD, with two episodes per volume, completing the entire series, including both versions of "The Cage", in November 1991. A complete-season box set with new bonus features, but without either version of the pilot, was released in August 2004.

Season one was released on the HD-DVD format as a 10-disc set in late 2007. The set included the series with remastered effects on hybrid DVD/HD-DVD combo discs, which play in DVD players at standard definition, but also on appropriate HD-DVD players. HD-DVD was overall discontinued, so only season one was released on HD-DVD, although the later two seasons were still released as remastered DVD versions. By purchasing a HD-DVD player and a remastered HD-DVD Star Trek season one, buyers of this special promotion could acquire a remote control shaped like Star Trek original-series phaser prop. Toshiba had partnered with Paramount to release the original series in remastered format, to support its then-new HD-DVD optical video disc format.

The Star Trek: Beyond the Final Frontier documentary was included with the season-one HD DVD box set of Star Trek: The Original Series. However, the documentary was included in the DVD component of the set, not the HD portion.

The first season, with remastered effects, debuted on Blu-ray on April 28, 2009. On September 6, 2016, it was re-released as part of the Star Trek 50th Anniversary set, which included the three seasons of the original series, original-cast films up to Star Trek VI, and the 1970s animated series on Blu-Ray optical discs.

== Reception ==
In 2019, CBR rated season one of Star Trek (1966–1969 series) as the 10th-best season of all Star Trek seasons up to that time, comparing it to seasons of later series.
