= The Corbomite Maneuver =

10th episode of the first season of Star Trek: The Original Series

- Star Trek: The Original Series episode
- The Fesarius An editor has nominated the above file for discussion of its purpose and/or potential deletion. You are welcome to participate in the discussion and help reach a consensus.
- Episode no.: Season 1 Episode 10
- Directed by: Joseph Sargent
- Written by: Jerry Sohl
- Cinematography by: Jerry Finnerman
- Production code: 003
- Original air date: November 10, 1966

Guest appearances
- Clint Howard – Balok; Anthony Call – Lt. Bailey; Walker Edmiston – Voice of Balok; Ted Cassidy – Voice of Balok Puppet; Eddie Paskey – Lt. Leslie; Bill Blackburn – Lt. Hadley; Frank da Vinci – Crewman; Ron Veto – Crewman; Sean Morgan – Crewman; Mittie Lawrence – Crew Woman; Ena Hartman – Crew Woman No. 2; Gloria Calomee – Crew Woman; Bruce Mars – Crewman No. 1; John Gabriel – Crewman

Episode chronology
← Previous "Dagger of the Mind"	Next → "The Menagerie"
- Star Trek: The Original Series season 1

"The Corbomite Maneuver" is the tenth episode of the first season of the American science fiction television series Star Trek. Written by Jerry Sohl and directed by Joseph Sargent, it first aired on November 10, 1966. In the episode, the Enterprise encounters a massive and powerful alien starship and its unusual commander. The episode has been well-received and frequently appears on lists of the best episodes in the series.

== Casting ==
The episode features a then 7-year-old Clint Howard – brother of actor and director Ron Howard – who plays the alien at the end (with an overdubbed voice provided by Walker Edmiston).

This was the first regular episode produced after the two pilots and the first to include DeForest Kelley as Dr. Leonard McCoy, Nichelle Nichols as Lt. Uhura (in a yellow uniform rather than red) and Grace Lee Whitney as Yeoman Rand. Because episodes were not aired in production order (a trait throughout the entire run of the original series), audiences had already been introduced to these three nine weeks earlier, in the series' debut episode, "The Man Trap".

== Plot ==
The USS Enterprise, commanded by Captain James T. Kirk, finishes a third day of star mapping when novice navigator Lt. Dave Bailey spots a large multi-colored cube spinning in space. He advocates attacking it with phasers. Kirk instead orders the ship to back away. The cube pursues them, emitting harmful radiation, and Kirk reluctantly destroys it.

A gigantic sphere approaches the Enterprise, which Bailey notes that even at a distance of "5,000 meters" (5 km) fills the screen; Spock describes it as a "mile" in diameter (1,600 m or 1.6 km). The Enterprise hails the vessel, and Commander Balok answers: he identifies the sphere as the Fesarius, the flagship of the "First Federation". The destroyed cube was a border marker. Balok announces that he will destroy the Enterprise for trespassing into First Federation territory and destroying the marker. He gives the crew ten minutes to pray to their deities.

First Officer Spock obtains a visual of Balok, who appears to be a blue-skinned humanoid with constantly shifting facial features. Bailey becomes hysterical, and Kirk relieves him. Dr. McCoy argues that Bailey's outburst was a result of Kirk putting too much pressure on him, and noting that he warned Kirk of Bailey's condition. The argument inspires Kirk to try bluffing Balok. He tells Balok that the Enterprise contains "corbomite", a substance that destroys any attacker, and claims little regard for the fact that the Enterprise would also be destroyed. When Bailey learns with the rest of the crew about their potentially impending doom, he contritely asks to resume his duties, which Kirk grants.

After ten minutes pass, Balok says that the destruction of the Enterprise has been delayed, and demands proof of corbomite's existence. When Kirk refuses, Balok states after another interval that the crew will be interned on an Earth-like planet and the Enterprise then destroyed. A small tug ship detaches from the Fesarius and starts towing the Enterprise deep into First Federation space. Intuiting that the tug ship's tractor beam cannot be as powerful as that of the Fesarius, Kirk orders the Enterprise to engage the engines at right angles to their course. Just as its engines are about to overload, the Enterprise breaks free. This apparently disables the alien vessel; the crew picks up a distress call which its mother ship does not answer, and which Uhura estimates would be too weak for them to hear anyway.

Kirk, McCoy, and Bailey form a boarding party to render assistance, leaving Spock on the Enterprise as a safeguard. They beam over, discovering that the "Balok" on their monitor was an effigy. The real Balok, looking like a hyperintelligent human child, welcomes them aboard. He was testing the Enterprise and its crew to discover their intentions. Balok expresses a desire to learn more about human culture, and suggests allowing a member of their crew to remain on his ship as an emissary of the Federation. Bailey volunteers, and Balok gives the officers a tour of his ship.

== Production ==
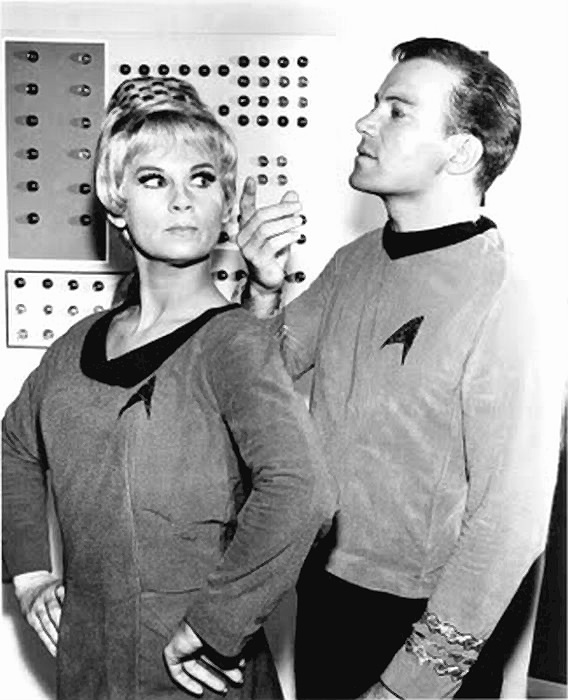
Yeoman Rand and Captain Kirk.

The episode was the first episode of the regular series to be produced, after the two pilots, "The Cage" and "Where No Man Has Gone Before", which had been made in 1964 and 1965. It was shot at a different stage, in Hollywood. Sets were transferred from Desilu's Culver City location, where later in the series a new engine room set would be constructed for a following episode ("The Enemy Within", production 005). Shooting started on May 24, 1966. The episode was held back until November due to the number of special effects scenes that were not completed, becoming the 10th episode to be broadcast. NBC preferred planet-based stories which were ready to air before "The Corbomite Maneuver" because the miniature footage was not completed or ready when the series premiered.

== Reception ==
In 2009, Zack Handlen of The A.V. Club gave the episode an "A" rating, describing it as "TOS [The Original Series] at its best—gripping, well-paced, and thematically coherent", and noting the ending's note of optimism.

In 2010, SciFiNow ranked this the sixth-best episode of the original series.

In 2014, Io9 rated it the 14th best of all Star Trek episodes.

In 2015, WIRED magazine labeled this as an "Episode You Can’t Skip" in their binge-watching guide for the original series.

In 2016, The Hollywood Reporter rated "The Corbomite Maneuver" the 45th best television episode of all Star Trek franchise television prior to Star Trek: Discovery, including live-action and the animated series but not counting the films.

In 2016, in a separate article by the same authors, The Hollywood Reporter ranked this episode as the 16th greatest episode looking at just the original series (TOS).

In 2017, Business Insider ranked "The Corbomite Maneuver" the 8th best episode of the original series.

In 2017, Den of Geek praised this episode as one of the "most thoughtful episodes of the entire franchise", noting how it set the trend for bizarre first contact situations.

In 2018, PopMatters ranked this the 9th best episode of the original series.

In 2018, as an adult, Howard was very impressed with the acting opportunities in the franchise, having appeared multiple times in other Star Trek series: "Oh, sure. I'm an actor and I love gainful employment. Virtually every job offer gets a legitimate consideration from me, but the fact that it's Star Trek is a yes at the drop of a hat. How many people have been on shows 50 years ago and are still being asked to be in incarnations of the same franchise?" When auditioning for George Lucas, the filmmaker immediately cited Howard's role as Balok years earlier, amazing the actor.

In 2018, Collider ranked this the 19th best episode of the original television series.

In 2019, Nerdist included this episode on their "Best of Kirk" binge-watching guide.

In 2021, Den of Geek ranked this the number three episode of the original series, remarking: "Like a good bottle of tranya, this episode only improves with time."

== Parodies ==
- In the Comedy Central Roast of William Shatner that first aired on August 20, 2006, Clint Howard reprised his role as Balok in a pre-recorded segment, depicting him as an alcoholic hooked on tranya, the beverage that Balok shared with Kirk at the end of the original Star Trek episode.
- At the Rally to Restore Sanity and/or Fear on October 30, 2010, Jon Stewart used the imaginary threat of "corbomite" in bottled water to illustrate how media figures (personified by Stephen Colbert) create and magnify fears in the public.

== See also ==
- "The Deadly Years"—A season two episode in which Kirk reuses the corbomite bluff to escape the Romulans
