= Barbara Baldavin =

American actress (1938–2024)

- Baldavin in Star Trek
- Born: Barbara J. Baldavin; October 18, 1938; Quincy, Massachusetts, U.S.
- Died: March 31, 2024 (aged 85); Manhattan Beach, California, U.S.
- Occupation: Television actress
- Years active: 1964–2000
- Television: Star Trek
- Spouse: Joseph D'Agosta

Barbara Baldavin (October 18, 1938 – March 31, 2024) was an American television and film actress.

== Career ==
Baldavin mainly performed in dramatic roles. In the late 1960s, she played a small recurring part in Star Trek as Angela Martine, in season 1 episodes "Balance of Terror" and "Shore Leave". Baldavin appeared in the series finale, "Turnabout Intruder", as Lt. Lisa, a communications officer and court reporter.

In a season 1 episode of Adam 12, Baldavin played Betty Wells, the wife of Officer Ed Wells (Gary Crosby); in a season 2 episode, she played Sally Fisher, a nurse and girlfriend of Pete Malloy (Martin Milner). In the 1970s, Baldavin was a regular cast member in Medical Center as Nurse Holmby. In 1971, she appeared in a season 5 episode of Mannix, "To Save a Dead Man", as Mrs Kilgore.

Baldavin went on to become a casting assistant, and then the casting director, for Trapper John, M.D. and Dynasty. In September 2010, she was shown as a member of the faculty at Dawn Wells' Film Actor's Boot Camp.

== Personal life and death ==
Baldavin was married to Joseph D'Agosta, whom she met when she appeared on the original Star Trek series, where he was a casting director.

Baldavin died of congestive heart failure at her home in Manhattan Beach, California, on March 31, 2024, at the age of 85.

== Filmography ==
Year	Title	Role	Notes
1964	Rawhide	Daughter	Season 7 Episode 12: "No Dogs or Drovers"
1965–1967	The Fugitive	Mickey / Nancy (uncredited)	2 episodes
1965–1973	The F.B.I.	Mrs. Harron / Receptionist / Stewardess / Nurse Shannon / Nora Selwyn	5 episodes
1966–1969	Star Trek	(1) (2) Angela (3) Communications Officer	(1) Episode: "Balance of Terror" (2) Episode: "Shore Leave" (3) Episode: "Turnabout Intruder"
1967	The Felony Squad	Girl	Season 1 Episode 23: "The Desperate Silence"
1967	Insight	Laura / Nancy	2 episodes
1968–1969	Adam-12	Mother / Betty Wells / Sally Fisher	3 episodes
1968–1971	Mannix	Arleen Cade / Kay Kilgore (Imposter)	2 episodes
1969–1976	Medical Center	Norma Summers / Nurse Holmby	59 episodes
1971	Wild Rovers	(uncredited)	
1971	Columbo	Brimmer's Secretary	Season 1 Episode 2: "Death Lends a Hand"
1971	What's a Nice Girl like You...?	Nurse	TV Movie
1972	Women in Chains	Ginger	TV Movie
1972	The New Healers	Mrs. Spencer	TV Movie
1973	Toma	Nurse	Season 1 Episode 8: "The Bambara Bust"
1974	McMillan & Wife	1st Stewardess	Season 3 Episode 4: "The Man Without a Face"
1974	Houston, We've Got a Problem	Donna Matthews	TV Movie
1974	The Wide World of Mystery	Waitress	Season 2 Episode 22: "Death Is a Bad Trip"
1974	Hangup	Beverly	
1974	Airport 1975	Passenger (uncredited)	
1975	A Cry for Help	The Woman	TV Movie
1975	Bronk	Joan Nelson	Season 1 Episode 0: "Pilot"
1975	Baretta	April	Season 2 Episode 1: "The Goodbye Orphan Annie Blues"
1976	The November Plan	Nancy	TV Movie
1976	City of Angels	Nancy (uncredited)	Season 1 Episode 1: "The November Plan: Part 1"
1976	Executive Suite	Penny	Season 1 Episode 10: "Re: The Sounds of Silence"
1976	Barnaby Jones	Nurse Alison Claymore	Season 5 Episode 8: "The Bounty Hunter"
1978	Charlie's Angels	Waitress	Season 2 Episode 15: "Hours of Desperation"
1978	The Bionic Woman	The Nurse	Season 3 Episode 19: "Out of Body"
1978	Fantasy Island	Selma Block	Season 1 Episode 14: "King for a Day/Instant Family"
1978	The Fisher Family	Linda	Episode: "The Cup"
1979	Quincy M.E.	Mrs. Roselli	Season 4 Episode 21: "An Ounce of Prevention"
1979	Marciano	Nurse	TV Movie
1979–1980	Vega$	Mrs. Stein / Susan Klein	2 episodes
1993	Skeeter	Dorothy O'Connell	

=== Casting ===
- 1962: Father of the Bride - casting director, 3 episodes
- 1981–1982: Strike Force - casting associate, 3 episodes
- 1981–1984: Trapper John, M.D. - casting associate, 62 episodes
- 1981–1984: Dynasty - casting assistant, 73 episodes
- 1982–1983: Matt Houston - casting associate, 23 episodes
- 1984–1985: Finder of Lost Loves - casting director, 22 episodes
- 1984–1986: Trapper John, M.D. - casting director, 38 episodes
- 1990: Satan's Princess - casting director, feature film
- 1998: Fallen Arches - casting director, feature film
