= Bruce Mars =

Monk (born 1935)

- Born: October 23, 1935 (age 90); New York City, New York, U.S.
- Other names: Brother Paramananda
- Occupation(s): actor, Monk of the Self-Realization Fellowship
- Years active: 1965–1969
- Known for: Star Trek episode "Shore Leave" as Finnegan

Bruce Mars (born October 23, 1935), also known as Brother Paramananda, is a monk of the Self-Realization Fellowship in Los Angeles, California, and a former actor.

== Acting career ==
After working on some off-Broadway productions in New York City, Mars moved to Los Angeles to pursue his acting career. In Hollywood, he had a short but energetic role as the Dancing Trooper opposite top-billed Ann-Margret in the movie Stagecoach (1966). His television career was more extensive. He gained a guest role on Rawhide, where he met casting director Joe D'Agosta. Mars later contacted D'Agosta after the casting director moved on to work on Star Trek, and was brought in to audition for the role of Junior Navigations Officer Dave Bailey in episode "The Corbomite Maneuver", alongside five other actors. Anthony Call was cast instead, but Mars also appeared in the background as Crewman #1. D'Agosta considered Mars a more substantial role and when casting was underway for "Shore Leave", he suggested to Mars that he audition for the part of Finnegan. Mars later said he felt like he had "nailed this baby" and was offered the role in person. Based on this success, he was brought back for a third time to play a 20th-century police officer in the episode "Assignment: Earth".

Outside of Star Trek, he appeared in the Voyage to the Bottom of the Sea episodes "Killers of the Deep" and "The Abominable Snowman".

== Religious career ==
Mars left the acting profession to become a monk with the Self-Realization Fellowship in Los Angeles and eventually took the name Brother Paramananda. He told about his spiritual awakening in an interview with the Los Angeles Times in 2004: "The words 'karma' and 'reincarnation' are being thrown around everywhere, even in sports - at some TV basketball game, a guy tried a shot and couldn't make it, and the radio announcer said it was his karma. I went the whole hog and became a monk and walked away. Nowadays people don't have to run away to meditate. There are doctors, lawyers, a mother with three children - anyone can do it. There's more acceptance." During his time at the Fellowship, he conversed with Elvis Presley on several occasions, who on one occasion said to Paramananda, "Man, you made the right choice. People don't know my life or that I sometimes cry myself to sleep because I don't know God."

== Filmography ==
Year	Title	Role	Notes
1966	Stagecoach	Dancing Trooper	
1966–1968	Voyage to the Bottom of the Sea	Various	2 episodes
1966–1968	Star Trek	Various	3 episodes
1967	The Lucy Show	Sonny	Season 5, Episode 20; "Lucy the Fight Manager"
1968	Maryjane	Toby	
