= The Galileo Seven =

- Star Trek: The Original Series episode
- Episode no.: Season 1 Episode 16
- Directed by: Robert Gist
- Story by: Oliver Crawford
- Teleplay by: Oliver Crawford; S. Bar-David
- Cinematography by: Jerry Finnerman
- Production code: 014
- Original air date: January 5, 1967

Guest appearances
- Don Marshall – Lt. Boma; John Crawford – Commissioner Ferris; Peter Marko – Lt. Gaetano; Phyllis Douglas – Yeoman Mears; Rees Vaughn – Lt. Latimer; Grant Woods – Lt. Kelowitz; Buck Maffei – Creature; David Ross – Transporter Chief

Episode chronology
← Previous "Shore Leave"	Next → "The Squire of Gothos"
- Star Trek: The Original Series season 1

"The Galileo Seven" is the sixteenth episode of the first season of the American science fiction television series Star Trek. Written by Oliver Crawford and directed by Robert Gist, it first aired on January 5, 1967. It was inspired by the 1939 film Five Came Back.

In the episode, First Officer Spock leads a scientific team from the Enterprise aboard the shuttlecraft Galileo on an ill-fated mission, facing tough decisions when the shuttle crashes on a planet populated by aggressive giants.

== Plot ==
The USS Enterprise, under the command of Captain Kirk, is en route to Makus III to deliver medical supplies destined for the New Paris Colony. The ship passes close to a quasar-like formation identified as Murasaki 312, which Kirk's standing orders require him to study. Kirk sends a science team composed of Science Officer Spock, Chief Medical Officer Dr. McCoy, Chief Engineer Scott, Yeoman Mears, and three other specialists (Latimer, Gaetano, and Boma) in the shuttlecraft, Galileo, to investigate the formation. Soon after launch, the shuttle is pulled off course. Spock makes an emergency landing on the planet Taurus II, a rocky, fog-shrouded world in the middle of the Murasaki phenomenon.

Crewmembers Latimer and Gaetano scout the area, eventually encountering Taurus II's native inhabitants: giant ape-like creatures armed with enormous spears and shields. Latimer is killed by a spear, and Gaetano drives off the creatures with phaser fire. The crew retreat to the Galileo, only to discover that the creatures seem to be preparing for an organized attack. Despite objections from the others, Spock chooses to attempt to frighten the creatures rather than killing them outright. This proves to be a miscalculation, and Gaetano is killed.

Meanwhile, Kirk searches for the shuttle, despite concerns from Commissioner Ferris, who is impatient to start for Makus III. Because of sensor interference, the shuttlecraft Columbus is dispatched to search the planet from orbit, and search parties are transported to the surface. One of the landing parties returns with casualties and reports being attacked by the large, furry creatures.

Between boulder-throwing attacks by the primitive giants and quarrels amongst themselves, the crew attempt to make repairs on the shuttle. As most of their conventional fuel has been lost, Mr. Scott adapts the landing party's phasers to power the ship. His repairs are eventually successful, but Boma will not leave without giving Gaetano and Latimer a proper burial. When Spock advises against it, Boma becomes insubordinate, to which Spock responds by allowing him the funeral. During the ceremony, the creatures attack again, and Spock is pinned by a boulder. Despite Spock's orders to leave him, McCoy and Boma free him. Spock then manages to get the Galileo off the ground by using the shuttle's boosters. As a result, the shuttle now has too little fuel to escape the planet's gravity or even to achieve a stable orbit, and there is still no way to contact the Enterprise. Spock suddenly decides to dump and ignite all the remaining fuel from the shuttle's engines. The giant flare he produces is seen on the Enterprise view screen just as the ship has left orbit. Kirk reverses course, and the survivors are beamed out just as the shuttle is destroyed on re-entry.

Back on board the Enterprise, Kirk questions Spock, trying to get him to admit that his final action was motivated more by emotion than logic. Spock refuses but freely admits to stubbornness, at which the rest of the crew burst into laughter.

== Production ==
The episode was inspired by the 1939 film Five Came Back, wherein a plane with twelve people on board crashes in a jungle filled with hostile natives, and the title openly proclaims that not everyone will make it out of the scenario.

The part of Yeoman Mears was originally intended to be taken by Janice Rand, but the script was adjusted to be a new character after actress Grace Lee Whitney had issues with substance abuse that resulted in her not being cast in episodes.

== Legacy ==
This episode is an early progenitor of a common plot beat across the Star Trek franchise – some obstinate, meddling bureaucrat shows up and gets into a conflict with the captain. Keith R. A. DeCandido also writes that the episode is a good example that the way Kirk was written in The Original Series does not quite match the later cultural view of his character as a maverick rule-breaker. While older Kirk does indeed break the rules (most notably in Star Trek III: The Search for Spock), in the television show he was substantially more deferential to them. In "The Galileo Seven", Kirk puts a colony in need of medical supplies at risk solely on the justification that he has orders from Starfleet to promptly investigate such quasars, and those come before acting as a freighter for a humanitarian mission.

== Reception ==
Zack Handlen of The A.V. Club gave the episode a 'B' rating, noting that it "raises some interesting issues" but described it overall as watching a "fixed fight".

A 2015 retrospective by Keith R. A. DeCandido was ambivalent and ranked the episode a 5/10. DeCandido thought the episode was a good vehicle for Spock and his inner conflicts between his Vulcan and human nature. However, he thought that the overall scenario was handled awkwardly, with the narrative seemingly portraying Ferris and Spock's Vulcan side as the ones in error despite the situation seeming to back them up as actually being correct, yet not giving them a chance for a proper "I told you so."

The Hollywood Reporter ranked "The Galileo Seven" as the 67th best episode across the Star Trek franchise in 2016. They also ranked this episode as the 19th best episode of the original series. A 2016 list published by Business Insider ranked "The Galileo Seven" the 9th-best episode of the original series.

io9 published a list of the top 100 Star Trek episodes in 2014 that placed "The Galileo Seven" as the 36th best episode of the franchise at the time.

In 2015, SyFy ranked this episode as one of the top ten essential Star Trek original series Spock episodes.

In 2018, Collider ranked this episode the 15th-best original series episode.

In 2018, PopMatters ranked this the 17th-best episode of the original series.
