= Shore Leave (Star Trek: The Original Series) =

- Star Trek: The Original Series episode
- Episode no.: Season 1 Episode 15
- Directed by: Robert Sparr
- Written by: Theodore Sturgeon
- Cinematography by: Jerry Finnerman
- Production code: 017
- Original air date: December 29, 1966

Guest appearances
- Marcia Brown – Alice; Emily Banks – Yeoman Tonia Barrows; Oliver McGowan – The Caretaker; Perry Lopez – Esteban Rodriguez; Barbara Baldavin – Lt. Angela Martine; Bruce Mars – Finnegan; Shirley Bonne – Ruth; Sebastian Tom – The Warrior

Episode chronology
← Previous "Balance of Terror"	Next → "The Galileo Seven"
- Star Trek: The Original Series season 1

"Shore Leave" is the fifteenth episode of the first season of the American science fiction television series Star Trek. Written by Theodore Sturgeon and directed by Robert Sparr, it first aired on December 29, 1966.

In the episode, the crew of the Enterprise visits a bizarre planet where the fantasies of the landing party become reality.

== Plot ==
The USS Enterprise arrives at a planet in the Omicron Delta system. Scans reveal the planet is congenial, but that there is no animal or insect life of any sort. The crew is exhausted after three months of operations, so Captain Kirk announces shore leave for off-duty personnel, but first he orders survey parties to scout the planet.

Dr. McCoy and Lt. Sulu form one survey party. They find a truly beautiful and peaceful planet. McCoy calls Kirk to report that he had just seen an anthropomorphic white rabbit, and that a moment later Alice, from Alice in Wonderland, appeared and asked McCoy if a rabbit had passed by. Kirk disbelieves this, thinking that McCoy is trying to get Kirk to also take shore leave, which Kirk had said he didn't need. Science Officer Spock persuades Kirk to beam down by pointing out that his physical fitness report shows that his performance has deteriorated.

After Kirk and his yeoman, Tonia Barrows, beam down, McCoy shows Kirk the tracks of a large rabbit. Elsewhere, Sulu finds and fires a Colt Police Positive revolver. Then Yeoman Barrows reports that she was attacked by Don Juan; her uniform is torn. Kirk is briefly accosted by Finnegan, a cocky practical joker who tormented Kirk during his Academy days, and meets Ruth, a former girlfriend. Sulu is attacked by a katana-wielding samurai, and reports his phaser didn't work. Kirk also finds his phaser isn't working. Kirk orders a halt to the shore leave before any personnel have been beamed down. Spock reports the planet is emanating a force field that is drawing energy from the ship's engines and disrupting communications. The energy patterns suggest industrial activity.

Spock beams down to gather sensor readings as communications between the ship and planet degrade, stranding Spock with Kirk and the survey parties on the planet with no means of communicating with the ship. After McCoy asks Yeoman Barrows to change into a medieval dress, a knight on horseback charges them. McCoy protects her but is impaled by the lance and killed. Kirk shoots the knight with Sulu's revolver. Kirk and Spock analyze the knight's body; it is composed of the same material as the planet's vegetation. A World War II fighter plane strafes the landing party; during the commotion, the bodies of Dr. McCoy and the knight vanish.

Spock asks Kirk what was on his mind before his "vision" of Finnegan. Kirk says he was thinking of his academy days. As Spock expects, Finnegan reappears. Finnegan taunts the Captain before running off, with Kirk chasing him. They have a fistfight and Kirk knocks out Finnegan, which Kirk says that he has always wanted to do. Spock and Kirk realize that their thoughts are causing their fantastic experiences, but also that the experiences are increasingly deadly. Kirk orders everyone to stop thinking, about anything.

An elderly man appears: the "Caretaker", who explains that "[t]he planet is an 'amusement park'"; its constructs are not intended to be harmful or permanent. Accompanying him is Dr. McCoy, revived by the planet. McCoy shows off the two Rigelian cabaret girls he thought of after being revived. The Caretaker apologizes for the misunderstandings and offers the planet's services to the Enterprise's crew, cautioning that they must choose their amusements carefully. Kirk accepts the offer as Ruth reappears, and authorizes the crew to beam down.

== Production ==
Gene Roddenberry had been running flat out for two years without a break, first producing The Lieutenant, then selling Star Trek to NBC, and finally getting the series into production. Just after "Shore Leave" was approved for preproduction, his wife and doctor insisted that he take a vacation.

The script turned in by science fiction writer Theodore Sturgeon had emphasized the importance of fantasy as a component of relaxation, and the network was concerned that the script might be too surreal. Roddenberry assured the network that the script would be rewritten and the fantasy would be de-emphasized before he went on vacation. However, this was not made clear to incoming operational producer Gene L. Coon, who did the rewrite and emphasized the fantasy aspect even more. Roddenberry returned the day before shooting was due to begin and realized he had a problem. Sturgeon particularly objected to McCoy's bringing back two women to the ship, believing it undermined the emotional tension between McCoy and Tonia.

The location shooting that makes up 90% of the episode took place at Africa USA, an animal training preserve where the television series Cowboy in Africa and Daktari often filmed. Star Trek lore says that Roddenberry set up a table, a chair, and a typewriter under a tree, frantically rewriting Coon's revised script, trying to stay ahead of the shooting schedule while maintaining some sort of continuity. This caused a few problems.

Even with Roddenberry's rewriting, many of Coon's and Sturgeon's fantasy aspects remained, from an encounter with a samurai, to meeting a tiger (though the idea of Kirk wrestling the tiger was deleted, initially to the annoyance, but later to the relief, of William Shatner), and a scene using an elephant was cut before filming. Gregg Peters, newly promoted to the rank of assistant director, had been detailed to take care of the elephant. During the shoot, the cast and crew teased him about the pachyderm, asking when it would be used. For many years thereafter, when Peters attended Star Trek conventions, the fans would greet him with a chorus of, "Say, Gregg, when do you get to use your elephant?"

== Reception ==
Zack Handlen of The A.V. Club gave the episode an 'A−' rating, describing the episode as "a lot of fun" and noting "a strong hook to keep the camp from descending into self-parody."

In 2016, Hollywood Reporter rated "Shore Leave" the 82nd best episode of all Star Trek episodes.

In 2018, PopMatters ranked this the 14th best episode of the original series.

== Revisit ==
The animated Star Trek episode "Once Upon a Planet", written by Filmation staff writers Leonard "Len" Janson and Charles "Chuck" Menville, involves the Enterprise returning to the amusement park planet for another rest. However, the Caretaker has died, and the computer left to run the planet, a fairly intelligent machine, now resents its role as servant and turns against visitors, using the props and personalities the visitors think about against them.
