= Paul Schneider (screenwriter) =

American novelist (1923–2008)

- Born: August 4, 1923; Passaic, New Jersey, US
- Died: October 13, 2008 (aged 85); Riverside, California, US
- Occupation: Television screenwriter
- Writing career
- Period: 1952 – 1989

Paul Schneider (August 4, 1923 – October 13, 2008) was an American screenwriter who worked in television and film between the 1950s and the 1980s.

== Star Trek ==
Schneider is probably best remembered for two episodes of the original Star Trek series: "Balance of Terror" and "The Squire of Gothos". The first of these introduced the Romulans – which became one of the main alien races in the Star Trek universe. The second episode introduces a "Q"-like lifeform which terrorizes the crew. He also wrote the episode "The Terratin Incident" for the animated Star Trek series.

== Filmography ==
Schneider wrote for several other films and television series, including Mr. Magoo, Bonanza, Ironside, The Six Million Dollar Man and Buck Rogers in the 25th Century.

=== Films ===
| Year | Movie | Credit | Notes |
|---|---|---|---|
| 1955 | The Looters | Story By | |
| 1959 | 1001 Arabian Nights | Written By | |
| 1966 | That Tennessee Beat | Written By | |
| 1972 | Lapin 360 | Written By | Based on his novel "Delia", Co-Wrote screenplay with "Herb Margolis". |
| 1989 | Options | Written By, Associate Producer | |

=== Television ===
| Year | TV Series | Credit | Notes |
|---|---|---|---|
| 1952 | The Dog Snatcher | Writer | Cartoon Short |
| 1953 | The Pride of the Family | Writer | Pilot Episode |
| 1954 | Kangaroo Courting | Writer | Cartoon Short |
| 1955 | The Eddie Cantor Comedy Theatre | Writer | 4 Episodes |
| 1957-58 | How to Marry a Millionaire | Writer | 5 Episodes |
| 1958-59 | The Ed Wynn Show | Writer | 2 Episodes |
| 1959 | The DuPont Show with June Allyson | Writer | 1 Episode |
| 1960 | Manhunt | Writer | 1 Episode |
| 1961-62 | Shannon | Writer | 2 Episodes |
| 1962 | Ben Casey | Writer | 1 Episode |
| 1962 | 77 Sunset Strip | Writer | 1 Episode |
| 1962 | Wide Country | Writer | 1 Episode |
| 1963-64 | Dr. Kildare | Writer | 2 Episodes |
| 1964 | Mr. Novak | Writer | 1 Episode |
| 1964 | The Lieutenant | Writer | 1 Episode |
| 1964 | Kraft Suspense Theatre | Writer | 1 Episode |
| 1965 | The Big Valley | Writer | 1 Episode |
| 1965-67 | Bonanza | Writer | 5 Episodes |
| 1966-67 | Star Trek | Writer | 2 Episodes |
| 1968 | The F.B.I. | Writer | 3 Episodes |
| 1969 | Ironside | Writer | 1 Episode |
| 1969-74 | Marcus Welby, M.D. | Writer | 11 Episodes |
| 1970-73 | The Mod Squad | Writer | 2 Episodes |
| 1972 | Owen Marshall, Counselor at Law | Writer | 1 Episode |
| 1973 | Star Trek: The Animated Series | Writer | 1 Episode |
| 1973 | The Starlost | Writer | 1 Episode |
| 1974-76 | The Six Million Dollar Man | Writer | 3 Episodes |
| 1975 | Swiss Family Robinson | Writer | 1 Episode |
| 1980 | Eight Is Enough | Writer | 1 Episode |
| 1981 | Buck Rogers in the 25th Century | Writer | 2 Episodes |
| 1982 | King's Crossing | Writer | 1 Episode |
