= Balance of Terror =

- Star Trek: The Original Series episode
- Episode no.: Season 1 Episode 14
- Directed by: Vincent McEveety
- Written by: Paul Schneider
- Cinematography by: Jerry Finnerman
- Production code: 009
- Original air date: December 15, 1966

Guest appearances
- Mark Lenard – Romulan Commander; Paul Comi – Lt. Stiles; Lawrence Montaigne – Decius; John Warburton – Centurion; Stephen Mines – Lt. Robert Tomlinson; Barbara Baldavin – Lt. Angela Martine; Garry Walberg – Hansen; John Arndt – Fields; Robert Chadwick – Romulan Scanner Operator

Episode chronology
← Previous "The Conscience of the King"	Next → "Shore Leave"
- Star Trek: The Original Series season 1

"Balance of Terror" is the fourteenth episode of the first season of the American science fiction television series Star Trek. Written by Paul Schneider and directed by Vincent McEveety, it first aired on December 15, 1966.

The series, which was later subtitled The Original Series, follows the adventures of the starship USS Enterprise (NCC-1701) and its crew led by Captain James T. Kirk (portrayed by William Shatner) through the galaxy. The episode follows a strategy-filled battle between the Enterprise and a Romulan ship that has methodically destroyed Federation outposts bordering the Neutral Zone.

"Balance of Terror" notably introduces both the Romulan species and the cloaking device. Mark Lenard, who plays the unnamed Romulan commander, later portrayed Spock's father Sarek in the majority of his later Star Trek appearances, as well as a Klingon captain in Star Trek: The Motion Picture. The episode's events are revisited within an alternate future in the Star Trek: Strange New Worlds episode "A Quality of Mercy" (2022).

== Plot ==
The USS Enterprise, under the command of Captain Kirk, is investigating a loss of communications with a line of Earth outposts near the Romulan Neutral Zone, formed under the terms of the peace treaty that ended the Earth–Romulan War a century earlier. Because there were no visual communications at that time, the two races have never seen each other.

While Kirk officiates at the wedding of Lieutenant Tomlinson and Ensign Martine, Outpost 4 comes under attack. The Enterprise races to Outpost 4's aid and contacts the base commander, Hansen, who reveals he is the only survivor of an attack by an unknown enemy. As they speak, the enemy ship reappears, fires, and disappears.

Though sheltered under a mile of iron on an asteroid, the outpost is destroyed, and Hansen killed.

The ship's sensors locate the attacker, which remains invisible. Kirk surmises that the attacker is equipped with a cloaking device. A coded message from the intruder provides a view through one of its internal cameras, revealing that the never-before-seen Romulans are humanoids similar in appearance to Vulcans. Lieutenant Stiles, the navigator, a descendant of a service family that lost several members in the Earth–Romulan War, begins to question the loyalty of the Enterprise's half-Vulcan first officer, Mr. Spock.

During a discussion of the Romulan ship's capabilities, Stiles suggests the Enterprise attack before it can reach the Neutral Zone. Spock agrees; he reasons that if the Romulans are in fact an offshoot of the Vulcan species and have retained the martial philosophy of the Vulcans' ancient past, they would surely take advantage of any perceived weakness.

A cat-and-mouse game ensues. The Enterprise is faster and more maneuverable, while the Romulan ship has a cloaking device and immensely destructive plasma torpedoes. However, the range of these torpedoes is limited, and firing one requires so much power that the ship must decloak first.

After several attacks, the Romulans, almost beaten, plant a nuclear weapon amidst jettisoned debris. When Spock detects a "metal-cased object", Kirk orders a point-blank phaser shot that detonates the device. The Enterprise is shaken by the blast and many of the phaser crew are incapacitated, requiring Stiles to fill in. Kirk orders operations to work at minimal power to exaggerate the apparent damage and lure the Romulans in for a kill shot. Although the Romulan commander suspects Kirk's trap, Decius, a politically well-connected member of the command crew, pressures him to attack. When the Romulan ship decloaks to launch a torpedo, Kirk tries to spring his trap, but a coolant leak in the phaser control room incapacitates Stiles and Tomlinson. Spock, whom Stiles had insulted as being unneeded in the phaser control room, returns to rescue Stiles and fires the phasers, critically damaging the Romulan ship.

Kirk hails the Romulans and at last communicates directly with his opponent, offering to beam aboard survivors. The Romulan commander tells Kirk that he regrets having met him in combat, that "You and I are of a kind. In a different reality, I could have called you friend." He declines Kirk's offer to take off his crew, telling the Captain that it is not the Romulan way to be taken prisoner. The Commander then triggers his ship's self-destruct system.

Enterprise's only fatality is Lt. Tomlinson. Kirk goes to the chapel to offer comfort to Tomlinson's grieving fiancée, Ensign Martine.

== Production ==
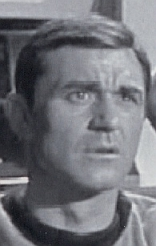
Paul Comi as Lt. Stiles

The Star Trek Compendium stated the episode was essentially a science fiction version of the submarine film The Enemy Below, depicting a cat-and-mouse game between the Enterprise as the American destroyer against a Romulan vessel as the German U-boat. Director Vincent McEveety had seen the 1957 film The Enemy Below but only noticed the similarities between its plot and this episode later. He admitted "Obviously, it's the same story."

The business of the Romulan Commander launching the body of the Centurion out the disposal tube in an attempt to convince Captain Kirk his Warbird has been destroyed is taken from the 1958 war movie Run Silent, Run Deep where Captain Richardson of the USS Nerka (Clark Gable) uses the same tactic for the same purpose.

The soundtrack cue "In the Chapel", played during the opening scene of the wedding ceremony, is an instrumental medley of the 19th century English song "Long, Long Ago" by Thomas Haynes Bayly and the "Bridal Chorus" by Richard Wagner.

The term photon torpedo was only invented for a later episode "Arena", but the same sound and visual effects were used for phaser-fire in this episode.

Although it was the 9th episode filmed, it's broadcast date came much later as the 14th episode shown on NBC because of all the post production work needed and all the special effects included in the episode.

On September 16, 2006, "Balance of Terror" became the first digitally remastered Star Trek episode, featuring enhanced and new visual effects, computer generated (CGI) spaceships, and high-definition format.

All core Star Trek regular background players appear in this episode: Eddie Paskey (Lt. Lesley and William Shatner stand-in), Frank da Vinci (Lt. Brent and Leonard Nimoy stand-in), William Blackburn (Lt. Hadley and De Forest Kelley stand-in), Ron Veto (Harrison), John Arndt (Fields) and Jeanne Malone (Enterprise yeoman and stand-in for Grace Lee Whitney).

== Reception ==
The episode is frequently praised by critics and regularly appears on lists of the best episodes of Star Trek. In 2016, The Washington Post ranked "Balance of Terror" the third-best episode of the entire Star Trek franchise, noting that it investigates the connection between wars and race, and that it shows both sides of a conflict in deep space. A 2017 article in The Washington Post which ranked the seven captains of Star Trek included a special mention of the captain of the Romulan vessel, calling him "The greatest alien captain". In 2016, Business Insider ranked "Balance of Terror" the best episode of The Original Series. In 2016, SyFy ranked guest star Mark Lenard (the Romulan captain) as the eighth-best guest star on The Original Series. In 2016, Empire ranked this the 43rd-best in a top 50 ranking of the 700 plus Star Trek television episodes. Critic Ed Gross praised the episode for exploring the theme of bigotry, and as "a piece of television that manages to conjure genuine suspense as one commander attempts to outmaneuvre the other".

== Legacy ==
Guest star Mark Lenard, who portrayed the Romulan commander, returned in the episode "Journey to Babel", in which he played Sarek, Spock's father. Lenard has the distinction of having played a Romulan, a Klingon and a Vulcan over the course of the Star Trek franchise, the only actor to have done so.

Bryan Fuller called the episode a "favorite" and a "touchstone" which influenced the creation of the story arc in Star Trek: Discovery.

The events of the episode are revisited in the Star Trek: Strange New Worlds episode "A Quality of Mercy", in which Christopher Pike (Anson Mount) sees an alternative future wherein he was not disabled and has retained command of the USS Enterprise. The differences between Pike and Kirk are highlighted; while Pike's preference for peace and mutual respect eventually gain the admiration of the Romulan commander, the peaceful attempt to negotiate with the Romulans, who see the gesture as an act of weakness and determine that the Federation is likewise weak, restarts open war with the Romulans, and it is ultimately alternate-future Kirk's brashness, cunning and luck that barely save the alternative Enterprise; his quality is implied to be what prevented open war with Romulans in the original timeline.

== Non-canonical works ==
Comic book publisher IDW Publishing released a prequel, Star Trek Alien Spotlight: Romulans and a sequel, Star Trek Romulans: The Hollow Crown. They are not part of the official Star Trek canon.
