= Oliver Crawford =

American screenwriter and author

- Born: August 12, 1917; Chicago, Illinois, United States
- Died: September 24, 2008 (aged 91); Los Angeles, California, United States
- Occupations: Screenwriter, author
- Spouse: Bert Pikus (1918-1986; her death)
- Children: 3

Oliver Crawford (August 12, 1917 – September 24, 2008) was an American screenwriter and author who overcame the Hollywood blacklist during the McCarthy Era of the 1950s to become one of the entertainment industry's most successful television writers, for shows including Star Trek, Bonanza, Quincy, M.E., Perry Mason, and the Kraft Television Theatre.

== Early life ==
Born in Chicago, Illinois, Crawford attended the Chicago Art Institute and the Goodman Theatre school. His classmates at Goodman included Sam Wanamaker and Karl Malden, both of whom became his lifelong friends.

== Career ==
Crawford began working in the television industry as a writer in the early 1950s. By 1953, he had contracted to work with both Harold Hecht and Burt Lancaster. Shortly after he signed his contract to work with Lancaster, Crawford was summoned in 1953 to appear before the House Un-American Activities Committee, which was investigating suspected Communist sympathizers in Hollywood. Crawford refused to name suspected Communists sympathizers within the entertainment industry. His refusal to implicate anyone in Hollywood led to his blacklisting. He was also fired from his 1953 contract. He moved to New York City with his family after being blacklisted where he was forced to take several jobs to make ends meet, including designing window displays.

Crawford was finally able to return to television in 1957 when a friend, actor Sam Levene, got him a job as a writer for Playhouse 90. His career took off during the 1960s, when he wrote for many shows including Gilligan's Island, The Fugitive, The Outer Limits, The Rifleman, The Big Valley, Rawhide, Ben Casey, Lawman, and I Spy. His credits during the 1970s included Love, American Style, The Bionic Woman, Kojak, Mannix, Ironside, and numerous other television shows.

Crawford authored a 1978 novel, The Execution, which explored survivors of a Nazi concentration camp who recognized a former Nazi doctor who had experimented on them and seek revenge. The novel was adapted into a 1985 television movie of the week, which starred Sandy Dennis, Loretta Swit, Rip Torn, Valerie Harper, Jessica Walter, and Barbara Barrie.

Crawford served on the board of directors of the Writers Guild of America for 26 years following the restoration of his screenwriting career. His position in the Writers Guild allowed him to advocate for financial restitution for victims of the Hollywood blacklist. Crawford also worked to successfully remove an anti-Communist loyalty oath from Writers Guild's membership application, which was a holdover from the Hollywood blacklist era.

For his work, Crawford received a Writers Guild award nomination for The Outer Limits. He was also a multiple Emmy Award nominated television writer, including for Lineup and Climax!. Crawford also lectured as an associate professor of filmmaking at Loyola Marymount University.

== Death ==
On September 24, 2008, Crawford died from complications from pneumonia in Los Angeles at the age of 91. He was survived by two daughters, Jo Kaufman and Vicki Crawford, one brother, and one sister. His wife, Bert (née Pikus) died in 1986. His son, Kenneth Kaufman died in March, 2015.

== Filmography ==
Film
Year	Title	Notes
1953	The Man from the Alamo	Story
1954	The Steel Cage	Segment: "The Hostages"
1958	Girl in the Woods	Story and screenplay
1985	The Execution	Television movie (screenplay)
Television
Year	Title	Notes
1951	The Stu Erwin Show	1 episode
1952	Boston Blackie	1 episode
1953	Terry and the Pirates	5 episodes
1955–1957	Kraft Television Theatre	2 episodes
1956–1958	Climax!	6 episodes
1957	Lux Video Theatre	1 episode
1958	The Restless Gun	1 episode
1958	U.S. Marshal	1 episode
1959	Armchair Theatre	1 episode
1959	The Third Man	1 episode
1959	Lawman	2 episodes
1959	Startime	1 episode
1959	Rawhide	3 episodes
1959	Man with a Camera	1 episode
1960–1967	Bonanza	2 episodes
1961	The Aquanauts	1 episode
1962	Perry Mason	1 episode
1962	Checkmate	1 episode
1962	The Rifleman	1 episode
1962–1965	Ben Casey	5 episodes
1963–1967	The Fugitive	3 episodes
1964	The Outer Limits	1 episode
1965	Gilligan's Island	1 episode
1965	The Big Valley	1 episode
1965	The Long Hot Summer	2 episodes
1965–1969	The Wild Wild West	2 episodes
1966	Tarzan	1 episode
1966	Voyage to the Bottom of the Sea	1 episode
1966–1967	The Iron Horse	2 episodes
1967	I Spy	1 episode
1967–1969	Star Trek	2 episodes
1968	Here Come the Brides	1 episode
1969	Land of the Giants	1 episode
1969–1970	Medical Center	3 episodes
1970	Love, American Style	1 episode
1970–1972	Mannix	2 episodes
1974	Petrocelli	1 episode
1974	Ironside	1 episode
1976	The Swiss Family Robinson	2 episodes
1976	The Blue Knight	1 episode
1976	Bronk	1 episode
1976	The Bionic Woman	3 episodes
1977	Kojak	1 episode
1978	Kaz	1 episode

== Awards ==
Year	Award	Result	Category	Notes
1983	Writers Guild of America Award	Won	Morgan Cox Award	-
1997	Writers Guild of America Award	Won	Morgan Cox Award	Shared with Katherine Coker, Philip D. Fehrle, D.C. Fontana, Michael A. Hoey, Rick Mittleman, and John Riley
