= List of Star Trek: The Original Series episodes =

Created by Gene Roddenberry, the science fiction television series Star Trek (which eventually acquired the retronym Star Trek: The Original Series) stars William Shatner as Captain James T. Kirk, Leonard Nimoy as Mr. Spock, and DeForest Kelley as Dr. Leonard "Bones" McCoy aboard the fictional Federation starship USS Enterprise. The series originally aired from September 1966 through June 1969 on NBC.

This is the first television series in the Star Trek franchise, and comprises 79 regular episodes over the series' three seasons, along with the series' original pilot episode, "The Cage". The episodes are listed in order by original air date, which match the episode order in each season's original, remastered, and Blu-ray DVD box sets. The original, single-disc DVD releases placed the episodes by production order, with "The Cage" on the final disc.

After the series' cancellation, Paramount Television released Star Trek to television stations as a syndication package, where the series' popularity grew to become a "major phenomenon within popular culture". This popularity would eventually lead to the expansion of the Star Trek catalog, which as of 2026 includes twelve more television series and thirteen Trek motion pictures.

In 2006, CBS Paramount Domestic Television (now CBS Television Distribution) announced that each Original Series episode would be re-syndicated in high definition after undergoing digital remastering, including both new and enhanced visual effects. (To date, the remastered episodes have only been broadcast in standard definition, though all three seasons are now available on the high-definition Blu-ray Disc format.) The remastered episodes began with "Balance of Terror" (along with, in some markets, "Miri") during the weekend of September 16, 2006, and ended with "The Cage", which aired during the weekend of May 2, 2009. The remastered air dates listed below are based on the weekend each episode aired in syndication.

== Series overview ==
Season	Episodes	Originally released	
Season	Episodes	First released	Last released
1	29	September 8, 1966	April 13, 1967
2	26	September 15, 1967	March 29, 1968
3	24	September 20, 1968	June 3, 1969

== Episodes ==
=== Pilots (1964–65) ===
Star Trek's pilot episode, "The Cage", was completed between November 1964 and January 1965, and starred Jeffrey Hunter as Captain Christopher Pike, Majel Barrett as Number One, and Leonard Nimoy as Spock. The pilot was rejected by NBC as being "too cerebral" among other complaints. Jeffrey Hunter chose to withdraw from the role of Pike when creator Gene Roddenberry was asked to produce a second pilot episode "Where No Man Has Gone Before". A slightly edited version with the same title aired in 1966 as the third episode of the new series.

"The Cage" never aired during Star Trek's original run. It was presented by Roddenberry as a black-and-white workprint at various science fiction conventions over the years after Star Trek's cancellation but was not released on home video until 1986 when Paramount Home Video produced a "restored" release of "The Cage" (a combination of the original black-and-white footage and color portions of the Season 1 episode "The Menagerie") along with an introduction by Gene Roddenberry.

On October 15, 1988, Paramount Pictures aired a two-hour television special, hosted by Patrick Stewart, called The Star Trek Saga: From One Generation to the Next, which featured, for the first time, a full-color television presentation of "The Cage". In the United States, "The Cage" was released to DVD in December 2001. It was later included on the final disc in both the original and "remastered" season 3 DVD box sets listed with its original air date of October 15, 1988.

"Where No Man Has Gone Before" in its original form (production number 02a) had been forwarded to NBC, but only a re-edited version was aired, not as a pilot but as the third episode of the series (production number 02b). The original version was thought to be lost, but later appeared on bootleg VHS tapes at conventions, until a print of it was discovered in 2009 and subsequently released on home video under the title "Where No Fan Has Gone Before" - The Restored, Unaired Alternate Pilot Episode as part of the TOS season 3 box set on Blu-ray; it has not been released on DVD.

Title	Directed by	Written by	Original release date	Prod. code
"The Cage"	Robert Butler	Gene Roddenberry	October 4, 1988	01
The crew of the Enterprise follow a distress signal to the planet Talos IV, where Captain Pike is taken captive by a group of telepathic aliens who create realistic illusions. The events of this pilot are revisited in the two-part Season 1 episode "The Menagerie".
"Where No Man Has Gone Before" (pilot version)	James Goldstone	Samuel A. Peeples	-	02a
After the Enterprise attempts to cross the Great Barrier at the edge of the galaxy, crew members Gary Mitchell and Elizabeth Dehner develop "godlike" psychic powers which threaten the safety of the crew and of humanity itself. Note: A re-edited version of the episode was aired as the third episode of the first season.

=== Season 1 (1966–67) ===
After Roddenberry's second pilot episode, "Where No Man Has Gone Before", received a more favorable response from NBC, Star Trek finally aired its first episode—"The Man Trap"—at 8:30PM on September 8, 1966. "Where No Man...", which eventually aired in a re-edited format as the series' third episode, retained only Spock as a character from "The Cage" but introduced William Shatner as Captain James T. Kirk, James Doohan as chief engineer Scotty, and George Takei as physicist (later helmsman) Sulu. Also joining the cast were DeForest Kelley as ship's surgeon Dr. Leonard "Bones" McCoy and Nichelle Nichols as the communications officer Uhura in "The Man Trap", the first aired episode of the series.

Although her character of Number One was not retained from "The Cage", Majel Barrett returned to the series as a new character, nurse Christine Chapel, and made her first of many recurring appearances in "The Naked Time". Grace Lee Whitney appeared in eight episodes as yeoman Janice Rand, beginning with "The Man Trap". Whitney left the series after "The Conscience of the King", but would later make minor appearances in the first, third, fourth, and sixth Star Trek films as well as one episode of the companion series Star Trek: Voyager.

Star Trek's first season comprised 29 episodes, including the two-part episode "The Menagerie", which includes almost all of the footage from the original pilot, "The Cage". Other notable episodes include "Balance of Terror", which introduces the Romulans; "Space Seed", which introduces Khan Noonien Singh and serves as the basis for Star Trek II: The Wrath of Khan; "Errand of Mercy", in which the Klingons make their first appearance; and the critically-acclaimed, Hugo-Award-winning episode "The City on the Edge of Forever", guest-starring Joan Collins, which features Kirk, Spock, and McCoy traveling into the past through the Guardian of Forever.

No. overall	No. in season	Title	Directed by	Written by	Original release date	Prod. code	U.S. households (in millions)
1	1	"The Man Trap"	Marc Daniels	George Clayton Johnson	September 8, 1966	06	11.36
2	2	"Charlie X"	Lawrence Dobkin	Story by : Gene Roddenberry; Teleplay by : D. C. Fontana	September 15, 1966	08	10.10
3	3	"Where No Man Has Gone Before"	James Goldstone	Samuel A. Peeples	September 22, 1966	02b	10.38
4	4	"The Naked Time"	Marc Daniels	John D. F. Black	September 29, 1966	07	10.05
5	5	"The Enemy Within"	Leo Penn	Richard Matheson	October 6, 1966	05	9.06
6	6	"Mudd's Women"	Harvey Hart	Story by : Gene Roddenberry; Teleplay by : Stephen Kandel	October 13, 1966	04	9.83
7	7	"What Are Little Girls Made Of?"	James Goldstone	Robert Bloch	October 20, 1966	10	9.39
8	8	"Miri"	Vincent McEveety	Adrian Spies	October 27, 1966	12	8.95
9	9	"Dagger of the Mind"	Vincent McEveety	Shimon Wincelberg (Note: Credited as S. Bar-David)	November 3, 1966	11	9.94
10	10	"The Corbomite Maneuver"	Joseph Sargent	Jerry Sohl	November 10, 1966	03	9.55
11	11	"The Menagerie"	Marc Daniels	Gene Roddenberry	November 17, 1966	16	9.50
12	12	"The Menagerie"	Robert Butler	Gene Roddenberry	November 24, 1966	16	10.21
13	13	"The Conscience of the King"	Gerd Oswald	Barry Trivers	December 8, 1966	13	8.62
14	14	"Balance of Terror"	Vincent McEveety	Paul Schneider	December 15, 1966	09	8.51
15	15	"Shore Leave"	Robert Sparr	Theodore Sturgeon	December 29, 1966	17	10.10
16	16	"The Galileo Seven"	Robert Gist	Story by : Oliver Crawford; Teleplay by : Oliver Crawford and Shimon Wincelberg	January 5, 1967	14	8.89
17	17	"The Squire of Gothos"	Don McDougall	Paul Schneider	January 12, 1967	18	10.82
18	18	"Arena"	Joseph Pevney	Story by : Fredric Brown; Teleplay by : Gene L. Coon	January 19, 1967	19	10.54
19	19	"Tomorrow Is Yesterday"	Michael O'Herlihy	D. C. Fontana	January 26, 1967	21	10.98
20	20	"Court Martial"	Marc Daniels	Story by : Don M. Mankiewicz; Teleplay by : Don M. Mankiewicz and Steven W. Carabatsos	February 2, 1967	15	10.05
21	21	"The Return of the Archons"	Joseph Pevney	Story by : Gene Roddenberry; Teleplay by : Boris Sobelman	February 9, 1967	22	10.93
22	22	"Space Seed"	Marc Daniels	Story by : Carey Wilber; Teleplay by : Gene L. Coon and Carey Wilber	February 16, 1967	24	9.94
23	23	"A Taste of Armageddon"	Joseph Pevney	Story by : Robert Hamner; Teleplay by : Robert Hamner and Gene L. Coon	February 23, 1967	23	10.98
24	24	"This Side of Paradise"	Ralph Senensky	Story by : Jerry Sohl (Note: Credited as Nathan Butler) and D. C. Fontana; Teleplay by : D. C. Fontana	March 2, 1967	25	10.10
25	25	"The Devil in the Dark"	Joseph Pevney	Gene L. Coon	March 9, 1967	26	10.38
26	26	"Errand of Mercy"	John Newland	Gene L. Coon	March 23, 1967	27	9.50
27	27	"The Alternative Factor"	Gerd Oswald	Don Ingalls	March 30, 1967	20	9.33
28	28	"The City on the Edge of Forever"	Joseph Pevney	Harlan Ellison	April 6, 1967	28	9.39
29	29	"Operation – Annihilate!"	Herschel Daugherty	Steven W. Carabatsos	April 13, 1967	29	9.72

=== Season 2 (1967–68) ===
The show's 26-episode second season began in September 1967 with "Amok Time", which introduced actor Walter Koenig as Russian navigator Pavel Chekov, and granted viewers the first glimpse of Spock's homeworld, Vulcan. The season also includes such notable episodes as "Mirror, Mirror", which introduces the evil "mirror universe"; "Journey to Babel", featuring the introduction of Spock's parents Sarek and Amanda; and the light-hearted "The Trouble with Tribbles", which would later be revisited in a 1973 episode of Star Trek: The Animated Series and a 1996 episode of Star Trek: Deep Space Nine. The season ended with "Assignment: Earth", an attempt to launch a spin-off television series set in the 1960s.

No. overall	No. in season	Title	Directed by	Written by	Original release date	Prod. code	U.S. households (in millions)
30	1	"Amok Time"	Joseph Pevney	Theodore Sturgeon	September 15, 1967	34	7.17
31	2	"Who Mourns for Adonais?"	Marc Daniels	Gilbert Ralston	September 22, 1967	33	8.18
32	3	"The Changeling"	Marc Daniels	John Meredyth Lucas	September 29, 1967	37	8.46
33	4	"Mirror, Mirror"	Marc Daniels	Jerome Bixby	October 6, 1967	39	7.62
34	5	"The Apple"	Joseph Pevney	Story by : Max Ehrlich; Teleplay by : Max Ehrlich and Gene L. Coon	October 13, 1967	38	7.90
35	6	"The Doomsday Machine"	Marc Daniels	Norman Spinrad	October 20, 1967	35	7.73
36	7	"Catspaw"	Joseph Pevney	Robert Bloch	October 27, 1967	30	8.85
37	8	"I, Mudd"	Marc Daniels	Stephen Kandel	November 3, 1967	41	8.23
38	9	"Metamorphosis"	Ralph Senensky	Gene L. Coon	November 10, 1967	31	7.11
39	10	"Journey to Babel"	Joseph Pevney	D. C. Fontana	November 17, 1967	44	7.28
40	11	"Friday's Child"	Joseph Pevney	D. C. Fontana	December 1, 1967	32	8.74
41	12	"The Deadly Years"	Joseph Pevney	David P. Harmon	December 8, 1967	40	9.91
42	13	"Obsession"	Ralph Senensky	Art Wallace	December 15, 1967	47	9.18
43	14	"Wolf in the Fold"	Joseph Pevney	Robert Bloch	December 22, 1967	36	N/A
44	15	"The Trouble with Tribbles"	Joseph Pevney	David Gerrold	December 29, 1967	42	8.85
45	16	"The Gamesters of Triskelion"	Gene Nelson	Margaret Armen	January 5, 1968	46	10.92
46	17	"A Piece of the Action"	James Komack	Story by : David P. Harmon; Teleplay by : David P. Harmon and Gene L. Coon	January 12, 1968	49	9.97
47	18	"The Immunity Syndrome"	Joseph Pevney	Robert Sabaroff	January 19, 1968	48	9.46
48	19	"A Private Little War"	Marc Daniels	Story by : Don Ingalls (Note: Credited as Jud Crucis); Teleplay by : Gene Roddenberry	February 2, 1968	45	9.52
49	20	"Return to Tomorrow"	Ralph Senensky	John T. Dugan (Note: Credited as John Kingsbridge)	February 9, 1968	51	10.14
50	21	"Patterns of Force"	Vincent McEveety	John Meredyth Lucas	February 16, 1968	52	8.34
51	22	"By Any Other Name"	Marc Daniels	Story by : Jerome Bixby; Teleplay by : D. C. Fontana and Jerome Bixby	February 23, 1968	50	8.79
52	23	"The Omega Glory"	Vincent McEveety	Gene Roddenberry	March 1, 1968	54	8.79
53	24	"The Ultimate Computer"	John Meredyth Lucas	Story by : Laurence N. Wolfe; Teleplay by : D. C. Fontana	March 8, 1968	53	8.74
54	25	"Bread and Circuses"	Ralph Senensky	Gene Roddenberry and Gene L. Coon	March 15, 1968	43	12.10
55	26	"Assignment: Earth"	Marc Daniels	Story by : Gene Roddenberry and Art Wallace; Teleplay by : Art Wallace	March 29, 1968	55	8.79

=== Season 3 (1968–69) ===
After Star Trek's second season, word got around that NBC was prepared to cancel the show due to low ratings. Led by fans Bjo and John Trimble, Trek viewers inundated NBC with letters protesting the show's demise and pleading with the network to renew the series for another year. The president and vice-president of the television network, Don Durgin and Mort Werner, said in an interview that they received 115,000 letters, but that cancelling the show was "never our intention," and that it would be on the schedule in the favorable timeslot of Monday at 7:30p.m.

The network later changed the schedule so that Trek would air in the so-called "death slot"—Friday nights at 10:00 p.m. In addition to the "mismanaged" schedule, the show's budget was "seriously slashed" and Nichelle Nichols described the series' eventual cancellation as "a self-fulfilling prophecy".

Star Trek's final, 24-episode season began in September 1968 with "Spock's Brain". The third season also includes "The Tholian Web", where Kirk becomes trapped between universes; this episode would later be revisited by two 2005 episodes of the prequel series Star Trek: Enterprise. The last episode of the series, "Turnabout Intruder", aired on June 3, 1969, but Star Trek would eventually return to television in animated form when the animated Star Trek debuted in September 1973.

No. overall	No. in season	Title	Directed by	Written by	Original release date	Prod. code	U.S. households (in millions)
56	1	"Spock's Brain"	Marc Daniels	Gene L. Coon (Note: Credited as Lee Cronin)	September 20, 1968	61	9.18
57	2	"The Enterprise Incident"	John Meredyth Lucas	D. C. Fontana	September 27, 1968	59	6.67
58	3	"The Paradise Syndrome"	Jud Taylor	Margaret Armen	October 4, 1968	58	7.58
59	4	"And the Children Shall Lead"	Marvin Chomsky	Edward J. Lakso	October 11, 1968	60	7.98
60	5	"Is There in Truth No Beauty?"	Ralph Senensky	Jean Lisette Aroeste	October 18, 1968	62	7.35
61	6	"Spectre of the Gun"	Vincent McEveety	Gene L. Coon	October 25, 1968	56	7.70
62	7	"Day of the Dove"	Marvin Chomsky	Jerome Bixby	November 1, 1968	66	7.98
63	8	"For the World Is Hollow and I Have Touched the Sky"	Tony Leader	Hendrik Vollaerts	November 8, 1968	65	7.52
64	9	"The Tholian Web"	Herb Wallerstein	Judy Burns and Chet Richards	November 15, 1968	64	7.64
65	10	"Plato's Stepchildren"	David Alexander	Meyer Dolinsky	November 22, 1968	67	7.41
66	11	"Wink of an Eye"	Jud Taylor	Story by : Gene L. Coon; Teleplay by : Arthur Heinemann	November 29, 1968	68	8.72
67	12	"The Empath"	John Erman	Joyce Muskat	December 6, 1968	63	9.86
68	13	"Elaan of Troyius"	John Meredyth Lucas	John Meredyth Lucas	December 20, 1968	57	7.81
69	14	"Whom Gods Destroy"	Herb Wallerstein	Story by : Lee Erwin and Jerry Sohl; Teleplay by : Lee Erwin	January 3, 1969	71	6.84
70	15	"Let That Be Your Last Battlefield"	Jud Taylor	Story by : Gene L. Coon; Teleplay by : Oliver Crawford	January 10, 1969	70	7.92
71	16	"The Mark of Gideon"	Jud Taylor	George F. Slavin and Stanley Adams	January 17, 1969	72	6.78
72	17	"That Which Survives"	Herb Wallerstein	Story by : D. C. Fontana (Note: Credited as Michael Richards); Teleplay by : John Meredyth Lucas	January 24, 1969	69	7.81
73	18	"The Lights of Zetar"	Herb Kenwith	Jeremy Tarcher and Shari Lewis	January 31, 1969	73	8.09
74	19	"Requiem for Methuselah"	Murray Golden	Jerome Bixby	February 14, 1969	76	6.95
75	20	"The Way to Eden"	David Alexander	Story by : D. C. Fontana and Arthur Heinemann; Teleplay by : Arthur Heinemann	February 21, 1969	75	7.07
76	21	"The Cloud Minders"	Jud Taylor	Story by : David Gerrold and Oliver Crawford; Teleplay by : Margaret Armen	February 28, 1969	74	7.58
77	22	"The Savage Curtain"	Herschel Daugherty	Story by : Gene Roddenberry; Teleplay by : Gene Roddenberry and Arthur Heinemann	March 7, 1969	77	6.73
78	23	"All Our Yesterdays"	Marvin Chomsky	Jean Lisette Aroeste	March 14, 1969	78	7.41
79	24	"Turnabout Intruder"	Herb Wallerstein	Story by : Gene Roddenberry; Teleplay by : Arthur Singer	June 3, 1969	79	5.02

== Production order ==
The list below details the series' episodes in production order, including the original series pilot, "The Cage". While the "complete season" DVD releases (listed above) follow the original broadcast order, the original episodic DVD releases are numbered by production order.

Pilots
01	"The Cage"
02a	"Where No Man Has Gone Before"

Season 1
02b	"Where No Man Has Gone Before"
03	"The Corbomite Maneuver"
04	"Mudd's Women"
05	"The Enemy Within"
06	"The Man Trap"
07	"The Naked Time"
08	"Charlie X"
09	"Balance of Terror"
10	"What Are Little Girls Made Of?"
11	"Dagger of the Mind"
12	"Miri"
13	"The Conscience of the King"
14	"The Galileo Seven"
15	"Court Martial"
16	"The Menagerie, Parts I and II"
17	"Shore Leave"
18	"The Squire of Gothos"
19	"Arena"
20	"The Alternative Factor"
21	"Tomorrow Is Yesterday"
22	"The Return of the Archons"
23	"A Taste of Armageddon"
24	"Space Seed"
25	"This Side of Paradise"
26	"The Devil in the Dark"
27	"Errand of Mercy"
28	"The City on the Edge of Forever"
29	"Operation -- Annihilate!"

Season 2
30	"Catspaw"
31	"Metamorphosis"
32	"Friday's Child"
33	"Who Mourns for Adonais?"
34	"Amok Time"
35	"The Doomsday Machine"
36	"Wolf in the Fold"
37	"The Changeling"
38	"The Apple"
39	"Mirror, Mirror"
40	"The Deadly Years"
41	"I, Mudd"
42	"The Trouble with Tribbles"
43	"Bread and Circuses"
44	"Journey to Babel"
45	"A Private Little War"
46	"The Gamesters of Triskelion"
47	"Obsession"
48	"The Immunity Syndrome"
49	"A Piece of the Action"
50	"By Any Other Name"
51	"Return to Tomorrow"
52	"Patterns of Force"
53	"The Ultimate Computer"
54	"The Omega Glory"
55	"Assignment: Earth"

Season 3
56	"Spectre of the Gun"
57	"Elaan of Troyius"
58	"The Paradise Syndrome"
59	"The Enterprise Incident"
60	"And the Children Shall Lead"
61	"Spock's Brain"
62	"Is There in Truth No Beauty?"
63	"The Empath"
64	"The Tholian Web"
65	"For the World Is Hollow and I Have Touched the Sky"
66	"Day of the Dove"
67	"Plato's Stepchildren"
68	"Wink of an Eye"
69	"That Which Survives"
70	"Let That Be Your Last Battlefield"
71	"Whom Gods Destroy"
72	"The Mark of Gideon"
73	"The Lights of Zetar"
74	"The Cloud Minders"
75	"The Way to Eden"
76	"Requiem for Methuselah"
77	"The Savage Curtain"
78	"All Our Yesterdays"
79	"Turnabout Intruder"

== British transmission ==
Star Trek was first broadcast in the United Kingdom on BBC One starting on July 12, 1969, with the episode "Where No Man Has Gone Before". The show was broadcast in colour from the outset. The episodes were broadcast in a different order than in the United States and were originally aired in four seasons between 1969 and 1971. The BBC edited the episodes for broadcast by showing the title sequence first, then the teaser segment that aired before the titles in the United States, then the rest of the episode. These edited episodes aired until the 1990s, after which the BBC was supplied with NTSC videotape transfers of the first season instead of new film prints, resulting in a substandard picture, and with edits originally made for syndication in the United States. Viewer complaints led to the BBC obtaining film prints for the subsequent two seasons.

"The Cage" was first broadcast on Sky One in July 1990. Three episodes, "Plato's Stepchildren", "The Empath", and "Whom Gods Destroy", were not broadcast on the BBC until 1994, although "The Empath" was listed in the Radio Times as scheduled to broadcast on December 16, 1970, at 7:20 pm. Sky One was the first network to air these three episodes in the UK in 1990, although with the title sequence and teaser shown in the order as they were aired in the United States, whereas the rest of the episodes were broadcast as edited by the BBC.

== See also ==
- Lists of Star Trek episodes
