= Star Trek: The Original Series season 2 =

Star Trek: The Original Series
- Season 2
- DVD and Blu-ray cover
- Starring: William Shatner; Leonard Nimoy; DeForest Kelley
- No. of episodes: 26

Release
- Original network: NBC
- Original release: September 15, 1967 – March 29, 1968

Season chronology
- ← Previous; Season 1 Next → Season 3

The second season of the American science fiction television series Star Trek, premiered on NBC on September 15, 1967, and concluded on March 29, 1968. It consisted of twenty-six episodes. It features William Shatner as Captain James T. Kirk, Leonard Nimoy as Spock and DeForest Kelley as Leonard McCoy.

== Broadcast history ==
The season originally aired Fridays at 8:30–9:30 pm (EST) on NBC.

== Cast ==
=== Main ===
- William Shatner as Captain James T. Kirk: The commanding officer of the USS Enterprise.
- Leonard Nimoy as Commander Spock: The ship's half-human/half-Vulcan science officer and first/executive officer (i.e. second-in-command).
- DeForest Kelley as Lieutenant Commander Dr. Leonard "Bones" McCoy: The ship's chief medical officer.
- James Doohan as Lieutenant Commander Montgomery "Scotty" Scott: The Enterprise's chief engineer and second officer (i.e. third-in-command).
- Nichelle Nichols as Lieutenant Uhura: The ship's communications officer.
- George Takei as Lieutenant Sulu: The ship's helmsman.
- Walter Koenig as Ensign Pavel Chekov: A Russian-born navigator introduced in the second-season premiere episode.
- Majel Barrett as Nurse Christine Chapel: The ship's head nurse. Barrett, who played the ship's first officer (number one) in "The Cage," also voiced the ship's computer.

=== Recurring ===
- Eddie Paskey as Lt. Leslie

== Episodes ==
No. overall	No. in season	Title	Directed by	Written by	Original release date	Prod. code	U.S. households (in millions)
30	1	"Amok Time"	Joseph Pevney	Theodore Sturgeon	September 15, 1967	34	7.17
When Mr. Spock begins behaving aggressively, Kirk discovers his first officer must return home to Vulcan to be married or die. Kirk disobeys his orders from Starfleet Command to visit Altair 6 and decides to save Spock. Spock, Kirk, and McCoy land on Vulcan where Spock takes them to his family land to begin pon farr. They meet T'Pau and T'Pring only to find that T'Pring wants a duel and chooses Kirk as a challenger. Kirk accepts the challenge thinking to let Spock win but is later told by T'Pau that it is a challenge to the death. During the fight, McCoy gives Kirk a neuro-tranquilizer to fake his death. Upon victory, Spock asks T'Pring to explain her decision and decides not to marry her. After beaming back to the Enterprise, Spock is overjoyed to see Kirk alive.
31	2	"Who Mourns for Adonais?"	Marc Daniels	Gilbert Ralston	September 22, 1967	33	8.18
The Enterprise is held captive within an energy field which is controlled by an alien who claims to be the Greek god Apollo. Apollo commands Kirk to meet him on the planet's surface. Bones, Chekov, Scotty, and Lieutenant Carolyn Palamas accompany Kirk. Apollo demands the crew worship him as a god at his temple, captivating Carolyn and attacking Scotty when he disobeys. Spock finds a way to get through the energy field and helps Kirk to take down the temple that was its power source.
32	3	"The Changeling"	Marc Daniels	John Meredyth Lucas	September 29, 1967	37	8.46
The crew of the Enterprise deals with Nomad — an indestructible, planet-destroying space probe that thinks Kirk is its creator. The space probe is beamed up and after completing an analysis, Mr. Spock reveals that its real creator is Jackson Roykirk, a scientist from the twentieth century. Spock enters the mind of Nomad and finds out the original space probe was destroyed when another alien probe somehow united with it, deleting its memory banks and resulting in a new machine with a new objective: sterilize all units which are imperfect. When Nomad takes control of the Enterprise, Kirk tells Nomad the truth making it realize that Nomad itself is flawed and must destroy itself. Star Trek: The Motion Picture was in part an expansion of this episode.
33	4	"Mirror, Mirror"	Marc Daniels	Jerome Bixby	October 6, 1967	39	7.62
A transporter mishap slips Captain Kirk and his companions into a parallel universe, where the Enterprise serves a barbaric Empire instead of the Federation. Kirk, Bones, Scotty, and Uhura try to act appropriately for their new environment while figuring out how to get back to their universe where their Empire equivalents beamed. In this mirror universe, Mr. Chekov tried to kill Captain Kirk to succeed as Captain but failed and was sent to the torture booth. The Empire Spock receives a command from Starfleet base to execute Captain Kirk if he does not annihilate the planet Halkan by dawn, which he tells Kirk. Bones and Scotty reprogram the transporter to beam them back but are encountered by Spock in Sick Bay. Spock attacks them but is defeated and about to die. Kirk allows Bones to treat him while the others go to the transporter room. Mirror Spock learns the truth about the twin universes and brings Bones to the transporter room where he helps them transport back to our universe where Spock is waiting for them. This episode spun off several plotlines in Deep Space Nine, Enterprise and Discovery.
34	5	"The Apple"	Joseph Pevney	Story by : Max Ehrlich; Teleplay by : Max Ehrlich and Gene L. Coon	October 13, 1967	38	7.90
The crew of the Enterprise visits a mysterious and deadly paradise planet which they discover is controlled by a machine called Vaal. The landing party, which includes Kirk, Spock, Bones and Chekov, are enchanted by the planet but encounter a strange flower that kills two members of the party. A mysterious bolt of lightning hurts Spock and disrupts the transporter room of the Enterprise. The surviving landing party finds a group of men and women who are controlled by Vaal. Vaal restricts their knowledge of human interactions such as sexual intercourse and has the island's inhabitants feed it an explosive mineral found on the island in order to fuel itself. Vaal orders the inhabitants to kill the landing party by morning when it becomes clear that they represent a threat to the inhabitants' current way of life. Scotty finds a way to route all the power to the ship's phasers while Kirk and Bones prevent Vaal from being fed any more explosive mineral. Vaal loses strength as a result and becomes vulnerable which allows the Enterprise to destroy Vaal and free the inhabitants.
35	6	"The Doomsday Machine"	Marc Daniels	Norman Spinrad	October 20, 1967	35	7.73
After losing his entire crew to a planet-eating alien machine from another galaxy, Commodore Matt Decker pulls rank on Kirk in order to play a game of cat-and-mouse with the mechanical adversary. His efforts to destroy the menace place the Enterprise in grave danger. This episode serves as the backstory for the Star Trek 25th Anniversary Game Boy game.
36	7	"Catspaw"	Joseph Pevney	Robert Bloch	October 27, 1967	30	8.85
Two powerful aliens threaten the well-being of the Enterprise and her crew with their magical powers. Scotty, Sulu, and Jackson from the landing party go missing on a planet known to be uninhabited. Upon returning Jackson dies, giving Kirk a warning to leave the system. Kirk, Spock and Bones beam down to find a mysterious castle. A man and a woman, Korob and Sylvia, meet them and they find that Korob and Sylvia are not from this system but have moved here with the intention of learning more about the humans. Korob has good intentions, but Sylvia is determined to learn about humans and captures Sulu, Scotty, and Bones completely by mind control. Kirk uses seductive tricks on Sylvia to get the truth and destroys their 'transmuter' power source to free the entire landing party and end the illusions.
37	8	"I, Mudd"	Marc Daniels	Stephen Kandel	November 3, 1967	41	8.23
Captain Kirk and the crew have a second run-in with the con man, Harry Mudd, this time finding him as the king of a planet of androids. The Enterprise is captured by an android which takes the entire crew to an uncharted planet in the galaxy. Kirk, Spock, Bones, Uhura, Scotty, and Chekov land with the android on the planet to find Harry Mudd as the King of the planet and about 200,000 androids to serve him. He reveals that the androids want to learn about and serve humans and demanded more specimens. Harry Mudd plans to leave the entire crew of the Enterprise behind and take the starship. By unraveling the weak points of the androids, the crew of the Enterprise damage the main control unit 'Norman', reprogram the androids to serve their original purpose of settling the planet, gain control of the Enterprise and leave Harry Mudd behind to live with the humorous androids.
38	9	"Metamorphosis"	Ralph Senensky	Gene L. Coon	November 10, 1967	31	7.11
A shuttle crew from the Enterprise encounters a castaway who appears to be Zefram Cochrane, the inventor of warp drive, and his mysterious alien Companion. Kirk, Bones, Spock and a disease-stricken officer are brought down on a planet surface en route to the Enterprise where they meet Zefram Cochrane, who is recorded to be dead for 150 years. Cochrane explains that the Companion, a mysterious energy field, keeps him alive and well, but recently decided that he needed a companion. After investigating and challenging the alien Companion, Kirk realizes that the Companion has feelings for Cochrane and finds a way to get back to the Enterprise in a surprisingly romantic episode.
39	10	"Journey to Babel"	Joseph Pevney	D. C. Fontana	November 17, 1967	44	7.28
While transporting dignitaries to an important peace conference on the planet Babel, the Enterprise is pursued by a mysterious vessel and, after a quarrel between the Vulcan ambassador, Sarek (Spock's father), and the Tellarite ambassador, the latter is killed, with Sarek as the main suspect. Kirk is then attacked and badly injured by the assassin, exonerating Sarek but requiring that Spock take charge of the Enterprise. An ethical dilemma arises when Sarek falls ill and needs Spock's blood for a risky life-saving operation. To his mother's distress Spock puts his duty ahead of his father's life. Kirk and Bones find a way to allow Spock to assist in the operation, while a still-injured Kirk tries to uncover the assassin's plan and engages the attacking starship.
40	11	"Friday's Child"	Joseph Pevney	D. C. Fontana	December 1, 1967	32	8.74
The crew of the Enterprise become entangled in a planet's tribal power struggle. Upon landing and seeing a Klingon, one crew member is killed by the tribe. In a problematic turn of events, the leader of the 10 tribes is killed and Maab, who supports the Klingons, is the one who takes charge. The woman Eleen along with the landing party of Kirk, Spock, and Bones manage to escape but cannot contact the Enterprise which has been tricked into leaving the planet's orbit to follow a distress signal. Eleen and the others manage to hide out. Maab realizes the Klingons' true intention and the Enterprise manages to return in time to help the landing party and get the deal with the tribespeople.
41	12	"The Deadly Years"	Joseph Pevney	David P. Harmon	December 8, 1967	40	9.91
Strange radiation exposes the command crew of the Enterprise to the effects of rapid aging. A landing party of Chekov, Kirk, Spock, Bones, Scotty, and Lieutenant Galway divide into small teams to find the planet Gamma Hydra Four's colonists. Chekov enters a building and is shocked to see a dead man and calls others. The landing party meets two other people who are old in appearance but young in age. Bones concludes the analysis and says the two other people have only a few days to live because their bodily functions are aging about 30 years a day. The same thing begins to happen to the landing party upon getting back to the Enterprise. Scotty, Bones, Spock, Kirk and Galway start to get old, but Chekov does not. The aging inhibits the decision-making abilities of Captain Kirk and Spock. A Commodore Stocker who is a passenger aboard the Enterprise takes command of the ship. He makes a bad decision taking the Enterprise into the Neutral Zone and into a deadly attack by the Romulans. From an idea Bones has about why Chekov was immune, Spock and Dr. Janet Wallace (who is also a passenger aboard) devise a vaccine containing adrenaline that Kirk readily tests. It works and Kirk immediately resumes command of the Enterprise and tricks the Romulans, saving the Enterprise.
42	13	"Obsession"	Ralph Senensky	Art Wallace	December 15, 1967	47	9.18
Captain Kirk becomes obsessed with destroying a murderous entity that killed many of the crew of his old ship. After finding a mysterious cloud that quickly kills three crew members, Captain Kirk is determined to find a way to understand it and destroy it, stopping it from spreading to more planetary systems. Kirk recalls his past experience with this cloud a few years earlier in a different planetary system on the other side of the galaxy. His obsession with this cloud starts to interfere with his decision-making skills as the commander of the starship prompting a medical record from Bones and Spock. Soon, Spock and Bones realize why Kirk is obsessed with this cloud. The Enterprise begins attacking the cloud only to realize that the cloud is not running away and manages to enter the air circulation system of the Enterprise. Kirk, Spock and Bones finally devise a way to destroy the cloud.
43	14	"Wolf in the Fold"	Joseph Pevney	Robert Bloch	December 22, 1967	36	N/A
Mr. Scott is implicated in a series of bizarre murders. On planet Argelius during a planned break, Scotty, Kirk and Bones encounter a series of events where Scotty is blamed for murdering three women, two local to the planet, and one crew member aboard the Enterprise, Lt. Tracy. The Prefect wants to investigate the murder on the planet but all methods seem futile. Once aboard the Enterprise, the computer, fed with all medical records of Scotty, begins analyzing Scotty's responses to all the questions. The committee realizes that Scotty is not lying and indeed someone/something else is responsible for the murder. The committee finds that the thing resembles Jack the Ripper, who has been rumored to exist throughout the 19th, 20th and 21st centuries on all systems between Earth and Argelius. Upon further analysis, Hengist, security adviser to the Prefect, is found to be possessed by the creature which causes fear in humanoids and kills them. It takes control of the Enterprise and threatens to kill them all. Spock overrides the controls, setting them to manual, overloads the computer banks by getting it to calculate the last digit of pi, impairing the thing for a few hours while Bones tranquilizes the entire crew aboard. The thing is captured inside Hengist finally and transported to the furthermost regions of the galaxy in thousands of small pieces.
44	15	"The Trouble with Tribbles"	Joseph Pevney	David Gerrold	December 29, 1967	42	8.85
Tribbles – purring, fluffy, and fertile creatures – disrupt the exploitation of a disputed planet between the Klingon Empire and the Federation. The Enterprise responds to a priority 1 distress signal from Space Station K7 on the edge of the Neutral Zone and close to Sherman's Planet. Mr. Baris asks Kirk to provide protection to the storage facility on the space station to preserve an improved grain that will help the Federation to gain control of Sherman's Planet and prevent the Klingons from capturing it. Kirk sanctions the security guard and also gives shore leave to the crew aboard the Enterprise. Uhura and Chekov find an interesting creature called a tribble on the station and bring it aboard the Enterprise. Tribbles begin to reproduce exponentially and spread everywhere on the Enterprise. A Klingon ship also reaches the K7 facility for shore leave and Kirk allows it under the Enterprise's protection. Tribbles begin to enter the vent systems of the Enterprise and Space Station K7, destroying the crop. Later it is revealed that the crop was poisoned by a Klingon spy aboard the space station. The poison also killed the Tribbles that ate the grain. Kirk finds the spy and Scotty finds a way to get rid of the tribbles from the Enterprise.
45	16	"The Gamesters of Triskelion"	Gene Nelson	Margaret Armen	January 5, 1968	46	10.92
Captain Kirk, Chekov and Uhura are kidnapped by powerful disembodied aliens and forced to fight in gladiatorial contests for the aliens' gambling entertainment. While trying to beam down to planet Gamma 2, Kirk, Uhura and Chekov are transported to a mysterious planet, Triskelion, that has never been mapped by the Federation. There, the three of them are captured and trained in fighting skills by trainers called Thralls. Any act of disobedience is met with pain through collars around their necks. The Enterprise, now commanded by Spock, leaves the Gamma 2 system and finds a hydrogen cloud with mysterious energy fields. On Triskelion, Kirk manages to impress the Providers and bonds with his Thrall to learn more about the Providers. While trying to run away, the Providers show their true selves and wager a deal with Kirk for one last fight between Kirk and three Thralls. Kirk manages to defeat them, setting all the Thralls free and making the Providers teach the Thralls using all the knowledge they possess.
46	17	"A Piece of the Action"	James Komack	Story by : David P. Harmon; Teleplay by : David P. Harmon and Gene L. Coon	January 12, 1968	49	9.97
The Enterprise visits a planet with a violent culture based on America's 1920s Prohibition era. After receiving a 100-year-late report from an old starship, Kirk, Bones, and Spock decide to beam down to the Iotian planet to learn about their way of life and are surprised that the entire society is based on 1920s-era Chicago mob culture. Realizing that the Enterprise must help rectify this situation, Kirk decides to collect all the bosses in one place and form a syndicate but runs into trouble with the two biggest bosses, Bela and Krako. Kirk captures Bela and transports Krako to the Enterprise before tricking the rest of the bosses into gathering together. Using Starfleet Command as the oversight body, Kirk forms the syndicate, to be headed by Bela with Krako as his lieutenant. Kirk hopes that they can teach a new style of living to these people under the surveillance of the Federation.
47	18	"The Immunity Syndrome"	Joseph Pevney	Robert Sabaroff	January 19, 1968	48	9.46
The crew of the Enterprise encounters an energy-draining space creature. On their way to Starfleet Command base 6, the Enterprise receives orders to check on Starship Intrepid in Gamma 7 solar system. They find a black space covering the path to the system with no stars visible through it. Upon crossing into the space, the Enterprise begins to lose energy and is pulled towards a single-celled organism that is massive in size. After losing two probes to investigate the organism and failing in an attempt to pull away, Kirk chooses Spock to take the shuttlecraft into the organism membrane, investigate it and find a way to destroy it. Spock finds that the organism is about to reproduce and has a nucleus that can be attacked with a full charge of antimatter energy. Kirk manages to send a probe with the help of Scotty equipped with a timed bomb of antimatter energy and the Enterprise begins to drift out of the membrane tugging the shuttlecraft. Finally, the organism is destroyed and the galaxy is saved.
48	19	"A Private Little War"	Marc Daniels	Story by : Don Ingalls (Note: Credited as Jud Crucis); Teleplay by : Gene Roddenberry	February 2, 1968	45	9.52
Captain Kirk must decide how to save a primitive people from the technological interference of the Klingons. Upon landing on the planet with a humanoid population, Kirk finds that half of the population, led by his old friend Tyree, is still primitive while the other half has firearms. Spock is shot and is beamed back to the ship to recover. Kirk and McCoy begin an investigation and Kirk is poisoned by a wild beast. With the Enterprise unavailable to help, Tyree's wife, Nona, heals Kirk, but she also attempts to control both Kirk and Tyree. After recovering, Kirk takes Nona away from the camp but is attacked by her. She steals his phaser and runs to the enemy camp but is killed in the ambush. Tyree agrees to use weapons to fight to protect his people. Kirk asks Mr. Scott to make firearms for the primitive people, to maintain a balance of power between the two camps.
49	20	"Return to Tomorrow"	Ralph Senensky	John T. Dugan (Note: Credited as John Kingsbridge)	February 9, 1968	51	10.14
Telepathic aliens take control of Kirk and Spock's bodies with the intention to build new, mechanized bodies for themselves. After receiving a distress signal from a planet deep in the galaxy and far from the last charted area, the Enterprise is contacted by a life form of pure energy that wishes Kirk, Spock, Dr. Mulhall and Bones to beam down. They meet Sargon, a conscious mind trapped in a machine. Sargon explains that their civilization travelled space just like Kirk centuries ago and left people in various star systems to colonize. But this planet suffered a war where all but a few people destroyed themselves. Sargon, his wife and another remain alive like this and wish to take control of Kirk, Spock and Dr. Mulhall's bodies to make android bodies for themselves. The Enterprise accepts their offer after deliberation and Sargon begins work. To allow the body to sustain this transformation, Henock, the third alien, makes a potion to help but has other plans. Sargon devizes a plan to destroy him, apologizes to the Enterprise and accepts their fate thereby ceasing to exist.
50	21	"Patterns of Force"	Vincent McEveety	John Meredyth Lucas	February 16, 1968	52	8.34
The crew of the Enterprise visits a planet dominated by a Nazi culture and at war with its planetary neighbor. The Enterprise is visiting the planet of Ekos that is surrounded by system Zeon inhabitants. Ekosians are violent and Zeons are peaceful people. Enterprise wants to contact a Professor John Gill from Earth who came here to research without interaction but the planet turned into a Nazi-type colony hating the Zeons. Apparently, John Gill becomes the leader of Ekos and hatches a plot to eliminate the Zeons. Spock and Kirk beam down and try to contact John Gill but run into trouble and are captured. They scheme to get out of the jail with one of the Zeons and arrange to meet John Gill but realize that John Gill is drugged and Malekon is controlling the entire process. Bones is beamed down and gives a stimulant that finally works on John Gill, who explains to Kirk what went wrong with his observation mission and saves the day by giving an eye-opening speech to the people of Ekos restoring the peace.
51	22	"By Any Other Name"	Marc Daniels	Story by : Jerome Bixby; Teleplay by : D. C. Fontana and Jerome Bixby	February 23, 1968	50	8.79
Beings from the Andromeda Galaxy steal the Enterprise, technologically modify it, and attempt to return home. Kirk, Spock, Bones, and some crew members beam down to a planet's surface and find a group of people who demand Kirk surrender the ship by paralyzing everyone except Kirk. These people are the inhabitants of the planet Kelvan in the Andromeda galaxy. They crossed the intergalactic boundaries and intergalactic space to the Milky Way to find a sustainable system for their people on a journey spanning over 300 years. Soon, Rojan controls the Enterprise and, along with his people, immobilizes the entire crew aboard and begins the journey for Andromeda. Upon reaching the intergalactic boundary, Spock and Scotty make a plan to blow up the Enterprise to defeat the Kelvans' mission, but Spock says no. Later, Kirk and Spock realize that these people, though they have taken human form, are unable to handle the flow of emotions. Spock, Kirk, Bones, and Scotty begin challenging those emotions to distract the Kelvans and regain control of the Enterprise. They help the Kelvans realize that with the help of the United Federation of Planets, the Kelvans can peacefully make their journey into the Milky Way and live in harmony with other civilizations.
52	23	"The Omega Glory"	Vincent McEveety	Gene Roddenberry	March 1, 1968	54	8.79
Captain Kirk must battle a deadly virus and a treacherous fellow starship captain to stop a meaningless intertribal war. The Enterprise responds to a signal received from the USS Exeter, which is orbiting a planet but not responding to any communications. Upon boarding the ship, Kirk, Bones, and Spock finds that the crew has disappeared and have left behind clothes and a mysterious salt rich in potassium and carbon. Bones realizes that this could be the remains if the crew's bodies lost all their water. Spock plays the last log from the Exeter and finds a message that says everyone is affected by a virus and should not go back to their ship but beam down to the planet's surface. Upon landing, they find Captain Tracey of the Exeter, but he is fighting a war with the inhabitants on the side of the Yangs. The landing party is imprisoned and Bones is instructed to find the cure for the disease so that they can go back to the ship. Kirk, Spock, and Bones realize that the human body develops antibodies for the disease within a few hours if they remain on the surface and then beam back to the Enterprise; the antibodies are natural for the local Yangs and Kohms. Finally, the Yangs realize Kirk follows the same book as them (the American Constitution and flag), but in order to decide who is right, they makes Kirk and Captain Tracey fight in a trial by combat. Spock manages to allure one of the Yangs and trick her into giving back his communicator. Three security personnel beam down and take control of the situation. Finally, Kirk tells the Yangs that their Constitution is for everyone, including Kohms, and they should try to live peacefully here.
53	24	"The Ultimate Computer"	John Meredyth Lucas	Story by : Laurence N. Wolfe; Teleplay by : D. C. Fontana	March 8, 1968	53	8.74
A new computer system causes havoc while being tested aboard the Enterprise. With most of the Enterprise crew deboarded, a new M5 multitronic system is installed to test if it can control the Enterprise and manage operations aboard. Dr. Richard Daystrom has built this M5 unit and will oversee the test. Everything goes as planned as the M5 unit completes the demonstration tasks, but somehow the machine begins gaining too much control of the Enterprise, which starts to worry Spock and Kirk. When Kirk says he wants the M5 to let go of some of the controls the machine begins to see that as a threat and starts locking out all manual controls. This becomes a problem because the next task is a mock battle with three starships, which the M5 thinks are actual attacks. The M5 loads the torpedoes and destroys an unmanned freighter, in a battle exercise it kills all crew aboard USS Excalibur and seriously damages the USS Lexington. Dr. Daystrom tries to talk to the M5 but becomes mentally unstable, so Spock puts him to rest. Then Kirk talks to the M5 and makes it understand that it was designed not to harm humans, a rule the M5 has broken by attacking the USS Lexington and Excalibur. The M5 realizes that its understanding is still weak and destroys itself. Kirk, Spock, Uhura, Scotty and Chekov retake control of the ship and return safely to base.
54	25	"Bread and Circuses"	Ralph Senensky	Gene Roddenberry and Gene L. Coon	March 15, 1968	43	12.10
Captain Kirk and his companions are forced to fight in gladiatorial games on a planet with a civilization similar to the Roman Empire. Kirk, Spock and Bones beam down to a planet to find out why its people live like the ancient Roman Empire where slaves are subjected to fighting in gladiatorial combat. They ask refugees who escaped slavery to help them get into the empire where they meet a former starship captain. All three of them are captured. Spock and Bones are forced to fight and later all three of them are sentenced to the death penalty. However, Kirk, Spock and Bones manage to get back their transponders, and Scotty immediately beams them up.
55	26	"Assignment: Earth"	Marc Daniels	Story by : Gene Roddenberry and Art Wallace; Teleplay by : Art Wallace	March 29, 1968	55	8.79
During a historical research mission in 1968, the Enterprise encounters Gary Seven, a human from the 20th century raised on an advanced alien planet who appears to be attempting to alter history. The Enterprise is on its mission to observe the Earth in 1968 when it beams aboard a mysterious man named Gary Seven. Gary wants to get back to the Earth's surface, but the Enterprise command crew are unable to decide how to proceed. Seven tricks the guards and escapes, leading Kirk and Spock to beam down to the Earth's surface. History suggests that on this day, a crucial spacecraft launch failed in the US that changed the course of history. But Kirk and Spock fail to realize that Seven is trying to help the events take place and not stop them. Using his secret portal, Seven is able to reach the launch site and install the device that will cause the mission to fail. The Enterprise can safely return to its present time.

== Home media ==
The season was released on DVD and Blu-ray by Paramount Home Entertainment. There is earlier version and a remastered version.

There was DVD set release in 2004, and later a remastered version was also released on DVD, which featured some updated special effects in some scenes as well as re-processed color, etc.

The Remastered DVD set also included special features for 'Tribbles', including the episodes "Trials and Tribblations" from Star Trek: Deep Space Nine and "More Tribbles, More Troubles" from Star Trek: The Animated Series. The Remastered DVD set included 8 DVD discs.

== Reception ==
In 2019, CBR rated Season 2 of Star Trek (original series) as the second best season of all Star Trek seasons up to that time, and the best season of the original's three seasons.
