= Obsession (Star Trek: The Original Series) =

- Star Trek: The Original Series episode
- Episode no.: Season 2 Episode 13
- Directed by: Ralph Senensky
- Written by: Art Wallace
- Cinematography by: Jerry Finnerman
- Production code: 047
- Original air date: December 15, 1967

Guest appearances
- Majel Barrett – Nurse Christine Chapel; Stephen Brooks – Ensign Garrovick; Jerry Ayres – Ensign Rizzo; Eddie Paskey – Lt. Leslie; William Blackburn – Lt. Hadley; Frank Da Vinci – Security Guard

Episode chronology
← Previous "The Deadly Years"	Next → "Wolf in the Fold"
- Star Trek: The Original Series season 2

"Obsession" is the thirteenth episode of the second season of the American science fiction television series Star Trek. Written by Art Wallace and directed by Ralph Senensky, it was originally broadcast on December 15, 1967.

In the episode, Captain Kirk becomes obsessed with killing a deadly cloud-like entity. Eleven years prior, Kirk felt he had an opportunity to kill the creature when it attacked his crew.

Ensign Garrovick would later reappear in the Star Trek: Prodigy episode "All the World's a Stage."

== Plot ==
During a planetary survey of Argus 10 being conducted by a team from the Federation starship USS Enterprise, Captain Kirk smells an odor and sends the three-man security team to find the source, ordering them to fire immediately if they see a gaseous creature. The being appears and attacks two of the members of the security team, but Ensign Rizzo disobeys Kirk's order and does not fire his phaser; even as Kirk again orders Rizzo to fire, he just stands there and is also attacked, but is the lone survivor, dying in sickbay after being returned to the ship. The blood of all three victims is drained of hemoglobin. Fearing the killer to be a gaseous entity that he had encountered eleven years before while serving aboard the USS Farragut, Kirk neglects a rendezvous with the USS Yorktown to deliver an antiviral for Theta 7, instead hunting for the creature. When the Enterprise crew fails to find the creature using shipboard sensors, Kirk accompanies a second landing party with five security officers, again warning the men to fire full phasers. This time Garrovick does fire as ordered, but only after hesitating when the creature attacks. It drains hemoglobin out of two more crew members, the others being with Captain Kirk. Back on the ship, when Kirk learns that security officer Garrovick hesitated to fire his phaser upon the creature, he relieves the ensign of his duties and confines him to quarters.

Chief Medical Officer Dr. McCoy, having reviewed the records of Kirk's previous encounter, confronts the captain over his obsession with the gaseous Di-Kironium creature; as a young lieutenant, Kirk had hesitated in firing his own phaser at the creature, which subsequently killed half the Farragut crew, including Garrovick's father, who was the captain of that ship and Kirk's first service commander. Though given a commendation for bravery, Kirk continues to blame himself for their deaths. Kirk maintains that the creature poses an urgent threat, even yelling at Ensign Chekov.

Chekov interrupts a discussion being held by Spock and McCoy with Kirk in his quarters concerning his obsession with the creature to report that the cloud creature is moving away from the planet.

The Enterprise chases the creature at its maximum warp 8, but then reduces to warp 6 until it turns around and advances on the ship. Kirk orders the ship's phaser and photon torpedo weapons to fire, neither of which have effect. The creature then passes through the shields and into the ship's ventilation system. Spock points out to Kirk that, since the creature cannot be harmed with conventional weapons, the captain has nothing to regret about his earlier encounter. Determined to combat this illogical human guilt reaction, Spock is trying to convince Garrovick he did nothing wrong when the creature emerges through a damaged vent in Garrovick's room. Spock, after forcing Garrovick to leave, tries to shut it out, and is enveloped, but his copper-based green blood repels it. Realizing that neither he nor Garrovick could have harmed the creature, Kirk orders the ensign to return to duty.

The creature finally leaves the ship. Believing it to be heading to the Tycho system to spawn, Kirk and Garrovick beam down with an antimatter bomb. With the creature about to envelop them, Kirk and Garrovick beam away and the bomb explodes, annihilating the entity.

== Production ==
The writer, Art Wallace, noted that he based the story on Moby-Dick and series writer D. C. Fontana observed that it had similarities with the earlier episode, "The Doomsday Machine".

When director Ralph Senensky left to observe the Jewish holiday of Yom Kippur, producer John Meredyth Lucas took his place for a few hours, making this his directorial debut for the series. Later Lucas directed "The Ultimate Computer", "Elaan of Troyius", and "The Enterprise Incident".

"Lieutenant Lesley" played by regular Star Trek background actor Eddie Paskey is killed in this episode, however his character re-appears (and is referred to by name) in many subsequent episodes. Paskey was one of the core group of regular Star Trek extras and appeared in almost every episode, including the second pilot "Where No Man Has Gone Before", until he left the show in the middle of the third season.

== Reception ==
Zack Handlen of The A.V. Club gave the episode a "B" rating saying that Garrovick isn't important to the viewers, because this is the only episode in which he is seen, and that Kirk's "obsession" is a nice flaw to see in an otherwise too-perfect character.

In 2014, Gizmodo ranked "Obsession" as the 43rd-best episode of Star Trek, out of the over 700 episodes made by that time. They note it shows the dangers of an out-of-control captain, and that Kirk has become obsessed with getting revenge in this episode.

In 2009, GameRadar+ noted this episode for the deaths of crewmen during the away mission to the planet's surface.

In 2019, Nerdist included this episode on their "Best of Kirk" binge-watching guide.
