= Wolf in the Fold =

- Star Trek: The Original Series episode
- Episode no.: Season 2 Episode 14
- Directed by: Joseph Pevney
- Written by: Robert Bloch
- Cinematography by: Jerry Finnerman
- Production code: 036
- Original air date: December 22, 1967

Guest appearances
- John Winston – Lt. Kyle; John Fiedler – Administrator Hengist; Charles Macaulay – Prefect Jaris; Pilar Seurat – Sybo; Joseph Bernard – Tark; Charles Dierkop – Morla; Tanya Lemani (as Tania Lemani) – Kara; Judy McConnell – Yeoman Tankris; Virginia Aldridge – Lt. Karen Tracy; Judi Sherven – Nurse; Eddie Paskey – Lt. Leslie; William Blackburn – Lt. Hadley

Episode chronology
← Previous "Obsession"	Next → "The Trouble with Tribbles"
- Star Trek: The Original Series season 2

"Wolf in the Fold" is the fourteenth episode of the second season of the American science fiction television series Star Trek. Written by Robert Bloch and directed by Joseph Pevney, it was first broadcast on December 22, 1967.

In the episode, a series of horrific murders of women, on a world where such things never happen, points to Mr. Scott as the prime suspect.

== Plot ==
Captain Kirk, Chief Medical Officer Dr. McCoy, and Chief Engineer Montgomery Scott of the Federation starship USS Enterprise are enjoying therapeutic shore leave at a night club on planet Argelius II. Mr. Scott ("Scotty") is introduced to Kara, a dancer at the club, and leaves with her. As Kirk and McCoy make their way through an evening fog to another private club, they hear a scream, and find the dancer dead on the ground with Scotty standing against a nearby wall, clutching a bloody knife.

Scott is detained and interrogated by Mr. Hengist, an administrator from Rigel IV and head of Argelius's police operations. Jaris, the Prefect of the planet, appears and bids his wife, Sybo, employ the Argelian empathic contact to determine the truth. While she prepares for the ritual, Lieutenant Karen Tracy, an Enterprise medical specialist, beams down with a psycho-tricorder, interviews Scott, and is murdered. The evidence again points to Scott.

Sybo proceeds with the empathic contact ritual. The participants hold hands as in a seance, and Sybo begins to speak of a "monstrous, terrible evil", "a hunger that never dies", which has been named "Kesla", "Beratis", "Redjac." The altar fire goes out, and Sybo screams. When the lights come on, Scott is holding Sybo's dead body.

The Prefect, over Hengist's objections, agrees to continue the investigation aboard the Enterprise. Both Scott and Kara's fiancé Morla are questioned under "accuracy scan" by the computer, which confirms the testimony of both. Scott also speaks of a cold, evil presence during Sybo's ceremony, and the computer again verifies the accuracy of the statement.

Kirk queries the computer on the names spoken by Sybo, including "Redjac". The computer responds with "Red Jack", a name given to the serial killer better known as Jack the Ripper. That, and Sybo's mention of a "hunger that never dies", suggests to Kirk that an immortal, non-corporeal entity might be involved. "Beratis" is found to be the name of a serial killer on Rigel IV. Suspicion falls on Hengist, not least because the murder weapon was made on Rigel IV. Hengist attempts to flee, but Kirk punches him and apparently kills him. Maniacal laughter is then heard from the computer. Apparently, the entity has jumped from Hengist's body to the computer, from which it can control the ship.

The entity begins to threaten the crew to generate the fear it feeds on. Kirk orders Doctor McCoy to administer fast-acting tranquilizers to all hands, and Spock ties up the computer by ordering it to compute the value of pi to its last decimal place. After attempting to possess Jaris, the entity returns to the body of Hengist, which is immediately tranquilized. Kirk carries Hengist to the Transporter Room, where he is beamed into space at "maximum dispersion". Spock notes that the entity will survive only as separate bits of energy before perishing. He then suggests that the tranquilized crew resume their shore leave.

== Reception ==
Zack Handlen of The A.V. Club commented that "women are treated like a completely different species". A repeated point for denunciation is Spock's infamous remark that "women are more easily and more deeply terrified, generating more sheer horror than the male of the species."

Writing in 2010, Torie Atkinson objected to Kirk's demand for a "psycho-tricorder," which, McCoy says, "will give us a detailed account of everything that's happened to Mister Scott in the last twenty-four hours." Atkinson wrote, "Seriously? All this time they've had a piece of technology that reads and records memories, and they've been using these archaic court martials? [sic] Why ever investigate anything? This is easily the most ridiculous invention-of-the-week that Star Trek has thrown out there so far." However, she added that "it's nice to see Scotty front-and-center, and his abject terror at what's happening to him and crying over feeling powerless and dangerous were moving." She also "liked the humor—there are a lot of good one-liners (particularly McCoy's line about having drugs that could tranquilize an active volcano)" as well as "the idea of a murder mystery in the Star Trek universe."

Eugene Myers also "liked the idea of a classic murder mystery with Star Trek characters, complete with a locked room murder where the lights go out and someone screams." Myers wrote a negative review, although he admired some details, such as "the table lights used to show appreciation for a good performance, an interesting detail of an alien culture that was sadly lacking for the rest of the episode" and "the brief look at the foggy Argelian streets (purposefully evocative of Whitechapel?)." He concluded that "this episode feels like someone took some other plot and shoehorned Star Trek characters into it, which is pretty much what happened."

Reviewer Jeff Bond was mostly pleased with the episode:

Robert Bloch's "Wolf in the Fold" is typical both of the horror writer's contributions to the series (he also wrote What Are Little Girls Made Of? and Catspaw) and of the show's second season, in that in year two Trek often presented some fairly dark and outlandish plotlines but shook them up with humor ... All of Bloch's Star Trek scripts threw classic horror tropes into the unfamiliar territory of science fiction in clever ways ... and all three benefit from the creepy frisson of classic horror themes thrust into Trek's sci-fi setting."

Bond adds:

If you're planning on introducing your feminist girlfriend to Star Trek, "Wolf in the Fold" might not be the best starter episode — it's equivalent to a slasher film in the way women are presented almost exclusively as victims for a marauding monster ... That's compounded by the episode's jocular wrap-up in which the Enterprise's command crew of hound dogs are eager to put the brutal murders of a few female citizens and crewmembers behind them by getting back down to Argelius ... It's offensive in retrospect but "Wolf in the Fold" to my mind makes up for a multitude of sins when it veers off into black comedy territory late in the episode ... Hengist is a superb foil ... The offbeat idea of drugging the entire crew to keep the Redjack entity harmless really moves the story in an unexpected direction and conjures up what to my mind has always been the funniest line ever uttered on the original Star Trek: which comes when Kirk asks McCoy what the entity would do if it entered a tranquilized body, to which McCoy replies "Well, it might take up knitting, but nothing more harmful than that."

Melissa N. Hayes-Gehrke of the University of Maryland pointed out: "A conversation between Kirk and Spock informs us for the first time that when Starfleet members are on a planet, they are subject to the laws of that planet. This is a very interesting development, with repercussions throughout all of the Star Trek series." She also wrote: "This episode showcases Kirk's loyalty to his crewmen, as well as Kirk and Spock's synergy while engaging in completely random speculation."

Zach Handlen dismissed most of the story as not having "had enough drafts," saying that it "has its own strong idea; but what's so weird is the way that idea doesn't actually surface till the last ten minutes of the episode." He considered the strongest section to be when Redjac invades the computer: "Sure, the Enterprise computer's been screwed with before, but hearing a disembodied voice screaming for your death is très spooky; as is the vision of hell (or colored mist) we get in the computer display screens ... There are some clever bits that come out of dealing with a possessed ship." In 2014, Charlie Jane Anders at io9 ranked "Wolf in the Fold" as the 76th best episode of Star Trek in a list of the top 100 Star Trek episodes. In 2017, Heroes & Icons noted this episode as featuring scary Star Trek content, noting that it ties into the story of Jack the Ripper.
