= Friday's Child (Star Trek: The Original Series) =

- Star Trek: The Original Series episode
- Episode no.: Season 2 Episode 11
- Directed by: Joseph Pevney
- Written by: D. C. Fontana
- Cinematography by: Jerry Finnerman
- Production code: 032
- Original air date: December 1, 1967

Guest appearances
- Julie Newmar – Eleen; Michael Dante – Maab; Tige Andrews – Kras; Ben Gage – Akaar; Cal Bolder – Keel; Robert Bralver – Ens. Grant; Kirk Raymond – Duur; Eddie Paskey – Lt. Leslie; William Blackburn – Lt. Hadley; Walker Edmiston – Voice of SS Deirdre

Episode chronology
← Previous "Journey to Babel"	Next → "The Deadly Years"
- Star Trek: The Original Series season 2

"Friday's Child" is the eleventh episode of the second season of the American science fiction television series Star Trek. Written by D.C. Fontana and directed by Joseph Pevney, it was first broadcast December 1, 1967.

In the episode, the crew of the Enterprise become entangled in a planet's tribal power struggle. Adding to their difficulty is the presence of the Klingons, and a woman (Julie Newmar) who does not want her unborn child.

The episode's title is derived from a traditional English poem, known as "Monday's Child". The reference is to a line in the 1887 Harper's Weekly version of the poem: "Friday's child is full of woe."

== Plot ==
The USS Enterprise, under the command of Captain Kirk, arrives at Capella IV to negotiate a mining contract for a valuable mineral. The Capellans are violent and warlike, but scrupulously honest. Kirk beams down to the planet with Dr. McCoy, First Officer Spock and a security officer; they find that Kras, a Klingon emissary, is already present. The Capellans order Kirk and his party to hand over their weapons as the Klingon has done, and despite killing Kirk's security escort for drawing a weapon on the Klingon, treat the party as honored guests.

The Capellans' leader, Akaar, favors the Federation's offer over that of the Klingons. However, another Capellan named Maab challenges his leadership. Fighting breaks out among the Capellans and Maab kills Akaar, winning the title of Teer (leader) for himself. He orders the death of Eleen, Akaar's pregnant wife, because her unborn child represents competition to Maab's rule. Kirk, Spock, and McCoy manage to escape with Eleen into some nearby hills. While a party of Capellans pursue them, McCoy is determined to assist with Eleen's pregnancy, despite her culture's prohibition against physical contact with a Teer's wife. He succeeds in winning her cooperation, but she cannot reconcile herself to bearing the child, who in her culture would belong to no one. McCoy tells her to repeat the words "the child is mine", but she misinterprets this, thinking McCoy is claiming the child as his own. The delivery is successful, but Kirk is unable to reach Enterprise using their communicators because the starship has been drawn away by a false distress call.

The Capellans arrive and Eleen escapes to surrender to Maab, claiming that she killed the humans. When Kras questions her story, he pulls out a Federation phaser that he had retrieved earlier and threatens everyone. Maab sacrifices himself to draw Kras's fire, and a Capellan warrior kills the Klingon. A team from Enterprise appears and prevents further violence. Back on Enterprise, it is revealed that Eleen, acting as her son's regent, has authorized the mining agreement with the Federation and that the child has been named Leonard James Akaar. Because of this, Spock predicts that Kirk and McCoy will be "insufferably pleased" with themselves "for at least a month".

== Production and reception ==
Writer D.C. Fontana said she wanted a story about a strong woman who did not necessarily want children. Her original idea was used largely unchanged, with the major exception being the addition of the Klingons.

Zach Handlen of The A.V. Club gave the episode a "B+", praising it for giving McCoy a stronger presence and better lines.
