= Journey to Babel =

- Star Trek: The Original Series episode
- A toast to the ambassadors
- Episode no.: Season 2 Episode 10
- Directed by: Joseph Pevney
- Written by: D. C. Fontana
- Cinematography by: Jerry Finnerman
- Production code: 044
- Original air date: November 17, 1967

Guest appearances
- Mark Lenard – Ambassador Sarek; Jane Wyatt – Amanda; John Wheeler – Ambassador Gav; Reggie Nalder – Shras; William O'Connell – Thelev; Billy Curtis – Small Copper-Skinned Ambassador; James X. Mitchell – Josephs; Frank da Vinci – Vulcan Aide; William Blackburn – Lt. Hadley

Episode chronology
← Previous "Metamorphosis"	Next → "Friday's Child"
- Star Trek: The Original Series season 2

"Journey to Babel" is the tenth episode of the second season of the American science fiction television series Star Trek. Written by D. C. Fontana and directed by Joseph Pevney, it was first broadcast on November 17, 1967.

In the episode, Enterprise is tasked with transporting dignitaries to a diplomatic conference.

The episode features the first appearance of Sarek (Mark Lenard) and Amanda (Jane Wyatt), the parents of Spock, and also introduces two new species, the Andorians and the Tellarites.

== Plot ==
Enterprise, under the command of Captain Kirk, is transporting Federation ambassadors to a conference on the planet Babel to discuss the admission of the Coridan system into the Federation. The system is a prime source of dilithium crystals, but is underpopulated and unprotected, a situation some would prefer to maintain by keeping Coridan out of the Federation.

Sarek, who is a Vulcan ambassador, boards the ship with his human wife Amanda, ignoring Spock's greeting. Captain Kirk learns that Sarek is in fact Spock's father, now estranged because he had disapproved of his son's decision to join Starfleet rather than attend the Vulcan Science Academy.

During a reception for the passengers, the Tellarite ambassador, Gav, demands to know Sarek's position on Coridan. Pushed for a response, Sarek refers to the need to protect Coridan from unauthorized mining operations, with which Tellarite ships have been involved. Gav takes offense at the allegation and the confrontation briefly becomes physical before Kirk intervenes, warning all parties to keep order on his ship.

Meanwhile, Communications Officer Lt. Uhura has detected an encoded transmission beamed from Enterprise to a fast-moving vessel at the extreme edge of sensor range. Shortly afterward, Ambassador Gav is found murdered, his neck broken by what Spock describes as an ancient Vulcan method of execution called Tal-Shaya, casting suspicion on Sarek. During questioning, Sarek suffers a cardiovascular event, and is rushed to the sickbay, where Chief Medical Officer McCoy determines that he requires immediate surgery. Because there is a shortage of his rare T-negative-type blood, Spock volunteers to donate some of his own blood for the operation, using an experimental stimulant for increased blood production.

Plans for the procedure come to a halt when Thelev, a member of the Andorian delegation, stabs Captain Kirk. Kirk subdues Thelev but is seriously wounded and taken to Sickbay, while Thelev is imprisoned in the brig. In accordance with regulations, and despite Amanda's emotional plea, Spock refuses to serve as the blood donor and turn command of Enterprise over to another officer, as the situation is too critical and command regulations are silent on the matter of personal privilege.

Hearing of Spock's refusal to relinquish command, and having recovered sufficiently to be able to walk, Kirk returns to the bridge to relieve Spock and order him to Sickbay, intending to turn command over to Mr. Scott and then hide out in his quarters until the operation is completed. When Uhura picks up another encoded transmission from inside Enterprise and traces the source to the brig, Kirk decides to stay on the bridge. When Thelev is searched, it is discovered that one of his antennae is fake and conceals a small transceiver.

The unidentified vessel closes in and attacks, moving too quickly for Enterprise to lock on with phasers. The ship takes several hits from the attacking vessel. McCoy begins the operation on Sarek, who is receiving blood directly from Spock. Kirk orders Thelev brought to the bridge and questions him about himself and the attacking ship; Thelev is unresponsive. Kirk decides on a ruse, shutting down internal power to make Enterprise appear crippled. The attacker approaches and drops to sublight speed, and Enterprise damages it with a surprise phaser attack. The disabled ship self-destructs. Thelev reveals that both he and the ship were on suicide missions; he then collapses and dies from a delayed-action poison.

Kirk returns to Sickbay for further care and finds Spock and Sarek both alert, the surgery an apparent success. Spock speculates that Thelev and the attacking ship were of Orion origin, and the speed and power of the latter were consistent with a suicide mission, with all energy dedicated to attack. Thelev's mission aboard Enterprise, Kirk and Spock presume, was to sow distrust among the Federation members and weaken Enterprise prior to the attack. In support of this theory is the fact that Orion has been raiding Coridan, and would profit by selling dilithium to both sides in a war. Amanda asks Sarek to thank Spock for saving his life, but Sarek shrugs and says that it was only logical. Amanda expresses anger at this harping on logic, and Spock, noting his mother's exasperation, asks Sarek why he married her. Sarek replies, "At the time, it seemed the logical thing to do," and offers Amanda his hand in a ritual gesture of affection. McCoy then firmly orders Kirk and Spock to remain quietly in bed, finally getting the last word.

== Production ==
Wyatt had been widely known for the 1950s sitcom Father Knows Best, where she played Elinor Donahue's mother. The episode which first aired the week prior to this episode, "Metamorphosis", featured Donahue as a guest actor, playing Commissioner Nancy Hedford, who became Zefram Cochrane's "Companion."

This episode introduced the Andorian and Tellarite species. John Wheeler, the actor who played the Tellarite ambassador, Gav, had difficulty seeing through the eye holes in his prosthetic makeup and was forced to raise his head in a seemingly arrogant manner in order to see the other actors. The Andorian antennae (sprouting out of the back of the head in this and other episodes of the original series) were depicted in the later Star Trek: Enterprise series as coming out of the forehead and capable of movement.

== Reception ==
In 1996, for the franchise's 30th anniversary, TV Guide ranked "Journey to Babel" No. 5 on its list of the 10 best Star Trek episodes.

Io9's 2014 listing of the top 100 Star Trek episodes placed "Journey to Babel" as the 39th best episode of all series up to that time, out of over 700 episodes; they noted this episode introduces Spock's parents and has a focus on diplomacy.

In 2015, SyFy ranked this episode as one of the top ten essential Star Trek original series Spock episodes. The next year, they also ranked guest stars Mark Lenard, as Sarek, and Jane Wyatt, as Amanda, as the third best guest stars on the original series.

In 2016, The Hollywood Reporter rated "Journey to Babel" as the 15th best episode of the original series. The episode introduced Spock's parents, Sarek and Amanda, who never again appeared in the series, but became major characters across the Star Trek franchise. Sarek is the father of Spock's half-brother Sybok (introduced in Star Trek V: The Final Frontier), and both adopted Michael Burnham (introduced in Star Trek: Discovery) as an older sister to Spock.

In 2016, The Washington Post ranked this episode the ninth best live-action episode of the Star Trek franchise, citing "the tricky politics" of Spock's family, the Federation politics, and Mark Lenard's performance as Sarek.

In 2016, Business Insider ranked "Journey to Babel" the 7th best episode of the original series.

In 2016, Newsweek ranked "Journey to Babel" as one of the best episodes of the original series. They note the episode features the Star Trek franchise aliens, Vulcans, Andorians, and Tellarites in additions to humans going to a space conference. They note the episode is a sort of teaching moment, about the Federation, politics, and Spock's relationship with his parents.

In 2016, Vox rated this one of the top 25 essential episodes of all Star Trek.

In 2017, Inverse recommended "Journey to Babel" as "essential watching" for Star Trek: Discovery.

In 2019, Nerdist included this episode on their "Best of Spock" binge-watching guide.

In 2020, ScreenRant ranked this the 8th best episode of the original series (TOS), praising it for having "a bit of everything that makes TOS great. Creative and interesting aliens, political tension and resolution, personal drama, and high-stakes adventure."

In 2021, CBR said that "Journey to Babel" was an "essential episode" of the original series, stating, "'Journey to Babel' brings the action, drama and fun in an excellent showcase of what the series is capable of," and noting the two interesting plots: one of political intrigue and another of father-son relationship.

== See also ==
- "Babel One", an episode of Star Trek: Enterprise.
- "The Pirates of Orion", an episode of Star Trek: The Animated Series which references the Babel conference and planet Coridan.
