= The Ultimate Computer =

- Star Trek: The Original Series episode
- Episode no.: Season 2 Episode 24
- Directed by: John Meredyth Lucas
- Story by: Laurence N. Wolfe
- Teleplay by: D. C. Fontana
- Cinematography by: Jerry Finnerman
- Production code: 053
- Original air date: March 8, 1968

Guest appearances
- Barry Russo – Commodore Robert Wesley; William Marshall – Dr. Richard Daystrom; Sean Morgan – Ensign Harper; Frank da Vinci – Lt. Brent; Eddie Paskey – Lt. Leslie; William Blackburn – Lt. Hadley; Roger Holloway – Lt. Lemli

Episode chronology
← Previous "The Omega Glory"	Next → "Bread and Circuses"
- Star Trek: The Original Series season 2

"The Ultimate Computer" is the twenty-fourth episode of the second season of the American science fiction television series Star Trek. Written by D.C. Fontana (based on a story by Laurence N. Wolfe) and directed by John Meredyth Lucas, it was first broadcast on March 8, 1968.

In the episode, the crew of the Enterprise race to disable a rogue computer in total control of the ship.

== Plot ==
The Federation starship Enterprise is summoned to a space station without explanation. Commodore Wesley (Barry Russo) explains that the Enterprise will be a test vessel for the M-5 Multitronic System, a revolutionary tactical and control computer designed by Dr. Richard Daystrom (William Marshall). The M-5 is to handle all ship functions without human assistance. While Science Officer Spock is impressed with M-5, Captain Kirk and Chief Medical Officer Dr. McCoy have doubts.

The M-5 succeeds at its first tasks, performing ship functions more quickly and efficiently than a living crew. However, M-5 also exhibits unexpected behavior, such as turning off power and life support to unoccupied parts of the ship, and drawing increased power for unknown reasons; Daystrom maintains M-5 is working properly and is simply cutting power to unnecessary areas. Spock and Kirk engage in a discussion about whether Spock would prefer to serve under a computer or Kirk.

In its first tactical drill, M-5 defends the Enterprise against mock attacks from Starships Excalibur and Lexington. The Enterprise is declared the victor, and Wesley jokingly refers to Kirk as "Captain Dunsel", employing a Starfleet Academy slang term for a part serving no useful purpose. Kirk is troubled by this.

Some time later, M-5 detects the Woden, an unmanned freighter, and unexpectedly diverts course and attacks with live torpedoes, destroying it. Kirk orders M-5 taken offline, but on attempting to do so, finds it protected by a powerful force field. Chief Engineer Scott orders Ensign Harper to disconnect its power source, but the M-5 creates a direct connection to the ship's warp engines, vaporizing Harper in the process. Spock and Scott attempt a manual override, but discover that the M-5 has rerouted all controls. Spock questions Daystrom on his computer design, and Daystrom reveals that he has imprinted human engrams onto M-5's circuits, creating what amounts to a human mind operating at the speed of a computer.

Meanwhile, four of Enterprise's sister ships, Lexington, Potemkin, Excalibur, and Hood, approach to begin a new tactical drill. Since M-5 has disabled communications, Kirk is unable to warn M-5's targets. M-5 detects the ships, and attacks them with its weapons at full power. The crew watches helplessly as the Enterprise fires on the Lexington, killing 53, and then turns to the Excalibur, killing all aboard and leaving her adrift. Commodore Wesley assumes that Kirk himself is responsible for the attacks, and requests permission from Starfleet Command to destroy the Enterprise.

Daystrom, having indicated that the engrams he used were his own, believes he can reason with the M-5, but his conversation with the unit quickly degenerates into a self-pitying lament over his own career disappointments. McCoy warns Kirk that he sees a nervous breakdown coming, and as Daystrom begins loudly to proclaim his and his creation's invincibility, Spock subdues him with a Vulcan nerve pinch.

Kirk then tries to persuade the M-5 to stop its attacks. The M-5 acknowledges Kirk, who asks M-5 what its purpose is. M-5 responds that its purpose is to protect lives. Kirk argues that it acted contrary to its purpose by murdering people. M-5 acknowledges that it has committed murder and must therefore die, and shuts itself down. In so doing, it also cripples the Enterprise.

Having received permission to destroy Enterprise, the other Federation ships close in. Since Scott is unable to restore communications immediately, Kirk decides to allow the ship to drift with shields down, hoping that Commodore Wesley will realize that the threat has passed. The gamble pays off as the Commodore orders his ships to stand down at the last moment. Spock reminds Kirk and McCoy that while computers are more efficient, they are not any better.

== Production and reception ==
In 2011, this episode was noted by Forbes as one of the top ten episodes of the franchise that explores the implications of advanced technology, in particular the danger of A.I. In 2016, SyFy ranked guest star William Marshall's performance as Dr. Daystrom as the 14th best guest star on the original series.

The original draft was given to Ray Bradbury by mathematician and Star Trek fan Laurence Wolfe to give to Gene Roddenberry.

Michelle Erica Green of Trek Today maintains that it is one of McCoy's best episodes and praises the episode for taking place entirely on the Enterprise. She states that the M-5 turns out to be one of Trek's best villains.

== See also ==
- AI alignment
- 2001: A Space Odyssey
  - HAL 9000
