= Eddie Paskey =

American actor (1939–2021)

- Eddie Paskey as Lt. Leslie in Star Trek
- Born: Edward J. Paskey; August 20, 1939; Delaware, U.S.
- Died: August 17, 2021 (aged 81)
- Occupation: Actor
- Spouse: Judy Paskey
- Children: 4

Edward J. Paskey (August 20, 1939 – August 17, 2021) was an American actor. He was best known for playing Lieutenant Leslie on the television series Star Trek from 1966 to 1968.

== Early life ==
Paskey was born in a small farming town in Delaware but was raised in California. He moved with his family to Santa Monica in 1952. In his youth he was immersed in automobiles by working at his father's garage, and developed an interest in hot rods from a young age. His first car was a 1941 Ford coupe but was later replaced by a 1955 Ford Thunderbird that he purchased while earning $1.25 per hour.

== Career ==
Paskey's first credited television role was in the drama Ben Casey (1966) after meeting series producer Irving Elman while working at a service station in Pacific Palisades. In it he was credited as "Policeman." For the next five or six years he continued to act while working at the service station on weekends. He appeared on The Dick Van Dyke Show, Mission: Impossible in the 1966 pilot episode and in the 1966 episode "The Ransom," The Lucy Show, Twelve O'Clock High, The Wild Wild West and Please Don't Eat the Daisies. He also appeared in uncredited roles in the films What Did You Do in the War, Daddy? and Mister Buddwing.

== Star Trek: The Original Series ==
Paskey first appeared on Star Trek as a "crewman" on the second pilot episode "Where No Man Has Gone Before," and was first identified by name in "Mudd's Women" in an early scene where Doctor McCoy refers to him as Connors. In subsequent episodes, he was cast regularly as a crewman, but also appeared as a security officer, a helmsman, an engineer station officer, even an alien, all to create a sense of continuity on Star Trek during the series' run. Paskey had scripted lines in four episodes and was credited in two. His character, Mr. Leslie, appeared in more episodes than principal characters Sulu or Chekov. William Shatner gave the character the name Leslie after his eldest daughter. To pay homage to the character of Leslie, a fan based website created an 8" action figure in Paskey's likeness.

Paskey credits the longevity of his character to his sense of caution. Since he was on the set most of the time and knew the script well, he made sure that he was always elsewhere when an episode called for someone to die. When his character does die in the episode "Obsession," Paskey explains his mysterious return in the next episode by describing a lost scene in the script, where Dr. McCoy administered a miracle potion that saves Leslie's life. Paskey mentioned that this scene was never filmed. Episode director Ralph Senesky also confirmed that he did not film it.

In "This Side of Paradise" his is the only character to mutiny openly against his superior, Captain Kirk, and even disobeys orders again in "And the Children Shall Lead," although under an alien influence. In "The City on the Edge of Forever," Paskey was the driver of the truck in the scene where character Edith Keeler (Joan Collins) is struck down and killed.

Paskey also appeared occasionally as a stand-in for Shatner in certain long scenes. He was the hand-double for James Doohan, who was missing a finger, in "Wolf in the Fold" and "That Which Survives." He appeared in most of the episodes from the first two seasons of the original series. A bad back and cluster headaches from an old injury, which worsened from the set lighting, led to his leaving the show in the third season. Paskey admitted in a July 1988 Starlog Magazine interview that once the pain had gone, he tried to return to acting but had lost many of his Hollywood contacts while working on Star Trek, and eventually retired from the profession.

=== Appearances ===
No.	Episode name	Role	Talks	Credit	Remarks
1	The Man Trap	Lt. Ryan	no	no	in prologue bridge scene as helmsman Ryan; later as unnamed medical assistant in sickbay after Spock is attacked
2	Charlie X	crewman	no	no	seen among other crewmembers in the rec room while Uhura is performing a song
3	Where No Man Has Gone Before	crewman	no	no	seen behind Kirk and Spock while they engage in Tri-D Chess; brig guard on Delta Vega
4	The Naked Time	Lt. Ryan	yes	no	escorted, for being drunk, away from bridge station seen in red shirt as navigator
5	The Enemy Within	crewman	no	no	on planet freezing along with Sulu and the landing party unable to beam up
6	Mudd's Women	Conners	no	no	caught, and reproached by Dr. McCoy, for ogling Ruth Bonaventure
7	What Are Little Girls Made Of?	crewman	no	no	as bridge engineer
9	Dagger of the Mind	crewman	no	no	as bridge engineer & wayward eavesdropper
10	The Corbomite Maneuver	crewman	no	no	as bridge engineer, also seen on the lower decks
11	The Menagerie, part 1	crewman	no	no	as bridge engineer, he witnesses Spock's arrest
13	The Conscience of the King	Lt. Leslie	yes	no	as helmsman, without rank insignia
14	Balance of Terror	Mr. Leslie	no	no	as bridge engineer
15	Shore Leave	Mr. Leslie	no	no	as helmsman in opening prologue only
16	The Galileo Seven	crewman	no	no	on bridge and in transporter room, always faceless
17	The Squire of Gothos	Lt. Leslie	no	no	in captain's seat, now with Lt's. insignia
18	Arena	Lt. Leslie	no	no	as bridge engineer
19	Tomorrow is Yesterday	Lt. Leslie	no	no	as bridge engineer
21	The Return of the Archons	Lt. Leslie	no	no	joins landing party, seen being awakened by Kirk
22	Space Seed	Lt. Leslie	no	no	dines at "Welcome to the 23rd Century" dinner for Khan
24	This Side of Paradise	Lt. Leslie	yes	yes	as "crewman", first time Leslie disobeys Kirk's orders, by mutinying
25	The Devil in the Dark	Lt. Leslie	no	no	as security officer, later a possible horta target
27	The Alternative Factor	Lt. Leslie	yes	yes	as "Lesley"; helmsman, later in command seat at beginning of epilogue
28	The City on the Edge of Forever	Lt. Leslie	no	no	as science officer
29	Operation -- Annihilate!	Lt. Leslie	no	no	as transporter chief, gets Vulcan nerve pinch
30	Amok Time	Lt. Leslie	no	no	as bridge engineer and medical assistant
31	Who Mourns for Adonais?	Lt. Leslie	no	no	Sulu and Leslie scan for Apollo's power source
32	The Changeling	Lt. Leslie	no	no	as navigator wearing braided yellow command shirt
33	Mirror, Mirror	Lt. Leslie	no	no	briefly in prologue and epilogue
34	The Apple	Lt. Leslie	no	no	as bridge engineer
35	The Doomsday Machine	Lt. Leslie	yes	no	as bridge engineer
36	Catspaw	Lt. Leslie	no	no	as bridge engineer and as helmsman
38	Metamorphosis	Lt. Leslie	no	no	with Scotty when Kirk checks in
39	Journey to Babel	Lt. Leslie	no	no	as bridge engineer
40	Friday's Child	Lt. Leslie	no	no	as bridge engineer
41	The Deadly Years	Lt. Leslie	no	no	as bridge engineer
42	Obsession	Lt. Leslie	no	no	"dies" in cloud creature attack, by asphyxiation; revived in unfilmed scene when Dr. McCoy administers a life saving injection
43	Wolf in the Fold	Lt. Leslie	no	no	on bridge, gets tranquilized along with crew
44	The Trouble with Tribbles	Lt. Leslie	no	no	bridge and security; adopts a tribble from Uhura
45	The Gamesters of Triskelion	Lt. Leslie	no	no	as bridge engineer and as science officer
46	A Piece of the Action	Lt. Leslie	no	no	as bridge engineer
47	The Immunity Syndrome	Lt. Leslie	no	no	also security officer in transporter room, later a "yellowshirt" on lower decks
48	A Private Little War	Lt. Leslie	no	no	as bridge engineer
49	Return to Tomorrow	Lt. Leslie	no	no	also as security officer in transporter room
50	Patterns of Force	Ekosian	no	no	as Nazi officer; also a second character with mustache
51	By Any Other Name	Lt. Leslie	no	no	dehydrated into a polyhedron
52	The Omega Glory	Lt. Leslie	no	no	on Bridge; and as a guard, arresting Tracy
53	The Ultimate Computer	Lt. Leslie	no	no	escorts a stunned Dr. Daystrom to sickbay along with another security officer
54	Bread and Circuses	Lt. Leslie	no	no	
55	Assignment: Earth	Lt. Leslie	no	no	stunned by Gary Seven. Leslie actually appears wearing a red-shirt, later a gold shirt.
57	The Enterprise Incident	Lt. Leslie	no	no	a most happy Leslie, when seeing that Kirk is alive
59	And the Children Shall Lead	Lt. Leslie	no	no	second episode where Leslie disobeys Kirk's direct orders
60	Is There in Truth No Beauty?	Lt. Leslie	no	no	as security officer
61	Spectre of the Gun	Lt. Leslie	no	no	as bridge engineer, prologue only
68	Elaan of Troyius	Lt. Leslie	no	no	kindly offered his seat to the Dohlman, even though he needed it to work

== Deep Space Nine ==
No.	Episode name	Role	Talks	Credit	Remarks
503	Trials and Tribble-ations	Lt. Leslie	no	no	in footage incorporated from The Trouble with Tribbles, as a security officer

== Star Trek: New Voyages ==
In 2004, he appeared in the Star Trek: New Voyages episode "Come What May" as Admiral Leslie, a character established as Lieutenant Leslie's father.

== Later years ==
After retiring from acting, Paskey went into business for himself in Santa Ana, California, owning and operating an auto-detailing service called The Air Shop with his wife Judy. He sold the business in 2004. He and his wife were members of Hot Rods Unlimited, a Southern California auto club. They have four children.

Paskey admitted that he considered auditioning for Star Trek: The Motion Picture (1979) but later reconsidered. He remained a fan of the film series but not the television follow-up Star Trek: The Next Generation, as he explained that "he went to sleep on it".

Paskey died on August 17, 2021, three days before his 82nd birthday.
