= The Alternative Factor =

- Star Trek: The Original Series episode
- Episode no.: Season 1 Episode 27
- Directed by: Gerd Oswald
- Written by: Don Ingalls
- Cinematography by: Jerry Finnerman
- Production code: 020
- Original air date: March 30, 1967

Guest appearances
- Robert Brown – Lazarus; Janet MacLachlan – Lt. Charlene Masters; Richard Derr – Commodore Barstow; Christian Patrick – Transporter Chief; Arch Whiting – Assistant Engineer; Tom Lupo – Security Guard; Ron Veto – Security Guard; Vince Cadiente – Security Guard; Eddie Paskey – Lt. Lesley

Episode chronology
← Previous "Errand of Mercy"	Next → "The City on the Edge of Forever"
- Star Trek: The Original Series season 1

"The Alternative Factor" is the twenty-seventh episode of the first season of the American science fiction television series Star Trek. Written by Don Ingalls and directed by Gerd Oswald, it first aired on March 30, 1967.

In the episode, the crew of the USS Enterprise encounters a "reality jumping" madman. It is the first Star Trek episode to deal with a parallel universe.

== Plot ==
The USS Enterprise is rocked by an energy pulse. Science Officer Spock informs Captain Kirk that the gravity pull of the planet fluctuated to zero and the surrounding space momentarily "winked" out of existence. Sensors locate a human presence on the planet that was not there before. Spock and Kirk beam down to the planet and find a one-man spacecraft. A disheveled man named Lazarus appears and slips off a cliff. He is injured, and Kirk has him beamed to the Enterprise for examination.

Back on the ship, Lt. Masters informs Captain Kirk that the mysterious disturbance has drained the dilithium crystals in the warp drive. A message from Starfleet reports that every quadrant has been subjected to the same winking effect and electronic disruption. Starfleet fears that the disruption may be a prelude to an invasion and has ordered all ships except the Enterprise to leave the area. Kirk is ordered to find the cause of the disturbance.

Lazarus periodically fades in and out of the universe, encountering a lookalike enemy in a "dimensional corridor", creating an energy wink. Spock reports a "rip" in space and time on the planet. Lazarus says his enemy, trying to destroy the universe, is causing the phenomenon. Lazarus demands dilithium crystals so he may fix his ship and continue to fight his enemy. Kirk refuses. Lazarus steals dilithium from the Enterprise and is caught. Lazarus denies the theft and blames it on his nemesis.

Kirk beams back to the planet with Lazarus and a security team to seek this enemy. Lazarus has another dimensional corridor episode and is returned to sickbay. Lazarus explains to Kirk that he is a time traveler; his spaceship is actually a "dimensional corridor gateway"; and the planet below was once his home world. Lazarus claims his enemy destroyed his civilization in the past, for which Lazarus has chased him for centuries. Kirk is puzzled by Lazarus "leaping" in this universe—one minute he is wounded and insane; the next minute he is strong and rational. Both Kirk and Spock realize the answer is that Lazarus is actually two different beings—one (this universe) insane and the other (anti-matter universe) rational. Kirk and Mr. Spock develop a hypothesis that Lazarus's enemy is his counterpart from an anti-matter universe. If he and his anti-self contact each other within either physical universe outside the dimensional corridor, they would annihilate both the matter and anti-matter universes.

Lazarus slips away from sickbay and creates a diversion in engineering to acquire dilithium. With the stolen crystals, he beams down to the planet to repair his ship. Kirk follows, but the time machine activates just as Kirk enters the ship. Kirk is teleported to the anti-matter universe, where he meets the Anti-Lazarus. The Anti-Lazarus admits to stealing the Enterprise's dilithium to prevent his doppelganger from using it to invade the anti-matter universe outside the dimensional corridor. He informs Kirk that his people believed two universes existed, and when his matter counterpart learned about it, he went insane and became obsessed with destroying his doppelganger. He tells Kirk that only by destroying Lazarus' ship (which would also destroy Anti-Lazarus' ship) while the two Lazaruses are inside the "negative magnetic" dimensional corridor which links the two universes can both universes be saved. Kirk states that the destruction of the ships, which are portals, would trap the two Lazaruses in the corridor "throughout time".

Kirk confronts the matter Lazarus, and pushes him into the dimensional door. Kirk heads back to the Enterprise, ordering the ship's phasers to target the dimension ship. The two Lazaruses meet once more and fight inside the dimensional corridor as phaser beams vaporize the ship/gateway between the universes. On ship Kirk muses that although the universes are safe "for you and me", the two Lazaruses are trapped forever: "But what of Lazarus... what of Lazarus?"

== Production ==
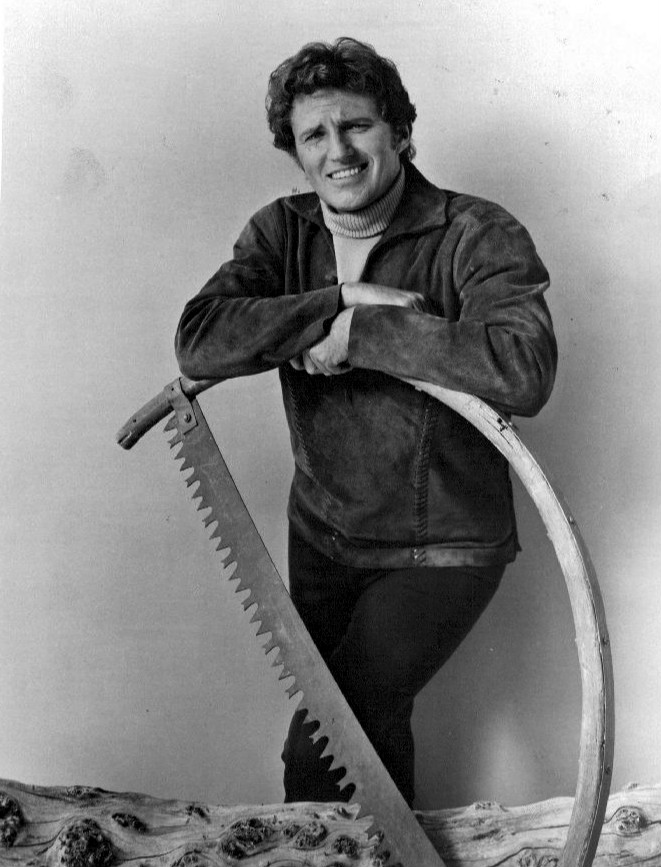
Robert Brown (1969 photograph) played Lazarus

John Drew Barrymore was cast as Lazarus, but failed to show up for filming, without explanation. The part was quickly recast with Robert Brown. The producers filed a grievance with the Screen Actors Guild, which suspended Barrymore's membership for six months, preventing him from working as an actor during that time.

The special effects for the extra-dimensional "winking" episodes were achieved by superimposing a moving photograph of the Trifid Nebula over the action.

== Reception ==
Zack Handlen of The A.V. Club, 42 years after its initial debut, gave the episode a 'C−' rating, describing the plot as "baffling", "unrewarding" and poorly paced. A ranking of every episode of the original series by Hollywood.com placed this episode 77th out of 79 episodes.

In 2017, Den of Geek ranked this episode as the 6th worst Star Trek episode of the original series.

In 2016, CNET ranked "The Alternative Factor" as the ninth worst episode of all Star Trek, based on rankings between an audience and discussion hosts at a 50th anniversary Star Trek convention in Las Vegas.
