= D. C. Fontana =

American screenwriter (1939–2019)

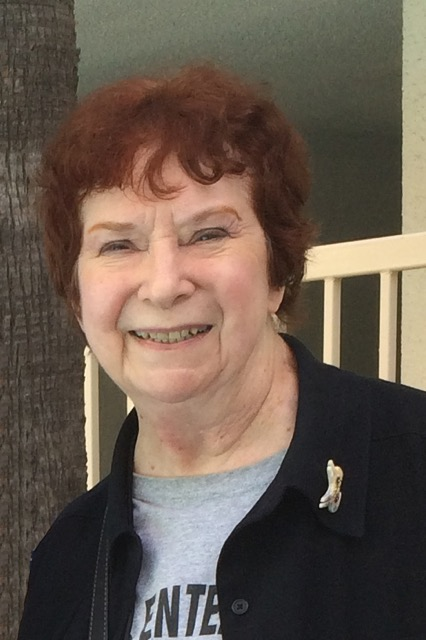
- Fontana in 2016
- Born: March 25, 1939; Sussex, New Jersey, U.S.
- Died: December 2, 2019 (aged 80); Los Angeles, California, U.S.
- Other names: J. Michael Bingham; Michael Richards
- Education: Fairleigh Dickinson University
- Occupations: Scriptwriter, story editor
- Years active: 1960–2006
- Spouse: Dennis Skotak (m. 1981)

Dorothy Catherine Fontana (March 25, 1939 – December 2, 2019) was an American television script writer and story editor, best known for her work on the original Star Trek series.

After a short period working for Samuel A. Peeples as a secretary, Fontana moved to work for Del Reisman, a producer on The Lieutenant, whose creator was Gene Roddenberry. Though The Lieutenant was soon cancelled, Roddenberry began working on Star Trek, and Fontana was appointed as the series' story editor, but left after the second season to pursue freelance work. She later worked with Roddenberry again on Genesis II and then as story editor and associate producer on Star Trek: The Animated Series. During the 1970s and early 1980s, she worked on a number of television shows including The Streets of San Francisco, Bonanza, The Six Million Dollar Man, Logan's Run, The Waltons, and Dallas.

Roddenberry hired Fontana to work on Star Trek: The Next Generation, but, while she was given an associate producer credit, the experience soured their relationship and resulted in a claim put to the Writers Guild of America. She later wrote an episode of Star Trek: Deep Space Nine and an episode of the Star Trek fan-made series Star Trek: New Voyages.

Fontana was inducted into the Museum of Pop Culture's Science Fiction and Fantasy Hall of Fame. She was also awarded the Morgan Cox Award in 2002 by the Writers Guild of America, and was twice named to the American Screenwriters Association's hall of fame.

== Early life ==
Born in Sussex, New Jersey, Fontana was raised in Totowa, New Jersey, graduating from Passaic Valley Regional High School in 1957.

Fontana decided at the age of 11 that she wanted to become a novelist. During her youth, she wrote horror stories featuring herself and her friends. She attended Fairleigh Dickinson University, where she graduated with an associate degree as an Executive Secretarial major. After she graduated from college, she went to New York City, where she got a job working at Screen Gems as the junior secretary to the president of the studio. Shortly after his death, she returned to her home state briefly then moved to Los Angeles. She gained employment in the typing pool at Revue Studios, working as the secretary to writer Samuel A. Peeples during his time on the Western television series Overland Trail.

When the series was canceled, Peeples and Fontana moved on to The Tall Man, and Fontana sold Peeples a story called "A Bounty for Billy". She was 21; it was her first story sale. She continued to work with Peeples on the western television series Frontier Circus. During her work with Peeples, she sold six story ideas, including one on Shotgun Slade for Nat Holt. She was restricted in that particular episode, since the series only allowed for four main speaking roles including the main character. Another episode on which she worked had to be re-written to remove any outside scenes, as it was raining during the shoot, which could not be delayed for the weather to change. These were all created under the name of Dorothy C. Fontana. Peeples moved on from the company, but Fontana stayed and returned to the typing pool.

== Story editing ==
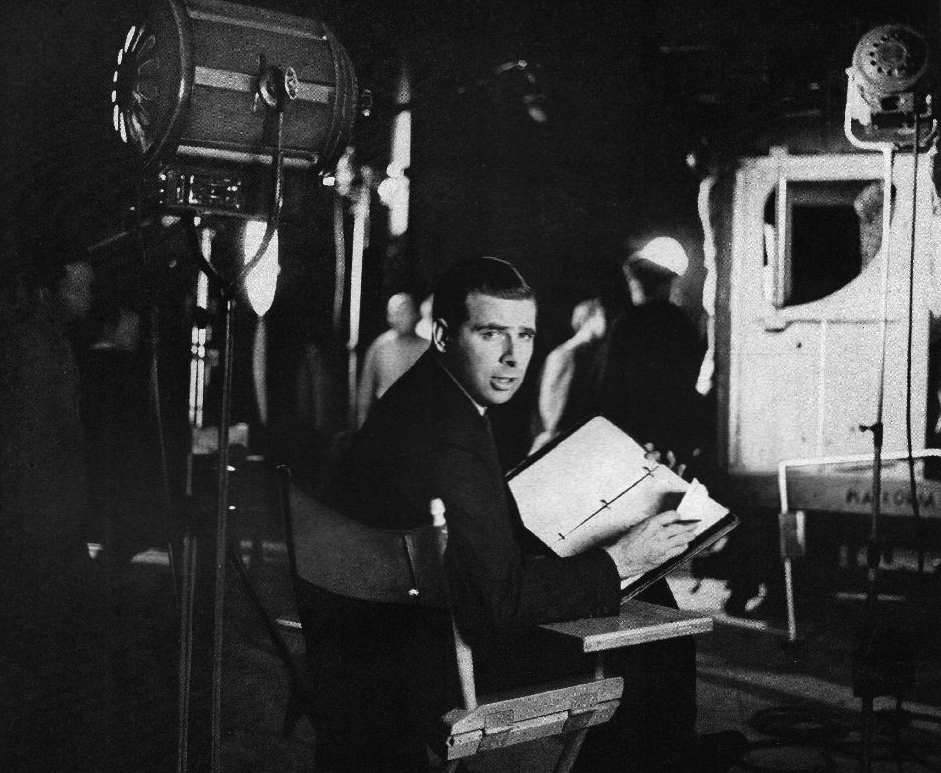
Fontana started working for Gene Roddenberry while covering his secretary's sick leave

Fontana noticed an opening for a position on a Marine Corps-based series called The Lieutenant and applied; Fontana began working as a secretary for producer Del Reisman. Around this time, she adopted the pen name D.C. Fontana for her writing to prevent her pitches being prejudged on the basis of her sex, as she was one of the few women writers at NBC at the time. The Lieutenant was created by Gene Roddenberry, whom she ended up working directly for after his secretary fell ill. After finding out she wanted to become a writer, Roddenberry encouraged her. In 1964, she published her first novel, a Western called Brazos River, with Harry Sanford. The Lieutenant ran for one season.

After the series was canceled, Roddenberry began work on Star Trek, and Fontana was introduced to science fiction, which had not been a previous interest of hers. Following encouragement from associate producer Robert H. Justman, and as she had been working on the show from the start of the development, Roddenberry assigned her the task of writing a teleplay on an idea he had for an episode called "The Day Charlie Became God". She worked the premise into the script for "Charlie X", although she gave Roddenberry the story credit and only took the teleplay credit for herself. It was broadcast as the second episode of the series. Although this was an adapted story, she also wrote "Tomorrow Is Yesterday" from her own idea. By the middle of the first season Steve Carabatsos, the story editor, had already left the production, and it appeared that the second editor, John D. F. Black, was also planning to leave, so Roddenberry gave Fontana the task of rewriting the episode "This Side of Paradise". Both Roddenberry and the network were satisfied with Fontana's work, and she became the new story editor instead of Roddenberry's secretary in September 1966.

Fontana subsequently came up with the ideas for the episodes "Journey to Babel" and "Friday's Child". There were other works that she was formally credited with based on the Writers Guild arbitration that were only re-writes of episodes. She later recalled completely re-writing "The Ultimate Computer", as the original writer was unwilling to make the recommended changes. She said that this was a common issue: "You either had to do a light polish, sometimes just on dialogue and then you took no credit for that of course, because it would not be fair, but when you really do a total script overhaul, then it has to automatically go into the Writers Guild for arbitration." She was one of four writers to re-write Harlan Ellison's "The City on the Edge of Forever", alongside Roddenberry, Gene Coon and Carabatsos who had all made changes at different times to Ellison's displeasure. Fontana's draft, submitted on January 23, 1967, was superseded by three further versions by Roddenberry.

Fontana left the team prior to the third season, but continued to write scripts on a freelance basis. These included "The Enterprise Incident", "That Which Survives", and "The Way to Eden"; the last two were credited under the pseudonym Michael Richards. She disliked some of the changes made in "The Enterprise Incident", such as the size of the cloaking device, and found working with her replacement difficult, as the new story editor, Arthur H. Singer, did not understand the basics of the series, such as what the transporter did. She had a further disagreement with producer Fred Freiberger as to how old Leonard McCoy was meant to be as "The Way to Eden" was developed.

Leonard Nimoy credited her for expanding Vulcan culture within Star Trek. He was unsure when "This Side of Paradise" was proposed, as Fontana had changed the romantic lead from Hikaru Sulu to Spock but he enjoyed being able to act out emotions with the character, and also praised her work on "Journey to Babel" and "The Enterprise Incident". Nimoy also felt that Fontana stood out among other writers on the series for writing believable female characters who were fully developed in the screenplay.

Fontana's freelance status meant that she could write for several series, including Westerns once again. In 1969 she was nominated for a Writers Guild of America Award for an episode of Then Came Bronson, titled "Two Percent of Nothing".

== Becoming a producer ==
During the early 1970s, Fontana acted as Roddenberry's assistant on The Questor Tapes, but was not involved in the writing; she did however write the novelization. Fontana also wrote a script for Roddenberry's projected Genesis II series. She was hired as story editor, associate producer and de facto showrunner on Star Trek: The Animated Series. Roddenberry (credited for the first time on a Star Trek project as "executive consultant") retained nominal creative control but relinquished most of his authority to Fontana while focusing on other television endeavors and lecture tours. Accordingly, one of her responsibilities on the show was to receive pitches for episodes, which she would then relay to Roddenberry. The series won the Daytime Emmy Award for Outstanding Children's Series in 1975.

After that project ended, Fontana became the story editor on The Fantastic Journey (1977). Although it was soon canceled, working with Leonard Katzman led to Fontana writing for the Logan's Run (1977–1978) television series. She also sold stories to several other science fiction series, including The Six Million Dollar Man, Buck Rogers in the 25th Century, and Automan (although the latter never became an episode due to the cancellation of the show). Fontana wrote scripts with her brother for The Waltons and under her own name again for The Streets of San Francisco. One possibly apocryphal story involves Fontana's experience writing for Battlestar Galactica. She was reportedly so dissatisfied with revisions made to her script for "Gun on Ice Planet Zero" that she used a pseudonym; the story spread, resulting in other well-known science fiction writers refusing to work on the show.

When work on Star Trek: The Next Generation began, Roddenberry asked Fontana to join the team, and she offered to pitch some story ideas. After he suggested something involving an alien space station, she worked up the idea to become the pilot "Encounter at Farpoint". She was offered the position of story editor on the crew, but wanted to be an associate producer. Writer Robert Lewin found this difficult initially as, due to her being registered with the Writers Guild of America, he could not contractually ask her to do certain tasks. Since she had offered—and Roddenberry was expecting him to do it—he did anyway. She was eventually given her associate producer position.

Lewin said that this fight caused some resentment between Fontana and Roddenberry, and she left during the first season. She had written a story that would have brought Nimoy onto the show as Spock, but it was rejected by Roddenberry. When the actor and character later appeared in the fifth season episode "Unification", she felt that her original take on The Next Generation was the right one. Her work on "Encounter at Farpoint" was expanded by Roddenberry to add the character Q, as when she wrote her draft it was unclear whether it would be a single or double episode. She had her work on the episode "The Naked Now" credited to the pseudonym J Michael Bingham. Her relationship with Roddenberry became so strained prior to her departure that she began tape-recording their conversations. After she left, she put in a claim with the Writers Guild that she had also worked as a story editor on the series, but was never paid for it. This was settled amicably with Paramount Television.

== Later work ==
Pocket Books editor Dave Stern approached Fontana to write a Star Trek novel, and she proposed writing the story of Spock's first mission on the Enterprise, joining a crew led by Captain Christopher Pike. Vulcan's Glory also included Scotty's first mission and an exploration of Number One. She described this as a pleasant experience, particularly working with Stern.

Fontana returned to the Star Trek franchise, with "Dax", an episode of Star Trek: Deep Space Nine. Peter Allan Fields brought Fontana onto the series after he had previously worked with her on The Six Million Dollar Man. She found the episode difficult to write due to the characters not yet being fully explored since it was early in the first season. The nature of the character of Jadzia Dax's opinion of her previous symbionts had not yet been settled and was only resolved when Fields re-wrote part of Fontana's work. The duo were jointly credited with the screenplay.

Fontana wrote the episode "The War Prayer" for the first season of Babylon 5, based on a premise by series creator J. Michael Straczynski. Only the pilot was available for research purposes, so she spent some time speaking with Straczynski to get a feel for the series. She went on to work on the episode "Legacies", which was the only installment of the first season that was created by a freelancer, but not based on one of Straczynski's ideas. He asked her to pitch and chose the idea for "Legacies" over a premise of his own. For her season-two episode "A Distant Star", she wrote the script based on an idea by Straczynski. Straczynski was so impressed with her character Neroon from “Legacies” that he became a recurring role.

Together with Derek Chester, Fontana also wrote the scripts for Bethesda Softworks video games Star Trek: Legacy and Star Trek: Tactical Assault. Todd Vaughn, Bethesda Softworks' VP of Development, described her as "one of Star Trek's most prolific and distinguished writers".

Fontana wrote the episode "To Serve All My Days" for the fan-made production Star Trek: New Voyages.

Fontana's work on "The Enterprise Incident" in the third season of Star Trek led to IDW Publishing seeking to have her write a sequel in comic book form for Star Trek: Year Four, titled "The Enterprise Experiment".

After joining the Writers Guild of America in 1960, Fontana served on the board between 1988 and 1990, and between 1991 and 1993. She was awarded the Morgan Cox Award for services to the guild in 2002. She was inducted into the American Screenwriters Association hall of fame twice, in 1997 and in 2002.

== Personal life ==
In 1981, Fontana married visual effects artist Dennis Skotak.

On December 2, 2019, Fontana died of cancer at a hospital in Burbank, California.

== Works ==
=== Books ===
- Questor Tapes (1974): novelization
- Murder in Los Angeles (1987): co-author
- Vulcan’s Glory (1989): Star Trek book 44
- Futurus Rex (2022): Co-authored with Lynn Barker who finished the book after her death

=== Television ===
| Year | Title | Notes | Ref |
|---|---|---|---|
| 1960 | The Tall Man | Writer; two episodes As Dorothy C. Fontana | |
| 1961 | Frontier Circus | Writer, one episode As Dorothy C. Fontana | |
| 1961 | Shotgun Slade | Writer, one episode As Dorothy C. Fontana | |
| 1965 | Ben Casey | Writer, one episode | |
| 1966-1967 | The Wild Wild West | Writer (as Michael Edwards), two episodes: The Night of the Watery Death, The Night of the Deadly Bubble | |
| 1966–1968 | Star Trek | Writer, ten episodes Story editor (season 1 and 2) | |
| 1967 | The Road West | Writer, one episode | |
| 1968–1969 | The Big Valley | Writer, two episodes | |
| 1968–1969 | Lancer | Writer, two episodes | |
| 1968–1969 | The High Chaparral | Writer, two episodes | |
| 1969 | Then Came Bronson | Writer, one episode | |
| 1969–1970 | Bonanza | Writer, two episodes | |
| 1970 | Here Come the Brides | Writer, one episode | |
| 1972–1973 | Ghost Story | Writer, two episodes | |
| 1973 | Star Trek: The Animated Series | Writer, one episode Associate producer Story editor | |
| 1973–1975 | The Streets of San Francisco | Writer, four episodes As Dorothy C. Fontana | |
| 1974 | The Six Million Dollar Man | Writer, two episodes | |
| 1974 | Land of the Lost | Writer, one episode | |
| 1975 | Kung Fu | Writer, one episode | |
| 1976 | Bert D'Angelo/Superstar | Writer, one episode | |
| 1977 | The Fantastic Journey | Writer, one episode | |
| 1977–1979 | Logan's Run | Writer, three episodes Story editor | |
| 1978–1979 | The Waltons | Writer, three episodes | |
| 1978–1979 | Dallas | Writer, two episodes | |
| 1979 | Buck Rogers in the 25th Century | Writer, one episode | |
| 1985 | He-Man and the Masters of the Universe | Writer, one episode | |
| 1986–1987 | Star Trek: The Next Generation | Writer, five episodes Associate producer Story editor | |
| 1989 | War of the Worlds | Writer, one episode | |
| 1992 | The Legend of Prince Valiant | Writer, one episode | |
| 1993 | Star Trek: Deep Space Nine | Writer, one episode | |
| 1994 | Babylon 5 | Writer, three episodes | |
| 1996 | Hypernauts | Writer, one episode | |
| 1997 | Captain Simian & the Space Monkeys | Writer, two episodes | |
| 1997 | ReBoot | Writer, one episode | |
| 1997 | Earth: Final Conflict | Writer, one episode | |
| 1998 | Silver Surfer | Writer, one episode | |
| 1999 | Beast Wars: Transformers | Writer, one episode | |

=== Web drama series ===
| Year | Title | Notes | Ref |
|---|---|---|---|
| 2006 | Star Trek: New Voyages | Writer, one episode | |

== Bibliography ==
- Alexander, David (1995). Star Trek Creator: The Authorized Biography of Gene Roddenberry. New York: Roc. ISBN 0-451-45440-5.
- Ayers, Jeff (2006). Voyages of Imagination. New York: Pocket Books. ISBN 978-1-4165-0349-1.
- Block, Paula M.; Erdmann, Terry J. (2010). Star Trek: The Original Series 365. New York: Abrams. ISBN 978-0-8109-9172-9.
- Cushman, Marc; Osborn, Susan (2013). These Are the Voyages: TOS, Season One. San Diego, California: Jacobs Brown Press. ISBN 978-0-9892381-1-3.
- Erdmann, Terry J.; Block, Paula M. (2000). Star Trek: Deep Space Nine Companion. New York: Pocket Books. ISBN 978-0-671-50106-8.
- Gross, Edward; Altman, Mark A. (1993). Captain's Logs: The Complete Trek Voyages. London: Boxtree. ISBN 978-1-85283-899-7.
- Killick, Jane (1998). Babylon 5: Signs and Portents. New York: Ballantine Pub. Group. ISBN 978-0-345-42447-1.
- Killick, Jane (1998). Babylon 5: The Coming of Shadows. New York: Ballantine Pub. Group. ISBN 978-0-345-42448-8.
- Muir, John Kenneth (1999). An Analytical Guide to Television's Battlestar Galactica. Jefferson, North Carolina: McFarland. ISBN 978-0-7864-2455-9.
- Nemecek, Larry (2003). Star Trek: The Next Generation Companion (3rd ed.). New York: Pocket Books. ISBN 0-7434-5798-6.
- Nimoy, Leonard (1995). I Am Spock. New York: Hyperion. ISBN 978-0-7868-6182-8.
- Reeves-Stevens, Judith; Reeves-Stevens, Garfield (1998). Star Trek: The Next Generation: The Continuing Mission (2nd ed.). New York: Pocket Books. ISBN 978-0-671-02559-5.
- Roddenberry, Gene (1964). Star Trek (PDF). Los Angeles: Desilu Studios.
- Solow, Herbert F.; Justman, Robert H. (1996). Inside Star Trek: The Real Story. New York: Pocket Books. ISBN 978-0-671-89628-7.
- Stempel, Tom (1992). Storytellers to the Nation: A History of American Television Writing. New York: Continuum. ISBN 978-0-8264-0562-3.
