= Joseph Pevney =

American actor and director (1911–2008)

- Pevney in 1948
- Born: September 15, 1911; New York City, U.S.
- Died: May 18, 2008 (aged 96); Palm Desert, California, U.S.
- Occupations: Film and television director
- Years active: 1946–1985
- Spouse(s): Mitzi Green (m. 1942; died 1969) Philippa Hilber (m. 1989; died 1996) Margo Yvette Collins (m. 2002)
- Children: 4

Joseph Pevney (September 15, 1911 – May 18, 2008) was an American film and television director.

== Biography ==
Born in New York City, Pevney made his debut in vaudeville as a boy soprano in 1924. Although he hated vaudeville, he loved the theatre and developed a career as a stage actor, appearing in such plays as Home of the Brave, The World We Make, Key Largo, Golden Boy, and Native Son. A short career as a film actor followed, his most significant appearance being in the classic boxing film Body and Soul (1947) with John Garfield, in which he played the role of Shorty Pulaski. Before turning to film, he served in the Signal Corps in World War II, then did more time on stage.

Beginning with Shakedown (1950), Pevney became a film and television director, with a directing career that spanned over 80 productions from 1950 to 1984. Among his films were Robert Louis Stevenson's The Strange Door (1951) with Charles Laughton and Boris Karloff, Meet Danny Wilson (1952) with Frank Sinatra, Desert Legion (1953) with Alan Ladd, 3 Ring Circus (1954) with Dean Martin and Jerry Lewis, Female on the Beach (1955) with Joan Crawford and Jeff Chandler, Tammy and the Bachelor (1957) with Debbie Reynolds, Walter Brennan, and Leslie Nielsen, Man of a Thousand Faces (1957) with James Cagney as Lon Chaney, Cash McCall (1959) with James Garner and Natalie Wood, The Crowded Sky (1960) with Dana Andrews, and Westerns such as The Plunderers (1960).

Pevney also directed multiple episodes of noted television series, including Bonanza, Star Trek, The Paper Chase, and Trapper John, M.D.. He tied with Marc Daniels for directing the largest number of original Star Trek episodes (14 in total), including "The Devil in the Dark, "Arena", Harlan Ellison's "The City on the Edge of Forever", "Amok Time", "Journey to Babel", and "The Trouble with Tribbles". Star Trek NBC executive Herb Solow and executive co-producer Robert Justman write, in their 1996 book Star Trek The Real Story, of Pevney:

Joseph Pevney was an ex-actor turned director. Some former actors become good directors; some become hack directors. Pevney was the former, but more than just "good."

He continued directing TV shows during the 1970s and 1980s. The last he stayed with was Trapper John, M.D. running between 1979 and 1986, followed by retirement.

Pevney was married three times. His first wife was the actress Mitzi Green, with whom he had four children. His second wife, whom he married in 1989, was Philippa Goodwin-Pevney (née Hilber, 1918–1996). He married Margo Yvette Collins in 2002.

On May 18, 2008, Pevney died at his home in Palm Desert, California, at age 96.

== Selected filmography ==
As actor:

- Nocturne (1946) as Fingers
- Body and Soul (1947) as Shorty Polaski
- The Street with No Name (1948) as Matty
- Thieves' Highway (1949) as Pete
- Outside the Wall (1950) as Gus Wormser
- Shakedown (1950) as Keller, the reporter (uncredited, final film role)

As director:

- Shakedown (1950)
- Undercover Girl (1950)
- The Iron Man (1951)
- The Lady from Texas (1951)
- The Strange Door (1951)
- Air Cadet (1951)
- Flesh and Fury (1952)
- Meet Danny Wilson (1952)
- Because of You (1952)
- Just Across the Street (1952)
- Desert Legion (1953)
- Back to God's Country (1953)
- It Happens Every Thursday (1953)
- Yankee Pasha (1954)
- Playgirl (1954)
- 3 Ring Circus (1954)
- Six Bridges to Cross (1955)
- Foxfire (1955)
- Female on the Beach (1955)
- Away All Boats (1956)
- Congo Crossing (1956)
- Man of a Thousand Faces (1957)
- The Midnight Story (1957)
- Istanbul (1957)
- Tammy and the Bachelor (1957)
- Torpedo Run (1958)
- Twilight for the Gods (1958)
- Cash McCall (1959)
- The Crowded Sky (1960)
- The Plunderers (1960)
- Portrait of a Mobster (1961)
- The Night of the Grizzly (1966)
- Mysterious Island of Beautiful Women (1979)
