= Gerald Finnerman =

American cinematographer

- Born: Gerald Perry Finnerman; December 17, 1931; Los Angeles, California, U.S.
- Died: April 6, 2011 (aged 79); Los Angeles, California, U.S.
- Resting place: Mount Sinai Memorial Park
- Occupation: Cinematographer
- Years active: 1959–1995
- Parent: Perry Finnerman (father)

Gerald Perry Finnerman (December 17, 1931 – April 6, 2011) was an American cinematographer who worked on TV series such as Moonlighting and the original Star Trek. He served as vice president of the American Society of Cinematographers, and won a Primetime Emmy Award for Outstanding Cinematography in Entertainment Programming for a Special.

== Biography ==
Gerald Finnerman was born on December 17, 1931, in Los Angeles, California. He attended Hollywood High School, and afterwards went to Loyola Marymount University, where he majored in abnormal psychology. Finnerman was a combat photographer before joining his father, Perry Finnerman, at Warner Bros., where Perry was contracted as a camera operator (and, later, a cinematographer). After Perry's death at the age of 56, Finnerman began to work with Harry Stradling at Warner. Stradling promoted Finnerman from focus puller to camera operator, and in 1964 the two left Warner to become freelancers.

They worked together for Paramount Pictures, Universal Studios and Columbia Pictures on films such as Walk, Don't Run, starring Cary Grant, and the Jack Lemmon movie How to Murder Your Wife. Finnerman was Stradling's camera operator when he won the Academy Award for Best Cinematography for My Fair Lady. Stradling recommended him as a cinematographer to Desilu Productions for their new science fiction series, Star Trek, after Harry Stradling Jr. turned down the job.

He was subsequently hired, and, at the age of 32, was one of the youngest cinematographers in Hollywood. He later said, "On a show like Star Trek, you have to push the envelope, the result of playing it safe is a diet of pabulum." He used light placements and colored gels as mood lighting. Employing lighting techniques and changing background wall colors, he discovered that a range of effects could be seen on a single set. One enhancement he made was the effects for the transporter; he explained, "I put fixtures in the bottom and fixtures in the top, and [the actors] would stand on them. Then I would have somebody on a dimmer work the visual, the special effect of light going on and off, and then they would zap them."

He worked on Star Trek through most of the three-year run of the series, and afterwards moved on to Mission: Impossible, another Paramount (and former Desilu) production. He worked on The Lost Man starring Sidney Poitier. In 1969 he was on board a small Piper Pacer airplane with other crew, to scout out locations in Colorado. The plane crashed, and Finnerman was the sole survivor. The injuries he suffered in the crash resulted in him being required to wear a metal full body brace for the following six years. He joined the American Society of Cinematographers in 1970 after being nominated by Stradling. He went on to become vice president of the society.

During the 1970s and 1980s, he earned Primetime Emmy Award nominations for his work on Kojak, From Here to Eternity, and The Gangster Chronicles. He won an Emmy for Outstanding Cinematography in Entertainment Programming for a Special for his work on the television film Ziegfeld: The Man and His Women. In 1985, he began working on Moonlighting, for which he gained two further Emmy nominations. The creator of Star Trek, Gene Roddenberry, invited Finnerman to join the team putting together Star Trek: The Next Generation in 1986, but he turned down the offer. In 1996, he was inducted into the Producers Guild Hall of Fame for his work on Star Trek, and he was nominated by the Motion Picture & Television Fund for "Philanthropic Man of the Year". He announced his retirement in 2002. He died in 2011 and was interred at Mount Sinai Memorial Park.
