= Leonard McCoy =

Fictional character from Star Trek

- Star Trek character
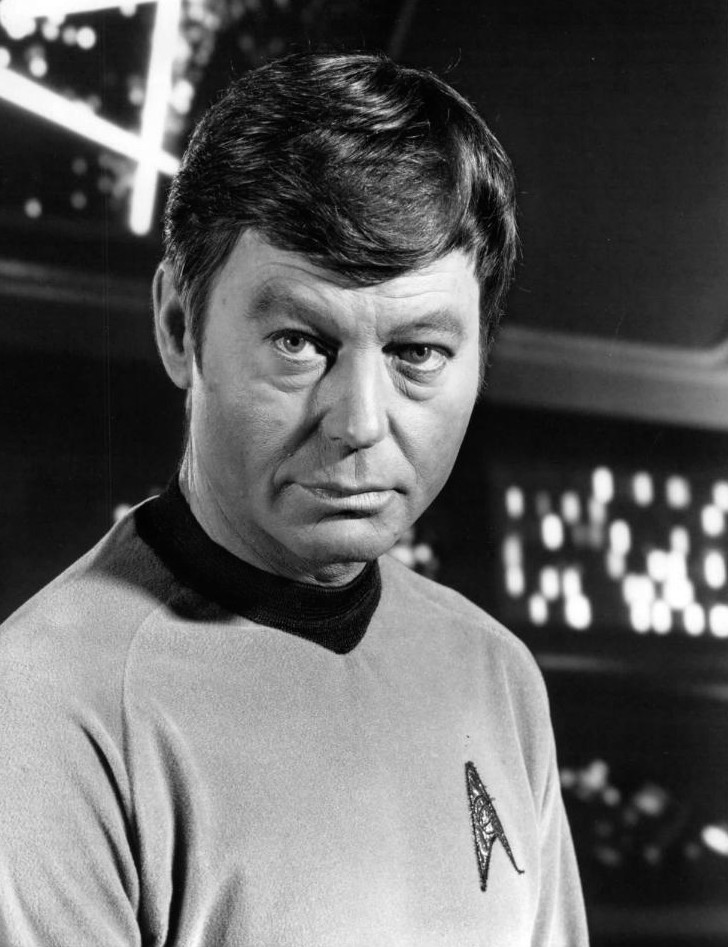
- DeForest Kelley as Leonard McCoy in a publicity photograph for the original Star Trek series
- First appearance: "The Man Trap"; Star Trek; September 6, 1966
- Last appearance: Star Trek Beyond; July 7, 2016
- Created by: Gene Roddenberry
- Portrayed by: DeForest Kelley (1966–1999); Karl Urban (2009–2016); Thomas Jane (2026)

In-universe information
- Full name: Leonard H. McCoy
- Nickname: Bones
- Species: Human
- Gender: Male
- Title: Doctor
- Affiliation: United Federation of Planets; Starfleet
- Family: David McCoy (father)
- Spouses: Unnamed wife (divorced); Natira (separated)
- Children: Joanna McCoy (daughter)

Dr. Leonard H. McCoy, known as "Bones", is a character in the American science-fiction franchise Star Trek. McCoy was played by actor DeForest Kelley in the original Star Trek series from 1966 to 1969, and he also appears in the animated Star Trek series, in six Star Trek films, in the pilot episode of Star Trek: The Next Generation, and in numerous books, comics, and video games. A decade after Kelley's death, Karl Urban assumed the role of McCoy in the Star Trek reboot film in 2009. Thomas Jane will portray McCoy in the 5th season of Star Trek: Strange New Worlds.

== Depiction ==
McCoy was born in Atlanta, Georgia, in 2227. The son of David McCoy, he attended the University of Mississippi and is a divorcé. McCoy later married Natira, the priestess of Yonada, as recounted in the episode "For the World Is Hollow and I Have Touched the Sky". In 2266, McCoy was posted as chief medical officer of the USS Enterprise under Captain James T. Kirk, who often calls him "Bones". McCoy and Kirk are good friends, even "brotherly". The passionate, sometimes cantankerous McCoy frequently argues with Kirk's other confidant, science officer Spock, and occasionally is annoyed by Spock's Vulcan heritage. McCoy often plays the role of Kirk's conscience, offering a counterpoint to Spock's logic. McCoy is suspicious of technology, especially the transporter. As a physician, he prefers less intrusive treatment and believes in the body's innate recuperative powers. The nickname "Bones" – chosen before the character was named – is a play on sawbones, a 19th century epithet for a surgeon. In the 2009 Star Trek film reboot, when McCoy first meets Kirk, he complains that his ex-wife took all their shared assets following their divorce: "All I got left is my bones", implying this was the origin of the nickname.

When Kirk orders McCoy's commission reactivated in Star Trek: The Motion Picture (1979); a resentful McCoy complains of being "drafted". Spock transfers his katra—his knowledge and experience—into McCoy before dying in Star Trek II: The Wrath of Khan (1982). This causes mental anguish for McCoy, who in Star Trek III: The Search for Spock (1984) helps restore Spock's katra to his reanimated body. McCoy continues to serve on Kirk's crew aboard the captured Klingon ship in Star Trek IV: The Voyage Home (1986). In Star Trek V: The Final Frontier (1989), McCoy (through the intervention of Spock's half-brother Sybok) reveals that he had performed elective euthanasia on his terminally ill father to relieve him of severe pain. Shortly afterward, a cure was found for his father's disease, and McCoy had carried the guilt about it with him until Sybok's intervention.

In Star Trek VI: The Undiscovered Country (1991), McCoy and Kirk escape from a Klingon prison world, and the Enterprise crew stops a plot to prevent peace between the United Federation of Planets and the Klingon Empire. Kelley reprised the role for the "Encounter at Farpoint" pilot episode of Star Trek: The Next Generation (1987), insisting upon no more than the minimum Screen Actors Guild payment for his appearance. McCoy had attained the rank of admiral in the Trek timeline when this episode was aired, and he is stated to be 137 years of age. He went on to become chief of Starfleet Medical, with a special rank known as branch admiral. The fictional book Comparative Alien Physiology was written by McCoy, and was required reading at the Starfleet Medical Academy through the 2370s.

In the 1973 Star Trek: The Animated Series episode "The Survivor", McCoy mentions he has a daughter, Joanna. Although Chekov's friend Irina in the original series episode "The Way to Eden" was originally written as McCoy's daughter, it was changed before the episode was shot.

=== Reboot film series ===
Karl Urban as McCoy in Star Trek (2009)

In the 2009 Star Trek film, which takes place in an alternate, parallel reality, McCoy and Kirk become friends at Starfleet Academy, which McCoy joins after a divorce that he says, "left [him] nothing but [his] bones." This line, improvised by Urban, explains how McCoy earned the nickname Bones. McCoy later helps get Kirk posted aboard the USS Enterprise. He later becomes the chief medical officer after Doctor Puri is killed during an attack by Nero. McCoy remains aboard to see the Enterprise defeat Nero and his crew, with Kirk becoming the commanding officer of the ship.

The Guardian called Urban's portrayal of McCoy in the 2009 film an "unqualified success", and The New York Times called the character "wild-eyed and funny". Slate said Urban came closer than the other actors to impersonating a character's original depiction.

== Development ==
Kelley had worked with Star Trek creator Gene Roddenberry on previous television pilots, and he was Roddenberry's first choice to play the doctor aboard the USS Enterprise. However, for the rejected pilot "The Cage" (1964), Roddenberry went with director Robert Butler's choice of John Hoyt to play Dr. Philip Boyce. For the second pilot, "Where No Man Has Gone Before" (1966), Roddenberry accepted director James Goldstone's decision to have Paul Fix play Dr. Mark Piper. Although Roddenberry wanted Kelley to play the character of ship's doctor, he did not put Kelley's name forward to NBC; the network never "rejected" the actor, as Roddenberry sometimes suggested.

Kelley's first broadcast appearance as Doctor Leonard McCoy was in "The Man Trap" (1966). Despite his character's prominence, Kelley's contract granted him only a "featuring" credit; he was not given "starring" credit until the second season, at the urging of producer Robert Justman. Kelley was apprehensive about Star Trek's future, telling Roddenberry that the show was "going to be the biggest hit or the biggest miss God ever made". Kelley portrayed McCoy throughout the original Star Trek series, and voiced the character in the animated Star Trek.

Kelley, who in his youth wanted to become a doctor like his uncle, but whose family could not pay for a medical education, in part drew upon his real-life experiences in creating McCoy, a doctor's "matter-of-fact" delivery of news of Kelley's mother's terminal cancer was the "abrasive sand" Kelley used in creating McCoy's demeanor. Star Trek writer D. C. Fontana said that while Roddenberry created the series, Kelley essentially created McCoy; everything done with the character was done with Kelley's input.

"Exquisite chemistry" among Kelley, William Shatner, and Leonard Nimoy manifested itself in their performances as McCoy, Captain James T. Kirk, and Science Officer Spock, respectively. Nichelle Nichols, who played Uhura, referred to Kelley as her "sassy gentleman friend"; the friendship between the African-American Nichols and Southern Kelley was a real-life demonstration of the message Roddenberry hoped to convey through Star Trek.

For the 2009 Star Trek film, writers Roberto Orci and Alex Kurtzman saw McCoy as an "arbiter" in Kirk and Spock's relationship. While Spock represented "extreme logic, extreme science" and Kirk symbolized "extreme emotion and intuition", McCoy's role as "a very colorful doctor, essentially a very humanistic scientist", represented the "two extremes that often served as the glue that held the trio together". They chose to reveal that McCoy befriended Kirk first, explaining the "bias" in their friendship and why he would often be a "little dismissive" of Spock. Urban said the script was "very faithful" to the original character, including the "great compassion for humanity and that sense of irascibility" with which Kelley imbued the character. New Zealand-born Urban trained with a dialect coach to create McCoy's accent and reprised the role in its sequels Star Trek Into Darkness and Star Trek Beyond.

== Cultural impact ==
McCoy is someone to whom Kirk unburdens himself, but is a foil to Spock. He is Kirk's "friend, personal bartender, confidant, counselor, and priest". Spock and McCoy's bickering became so popular that Roddenberry wrote in a 1968 memo "we simply didn't realize ... how much the fans loved the bickering between our Arrowsmith and our Alien". Urban said McCoy has a "sense of irascibility with real passion for life and doing the right thing", and that "Spock's logic and McCoy's moral standing gave Kirk the benefit of having three brains instead of just one."

Kelley said that his greatest thrill at Star Trek conventions was the number of people who told him they entered the medical profession because of the McCoy character. He received two or three letters a month from others reporting similar experiences. A friend observed that despite not becoming a doctor as he had hoped, Kelley's portrayal of McCoy had helped create many doctors. According to Kelley, "You can win awards and that sort of thing, but to influence the youth of the country ... is an award that is not handed out by the industry".

=== "He's dead, Jim." ===
Twenty times on the original Star Trek series, McCoy declares someone or something deceased with the line, "He's dead", "He's dead, Jim", or something similar. The phrase so became a catchphrase of the character that Kelley joked that the line would appear on his tombstone—and it appeared in the first sentence of at least one obituary—but disliked repeating the line. During filming of Star Trek II: The Wrath of Khan, when Spock is dying from radiation exposure, Kelley felt it would spoil the gravitas of the moment, so he and James Doohan agreed to swap their lines: McCoy warns Kirk not to open the chamber, and Scotty says, "He's dead already".

University of Southern California literature professor Henry Jenkins cites Dr. McCoy's "He's dead, Jim" line as an example of fans actively participating in the creation of an underground culture in which they derive pleasure by repeating memorable lines as part of constructing new mythologies and alternative social communities. As an example, the line appears in The Firm's 1987 novelty song Star Trekkin', which became a #1 hit in the United Kingdom.

=== "I'm a doctor, not a..." ===
Another of McCoy's catchphrases is his "I'm a doctor, (Jim) not a(n)..." statements, delivered by Kelley 11 times, and three times by Karl Urban in later films. McCoy repeats the line when he must perform some task beyond his medical skills, such as when he is asked to treat the unfamiliar silicon-based Horta alien in "The Devil in the Dark" (1967), saying, "I'm a doctor, not a bricklayer." Variations of the line have also been used by doctors in other Trek series, including Julian Bashir, Phlox, and the Emergency Medical Hologram stationed aboard Voyager.

Kelley parodied the phrase in a 1992 commercial for Trivial Pursuit's 10th Anniversary Edition, in which the question is asked, "How many chambers are there in a human heart?" replying "How should I know? I'm an actor, not a doctor!".

It is often believed that Kelley said "Damn it, Jim!" before the "I'm a doctor" line, but in reality "damn" was never said on the original show (although "damning" was used) because the word was considered taboo on TV in the 1960s.

== Reception ==
In a rebuttal to a tongue-in-cheek analysis in the Canadian Medical Association Journal, which claimed that Dr. Nick from The Simpsons was a better role model than his competitor Dr. Hibbert, both of which were published in the same journal in 1998, both doctors are cast aside for Dr. McCoy, "TV's only true physician" and "someone who has broken free from the yoke of ethics and practises the art and science of medicine beyond the stultifying opposition of paternalism and autonomy. A free and independent thinker and, indeed, someone even beyond role models".

In 2012, IGN ranked the character Doctor McCoy, as depicted in the original series, its films, and the 2009 film Star Trek, as the fifth-top character of the Star Trek universe, behind Data, Picard, Spock, and Kirk.

In 2016, Doctor McCoy was ranked as the fifth-most important character of Starfleet within the Star Trek science-fiction universe by Wired.

In 2016, SyFy ranked McCoy third of the six main-cast space doctors of the Star Trek franchise.

In 2017, Screen Rant ranked the reboot film (Kelvin timeline) McCoy, played by Urban, as the 17th-most attractive person in the Star Trek universe.

In 2018, The Wrap placed Doctor McCoy as sixth out of 39 in a ranking of main cast characters of the Star Trek franchise. In 2018, CBR ranked McCoy as the 11th-best Starfleet character of Star Trek.

== Bibliography ==
- Solow, Herbert; Justman, Robert (June 1997). Inside Star Trek The Real Story. Simon & Schuster. ISBN 978-0-671-00974-8.
