= Star Trek: The Original Series season 3 =

Star Trek: The Original Series
- Season 3
- DVD and Blu-ray cover
- Starring: William Shatner; Leonard Nimoy; DeForest Kelley
- No. of episodes: 24

Release
- Original network: NBC
- Original release: September 20, 1968 – June 3, 1969

Season chronology
- ← Previous; Season 2

The third and final season of the American science fiction television series Star Trek, premiered on NBC on Friday, September 20, 1968, and concluded on Tuesday, June 3, 1969. It consisted of twenty-four episodes. Star Trek: The Original Series is an American science fiction television series produced by Fred Freiberger, and created by Gene Roddenberry, and the original series of the Star Trek franchise. It features William Shatner as Captain James T. Kirk, Leonard Nimoy as Spock and DeForest Kelley as Leonard McCoy.

== Broadcast history ==
This is the first season to air after NBC moved the show from 8:30 p.m. to 10 p.m. on Friday nights. The season originally aired Fridays at 10:00–11:00 p.m. (EST) on NBC. The final episode aired on Tuesday, June 3, 1969, at 7:30–8:30 p.m. (EST).

== Cast ==
=== Main ===
- William Shatner as Captain James T. Kirk: The commanding officer of the USS Enterprise
- Leonard Nimoy as Commander Spock: The ship's half-human/half-Vulcan science officer and first/executive officer
- DeForest Kelley as Lieutenant Commander Dr. Leonard "Bones" McCoy: The ship's chief medical officer
- James Doohan as Lieutenant Commander Montgomery "Scotty" Scott: The Enterprise's chief engineer and second officer
- Nichelle Nichols as Lieutenant Uhura: The ship's communications officer
- George Takei as Lieutenant Sulu: The ship's helmsman
- Walter Koenig as Ensign Pavel Chekov: A Russian-born navigator introduced in the second season premiere episode
- Majel Barrett as Nurse Christine Chapel: The ship's head nurse. Barrett also played the ship's first officer (Number One) in "The Cage" and voiced the ship's computer.

=== Recurring ===
- Eddie Paskey as Lt. Leslie

== Episodes ==
No. overall	No. in season	Title	Directed by	Written by	Original release date	Prod. code	U.S. households (in millions)
56	1	"Spock's Brain"	Marc Daniels	Gene L. Coon (Note: Credited as Lee Cronin)	September 20, 1968	61	9.18
Captain Kirk pursues aliens who have stolen Spock's brain.
57	2	"The Enterprise Incident"	John Meredyth Lucas	D. C. Fontana	September 27, 1968	59	6.67
The crew of the Enterprise attempts to steal a Romulan cloaking device.
58	3	"The Paradise Syndrome"	Jud Taylor	Margaret Armen	October 4, 1968	58	7.58
A mysterious alien device on a planet with a predominantly American Indian culture erases Captain Kirk's memory, and he begins a life with them as a member of their tribe.
59	4	"And the Children Shall Lead"	Marvin Chomsky	Edward J. Lakso	October 11, 1968	60	7.98
The crew of the Enterprise rescues a group of children stranded on a planet, along with their evil "imaginary" friend.
60	5	"Is There in Truth No Beauty?"	Ralph Senensky	Jean Lisette Aroeste	October 18, 1968	62	7.35
The Enterprise travels with an alien ambassador who must travel inside a special case because his appearance causes insanity.
61	6	"Spectre of the Gun"	Vincent McEveety	Gene L. Coon	October 25, 1968	56	7.70
For trespassing on an alien world, Captain Kirk and his companions are forced to re-enact the famous shoot-out at the O.K. Corral with themselves cast as the losing side.
62	7	"Day of the Dove"	Marvin Chomsky	Jerome Bixby	November 1, 1968	66	7.98
An alien energy-based life form that feeds on negative emotions (such as fear, anger, hatred) drives the crew of the Enterprise into brutal conflict with the Klingons.
63	8	"For the World Is Hollow and I Have Touched the Sky"	Tony Leader	Hendrik Vollaerts	November 8, 1968	65	7.52
As McCoy discovers he is dying of an incurable disease, the crew of the Enterprise rush to stop an asteroid from colliding with a Federation world, only to discover that the asteroid is, in fact, a disguised alien vessel. They find an entire civilization living in the ship who believe they are actually on a planet and a dictatorial "Oracle" who forbids any attempt to discover the truth.
64	9	"The Tholian Web"	Herb Wallerstein	Judy Burns and Chet Richards	November 15, 1968	64	7.64
Captain Kirk is caught between dimensions while the Enterprise is trapped by an energy draining web spun by mysterious aliens. The two-part Enterprise episode "In a Mirror, Darkly" serves as a sequel to this episode.
65	10	"Plato's Stepchildren"	David Alexander	Meyer Dolinsky	November 22, 1968	67	7.41
The crew of the Enterprise encounters an ageless and mischievous race of psychic humanoids who claim to have organized their society around Ancient Greek ideals.
66	11	"Wink of an Eye"	Jud Taylor	Story by : Gene L. Coon; Teleplay by : Arthur Heinemann	November 29, 1968	68	8.72
Invisible "time-accelerated" aliens take over the Enterprise and attempt to abduct the crew for use as "genetic stock".
67	12	"The Empath"	John Erman	Joyce Muskat	December 6, 1968	63	9.86
While visiting a doomed planet, the landing party is subject to torturous experiments to test an empathic race.
68	13	"Elaan of Troyius"	John Meredyth Lucas	John Meredyth Lucas	December 20, 1968	57	7.81
While transporting an arrogant, demanding spoiled princess for a political marriage, Captain Kirk must cope both with her biochemical ability to force him to love her and sabotage on his ship.
69	14	"Whom Gods Destroy"	Herb Wallerstein	Story by : Lee Erwin and Jerry Sohl; Teleplay by : Lee Erwin	January 3, 1969	71	6.84
Captain Kirk visits a mental health facility and confronts an insane starship captain who believes he is destined to control the universe.
70	15	"Let That Be Your Last Battlefield"	Jud Taylor	Story by : Gene L. Coon; Teleplay by : Oliver Crawford	January 10, 1969	70	7.92
The Enterprise picks up the last two survivors of a war-torn planet who are still committed to destroying each other aboard the ship.
71	16	"The Mark of Gideon"	Jud Taylor	George F. Slavin and Stanley Adams	January 17, 1969	72	6.78
An overpopulated race of aliens abduct Kirk to solve their problem.
72	17	"That Which Survives"	Herb Wallerstein	Story by : D. C. Fontana (Note: Credited as Michael Richards); Teleplay by : John Meredyth Lucas	January 24, 1969	69	7.81
The crew of the Enterprise visits an abandoned outpost guarded by a mysterious computer.
73	18	"The Lights of Zetar"	Herb Kenwith	Jeremy Tarcher and Shari Lewis	January 31, 1969	73	8.09
Strange, energy-based alien life forms threaten the Memory Alpha station and the Enterprise crew.
74	19	"Requiem for Methuselah"	Murray Golden	Jerome Bixby	February 14, 1969	76	6.95
The crew of the Enterprise encounters an immortal human who lives as a recluse on his own planet.
75	20	"The Way to Eden"	David Alexander	Story by : D. C. Fontana and Arthur Heinemann; Teleplay by : Arthur Heinemann	February 21, 1969	75	7.07
The Enterprise is hijacked by a criminal doctor and his loyal, hippie-like followers who are attempting to find paradise.
76	21	"The Cloud Minders"	Jud Taylor	Story by : David Gerrold and Oliver Crawford; Teleplay by : Margaret Armen	February 28, 1969	74	7.58
Kirk races against time to acquire plague-fighting minerals from a world in the midst of a civil uprising.
77	22	"The Savage Curtain"	Herschel Daugherty	Story by : Gene Roddenberry; Teleplay by : Gene Roddenberry and Arthur Heinemann	March 7, 1969	77	6.73
Aliens force Kirk and Spock to battle illusionary villains in a test of good versus evil.
78	23	"All Our Yesterdays"	Marvin Chomsky	Jean Lisette Aroeste	March 14, 1969	78	7.41
Kirk, Spock, and McCoy are trapped in the past on a world threatened by a nova.
79	24	"Turnabout Intruder"	Herb Wallerstein	Story by : Gene Roddenberry; Teleplay by : Arthur Singer	June 3, 1969	79	5.02
Kirk's consciousness becomes trapped in the body of a woman bent on killing him and taking over his command while inhabiting his body.

== Home media ==
The season was released on DVD and Blu-ray by Paramount Home Entertainment.

The third season was released in original and also in a remastered format by 2008.
