= Mary Tarcai =

American actress

Mary Tarcai (July 6, 1906 – September 22, 1979 in New York City) was an actress. She was born in the Austro-Hungarian Empire, emigrated to the United States with her family when she was a child and grew up in Cleveland, Ohio.

She began her career as an actress at the Neighborhood Playhouse in New York City and later taught there. Her background was in the Stanislavski method and in New York at the beginning of her career she worked with Isaac Boleslavsky and Maria Ouspenskaya.

After leaving the Neighborhood Playhouse she went to Atlantic City, where she started her own theater and produced her own shows. She then went to Los Angeles and worked with the Actors' Lab for seven years and also as an assistant to many film directors.

Returning to New York in 1955, she began teaching acting, both at the Neighborhood Playhouse and privately. She was one of the first to teach classes centering on cold readings. Her students over the years included Shirley MacLaine, Florence Henderson, Charlotte Rae, Edmond O'Brien, Valerie Harper, Raymond Burr, Julie Newmar, Ralph Waite, Lilia Skala, and Ann B. Davis. She was married to Arthur H. Singer, a writer and story editor on the third season of the original Star Trek series, until his death in 1978.
