= Whom Gods Destroy (Star Trek: The Original Series) =

- Star Trek: The Original Series episode
- Episode no.: Season 3 Episode 14
- Directed by: Herb Wallerstein
- Story by: Lee Erwin; Jerry Sohl
- Teleplay by: Lee Erwin
- Cinematography by: Al Francis
- Production code: 071
- Original air date: January 3, 1969

Guest appearances
- Keye Luke – Governor Donald Cory; Steve Ihnat – Fleet Captain Garth; Yvonne Craig – Marta; Gary Downey – Tellarite; Richard Geary – Andorian

Episode chronology
← Previous "Elaan of Troyius"	Next → "Let That Be Your Last Battlefield"
- Star Trek: The Original Series season 3

"Whom Gods Destroy" is the fourteenth episode of the third season of the American science fiction television series Star Trek. Written by Lee Erwin (based on a story by Lee Erwin and Jerry Sohl) and directed by Herb Wallerstein, it was first broadcast on NBC on January 3, 1969.

In the episode, Captain Kirk faces off with a deranged shape-shifting starship fleet captain determined to control the universe.

The title is based on a phrase spoken by Prometheus in Henry Wadsworth Longfellow's poem The Masque of Pandora (1875): "Whom the gods would destroy they first make mad."

This episode was not aired by the BBC in the United Kingdom because of "sadistic plot elements" and the risqué dance performed by the character Marta, thought unsuitable for children. The episode remained unaired until 1994.

== Plot ==
The Federation starship Enterprise arrives at the planet Elba II, home to a Federation facility for the criminally insane, carrying a shipment of new medication which is believed will cure all violent insanity. Captain Kirk and First Officer Spock beam down with the shipment to meet the facility director Donald Cory. Instead, they find that the inmates have taken over the facility and locked Cory in a cell. The inmates are led by Garth of Izar, a former starship fleet captain, mentally unstable as the result of an injury. He acquired the ability to shapeshift using a method taught to him to heal his own injuries, and was released from his cell when he assumed Cory's form.

Kirk and Spock are imprisoned, and Garth, in Kirk's form, orders Chief Engineer Scott to beam him aboard, intending to use the Enterprise to conquer the galaxy. However, Scott refuses when Garth fails to give the correct response to a passphrase challenge. Scott and the Enterprise crew recognize something is wrong, but a force field around the facility prevents them from taking any action.

After a banquet with Kirk and Spock, Garth inquires about the passphrase. Kirk refuses to reveal it, and Garth resorts to torturing both Doctor Cory and Kirk. One of the inmates, an Orion female named Marta, attempts to seduce and then kill Kirk, but Spock arrives and subdues her. The two make contact with the ship. Kirk, sensing something amiss, instructs Spock to provide the passphrase, which he cannot do, forcing Garth to reveal he had taken Spock's form.

Once again a captive, Kirk witnesses Garth's "coronation" as "Master of the Universe". Garth demonstrates his power by killing Marta with an explosive planted on her body. Still unable to get Kirk's cooperation, Garth sends for Spock, who overpowers his escorts. On entering a control room, Spock faces two Kirks, each of whom accuses the other of being Garth. A struggle begins, during which one Kirk orders Spock to stun them both; Spock stuns the other, who is revealed to be Garth of Izar. Once again in control of the facility, Doctor Cory administers the new drugs to Garth and the other inmates. Once cured of his mental illness, Garth no longer remembers anything that has happened since his injury.

== Reception ==
In 2017, Den of Geek ranked this episode as the 11th worst Star Trek episode of the original series, citing its standard Star Trek plot and Steve Ihnat's overacting. Zack Handlen of The A.V. Club gave it a C+, saying the episode has a compelling opening but fails to completely deliver on its premise. He remarked that while Garth and Marta were good, unpredictable villains, the tension between Kirk and Garth was weak, and there was little at stake once Garth was foiled by the countersign.

== Censorship ==
In the United Kingdom, this episode was excluded from the original airing of the third season, as censors objected both to the torture of Kirk and to a dance performed by Marta in the banquet scene. The dance in particular was felt to be inappropriate for children. On German television, presumably for similar reasons, the episode was not shown in the series' original run in 1972/73, but was first aired on 9 May 1988.

== Releases ==
This episode was released in Japan on December 21, 1993, as part of the complete season 3 LaserDisc set, Star Trek: Original Series log.3. A trailer for this and the other episodes was also included, and the episode had English and Japanese audio tracks.

This episode was included in TOS Season 3 remastered DVD box set, with the remastered version of this episode.

== See also ==
- "The System of Doctor Tarr and Professor Fether"
- Prelude to Axanar, fan film depicting Garth of Izar's early life
