= Kenneth Washington =

American actor (1936–2025)

- Washington as Sgt Richard Baker in Hogan's Heroes
- Born: October 19, 1936; Ethel, Mississippi, U.S.
- Died: July 18, 2025 (aged 88); Beverly Hills, California, U.S.
- Occupation: Actor
- Years active: 1956–1989
- Known for: Sgt. Richard Baker (Hogan's Heroes); Officer Miller (Adam-12)
- Spouses: Alyce Loretta Hawkins (m. 1959–1969) Alice Agnes Marshall (m. 2001)
- Children: 3, all with Hawkins

Kenneth Washington (October 19, 1936 – July 18, 2025) was an American television and film actor best known for playing Sergeant Richard Baker on the final season of Hogan's Heroes and Officer Miller on Adam-12.

== Early life ==
Washington was born in Ethel, Mississippi, on October 19, 1936. He grew up in San Francisco, California, after his family relocated there. Later he decided to pursue acting and moved to Los Angeles, California.

== Film and television career ==
In film, Washington was uncredited in 1956's The Birds and the Bees.

Washington started his TV career in 1968 in the American family drama series Daktari that aired on CBS. He had a recurring role in Adam-12 as Officer Miller. He also appeared in the Star Trek episode "That Which Survives" as the ill-fated engineer John B. Watkins.

In 1970, Washington was cast as a series regular on Hogan's Heroes, replacing actor Ivan Dixon. He had several guest-starring roles throughout the 1970s. In 1989, Washington guest-starred on A Different World.

== Personal life and death ==
Washington married Alice Marshall; the couple had three children, three grandchildren and four great-grandchildren.

Washington died on July 18, 2025, at the age of 88, at his home in Beverly Hills, California. He was the last surviving principal cast member of Hogan's Heroes at the time of his death.

== Filmography ==
=== Film ===
Year	Title	Role	Notes
1956	The Birds and the Bees	Native	Uncredited
1969	Changes	Black Motorist	
1969	Hook, Line & Sinker	Bell Captain	Uncredited
1973	Westworld	Technician #2	
1981	Escape from DS-3		

=== Television ===
Year	Title	Role	Notes
1967	Daktari	Sergeant	Episode: "Miracle in the Jungle" (S 3:Ep 17)
1968	My Three Sons	Black Corporal	Episode: "Dear Enemy" (S 8:Ep 23)
1968–1969	Adam-12	Officer Miller	8 episodes
1968	Dragnet 1967	Officer Bill Bray	Episode: "Robbery - DR-15" (S 3:Ep 7)
1968	That Girl	Mr. Fern	Episode: "Should All our Old Acquaintances be Forgot" (S 3:Ep 13)
1969	Petticoat Junction	William R. 'Bill' Blake	Episode: "By the Book" (S 6:Ep 26)
1969	Star Trek	John B. Watkins	Episode: "That Which Survives" (S 3:Ep 17)
1969	The Name of the Game	Vincent Andrade	Episode: "The Suntan Mob" (S 1:Ep 20)
1970–1971	Hogan's Heroes	Sgt. Richard Baker	Main cast member for season 6
1970	Marcus Welby, M.D.	Billy Kincaid	Episode: "The Soft Phrase of Peace" (S 1:Ep 15)
1971	O'Hara, U.S. Treasury	Marv Dixon	Episode: "Operation: Time-Fuse" (S 1:Ep 5)
1972	Hec Ramsey	Cato Wilkins	Episode: "Hangman's Wages" (S 1:Ep 2)
1975	Police Story	Neeley's Partner	Episode: "The Cut Man Caper" (S 3:Ep 5)
1975	The Rockford Files	Guard	Episode: "2 Into 5.56 Won't Go" (S 2:Ep 10)
1981	Our Family Business	Harry	
1982	Money on the Side	Detective White	
1989	A Different World	Mercer Gilbert	Episode: "For Whom the Jingle Bell Tolls" (S 3:Ep 10)
