= The Mark of Gideon =

- Star Trek: The Original Series episode
- Episode no.: Season 3 Episode 16
- Directed by: Jud Taylor
- Written by: George F. Slavin; Stanley Adams
- Cinematography by: Al Francis
- Production code: 072
- Original air date: January 17, 1969

Guest appearances
- Sharon Acker - Odona; David Hurst - Ambassador Hodin; Eugene Dynarski - Krodak; Richard Derr - Admiral Fitzgerald; Frank da Vinci - Lt. Brent; William Blackburn - face on viewscreen (uncredited)

Episode chronology
← Previous "Let That Be Your Last Battlefield"	Next → "That Which Survives"
- Star Trek: The Original Series season 3

"The Mark of Gideon" is the sixteenth episode of the third season of the American science fiction television series Star Trek. Written by George F. Slavin and Stanley Adams and directed by Jud Taylor, it was first broadcast on January 17, 1969.

In the episode, a race of aliens from an overpopulated planet abduct Captain Kirk to solve their problem.

The episode was co-written by actor Stanley Adams, who portrayed Cyrano Jones in the Star Trek episode "The Trouble with Tribbles".

== Plot ==
The Federation starship Enterprise arrives at the planet Gideon to discuss diplomatic relations. The Gideons will permit only one representative, Captain Kirk, to set foot on their planet. Kirk beams down to the coordinates provided, but finds himself apparently still aboard the Enterprise, which is now devoid of any crew.

First Officer Spock is informed that the Captain has not arrived on the planet, but the Gideon Ambassador, Hodin, refuses to allow a search team to investigate. Neither Starfleet Command nor the Federation bureaucracy is of any help, each referring the matter to the other.

Meanwhile, Kirk wanders the deserted corridors and notices a strange bruise on his arm. He eventually encounters a beautiful young woman named Odona. She claims to have no idea how she got there, recalling only that she was in an overcrowded auditorium and struggling to breathe. For the moment, Odona is just relieved to have freedom of movement. Kirk insists that she must be from Gideon, but Odona denies any knowledge of the planet.

Kirk learns from Odona that her home planet is severely overpopulated, with crowds of people everywhere and no privacy, because death is rare. To her, the privilege of being alone, even for a moment, is a dream come true. Kirk is taken by Odona's beauty, and the two share a passionate kiss. Neither notice the image of two dozen faces appearing on the view screen behind them.

As Kirk and Odona leave the bridge, Kirk hears a strange sound outside the ship. He goes to a viewport and catches a glimpse of a crowd of people looking in. The scene quickly changes to a normal view of space. Kirk confronts Odona about what is going on, but she denies knowing what is happening. She then complains of a strange feeling and faints into Kirk's arms.

Kirk carries her to sick bay, where he encounters Ambassador Hodin, who informs him that Odona, his daughter, is suffering from Vegan choriomeningitis, having been infected with Kirk's blood, which carries the virus. Hodin's plan is to infect the Gideon population with the virus, shortening their immense lifespans and relieving the population problem. Kirk is to supply the virus, while Odona's death is to serve as an inspiration for future volunteers. Questioned about alternatives, Hodin explains that the Gideon people's regenerative abilities would foil sterilization attempts, and that other methods of birth control would never be accepted.

Having realized that Hodin has deceived him, Spock goes against Starfleet orders and beams down to Kirk's original coordinates. Once there, he finds a false Enterprise that was built to confuse Kirk. He soon reaches Kirk and Odona, and asks Hodin not to interfere as he, Spock, is in enough trouble already. Kirk, Spock, and Odona return to the real Enterprise, where Chief Medical Officer Dr. McCoy treats Odona's condition. Odona now plans to return to Gideon to supply the virus herself. Kirk forgives her for her deception.

== Production and reception ==
In 2017, Den of Geek ranked "The Mark of Gideon" as the 14th "best worst" Star Trek episode of the original series.

== Releases ==
This episode was released in Japan on December 21, 1993 as part of the complete season 3 LaserDisc set, Star Trek: Original Series log.3. A trailer for this and the other episodes was also included, and the episode had English and Japanese audio tracks. The cover script was スター・トレック TVサードシーズン

This episode was included in TOS Season 3 remastered DVD box set, with the remastered version of this episode.

== See also ==
- The Marching Morons – 1951 short story with mostly same plot
