= Let That Be Your Last Battlefield =

- Star Trek: The Original Series episode
- Episode no.: Season 3 Episode 15
- Directed by: Jud Taylor
- Story by: Lee Cronin
- Teleplay by: Oliver Crawford
- Cinematography by: Al Francis
- Production code: 070
- Original air date: January 10, 1969

Guest appearances
- Frank Gorshin – Commissioner Bele; Lou Antonio – Lokai; William Blackburn – Lt. Hadley

Episode chronology
← Previous "Whom Gods Destroy"	Next → "The Mark of Gideon"
- Star Trek: The Original Series season 3

"Let That Be Your Last Battlefield" is the fifteenth episode of the third season of the original American science fiction television show Star Trek. Written by Oliver Crawford (based on a story by Gene L. Coon, writing under his pen name "Lee Cronin") and directed by Jud Taylor, it was first broadcast January 10, 1969.

In the episode, the Enterprise encounters two survivors of a war-torn planet, each half black and half white (though on opposite sides from each other), each committed to destroying the other.

The episode guest-stars Lou Antonio and Frank Gorshin.

== Plot ==
The Federation starship Enterprise is on a mission to help decontaminate the polluted atmosphere of the planet Ariannus, when sensors detect a Federation shuttlecraft that was reported stolen. The craft is brought aboard along with its alien pilot, who identifies himself as Lokai, a political refugee from the planet Cheron. Lokai's most striking feature is that his skin is ink-black on one side of his body and chalk-white on the other.

Shortly thereafter, sensors detect another spacecraft in pursuit of the Enterprise. The alien craft disintegrates, but not before its pilot, Bele, transports to the Enterprise bridge. He is colored black and white, similar to Lokai. Bele explains that he is on a mission to retrieve political traitors. His current quarry is Lokai, whom he has been chasing for 50,000 Earth years. Bele is taken to Lokai, and the two begin to argue about the history of their peoples, including whether it was justified for Bele's people to dominate Lokai's people; the two men almost come to blows.

Bele demands that Captain Kirk take him and Lokai to Cheron. Kirk refuses, telling him he will have to make his case to Federation authorities. Some time later, the ship changes course to Cheron, and Bele announces that his "will" has taken control of the ship. When Lokai demands the death of Bele, Kirk orders both of them to be taken to the ship's brig, but a force field generated by both aliens makes that impossible. With no other way to regain control, Kirk threatens to destroy the Enterprise, and begins the ship's auto-destruct sequence. In the last seconds of the countdown, Bele relents, and the ship resumes its course to Ariannus.

As Bele continues angrily to press his matter with Starfleet, he reveals the source of his conflict with Lokai: All of Bele's people on Cheron are black on their right sides as he is, while Lokai's people are all white on their right sides. The importance of the distinction is lost on the ship's officers, who ask whether the original Cheronians were monochromatic like the crew of the Enterprise. To Bele's disgust, he is informed by Starfleet that his request to detain Lokai cannot be fulfilled because the Federation has no extradition treaties with Cheron.

Once the Ariannus mission is completed, Bele takes control of the Enterprise again, this time disabling the self-destruct system. When the ship arrives at Cheron, Spock can find no sign of intelligent life. Lokai and Bele realize they are each the only ones left of their peoples, who have completely annihilated themselves in civil war. Insane with mutual hatred, they attack each other, their force fields threatening to damage the ship. Lokai breaks away and Bele pursues him, both traumatically envisioning their destroyed planet as they run, and the two eventually beam down to the planet. The bridge crew remark sadly on their unwillingness to give up their hate.

== Production ==
The script for the story was developed from a story outline written by Gene L. Coon under his pen name Lee Cronin. This was Gene Coon's final episode.

Although Gene Roddenberry liked it, it was initially rejected by NBC studio executive Stanley Robertson. The look of the aliens Bele and Lokai was decided only a week before filming began, based on an offhand comment by director Jud Taylor. The half white-half black makeup led to criticism of the episode as heavy-handed.

The script evolved from an outline by Barry Trivers for a possible first-season episode called "A Portrait in Black and White". The script was accepted for the third season following budget cuts.

"Let That Be Your Last Battlefield" is significant in the Star Trek universe for the first appearance of a self-destruct system (as opposed to an improvised self-destruction process). It did not originate the concept, which appeared previously in the film Forbidden Planet (1956), but the self-destruct system has appeared as a plot device in many subsequent Star Trek stories. The self-destruction sequence codes 11A, 11A2B, 1B2B3 and the final code 000 destruct-0 from the episode were used again verbatim in Star Trek III: The Search For Spock to destroy Enterprise in that film.

== Reception ==
In 2010, SciFiNow ranked this the ninth best episode of the original series.

Zack Handlen of The A.V. Club gave the episode a "C+" rating, noting positively the aliens' makeup and some "good moments", but also noting that these were outweighed by an overpowering message. In their compendium of Star Trek reviews, Trek Navigator, Mark A. Altman and Edward Gross both rated the episode as mediocre, describing its message as obvious and heavy-handed. They did find some redeeming moments, such as the climactic chase to the ruined planet's surface and Gorshin's performance as Bele. This episode is noted as one of the top ten Star Trek episodes that takes on the topic of tolerance.

In 2016, The Hollywood Reporter rated "Let That Be Your Last Battlefield" the 11th best television episode of all Star Trek franchise television shows prior to Star Trek: Discovery including live-action and animated series but not counting the movies.

A 2016 article in The New Yorker noted that this episode was a dramatization about slavery and racism.

In 2017, ScreenRant ranked "Let That Be Your Last Battlefield" the 7th most optimistic episode of Star Trek television, pointing out the crew's reaction at the end.

In 2016, SyFy ranked guest stars Frank Gorshin and Lou Antonio (as Bele and Lokai, the black and white aliens), the 10th best guest stars on the original series.

In 2018, Collider ranked this episode the 12th best original series episode, and in the same year, PopMatters ranked this the 19th best episode of the original series.

In 2020, ScreenRant ranked it as the 10th best episode of TOS to re-watch. They note that as the two characters are introduced, each appears half-black and half-white, but the Enterprise crew does not understand the feud between the two characters.

== Releases ==
On March 22, 1981, this episode was released on CED VideoDisc, with "The City on the Edge of Forever" on the flip side of the disc.

This episode was released in Japan on December 21, 1993, as part of the complete season 3 LaserDisc set, Star Trek: Original Series log.3. A trailer for this and the other episodes was also included, and the episode had English and Japanese audio tracks. The cover script was スター・トレック TVサードシーズン

This episode was included in TOS Season 3 remastered DVD box set, with the remastered version of this episode.
