= That Which Survives =

- Star Trek episode
- Episode no.: Season 3 Episode 17
- Directed by: Herb Wallerstein
- Story by: Michael Richards
- Teleplay by: John Meredyth Lucas
- Cinematography by: Al Francis
- Production code: 069
- Original air date: January 24, 1969

Guest appearances
- Lee Meriwether – Losira; Arthur Batanides – Lt. D'Amato; Booker Bradshaw – Dr. M'Benga; William Blackburn – Lt. Hadley; Naomi Pollack – Lt. Rahda; Kenneth Washington – Engineer John B. Watkins; Brad Forrest – Ensign Wyatt

Episode chronology
← Previous "The Mark of Gideon"	Next → "The Lights of Zetar"
- Star Trek: The Original Series season 3

"That Which Survives" is the seventeenth episode of the third season of the American science fiction television series Star Trek. Written by John Meredyth Lucas (based on a story by D.C. Fontana under the pseudonym Michael Richards) and directed by Herb Wallerstein, it was first broadcast January 24, 1969.

In the episode, the crew of the Enterprise visit an abandoned planet guarded by a mysterious woman.

== Plot ==
The Enterprise discovers a planet whose young age is inconsistent with its atmosphere and biology. As Captain Kirk, Dr. McCoy, Lt. Sulu and geologist D'Amato beam down, a woman appears in the transporter room, touches the transporter technician, and kills him instantly. As the landing party materializes, the surface of the planet is rocked by a violent tremor. Communication with the Enterprise is lost, leaving them stranded.

At the same time, the Enterprise finds itself 990.7 light years from the planet. First Officer Spock orders the Enterprise back to the planet. Dr. M'Benga determines the cause of the transporter officer's death to be cellular disruption.

The landing party splits up and explores their surroundings. As D'Amato surveys a rocky area, he comes face-to-face with the woman who appeared in the transporter room. After listing off his name and professional record, she says, "I am for you," and touches D'Amato, killing him. A failed attempt to cut a grave for D'Amato proves that the planet is artificial.

Chief Engineer Scott, sensing something wrong, orders Engineer Watkins to check equipment in a secluded area. The mysterious woman appears, kills Watkins, and disappears again.

The woman appears to Sulu and attempts to touch him, but only brushes his shoulder with her fingertips. Sulu's screams of pain bring Kirk and McCoy, who find him injured but alive. The woman touches Kirk's shoulder without effect. She then disappears. They conclude that she can only kill the person she specifically names.

The ship begins to accelerate uncontrollably, and Scott discovers the emergency overload bypass has been sabotaged. Scott estimates that the ship will explode in 15 minutes if not brought back under control. Spock suggests manually cutting the matter-antimatter fuel flow to the warp engines. Scott begins the procedure as the Enterprise passes warp 13.2. Scott stops the matter–antimatter flow at the last second, just as the ship hit warp 14.1 and the ship continues its course to the planet.

On the planet, the woman appears again, announcing she is "for Kirk", but Sulu and McCoy block her path. Questioned by Kirk, the woman says she is Losira, the station commander. She is alone, and her only purpose is to defend the planet from intruders. Kirk's questions unsettle her and she vanishes. Strong power emanations lead the landing party to a hidden entrance in a rock face. Passing into the hidden chamber, the landing party find a glowing computer. Three copies of Losira enter, one each for Kirk, Sulu, and McCoy. As they approach, Spock and a security officer materialize, and, at Kirk's command, destroy the computer. The three Losiras vanish.

A projected image of Losira then appears on a wall, informing her fellow Kalandans that a disease has killed the station's personnel, and that the computer has been defending the station against intruders. McCoy surmises that the disease eventually wiped out the entire Kalandan species, and Spock suggests that the computer used images of Losira to do the job of defense. Kirk concludes that the landing party survived because the reproductions were so perfect that they experienced regret about killing.

== Production ==
The original story outline was written by D.C. Fontana under the pseudonym Michael Richards. In this outline called "Survival", Losira is more brutal, encouraging the crew to turn on each other and fight.

This is the second appearance of Naomi Pollack on Star Trek, this time as Lieutenant Rahda, taking Sulu's place at the helm. Previously she played one of the natives in "The Paradise Syndrome".

Booker Bradshaw as Dr. M'Benga previously appeared in the Season 2 episode "A Private Little War".

== Reception ==
In a 2010 review, Zack Handlen of The A.V. Club gave the episode a B. He found the stranding of the landing party a refreshing predicament for the series, and praised the depiction of both Spock's strengths and weaknesses as a commander, but questioned why the planet's defense system was so needlessly aggressive, and called the ending an unsatisfying info-dump.

== Releases ==
This episode was released in Japan on December 21, 1993 as part of the complete season 3 LaserDisc set, Star Trek: Original Series log.3. A trailer for this and the other episodes was also included, and the episode had English and Japanese audio tracks.

This episode was included in TOS Season 3 remastered DVD box set, with the remastered version of this episode.
