= Arthur H. Singer =

- Born: Arthur Harold Singer; February 16, 1910; Harrison, New Jersey, U.S.
- Died: March 19, 1978 (aged 68); Los Angeles, California, U.S.
- Occupation(s): Television producer, writer, story editor
- Years active: 1957–1970
- Spouse: Mary Tarcai

Arthur Harold Singer (February 16, 1910 – March 19, 1978) was a producer, writer, and story editor in American television from the 1950s into the 1970s. Born in Harrison, New Jersey, he is best known for his work as story editor of the third season of the original series of Star Trek. Working under producer Fred Freiberger, he edited or rewrote 23 of that season's 24 episodes, and got a writer's credit for "Turnabout Intruder", the last episode filmed, which was based on a story by Gene Roddenberry. Like Freiberger, who was also hired by Roddenberry, Singer was unfamiliar with the show when he took the job, despite it having been on the air for a year and a half. It took him some time to get up to speed on the concept and characters, but he was able to bring many scripts and stories up to a producible standard, given the restrictions of time and budget. He left the television industry shortly after his involvement with Star Trek, and died in 1978.

== Career ==
Singer was the producer of the TV series Decoy (also known as Policewoman Decoy), which filmed 29 episodes in 1957–59. He went on to work as associate producer for 30 episodes of Cain's Hundred in 1961–62, taking the same job in The Murder Men in 1962. He had also worked as a story editor.

=== Star Trek TOS Third Season ===
Singer is best known for his work on the third and final season of the original series of Star Trek. When Freiberger was hired by Roddenberry to produce the third season of Star Trek, there was no story editor in place. Dorothy Fontana and John Meredyth Lucas had both given up the job during the second season. According to a letter to Isaac Asimov on May 7, 1968, Roddenberry stated that he had hired Singer based on his previous work for “Studio One, US Steel Hour, and many other fine shows.” These were both anthology shows, not series.

Neither Freiberger nor Singer had any familiarity with the series. Fontana told how Singer, early on, entered the set of the Transporter Room, and asked, “How does this thing work?” During their rewriting of "The Enterprise Incident", written by Fontana, Singer was directed by Freiberger to script a love scene for Spock and the Romulan Commander which involved kisses and embraces. Fontana objected strongly (as did Leonard Nimoy), going over Freiberger's head to Roddenberry, who ordered the offending scene revised. However, by midway through the season, Singer had grasped the concept and the characters, and many of his rewrites, especially those of new writers, brought the scripts more in line with the established parameters. In his rewrite of "That Which Survives", as an example, he was responsible for roughly 40 percent of the spoken words in the broadcast version.

=== Later career ===
Singer was married to Mary Tarcai. Immediately following Star Trek he became the executive story editor on Hawaii Five-O for one season. He also sold a story idea to Robert Justman for the series Then Came Bronson. Singer retired from television shortly thereafter. He died in Los Angeles, California, on March 19, 1978, at the age of 68.
