= Herb Wallerstein =

- Born: Herbert Wallerstein; November 28, 1925; New York City, New York, U.S.
- Died: September 27, 1985 (aged 59); Los Angeles, California, U.S.
- Occupations: Director, production manager
- Years active: 1954–1984
- Children: 2
- Relatives: Rowe Wallerstein (brother)

Herbert Wallerstein (November 28, 1925 – September 27, 1985) was an American director and producer. He was known for involvement in shows such as The Adventures of Rin Tin Tin, Father Knows Best, I Dream of Jeannie, and Mannix. He was also the older brother of Rowe Wallerstein.

== Career ==
Wallerstein's career began as assistant director for TV's The Adventures of Rin Tin Tin in 1954. After two years, Wallerstein left Tin Tin and had several assistant directing stints in several movies before being hired to the directing staff of the television series Circus Boy. He also served as a director on the television series Star Trek in the 1960s.

He also had producing credits for I Dream of Jeannie and several television movies in the 1970s.

In 1978, Wallerstein began working for 20th Century Fox. He served as the senior vice president of feature film production. He oversaw the production of films such as Alien, 9 to 5 and The Verdict. He retired from Fox in the winter of 1984.

== Death ==
On the evening of September 27, 1985, Wallerstein went to the supermarket. When he returned, he and the family housekeeper, Mayra Melenez Lopez, an immigrant from El Salvador, had a struggle. According to Lopez, Wallerstein had assaulted her several times that night. Lopez claimed he had thrown ice cream in her face and pummeled her repeatedly, giving her a black eye. After that, Lopez arose from the kitchen floor and proceeded to hit Wallerstein in the head with a baseball bat. To cover up the slaying, Lopez and her boyfriend dragged Wallerstein's body to the boyfriend's car and drove two blocks. The car was then set ablaze and was discovered by firefighters on September 29.

On November 26, 1985, Lopez was arrested and, on the 28th, arraigned on murder. According to Los Angeles Police Detective Joseph Diglio, Lopez was a suspect from the beginning of the investigation. Her arrest came after several personal objects of Wallerstein's, including his wallet, identification and credit cards, were found buried near the Wallerstein home.

On December 11, 1985, a preliminary hearing for Lopez was held at the Van Nuys Municipal Court. Superior Court Judge James A. Albracht reduced Lopez's charge from murder to manslaughter ruling that "...the prosecution had presented insufficient evidence ... to show that Lopez had acted with premeditation and malice."

Lopez's trial was held in July 1986. After two and a half days of deliberation, on July 16, a jury at the Van Nuys superior court found Lopez not guilty of voluntary and involuntary manslaughter and charges of arson in Wallerstein's death. Lopez then reportedly placed her head in the chest of her lawyer, Deputy Public Defender Mark Lessom and whispered "Thank you".

== Personal life ==
Wallerstein's friends described him as a "deeply religious Jew".
