= Star Trek: The Original Series =

American sci-fi TV series (1966–1969)

- Also known as: Star Trek
- Genre: Action; Adventure; Science fiction
- Created by: Gene Roddenberry
- Showrunners: Gene Roddenberry; Gene L. Coon; John Meredyth Lucas; Fred Freiberger
- Starring: William Shatner; Leonard Nimoy; DeForest Kelley
- Theme music composer: Alexander Courage
- Opening theme: "Theme from Star Trek"
- Country of origin: United States
- Original language: English
- No. of seasons: 3
- No. of episodes: 79 (Note: This number does not include the original pilot episode "The Cage".) (list of episodes)

Production
- Executive producer: Gene Roddenberry
- Producers: Gene L. Coon; John Meredyth Lucas; Fred Freiberger
- Running time: 51 minutes
- Production companies: Desilu Productions; Paramount Television; Norway Productions
- Budget: Per episode: Season 1: $190,000 (Note: Equivalent to $1.9 million in 2025); Season 2: $185,000; Season 3: $175,000

Original release
- Network: NBC
- Release: September 6, 1966 – June 3, 1969

Related
- Star Trek TV series; Star Trek: The Animated Series; Star Trek: Strange New Worlds

Star Trek is an American science fiction television series created by Gene Roddenberry that follows the adventures of the starship USS Enterprise (NCC-1701) and its crew. It acquired the retronym of Star Trek: The Original Series (TOS) to distinguish the show within the media franchise that it began.

The show is set in the Milky Way galaxy, c. 2266–2269. The ship and crew are led by Captain James T. Kirk (William Shatner), First Officer and Science Officer Spock (Leonard Nimoy) and Chief Medical Officer Leonard H. "Bones" McCoy (DeForest Kelley). Each episode starts with the "Where no man has gone before" speech.

Norway Productions and Desilu Productions produced the series from September 1966 to December 1967. Paramount Television produced the show from January 1968 to June 1969. Star Trek aired on NBC from September 8, 1966, to June 3, 1969. It was first broadcast on September 6, 1966, on Canada's CTV network. While on NBC, Star Trek's Nielsen ratings were low and the network canceled it after three seasons and 79 episodes. In the United Kingdom, the series was not broadcast until July 12, 1969, when it was shown on the BBC One television network, coinciding with the Apollo 11 mission to land the first humans on the Moon. Through broadcast syndication, it became an international success in the 1970s, achieving cult classic status and a developing influence on popular culture. Star Trek eventually spawned a media franchise consisting of 13 television series, 14 feature films, and numerous books, games, and toys, and is now widely considered one of the most popular and influential television series of all time.

As of 2026, following the death of Walter Koenig, there are currently only 2 surviving primary cast members, those being Shatner and George Takei.

== Creation ==
On March 11, 1964, Gene Roddenberry, a long-time fan of science fiction, drafted a short treatment for a science-fiction television series that he called Star Trek. This was to be set on board a large starship named S.S. Yorktown in the 23rd century bearing a crew dedicated to exploring the Milky Way galaxy.

Roddenberry noted a number of influences on his idea, some of which include A. E. van Vogt's tales of the spaceship Space Beagle, Eric Frank Russell's Marathon series of stories, and the film Forbidden Planet (1956). Some have also drawn parallels with the television series Rocky Jones, Space Ranger (1954), a space opera that included many of the elements integral to Star Trek—the organization, crew relationships, missions, part of the bridge layout, and some technology. Roddenberry also drew heavily from C. S. Forester's Horatio Hornblower novels that depict a daring sea captain who exercises broad discretionary authority on distant sea missions of noble purpose. He often humorously referred to Captain Kirk as "Horatio Hornblower in Space".

Roddenberry had extensive experience in writing for series about the Old West that had been popular television fare in the 1950s and 1960s. Armed with this background, he characterized the new show in his first draft as "Wagon Train to the stars". Like the familiar Wagon Train, each episode was to be a self-contained adventure story, set within the structure of a continuing voyage through space.

In Roddenberry's original concept, the protagonist was Captain Robert April of the starship S.S. Yorktown. This character was developed into Captain Christopher Pike, first portrayed by Jeffrey Hunter. April is listed in the Star Trek Chronology, The Star Trek Encyclopedia, and at startrek.com as the Enterprise's first commanding officer, preceding Captain Pike. The character's only television/movie appearance was in the Star Trek: The Animated Series episode "The Counter-Clock Incident", until Star Trek: Strange New Worlds, where he is portrayed by Adrian Holmes.

Lloyd Bridges was offered a starring role on what became Star Trek. Bridges declined, saying he got along well with Roddenberry on a personal level but had no desire to work in science fiction.

== Development ==
In April 1964, Roddenberry presented the Star Trek draft to Desilu Productions, a leading independent television production company. He met with Herbert F. Solow, Desilu's director of production. Solow saw promise in the idea and signed a three-year program-development contract with Roddenberry. Lucille Ball, head of Desilu, was not familiar with the nature of the project, but she was instrumental in getting the pilot produced.

The concept was extensively revised and fleshed out during this time—"The Cage" pilot filmed in late 1964 differs in many respects from the March 1964 treatment. Solow, for example, added the "stardate" concept. Desilu Productions had a first-look deal with CBS. Oscar Katz, Desilu's Vice President of Production, went with Roddenberry to pitch the series to the network. They refused to purchase the show, as they already had a similar program in development, the 1965 Irwin Allen series Lost in Space.

In May 1964, Solow, who had previously worked at NBC, met with Grant Tinker, then head of the network's West Coast programming department. Tinker commissioned the first pilot—which became "The Cage". NBC turned down the resulting pilot, stating that it was "too cerebral". However, the NBC executives were still impressed with the concept, and they understood that its perceived faults had been partly due to the script that they had selected themselves.

NBC made the unusual decision to pay for a second pilot, using the script called "Where No Man Has Gone Before". Only the character of Spock, played by Leonard Nimoy, was retained from the first pilot, and only two cast members, Majel Barrett and Nimoy, were carried forward into the series. This second pilot proved to be satisfactory to NBC, and the network selected Star Trek to be in its upcoming television schedule for the fall of 1966.

The second pilot introduced most of the other main characters: Captain Kirk (William Shatner), Chief Engineer Lt. Commander Scott (James Doohan) and Lt. Sulu (George Takei), who served as a physicist on the ship in the second pilot, but subsequently became a helmsman throughout the rest of the series. Paul Fix played Dr. Mark Piper in the second pilot; ship's doctor Leonard McCoy (DeForest Kelley) joined the cast when filming began for the first season, and he remained for the rest of the series, achieving billing as the third star of the series. Also joining the ship's permanent crew during the first season were the communications officer, Lt. Nyota Uhura (Nichelle Nichols), the first African-American woman to hold such an important role in an American television series; the captain's yeoman, Janice Rand (Grace Lee Whitney), who departed midway through the first season; and Christine Chapel (Majel Barrett), the ship's nurse and assistant to McCoy. Walter Koenig joined the cast as Ensign Pavel Chekov in the series' second season. Majel Barrett would later marry Gene Roddenberry. She was the voice of the computer in Star Trek: The Next Generation, amongst other series. She also played Lwaxana Troi, mother of Next Gen's Deanna Troi (Marina Sirtis).

In February 1966, before the first episode was aired, Star Trek was nearly canceled by Desilu Productions. Desilu had gone from making just one half-hour show (The Lucy Show) to deficit-financing a portion of two expensive hour-long shows, Mission: Impossible and Star Trek. Solow was able to convince Lucille Ball that both shows should continue.

== Production ==
The original starship Enterprise

Once the series had been picked up by NBC, the production moved to what was then Desilu Productions' Gower Street location. It had previously been the main studio complex used by RKO Pictures and is now part of the Paramount Pictures lot. The series used what are now stages 31 and 32. The show's production staff included art director Matt Jefferies, who designed the starship Enterprise and most of its interiors. His contributions to the series were honored in the name of the "Jefferies tube", an equipment shaft depicted in various Star Trek series. In addition to working with his brother, John Jefferies, to create the hand-held phaser weapons of Star Trek, Jefferies also developed the set design for the bridge of the Enterprise (which was based on an earlier design by Pato Guzman). Jefferies used his practical experience as an airman during World War II and his knowledge of aircraft design to devise a functional and ergonomic bridge layout.

The costume designer for Star Trek, Bill Theiss, created the look of the Starfleet uniforms for the Enterprise crew as well as the costumes for female guest stars and for various aliens, including the Klingons, Vulcans, Romulans, Tellarites, Andorians, and Gideonites.

Artist and sculptor Wah Chang, who had worked for Walt Disney Productions, was hired to design and manufacture props: he created the flip-open communicator, often credited as having influenced the configuration of the portable version of the cellular telephone. Chang also designed the portable sensing-recording-computing "tricorder" device, and various fictitious devices for the starship's engineering crew and its sick bay. As the series progressed, he helped to create various memorable aliens, such as the Gorn and the Horta.

=== Season 1 (1966–1967) ===
Title used for the first season

NBC ordered 16 episodes of Star Trek, besides "Where No Man Has Gone Before". The first regular episode of Star Trek, "The Man Trap", aired on Thursday, September 8, 1966, from 8:30 to 9:30 as part of an NBC "sneak preview" block. Reviews were mixed; while The Philadelphia Inquirer and San Francisco Chronicle liked the new show, The New York Times and The Boston Globe were less favorable, and Variety predicted that it "won't work", calling it "an incredible and dreary mess of confusion and complexities". Debuting against mostly reruns, Star Trek easily won its time slot with a 40.6 share. The following week against new programming, however, the show fell to second (29.4 share) behind CBS. It ranked 33rd (out of 94 programs) over the next two weeks, then the following two episodes ranked 51st in the ratings.

I am an avid fan of Star Trek, and would simply die if it was taken off the air. In my opinion it is the best show on television.

— M.P., Oswego, New York, February 20, 1967

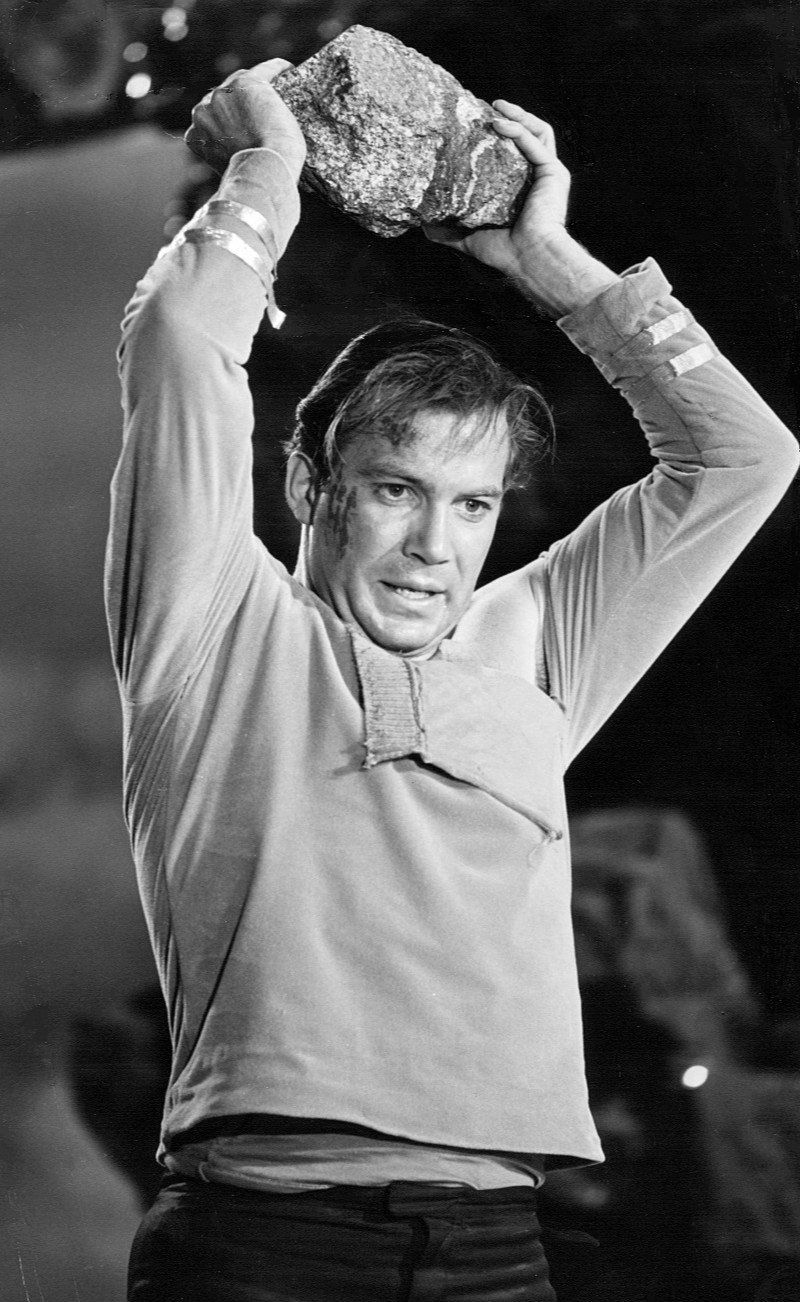
William Shatner as Captain James T. Kirk in action, from the episode "Where No Man Has Gone Before", 1966

Frederik Pohl, editor of Galaxy Science Fiction, wrote in February 1967 of his amazement that Star Trek's "regular shows were just as good" as the early episodes that won an award at Tricon in September. Believing that the show would soon be canceled because of low ratings, he lamented that it "made the mistake of appealing to a comparatively literate group", and urged readers to write letters to help save the show. Star Trek's first-season ratings would in earlier years likely have caused NBC to cancel the show. The network had pioneered research into viewers' demographic profiles in the early 1960s, however, and by 1967, it and other networks increasingly considered such data when making decisions; for example, CBS temporarily canceled Gunsmoke that year because it had too many older and too few younger viewers. Although Roddenberry later claimed that NBC was unaware of Star Trek's favorable demographics, awareness of Star Trek's "quality" audience is what likely caused the network to retain the show after the first and second seasons. NBC instead decided to order 10 more new episodes for the first season, and order a second season in March 1967. The network originally announced that the show would air at 7:30–8:30 pm Tuesday, but it was instead given an 8:30–9:30 pm Friday slot when the 1967–68 NBC schedule was released, making it less appealing to young adult viewers.

=== Season 2 (1967–1968) ===
Star Trek's ratings continued to decline during the second season. Although Shatner expected the show to end after two seasons and began to prepare for other projects, NBC nonetheless may have never seriously considered canceling the show. As early as January 1968, the Associated Press reported that Star Trek's chances for renewal for a third season were "excellent". The show had better ratings for NBC than ABC's competing Hondo, and the competing CBS programs (number-three Gomer Pyle, U.S.M.C. and the first half-hour of the number-12 CBS Friday Night Movie) were in the top 15 in the Nielsen ratings. Again, demographics helped Star Trek survive. Contrary to popular belief among its fans, the show did not have a larger audience of young viewers than its competition while on NBC. The network's research did indicate that Star Trek had a "quality audience" including "upper-income, better-educated males", however, and other NBC shows had lower overall ratings.

Look! Look! It doesn't stop! They're lined up all the way down the street!

— Norman Lunenfeld, NBC executive, on the mail trucks delivering Star Trek fans' letters

The enthusiasm of Star Trek's viewers surprised NBC. The show was unusual in its serious discussion of contemporary societal issues in a futuristic context, unlike Lost in Space, which was more campy in nature. The network had already received 29,000 fan letters for the show during its first season, more than for any other except The Monkees. When rumors spread in late 1967 that Star Trek was at risk of cancellation, Roddenberry secretly began and funded an effort by Bjo Trimble, her husband John, and other fans to persuade tens of thousands of viewers to write letters of support to save the program. Using the 4,000 names on a mailing list for a science-fiction convention, the Trimbles asked fans to write to NBC and ask 10 others to also do so. NBC received almost 116,000 letters for the show between December 1967 and March 1968, including more than 52,000 in February alone; according to an NBC executive, the network received more than one million pieces of mail but only disclosed the 116,000 figure. Newspaper columnists encouraged readers to write letters to help save what one called "the best science-fiction show on the air". More than 200 Caltech students marched to NBC's Burbank, California studio to support Star Trek in January 1968, carrying signs such as "Draft Spock" and "Vulcan Power". Berkeley and MIT students organized similar protests in San Francisco and New York City.

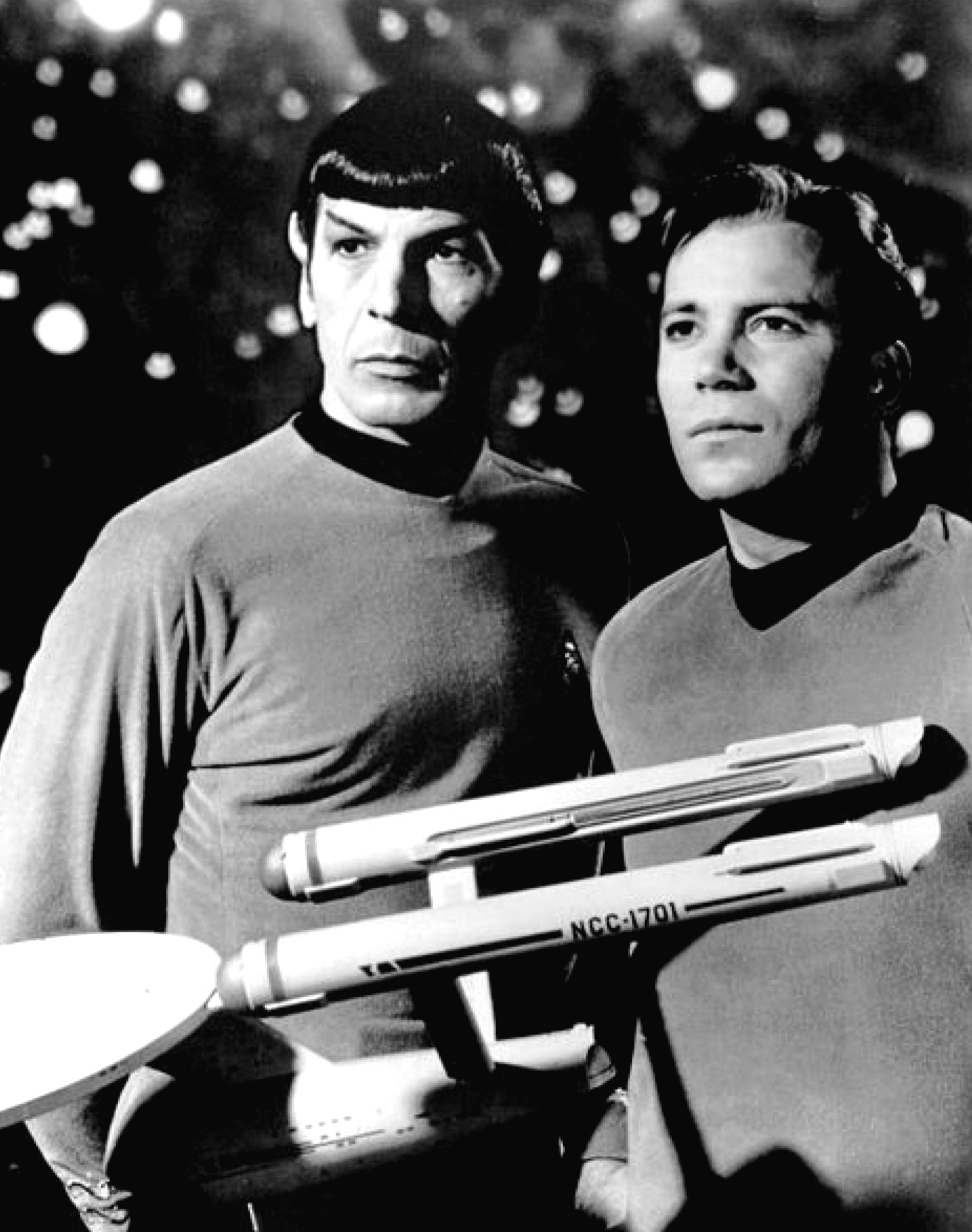
Spock, Kirk and the Enterprise, 1968

The letters supporting Star Trek, whose authors included New York State Governor Nelson Rockefeller, were different in both quantity and quality from most mail that television networks receive:

The show, according to the 6,000 letters it draws a week (more than any other in television), is watched by scientists, museum curators, psychiatrists, doctors, university professors, and other highbrows. The Smithsonian Institution asked for a print of the show for its archives, the only show so honored.

In addition:

Much of the mail came from doctors, scientists, teachers, and other professional people, and was for the most part literate–and written on good stationery. And if there is anything a network wants almost as much as a high Nielsen ratings, it is the prestige of a show that appeals to the upper middle class and high-brow audiences.

And now an announcement of interest to all viewers of Star Trek. We are pleased to tell you that Star Trek will continue to be seen on NBC Television. We know you will be looking forward to seeing the weekly adventure in space on Star Trek.

— NBC announcer, March 1, 1968

NBC—which used such anecdotes in much of its publicity for the show—made the unusual decision to announce on television, after the episode "The Omega Glory" on March 1, 1968, that the series had been renewed. The announcement implied a request to stop writing—NBC's policy of replying to each viewer mail meant that the campaign cost the network millions of dollars—but instead caused fans to send letters of thanks in similar numbers.

=== Season 3 (1968–1969) ===
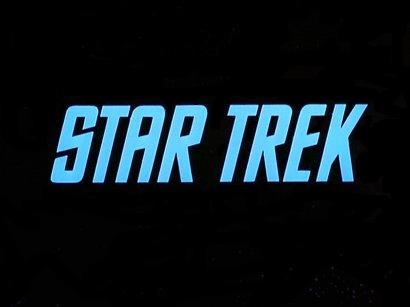
Intro of Season 3

NBC at first planned to move Star Trek to Mondays for the show's third season, likely in hopes of increasing its audience after the enormous letter campaign that surprised the network. In March 1968, however, NBC instead moved the show to 10:00 pm Friday night, an hour undesirable for its younger audience, so as not to conflict with the highly successful Rowan & Martin's Laugh-In on Monday evenings, from whose time slot Laugh-In producer George Schlatter had angrily demanded it not be rescheduled. In addition to the undesirable time slot, Star Trek was now being seen on only 181 of NBC's 210 affiliates.

Roddenberry was frustrated, and complained, "If the network wants to kill us, it couldn't make a better move." He attempted to persuade NBC to give Star Trek a better day and hour, but was not successful. As a result of this and his own growing exhaustion, he chose to withdraw from the stress of the daily production of Star Trek, though he remained nominally in charge as its "executive producer". Roddenberry reduced his direct involvement in Star Trek before the start of the 1968–69 television season, and was replaced by Fred Freiberger as the producer of the television series. Arthur H. Singer served as story editor. NBC next reduced Star Trek's budget from $185,000 per episode in season 2 (it was $190,000 per episode in season 1) to $175,000 per episode in season 3 (as the per-minute commercial price had dropped from $39,000 to $36,000 compared to the season-two time slot). This caused what some perceive as a decline in quality for the 1968–69 season, although there was a trade off in some lower production costs since the special effects technology had improved over time. By season 3 William Shatner felt that the main characters had become more compromised or exaggerated and the story lines more improbable. Leonard Nimoy felt that financial concerns dominated. Associate Producer Bob Justman, who left during the third season, said budget cuts caused the crew to become necessarily limited in the type of filming that could be done, such as outdoor work, with only one episode, "The Paradise Syndrome", shot largely outdoors. Nichelle Nichols described the budget-cutting during the final year as an intentional effort to kill off Star Trek:

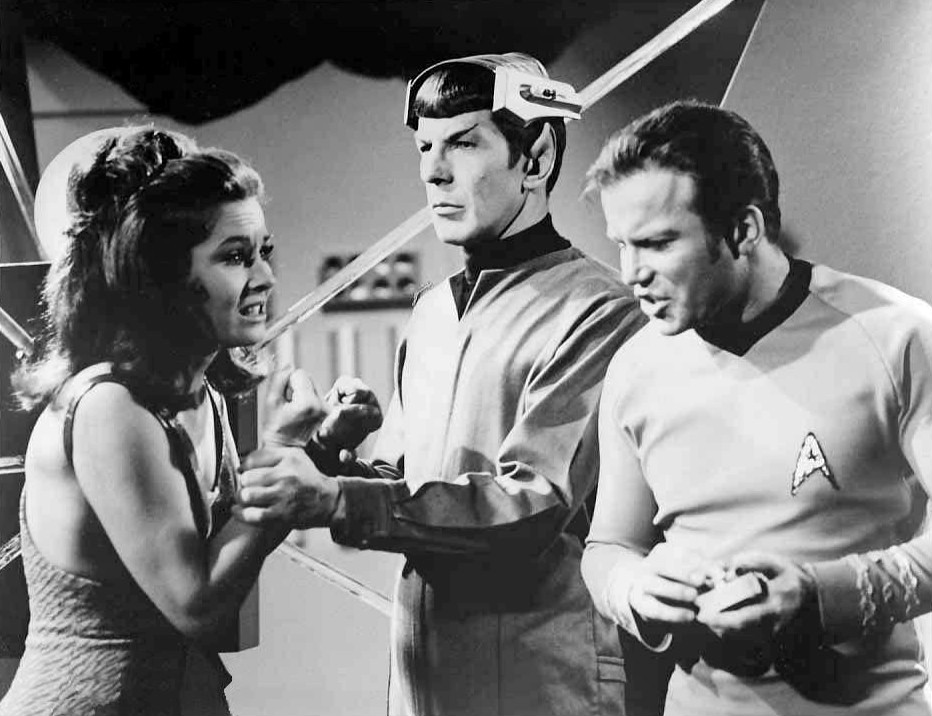
"Spock's Brain" was the first episode of the third season.

While NBC paid lip service to expanding Star Trek's audience, it [now] slashed our production budget until it was actually 10% lower than it had been in our first season ... This is why in the third season you saw fewer outdoor location shots, for example. Top writers, top guest stars, top anything you needed was harder to come by. Thus, Star Trek's demise became a self-fulfilling prophecy. And I can assure you, that is exactly as it was meant to be.

The last day of filming for Star Trek was January 9, 1969, and after 79 episodes NBC canceled the show in February despite fans' attempt at another letter-writing campaign. One newspaper columnist advised a protesting viewer:

You Star Trek fans have fought the "good fight", but the show has been cancelled and there's nothing to be done now.

In 2011, the decision to cancel Star Trek by NBC was ranked number four on the TV Guide Network special, 25 Biggest TV Blunders 2.

=== Syndication ===
Surprisingly, one show no longer programmed by a network but syndicated to local television stations (Star Trek) sometimes appeared among the top-five favorites in areas where the show is carried.

— "Students rate television", 1971

Although some of the third season's episodes were considered of poorer quality, it gave Star Trek enough episodes for television syndication. Most shows require at least four seasons for syndication, because otherwise not enough episodes are available for daily stripping. Kaiser Broadcasting, however, purchased syndication rights for Star Trek during the first season for its stations in several large cities. The company arranged the unusual deal because it saw the show as effective counterprogramming against the Big Three networks' 6 pm evening news programs. Paramount began advertising the reruns in trade press in March 1969; as Kaiser's ratings were good, other stations, such as WPIX in New York City and Kaiser's WKBS in Philadelphia, also purchased the episodes for similar counterprogramming.

Through syndication, Star Trek found a larger audience than it had on NBC, becoming a cult classic. Airing the show in the late afternoon or early evening attracted many new viewers, often young. By 1970, Paramount's trade advertisements claimed that the show had significantly improved its stations' ratings, and the Los Angeles Times commented on Star Trek's ability to "acquire the most enviable ratings in the syndication field". By 1972, what the Associated Press described as "the show that won't die" aired in more than 100 American cities and 60 other countries; and more than 3,000 fans attended the first Star Trek convention in New York City in January 1972.

Since that dark day in 1969 when NBC brought the programming hammer down on Star Trek, there probably hasn't been a 24-hour period when the original program, one of the original episodes, wasn't being aired somewhere.

— Chicago Tribune, 1987

Fans of the show became increasingly organized, gathering at conventions to trade merchandise, meet actors from the show, and watch screenings of old episodes. Such fans came to be known as "trekkies", who were noted (and often ridiculed) for their extreme devotion to the show and their encyclopedic knowledge of every episode. Because fans enjoyed re-watching each episode many times, prices for Star Trek rose over time, instead of falling like other syndicated reruns. People magazine commented in 1977 that the show "threatens to rerun until the universe crawls back into its little black hole". By 1986, 17 years after entering syndication, Star Trek was the most popular syndicated series; by 1987, Paramount made $1 million from each episode; and by 1994, the reruns still aired in 94% of the United States.

From September 1 to December 24, 1998, the Sci-Fi Channel broadcast a "Special Edition" of all the original series episodes in an expanded 90-minute format hosted by William Shatner. Now titled Star Trek: The Original Series, these broadcasts restored scenes that had been edited out of the syndicated episodes. In addition to introductory and post-episode commentary by Shatner, the episodes included interviews with members of the regular production team and cast, writers, guest stars, and critics (titled as "Star Trek Insights"). The episodes were broadcast in the original broadcast sequence, followed by "The Cage", to which a full 105-minute segment was devoted. (For details on each episode's original airdate, see List of Star Trek: The Original Series episodes.) Leonard Nimoy hosted a second run from December 28, 1998, to March 24, 1999, but not all the episodes were broadcast because the show was abruptly canceled before completion.

=== Remastered edition ===
To celebrate the series' 40th anniversary in September 2006, CBS Paramount Domestic Television (now known as CBS Media Ventures, the current rights holders for the Star Trek television franchises) began syndication of an enhanced version of Star Trek: The Original Series in high definition with new CGI visual effects.

Under the direction of Star Trek producer David Rossi, who consulted with Mike and Denise Okuda, the visual and special effects were recreated to give Star Trek: The Original Series a more modern look. Special attention was given to such elements as the Enterprise, alien planets and their images depicted from space, planets seen from orbit, alien spacecraft, and technology such as computer readouts, viewscreen images, and phaser beams.

The restoration and enhancement was performed by CBS Digital. All live-action footage was scanned in high definition from its first-generation 35 mm film elements. While it was possible to retouch and remaster some visual effects, all new exterior ship, space, and planet shots were recreated under the supervision of Niel Wray.

"Original camera negatives" were used for all live-action footage, but not for external shots of the ship and planets. Notable changes include new space shots with a CGI Enterprise, and other new models (for example, a Gorn ship is shown in "Arena"), redone matte background shots, and other minor touches such as tidying up viewscreens.

A small number of scenes were also recomposed, and sometimes new actors were placed into the background of shots. The opening theme music was also re-recorded in digital stereo.

The first episode to be released to syndication was "Balance of Terror" on the weekend of September 16, 2006. Episodes were released at the rate of about one a week and broadcast in a 4:3 aspect ratio. Despite the HD remastering, CBS delivered the broadcast syndication package in Standard Definition (SD TV). The HD format was made commercially available through Blu-ray, or by streaming and downloads.

While the CGI shots were mastered in a 16:9 aspect ratio for future applications, they were initially broadcast in the United States and Canada—along with the live-action footage—in a 4:3 aspect ratio to respect the show's original composition.

On July 26, 2007, CBS Home Entertainment (with distribution by Paramount Home Entertainment) announced that the remastered episodes of TOS would be released on an HD DVD/DVD hybrid format. Season one was released on November 20, 2007. Season two had been scheduled for release in the summer of 2008, but it was canceled when Toshiba (which had been helping finance the remastering of the show) pulled out of the HD DVD business. On August 5, 2008, the remastered season two was released on DVD only. Season 3 was released on DVD on November 18, 2008. On February 17, 2009, Paramount announced the season one of TOS on Blu-ray Disc for a May release to coincide with the new feature film coming from Paramount. The second season was released in a seven disc set on Blu-ray in the United States on September 22, 2009. The third season was released on Blu-ray in the United States on December 15. With the release of the "Alternate Realities" box set, remastered Original Series episodes were included in a multi-series compilation for the first time.

== Cast ==
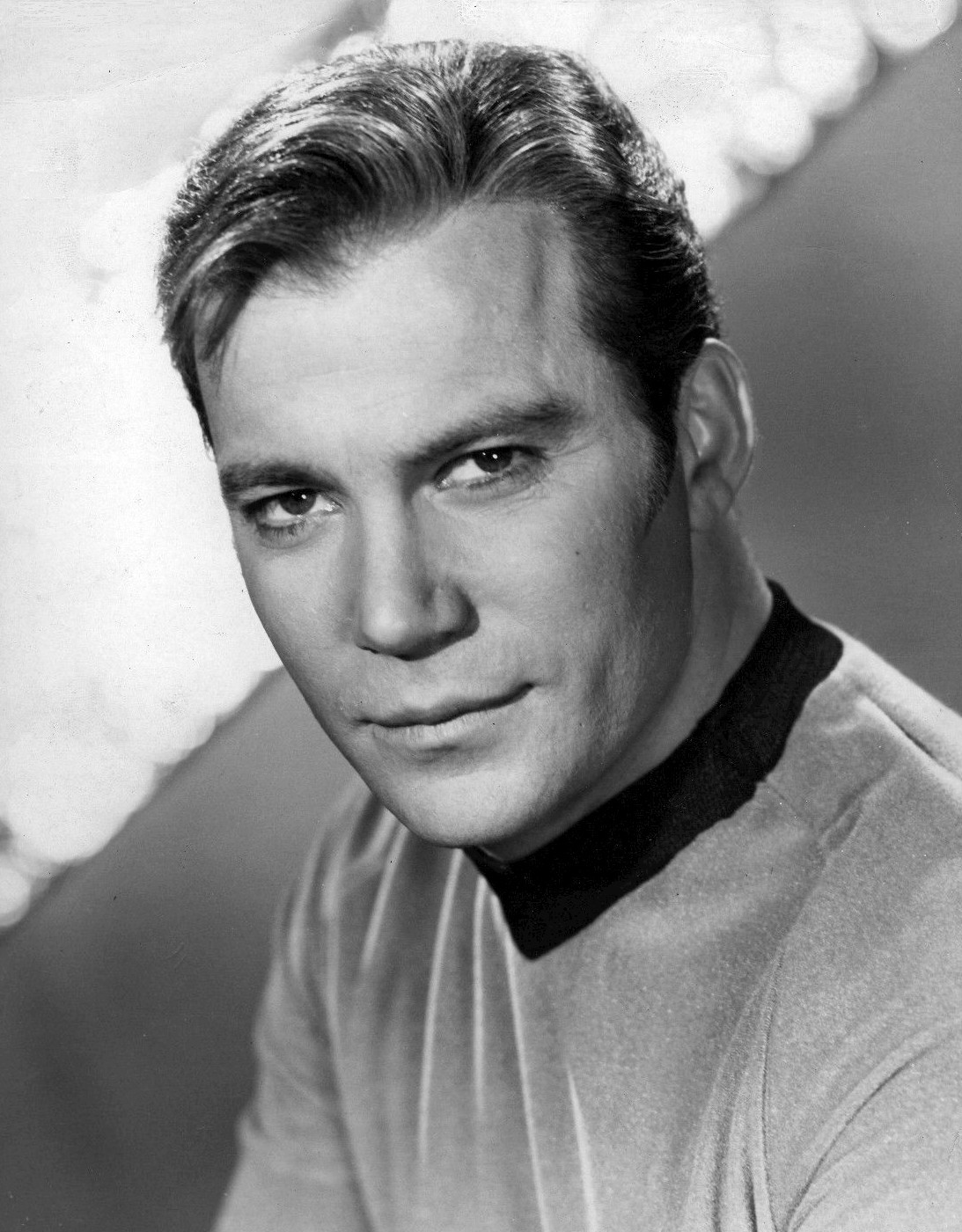
James T. Kirk

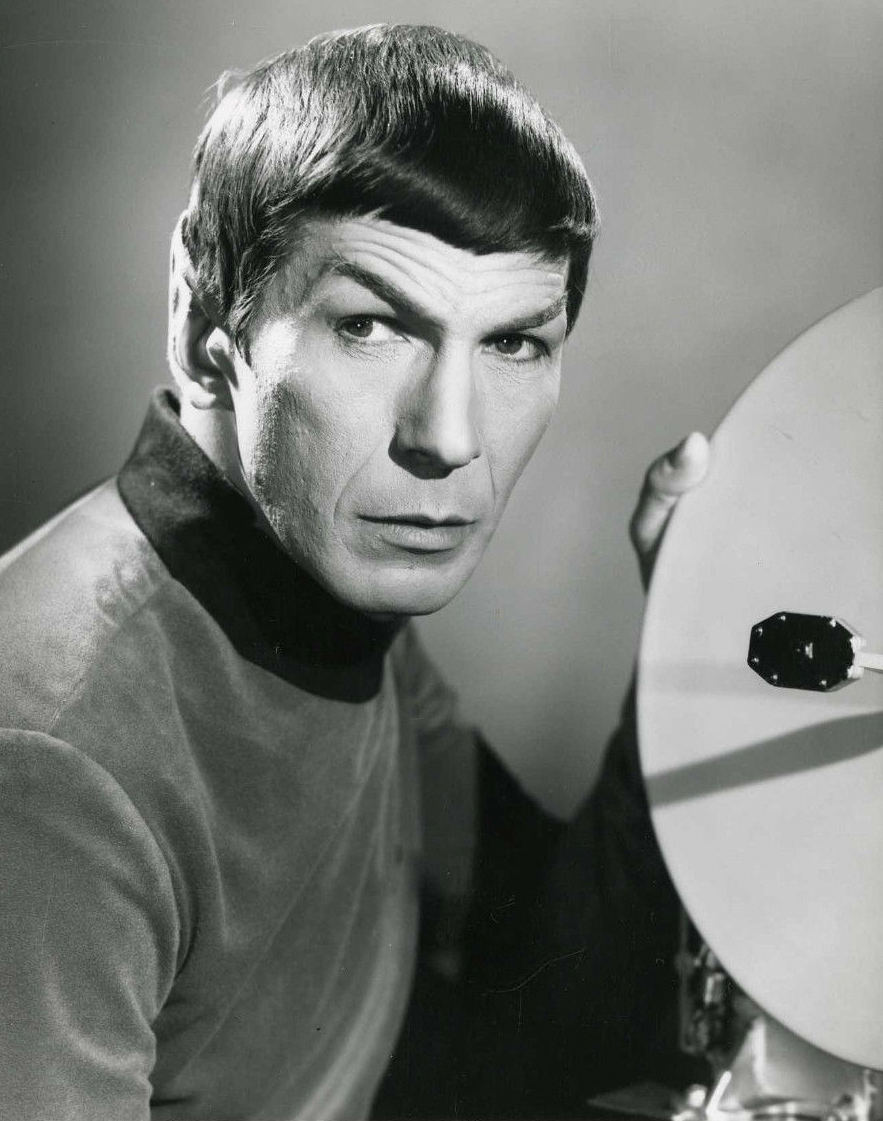
Spock

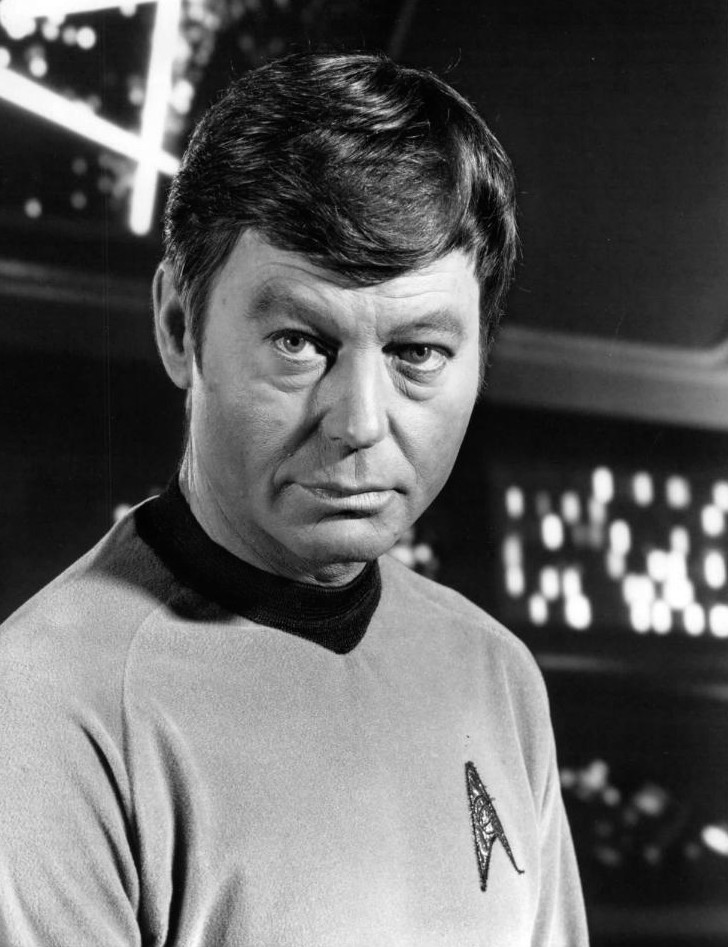
Dr. Leonard "Bones" McCoy

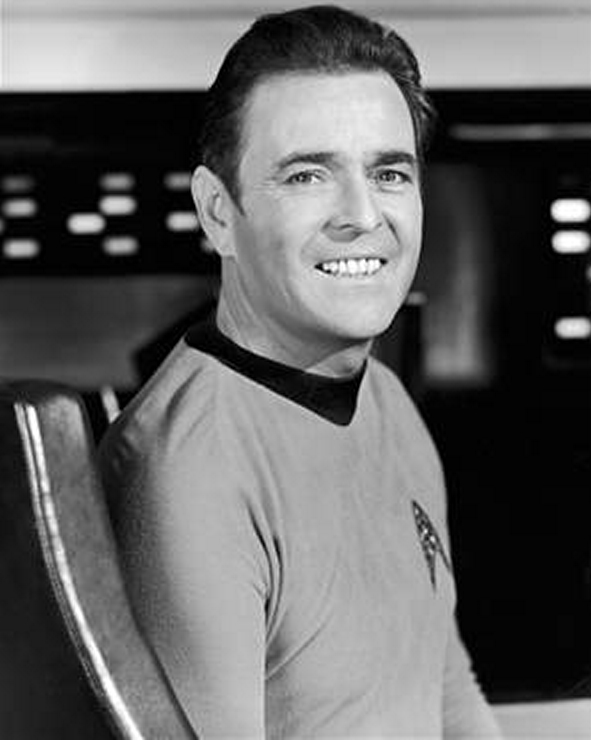
Montgomery "Scotty" Scott

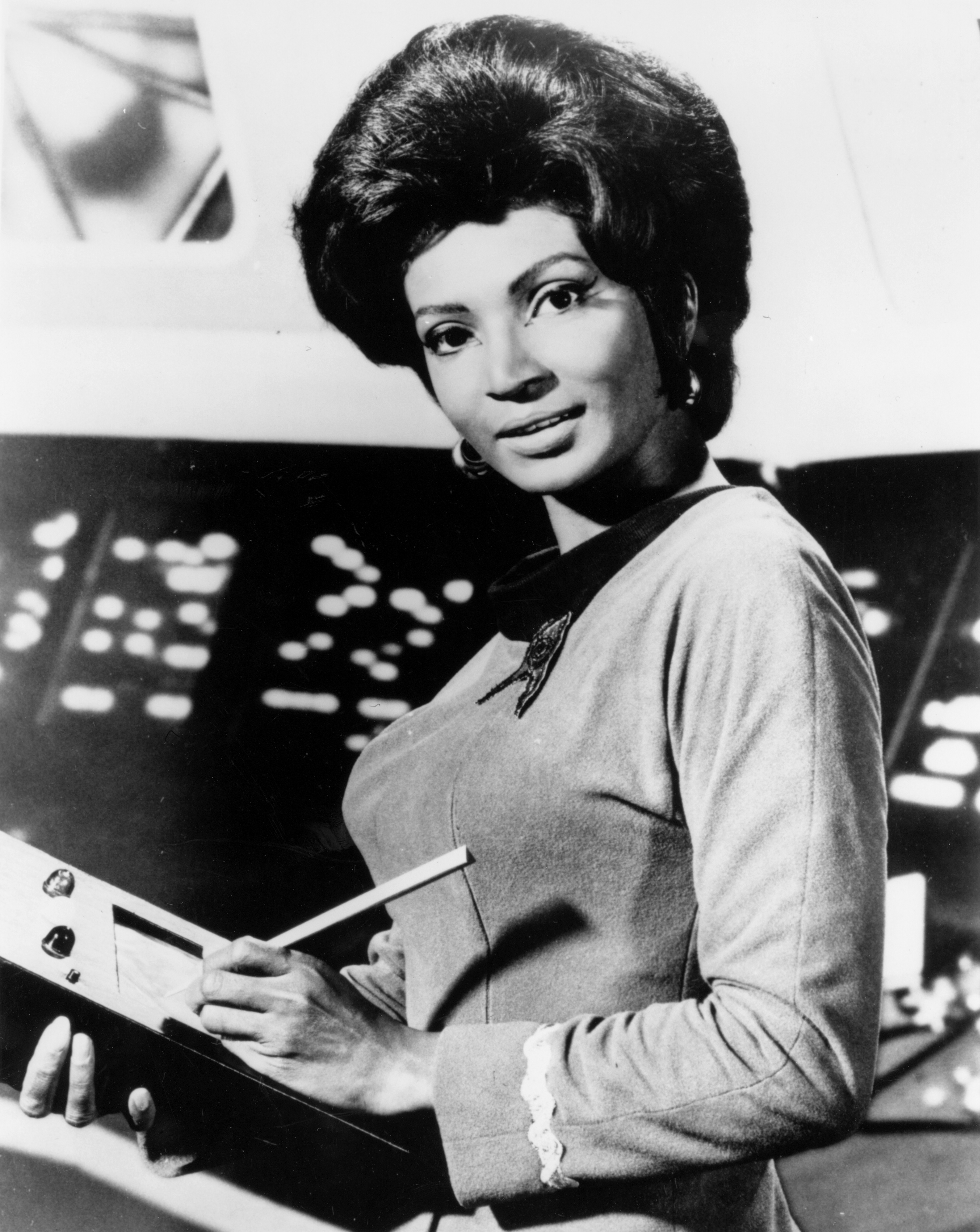
Nyota Uhura

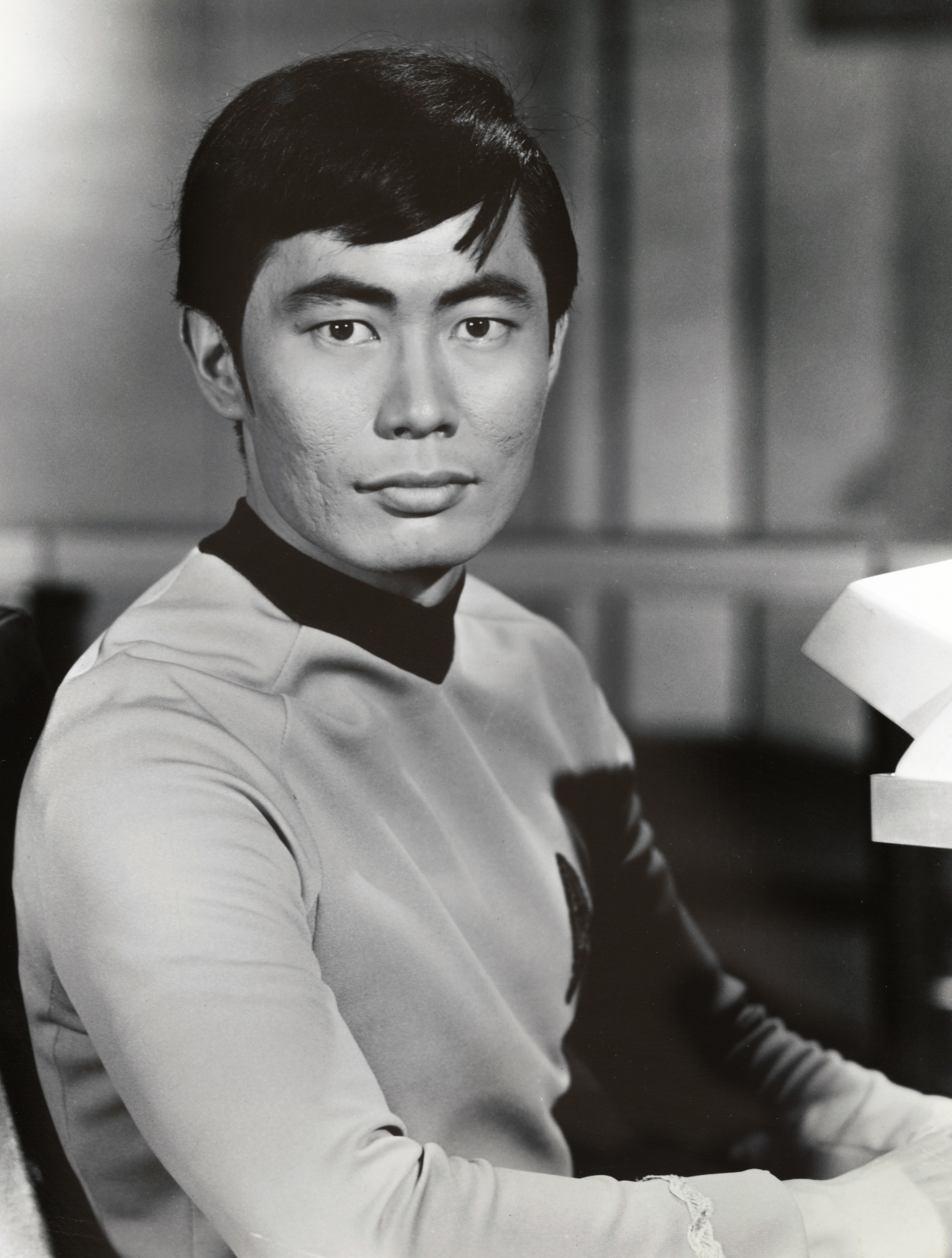
Hikaru Sulu

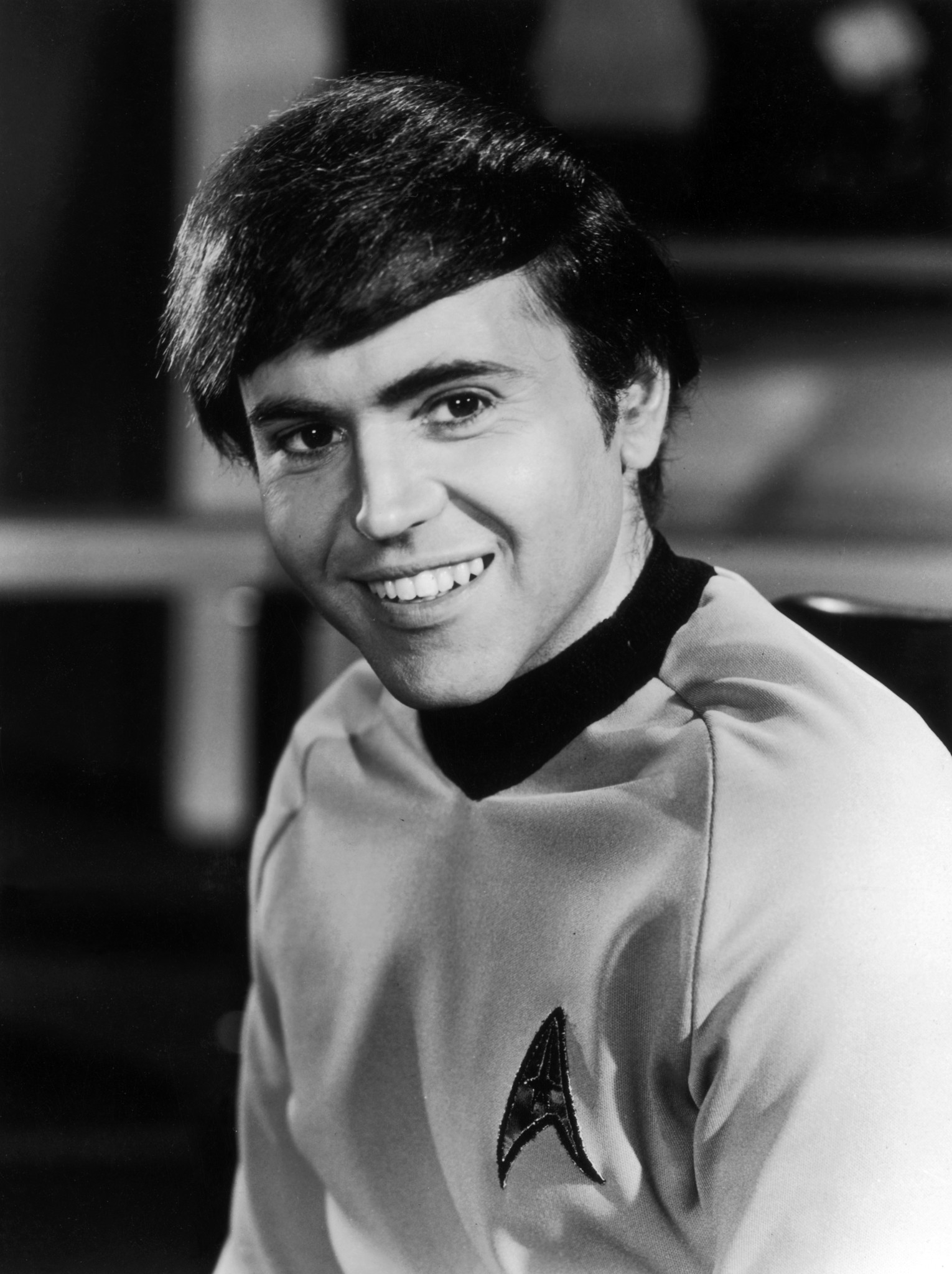
Pavel Chekov

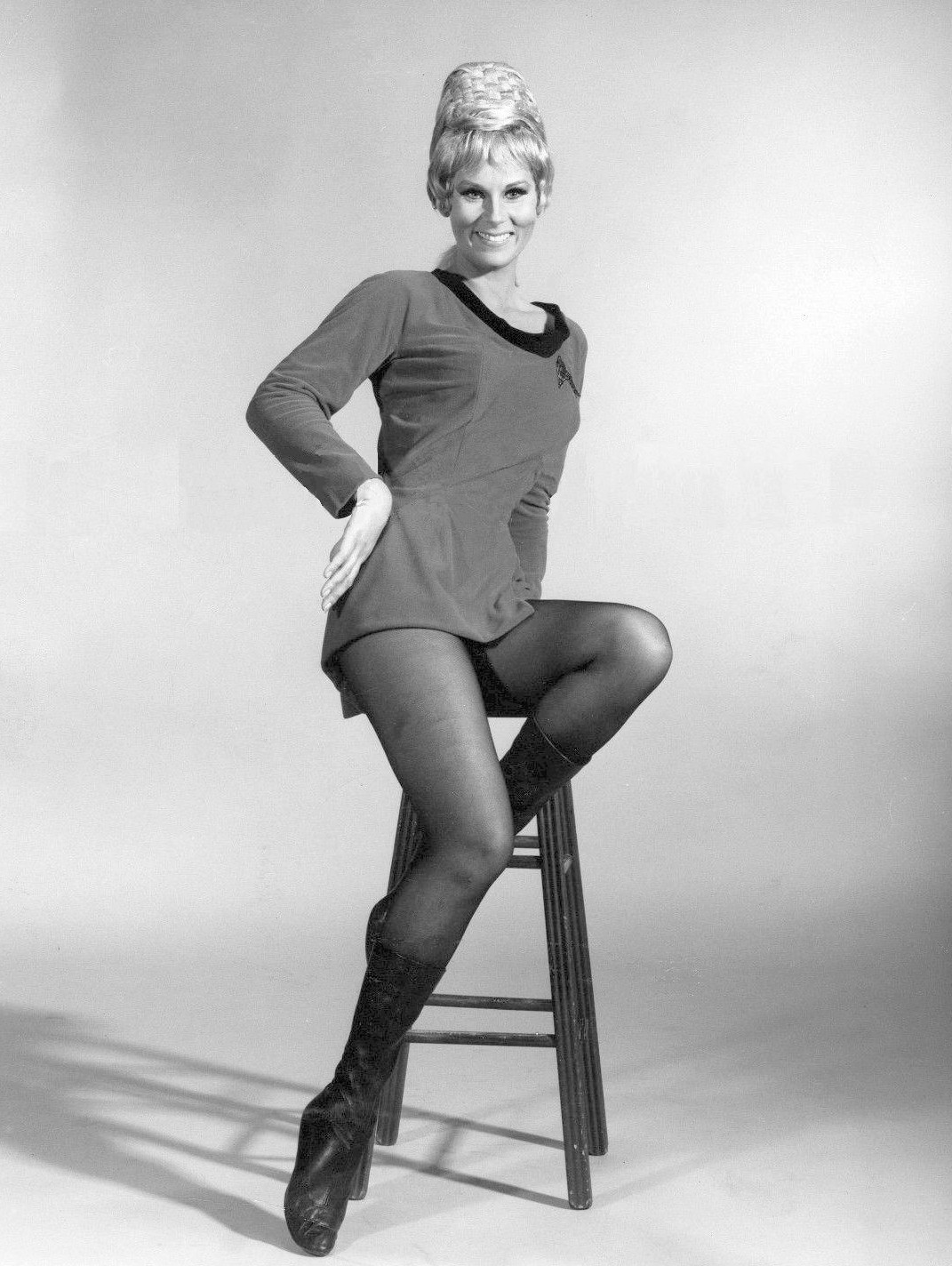
Janice Rand

Actor	Character	Position	Appearances	Character's species	Rank
William Shatner	James T. Kirk	Commanding officer	Seasons 1–3	Human	Captain
William Shatner	The commanding officer of USS Enterprise, born in Riverside, Iowa, in the year 2233. His two best friends are Spock and Dr. McCoy; one will advise Kirk with logic, while the other one uses emotional instincts.				
Leonard Nimoy	Spock	First/Executive officer Science officer	Seasons 1–3	Half-Human/Half-Vulcan	Lieutenant commander (Season 1) Commander (Seasons 1–3)
Leonard Nimoy	The half human, half Vulcan First/Executive Officer (i.e. second-in-command) and science officer. He is one of Kirk's best friends and uses logic to solve problems.				
DeForest Kelley	Dr. Leonard "Bones" McCoy	Chief medical officer	Seasons 1–3	Human	Lieutenant Commander
DeForest Kelley	The ship's chief medical officer, he is Kirk's other best friend and gives him advice with his human emotional feelings, whilst Spock uses logic.				
James Doohan	Montgomery "Scotty" Scott	Second officer and chief engineer	Seasons 1–3	Human	Lieutenant commander
James Doohan	The Enterprise's Scottish Chief Engineer and Second Officer (i.e. third-in-command), who is very protective of the ship. Scotty's technical knowledge and skill allow him to devise unconventional and effective last-minute solutions to dire problems.				
Nichelle Nichols	Nyota Uhura	Communications officer	Seasons 1–3	Human	Lieutenant
Nichelle Nichols	The ship's communication officer. She is depicted as a capable bridge officer and readily assumed control of the helm, navigation and science stations on the bridge when the need arose. Uhura was also a talented singer, and enjoyed serenading her shipmates when off-duty; Spock occasionally accompanied her on the Vulcan lyre. Note: Uhura's first name was not spoken at any time during the series or the movies starring the original cast, and it was not even clear that Uhura was not a mononym.				
George Takei	Hikaru Sulu	Helmsman	Seasons 1–3	Human	Lieutenant
George Takei	Sulu is the ship's helmsman and has many interests and hobbies, including gymnastics, botany, fencing, and ancient weaponry.				
Walter Koenig	Pavel Chekov	Navigator	Seasons 2 & 3	Human	Ensign
Walter Koenig	Chekov is a Russian navigator introduced in the show's second season.				
Majel Barrett	Christine Chapel	Head nurse	Seasons 1–3	Human	N/A
Majel Barrett	The ship's head nurse who works with Dr. McCoy. Note: Barrett, who played the ship's first officer (Number One) in "The Cage", also voiced the ship's computer.				
Grace Lee Whitney	Janice Rand	Yeoman	Season 1	Human	N/A
Grace Lee Whitney	The captain's personal yeoman.				

While still casting the roles, Gene Roddenberry had mandated that Bones McCoy and Spock be male. According to Nichelle Nichols, "They gave me a three page script to read from that had three characters named Bones, Kirk and somebody called Spock, and they asked me if I would read for the role of Spock. When I looked at this great text, I said to myself, 'I'll take any one of these roles,' but I found the Spock character to be very interesting, and I asked them to tell me what she [Spock] was like". They then told Nichols that the role had already been offered to Leonard Nimoy.

It was intended that Sulu's role be expanded in the second season, but owing to Takei's part in John Wayne's The Green Berets, he appeared in only half the season, his role being filled by Walter Koenig as the relatively young, mop-topped Russian navigator Ensign Pavel Chekov. When Takei returned, the two had to share a dressing room. The two appeared together at the Enterprise helm for the remainder of the series. There may be some truth to the unofficial story that the Soviet Union's newspaper Pravda complained that among the culturally diverse characters there were no Russians, seen as a personal slight to that country since the Soviet Russian Yuri Gagarin had been the first man to make a spaceflight. Gene Roddenberry said in response that "The Chekov thing was a major error on our part, and I'm still embarrassed by the fact we didn't include a Russian right from the beginning." However, documentation from Desilu suggests that the intention was to introduce a character into Star Trek with more sex appeal to teenaged girls. Walter Koenig noted in the 2006 40th anniversary special of Star Trek: The Original Series that he doubted the rumor about Pravda, since Star Trek had never been shown on Soviet television. It has also been claimed that the former member of The Monkees, Davy Jones, was the model for Mr. Chekov.

In addition, the series frequently included characters (usually security personnel wearing red uniforms) who are killed or injured soon after their introduction. So prevalent was this plot device that it inspired the term "redshirt" to denote a stock character whose sole purpose is to die violently in order to show the danger facing the main characters.

=== Characterizations ===
Star Trek made celebrities of its cast of largely unknown actors. Kelley had appeared in many films and television shows, but mostly in smaller roles that showcased him as a villain. Nimoy also had previous television and film experience but was not well known either. Nimoy had partnered previously with Shatner in a 1964 episode of The Man from U.N.C.L.E., "The Project Strigas Affair", and with Kelley (as a doctor) in a 1963 episode of The Virginian, "Man of Violence", both more than two years before Star Trek first aired. Before Star Trek, Shatner was well known in the trade, having appeared in several notable films, played Cyrano de Bergerac on Broadway, and even turned down the part of Dr. Kildare. However, when roles became sparse he took the regular job after Jeffrey Hunter's contract was not renewed.

Promotional photo of the cast of Star Trek during the third season (1968–1969). From left to right: James Doohan, Walter Koenig, DeForest Kelley, Majel Barrett, William Shatner, Nichelle Nichols, Leonard Nimoy, and George Takei.

After the original series ended, cast members found themselves typecast because of their defining roles in the show. (Star Trek: The Next Generation actor Michael Dorn stated in 1991, however: "If what happened to the first cast is called being typecast, then I want to be typecast. Of course, they didn't get the jobs after Trek. But they are making their sixth movie. Name me someone else in television who has made six movies!")

The three main characters were Kirk, Spock, and McCoy, with writers often playing the different personalities off each other: Kirk was passionate and often aggressive, but with a sly sense of humor; Spock was coolly logical; and McCoy was sardonic, emotional, and illogical, but always compassionate. In many stories the three clashed, with Kirk forced to make a tough decision while Spock advocated the logical but sometimes callous path and McCoy (or "Bones", as Kirk nicknamed him) insisted on doing whatever would cause the least harm. McCoy and Spock had a sparring relationship that masked their true affection and respect for each other, and their constant arguments became popular with viewers. The show so emphasized dialogue that writer and director Nicholas Meyer (involved with the Star Trek films) called it a radio drama, playing an episode for a film class without video to prove that the plot was still comprehensible.

The Spock character was at first rejected by network executives, who were apprehensive that his vaguely "Satanic" appearance (with pointed ears and eyebrows) might prove upsetting to some viewers, and (according to Leonard Nimoy) they repeatedly urged Roddenberry to "drop the Martian". Roddenberry was also dismayed to discover that NBC's publicity department deliberately airbrushed out Spock's pointed ears and eyebrows from early publicity stills sent to network affiliates, because they feared that his "demonic" appearance might offend potential buyers in the religiously conservative southern states. Spock, however, went on to become one of the most popular characters on the show, as did McCoy's impassioned country-doctor personality. Spock, in fact, became a sex symbol of sorts—something no one connected with the show had expected. Leonard Nimoy noted that the question of Spock's extraordinary sex appeal emerged "almost any time I talked to someone in the press ... I never give it a thought ... to try to deal with the question of Mr. Spock as a sex symbol is silly."

=== Characters' cameo appearances in later series ===
The sequel to the original series, Star Trek: The Next Generation, which premiered in 1987, was set about 100 years after the events of TOS. As that show and its spin-offs progressed, several TOS actors made appearances reprising their original characters:

- James Kirk disappears in 2293 during the maiden voyage of the Enterprise-B as seen in the film Star Trek: Generations. However, now chronologically 138 years old, but still only physically 60 years old, Kirk is recovered after spending 78 years in The Nexus, an alternative plane of existence, by Enterprise-D Captain Jean-Luc Picard in the same film. Kirk's time in the 24th century is short, however; he is killed while helping to defeat Dr. Tolian Soran.
- Spock, now a Vulcan ambassador, goes underground in the Romulan Empire in hopes of fostering peaceful coexistence with the Federation and reunification with Vulcan society ("Unification, Parts I and II"). He also appears in the 2009 reboot film where his science vessel originated from the 24th century–era of TNG. He ends up stranded in the 23rd century of the film series, where he settles on new Vulcan; in the sequel film Star Trek Into Darkness, he is contacted by his younger self regarding the villainous Khan Noonien Singh. While not appearing in Star Trek Beyond, it is mentioned in the film that the character has died, as an homage to the real-life passing of actor Leonard Nimoy.
- Leonard "Bones" McCoy, now a crusty 137-year-old admiral and head of Starfleet's Medical Division, inspects the Enterprise-D before her first mission in "Encounter at Farpoint", briefly meeting the android officer Lt. Cdr. Data, telling him, "Well, this is a new ship. But she's got the right name. Now, you remember that, you hear? ... You treat her like a lady, and she'll always bring you home."
- Montgomery Scott, now chronologically 147 years old, but still only physically 72 years old after spending 75 years trapped in a transporter buffer, is rescued by the Enterprise-D crew and resumes his life in "Relics". Working along with Chief Engineer Geordi La Forge, Scotty uses some creative engineering to save the Enterprise. A grateful Captain Picard lends him a shuttlecraft indefinitely.
- Sarek, Spock's father, continues to be an ambassador for the next century until his final mission during which he and Captain Picard mind-meld together because Sarek shows signs of Bendii Syndrome ("Sarek"). He later dies suffering from this affliction, but not before giving Captain Picard key information for locating his missing son ("Unification").
- Kang, Koloth, and Kor, the three Klingons featured in "Day of the Dove" (Kang), "The Trouble with Tribbles" (Koloth) and "Errand of Mercy" (Kor), continue to serve the Empire well into the 24th century. They appear in the Star Trek: Deep Space Nine episode "Blood Oath" in which Kang and Koloth are killed. Kor later appears in two more episodes: "The Sword of Kahless" and finally in "Once More Unto the Breach" where, fighting in the Dominion War, he dies honorably in battle. A younger version of Kang, from the era of Star Trek VI: The Undiscovered Country, later appears in the Star Trek: Voyager episode "Flashback".
- Hikaru Sulu, promoted to captain of USS Excelsior in Star Trek VI: The Undiscovered Country, reprises his role from that performance in the Star Trek: Voyager episode "Flashback". Janice Rand also appears in that same episode.
- Arne Darvin, the Klingon disguised as a human in "The Trouble with Tribbles", appears in the Star Trek: Deep Space Nine episode "Trials and Tribble-ations" with the intent to return to Deep Space Station K7 in 2267 and assassinate Kirk, whom Darvin blamed for his disgrace in the Klingon Empire.

Besides the above examples, numerous non-canon novels and comic books have been published over the years in which The Original Series era crew are depicted in The Next Generation era, either through time-travel or other means. In addition, many actors who appeared on The Original Series later made guest appearances as different characters in later series, most notably Majel Barrett, who not only provided the voice for most Starfleet computers in episodes of every spin-off series (including a single appearance on Star Trek: Enterprise, where the computers normally did not speak at all), but also had the recurring role of Lwaxana Troi in The Next Generation and Deep Space Nine. Diana Muldaur, a guest star in the episodes "Return to Tomorrow" and "Is There in Truth No Beauty?" of the original Star Trek series, played series regular Dr. Katherine Pulaski in the second season of Star Trek: The Next Generation.

=== Notable guest appearances ===
Guest roles on the series have featured actors such as:

- Yvonne Craig as Marta in "Whom Gods Destroy"
- Gary Lockwood and Sally Kellerman in "Where No Man Has Gone Before"
- Diana Muldaur in "Return to Tomorrow" and "Is There in Truth No Beauty?" (Muldaur also appeared throughout the second season of Star Trek: The Next Generation as the Enterprise-D's chief medical officer, Dr. Katherine Pulaski)
- Ricardo Montalbán as Khan Noonien Singh in "Space Seed". He then reprised the role in the film Star Trek II: The Wrath of Khan
- Madlyn Rhue as Lieutenant Marla McGivers in "Space Seed".
- Michael Ansara as Klingon commander Kang in "Day of the Dove", reprising the role in the Deep Space Nine episode "Blood Oath" and the Voyager episode "Flashback"
- William Marshall in "The Ultimate Computer"
- Julie Newmar in "Friday's Child"
- Kim Darby and Michael J. Pollard in "Miri"
- Robert Lansing and Teri Garr in "Assignment: Earth"
- William Windom in "The Doomsday Machine"
- John Colicos as the Klingon Commander Kor in "Errand of Mercy", reprising the role in three episodes of Deep Space Nine
- Robert Walker Jr. in "Charlie X"
- Lee Meriwether in "That Which Survives"
- Roger C. Carmel and Karen Steele in "Mudd's Women". Carmel returned in "I, Mudd"
- France Nuyen in "Elaan of Troyius", possibly the first Vietnamese actress to appear on American television
- Mark Lenard, the only actor to play members of three major non-human races in The Original Series, as the Romulan commander in "Balance of Terror", the Klingon Commander in Star Trek: The Motion Picture, and most notably as Spock's father Sarek in "Journey to Babel", reprising this role in the films Star Trek III: The Search for Spock, Star Trek IV: The Voyage Home, and Star Trek VI: The Undiscovered Country, as well as in the TNG episodes "Sarek" and "Unification, Part 1"
- Jane Wyatt as Spock's mother Amanda Grayson in "Journey to Babel", reprising the role in the film Star Trek IV: The Voyage Home
- Glenn Corbett and Elinor Donahue in "Metamorphosis"
- Elisha Cook Jr. and Joan Marshall in "Court Martial"
- Nancy Kovack in "A Private Little War"
- Vic Tayback and Anthony Caruso in "A Piece of the Action"
- Jeff Corey and Fred Williamson in "The Cloud Minders"
- Barbara Bouchet and Warren Stevens in "By Any Other Name"
- Michael Forest and Leslie Parrish in "Who Mourns for Adonais?"
- Charles Napier in "The Way to Eden"
- Frank Gorshin and Lou Antonio in "Let That Be Your Last Battlefield"
- Ted Cassidy and Sherry Jackson in "What Are Little Girls Made Of?"; Cassidy also voiced the Balok mannequin in "The Corbomite Maneuver", and the Gorn in "Arena"
- Mariette Hartley in "All Our Yesterdays"
- Joan Collins in "The City on the Edge of Forever"
- Celia Lovsky and Arlene Martel in "Amok Time"
- David Soul in "The Apple"
- James Gregory in "Dagger of the Mind"
- Barbara Anderson in "The Conscience of the King"
- James Daly in "Requiem for Methuselah"
- Jill Ireland in "This Side of Paradise"
- Melvin Belli and Pamelyn Ferdin in "And the Children Shall Lead"
- Keye Luke, Yvonne Craig and Steve Ihnat in "Whom Gods Destroy"
- Michael Dunn and Barbara Babcock in "Plato's Stepchildren"
- Clint Howard in "The Corbomite Maneuver"
- Barbara Luna in "Mirror, Mirror"
- David Opatoshu in "A Taste of Armageddon"
- Barbara Babcock in "A Taste of Armageddon" and "Plato's Stepchildren". Her voice was also heard in "The Squire of Gothos", "Assignment: Earth", "The Tholian Web" and "The Lights of Zetar".
- Morgan Woodward in "Dagger of the Mind" and "The Omega Glory"
- Arnold Moss as mysterious actor Anton Karidian, who proves to have originally been the tyrannical Governor Kodos of Tarsus IV in "The Conscience of the King"
- Marianna Hill in "Dagger of the Mind"
- Joanne Linville in "The Enterprise Incident"
- Louise Sorel in "Requiem for Methuselah"
- John Fiedler in "Wolf in the Fold"
- Vic Perrin in "Mirror, Mirror". His voice was also heard in "The Menagerie", "Arena" and "The Changeling".
- Susan Oliver, Jeffrey Hunter and Malachi Throne in "The Menagerie". Malachi Throne also voiced the main Talosian Keeper, with the voice modified so as not to be heard to be the same as the other character he played, Commodore Mendez.
- Antoinette Bower in "Catspaw"
- Angelique Pettyjohn and Joseph Ruskin in "Gamesters of Triskelion"

== Seasons and episodes ==
=== Seasons ===
Season	Episodes	Originally released	
Season	Episodes	First released	Last released
1	29	September 8, 1966	April 13, 1967
2	26	September 15, 1967	March 29, 1968
3	24	September 20, 1968	June 3, 1969

=== Broadcast history ===
Season	Time slot (ET)
1966–67	Thursday at 8:30 pm
1967–68	Friday at 8:30 pm
1968–69	Friday at 10:00 pm (episodes 1–23); Tuesday at 7:30 pm (episode 24)

=== Episode analysis ===
In its writing, Star Trek is notable as one of the earliest science-fiction TV series to use the services of leading contemporary science fiction writers, such as Robert Bloch, Norman Spinrad, Harlan Ellison, and Theodore Sturgeon, as well as established television writers.

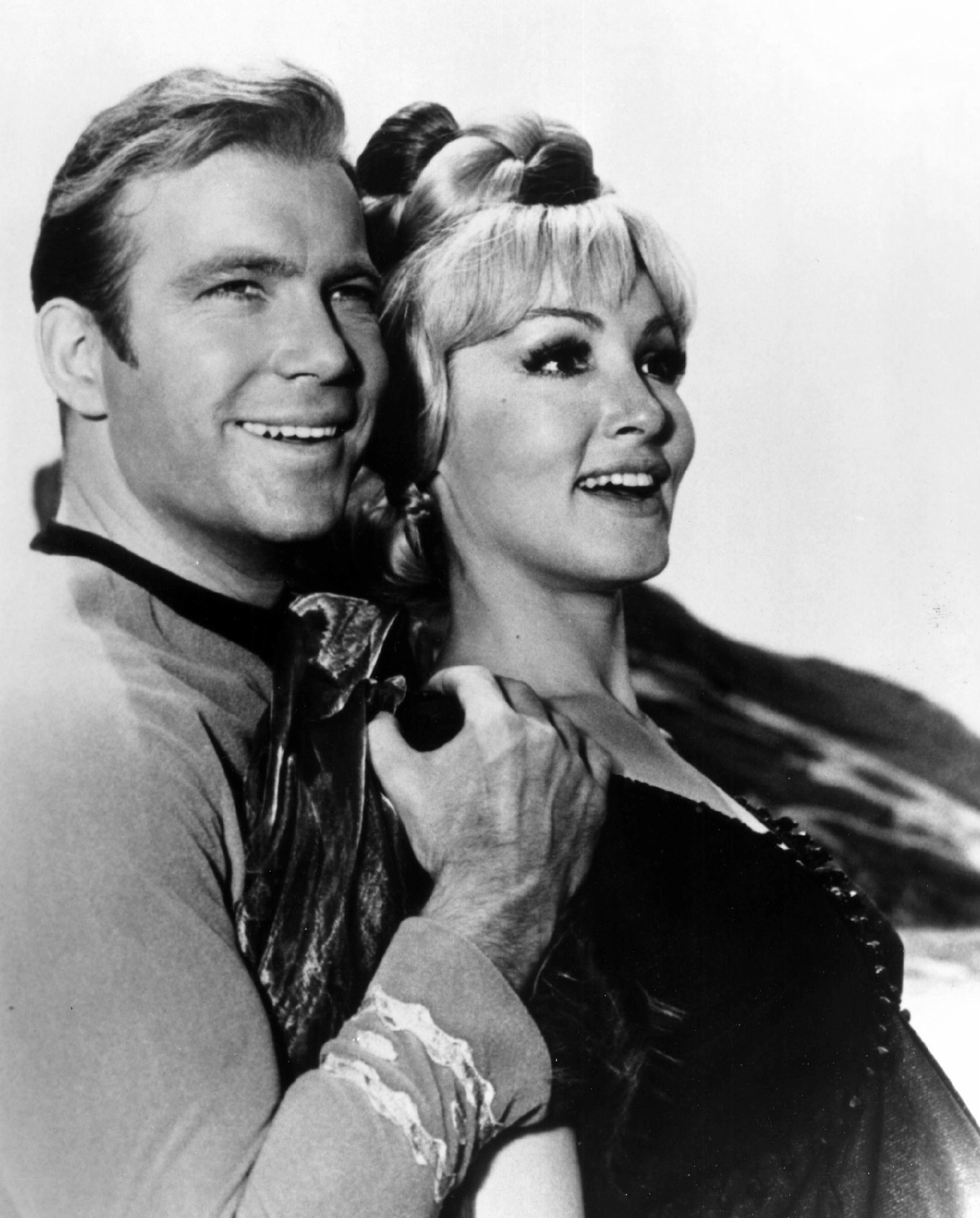
Shatner and Julie Newmar (1967)

Roddenberry often used the setting of a space vessel set many years in the future to comment on social issues of 1960s America, including sexism, racism, nationalism, and global war. In November 1968, just a few months after the first televised interracial touch, the episode "Plato's Stepchildren" went incorrectly down in history as the first American television show to feature a scripted interracial kiss between characters (Capt. Kirk and Lt. Uhura), although the kiss was only mimed (obscured by the back of a character's head) and depicted as involuntary. There is however some dispute to this being the first interracial kiss of the series because the 1967 episode "Space Seed" – introducing the villain Khan (Ricardo Montalbán) – has him seducing and kissing Lt. Marla McGivers (Madlyn Rhue) as part of his malicious machinations. "Let That Be Your Last Battlefield" presented a direct allegory about the irrationality and futility of racism. Anti-war themes appear in episodes such as "The Doomsday Machine", depicting a planet-destroying weapon as an analogy to nuclear weapons deployed under the principle of mutually assured destruction, and "A Taste of Armageddon" about a society which has "civilized" war to the point that they no longer see it as something to avoid.

Episodes such as "The Apple", "Who Mourns for Adonais?", "The Mark of Gideon" and "The Return of the Archons" display subtle anti-religious (owing mainly to Roddenberry's own secular humanism) and anti-establishment themes. "Bread and Circuses" and "The Omega Glory" have themes that are more pro-Christian or patriotic.

The show experienced network and sponsor interference up to and including wholesale censorship of scripts and film footage. This was a regular occurrence in the 1960s, and Star Trek suffered from its fair share of tampering. Scripts were routinely vetted and censored by the staff of NBC's Broadcast Standards Department, which copiously annotated every script with demands for cuts or changes (e.g., "Page 4: Please delete McCoy's expletive, 'Good Lord'" or "Page 43: Caution on the embrace; avoid open-mouthed kiss").

The series was noted for its sense of humor, such as Spock and McCoy's pointed yet friendly bickering. Certain episodes, such as "The Trouble with Tribbles", "I, Mudd" and "A Piece of the Action", were written and staged as comedies with dramatic elements. Most episodes were presented as action-adventure dramas frequently including space battles or fist fights between the ship's crew and guest antagonists.

Several episodes used the concept of planets developing parallel to Earth allowing reuse of stock props, costumes and sets. "Bread and Circuses", "Miri" and "The Omega Glory" depict such worlds; "A Piece of the Action", "Patterns of Force" and "Plato's Stepchildren" are based on alien planets that have adopted period Earth cultures (Prohibition-era Chicago, Nazi Germany and ancient Greece respectively). Two episodes depicting time travel ("Tomorrow Is Yesterday" and "Assignment: Earth") conveniently place Enterprise in orbit above 1960s Earth. A third ("The City on the Edge of Forever") places members of the crew on 1930s Earth.

=== Top ranked episodes ===
Several publications have ranked the ten best episodes of Star Trek:

Rank	Entertainment Weekly (1995)	IGN (2012)	Newsweek (2016)	Hollywood.com (2013)	Den of Geek (2021)
1	"The City on the Edge of Forever"	"The City on the Edge of Forever"	"The Doomsday Machine"	"The City on the Edge of Forever"	"A Taste of Armageddon"
2	"Space Seed"	"Balance of Terror"	"Space Seed"	"Arena"	"The City on the Edge of Forever"
3	"Mirror, Mirror"	"Mirror, Mirror"	"Mirror, Mirror"	"Mirror, Mirror"	"The Corbomite Maneuver"
4	"The Doomsday Machine"	"Space Seed"	"The Trouble with Tribbles"	"Balance of Terror"	"The Devil in the Dark"
5	"Amok Time"	"The Trouble with Tribbles"	"The Enterprise Incident"	"Space Seed"	"A Piece of the Action"
6	"The Devil in the Dark"	"Where No Man Has Gone Before"	"Journey to Babel"	"The Galileo Seven"	"Space Seed"
7	"The Trouble with Tribbles"	"The Enemy Within"	"Balance of Terror"	"Amok Time"	"Balance of Terror"
8	"This Side of Paradise"	"The Naked Time"	"Arena"	"Journey to Babel"	"Arena"
9	"The Enterprise Incident"	"This Side of Paradise"	"Amok Time"	"The Doomsday Machine"	"Let That Be Your Last Battlefield"
10	"Journey to Babel"	"Arena"	"The City on the Edge of Forever"	"The Enterprise Incident"	"The Man Trap"

Of the twenty-one different episodes listed above, thirteen – "Where No Man Has Gone Before", "The Enemy Within", "The Naked Time", "Balance of Terror", "The Galileo Seven", "Arena", "Space Seed", "This Side of Paradise", "The Devil in the Dark", "A Taste of Armageddon", "The Corbomite Maneuver", "The Man Trap", and "The City on the Edge of Forever" – are from the first season and six – "Amok Time", "The Doomsday Machine", "Mirror, Mirror", "The Trouble with Tribbles", "A Piece of the Action", and "Journey to Babel" – are from the second season. Only two – "The Enterprise Incident" and "Let That Be Your Last Battlefield" – derive from the third season.

Only two episodes, "The City on the Edge of Forever" and "Space Seed", appear on all five lists.

=== Leonard Nimoy: Star Trek Memories ===
In 1983, Leonard Nimoy hosted a one-hour special as a promotional tie-in with the film Star Trek III: The Search for Spock, in which he recounted his memories of working on the original series and explained the origins of things such as the Vulcan nerve pinch and the Vulcan salute, as well as a re-airing of the TOS episode "Space Seed".

== Music ==
=== Theme tune ===
The show's theme tune was written by Alexander Courage and has been featured in several Star Trek spin-off episodes and motion pictures. Gene Roddenberry subsequently wrote a set of accompanying lyrics, even though the lyrics were never used in the series, nor did Roddenberry ever intend them to be; this allowed him to claim co-composer credit and hence 50% of the theme's performance royalties. Courage considered Roddenberry's actions, while entirely legal, to be unethical. Series producer Robert Justman noted in the book Inside Star Trek: The Real Story, that work on the film Doctor Dolittle kept Courage from working on more than two episodes of the first season. However, Justman also believed that Courage lost enthusiasm for the series because of the "royalty" issue. Courage did not score any episodes of the second season; however, he did conduct a recording session for about 30 minutes of "library cues" for the second season, on June 16, 1967. Courage returned to score two episodes of the third season.

Later episodes used stock recordings from Courage's earlier work. Jazz trumpeter Maynard Ferguson recorded a jazz fusion version of the tune with his band during the late 1970s, and Nichelle Nichols performed the song live complete with lyrics.

The lyrics for the song are:

Beyond the rim of the starlight
My love is wandering in star flight
I know he'll find
In star clustered reaches
Love, strange love
A starwoman teaches

I know his journey ends never
His Star Trek will go on forever
But tell him while
He wanders his starry sea
Remember
Remember me

=== Dramatic underscore ===
For budgetary reasons, this series made significant use of "tracked" music, or music written for other episodes that was reused in later episodes. Of the 79 episodes that were broadcast, only 31 had complete or partial original dramatic underscores created specifically for them. The remainder of the music in any episode was tracked from other episodes and from cues recorded for the music library. Which episodes would have new music was mostly the decision of Robert H. Justman, the Associate Producer during the first two seasons.

Screen credits for the composers were given based on the amount of music composed for, or composed and reused in, the episode. Some of these final music credits were occasionally incorrect.

Beyond the short works of "source" music (music whose source is seen or acknowledged onscreen) created for specific episodes, eight composers were contracted to create original dramatic underscore during the series run: Alexander Courage, George Duning, Jerry Fielding, Gerald Fried, Sol Kaplan, Samuel Matlovsky, Joseph Mullendore, and Fred Steiner. The composers conducted their own music. Of these composers, Steiner composed the original music for thirteen episodes and it is his instrumental arrangement of Alexander Courage's main theme that is heard over many of the end title credits of the series.

The tracked musical underscores were chosen and edited to the episode by the music editors, principal of whom were Robert Raff (most of Season One), Jim Henrikson (Season One and Two), and Richard Lapham (Season Three).

Some of the original recordings of the music were released in the United States commercially on the GNP Crescendo Record Co. label. Music for a number of the episodes was re-recorded by Fred Steiner and the Royal Philharmonic Orchestra for the Varèse Sarabande label; and by Tony Bremner with the Royal Philharmonic for the Label X label. Finally in December 2012, the complete original recordings were released by La-La Land Records as a 15-CD box set, with liner notes by Jeff Bond.

=== Episodes with original music ===
Listed in production order. Episodes that were only partially scored are in italics.

Season 1:

1. "The Cage"/"The Menagerie" (Alexander Courage)
2. "Where No Man Has Gone Before" (Alexander Courage)
3. "The Corbomite Maneuver" (Fred Steiner)
4. "Mudd's Women" (Fred Steiner)
5. "The Enemy Within" (Sol Kaplan)
6. "The Man Trap" (Alexander Courage)
7. "The Naked Time" (Alexander Courage)
8. "Charlie X" (Fred Steiner)
9. "Balance of Terror" (Fred Steiner)
10. "What Are Little Girls Made Of?" (Fred Steiner)
11. "The Conscience of the King" (Joseph Mullendore)
12. "Shore Leave" (Gerald Fried)
13. "The City on the Edge of Forever" (Fred Steiner)

Season 2:

1. "Catspaw" (Gerald Fried)
2. "Metamorphosis" (George Duning)
3. "Friday's Child" (Gerald Fried)
4. "Who Mourns for Adonais?" (Fred Steiner)
5. "Amok Time" (Gerald Fried)
6. "The Doomsday Machine" (Sol Kaplan)
7. "Mirror, Mirror" (Fred Steiner)
8. "I, Mudd" (Samuel Matlovsky)
9. "The Trouble with Tribbles" (Jerry Fielding)
10. "By Any Other Name" (Fred Steiner)
11. "Patterns of Force" (George Duning)
12. "The Omega Glory" (Fred Steiner)
13. "Return to Tomorrow" (George Duning)

Season 3:

1. "Spectre of the Gun" (Jerry Fielding)
2. "Elaan of Troyius" (Fred Steiner)
3. "The Paradise Syndrome" (Gerald Fried)
4. "The Enterprise Incident" (Alexander Courage)
5. "And the Children Shall Lead" (George Duning)
6. "Spock's Brain" (Fred Steiner)
7. "Is There in Truth No Beauty?" (George Duning)
8. "The Empath" (George Duning)
9. "Plato's Stepchildren" (Alexander Courage)

Note: Although "The Way to Eden" had no original score, the episode had special musical material by Arthur Heinemann (the episode's writer), guest star Charles Napier and Craig Robertson. "Requiem for Methuselah" contains a Johannes Brahms interpretation by Ivan Ditmars.

== Awards ==
Although this series never won any Emmys, Star Trek was nominated for the following Emmy Awards:

- Outstanding Dramatic Series (Gene Roddenberry and Gene L. Coon), 1967
- Outstanding Dramatic Series (Gene Roddenberry), 1968
- Outstanding Supporting Actor (Leonard Nimoy as Mr. Spock), 1967, 1968, 1969
- Individual Achievement in Art Direction and Allied Crafts (Jim Rugg), 1967
- Individual Achievement in Cinematography (Darrell Anderson, Linwood G. Dunn, and Joseph Westheimer), 1967
- Individual Achievement in Film and Sound Editing (Doug Grindstaff), 1967
- Outstanding Achievement in Film Editing (Donald R. Rode), 1968
- Special Classification of Individual Achievement for Photographic Effects (The Westheimer Company), 1968
- Outstanding Achievement in Art Direction and Scenic Design (John Dwyer and Walter M. Jefferies), 1969
- Outstanding Achievement in Film Editing (Donald R. Rode), 1969
- Special Classification Achievements for Photographic Effects (The Howard A. Anderson Company, The Westheimer Company, Van der Veer Photo Effects, Cinema Research), 1969.

Eight of its episodes were nominated for one of science-fiction's top awards, the Hugo Award, in the category "Best Dramatic Presentation". In 1967, the nominated episodes were "The Naked Time", "The Corbomite Maneuver", and "The Menagerie". In 1968, all nominees were Star Trek episodes: "Amok Time", "Mirror, Mirror", "The Doomsday Machine", "The Trouble with Tribbles", and "The City on the Edge of Forever". Star Trek won both years for the episodes "The Menagerie" and "The City on the Edge of Forever", respectively. In 1968, Star Trek won a special Hugo Award for Dramatic Presentation. No episode was named. This was the show's 3rd Hugo Award, and 9th Hugo nomination.

In 1967, Star Trek was also one of the first television programs to receive an NAACP Image Award.

In 1968, Star Trek's most critically acclaimed episode, "The City on the Edge of Forever", written by Harlan Ellison, won the prestigious Writers Guild of America Award for Best Original Teleplay, although this was for Ellison's original draft script, and not for the screenplay of the episode as it aired.

In 1997, "The City on the Edge of Forever" was ranked #92 on TV Guide's 100 Greatest Episodes of All Time.

In 2004 and 2007, TV Guide ranked Star Trek as the greatest cult show ever.

In 2013, TV Guide ranked Star Trek as the greatest sci-fi show (along with Star Trek: The Next Generation) and the #12 greatest show of all time, while the Writers Guild of America ranked it #33 on their list of the 101 Best Written TV Series.

== Distribution ==
=== Home media ===
Episodes of the Original Series were among the first television series to be released on the VHS and LaserDisc formats in North America. The first episode on VHS for sale to the public was Space Seed released in June 1982 (to celebrate the release of the second Star Trek film, The Wrath of Khan) at a price of $29.95, as prior to this titles were rental only. In 1985, the first 10 episodes went on sale on video at a price of $14.95 with further batches of 10 during 1985 and 1986, making it the first long-running TV series to be released on home video in its entirety, with all episodes eventually being released on both formats. By 1986, sales had reached 1 million units. With the advent of DVD in the mid-1990s, single DVDs featuring two episodes each in production order were released. In the early 2000s, Paramount Home Video reissued the series to DVD in a series of three deluxe season boxes with added featurettes and documentaries. In February 2009, CBS and Paramount announced that they would release the Original Series on Blu-ray. Season one, two, and three were released on April 28, September 22, and December 15, respectively. The Blu-ray releases let the user choose between "Enhanced Effects" or "Original Effects" via a technique called multi-angle.

All 79 episodes of the series have been digitally remastered by CBS Home Entertainment (distributed by Paramount) and have since been released on DVD. CBS Home Entertainment released season one of The Original Series on Blu-ray on April 28, 2009. The Blu-ray release contains both Original and Remastered episodes by seamless branching.

Blu-ray name	Ep #	Discs	Region 1/A (USA)	Region 2/B (UK)	Region 4/B (Australia)	Blu-ray special features
Season One	29	7	April 28, 2009	April 27, 2009	May 6, 2009	Starfleet Access for "Where No Man Has Gone Before" Spacelift: Transporting Trek Into the 21st Century Starfleet Access for "The Menagerie, Parts I and II" Reflections on Spock Starfleet Access for "The Balance of Terror" Life Beyond Trek: William Shatner To Boldly Go... Season One The Birth of a Timeless Legacy Starfleet Access for "Space Seed" Sci-Fi Visionaries Interactive Enterprise Inspection Billy Blackburn's Treasure Chest: Rare Home Movies and Special Memories Kiss 'n' Tell: Romance in the 23rd Century Starfleet Access for "Errand of Mercy"
Season Two	26	7	September 22, 2009	October 9, 2009	October 1, 2009	Billy Blackburn's Treasure Chest: Rare Home Movies and Special Memories Part 2 Starfleet Access for "Amok Time" "Content to Go" featurette via Mobile-Blu: Writing Spock "Content to Go" featurette via Mobile-Blu: Creating Chekov "Content to Go" featurette via Mobile-Blu: Listening to the Actors "More Tribbles, More Troubles" audio commentary by David Gerrold DS9: "Trials and Tribble-ations" "Trials and Tribble-ations": Uniting Two Legends Star Trek: The Original Series on Blu-ray "Trials and Tribble-ations": An Historic Endeavor Starfleet Access for "The Trouble with Tribbles" "Content to Go" featurette via Mobile-Blu: Spock's Mother To Boldly Go... Season Two Designing the Final Frontier Star Trek's Favorite Moments Writer's Notebook: D.C. Fontana Life Beyond Trek: Leonard Nimoy Kirk, Spock & Bones: Star Trek's Great Trio Star Trek's Divine Diva: Nichelle Nichols Enhanced Visual Effects Credits
Season Three	24	6	December 15, 2009	March 22, 2010	May 1, 2013	Life Beyond Trek: Walter Koenig Chief Engineer's Log Memoir from Mr. Sulu Captain's Log: Bob Justman "Where No Man Has Gone Before" (Unaired, alternate version) David Gerrold Hosts 2009 Convention Coverage "The Anthropology of Star Trek" Comic-Con Panel 2009 The World of Rod Roddenberry – Comic-Con 2009 Billy Blackburn's Treasure Chest: Rare Home Movies and Special Memories Part 3 To Boldly Go... Season Three Collectible Trek Star Trek's Impact

=== Online distribution ===
CBS Interactive is presenting all 3 seasons of the series via the tv.com iPhone app. The full-length episodes, without the new CGI but digitally processed to remove the original celluloid artifacts, are available to users in the United States at no charge but with embedded ads. Short clips from the shows are also viewable at their web site. The company has recently presented all 3 seasons of the series via its Paramount+ premium streaming service. It has all full-length episodes, without the new CGI, like the tv.com app, and is available to users in the United States with subscription without ad interruptions.

In January 2007, the first season of Star Trek: The Original Series became available for download from Apple's iTunes Store. Although consumer reviews indicate that some of the episodes on iTunes are the newly "remastered" editions, iTunes editors had not indicated such, and if so, which are which. All first-season episodes that had been remastered and aired were available from iTunes, except "Where No Man Has Gone Before", which remains in its original form. On March 20, 2007, the first season was again added to the iTunes Store, with separate downloads for the original and remastered versions of the show, though according to the customer reviews, the original version contains minor revisions such as special effect enhancements.

Netflix began online streaming of five of the six Star Trek television series on July 1, 2011; Deep Space Nine followed on October 1, 2011.

== Films ==
The Original Series films

Star Trek creator Gene Roddenberry first suggested the idea of a Star Trek feature in 1969. When the original television series was canceled, he lobbied to continue the franchise through a film. The success of the series in syndication convinced the studio to begin work on a feature film in 1975. A series of writers attempted to craft a suitably epic screenplay, but the attempts did not satisfy Paramount, so the studio scrapped the project in 1977. Paramount instead planned on returning the franchise to its roots with a new television series (Phase II). The massive worldwide box office success of Star Wars in mid-1977 sent Hollywood studios to their vaults in search of similar sci-fi properties that could be adapted or re-launched to the big screen. Following the huge opening of Columbia's Close Encounters of the Third Kind in late December 1977, production of Phase II was canceled in favor of making a Star Trek film. Beginning with Star Trek: The Motion Picture in 1979, it was followed by five sequels, Star Trek II: The Wrath of Khan (1982), Star Trek III: The Search for Spock (1984), Star Trek IV: The Voyage Home (1986), Star Trek V: The Final Frontier (1989) and Star Trek VI: The Undiscovered Country (1991). Leonard Nimoy directed Star Treks III and IV, while William Shatner directed Star Trek V.

Reboot films (The Kelvin Timeline)

After the poor reception of the final Next Generation film Nemesis and the cancellation of the television series Enterprise, the franchise's executive producer Rick Berman and screenwriter Erik Jendresen began developing a new film, titled Star Trek: The Beginning, which would take place after Enterprise but before The Original Series. In February 2007, J. J. Abrams accepted Paramount's offer to direct the new film, having been previously attached as producer. Roberto Orci and Alex Kurtzman wrote a screenplay that impressed Abrams, featuring new actors portraying younger versions of the original series' cast. The Enterprise, its interior, and the original uniforms were redesigned.

This revival of the franchise is often considered to be a reboot, but is also a continuation of the franchise, with Nimoy reprising his role of the elderly Spock. This route was taken to free the new films from the restrictions of established continuity without completely discarding it, which the writers felt would have been "disrespectful". This new reality was informally referred to by several names, including the "Abramsverse", "JJ Trek" and "NuTrek", before it was named the "Kelvin Timeline" (versus the "Prime Timeline" of the original series and films) by Michael and Denise Okuda for use in official Star Trek reference guides and encyclopedias. The name Kelvin comes from USS Kelvin, a starship involved in the event that creates the new reality in Star Trek (2009). Abrams named the starship after his grandfather Henry Kelvin, whom he also pays tribute to in Into Darkness with the Kelvin Memorial Archive.

The three films in the Kelvin Timeline include Star Trek (2009), Star Trek Into Darkness (2013) and Star Trek Beyond (2016). The last was dedicated to Nimoy, who died in 2015, and Anton Yelchin, who died in a car crash in the summer it was released.

== Merchandising ==
Star Trek: The Original Series has inspired many commercial products, including toys, comic books, and many other materials. The comics are generally considered non-canonical.

=== Action figures ===
In the early 1970s, the Mego Corporation acquired the license to produce Star Trek action figures, which the company successfully marketed from 1974 to 1976. During this period, the company produced a line of 8" figures featuring Captain Kirk, Mr. Spock, Leonard McCoy, Mr. Scott, Lt. Uhura, "Aliens" (a Klingon, a Neptunian, the Keeper, a Gorn, a Cheron, a Romulan, a Talosian, an Andorian, and a Mugato), and numerous playsets. (Mego also produced a "life-size" toy tricorder.)

In the mid-2000s, Paul "Dr. Mego" Clarke and Joe Sena founded EMCE Toys (pronounced "MC") to bring Mego toys back to the marketplace. (Mego went out of business in 1983.) Working with Diamond Select Toys, current holders of the Star Trek license, these figures have been selling in comics shops. New characters are currently being produced that Mego did not originally make, such as Lt. Sulu, Ensign Chekov, and "Space Seed" villain Khan Noonien Singh. The Gorn that Mego produced had a brown Lizard head (identical to the Marvel Comics villain) on a brown body wearing a Klingon outfit. Star Trek fans had frequently wished that Mego had made a "TV-accurate" Gorn; EMCE Toys and DST produced a new green Gorn based on the TV episode "Arena". EMCE Toys hired original Mego packaging artist Harold Schull to illustrate new artwork for Sulu, Chekov, Khan, and the Gorn. EMCE Toys is continuing the Mego revival with the production of more Star Trek figures, including Captain Pike and the Salt Vampire.

=== Comic books ===
The first Star Trek comics were published by Gold Key Comics between 1967 and 1978. These comics were highly stylized and diverged wildly from the TV series continuity. Most storylines used in the Gold Key series featured original characters and concepts, although later issues did include sequels to the original series episodes "The City on the Edge of Forever", "Metamorphosis" and "I, Mudd". Writers included George Kashdan, Arnold Drake and Len Wein. Originally they were illustrated by Alberto Giolitti, an Italian artist who had never seen the series and only had publicity photos to use as references. Since Giolitti didn't have a publicity photo of James Doohan, early issues of the series had Mr. Scott drawn differently. The original issues, most of which featured photographic covers showing images from the series, are highly collectable. They are fondly remembered by fans, and a series of reprints ("The Key Collection") of these original titles began to appear in 2004, published by Checker. The Gold Key series had a run of 61 issues. Gold Key lost the Star Trek license to Marvel Comics in 1979 (although Marvel's license from Paramount prohibited them from utilizing concepts introduced in the original series).

From 1969 to 1973, a series of weekly Star Trek comic strips ran in the British comics magazine eventually known as TV Century 21. A total of 258 issues were produced, as well as various annuals and specials. All were original stories. Two more annuals, under the Mighty TV Comic banner, also produced original Star Trek materials. In addition, the weekly TV Comic reprinted serialized versions of the U.S. Gold Key comics.

In 1977–1978, before home video was widely available, Mandala Productions and Bantam Books published FotoNovels of TOS that included direct adaptations of actual color television episode frames (with word balloons) in comics format.

From February 1984 through February 1996, DC Comics held the license to publish comic books based upon the Star Trek franchise, including Star Trek: The Original Series. The main DC Comics Star Trek title was published in two series, comprising 136 issues, 9 annuals, and a number of special issues, plus several mini-series that linked TOS and the subsequent series Star Trek: The Next Generation (TNG).

Marvel Comics again obtained the Star Trek license in 1996. Marvel (under the "Marvel/Paramount comics" imprint) published various one-shots and the quarterly Star Trek Unlimited series, which covered TOS as well as TNG. They also introduced the new series Star Trek: Early Voyages, which dealt with Christopher Pike's adventures as captain of the Enterprise (as depicted in the rejected TOS pilot "The Cage"). Fan acceptance of these comics got off to a shaky start when Marvel's inaugural publication of its new Star Trek line turned out to be a crossover between TOS and Marvel's popular superhero team, the X-Men. However, the series turned out to be relatively popular, registering strong sales.

Beginning in 2006, Tokyopop published two projects based upon the original series. The new comic anthologies, produced by Joshua Ortega, were released annually in September 2006 (Shinsei Shinsei) and 2007 (Kakan ni Shinkou). Five artists and writer teams presented five new stories, per volume, based on the original series.

== Legacy and cultural influence ==
=== Parodies ===
The Original Series has been parodied many times in other television series. Saturday Night Live produced two famous sketches parodying The Original Series, "The Last Voyage of the Starship Enterprise" in 1976 and William Shatner's own "Get a life" sketch in 1986 (which parodied the show's "trekkie" followers). "The Last Voyage of the Starship Enterprise" is a twelve-minute sketch, written by Michael O'Donoghue. It was described by TrekMovie.com as "one of the best Star Trek parody sketches of all time". TVSquad ranked Shatner's "Get a life" sketch alongside "The Last Voyage ..." as one of the most famous parodies of the show.

The Canadian comedy duo Wayne and Shuster parodied Star Trek as Star Schtick in the late 1970s. An entire Finnish parody series Star Wreck was produced starting in 1992, culminating with Star Wreck: In the Pirkinning in 2005, all available as legal downloads on the web.

The series has also been parodied on The Simpsons, Family Guy and notably in the Futurama episode "Where No Fan Has Gone Before", which was described by Wired magazine as a "touchstone" for fans. The 1999 film Galaxy Quest portrays the lives of a once-popular television space-drama crew who are kidnapped by real aliens who have mistaken the fictional series for reality. The main characters are parodies of Star Trek characters, and many of the plot elements refer to or parody popular 1960s TV-series customs. On Adult Swim's FishCenter Live, a parody of the USS Enterprise was featured called the "USS FishCenterprise NCC-1065".

The series was also parodied in print as "Star Blecch" in the December 1967 issue of Mad Magazine (Issue #115).

John Scalzi's novel Redshirts, winner of the 2013 Hugo Award for Best Novel, uses the theme of red-shirted Star Fleet officers as cannon fodder.

(T)raumschiff Surprise – Periode 1 (2004) is a movie directed by Michael Herbig which parodies Star Trek and Star Wars.

=== Fan productions ===
Star Trek has inspired many fans to produce stories for free Internet distribution. Many of these are set in the time of The Original Series, including Star Trek: Phase II which was nominated for a Hugo Award and received support from actors and writers who were involved with The Original Series.

"Star Trek: Continues" chronicles the last year of the 5-year voyage of The Enterprise. Gene Roddenberry's son, "Rod", announced after a showing in 2014 that this series would have been considered canon by his father. Comprising 11 full episodes and numerous additional materials, Star Trek: Continues was produced from 2013 to 2017 and funded by a kickstarter.

=== Series sequels ===
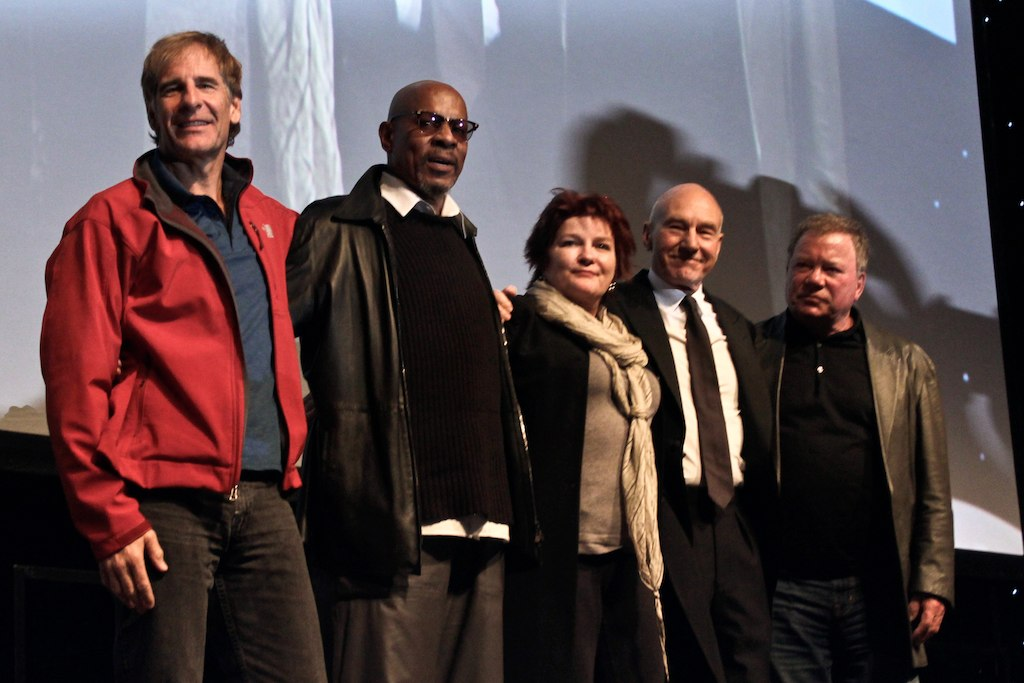
The Captains, together in London at Destination Star Trek

The original Star Trek was followed in 1973 and beyond with more shows set in the same shared universe. The subsequent series include:

- The Animated Series (1973–1974)
- The Next Generation (1987–1994, films)
- Deep Space Nine (1993–1999)
- Voyager (1995–2001)
- Enterprise (2001–2005)
- Discovery (2017–2024)
- Star Trek: Short Treks (2018–2020)
- Picard (2020–2023)
- Lower Decks (2020–2024)
- Prodigy (2021–2024)
- Very Short Treks (2023)
- Strange New Worlds (2022–present)
- Starfleet Academy (2026–present)

== Reception ==
Rod Serling said of the series that "Star Trek was again a very inconsistent show which at times sparkled with true ingenuity and pure science fiction approaches. At other times it was more carnival-like, and very much more the creature of television than the creature of a legitimate literary form."

Isaac Asimov and Star Trek creator Gene Roddenberry developed a unique relationship during Star Trek's initial run in the late 1960s. Asimov wrote a critical essay on Star Trek's scientific accuracy for TV Guide magazine. Roddenberry retorted respectfully with a personal letter explaining the limitations of accuracy when writing a weekly series. Asimov corrected himself with a follow-up essay to TV Guide claiming despite its inaccuracies, that Star Trek was a fresh and intellectually challenging science fiction television show. The two remained friends to the point where Asimov even served as an adviser on a number of Star Trek projects.

On review aggregator Rotten Tomatoes, Season 1 received an approval rating of 71% based on 41 reviews. The critical consensus reads, "An optimistic ode to humanity, Star Trek may look dated, but its gadgetry and solid storytelling solidify its place as one of pop culture's most enduring franchises." Season 2 received an approval rating of 100% based on 6 reviews, with an average rating of 7.33/10. Season 3 received an approval rating of 50% based on 10 reviews, with an average rating of 5.5/10. The critical consensus reads, "Budget cuts leave the stars of Star Trek stranded among shoddy set pieces and clunky writing – though even at its worst fans may still enjoy its campy delights."

In 2016, in a listing that included each Star Trek film and TV series together, this series was ranked first by the L.A. Times, ahead of the 1982 film Star Trek II: The Wrath of Khan and Star Trek: Deep Space Nine, in third place.

In 2017, Vulture ranked the original Star Trek the third best live-action Star Trek television show, while at the same time praising it for "laying down the foundation".

In 2018, IndieWire ranked Star Trek the original series as the 8th best space science fiction show set in outer space, including 18 overall shows from this genre.

In 2018, Io9/Gizmodo ranked the fictional spacecraft design shown in this television series, the Enterprise, as the number one best version of starship Enterprise of the Star Trek franchise. They felt that the original design was still superior to almost a dozen different later versions.

In 2019, Nerdist ranked the original series number one best out of seven Star Trek franchise television series, including up to the second season of Star Trek: Discovery.

In 2019, Popular Mechanics ranked Star Trek the 6th best science fiction television show ever.

In 2021, Empire magazine ranked it the 36th greatest television show ever.

== See also ==
- "Beam me up, Scotty"
- Outline of Star Trek
- Timeline of Star Trek
