= Huerta (surname) =

Huerta is a Spanish surname. It is a toponym derived from the word huerta, meaning "vegetable garden". Notable people with the surname include:

== Artists ==
- Elena Huerta Muzquiz (1908–1997), Mexican artist
- Gaspar de la Huerta (1645–1714), Spanish artist
- Gerard Huerta (born 1952), American typographer and graphic designer
- Hugo Huerta Marin (born 1985), Mexican artist
- Jean de la Huerta (1413–1462), Spanish sculptor
- Salomón Huerta, Mexican-American painter

== Entertainers ==
- Baldemar Garza Huerta (1937–2006), Mexican-American musician better known as Freddy Fender
- Clara Oriol de la Huerta (1884–1967), Mexican pianist
- Cris Huerta (1935–2004), Portuguese actor
- Jesse Huerta (born 1982), member of the Mexican pop duo Jesse & Joy
- Jesús Alfonso Huerta Escoboza (1966–2020), Mexican wrestler better known as La Parka II
- Joy Huerta (born 1986), member of the Mexican pop duo Jesse & Joy
- Paz de la Huerta (born 1984), Spanish-American actress and model
- Rodolfo Guzmán Huerta (1917–1984), a Mexican wrestler and actor better known as El Santo
- Tenoch Huerta (born 1981), Mexican actor

== Politicians ==
- Adolfo de la Huerta (1881–1955), President of Mexico
- Aníbal Huerta, Peruvian politician
- Arsenio Lope Huerta (1943–2021), Spanish writer and politician
- Eleazar Huerta Valcárcel (1903–1974), Spanish poet and politician
- Fernando Bustamante Huerta (born 1940), Chilean politician
- José Huerta (1948–2019), Peruvian politician
- Juan Huerta Montero (1964–2010), Mexican politician
- Lorena Ruiz-Huerta (born 1977), Spanish politician
- Manuel Rafael Huerta (born 1960), Mexican politician
- María de Jesús Huerta (born 1951), Mexican politician
- Mario Miguel Carrillo Huerta (born 1947), Mexican politician
- Mauro Huerta Díaz (born 1967), Mexican politician
- Miguel Barbosa Huerta (1959–2022), Mexican politician
- Ramón Martín Huerta (1957–2005), Mexican politician
- Roberto Huerta (1917–2003), Argentinian politician
- Víctor Ernesto González Huerta (born 1964), Mexican politician
- Victoriano Huerta (1850–1916), President of Mexico

== Sportspeople ==
=== American football ===
- Carlos Huerta (born 1969), American football player
- Marcelino Huerta (1924–1985), American football player and coach

=== Association football ===
- César Huerta (born 2000), Mexican football player
- Felipe Sanchón Huerta (born 1982), Spanish football player
- Guillermo Huerta (born 1966), Mexican football player and manager
- Gustavo Huerta (born 1957), Chilean football player and manager
- Jaime Huerta (born 1987), Peruvian football player
- Juan Huerta (born 1980), Argentinian football player
- Mario Sanchez Huerta, Mexican football player
- Osmán Huerta (born 1989), Chilean football player
- Sofia Huerta (born 1992), American football player
- Ulises Jaimes Huerta (born 1996), Mexican football player
- Valber Huerta (born 1993), Chilean football player

=== Boxing ===
- Charles Huerta (born 1986), American boxer
- Miguel Ángel Huerta (born 1978), Mexican boxer

=== Rowing ===
- Fernando Climent Huerta (born 1958), Spanish rower
- Gabriela Huerta (born 1983), Mexican rower
- Jesús Huerta (born 1980), Mexican rower

=== Other sports ===
- Arturo Huerta (born 1964), Canadian race walker
- Francisco Huerta (born 1947), Mexican cyclist
- Irma Huerta (born 1969), Mexican freestyle swimmer
- Manuel Huerta (born 1984), Cuban triathlete
- Mayra Huerta (born 1970), Mexican beach volleyball player
- Roger Huerta (born 1983), American mixed martial arts fighter

== Writers ==
- Christian de la Huerta, Cuban-American writer
- David Huerta (1949–2022), Mexican poet
- Efraín Huerta (1914–1982), Mexican poet and journalist
- Javier O. Huerta, Mexican-American poet
- Jorge Huerta (born 1942), American author and theatre director
- Màxim Huerta (born 1971), Spanish writer and journalist
- Vincent Garcia de la Huerta (1734–1787), Spanish writer and poet
- Vicente Antonio García de la Huerta (1734–1787), Spanish dramatist

== Others ==
- Alvaro Huerta, American academic
- Carlos de la Torre Huerta (1858–1950), Cuban naturalist
- Dolores Huerta (1930–2026), Mexican-American union leader
- Elmer Huerta (born 1952), Peruvian physician
- Esteban Huertas López (1876–1943), Colombian and Panamanian military commander
- Felix Huerta (fl. 1859–1892), Spanish friar
- Guadalupe Huerta (1920–2000), American activist
- Héctor Huerta Ríos (died 2019), Mexican drug lord
- Ismael Huerta (1916–1997), Chilean admiral
- Jesús Huerta de Soto (born 1956), Spanish economist
- Marina Huerta (born 1968), Argentinian physicist
- Michael Huerta (born 1956), American government official
- Salvador Flores Huerta (1934–2018), Mexican bishop

== See also ==
- Huerta (disambiguation)
- Huertas (surname)
