= Horta =

Horta may refer to:

== People ==
- Horta (surname), a list of people
- Horta Inta-A Na Man, Bissau-Guinean general and transitional president

== Places ==
- Horta, Africa, an ancient city and former bishopric in Africa Proconsularis, now in Tunisia and a Latin Catholic titular see
- Horta, Azores, Portugal, a municipality and city on the island of Faial
- Horta (district), Portugal, a former district of the Azores
- Horta, Portugal, a civil parish in the municipality of Vila Nova de Foz Côa
- Horta, Barcelona, Spain, a neighborhood in the Horta-Guinardó district of Barcelona
- Horta (Italy), an ancient city
- Horta of Valencia, a horticultural region in Central Valencia and a historic comarca of the Valencian Community
  - Horta Nord, present-day comarca in the Valencian Community
  - Horta Sud, present-day comarca in the Valencian Community
  - Horta Oest, present-day comarca in the Valencian Community

== Transportation ==
- Horta station (Barcelona), the northern terminus of Barcelona metro line 5
- Horta premetro station, Saint-Gilles, Belgium
- Horta Airport, Azores, Portugal

== Other uses ==
- Horta (mythology), a goddess in Etruscan mythology
- Horta (food), Greek boiled green vegetables
- UA Horta, a football club based in Barcelona
- Horta or huerta, a fertile area or field in Portuguese, Catalan and Galician
- HORTA (mining), an underground geographic positioning technology used in mining
- Horta, an intelligent lifeform in the Star Trek episode "The Devil in the Dark"

== See also ==
- Huerta (disambiguation)
- Hortus botanicus, botanical garden
