= 2009 Concertación presidential primary =

Chilean political primary

Concertación presidential primary, 2009
- April 5, 2009
- Turnout: 924,465 (6.75%)
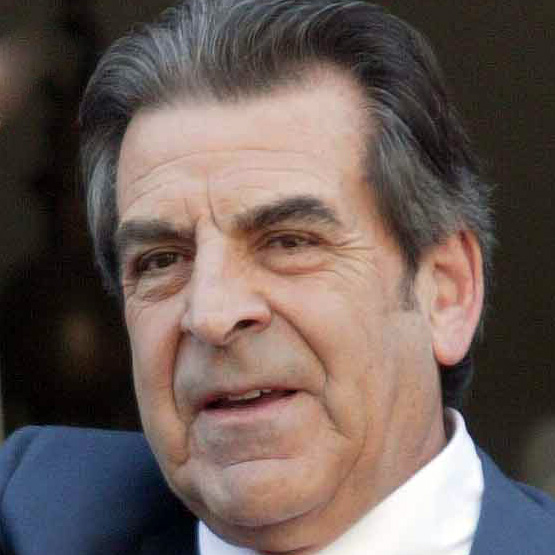

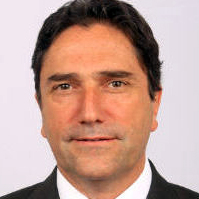
Candidate	Eduardo Frei Ruiz-Tagle	José Antonio Gómez Urrutia
Party	PDC	Social Democrat Radical
Popular vote	40,140	21,703
Percentage	64.91%	35.09%
Previous Presidential Candidate
Michelle Bachelet
Socialist
Presidential Candidate
Eduardo Frei Ruiz-Tagle
PDC

The presidential primaries of the Concertación de Partidos por la Democracia of 2009 were the method of election of the presidential candidate of such a Chilean coalition for the 2009 presidential election. Eduardo Frei Ruiz-Tagle, former President of Chile (1994–2000), a member of the Christian Democrat Party (PDC) and candidate for his party, the Socialist Party of Chile (PS) and the Party for Democracy (PPD), and José Antonio Gómez, a militant and candidate of the Radical Social Democratic Party.

After having established different regional dates, on the condition that the candidate was immediately proclaimed winner of the contestant by twenty percentage points or more, only the first date, on April 5, 2009, was made in the Region of O'Higgins and in the Maule Region. Eduardo Frei Ruiz-Tagle, who was proclaimed candidate of the Concertación that same night, was elected by 64.9% of the votes, becoming in this way the only militant of the conglomerate that has won two primaries, and therefore, the only one who has been a presidential candidate in two elections, having defeated Ricardo Lagos with a similar percentage in the 1993 primary.

Frei would obtain 29.6% in the presidential election, happening to the balotaje of the 17 of January 2010 together with Sebastián Piñera, candidate of the Coalition for the Change. However, Piñera was elected in the second round with 51.61% of the preferences, compared to 48.39% obtained by the Concertación candidate.

== Background ==
Already since the beginning of the government of Michelle Bachelet, the first candidates of the ruling party for the 2009 elections were outlined, including the senator and former presidential candidate in 2005, Soledad Alvear, OAS Secretary General José Miguel Insulza and former President Ricardo Lagos. Despite leaving with advantage, over time Alvear lost ground in polls, leaving Lagos as the best positioned to face Sebastián Piñera, candidate of the Alliance for Chile, which would later be called Coalition for Change. However, some leaders raised the idea that if the last two presidents had been the so-called "Progressive wing" of the Concertación (PS-PPD), the coalition candidate in the 2009 election should be a Christian Democrat.

After the municipal elections, where the Alliance won the Concertación for the first time in an election since the return of democracy, Soledad Alvear resigned as President of the Christian Democrats and his pre-presidential candidacy. This situation catapulted the pre-candidate of the senator and former president Eduardo Frei Ruiz-Tagle as the candidate of the PDC. Ricardo Lagos during the month of October announced that he would not run for the presidency, leaving Jose Miguel Insulza as the main letter of the "progressive wing", but his lack of decision as to whether he would accept the nomination and resign his position in Washington DC, It implied to lose the support of the PPD and even of part of its party, the PS. The polls showed a clear advantage of Frei over Insulza and he would finally give up the possibility of participating in a presidential election.

The Radical Social Democratic Party (PRSD), meanwhile, announced that for the first time it would participate with a pre-candidate in the Concertación primaries process, raising the nomination of its president and senator for the Antofagasta Region, José Antonio Gómez. 2008 had given a glimpse of a possible candidate, only with the fall of Insulza became a real alternative against Frei, which had the support of the three major parties of the Concertación.

== Format ==
Unlike the previous processes, the Concertación parties agreed to carry out "staggered" primary elections, that is, divided into different dates for each group of regions, in a manner similar to the system used by United States parties. This would have as main advantages, that the candidates could cross the regions in a more detailed way, and the savings to carry out campaign at national level.

It was established that in the event that on one of the dates any of the candidates exceeded the other by 20% or more, the following dates would not be made and at that moment would be proclaimed candidate of the Concertación who had complied with the requirement. The dates originally scheduled were:

- April 5: O'Higgins and Maule.
- April 19: Arica and Parinacota, Tarapacá, Antofagasta, Atacama and Coquimbo.
- April 26: Araucanía, Los Ríos, Los Lagos, Aisen and Magallanes.
- May 3: Valparaíso.
- May 10: Biobío.
- May 17: Santiago.

The "census" or electoral census used for the primaries was that of the Electoral Service, from which all the people militants in political parties outside the Concertación were excepted. Those who were not registered in a party were also entitled to vote. The list established for the first scheduled date included a total of 924,465 people, distributed between the O'Higgins Region (421,662) and the Maule Region (502,803).

== Campaign ==
Following the registration of the candidates on January 26, 2009, the first step in the primaries was the election of April 5 in the regions of O'Higgins and Maule. In them, Frei had to secure a difference of more than 20% with his adversary, or else he would confront Gomez in the Great North, who could have greater support in that area because he was a senator from the Antofagasta Region (elected In the parliamentary elections of 2005, in which it defeated the sister of Frei, Carmen).

Despite this, the general panorama gave Frei a wide advantage, since in both regions, of the total communes (63, 33 in O'Higgins and 30 in Maule), 20 were led by mayors of the PDC-PPD-PS block, While only 2 mayors were from the PRSD. In the legislative sphere, there were 3 senators of the Concertación, all socialist militants (Juan Pablo Letelier, Jaime Gazmuri and Jaime Naranjo), and of the 7 deputies of the Concertación, three were Christian Democrats (Juan Carlos Latorre, Roberto León and Pablo Lorenzini ), two of the PPD (Jorge Tarud and Guillermo Ceroni) and one of the PS (Sergio Aguiló), compared to the only one belonging to the radicals (Alejandro Sule).

The campaign began at different times, as Gómez began touring the communes of O'Higgins and Maule in February 2009, when Frei toured Spain, where he met with King Juan Carlos I, the minister Pedro Solbes, and the Popular Party president, Mariano Rajoy. Frei formally began his campaign on March in Talca, accompanied by the presidents of the parties that backed him, Juan Carlos Latorre (PDC), Pepe Auth (PPD) and Camilo Escalona (PS). Frei's campaign closing ceremony, held in Rancagua on April 3.

On 30 March, both candidates participated in a debate held at the Extension Center of the Universidad Católica del Maule in Talca. The transmission of the event, which was conducted by the public broadcaster Televisión Nacional de Chile, was restricted to the regions corresponding to the First primary (O'Higgins and Maule). He was led by Montserrat Álvarez, and the questions were addressed to journalists Rodrigo Siderakis (for TVN Red O'Higgins) and Esteban Sáez (for TVN Red Maule). Some of the issues addressed were the economic crisis, collusion of pharmacies, and political corruption, and although in general there was not much confrontation between the candidates, but the criticisms were concentrated in the Alliance for Chile, there were points of discordance, as in the decriminalization of induced abortion, and in the use of energy sources, whose emblematic case was the Hidroaysén project. A post-debate survey, conducted by El Mercurio, gave Frei a winner with 49% of preferences, compared to 23.9% Gómez.

The first days of April were closed the campaigns. José Antonio Gómez finished his tour for the first date of the primaries in the medialuna of the city of Santa Cruz, Region of O'Higgins, accompanied by the musical group Los Hermanos Campos. Eduardo Frei, meanwhile, held an event in Talca on April 2 with the participation of Inti-Illimani, while the next day he closed his campaign in a gymnasium in Rancagua, together with the presidents of the PS and the PDC.

== Results ==
Candidate	Party	O'Higgins Region		Maule Region		Total	
Candidate	Party	Votes	%	Votes	%	Votes	%
Eduardo Frei Ruiz-Tagle	Christian Democratic Party	16,437	62.97	23,703	66.32	40,140	64.91
José Antonio Gómez Urrutia	Radical Social Democratic Party	9,665	37.03	12,038	33.68	21,703	35.09
Total		26,102	100.00	35,741	100.00	61,843	100.00
Valid votes		26,102	99.34	35,741	98.99	61,843	99.14
Invalid votes		90	0.34	132	0.37	222	0.36
Blank votes		83	0.32	234	0.65	317	0.51
Total votes		26,275	100.00	36,107	100.00	62,382	100.00
Source: Concertación Primaries

== Reactions ==
Since José Antonio Gómez announced his candidacy for the presidency of Chile, he had to overcome the pressures of some leaders of the three major parties of the Concertación (DC, PPD, PS) that sought to withdraw before the primary, as he did voluntarily Soledad Alvear in the same process of 2005. One of them was the helmsman of the Socialist Party, Camilo Escalona, who during Frei's proclamation on April 5, 2009 in Rancagua, rebuked and insulted Gómez, accusing him of wanting to divide the Officialdom with his candidacy. The altercation was spread by all media, and generated criticism to Escalona, who must have apologized for what happened.

The process was widely criticized by parties that do not belong to the Concertación, even being described as a "failure". Most of the criticisms pointed to the fact that after the election was closed after the first date, the rest of the regions were prevented to give their opinion, contrary to what happened in the two previous primaries (1993 and 1999), in which voting was simultaneous throughout the country. This is in addition to the low participation that was in contrast to the previous primaries; 39 in the 2009 primary election voted (in the Maule and O'Higgins regions) 36.34% of those who participated in the same process of 1999 (where Ricardo Lagos and Andrés Zaldívar clashed), reflecting a deterioration Of the Concertación, and in general, of the entire political spectrum.

== Candidacy of Enríquez-Ominami ==
Socialist deputy Marco Enríquez-Ominami initiated a presidential candidacy in January 2009, which was not supported by his party, since he had already committed his support to Eduardo Frei. After having closed the inscriptions to the Concertación primaries Enríquez-Ominami confirmed on January 26, without being included as a candidate, by means of a video on the YouTube website that would nominate the Presidency of Chile as independent.

In the following months, the candidacy of Enríquez-Ominami grew considerably in the surveys, and it added support of diverse sectors. In this context, the deputy proposed the idea of a new primary – which he called "refoundational" – to face him with Frei, but this was discarded by the Christian Democrat. According to a survey by the Universidad del Desarrollo and La Segunda newspaper, published on May 15, 48% of Concertación voters supported the idea of a new primary, and if it had been done, Enríquez-Ominami would have won. After his proposal for new elections was denied Marco Enríquez-Ominami resigned from the Socialist Party on June 11.
