= Goddess of agriculture =

Goddess of agriculture may refer to:

- Ceres (Roman mythology)
- Chicōmecōātl (Aztec mythology)
- Demeter (Greek mythology)
- Horta (Etruscan mythology)
- Phouoibi (Meitei mythology)
- Toyouke-hime (Shinto religion)
