= Huerta (disambiguation) =

A huerta is an irrigated area, or a field within such an area, common in Spain and Portugal.

Huerta may also refer to:

- Huerta (surname)

== Places ==
- Huerta, Salamanca, a municipality in the province of Salamanca, Castile and León
- Huerta de Rey, a municipality in the province of Burgos, Castile and León
- Huerta de la Obispalía, a municipality in the province of Cuenca, Castilla-La Mancha
- Huerta del Marquesado, a municipality in the province of Cuenca, Castilla-La Mancha
- Huerta de Murcia, a comarca in the region of Murcia in Spain
- La Huerta, Chile in Chile
- La Huerta, Jalisco in Mexico
- La Huerta, New Mexico in the United States
- La Huerta, Parañaque in the Philippines

== See also ==
- Santa María de Huerta a municipality in Soria, Castile and León, Spain
- Huertas, a surname
- Horta (disambiguation)
