= 2005 Concertación presidential primary =

Chilean political primary

Concertación presidential primary, 2005
← 1999	July 31, 2005	2009 →
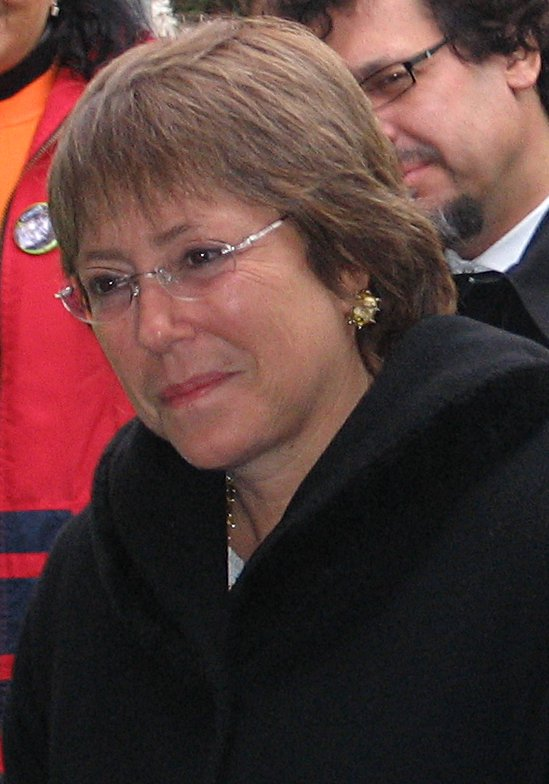

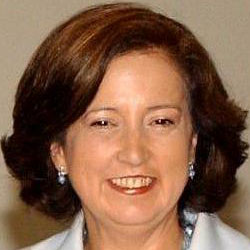
Candidate	Michelle Bachelet	Soledad Alvear (withdrawn)
Party	Socialist	PDC
Previous Presidential Candidate
Ricardo Lagos
For Democracy
Presidential Candidate
Michelle Bachelet
Socialist

The presidential primaries of the Concertation of Parties for Democracy of the year 2005 was the electoral system to define the presidential candidate of such Chilean coalition for the presidential election of 2005. It confronted Michelle Bachelet Jeria, candidate by the Socialist Party (PS), the Party for Democracy (PPD), and the Radical Social Democratic Party (PRSD), and Soledad Alvear Valenzuela, candidate for the Christian Democratic Party of Chile (PDC). However, the process remained unfinished after Alvear retired from competition months before the completion of the primary.

== Campaign and Alvear withdrawal ==
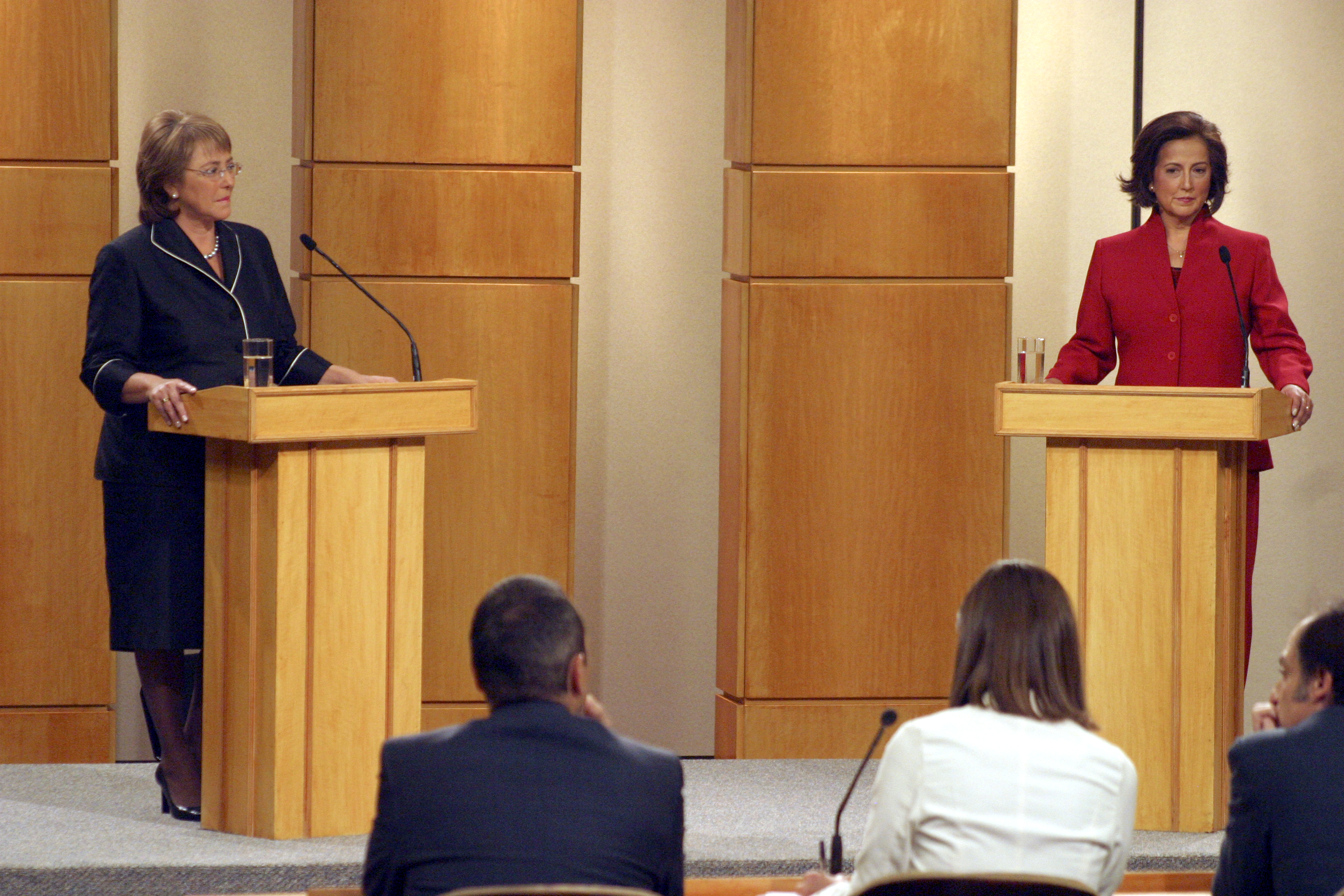
Michelle Bachelet and Soledad Alvear on a debate in Hualpén.

After defining the two presidential candidates (a unique event in the history of the country, since the Concertación would present a woman who has real chances of getting elected), began a series of meetings between both commands to define the system of election of the candidate only. Finally, on March 22, an open national election was agreed for all registered voters (except those registered in parties of another coalition), on July 31, 2005.

In addition, a series of debates were scheduled in each of the regions, of which only two would be televised nationally; The first, in Hualpén (Concepción), scheduled for April 28, 2005, 7 and the last, scheduled for July 27 of the same year in the city of Santiago. The other regional debates were scheduled in the following order: Valparaiso (May 18), note 1 Temuco (May 26), Puerto Montt (May 27), Antofagasta (June 9), Iquique (June 10), Rancagua (23 June), Talca (24 June), Copiapó (7 July), La Serena (8 July), Punta Arenas (21 July) and Coyhaique (22 July).

The campaign was not without friction between the "progressive" bloc (PS-PPD-PRSD) and the PDC, especially after statements by President Ricardo Lagos in March, when he gave a glimpse of his support for Bachelet in an interview with Televisión Nacional. Alvear reacted by stating that "I do not deserve this attitude; I trust that the President, in the course of this morning, rectify his sayings ", and received the support of his party. Lagos had to refine his comments, stating that "There are two candidates of the Concertación. They both worked loyally with me. I therefore have two candidates".

After holding two of the thirteen regional debates—those of Hualpén and Valparaíso--, on 24 May, the Christian Democratic banner declined to continue in the presidential race, leaving the only candidacy in the Concertacion to the socialist Michelle Bachelet. Both met the next day, when Bachelet failed to get Alvear to join his command PDC Senator Jorge Pizarro, declared that Alvear's resignation "has to do with the finding of a political picture that at one point could jeopardize the possibility of a new government of the Concertación" referring to the possible dispute of votes of center by the candidate of National Renovation, Sebastián Piñera, who came from a family that had strong ties with the Christian Democratic Party.
