= Manuel Huerta Ladrón de Guevara =

Mexican politician

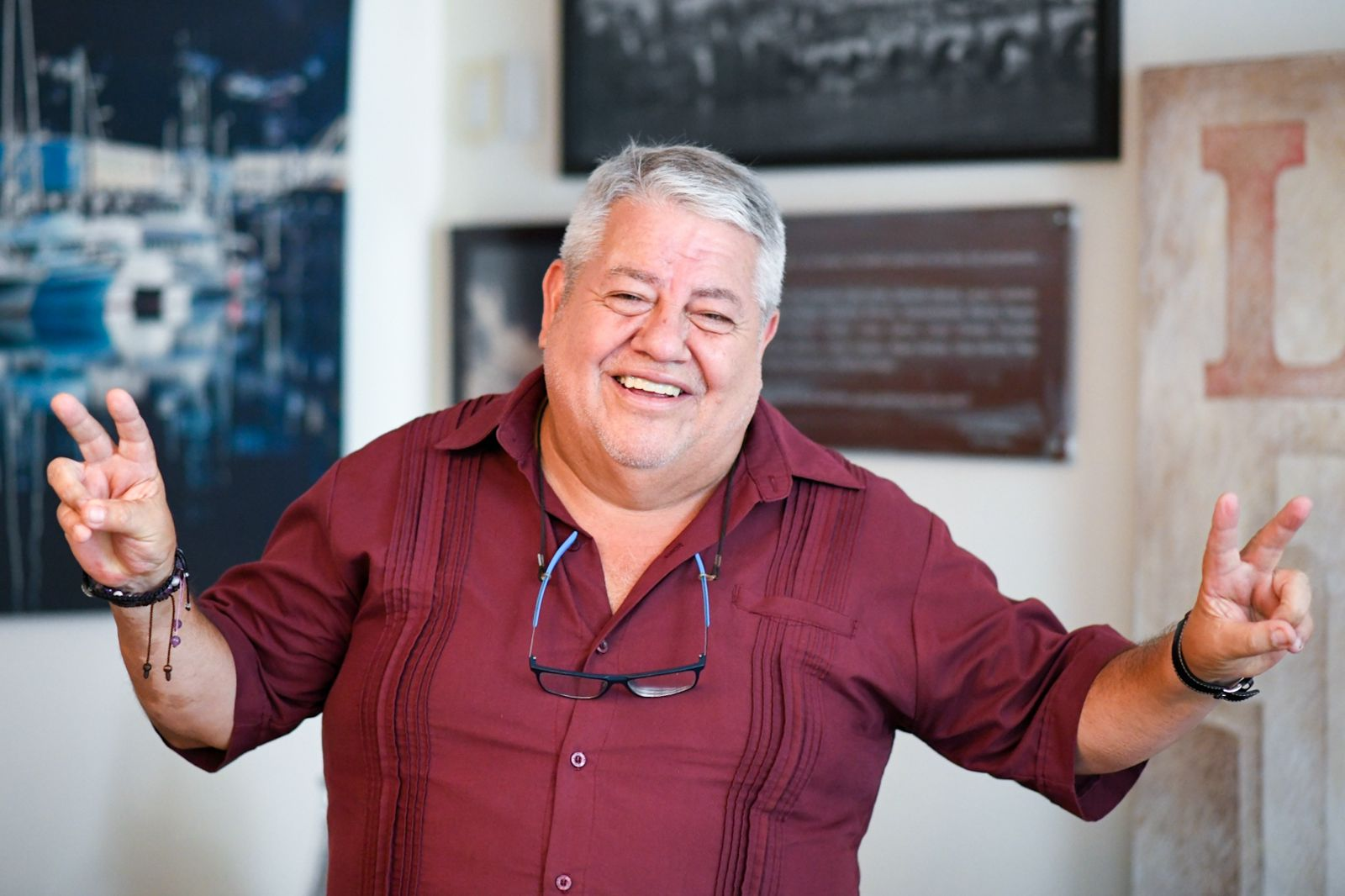
- Born: 12 July 1960 (age 66); Mexico City, Mexico
- Occupations: Politician and lawyer
- Political party: MORENA
- Other political affiliations: PRD (1989–2011)

Manuel Rafael Huerta Ladrón de Guevara (Note: In this Mexican name, the surname is Huerta and the second or maternal family name is Ladrón de Guevara.) (born 12 July 1960) is a Mexican politician. He has been elected to the federal Chamber of Deputies and the Senate and was a founding member of the Party of the Democratic Revolution (PRD) in 1989 and of the National Regeneration Movement (Morena) in 2011 (when it was a civil association rather than a political party).

== Life ==
Huerta Ladrón de Guevara graduated with a law degree from the Universidad Veracruzana. He was a plurinominal federal deputy for the third region in the 55th Congress (1991–94) with the PRD and the 52nd Congress (2012–15) representing the Federal District's 2nd district for the PT and, after February 2015, for Morena. Between 2015 and 2018, Huerta was the president of the state executive committee of Morena in Veracruz. He resigned from the party committee on 27 November 2018 in order to accept President Andrés Manuel López Obrador's invitation to become the coordinator of federal programs in the state.

He was elected as one of Veracruz's senators in the 2024 Senate election, occupying the second place on the Sigamos Haciendo Historia coalition's two-name formula.
