= Víctor Ernesto González Huerta =

Mexican politician

- Born: 20 January 1964 (age 62); Atlacomulco, State of Mexico, Mexico
- Occupation: Politician
- Political party: PRI

Víctor Ernesto González Huerta (Note: In this Mexican name, the surname is González and the second or maternal family name is Huerta.) (born 20 January 1964) is a Mexican politician affiliated with the Institutional Revolutionary Party (PRI).

González Huerta is a native of Atlacomulco, State of Mexico.

From 1997 to 2000 he was the municipal president of Ixtapan del Oro, State of Mexico, and, in the 2003 mid-terms, he was elected to the Chamber of Deputies to represent the State of Mexico's 23rd district during the 59th session of Congress.
