= Fernando Bustamante Huerta =

Chilean accountant, businessperson and politician (born 1940)

- Bustamante in 2018

Personal details
- Born: 17 January 1940 (age 86) Chile
- Party: Socialist Party
- Profession: Accountant; businessperson

Fernando Bustamante Huerta (born 17 January 1940) is a Chilean accountant, businessman and socialist politician, known for his close collaboration with Salvador Allende and Ricardo Lagos.

== Background ==
Huerta studied at the Liceo José Victorino Lastarria in the capital and at a commercial institute.

Huerta when he was very young joined the oil company Royal Dutch Shell, company. He remained with the company for eleven years. During this period he used to pursue the career of an auditor, accountant at the University of Chile in evening classes.

He left the Company in 1970, after Joining in an active union work. It happened then to the state Enap at the beginning of the Government of Salvador Allende, who recognized him as one of the most qualified technicians in the Socialist Party.

== the coup d'état ==
After the coup d'état of September 11, 1973, he refused to leave Chile despite being detained and tortured, when he voluntarily reported the Intendency of Rancagua, in the central zone. The aftermath of that episode they forced him to exercises daily.

During Military dictatorship of Chile (1973–1990) he exploited his Academic term, took courses in tax management and business administration at the University of Chile. At the same time, he began consulting companies in various sectors, that in some cases he became a shareholder, like the Coppelia tea room in the capital (he left this business in 1998).

Ricardo Froilán Lagos who served as President of Chile from 2000 to 2006, met Fernando in the 80s when he returned to Chile, from his own-exile, and their relationship became so close and Lagos considered one of his closest and most influential friends.

He later joined the presidential campaign of Ricardo Lagos, contributing and managing the campaign of Concertación presidential primary, 1999.

Lagos appointed him president of the directory of Santiago Metro Line 4, where he led the implementation of the Line 4 to High Bridge, in the South zone of the capital.

In parallel, he served as director of Telefónica Chile.

After assuming the government, Michelle Bachelet left her position at the company to Blas Tomić and concentrated on the private world as an Entrepreneurial economics and consultant.
