= Huertas =

Huertas is a Spanish surname. It is a plural variant of the toponym Huerta. Notable people with the surname include:

- Adrián Huertas (born 2003), Spanish motorcycle racer
- Antonio Huertas (born 1964), Spanish chief executive
- Antonio Escobar Huertas (1879–1940), Spanish military officer
- Begoña Huertas (1965–2022), Spanish writer and journalist
- Carlos Huertas (born 1991), Colombian racing driver
- Carlos Huertas (vallenato composer) (1934–1999), Colombian musician
- David Huertas (born 1987), Puerto Rican basketball player
- Esteban Huertas (1876–1943), Panamanian military officer
- Guy de Huertas (1926–1997), French alpine skier
- Joel Huertas (born 1995), Spanish football player
- Jon Huertas (born 1969), American actor
- Jorge Arturo Mendoza Huertas (born 1971), Peruvian mental calculator
- José Huertas González (born 1947), Puerto Rican wrestler
- Juan Huertas, Panamanian boxer
- Liliana del Carmen La Rosa Huertas (born 1964), Peruvian nurse, academic and government minister
- Marcelo Huertas (born 1983), Brazilian basketball player
- Marially González Huertas, Puerto Rican politician
- Mávila Huertas (born 1970), Peruvian journalist
- Miguel Huertas (born 1977), Peruvian football player
- Raphel Ortiz Huertas (born 1975), Puerto Rican football player
- Raquel Huertas (born 1982), Spanish field hockey player

== See also ==
- 21636 Huertas, a main-belt asteroid
- Cortes (Madrid), an administrative ward also known as Huertas
- Huerta (surname)
- Huerta (disambiguation)
