= 1999 Concertación presidential primary =

Chilean political primary

Concertación presidential primary, 1999
← 1993	May 30, 1999	2005 →
- Registered: 7 613 915
- Turnout: 18%
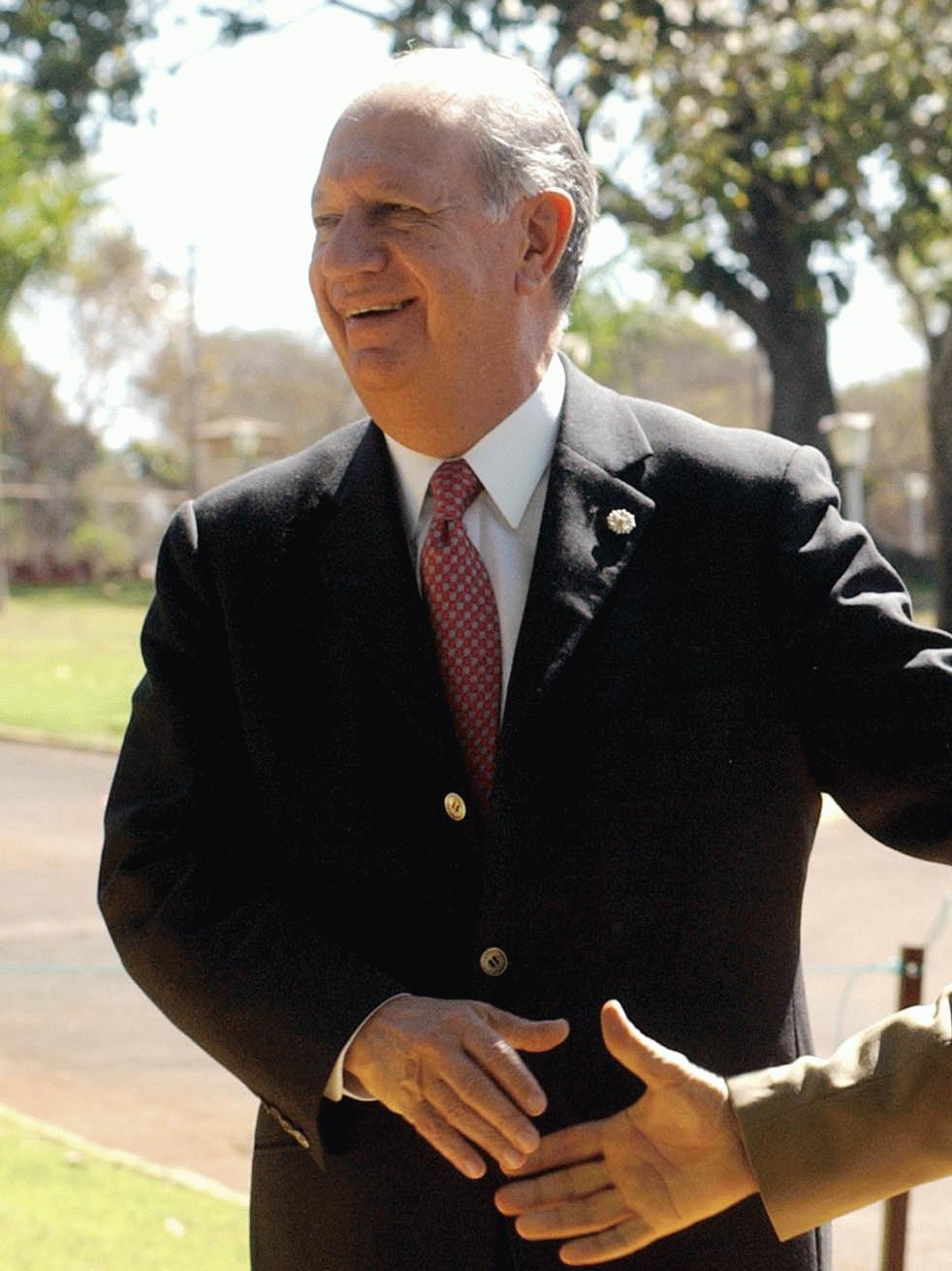

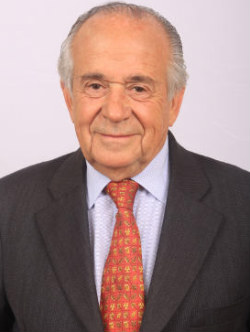
Candidate	Ricardo Lagos	Andrés Zaldívar
Party	For Democracy	PDC
Popular vote	985.505	398.821
Percentage	71.19%	28.81%
Previous Presidential Candidate
Eduardo Frei Ruiz-Tagle
PDC
Presidential Candidate
Ricardo Lagos
For Democracy

The presidential primaries of the Concertación de Partidos por la Democracia of 1999 were the electoral system to define the presidential candidate of such Chilean coalition for the 1999 presidential election. It was an innovation of the conglomerate when nominating for the first time its candidate through a primary direct and binding election, unlike the primary of 1993.

It was contested between Ricardo Lagos, candidate for the Socialist Party of Chile (PS), the Party for Democracy (PPD), the Radical Social Democratic Party (PRSD) and the Liberal Party (PL), and Andrés Zaldívar, candidate for the Christian Democratic Party (PDC).

== Campaign and election ==
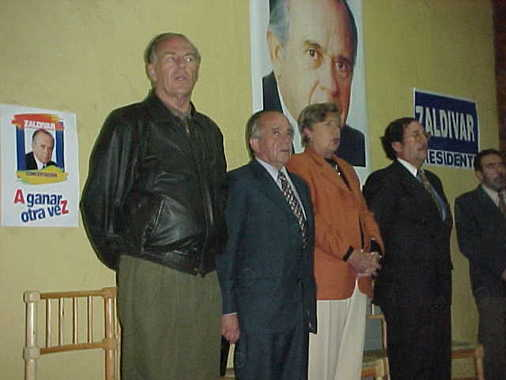
Zaldívar and others during campaign.

The presidential campaign of 1999 was marked by the economic crisis that affected the country. The government of Eduardo Frei Ruiz-Tagle was badly beaten with unemployment rates close to 11% and negative growth. Due to the existence of several presidential candidates within the different political parties of the Concertación, the single presidential candidate to be presented on 12 December should have been elected by means of the primary elections.

In this scenario, the main governing party - the Christian Democrats - sought their third consecutive term, shuffling the names of Gabriel Valdés Subercaseaux, Alejandro Foxley, Enrique Krauss and Andrés Zaldívar. Finally the DC raised as pre-candidate to Senator Zaldívar.

As in the 1993 primaries, Ricardo Lagos Escobar presented himself as the candidate of the left wing of the Concertación. Lagos resigned as Minister of Public Works on July 31, 1998 to focus on his presidential campaign. He began to build his campaign from the Fundación Chile XXI study center, where much of his work team was gathered.

Thus, in November 1998, the Concertación opted to hold open and binding primary elections to select its flag-bearer for the presidential elections between Lagos and Zaldívar. A National Primaries Organizing Committee was formed, made up of 10 leaders of the parties Concertación, which established 16 731 polling stations in 870 premises reprinted by all the municipalities of the country.

The election was held on Sunday, May 30, 1999, a day that was not without problems, as a power cut affected much of the country, giving rise to rumors of attack that were discarded. Finally, with more than one million two hundred thousand voters, Ricardo Lagos defeated Andrés Zaldívar with 71% of the votes, consecrating himself as the only candidate of the Concertación.

== Results ==
Candidate	Party	Endorsement	Votes	%
Ricardo Lagos Escobar	PPD/PS	PPD-PS-PRSD-PL	985 505	71,19%
Andrés Zaldívar Larraín	PDC		398 821	28,81
Total			1 384 326	100 %

=== By region ===
Region	Lagos		Zaldívar		Total
Region	Votes	%	Votes	%	Total
Tarapacá	25 307	78,02 %	7131	21,98 %	32 438
Antofagasta	31 064	78,96 %	8276	21,04 %	39 340
Atacama	21 174	78,85 %	5678	21,15 %	26 852
Coquimbo	43 825	75,27 %	14 398	24,73 %	58 223
Valparaíso	97 057	70,49 %	40 623	29,51 %	137 680
Metropolitana	413 665	73,07 %	152 485	26,93 %	566 150
O'Higgins	51 043	64,79 %	27 739	35,21 %	78 782
Maule	62 533	67,36 %	30 300	32,64 %	92 833
Biobío	125 839	71,36 %	50 512	28,64 %	176 351
Araucanía	37 175	59,46 %	25 343	40,54 %	62 518
Los Lagos	56 749	66,15 %	29 034	33,85 %	85 783
Aysén	6088	62,39 %	3670	37,61 %	9758
Magallanes	13 986	79,38 %	3632	20,62 %	17 618
