= Huerta del Marquesado =

Huerta del Marquesado, Spain
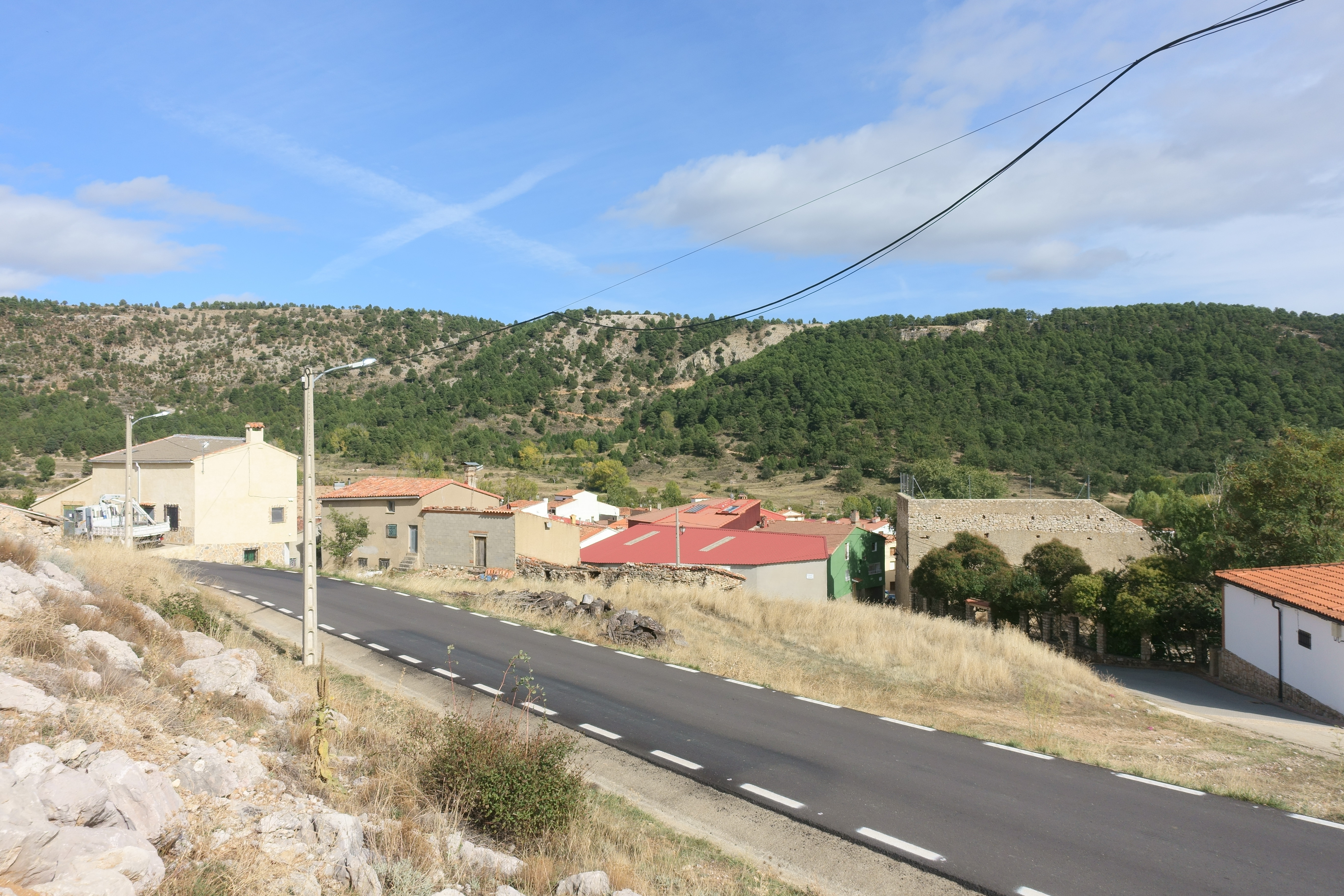

- Flag Coat of arms

- Location within Spain Location within Castilla-La Mancha
- Coordinates: 40°09′N 1°41′W
- Country: Spain
- Autonomous community: Castile-La Mancha
- Province: Cuenca
- Municipality: Huerta del Marquesado

Area
  - Total: 38 km^{2} (15 sq mi)
- Elevation: 1,257 m (4,124 ft)

Population (2025-01-01)
  - Total: 155
  - Density: 4.1/km^{2} (11/sq mi)
- Time zone: UTC+1 (CET)
  - Summer (DST): UTC+2 (CEST)

Huerta del Marquesado is a municipality located in the province of Cuenca, Castile-La Mancha, Spain. According to the 2001 census (INE), the municipality has a population of 243 inhabitants.
