= Vincent García de la Huerta =

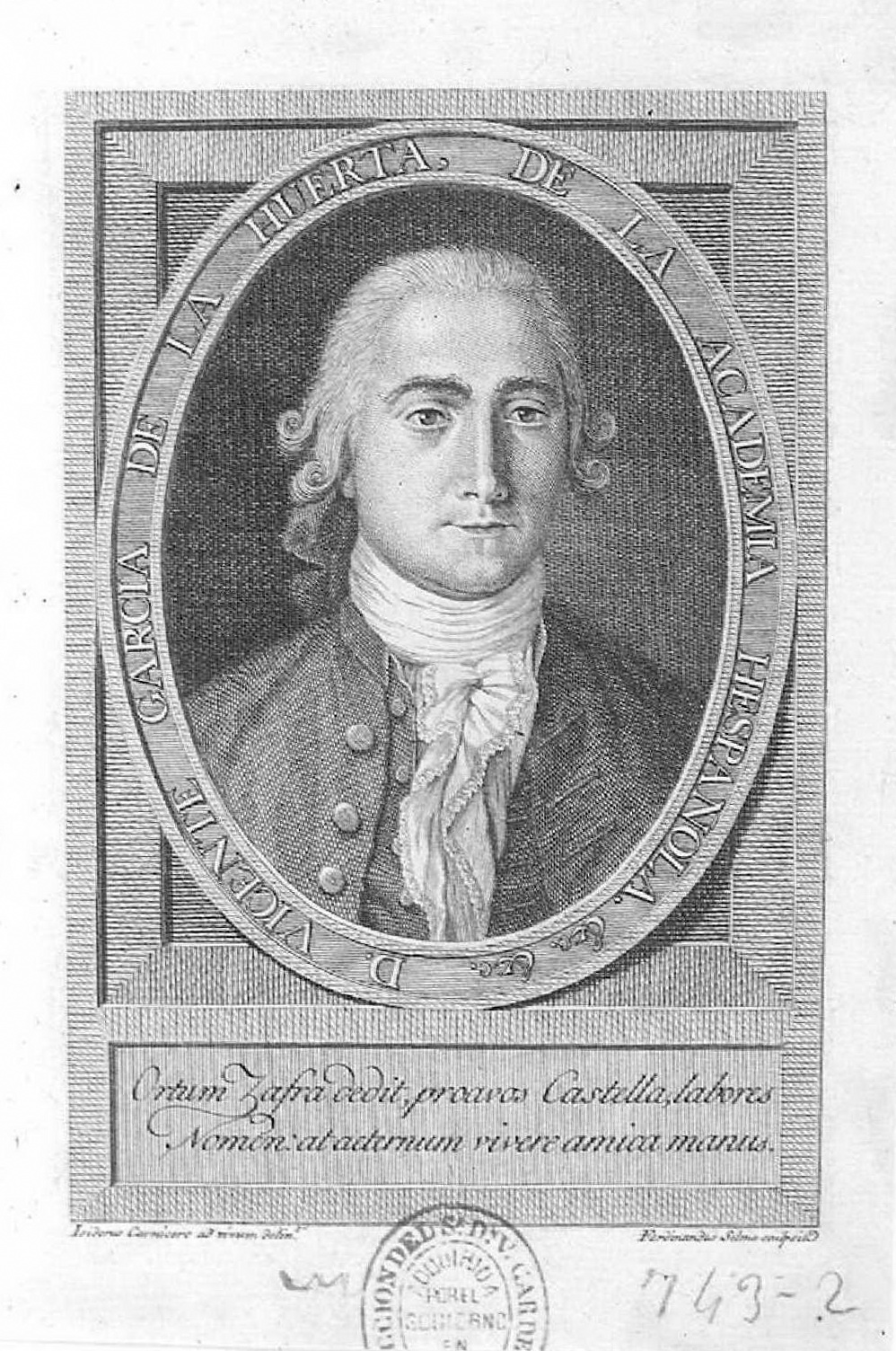
Etching of Vicente García de la Huerta by Fernando Selma and Isidro Carnicero

Vicente Antonio García de la Huerta (1734–1787) was an 18th-century Spanish poet, author, dramatist, and critic. His brother Pedro García de la Huerta was a Jesuit historian. He acquired fame with contributions to turn public attention to ancient native writers and held the following positions - head of the Antigallican literary party, member of Spanish academy, leader of the national school of poetry, chief of the National library, head of the Royal library, and others.

He was notable among Spanish for his poetical and critical talents through his principal works - La Raquel (en: Rachel), a tragedy, and Teatro Espanol (en: Spanish Theatre). He equally attracted censures from his opponents and enemies for his literary arrogance, notably, from critics of France.

== Biography ==
He was born in the city of Zamora in 1734. He was educated at the University of Salamanca. He published poems - prominent among them was Obras poeticas in 1778 -, published Military Library, and edited the Teatro Espanol(Spanish Theatre) - that contains his own tragedies in 1788. He was quite successful with his drama La Raquel(Rachel) - based upon the story of Alfonso VIII's love for the beautiful Jewess, Rachel -, which was performed in Madrid and Italy in 1778.

With his Teatro Espanol published in 17 volumes in 1785 as a collection of the best Spanish plays, he tried to vindicate Spanish literature from the criticism of Voltaire, Linguet, and others. He was also dismissed as the chief of National library due to his literary arrogance and numerous enemies.
