= Aníbal Huerta =

Peruvian politician

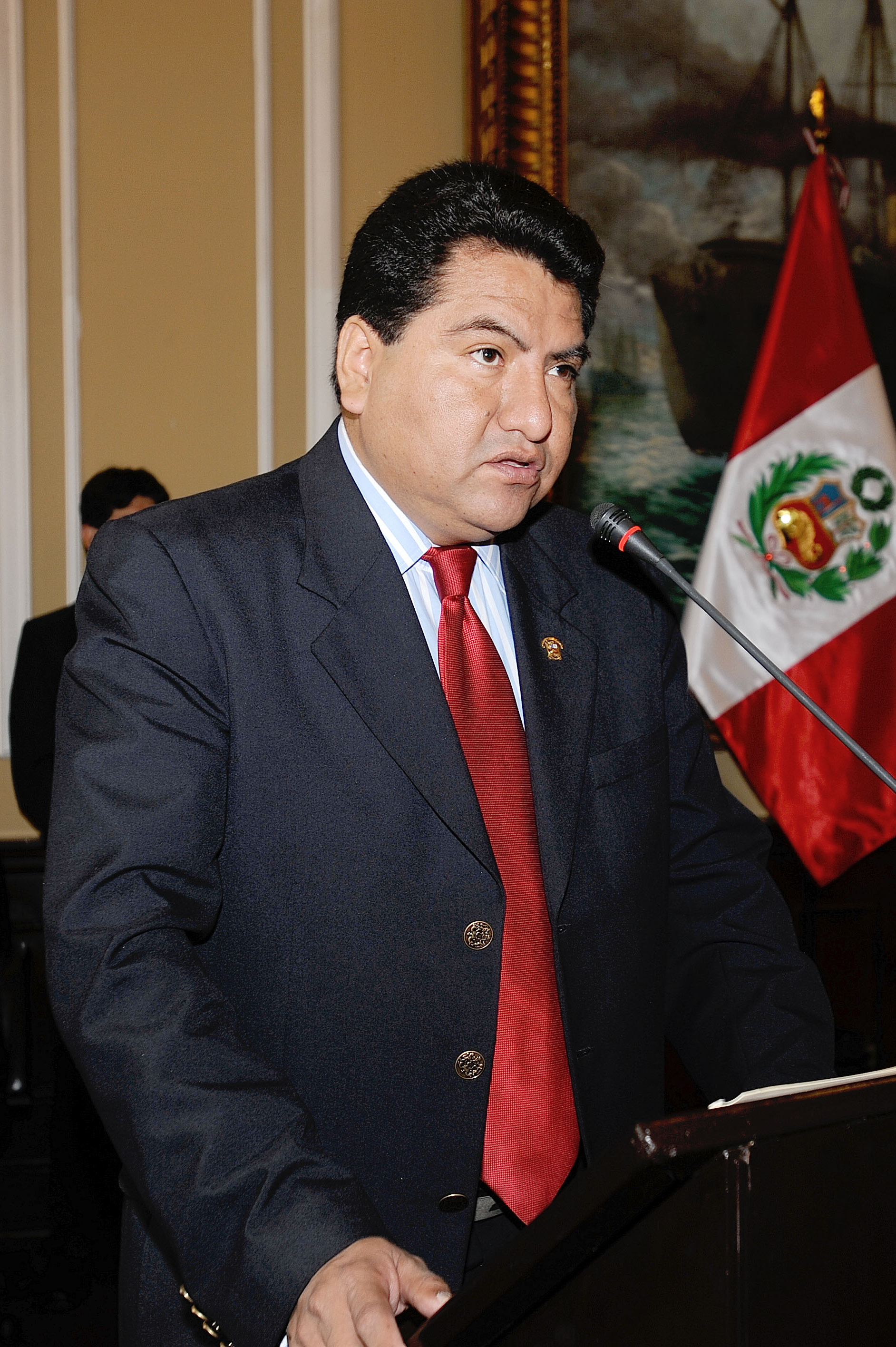
- Huerta in 2010

Member of Congress
- In office 26 July 2006 – 26 July 2011
- Constituency: Huánuco

Personal details
- Party: Peruvian Aprista Party
- Occupation: Politician

Aníbal Ovidio Huerta Díaz is a Peruvian politician. He is a former Congressman representing Huánuco for the period 2006–2011, and belongs to the Peruvian Aprista Party.
