= María de Jesús Huerta =

Mexican politician (born 1951)

- Born: 3 February 1951 (age 75); Nuevo León, Mexico
- Education: Autonomous University of Nuevo León
- Occupation: Deputy
- Political party: PRI

María de Jesús Huerta Rea (born 3 February 1951) is a Mexican politician affiliated with the PRI. She served as a federal deputy of the LXII Legislature of the Mexican Congress representing Nuevo León and previously served as a local deputy in the LXXII Legislature of the Congress of Nuevo León.
