= Alvaro Huerta =

American activist, author and scholar

Álvaro M. Huerta is an American activist, author and scholar. He currently serves as a Professor of Urban & Region Planning (URP) and Ethnic & Women’s Studies (EWS) at California State Polytechnic University, Pomona.

As a professor and researcher, Huerta focuses on community and economic development, critical race theory, identity politics, Chicana/o and Latina/o studies, immigration and Mexican diaspora, social movements, social networks and the informal economy.

== Early life ==
Born in Sacramento, California, Huerta grew up in Colonia Libertad in Tijuana, and in the Ramona Gardens housing project in East Los Angeles. He attended public inner-city schools and was the first in his family to pursue higher education. He experienced and witnessed poverty and systemic despair within the Ramona Gardens housing project.

== Education ==
Huerta earned his Bachelor's degree in History from the University of California, Los Angeles in 2003, later earning a Master's in Urban Planning in 2006. In 2011, Huerta earned a Ph.D. in City and Regional Planning from the University of California, Berkeley. Once interested in studying mathematics at UCLA, he later switched his study to obtaining a major in history, before eventually earning a Ph.D. in City and Regional planning.

== Career ==
Prior to his current Professorship, Huerta was a Research Fellow at the Latinx Education Research Center, Santa Clara University. He was also previously a visiting scholar at the Chicano Studies Research Center, University of California, Los Angeles from 2010 to 2014. From 2010 to 2013, he also served as Adjunct Faculty in the Department of Urban Planning and Cesar E. Chavez Department of Chicana/o Studies, UCLA. Huerta also served as a Religion and Public Life Organizing Fellow, Harvard Divinity School, from 2021 to 2024.

In 2023, Huerta was named a recipient of the Grant Program for Diverse Voices by the Massachusetts Institute of Technology Press (MIT Press) for his publishing “Jardineros/Gardeners: Cultivating Los Angeles’ Front Lawn with Brown Hands, Migrant Networks, and Technology”. The grant is intended to extend funding for authors covering diverse and chronically underrepresented perspectives to propel research, coverage and publishing.

In 2014, Huerta was appointed as an Associate Professor of Urban and Regional Planning and Ethnic and Women's Studies at Cal Poly Pomona. In 2025, Huerta was promoted to Professor.

In 2011, Huerta received the American Planning Association's Paul Davidoff award.

Huerta has also contributed articles related to racial and working-class issues for numerous periodicals and online outlets, such as Boyle Heights Beat and LA Progressive.

Before attending graduate school, Huerta was a community organizer in Los Angeles, and was instrumental in the defeat of a power plant in South Gate and in fighting the City of Los Angeles’ leaf-blower ban, which disproportionately affected immigrant gardeners.

In 2025, Huerta was honored with the 2025 Bruin Excellence in Civic Engagement distinction for his activism in support of Latino/a communities.

== Publications ==
- Latina/o Immigrant Communities in the Xenophobic Era of Trump and Beyond (Hamilton Books | Rowman & Littlefield, June 2019)
- Reframing the Latino Immigration Debate: Towards a Humanistic Paradigm (San Diego State University Press, 2013)
  - In such novel he asks readers to assess or reassess the political, social, economic, and cultural issues going on at the United States/Mexican Border while providing real life images of the border provided by photographer Antonio Turok.
- Lead editor of People of Color in the United States: Contemporary Issues in Education, Work, Communities, Health, and Immigration (Volume 4).
- Becoming a Chicano Scholar-Activist: Key Lessons and Takeaways (Austin: University of Texas Press, 2024)
  - Huerta wrote a chapter in part IV of the book Conditionally Accepted: Navigating Higher Education from the Margins (Austin: University of Texas Press, 2024).
- Huerta, Alvero, Reframing the Latino immigration Debate : Towards a Humanistic Paradigm (2013). San Diego University.
