= Horta (surname) =

Horta is a Portuguese surname. Notable people with the surname include:

- Adolfo Horta (1957–2016), Cuban boxer
- André Horta (born 1996), Portuguese footballer
- Andréia Horta (born 1983), Brazilian actress
- Carolina Horta (born 1992), Brazilian beach volleyball player
- Francisco Horta (born 1993), Mexican boxer
- Luís Horta (born 1952), Portuguese former footballer
- Maria Teresa Horta (1937–2025), Portuguese feminist poet, novelist, journalist, and activist
- Oscar Horta (born 1974), Spanish animal activist and moral philosopher
- Ricardo Horta (born 1994), Portuguese footballer
- Silvio Horta (1974–2020), American screenwriter and television producer
- Victor Horta (1861–1947), Belgian architect

== See also ==
- Salvador of Horta (1520–1567), Spanish saint
- José Ramos-Horta (born 1949), East Timor politician
