= Élmer Huerta =

Peruvian oncologist

Elmer Huerta
- Born: Élmer Emilio Huerta Ramírez; June 12, 1952 (age 73); Recuay, Peru
- Occupations: Medical oncologist and internist, public health specialist in epidemiology, and health communicator. Collaborator of CNN in Spanish, Univision, Telemundo, RPP Noticias y El Comercio

Élmer Emilio Huerta Ramírez (born June 12, 1952) is a Peruvian medical oncologist and internist, public health specialist in epidemiology, and health communicator based in the United States. He studied Medicine (MD) at the Faculty of Medicine San Fernando of the National University of San Marcos in Peru and a Master in Public Health (MPH) at Johns Hopkins University in the United States. He was president of the American Cancer Society between 2007 and 2008, being the first Latino president of this prestigious organization.

He founded the Cancer Preventory, which he runs, at the MedStar Washington Hospital Center Cancer Institute in Washington, D.C. He is also considered a pioneer in the use of the media for educational purposes in Latin America. As a specialist in oncology, internal medicine, and public health in epidemiology, he is the official collaborator in medical issues for the main Spanish-language media in the United States and Peru, including CNN in Spanish, Univisión, Telemundo, RPP Noticias, El Comercio and América Televisión.

== Hablemos de Salud ==
Huerta hosts Hablemos de Salud, a Spanish-language medical call-in program, with Pablo Sanchez, a health correspondent from Univision. The program deals with the health concerns of the Hispanic community. It was first broadcast locally in 1996 before being syndicated nationally, and is currently broadcast by MHz Worldview, from its Washington, D.C.-area studios.
