= Eleazar Huerta Valcárcel =

Spanish lawyer, poet and politician

Eleazar Huerta Valcárcel (22 December 1903 in Tobarra, Albacete – 1974 in Santiago de Chile) was a Spanish lawyer, poet and politician. The son of Eleazar Huerta Puche and Milagros Valcárcel García, he died in Chile, where he had lived in exile since the Spanish Civil War, aged 70. He served as the 47th Solicitor General of Spain.
