= Hugo Huerta Marin =

Mexican artist (born 1986)

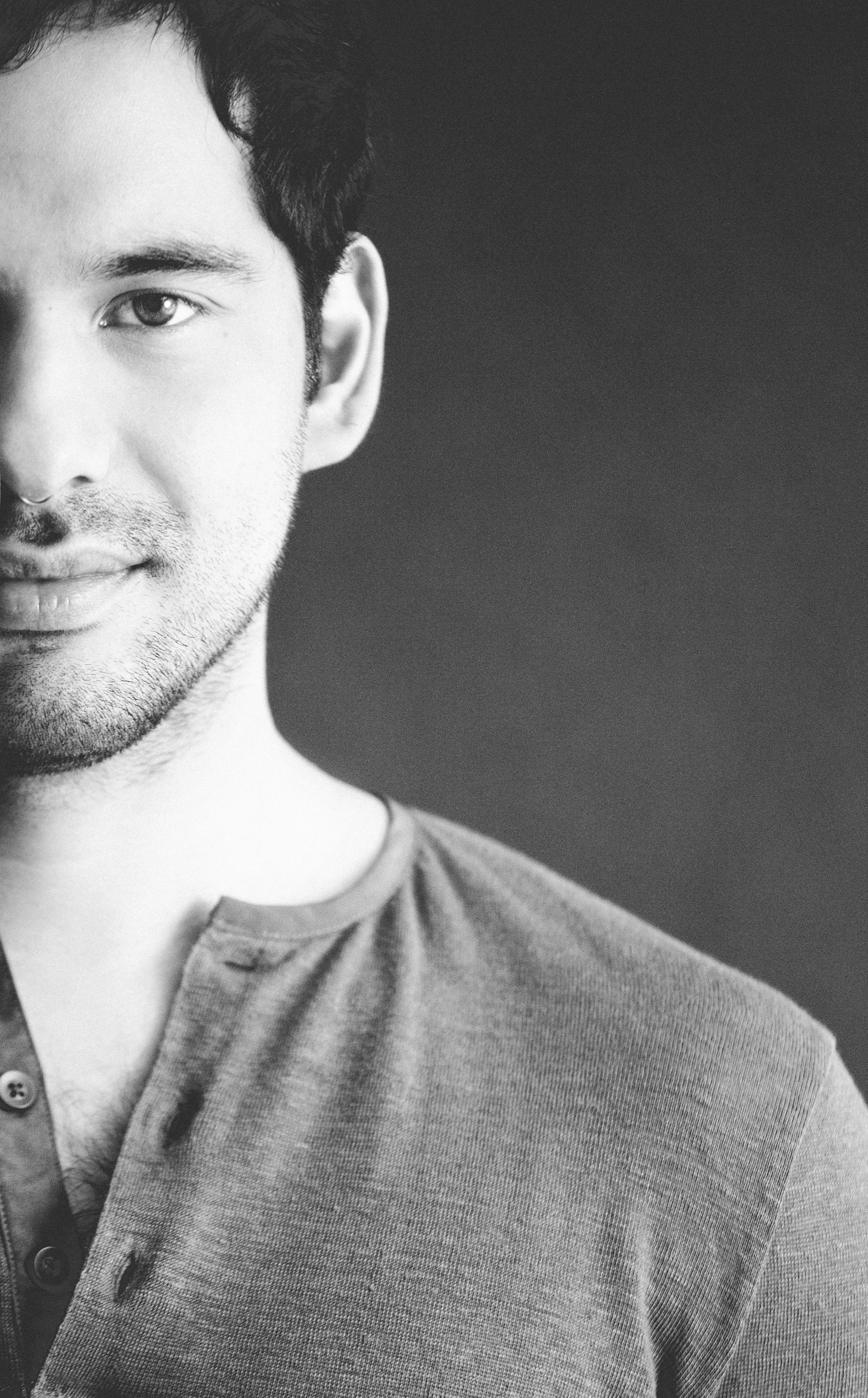
- Huerta Marin in 2017
- Born: Hugo Huerta Marin; 1986 (age 38–39); Mexico City, Mexico
- Occupations: Artist; graphic designer
- Years active: 2012–present

Hugo Huerta Marin (born 1986, Mexico City) is a multi disciplinary artist and graphic designer based in New York City, whose work centers on subjects of gender and cultural identity.

== Background ==
Born in Mexico City, Huerta Marin moved to New York City in 2012, and has since worked for cultural institutions in the US and Mexico, including the Solomon R. Guggenheim museum. In 2014, he joined the studio of the Serbian artist Marina Abramović as graphic designer and art director. Together they have collaborated internationally for venues such as, The Royal Danish Library, Copenhagen; Sesc Pompeia, Sao Paulo; Moderna Museet, Stockholm; CAC Malaga, Malaga; The Art of Elysium, Los Angeles; Royal Academy of Arts, London; Foundation Beyeler, Basel; Henie Onstage Kunstsenter, Oslo, Kunsthalle Tübingen, Tübingen; Modern Art Oxford, Oxford and other public, private and independent spaces around the world. Huerta Marin’s solo exhibitions have been featured in New York City, Montreal, Mexico City and Tokyo.

== Portrait of an Artist ==
Portrait of an Artist is the name of an art installation and an artist book compiled and written by artist Hugo Huerta Marin. The launch was held at Fotografiska in New York City on October 28, 2021 and published by Prestel Publishing. Huerta Marin photographed and created a dialogue with twenty five female artists: Marina Abramovic, Cate Blanchett, Annie Lennox, Miuccia Prada, Anjelica Huston, Carrie Mae Weems, Diane von Fürstenberg, Yoko Ono, Tracey Emin, Catherine Deneuve, Shirin Neshat, Ann Demeulemeester, Tania Bruguera, Rei Kawakubo, Orlan, Julianne Moore, Inez van Lamsweerde, Charlotte Gainsbourg, FKA twigs, Uma Thurman, Isabelle Huppert, Jenny Holzer, Debbie Harry and Agnès Varda to explore the subjects of art, gender and studio-practice.

== Exhibitions ==
- The Hole Gallery, New York City, US, 2017.
- Never Apart Gallery, Montreal, Canada, 2017.
- Muac Unam, Mexico City, Mexico, 2020. Pop up exhibition and public talk with the artist Shirin Neshat.
- Casa Wabi, Mexico City, 2021
- Fotografiska, New York City, US, 2021. Pop up exhibition and public talk with the artist Marina Abramovic.

== Residencies ==
- Resident at Casa Wabi, Tokyo, Japan 2019
- Resident at Casa Wabi, Oaxaca, Mexico 2021
