= The Devil in the Dark =

- Star Trek: The Original Series episode
- Kirk faces the Horta alone
- Episode no.: Season 1 Episode 25
- Directed by: Joseph Pevney
- Written by: Gene L. Coon
- Cinematography by: Jerry Finnerman
- Production code: 026
- Original air date: March 9, 1967

Guest appearances
- Ken Lynch – Chief Engineer Vanderberg; Janos Prohaska – Horta; Barry Russo – Security Chief Giotto; Brad Weston – Appel; Biff Elliot – Schmitter; George E. Allen – Engineer #1; Robert Hoy – Sam; Eddie Paskey – Lt. Leslie; Frank da Vinci – Ensign Vinci; John Cavett – Guard; Ron Veto – Security Guard; Bill Blackburn – Lt. Hadley

Episode chronology
| ← Previous "This Side of Paradise" | Next → "Errand of Mercy" |
- Star Trek: The Original Series season 1

"The Devil in the Dark" is the twenty-fifth episode of the first season of the American science fiction television series Star Trek. Written by Gene L. Coon and directed by Joseph Pevney, the episode first aired on March 9, 1967.

In the episode, the Enterprise is called to investigate deaths at a planetary mining facility. Spock and Kirk go on a mission to the facility, leading to them facing off against a deadly subterranean creature.

This episode marks the first appearance of Doctor McCoy's catchphrase, "I'm a doctor, not a ..."

== Plot ==
The USS Enterprise arrives at the pergium mining colony on planet Janus VI to help the colony deal with an unknown creature that has killed 50 miners and engineers, and destroyed equipment with a strong corrosive substance. Captain Kirk, Spock, and McCoy meet with the mine supervisor, Chief Engineer Vanderberg. During the briefing, Spock's attention is drawn to a silicon nodule on Vanderberg's desk, which Vanderberg dismisses as a geological oddity. They are alerted to a problem in the colony's nuclear reactor, and find its guard killed and the main circulating pump stolen. The part has long since gone out of production, so no replacements are available. Chief Engineer Scott jury rigs a substitute, but it fails shortly thereafter, necessitating the missing part be found and reinstalled before the reactor goes super-critical in 10 hours or is manually shut down, which will suffocate the miners.

Kirk and his security team search for the creature. Spock, suspecting it may be a silicon based lifeform, modifies their phasers to be more effective against silicon. They encounter the creature—which has the appearance of molten rock—and fire upon it, breaking a piece of it off. The creature flees by burrowing through a rock wall. Spock analyzes the fragment, whose composition resembles fibrous asbestos. He deduces that it burrows through solid rock by secreting the same corrosive substance that has killed the miners. Spock adjusts his tricorder to scan for silicon-based life, and confirms that the creature is the only such lifeform for miles.

Kirk and Spock happen upon a chamber containing thousands of the silicon nodules. The creature causes a cave-in that separates Kirk from Spock. Though Spock urges Kirk to kill it, Kirk observes the creature backs off whenever he aims his phaser at it. Spock finds a way around the cave-in and joins Kirk. He attempts a mind meld with the creature, but perceives little but intense pain. The creature, having gained some knowledge of human language from the meld, etches the ambiguous message "NO KILL I" into a rock. By making physical contact with the creature, Spock establishes a deeper mind meld. He learns that the creature is called a Horta, and that its species dies out completely every 50,000 years, save for one individual that remains alive to protect the eggs, which are the silicon nodules. As the nodule eggs hatch, the single adult Horta acts as a protective mother to this next generation. Though nearing death because of her wound, the Horta communicates through Spock, telling them the location of the stolen pump. There Kirk also discovers thousands of broken eggs which were destroyed by the miners as worthless.

The miners arrive and attempt to attack the creature. Kirk and Spock stop them, explaining that it was only protecting its eggs when it killed humans. Dr. McCoy successfully treats the Horta's wound using a silicon-based cement normally used for building emergency shelters. The miners fear the prospect of thousands of Horta, but Kirk convinces them that the Horta are peaceful and could collaborate with the miners by tunneling for them.

Kirk, Spock, and McCoy return to the Enterprise, prepare to leave orbit, and learn from Vanderberg that the eggs have hatched. Already, the new Horta have uncovered rich veins of pergium and other valuable metals.

== Production ==
The Horta was played by stuntman and acrobat Janos Prohaska, who also designed the costume. Prohaska was promised that if he created something good enough, the producers would rent the costume and pay Prohaska to play the part. Episode writer Gene Coon was convinced of the costume's effectiveness after an impromptu demonstration by Prohaska in the studios.

William Shatner's father died during the filming of the episode, but Shatner insisted on going through with production. He felt closer to the cast and crew for helping him through the difficult time.

This episode also marks the first appearance of Doctor McCoy's catchphrase, "I'm a doctor, not a ...!" In this case, the line is, "I'm a doctor, not a bricklayer!", said by McCoy when Kirk orders him to heal the Horta.

The name Horta came from a well-liked sound effects and music editor at the time named Sam Horta (1906–1999). Sam later opened a sound editing facility in Burbank called "Horta Editorial". His daughter Eileen continued in his footsteps and served as the president of the Motion Picture Sound Editors, M.P.S.E.

== Reception ==
=== Cast ===
William Shatner wrote in his memoirs that "The Devil in the Dark" was his favorite original Star Trek episode. He thought it was "exciting, thought-provoking and intelligent, it contained all of the ingredients that made up our very best Star Treks". In the documentary 50 Years of Star Trek, Leonard Nimoy also named "The Devil in the Dark" as an "interesting episode", stating "I thought [it] was a wonderful episode about the fear of the unknown, how we fear and even hate something that we don't know anything about, learn who your enemy is, and it's not, maybe then it's no longer your enemy."

=== Critics ===
In 2009, Zack Handlen of The A.V. Club gave the episode an 'A' rating, describing it as a classic. Handlen praised the acting for Kirk, Spock, and McCoy, writing that they elevated what could be a silly scenario (Spock mind-melding with a rock monster) into gripping drama. Handlen later included the episode as one of ten "must see" episodes of the original series.

A 2015 retrospective by Keith R. A. DeCandido for Reactor magazine was effusive in its praise, calling it iconic and "one of the greatest episodes" of Star Trek. He praised it for inverting the expectations on a deadly monster scenario well with the revelation the 'monster' was just a mother protecting her young, and that the problem could be solved without further violence. He noted that while a twist revealing that the seeming monster wasn't so bad became more commonplace in later media, "The Devil in the Dark" was quite unexpected for its time. He also liked how the episode, as well as other first-season episodes such as "Charlie X" and "Arena", show the benefits of the Enterprise crew attempting to treat honorably and compassionately even with its foes.

A variety of lists have mentioned the episode as one of the standouts of Star Trek. In 2012, the Christian Science Monitor ranked it the eighth best episode of the original Star Trek. In 2016, Empire ranked it 2nd in the top 50 episodes of all Star Trek. In 2017, Business Insider ranked "The Devil in the Dark" the 4th best episode of the original series. Silas Lesnick of Collider ranked this episode in 2018 as the 10th best original series episode. PopMatters ranked it the number one best episode of the original series.

The episode has appeared on other lists as well. In 2015, New York Public Library rated this episode as having Spock's fourth best scene in the show. Vox put it on a list of 25 episodes that provided a good overview of the Star Trek franchise for newcomers.

== See also ==
- "Home Soil", a first-season episode of Star Trek: The Next Generation, where a naturally occurring crystalline lifeform is encountered
- HORTA, a tunneling device used in the mining industry, its name a backronym reference to the Horta of Star Trek
- Island of Terror, a British horror film released in 1966, also features a silicon-based life form with unusual corrosive properties.
