= HORTA (mining) =

HORTA is an underground geographic positioning technology utilized in the mining industry and being considered for extraterrestrial space mining applications. The technology utilizes a gyroscope and an accelerometer, together called an inertial navigation system or INS, to aid in 3D-position determination.

It was developed by Canadian mining company Inco in the late 1990s, based on an earlier technology that had been originally developed for the United States Armed Forces. It provides an automated solution to the problem of positioning and location in underground mines.

The term is a backronym for the Horta, an alien species seen in the Star Trek episode "The Devil in the Dark"; the aliens were excellent miners. As Inco uses the term, HORTA stands for Honeywell Ore Retrieval and Tunneling Aid.

A mining vehicle, "with a HORTA mounted, can survey much faster and more accurately than manual surveys. It takes the truck 120 minutes to survey a 1.6-km-long drift, recording 1,500 points every 60 cm. This compares with a manual survey of the same distance that takes 180 hours, and records only five points every 6 m. Added benefits from such a detailed survey would be to allow engineers to design more effective ventilation systems, or to regularly check ground stability."

HORTA units may be fitted onto all mobile underground equipment, including drills, so their position may be determined with acceptable engineering accuracy.

== See also ==
- Cave survey
- Teleoperation
