= 1993 Concertación presidential primary =

Chilean political primary

Concertación presidential primary, 1993
- May 23, 1993
- Registered: 608 569
- Turnout: 63.76
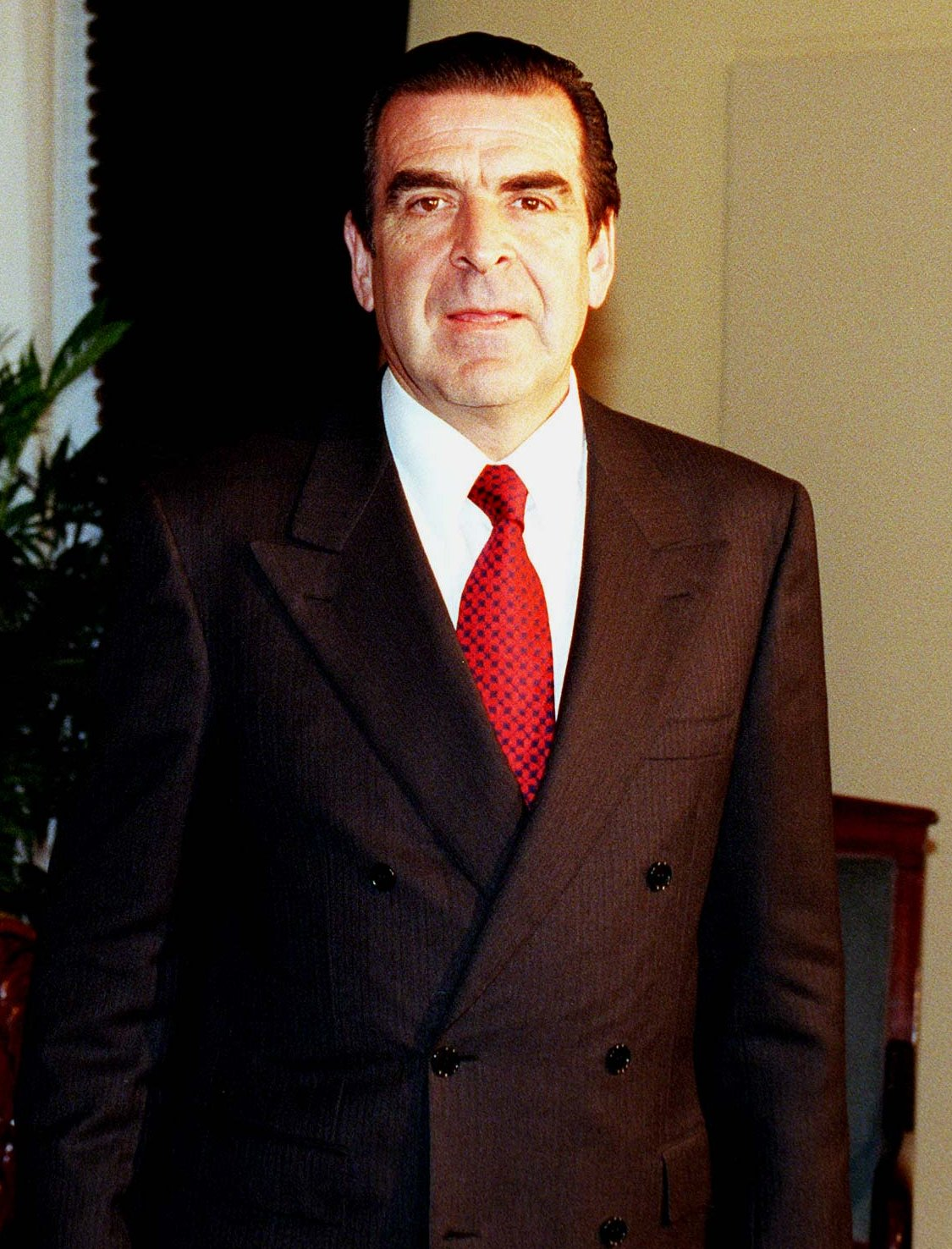

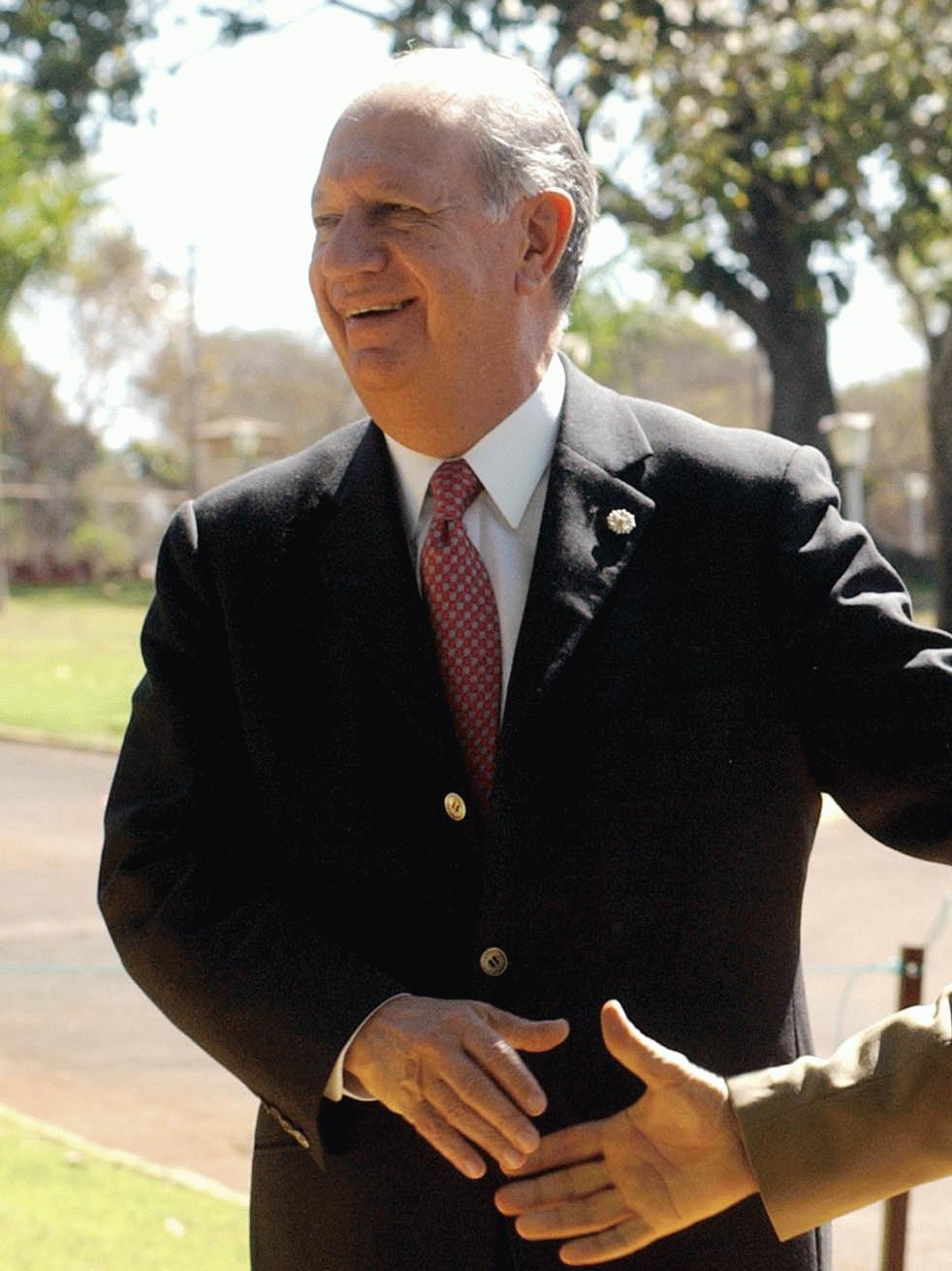
Candidate	Eduardo Frei Ruiz-Tagle	Ricardo Lagos Escobar
Party	PDC	For Democracy
Popular vote	244.256	141.477
Percentage	63.32%	36.68%
Previous Presidential Candidate
Patricio Aylwin
PDC
Presidential Candidate
Eduardo Frei Ruiz-Tagle
PDC

The 1993 presidential primaries of the Concertación de Partidos por la Democracia were held to select the coalition's candidate for the 1993 Chilean presidential election. Eduardo Frei Ruiz-Tagle, son of former president Eduardo Frei Montalva and candidate of the Christian Democratic Party (PDC), faced Ricardo Lagos Escobar, representing the Socialist Party (PS), the Party for Democracy (PPD), the Radical Party (PR), and the Chilean Social Democracy Party.

After the primary on May 23, a convention on May 30 confirmed Frei Ruiz-Tagle as the coalition's candidate. In the December 1993 election, he won the presidency with 57.98% of the vote, one of the highest margins in Chilean history.

== Definition of candidacies ==
Towards the end of 1992, pre-candidates began to emerge within the Concertación for the 1993 presidential election. The government encouraged the coalition parties to agree on a common candidate, following the strong results achieved in the 1992 municipal elections.

For the Christian Democratic Party, civil engineer Eduardo Frei Ruiz-Tagle, son of former President Eduardo Frei Montalva, was proposed. Although he entered politics in 1986, he had been elected as a senator for Santiago Oriente in 1989 and was serving as president of the PDC. Frei Ruiz-Tagle quickly prevailed over other potential candidates, such as Gabriel Valdés and Andrés Zaldívar, and was officially proclaimed on December 13, 1992.

Meanwhile, in the leftist sector of the Concertación (led by the Socialist (PS) and Party for Democracy (PPD)), Ricardo Lagos, a lawyer and economist, resigned from the Ministry of Education on September 28, 1992, to run as a pre-candidate.

The Radical Party (PR) initially proclaimed Senator Anselmo Sule as its presidential candidate on August 15, 1992; however, he later withdrew in favor of Lagos.

== Campaign and election ==
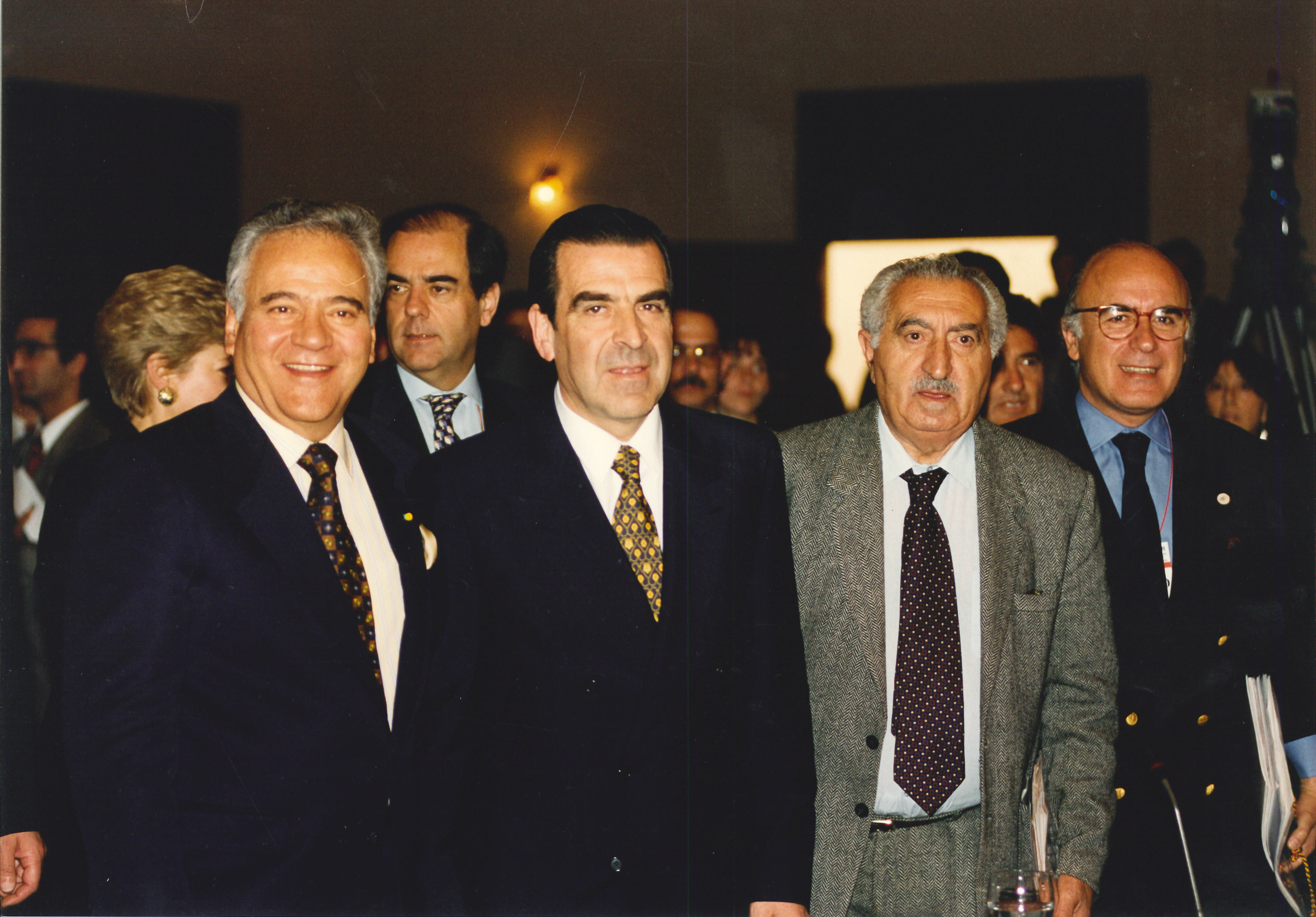
Eduardo Frei Ruiz-Tagle and other Concertación members in 1993

The Concertación formed a commission of politicians—Genaro Arriagada (PDC), Erich Schnake (PPD), Benjamín Teplizky (PR), and Hernán Vodanovic (PS)—to study methods for selecting its presidential candidate. Known as the "Teplizky Commission," it presented eight possible procedures to the coalition parties on 8 January 1993. The chosen method combined primary elections for registered party militants and adherents with a convention of 3,000 delegates, 60% elected based on primary results and 40% appointed by the Frei and Lagos campaigns according to the 1992 municipal election results.

On May 20, Lagos and Frei participated in the only televised debate of the election, moderated by journalist Sergio Campos, which achieved a 20-point rating.

The primaries took place on Sunday, May 23, 1993, with Eduardo Frei winning 64% of the vote. Frei's decisive victory led Lagos to quickly concede, clearing the way for the definition of the Concertación candidacies for the parliamentary elections.

The Concertación convention was held at the Diego Portales Building in Santiago on May 30. Of the total delegates, 1,924 supported Frei and 1,076 supported Lagos, officially proclaiming Frei as the coalition's presidential candidate.

== Results ==
Candidate	Party	Endorsement	Votes	%
Eduardo Frei Ruiz-Tagle	PDC		244 256	63,32
Ricardo Lagos Escobar	PPD/PS	PPD-PS-PR-SDCH	141 477	36,68
Valid votes			385 733	99,41 %
Void and blank			2285	0,59 %
Total			388 018	100,00 %
Inscrits			608 569	63,76 %

=== By region ===
Región	Adherents				Militants			
Región	Lagos		Frei		Lagos		Frei	
Región	Votes	%	Votes	%	Votes	%	Votes	%
Tarapacá	3260	44,79 %	4019	55,21 %	984	45,70 %	1169	54,30 %
Antofagasta	4583	45,62 %	5464	54,38 %	1079	40,16 %	1608	59,84 %
Atacama	1996	43,16 %	2629	56,84 %	629	53,26 %	552	46,74 %
Coquimbo	5025	39,67 %	7642	60,33 %	1772	45,30 %	2140	54,70 %
Valparaíso	12 331	33,69 %	24 269	66,31 %	3886	30,86 %	8707	69,14 %
Metropolitana	41 011	39,35 %	63 201	60,65 %	15 089	42,24 %	20 630	57,76 %
O'Higgins	4162	30,68 %	9403	69,32 %	1680	33,75 %	3298	66,25 %
Maule	6064	30,48 %	13 829	69,52 %	2239	34,28 %	4292	65,72 %
Biobío	11 273	31,80 %	24 173	68,20 %	3011	38,58 %	4794	61,42 %
Araucanía	4036	23,77 %	12 941	76,23 %	1583	32,49 %	3289	67,51 %
Los Lagos	7237	32,48 %	15 044	67,52 %	3160	41,22 %	4506	58,78 %
Aysén	791	37,88 %	1297	62,12 %	363	41,77 %	506	58,23 %
Magallanes	3256	45,74 %	3862	54,26 %	977	49,62 %	992	50,38 %
Total	105 025	35,87 %	187 773	64,13 %	36 452	39,22 %	56 483	60,78 %

== Convention results ==

Candidate	Party	Primary			Command	Total
Candidate	Party	Militants	Adherents	Total	Command	Total
Eduardo Frei; Ruiz-Tagle	PDC	547	577	1124	800	64,2
Ricardo Lagos Escobar	PPD/PS	353	323	676	400	35,8
Total				1800	1200	3000
