= Horta (mythology) =

Etruscan goddess of agriculture

Horta is a minor Etruscan goddess of agriculture, horticulture, or placename. This is based on a conjecture that the personal name Hurtate- is based on a root name *Hurta and on a chance similarity with the Latin word hortus "garden".
